= Neighborhoods of Wichita, Kansas =

The following is a list of neighborhoods in Wichita, Kansas, United States.

- A Price Woodard
- Aberdeen
- Auburn Hills
- Benjamin Hills
- Bradford
- Brookhollow
- Calfskin Group
- Chadsworth
- College Hill
- Cottonwood Village
- Country Overlook
- Courtland
- Crestview Heights
- Crown Heights North
- Crown Heights South
- Delano
- Delano Township
- Downtown
- East Front
- East Mt. Vernon
- Eastridge
- El Pueblo
- The Elm
- Evergreen
- Fabrique
- Fairfax
- Fairmount
- Forest Hills
- Forest Lakes
- Fossil Rim
- Fox Ridge
- Grandview Heights
- Hilltop
- The Hyde
- Indian Hills
- Indian Hills Riverbend
- Ken-Mar
- La Placita Park
- The Lakes at Aberdeen
- Lambsdale
- Linwood
- Longview
- MacDonald
- Maple Hills
- Matlock Heights
- McAdams
- McCormick
- Mead
- Meadowlark
- Midtown
- Murdock
- New Salem
- North Riverside
- Northeast Central
- Northeast Heights
- Northeast K-96
- Northeast Millair
- Northridge Lakes
- Northwest Big River
- Oakview
- Orchard Breeze
- Orchard Park
- Park Meadows
- Planeview United
- Pleasant Valley
- Power
- Reflection Ridge
- Riverside
- Riverview
- Rockhurst
- Schweiter
- Schweiter East
- Sherwood Glen
- Sleepy Hollow
- South Area
- South Central
- South City
- South Seneca United
- Southwest
- Southwest Village
- Stanley/Aley
- Sterling Farms
- Sunflower
- Sunnybrook One
- Sunnyside
- Uptown
- Vicksburg
- Village
- Westlink

== See also ==
Cities

- Eastborough, Kansas - separate city and enclave of Wichita. It is located in east Wichita.

Census-designated places

- McConnell AFB - It is located in southeast Wichita metro.
- Oaklawn-Sunview - It is located in southeast Wichita metro.
