= KCTU =

KCTU may refer to:

- Korean Confederation of Trade Unions, a national trade union centre in South Korea
- KCTU-LD, a low-power television station (channel 23, virtual channel 5) licensed to Wichita, Kansas, United States
