= Indian Hills Riverbend, Wichita, Kansas =

Indian Hills Riverbend
- Neighborhood
- Interactive map of Indian Hills Riverbend
- Coordinates: 37°42′49″N 97°22′14″W
- Country: United States
- State: Kansas
- County: Sedgwick
- City: Wichita
- Elevation: 1,312 ft (400 m)

Population (2016)
  - Total: 2,408
- ZIP code: 67203
- Area code: 316

Indian Hills Riverbend is a neighborhood in Wichita, Kansas, United States. A predominantly residential area, it lies on the west bank of the Arkansas River in the northwestern part of the city.

== Geography ==
Indian Hills Riverbend is located at 37°42′49″N 97°22′14″W (37.713611, -97.370556) at an elevation of 1,312 ft (400 m). It consists of the area between the Arkansas River to the north and east, 13th Street to the south, and Sheridan Street to the west. The Benjamin Hills neighborhood lies across the river to the north, North Riverside lies across the river to the east, Riverside lies across the river to the southeast, Indian Hills lies to the south, La Placita Park lies to the southwest, and Northwest Big River lies to the west.

== Government ==
For the purposes of representation on the Wichita City Council, Indian Hills Riverbend is in Council District 6.

For the purposes of representation in the Kansas Legislature, the neighborhood is in the 25th district of the Kansas Senate and the 92nd district of the Kansas House of Representatives.

== Education ==
Wichita Public Schools operates one facility in the neighborhood: Gateway Alternative Program Center.

== Transportation ==
13th Street is the primary road in Indian Hills Riverbend, running east-west along the south side of the neighborhood. McLean Boulevard runs north-south through the eastern part of the neighborhood.

Wichita Transit offers bus service in Indian Hills Riverbend on its 15 route.
