= North Riverside, Wichita, Kansas =

North Riverside
- Neighborhood
- Interactive map of North Riverside
- Coordinates: 37°42′53″N 97°21′16″W
- Country: United States
- State: Kansas
- County: Sedgwick
- City: Wichita
- Elevation: 1,309 ft (399 m)

Population (2016)
  - Total: 4,199
- ZIP code: 67203
- Area code: 316

North Riverside is a residential neighborhood in Wichita, Kansas, United States. It lies in the north-central part of the city between the Arkansas and Little Arkansas Rivers.

== Geography ==
North Riverside is located at 37°42′53″N 97°21′16″W (37.714722, -97.354444) at an elevation of 1,309 ft (399 m). It consists of the area between the Arkansas River and Amidon Avenue in the west and the Little Arkansas River in the east and between 21st Street in the north and 13th Street in the south. North Riverside borders the neighborhoods of El Pueblo to the north, Midtown to the east, Riverside to the south, Indian Hills to the southwest, Indian Hills Riverbend to the west, and Benjamin Hills to the northwest.

== Government ==
For the purposes of representation on the Wichita City Council, North Riverside is in Council District 6.

For the purposes of representation in the Kansas Legislature, North Riverside is in the 25th district of the Kansas Senate and the 92nd district of the Kansas House of Representatives.

== Education ==
Wichita Public Schools operates two facilities in North Riverside:

- Marshall Middle School
- Woodland Health/Wellness Magnet Elementary School

== Parks and recreation ==
The city’s Department of Park and Recreation maintains two parks in North Riverside: Minisa Park and South Woodland Park. Minisa Park spans 9.6 acres (3.9 ha) on West 13th Street and hosts a basketball court, a community facility, a playground, and a swimming pool. Formerly known as the Wichita Municipal Tourist Camp, it was renamed Minisa in 1938 after a Chippewa word meaning “red water at sunset.” 7-acre (2.8 ha) South Woodland Park lies on North Heiserman Street on the west bank of the Little Arkansas River and includes a playground.

== Transportation ==
13th Street is the primary street in North Riverside, running along the southern side of the neighborhood. Other arterial roads include Amidon Avenue, which runs north-south along the west side of the neighborhood north of the Arkansas River, and 21st Street, which runs east-west along the north side of the neighborhood.

Wichita Transit offers bus service to North Riverside on its 15 and 17 routes.
