= Indian Hills, Wichita, Kansas =

Indian Hills
- Neighborhood
- Interactive map of Indian Hills
- Coordinates: 37°42′10″N 97°22′33″W
- Country: United States
- State: Kansas
- County: Sedgwick
- City: Wichita
- Elevation: 1,306 ft (398 m)

Population (2016)
  - Total: 1,881
- ZIP code: 67203
- Area code: 316

Indian Hills is a neighborhood in Wichita, Kansas, United States. A mixed commercial and residential area, it lies on the west bank of the Arkansas River in the west-central part of the city.

== Geography ==
Indian Hills is located at 37°42′10″N 97°22′33″W (37.702778, -97.375833) at an elevation of 1,306 ft (398 m). It consists of the area between 13th Street to the north, the Arkansas River to the east, Central Avenue to the south, and Sheridan Street to the west. The Indian Hills Riverbend neighborhood lies to the north, North Riverside lies across the river to the northeast, Riverside lies across the river to the east, Delano lies to the southeast, Sunflower lies the south, La Placita Park lies to the west, and Northwest Big River lies to the northwest.

== Government ==
For the purposes of representation on the Wichita City Council, Indian Hills is in Council District 6.

For the purposes of representation in the Kansas Legislature, Indian Hills is in the 25th district of the Kansas Senate and the 92nd and 95th districts of the Kansas House of Representatives.

== Parks and recreation ==
The city's Department of Park and Recreation maintains the Indian Hills Greenway, a 3.2-acre (1.3 ha) section of land along the west bank of the Arkansas River. A segment of the 10-mile (16 km) Arkansas River Bicycle Path runs through the Greenway.

== Transportation ==
McLean Boulevard is the main road through Indian Hills. It runs windingly north-south parallel to the west bank of the Arkansas River. The other arterial roads in the neighborhood are 13th Street, which runs east-west along the north side, and Central Avenue, which runs east-west along the south side.

Wichita Transit offers bus service to Indian Hills on its 12 and 15 routes.
