= Westlink, Wichita, Kansas =

Westlink
- Neighborhood
- Interactive map of Westlink
- Coordinates: 37°41′47″N 97°27′21″W
- Country: United States
- State: Kansas
- County: Sedgwick
- City: Wichita
- Elevation: 1,336 ft (407 m)

Population (2016)
  - Total: 6,317
- ZIP code: 67209, 67212
- Area code: 316

Westlink is a neighborhood in Wichita, Kansas, United States. A mixed commercial and residential area, it lies in the western part of the city.

== Geography ==
Westlink is located at 37°41′47″N 97°27′21″W (37.696389, - 97.455833) at an elevation of 1,336 ft (407 m). It consists of the area between 13th Street in the north, Tyler Road in the east, Maple Street in the south, and Maize Road in the west. The Amarado Estates and Northwest Village West neighborhoods lie to the north, Northwest Village lies to the northeast, Country Acres II and Country Acres lie to the east, Woodchuck lies to the southeast, Callahan and Dell lie to the south, Cambridge-Lexington lies to the southwest, West and Arlington Place lie to the west, and North Lark Lane lies to the northwest.

Cowskin Creek, a tributary of the Arkansas River, flows southeast through the southwestern part of Westlink. A small tributary of the Cowskin flows windingly south through the neighborhood, joining the creek at Maple Street.

== Economy ==
Built in 1958, Westlink Shopping Center is a large strip mall located on the southwest corner of Central and Tyler Road.

== Government ==
For the purposes of representation on the Wichita City Council, Westlink is in Council District 5.

For the purposes of representation in the Kansas Legislature, the neighborhood is in the 27th district of the Kansas Senate and the 100th district of the Kansas House of Representatives.

== Education ==
Wichita Public Schools operates two schools in the neighborhood:

- McCollom Elementary School
- Peterson Elementary School

In addition, the campus of Wichita Northwest High School is located immediately east of Westlink on the southeast corner of 13th Street and Tyler Road.

== Parks and recreation ==
The city’s Department of Park and Recreation maintains three parks in the neighborhood. Buffalo Park spans 38.17 acres (15.45 ha) at the corner of Hardtner Avenue and Maize Road, and it includes a baseball diamond, basketball court, children’s playground, two softball diamonds, tennis courts, and a water playground. Harvest Park is a 9.34-acre (3.78 ha) neighborhood park at Provincial Lane and North Westlink Avenue with a basketball court, swimming pool, and tennis courts. Westlink Park is a small, 3.5-acre (1.4 ha) park at North Caddy Lane and West Delano Street. It includes a children’s playground and a fitness trail.

Opened in 1928, Rolling Hills Country Club is a private, 18-hole golf course located on the banks of Cowskin Creek in the southwestern part of the neighborhood.

== Transportation ==
Central Avenue, which runs east-west, is the primary route through Westlink. Other arterial roads in the neighborhood are those that form its perimeter: 13th Street, which runs east-west, along the north side; Tyler Road, which runs north-south, along the east side; Maple Street, which runs east-west along the south side; Maize Road, which runs north-south, along the west side.

Wichita Transit offers bus service in Westlink on its 12 route.
