= Northwest Big River, Wichita, Kansas =

Northwest Big River
- Neighborhood
- Interactive map of Northwest Big River
- Coordinates: 37°43′05″N 97°23′12″W
- Country: United States
- State: Kansas
- County: Sedgwick
- City: Wichita
- Elevation: 1,321 ft (403 m)

Population (2016)
  - Total: 2,042
- ZIP code: 67203
- Area code: 316

Northwest Big River is a neighborhood in Wichita, Kansas, United States. A mixed commercial and residential area, it lies on the south bank of the Arkansas River in the northwestern part of the city.

== Geography ==
Northwest Big River is located at 37°43′05″N 97°23′12″W (37.718056, -97.386667) at an elevation of 1,321 ft (403 m). It consists of the area between 21st Street to the north, the Arkansas River to the northeast, Sheridan Street to the east, 13th Street to the south, West Street to the west, and Interstate 235 to the northwest. The Benjamin Hills neighborhood lies across the river to the north, Indian Hills Riverbend lies to the east, Indian Hills lies to the southeast, La Placita Park lies to the south, and Orchard Park lies to the southwest.

== Government ==
For the purposes of representation on the Wichita City Council, Northwest Big River is in Council District 6.

For the purposes of representation in the Kansas Legislature, the neighborhood is in the 25th district of the Kansas Senate and the 92nd and 105th districts of the Kansas House of Representatives.

== Education ==
Wichita Public Schools operates one school immediately west of the neighborhood: O. K. Elementary School.

== Media ==
KAKE, the ABC television affiliate in Wichita, broadcasts from studios on North West Street in Northwest Big River.

== Parks and recreation ==
Big Arkansas River Park is a 2.08-acre (0.84 ha) space on the south bank of the Arkansas River immediately north of 21st Street. The 10-mile (16 km) Arkansas River Bicycle Path ends in the park. Sycamore Park spans 12.89 acres (5.22 ha) on West 15th Street and includes a basketball court, children’s playground, softball diamond, and tennis courts. Both parks are maintained by the city’s Department of Park and Recreation.

== Transportation ==
13th Street and West Street are the arterial roads in the neighborhood. 13th Street runs east-west along its south side; West Street runs north-south along its west side. In addition, 21st Street runs east-west along the neighborhood’s north side.

Wichita Transit offers bus service to Northwest Big River on its 15 route.
