= El Pueblo, Wichita, Kansas =

El Pueblo
- Neighborhood
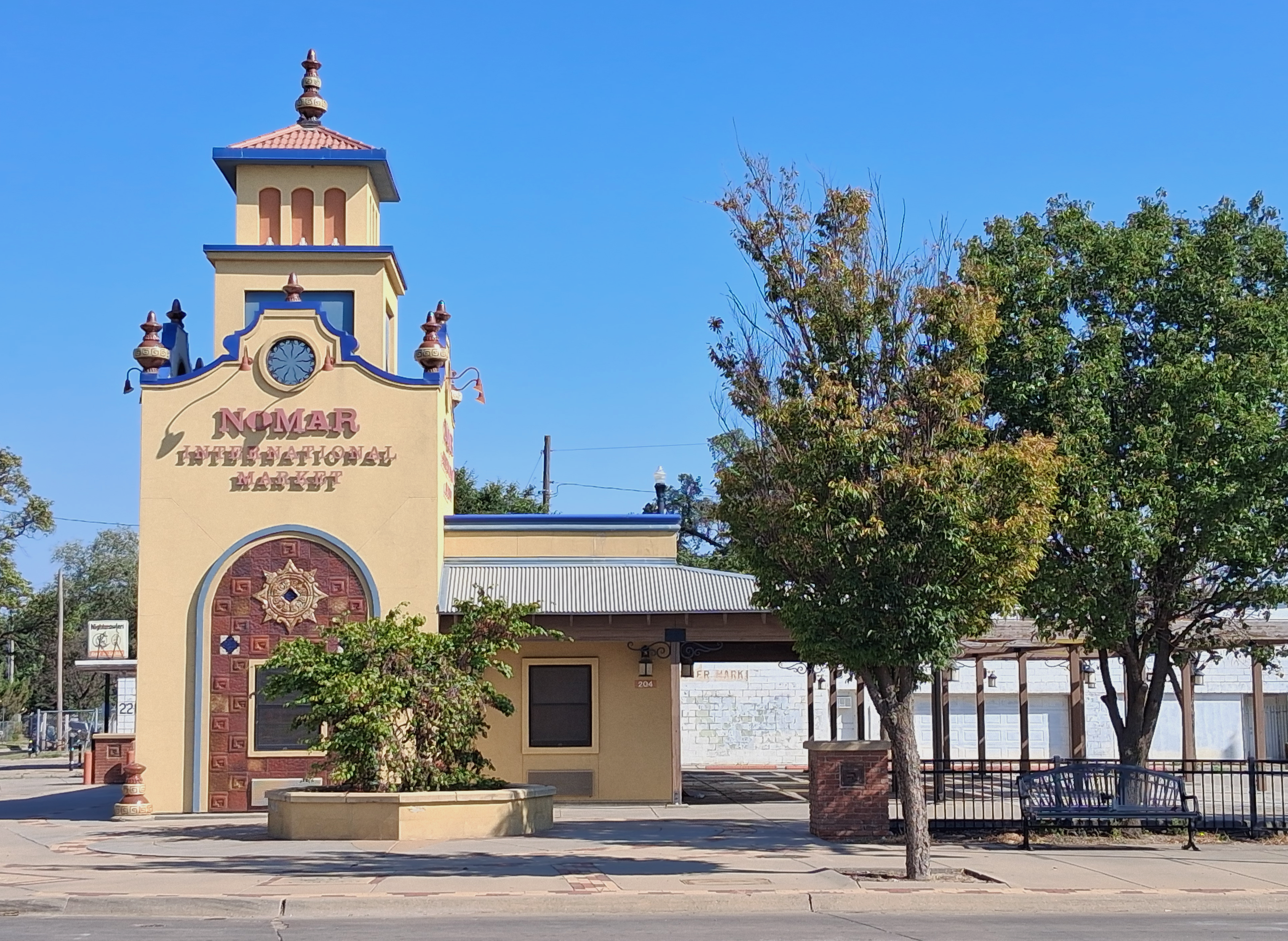
- Nomar International Market, an example of the architectural style in El Pueblo's commercial area (2026)
- Interactive map of El Pueblo
- Coordinates: 37°43′51″N 97°20′56″W
- Country: United States
- State: Kansas
- County: Sedgwick
- City: Wichita
- Elevation: 1,314 ft (401 m)

Population (2016)
  - Total: 6,924
- ZIP code: 67203, 67204, 67219
- Area code: 316

El Pueblo is a neighborhood in Wichita, Kansas, United States. A mixed commercial and residential area on the east bank of the Little Arkansas River, it is the cultural and historical center of the city's Hispanic community.

== History ==
In the 1910s and 1920s, railroad workers recruited from Mexico settled the area along north Broadway Street called "the North End". The area became Wichita's first barrio and the seat of the local Mexican American community. The portion east of Broadway became known as El Huarache; the area west of Broadway and north of 21st Street became El Pueblo. In the following decades, immigrants from Mexico and other parts of Latin America continued to settle in the neighborhood, bolstering and broadening its Hispanic character.

In recent years, community organizations have formed to both preserve the neighborhood's heritage and encourage economic development. The area has become well-known locally for its Latin American restaurants and marketplace.

== Geography ==
El Pueblo is located at 37°43′51″N 97°20′56″W (37.73083, -97.34889) at an elevation of 1,314 feet (401 m). It consists of the area between 29th Street to the north, 21st Street to the south, the Little Arkansas River to the west, and Broadway Street to the east. It borders the BNSF/Union Pacific rail corridor to the east, the Midtown and North Riverside neighborhoods to the south, Benjamin Hills across the river to the west, and Jones Park to the north. Chisholm Creek, a tributary of the Arkansas River flows southeast through the eastern portion of the neighborhood.

== Government ==
For the purposes of representation on the Wichita City Council, El Pueblo lies within Council District 6.

For the purposes of representation in the Kansas Legislature, El Pueblo is located in the 29th district of the Kansas Senate and the 103rd district of the Kansas House of Representatives.

== Education ==
Wichita Public Schools operates one school in El Pueblo: Cloud Elementary School.

The Evergreen Branch of the Wichita Public Library, the second largest branch library in the city, is in El Pueblo at the corner of North Arkansas and West 25th Street.

== Media ==
KPTS, the PBS member station in Wichita, broadcasts from studios located on 21st Street in El Pueblo.

== Parks and recreation ==
The city government's Park and Recreation department manages three parks in El Pueblo: Evergreen Park, Pat Garcia Veterans Memorial Park, and Schell Park. Located at the intersection of North Arkansas and West 27th Street, Evergreen Park spans 27.28 acres (11.04 ha) and includes a basketball court, children's playgrounds, a football field, a swimming pool, tennis courts, and a recreation center. 1.59-acre (0.64 ha) Pat Garcia Veteran Memorial Park, created to honor war veteran Pat Garcia, lies on the west bank of Chisholm Creek at East 25th Street and North Wellington Place. Schell Park, named for former park commissioner W.F. Schell, occupies 8 acres (3.2 ha) on West 25th Street and includes a children's playground and a soccer field.

== Culture ==
=== Events ===
The community in El Pueblo holds multiple events throughout the year to commemorate Hispanic holidays, including Cesar Chavez Day, Cinco de Mayo, and Puerto Rican Day.

=== Points of interest ===
- Nomar International Market

== Transportation ==
Arkansas Street is the primary north-south street through El Pueblo; 25th Street is the main east-west street. Other arterial roads include: Broadway, which runs north-south along the eastern edge of the neighborhood; 21st Street, which runs east-west along its southern edge; and 29th Street, which runs east-west along its northern edge.

Wichita Transit offers bus service in El Pueblo on its 13, 15, and 17 routes.

BNSF Railway operates freight rail lines which run north-south immediately east of the neighborhood, parallel to Broadway.
