= Midtown, Wichita, Kansas =

Coordinates: 37.695°N 97.362°W

Midtown
- Neighborhood
- Interactive map of Midtown
- Country: United States
- State: Kansas
- County: Sedgwick
- City: Wichita

Population (2016)
  - Total: 11,147
- ZIP code: 67202, 67203, 67214
- Area code: 316

Midtown is a neighborhood in Wichita, Kansas, United States. A mixed commercial and residential area on the east bank of the Little Arkansas River, it is the oldest neighborhood in the city.

== History ==
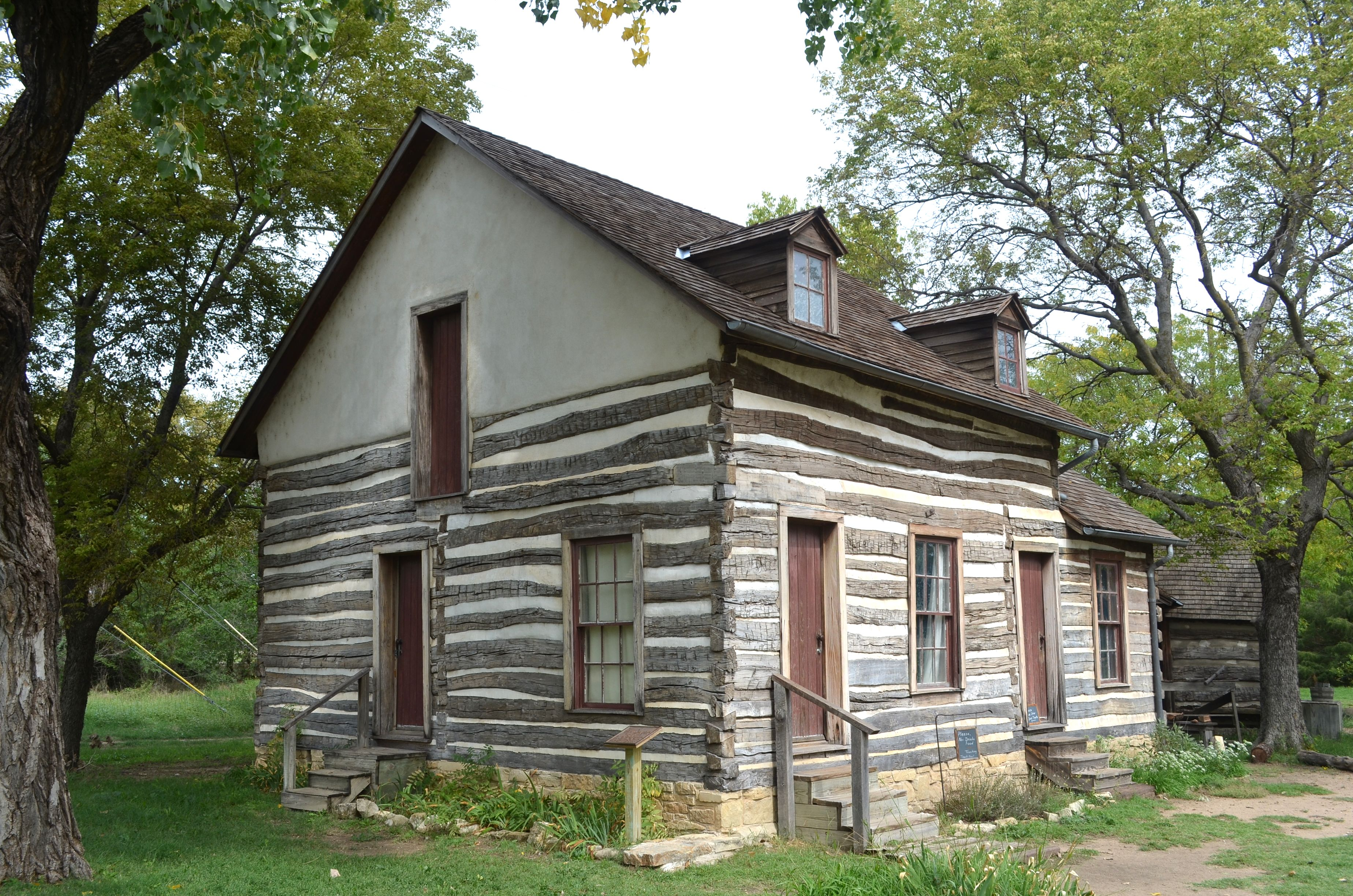
The Darius Munger House (2012)

Present-day Midtown was the original town site of Wichita, first platted in 1865 and initially settled in the late 1860s and 1870s. Postmaster, surveyor, and hotelkeeper Darius Munger built the city’s first house in 1868 at the corner of what are today Waco and 9th Streets. Constructed from cottonwood logs, his house went on to serve as a hotel, justice hall, community center, and post office. By 1869, Munger had built and owned several more buildings. In 1870, he and Bill “Dutch Bill” Griffenstein filed plats laying out the first portions of the city’s street grid, including what would become Main Street and Broadway. Griffenstein attracted businesses by offering free lots on Main Street. Also during this period, the city’s first jail, the Wyatt Earp Jail, and first school both opened in what is today Midtown.

The city subsequently grew northward with settlers initially building Victorian homes on large estates. Property taxes increased with the demand for city services, and residents responded by subdividing and selling off their lots, increasing building density. Further development of Midtown continued through the 1940s when workers from Wichita’s burgeoning aviation industry moved into the neighborhood. By the 1960s, however, Midtown had entered a period of decline.

Beginning in 1972, local residents organized to preserve the neighborhood and worked with the city government to have multiple areas declared to be historic districts.

== Geography ==
Midtown consists of the area between 21st Street to the north, Central Avenue to the south, the Little Arkansas River to the west, and the BNSF/Union Pacific rail corridor to the east. It overlaps with a portion of the Riverside neighborhood to the west. Located immediately north of Downtown Wichita, it lies south of El Pueblo, west of McAdams, and east of North Riverside.

== Government ==
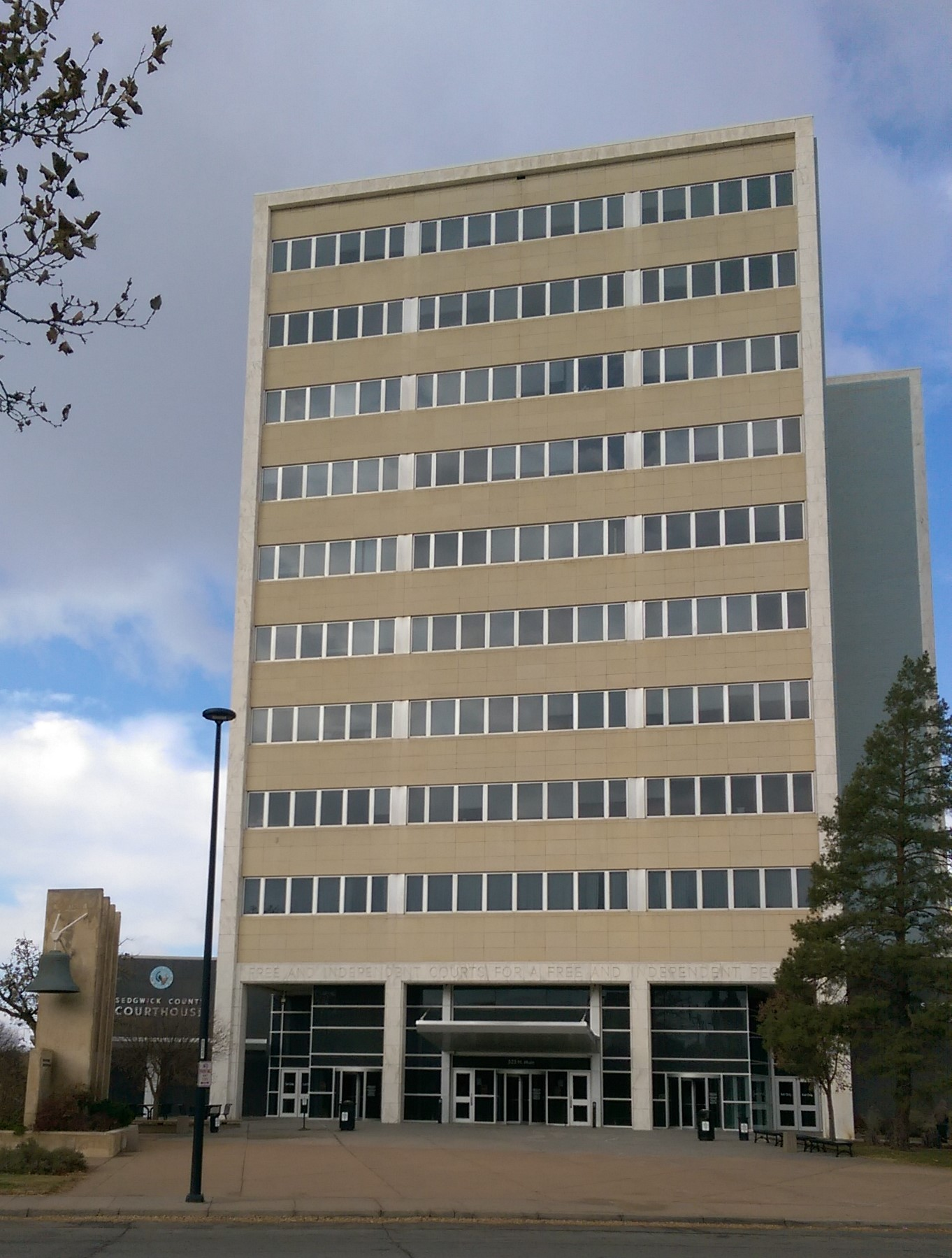
Sedgwick County Courthouse (2018)

For the purposes of representation on the Wichita City Council, Midtown lies within Council District 6.

The Sedgwick County government bases its operations and has several of its offices in Midtown. The old and current county courthouses as well as the sheriff’s office are located in the far southern part of the neighborhood.

For the purposes of representation in the Kansas Legislature, Midtown is located in the 29th district of the Kansas Senate and the 92nd and 103rd districts of the Kansas House of Representatives.

== Education ==
=== Primary and secondary education ===
Wichita Public Schools operates five facilities in Midtown:

- Gateway Alternate Program Center
- Horace Mann Dual Language Magnet
- Irving Elementary School
- Park Elementary School
- Wichita North High School

The Roman Catholic Diocese of Wichita oversees one Catholic elementary school in the neighborhood, St. Patrick School.

== Infrastructure ==
=== Health care ===
Ascension Via Christi St. Francis, one of the city's primary hospitals, is located in Midtown at 9th Street and St. Francis Avenue. Select Specialty Hospital-Wichita, an acute long-term care facility, is also located on the St. Francis campus.

== Media ==
KSNW, the NBC television affiliate in Wichita, broadcasts from studios on North Main Street in Midtown. Another television station, KCTU, maintains studios at 9th and Water Streets in this neighborhood.

== Parks and recreation ==
The city government's Park and Recreation Department maintains six parks in Midtown: Emporia Park, Hope Park, North Woodland Park, Otis Park, Prospect Park, and Victoria Park. Located on North Emporia Avenue, Emporia Park covers 1.09 acres (0.44 ha) and includes a playground. Hope Park, formerly named the Midtown Mini-Park, occupies 0.1 acres (0.040 ha) at the corner of North Emporia Avenue and East 14th Street and hosts a playground. The 20-acre (8.1 ha) North Woodland Park lies on West 21st Street along the east bank of the Little Arkansas River. It includes a playground, a softball diamond, a basketball court, and the Hispanic Senior Center. Otis Park is a small, 0.54-acre (0.22 ha) park located at the intersection of North Market Street and 13th Street along the former path of a rail line. Across 13th Street to the south from Otis Park is Prospect Park, a similar 0.54-acre (0.22 ha) space with a playground. Victoria Park is a 0.37-acre (0.15 ha) space on a traffic island at the intersection of 17th Street and Park Place. It is the site of a National Humane Alliance fountain.

== Culture ==
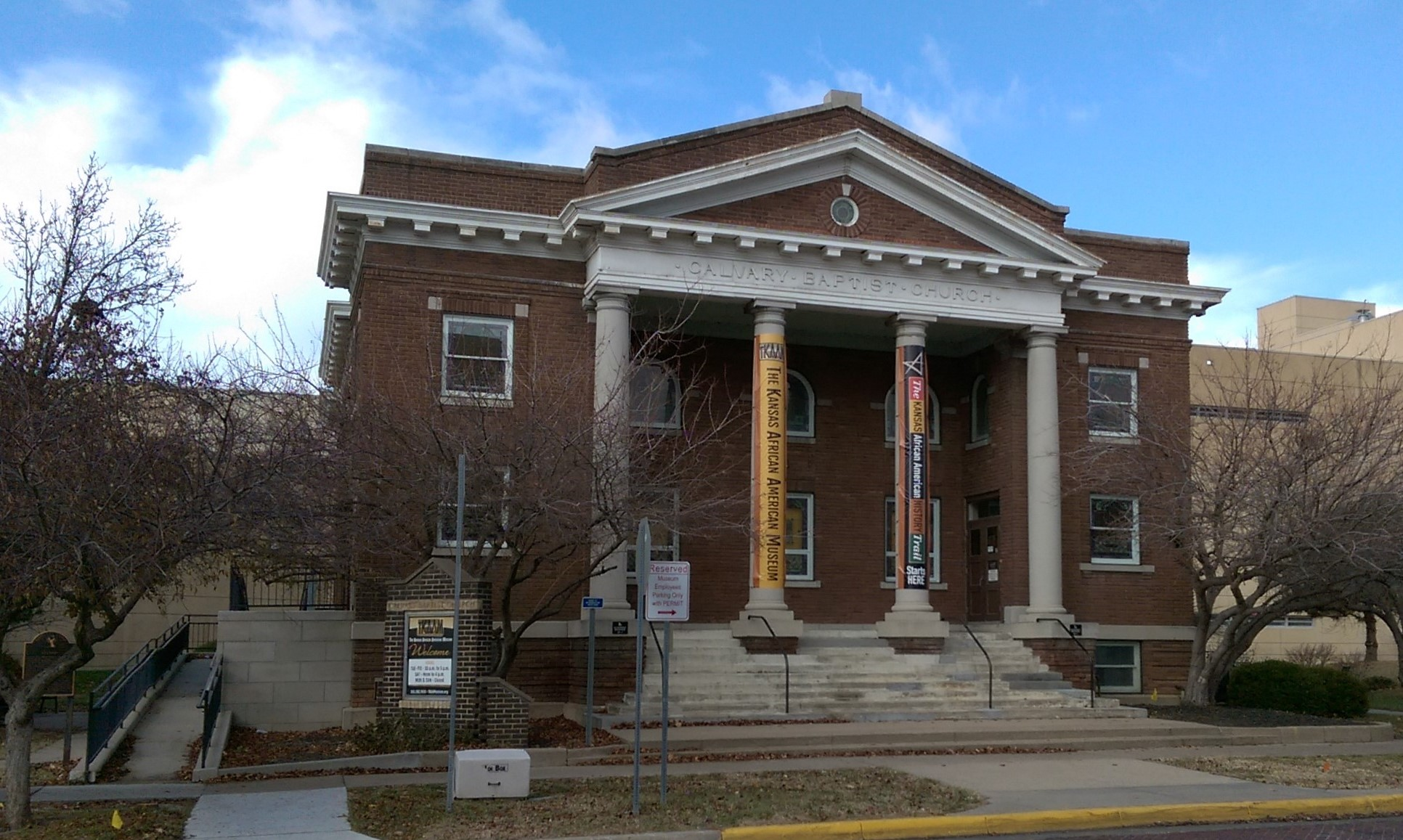
Kansas African American Museum (2018)

=== Points of interest ===
- Kansas African American Museum

== Transportation ==
Broadway is the main north-south street through Midtown. 13th Street and Murdock Street are primary east-west streets. Other arterial roads include: Waco Avenue, which runs north-south several blocks west of Broadway; 21st Street, which runs east-west along the northern edge of the neighborhood; and Central Avenue, which runs east-west along the southern edge of the neighborhood.

Wichita Transit offers bus service in Midtown on its 13, 17, 25, and 27 routes.

BNSF Railway and Union Pacific Railroad operate freight rail lines which run north-south immediately east of Midtown, parallel to Santa Fe Avenue.

== Gallery ==
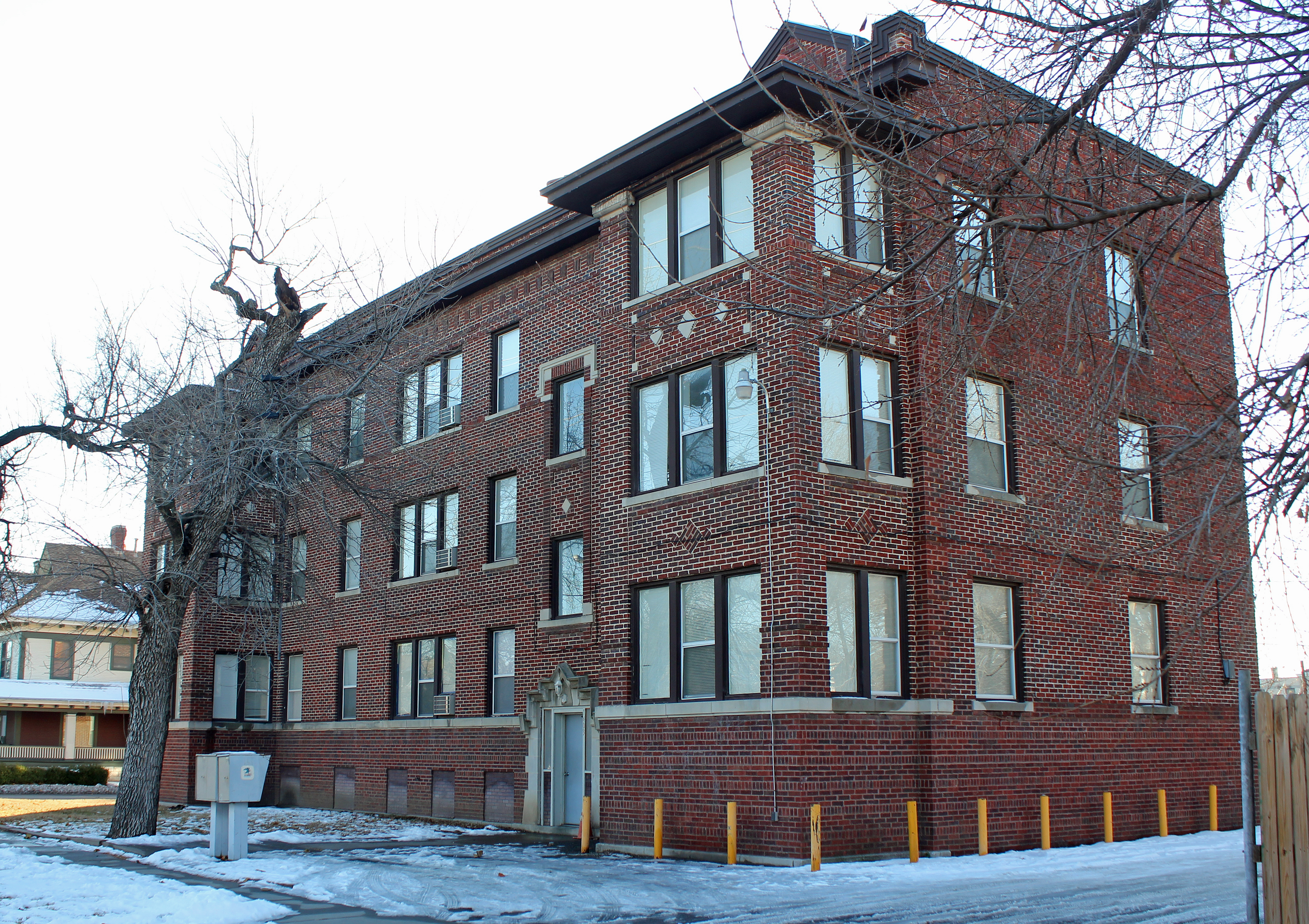
Adeline Apartments (2013)

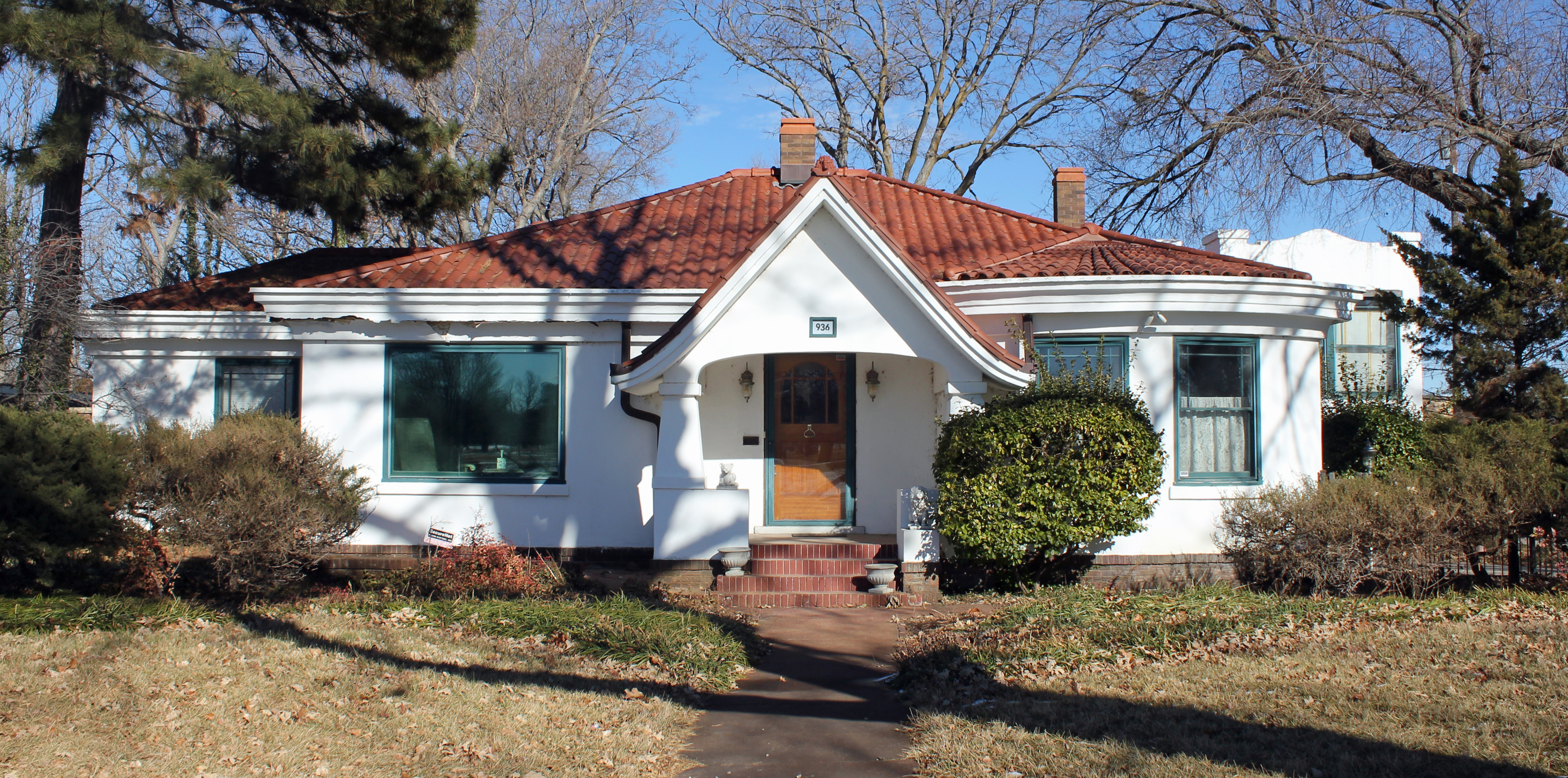
Bond-Sullivan House (2013)

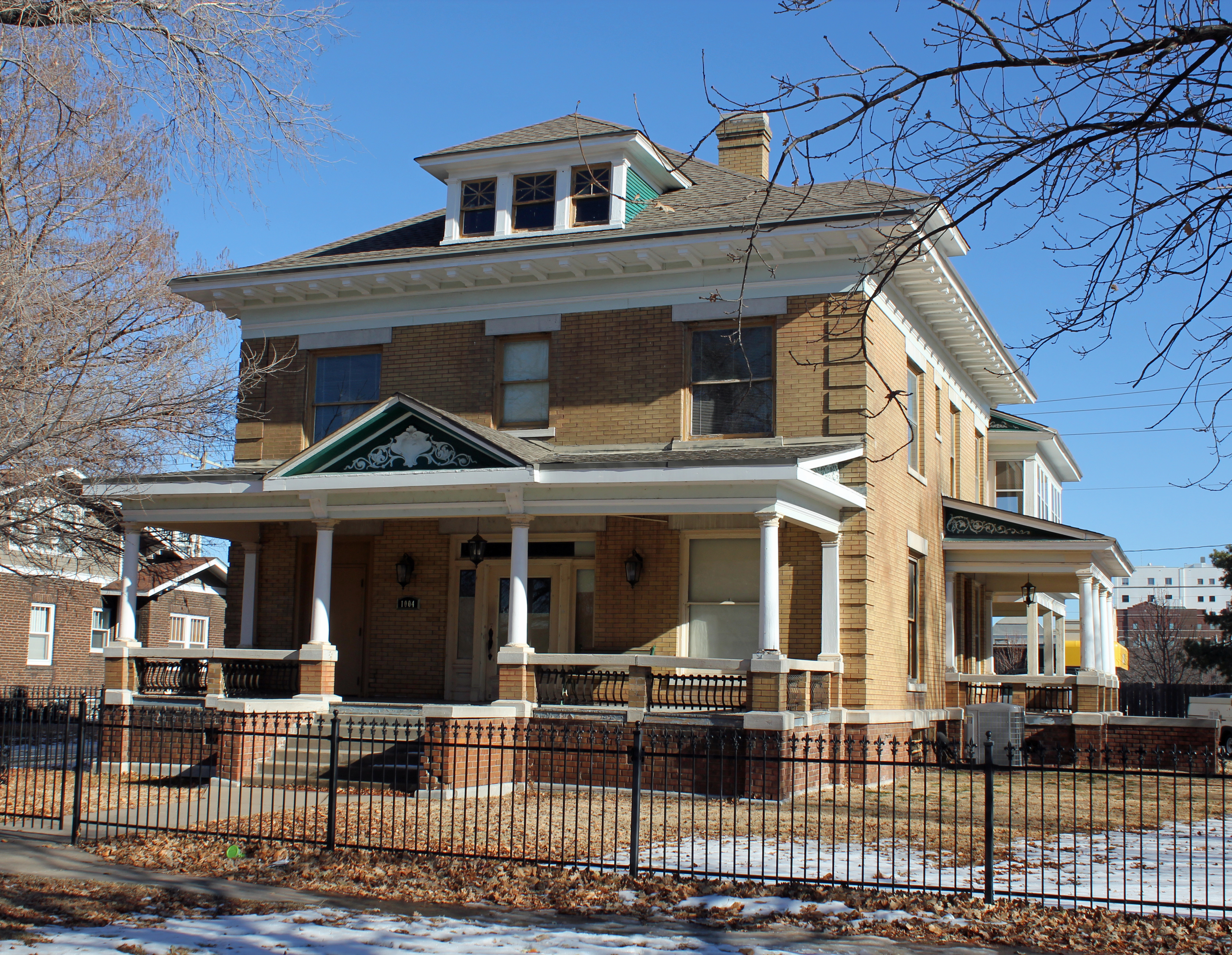
Bowers House (2013)

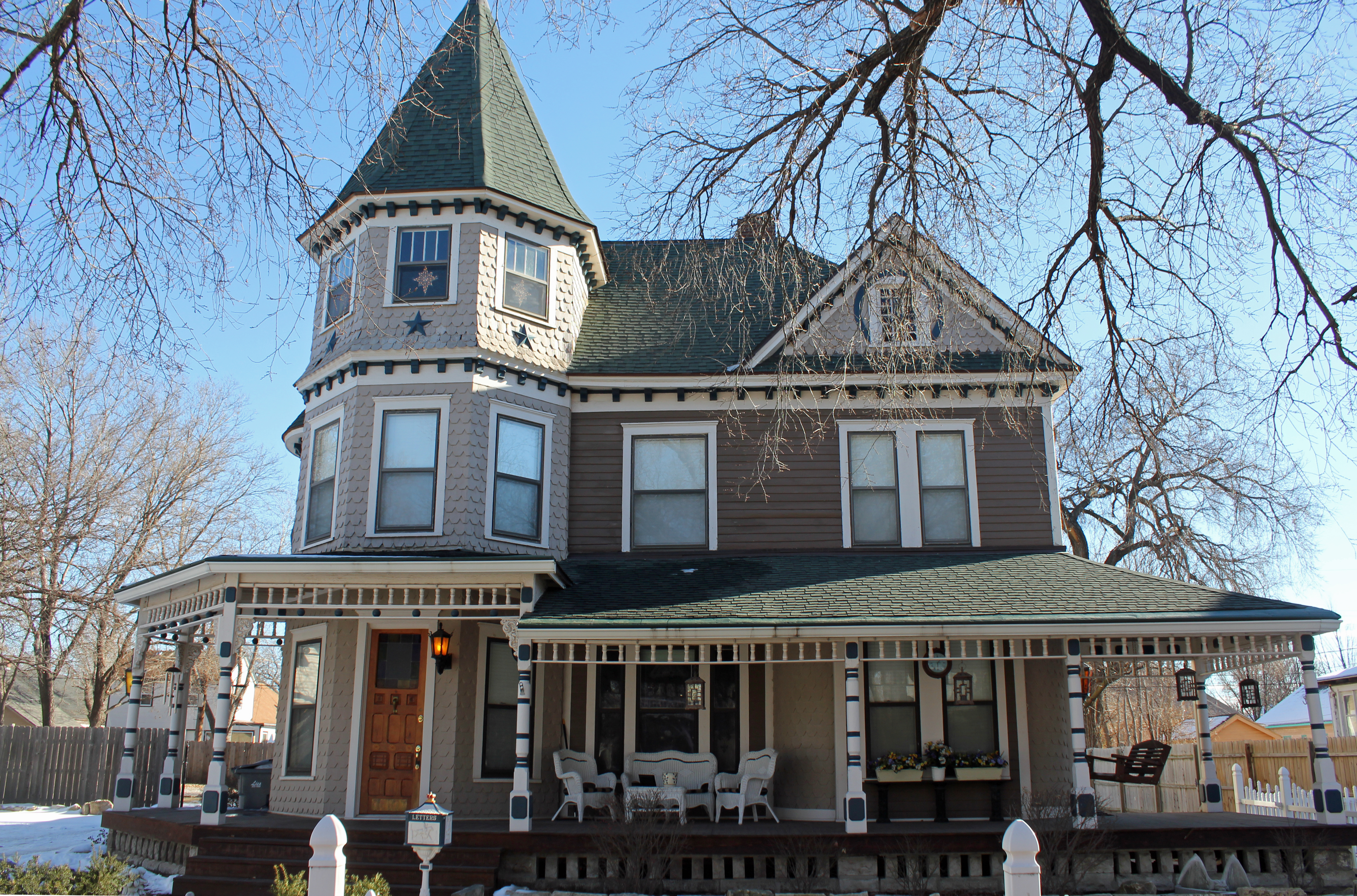
Chapman-Noble House (2013)

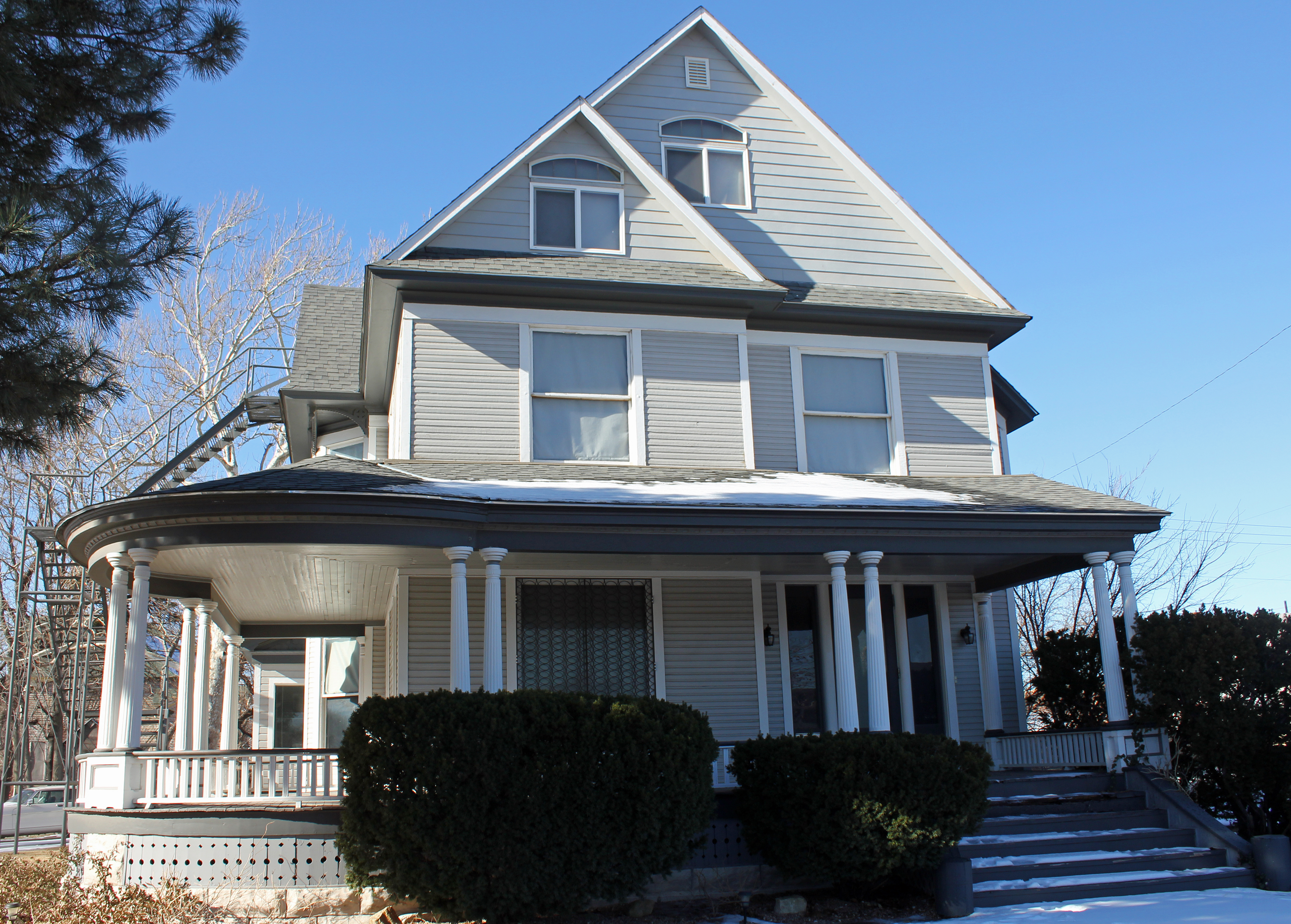
Comley House (2013)

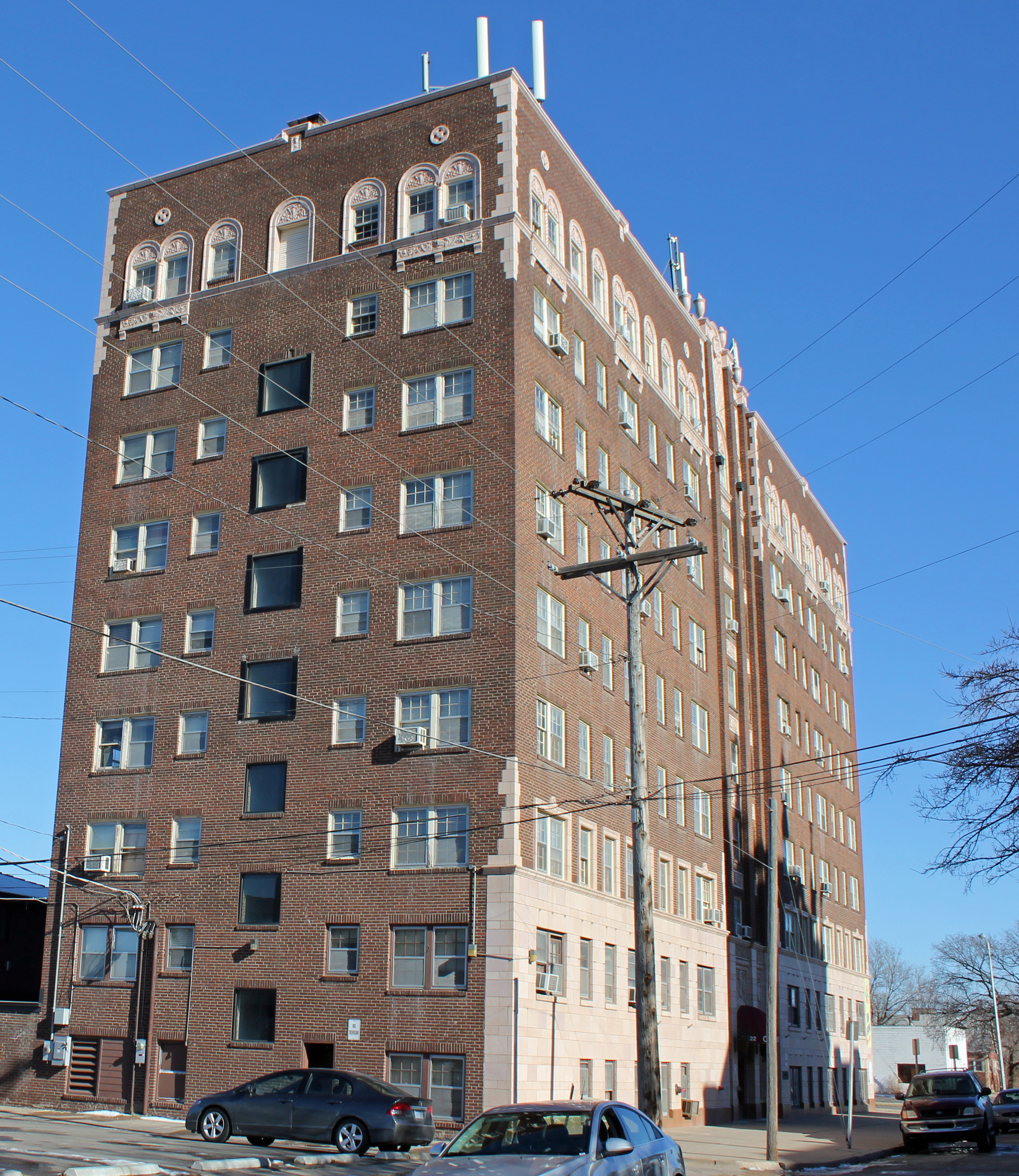
Commodore Apartments (2013)

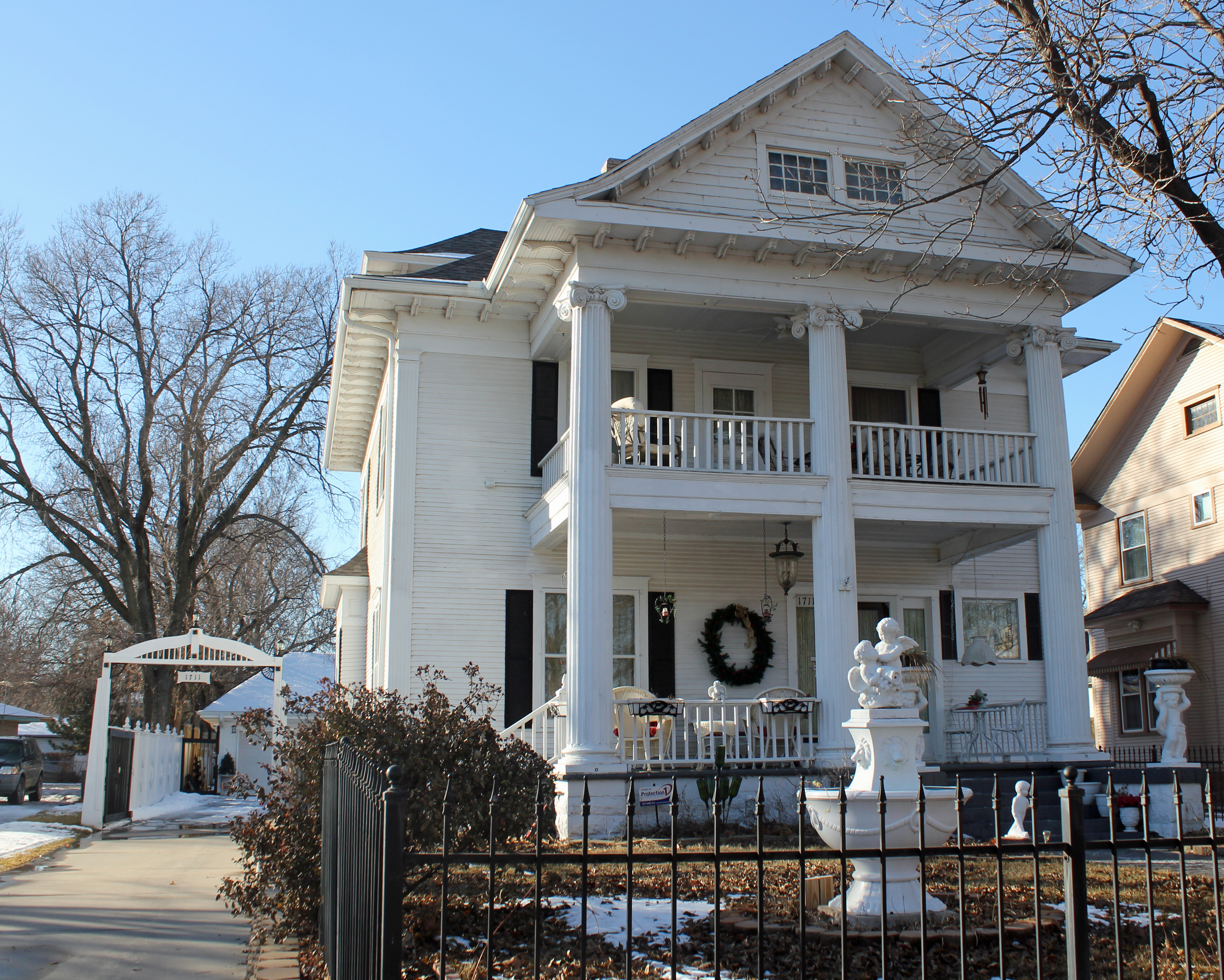
Edward M. Kelly House (2013)

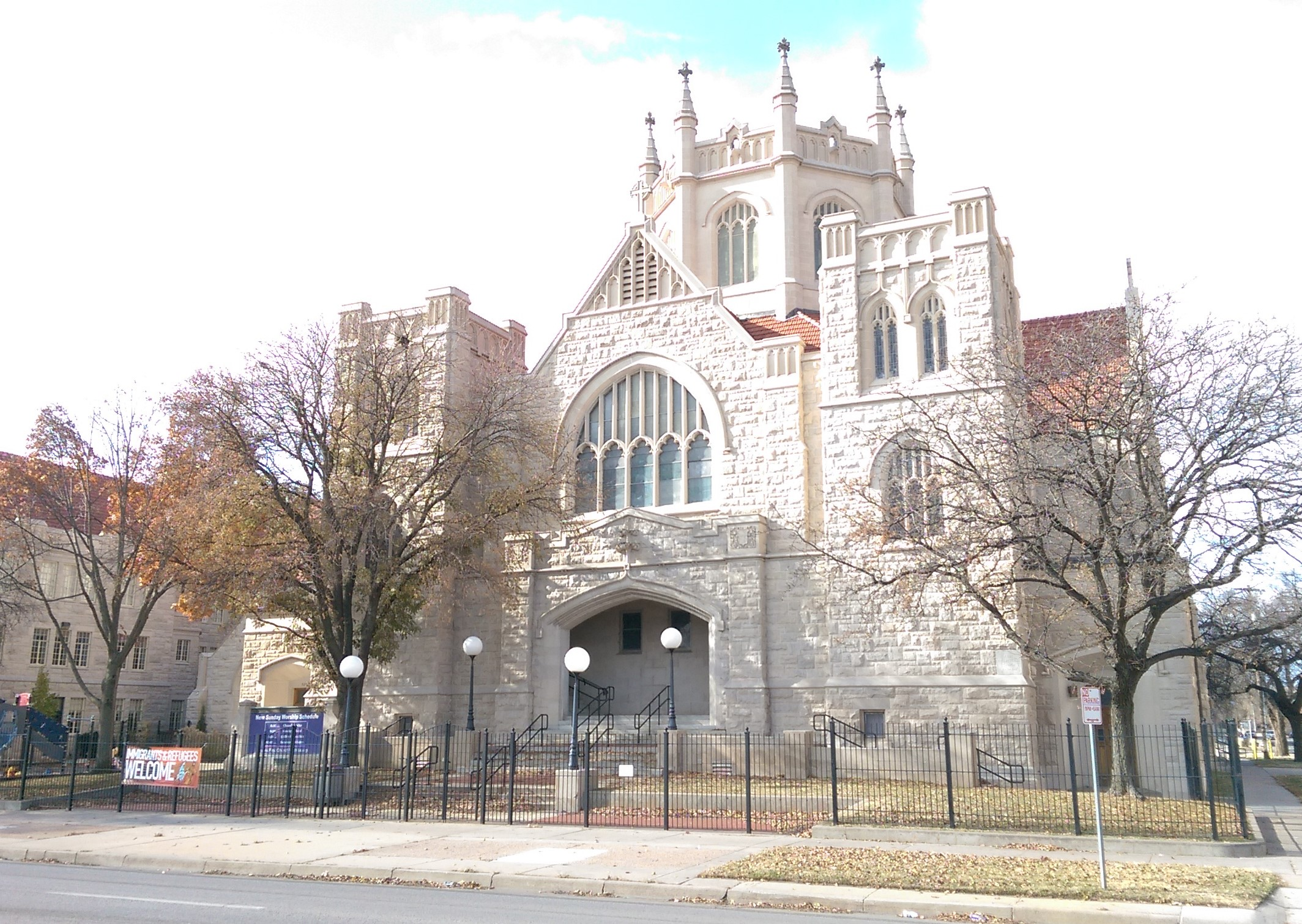
First Presbyterian Church (2018)

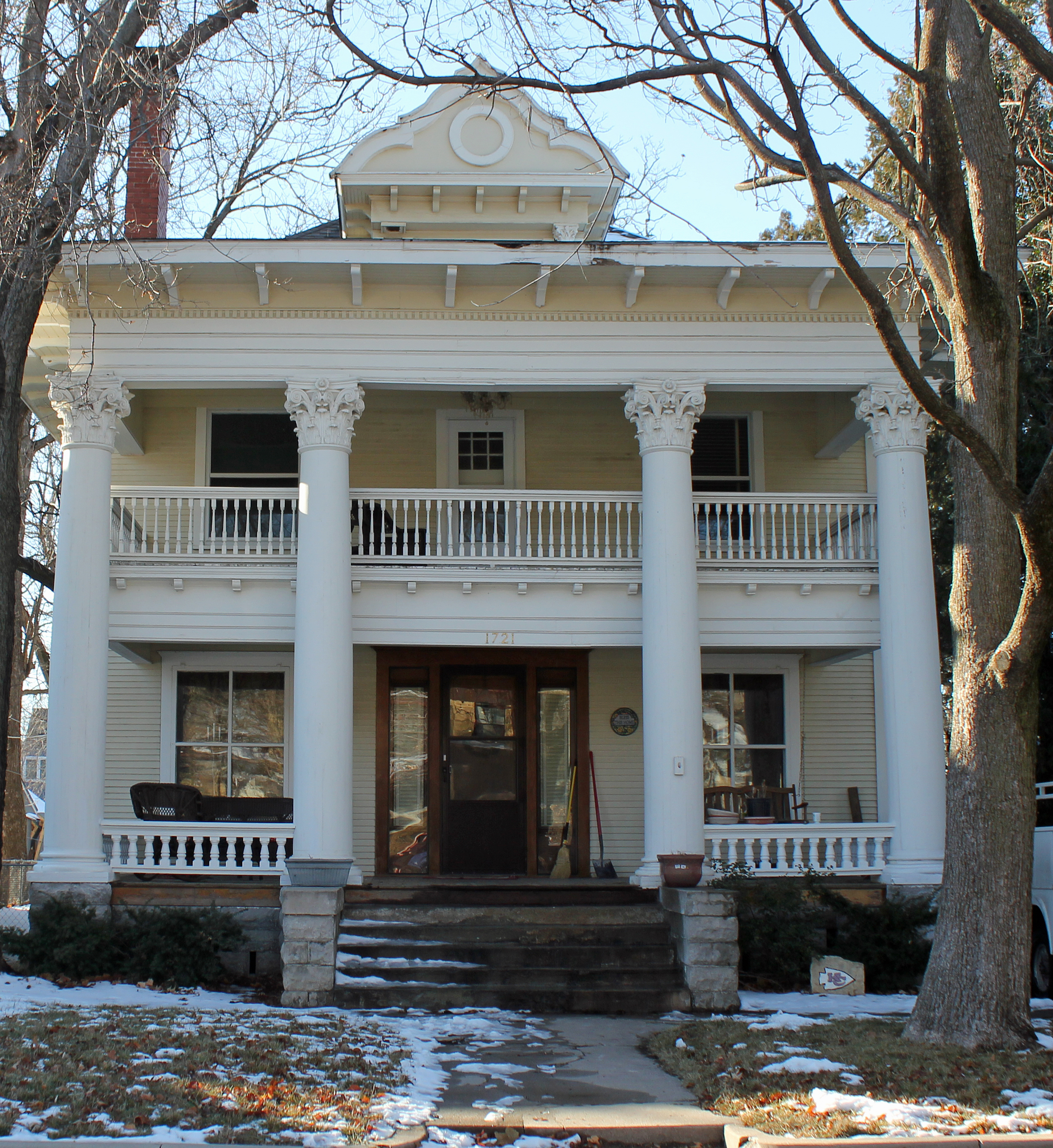
Gelbach House (2013)

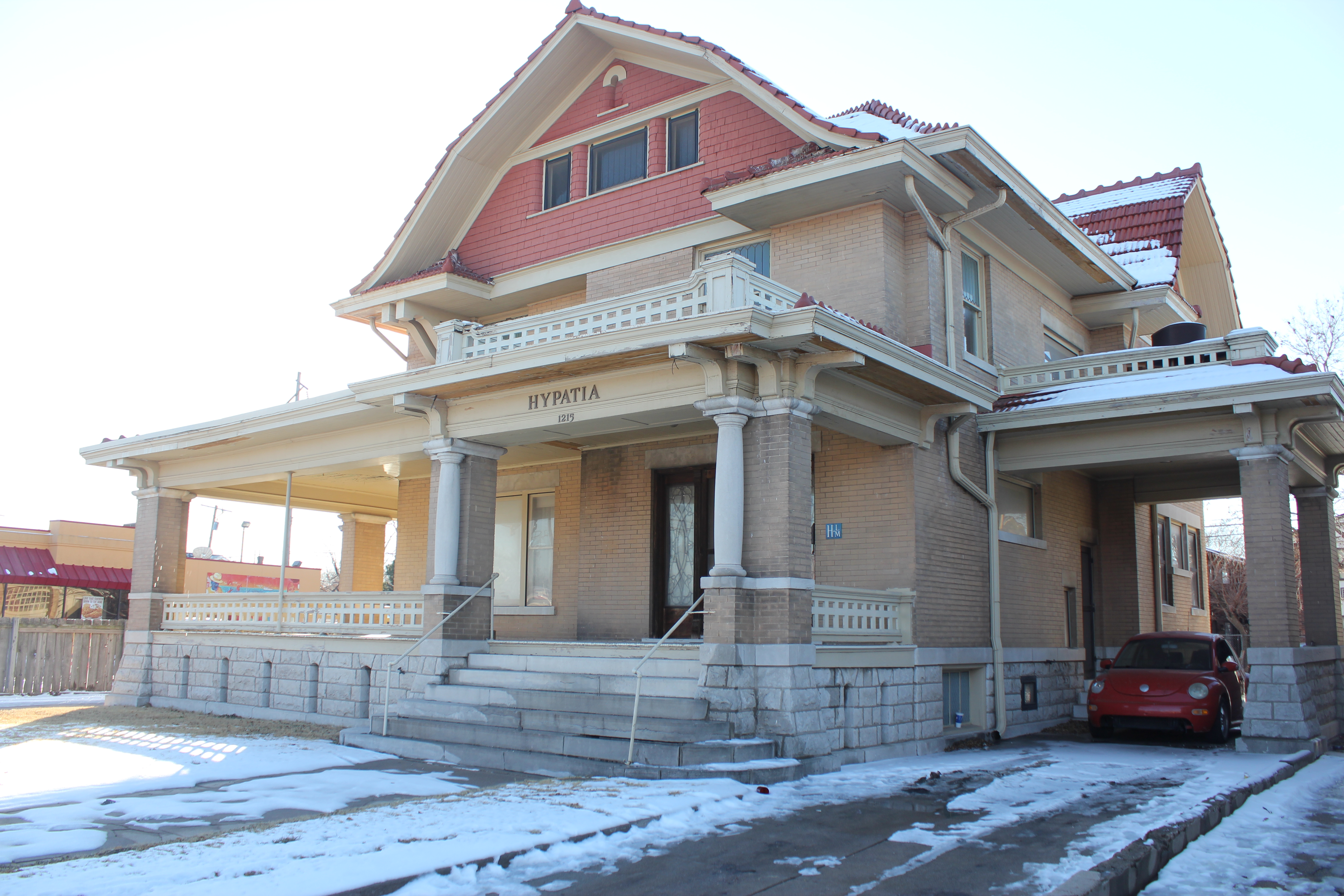
Hypatia House (2013)

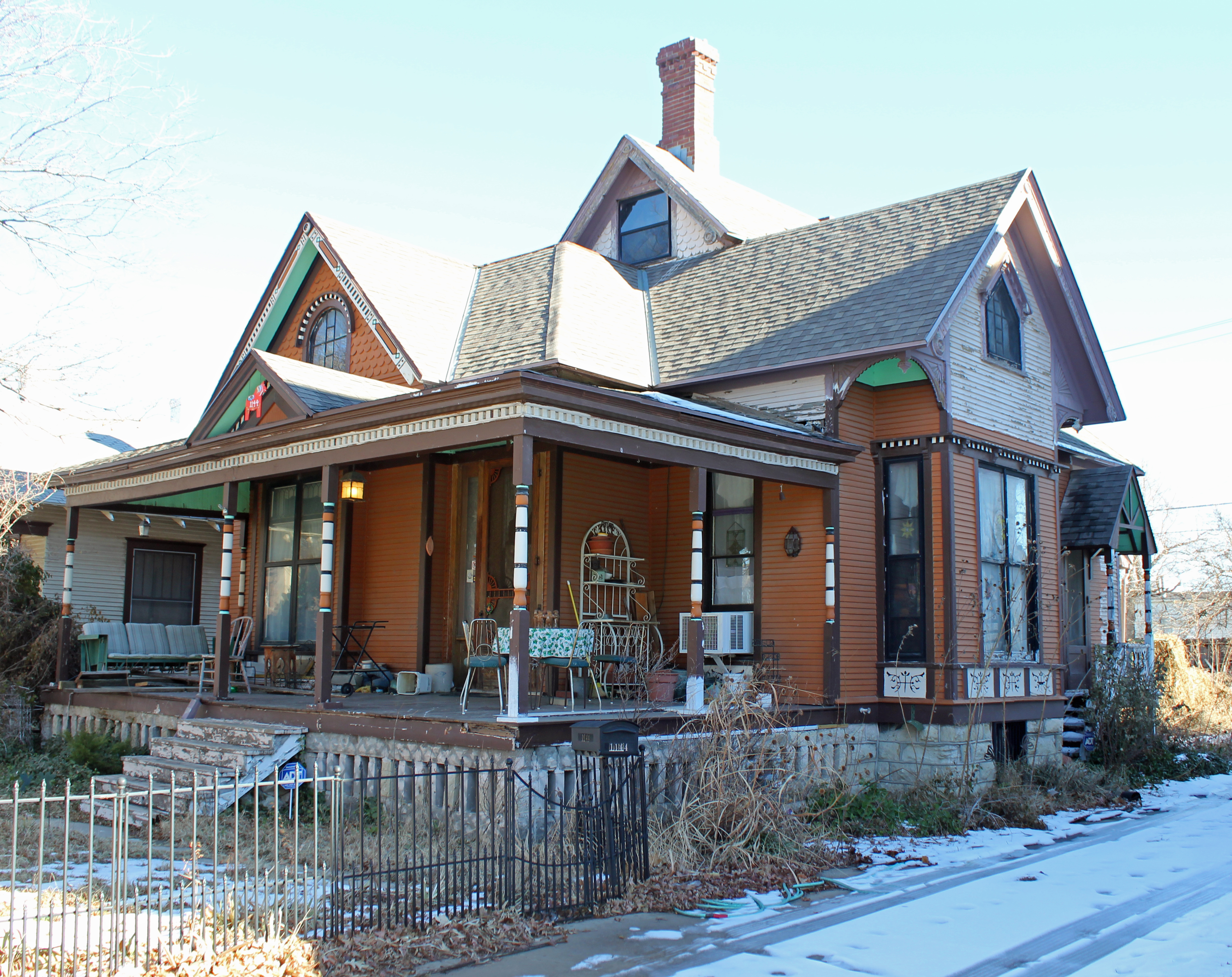
Market Street Cottage (2013)

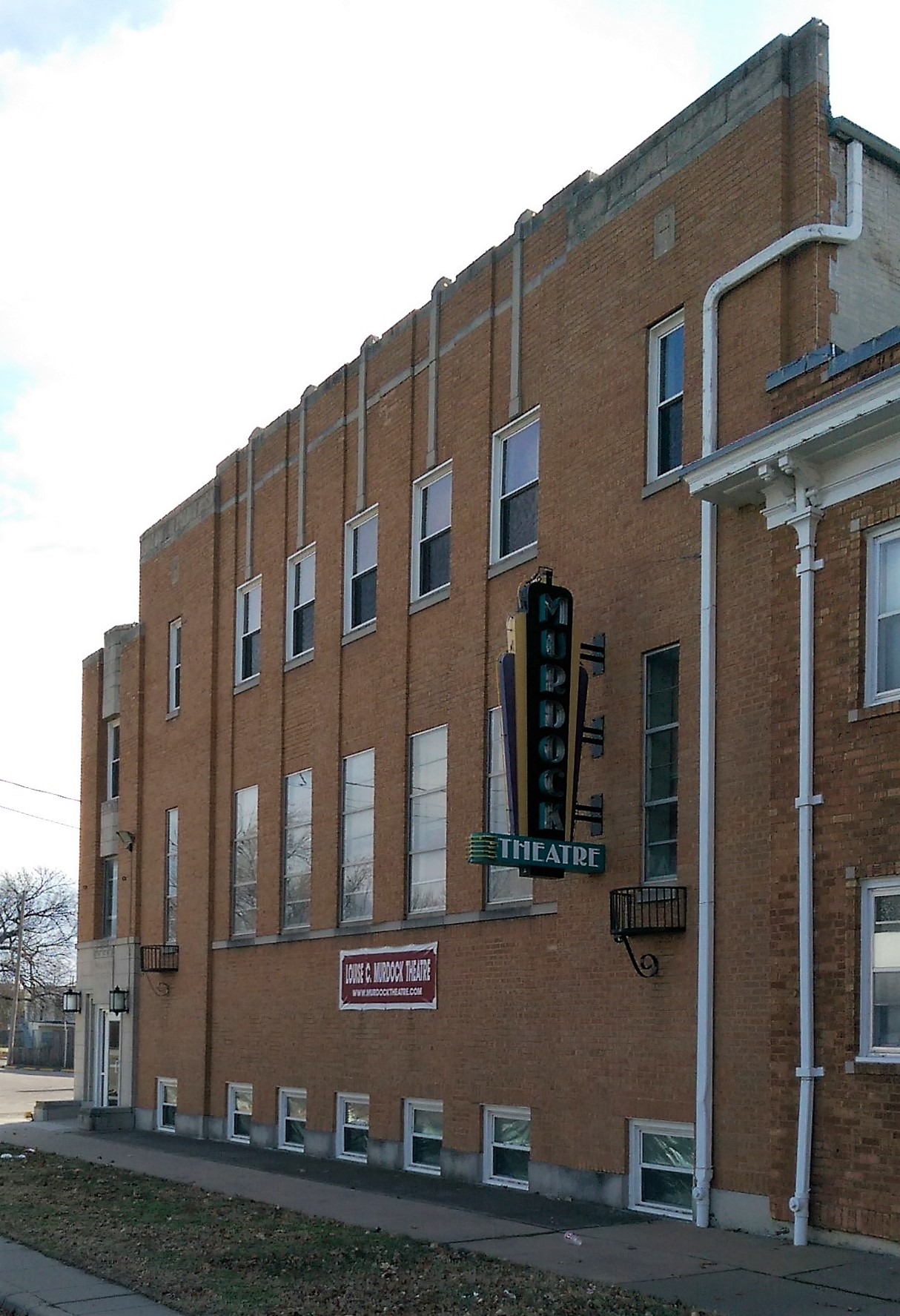
Murdock Theatre (2018)

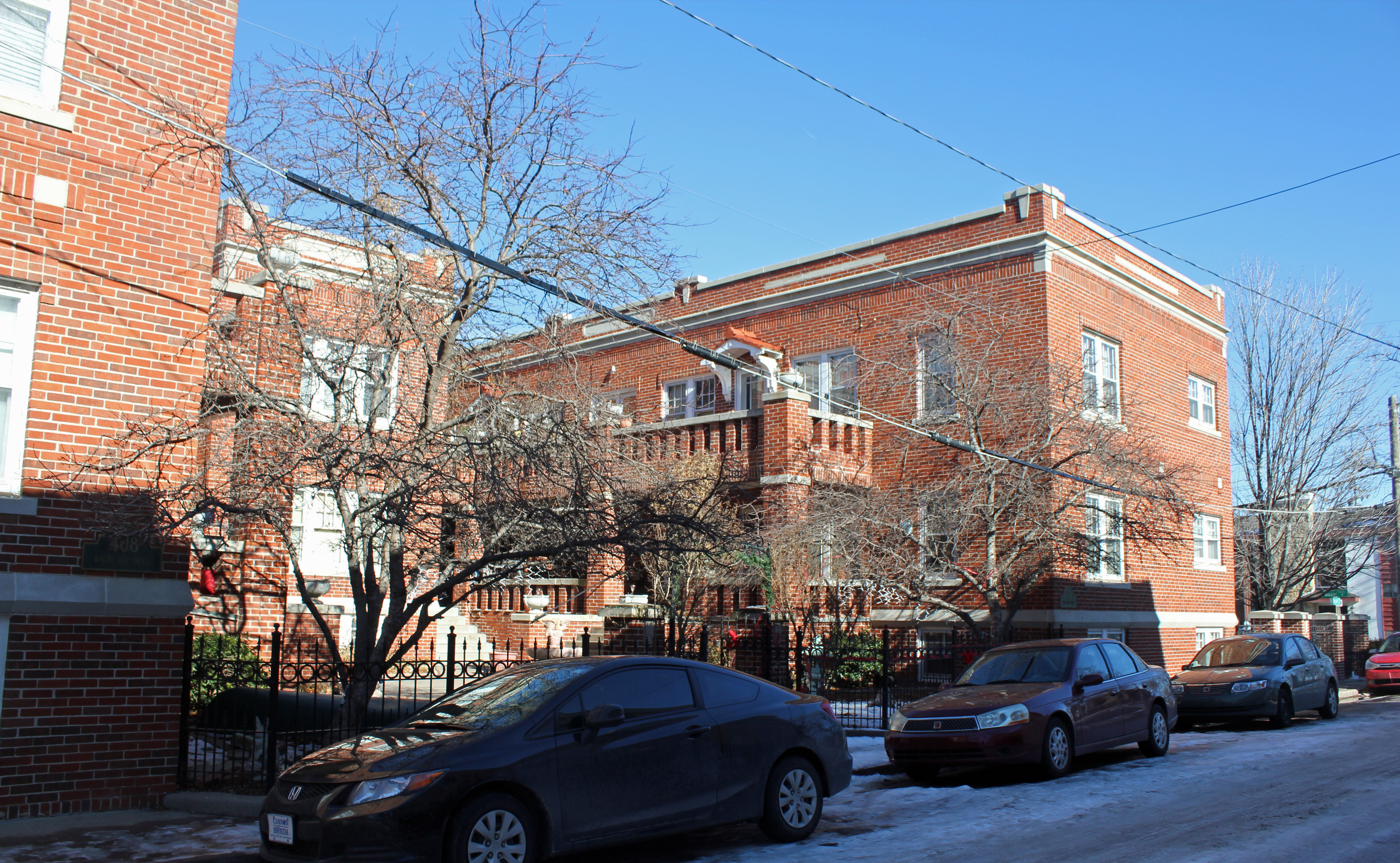
Riverview Apartments (2013)

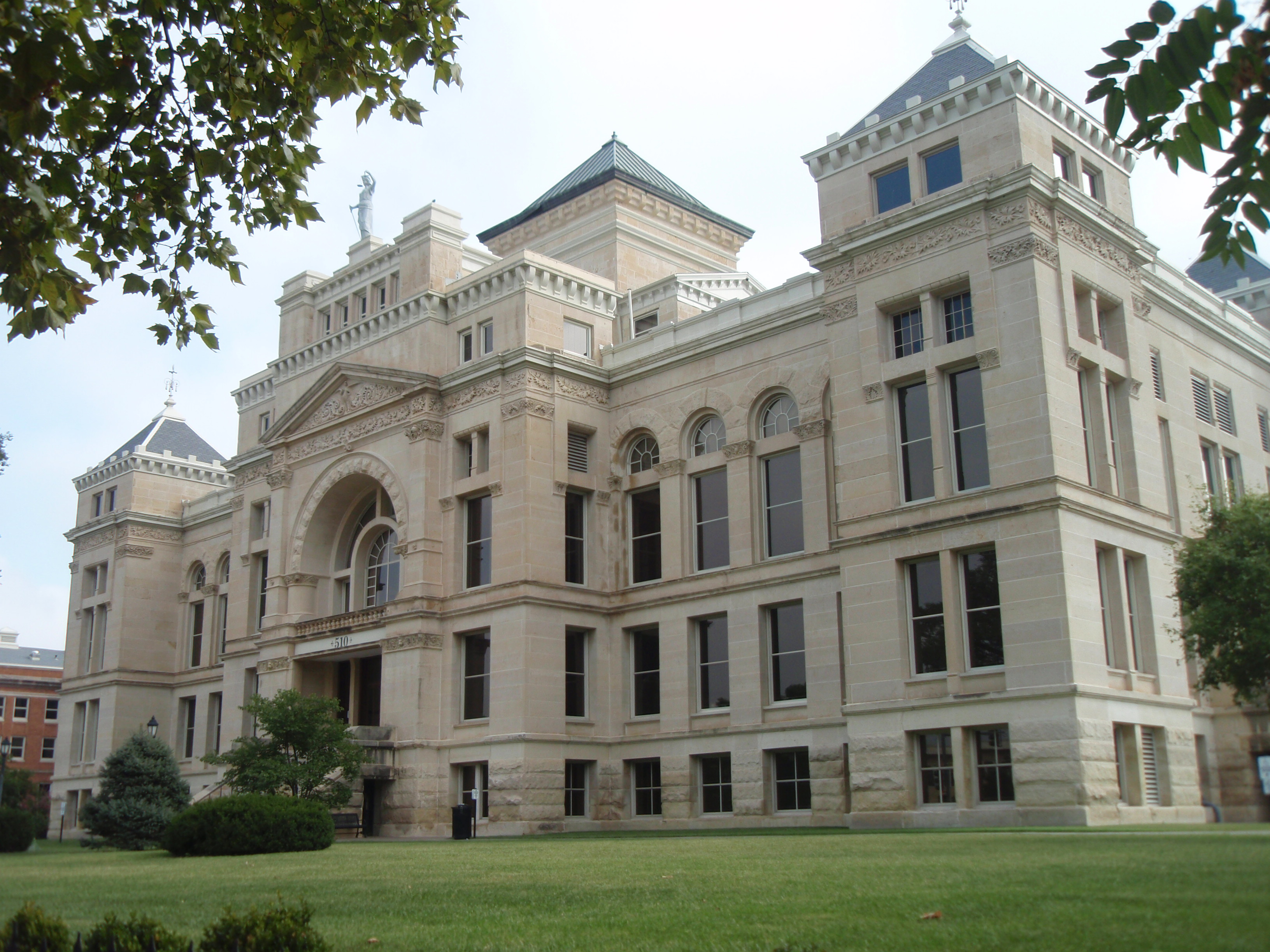
Old Sedgwick County Courthouse (2009)

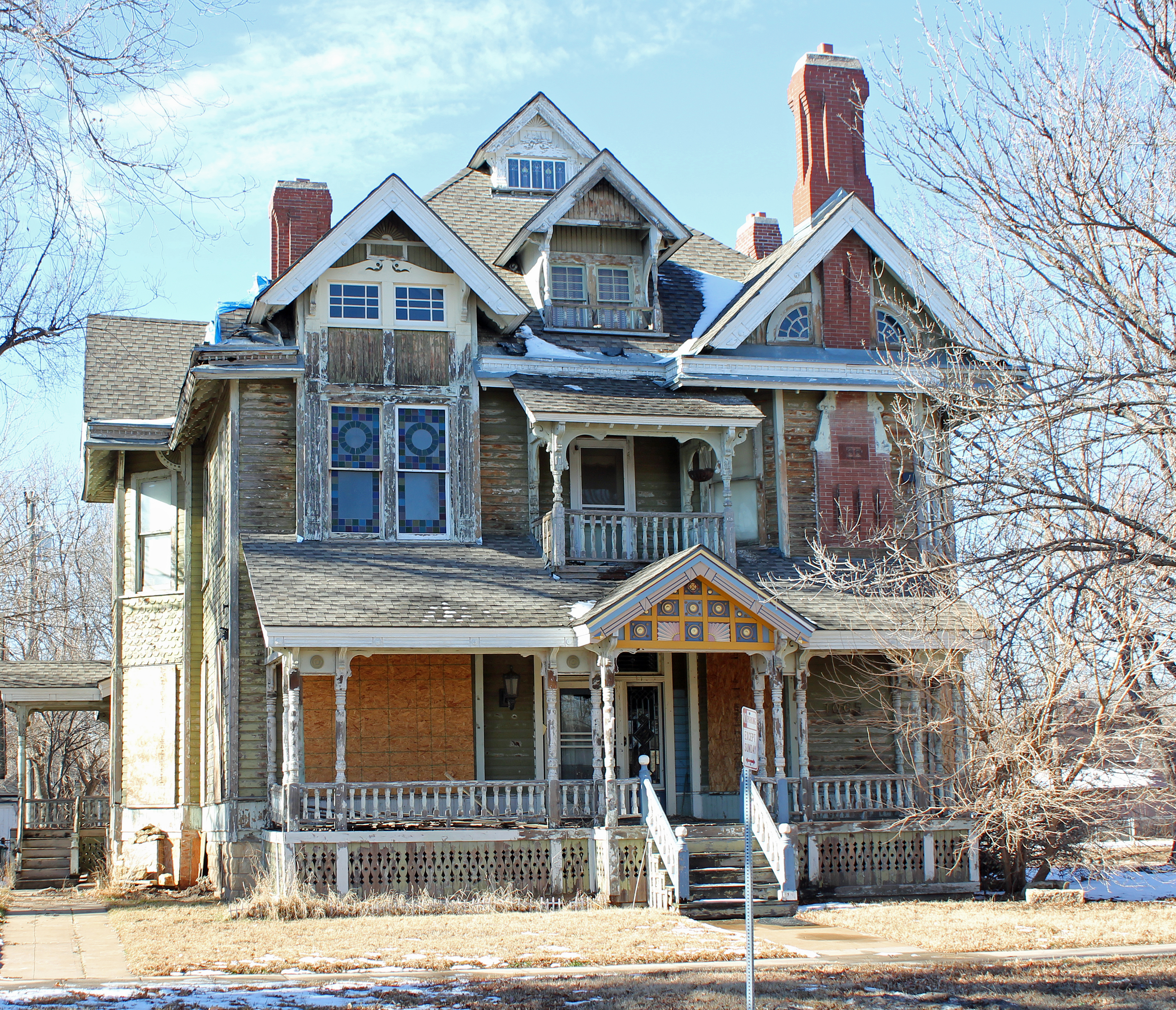
William Sternberg House (2013)
