= Benjamin Hills, Wichita, Kansas =

Benjamin Hills
- Neighborhood
- Interactive map of Benjamin Hills
- Coordinates: 37°43′47″N 97°22′14″W
- Country: United States
- State: Kansas
- County: Sedgwick
- City: Wichita
- Elevation: 1,317 ft (401 m)

Population (2016)
  - Total: 3,824
- ZIP code: 67203, 67204
- Area code: 316

Benjamin Hills is a neighborhood in Wichita, Kansas, United States. A mixed commercial and residential area, it lies on the north bank of the Arkansas River in the northwestern part of the city.

== History ==
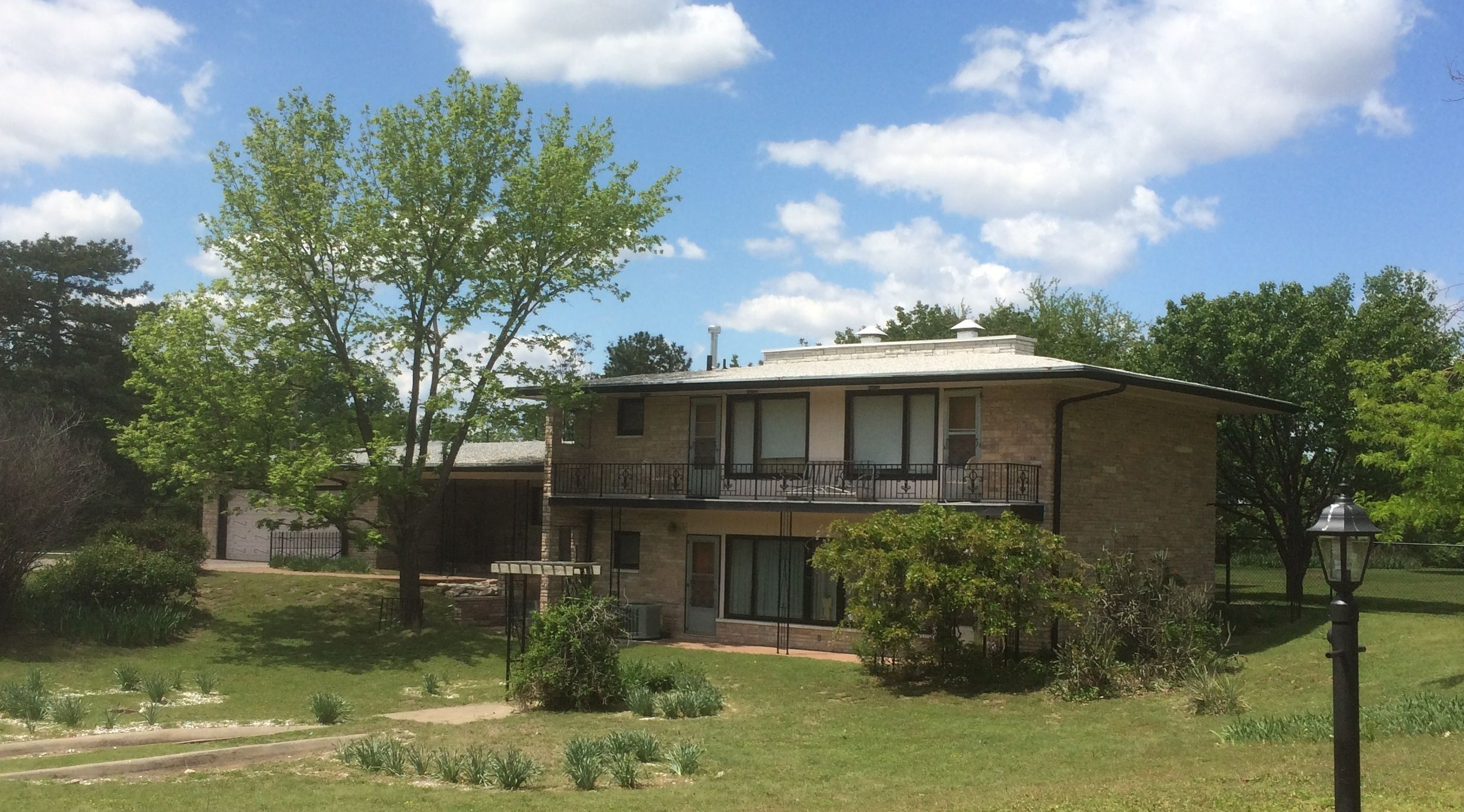
McLean House (2015)

In 1908, former Wichita mayor and prominent banker Ben McLean purchased 464 acres (188 ha) northwest of the city for farming. Upon his death in 1929, the farm was parceled out among his heirs, including his son Drew and daughter-in-law Elizabeth Mabry-McLean. Wichita annexed the farm in 1950, and Elizabeth platted her and her husband's 138-acre (56 ha) portion for development as a residential neighborhood. A graduate of the National Academy of Design, she oversaw the landscaping, street layout, and housing design of the development. The neighborhood was named Benjamin Hills in honor of her son, Ben McLean II, who had been killed in action at the Battle of the Bulge. In 1956, Elizabeth donated the land for McLean Elementary School and had the McLean House, a pink marble ranch-style house she designed with Wichita architect Glenn E. Benedick, built in Benjamin Hills on North McLean Boulevard. Elizabeth continued to oversee development of the neighborhood following her husband's death in 1965 and lived in the McLean House until her death in 2000.

== Geography ==
Benjamin Hills is located at 37°43′47″N 97°22′14″W (37.729722, -97.370556) at an elevation of 1,317 ft (401 m). It consists of the area between 29th Street to the north, the Little Arkansas River to the east, 21st Street and the Arkansas River to the south, and Interstate 235 to the west. The Pleasant Valley neighborhood lies to the north, El Pueblo lies to the east, North Riverside lies to the southeast, Indian Hills Riverbend lies to the south, and Northwest Big River lies to the southwest.

== Government ==
For the purposes of representation on the Wichita City Council, Benjamin Hills is in Council District 6.

For the purposes of representation in the Kansas Legislature, the neighborhood is in the 25th and 29th districts of the Kansas Senate and the 92nd district of the Kansas House of Representatives.

== Education ==
Wichita Public Schools operates one school in Benjamin Hills: McLean Science & Technology Magnet Elementary School.

== Parks and recreation ==
The city's Department of Park and Recreation maintains two parks in the neighborhood. Located at the corner of Columbine Lane and Halstead Street, Columbine Park spans 10.33 acres (4.18 ha) and includes a basketball court, softball diamond, and tennis courts. The 8.1-acre (3.3 ha) K-9 Rooster Dog Park, formerly the Meridian Dog Park, sits on the north bank of the Arkansas River off Meridian Avenue.

== Transportation ==
Amidon Street, which runs north–south, is the main arterial road through Benjamin Hills. 21st Street and 25th Street are the primary east–west routes. The Interstate 235 freeway runs northeast–southwest along the western edge of the neighborhood and is accessible via an interchange at 25th Street.

Wichita Transit offers bus service in Benjamin Hills on its 15 and 17 routes.
