= Riverside, Wichita, Kansas =

Riverside
- Neighborhood
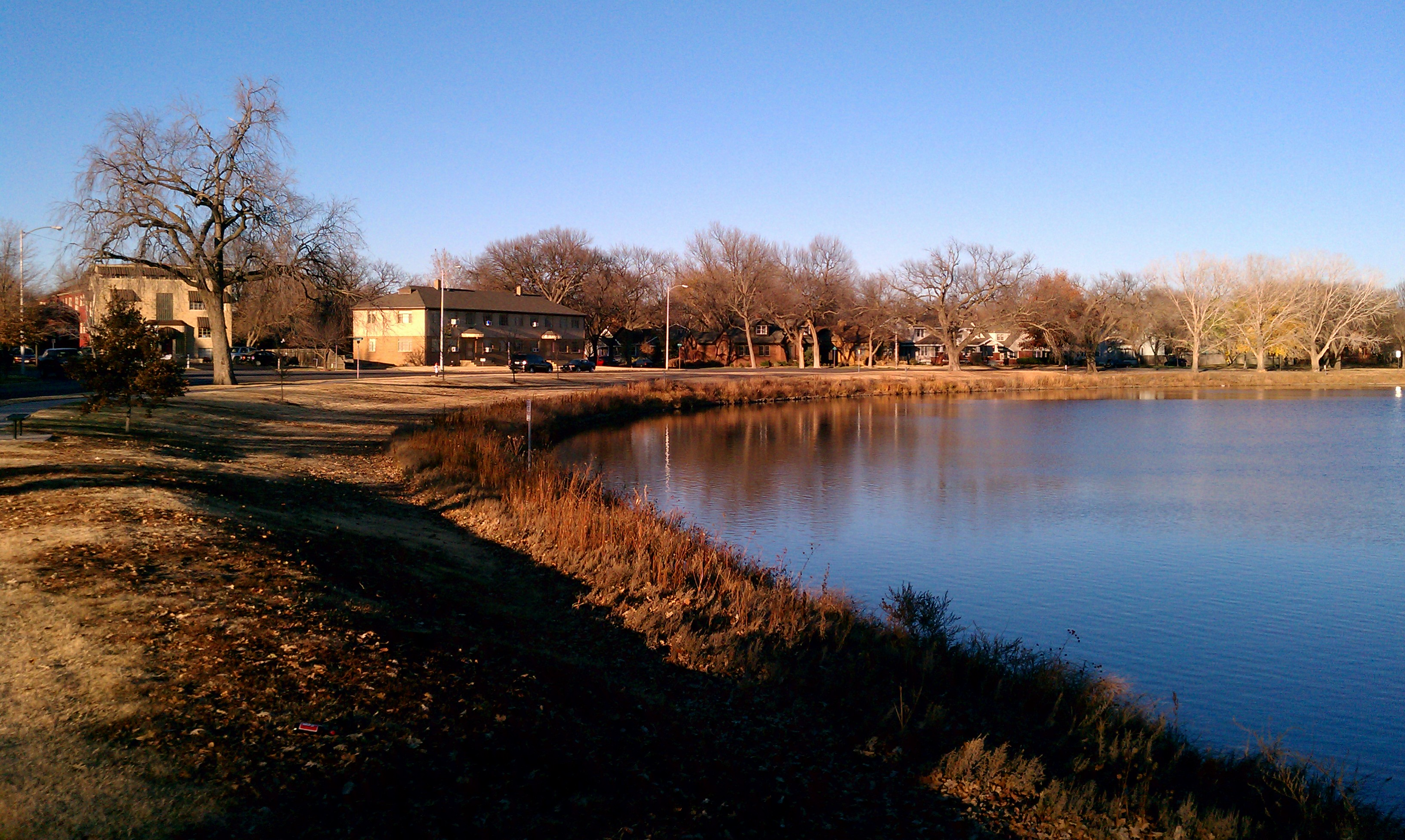
- Riverside homes along Stackman Drive and the Little Arkansas River
- Interactive map of Riverside
- Coordinates: 37°41′55″N 97°21′35″W
- Country: United States
- State: Kansas
- County: Sedgwick
- City: Wichita
- Founded: 1886
- Elevation: 1,306 ft (398 m)

Population (2010)
  - Total: 2,502
- ZIP code: 67203
- Area code: 316

Riverside is a neighborhood in Wichita, Kansas, United States. A mostly residential area located between the Arkansas and Little Arkansas Rivers, it is home to several of the city's museums and large parks.

== History ==
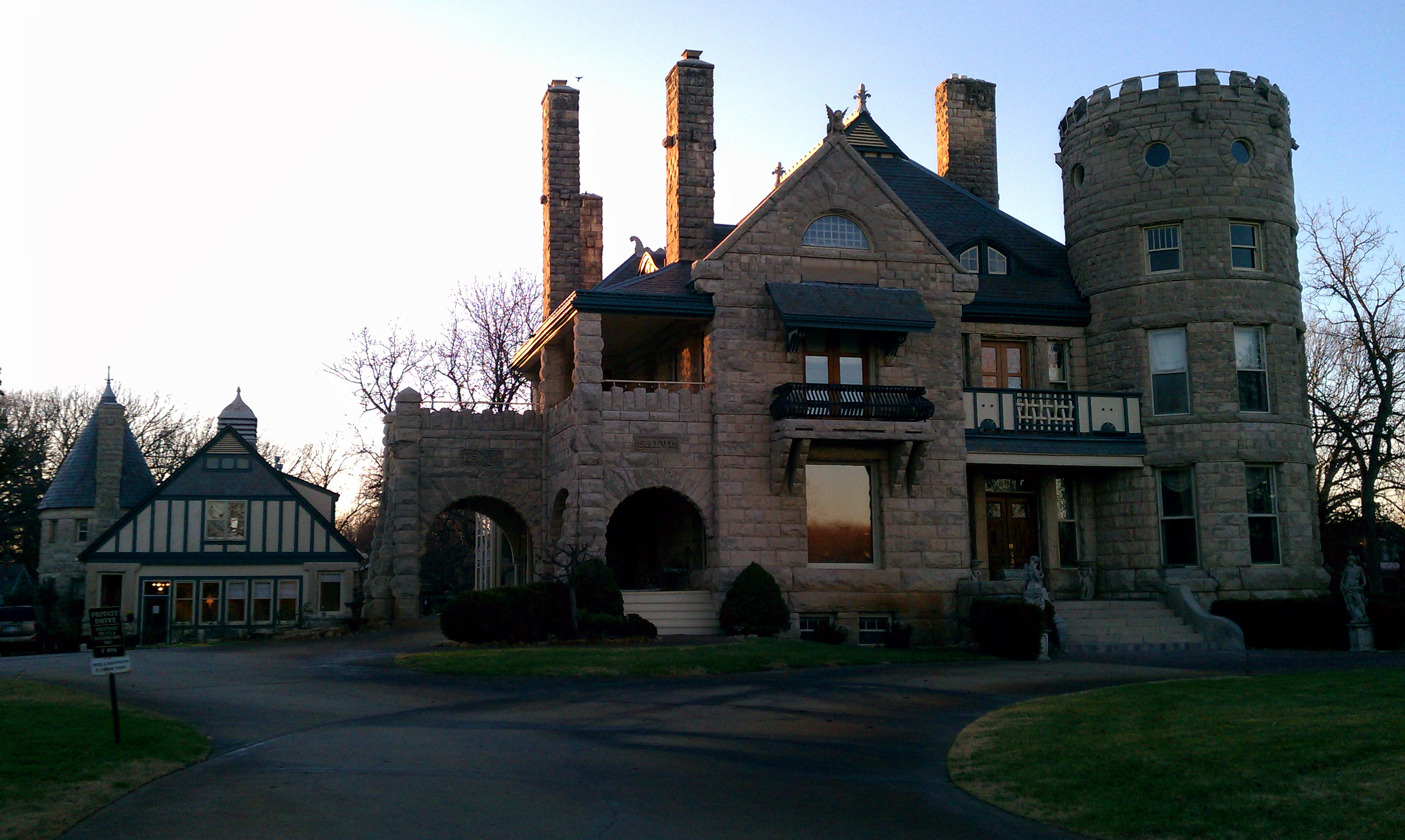
Campbell Castle

Riverside was founded in March 1886 when the Riverside Land Company, led by developer James Oakley Davidson, had the area surveyed and platted. The company intended for the new neighborhood to be Wichita's most stylish residential area and supported the construction of bridges and a trolley line to connect it to downtown. The local real estate market collapsed the next year, however, and development stalled for a decade. By 1889, several of the company's investors, including Davidson and Burton Campbell, had built large, luxurious homes for themselves. Campbell's mansion, modeled after a Scottish castle, became known as Campbell Castle or Crumb Castle locally and was eventually designated a historical landmark.

In 1897, the Wichita city government purchased land in the neighborhood and began developing parks. It also built two more bridges, increasing access to the area and attracting more home buyers. Riverside became a popular recreational area for local residents, and development continued over the ensuing decades. The Riverside Boathouse opened on the Little Arkansas River in the late 1890s followed by a zoo in Central Riverside Park in 1921 and a public swimming pool in South Riverside Park in 1923. The Wichita Art Museum opened in 1935. In 1938, the Works Progress Administration replaced the pool with a second pool called Municipal Beach.

Charles A. Goodrum wrote a book in 1967 titled "I'll Trade You An Elk", about his father Bernie Goodrum’s (the Director of Recreation for the city of Wichita in the late 1930’s) experience running the zoo. It was turned into a television movie in 1970 and aired on The Wonderful World of Disney.

Beginning in the 1960s, further development changed Riverside dramatically as new sites opened and others closed. The Boathouse was demolished in the 1960s as part of an urban renewal program. Similarly, the zoo was closed and torn down in 1973 with the opening of the Sedgwick County Zoo in the western part of the city. In the 1970s, the city funded the construction a new facility for the Art Museum. To commemorate the United States Bicentennial, the city had The Keeper of the Plains, a 44-foot steel sculpture by artist Blackbear Bosin, erected at the confluence of the Arkansas and Little Arkansas Rivers in 1974. The Mid-America All-Indian Center opened in 1976. That same year, the public Ralph Wurz Tennis Center opened on the former site of Municipal Beach. In 1987, the city opened Botanica, The Wichita Gardens in Riverside.

Today, Riverside is regarded as a historic neighborhood known for its architecture and as a cultural and recreational center in Wichita. It has also become a popular residential area for college students and young professionals.

== Geography ==
Riverside is located at 37°41′55″N 97°21′35″W (37.698611, -97.359722) at an elevation of 1,306 feet (398 m). The Arkansas River forms its western and southern border, 13th Street North its northern border, and Bitting Street, the Little Arkansas River, and Nims Street its eastern border. The confluence of the two rivers forms the neighborhood's southeastern corner. Located immediately northwest of Downtown Wichita, Riverside borders Midtown to the east and North Riverside to the north. Delano lies across the Arkansas River to the south; Indian Hills lies across the river to the west.

== Government ==
For the purposes of representation on the Wichita City Council, Riverside lies within Council District 6.

For the purposes of representation in the Kansas Legislature, Riverside is located in the 25th and 29th districts of the Kansas Senate and the 92nd district of the Kansas House of Representatives.

== Education ==
Wichita Public Schools operates one facility in the neighborhood: Riverside Leadership Magnet Elementary School.

== Parks and recreation ==
The Wichita Department of Park and Recreation maintains five parks in Riverside: Oak Park, Sim Park, Central Riverside Park, North Riverside Park, and South Riverside Park. Situated on West 11th Street, Oak Park occupies 37.5 acres (15.2 ha) on the east bank of the Little Arkansas River and includes a frisbee disc golf course, nature trails, and a natural habitat area. 181.48-acre (73.44 ha) Sim Park lies on the east bank of the Arkansas River and is divided into several areas: the Arthur B. Sim Municipal Golf Course, a large picnic area, a natural habitat area, Botanica, and the Old Cowtown Museum. The park also includes a fitness trail with exercise stations.

The three Riverside Parks form the heart of the city park system. The largest, Central Riverside Park, spans 58 acres (23 ha) on the west bank of the Little Arkansas River and hosts an open air bandstand, playground, and interactive water fountain as well as outdoor art sculptures and historic structures. It is also home to the city's Spanish-American Memorial and a small zoo, the Kansas Wildlife Exhibit. North Riverside Park covers 30 acres (12 ha) on the river's east bank immediately southeast of Oak Park. It is the site of several historical structures including Park Villa, a stone and tile-roofed meetinghouse used for community gatherings. The 30-acre (12 ha) South Riverside Park sits on West Central Avenue in a horseshoe bend of the Little Arkansas's course and is home to the Ralph Wurz Riverside Tennis Center.

== Culture ==
=== Points of interest ===
- Botanica, The Wichita Gardens
- The Keeper of the Plains
- Mid-America All-Indian Center
- Old Cowtown Museum
- Wichita Art Museum

== Transportation ==
Nims is the main north-south street through Riverside. North of River Boulevard, its name changes to Bitting Street. River Boulevard follows a winding course along the west bank of the Little Arkansas River. South of Murdock Street, its name changes to Stackman Drive. Other arterial roads include 13th Street, which runs east-west along the northern edge of the neighborhood, and Seneca, a north-south street which enters Riverside from the south and turns east to become Central Avenue.

Wichita Transit offers bus service to Riverside on its 17 route.

== Gallery ==
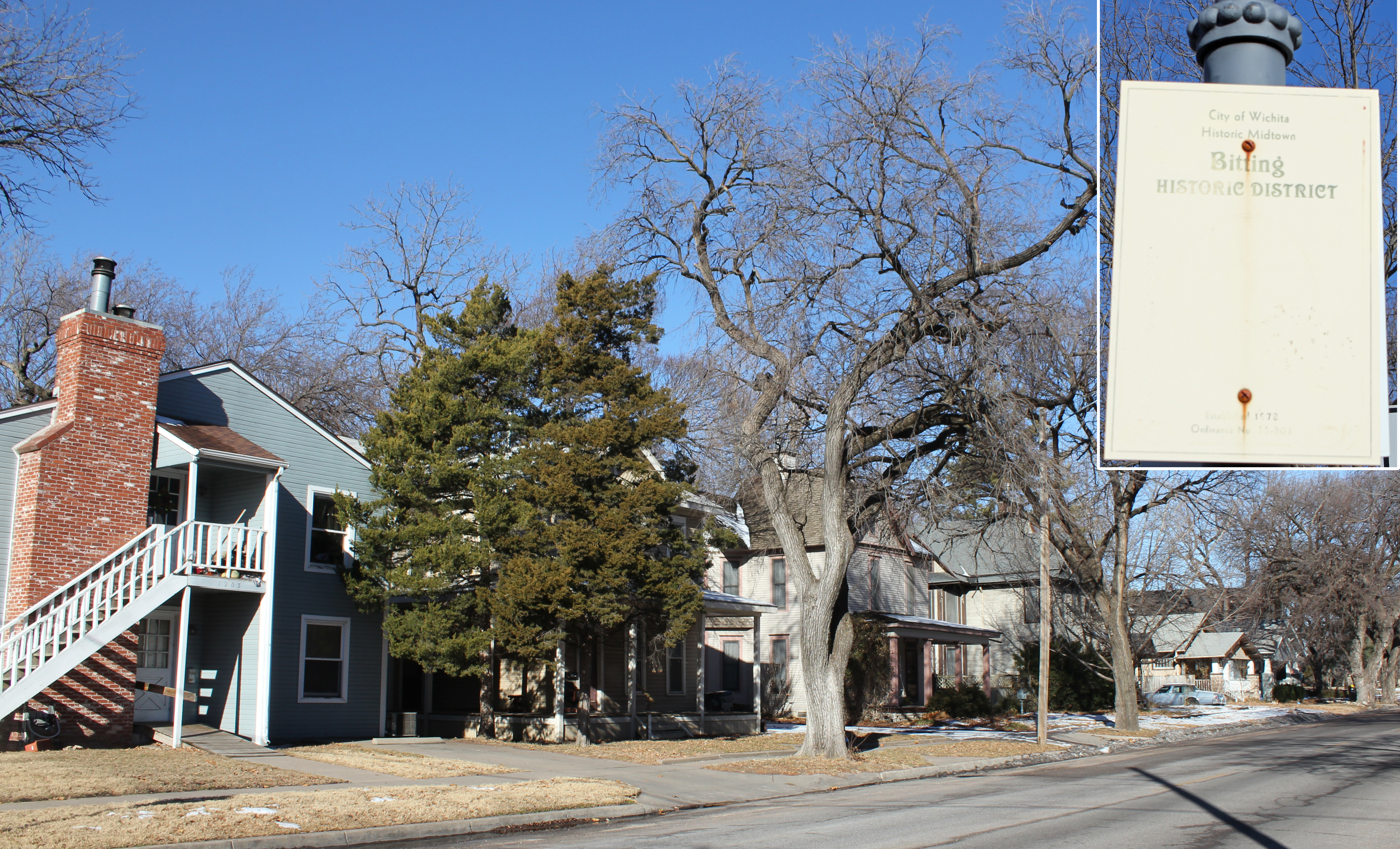
Bitting Historic District

The Keeper of the Plains

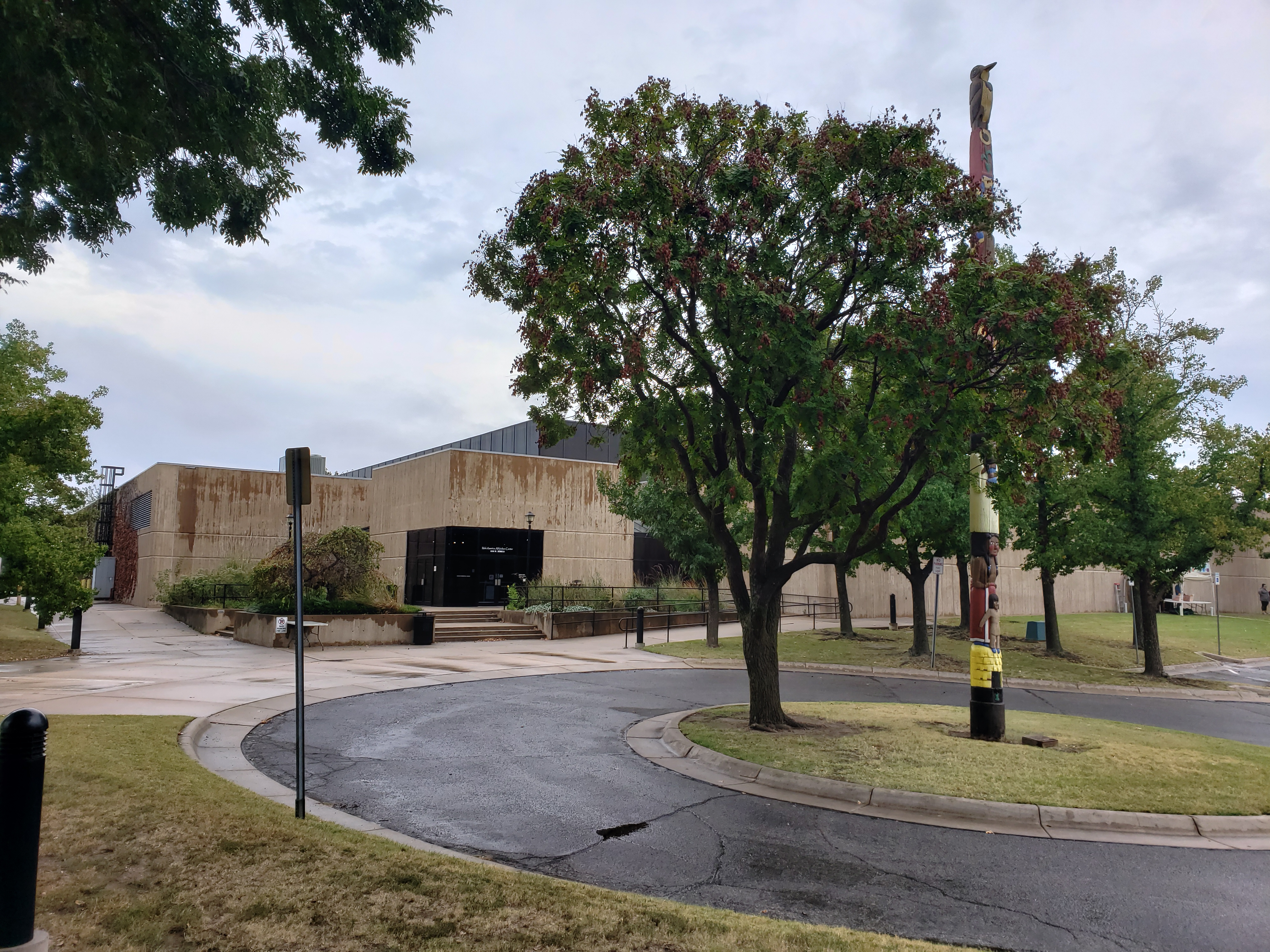
Mid-America All-Indian Center

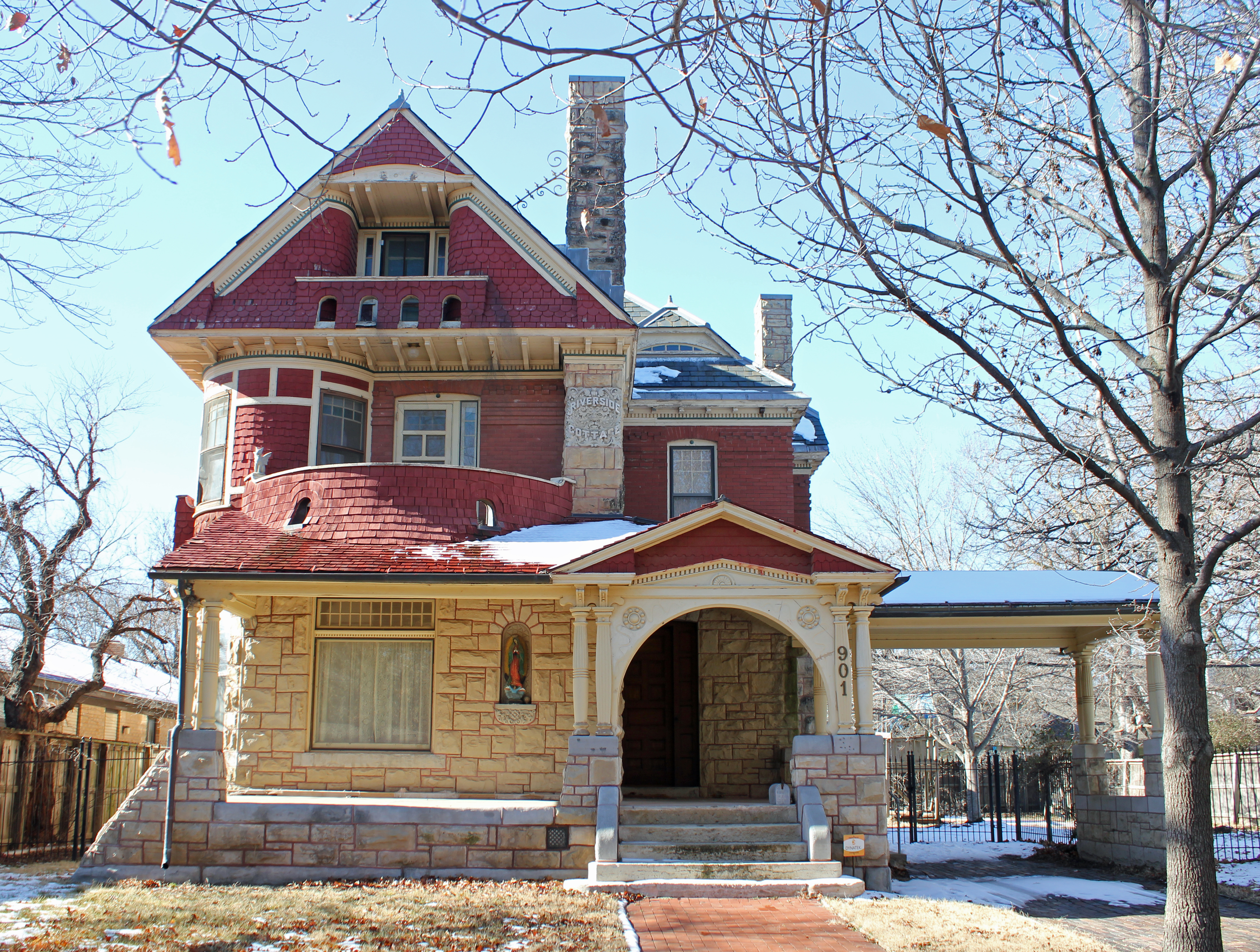
Riverside Cottage

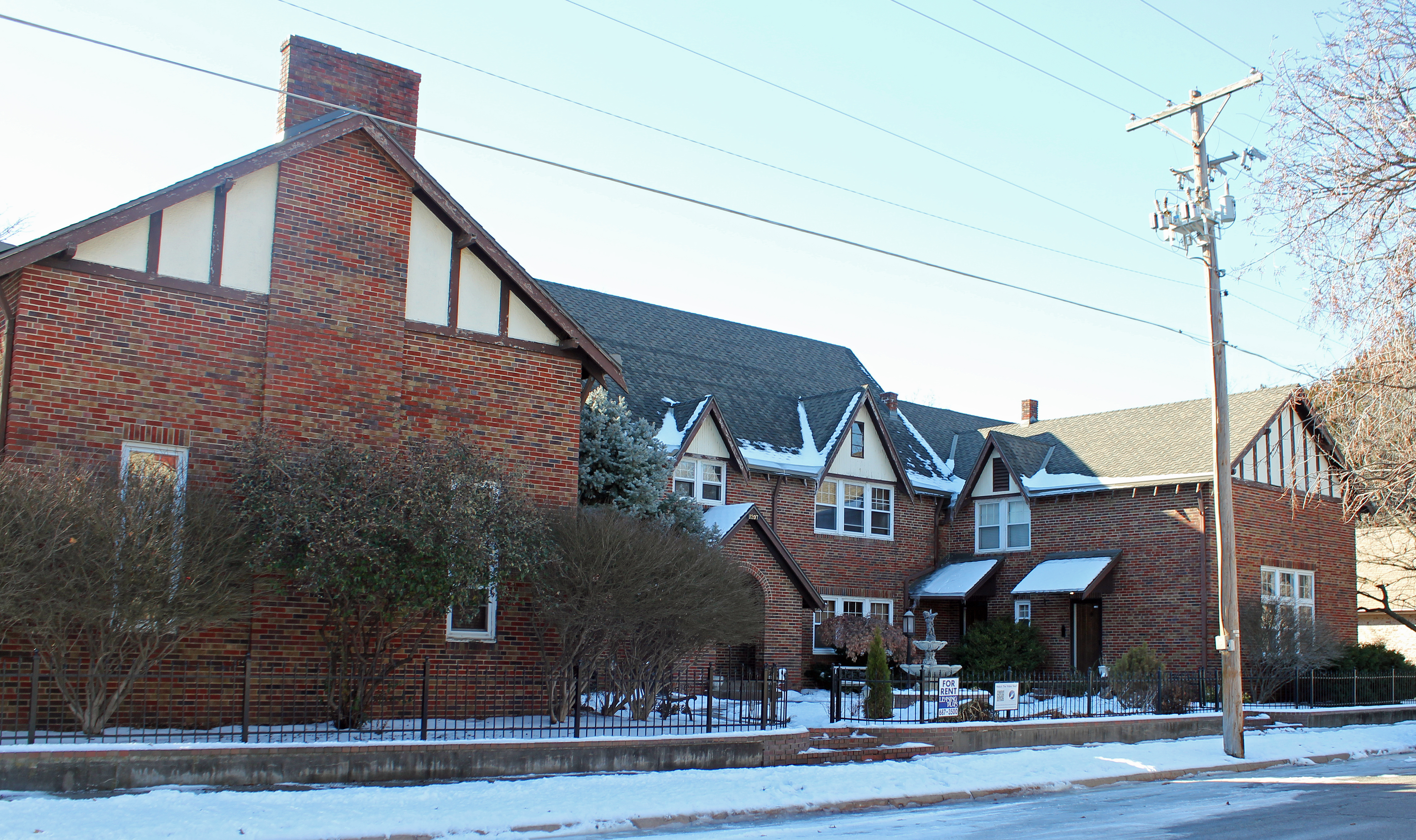
Stackman Court Apartments

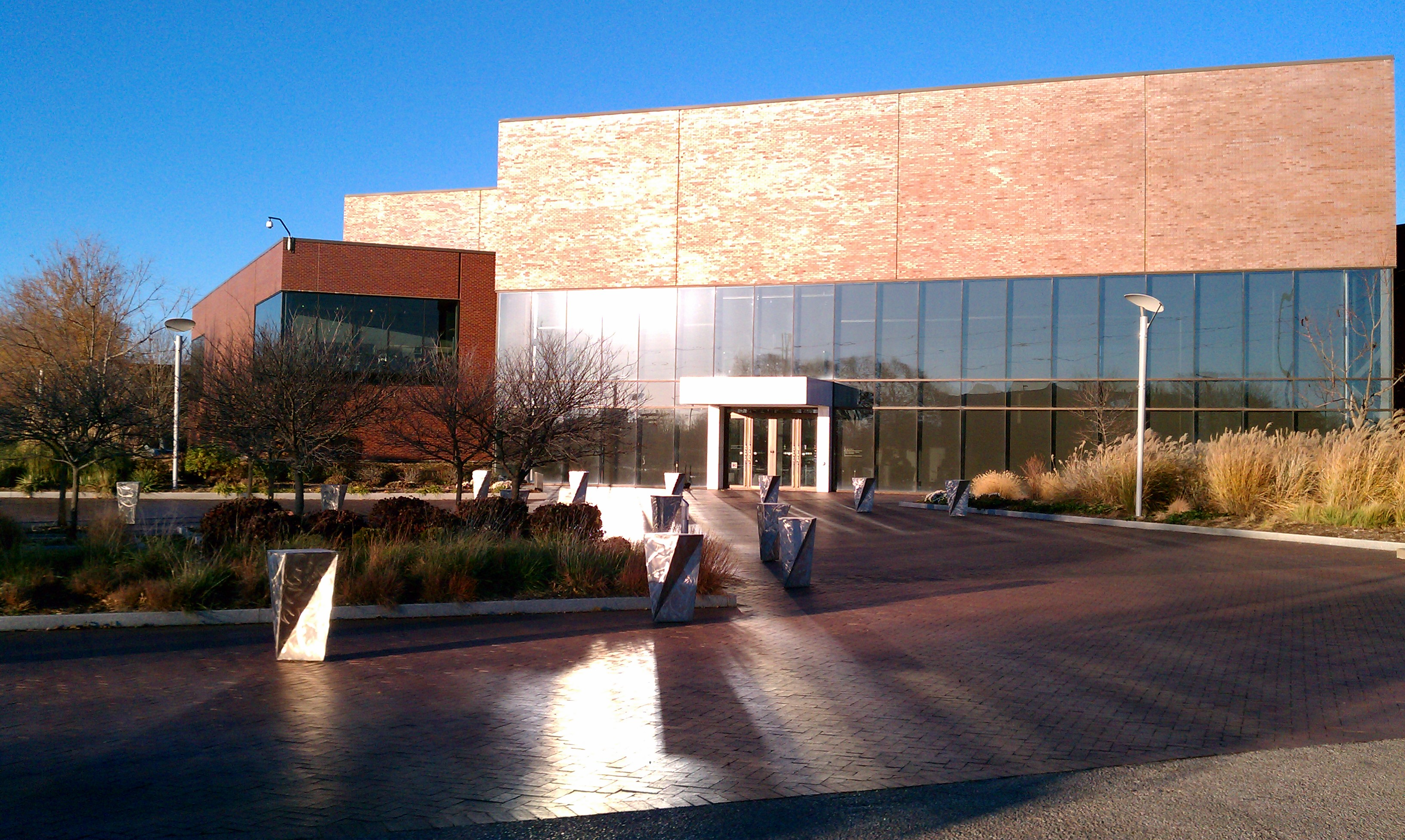
Wichita Art Museum
