= KCTU-LD =

Television station in Wichita, Kansas

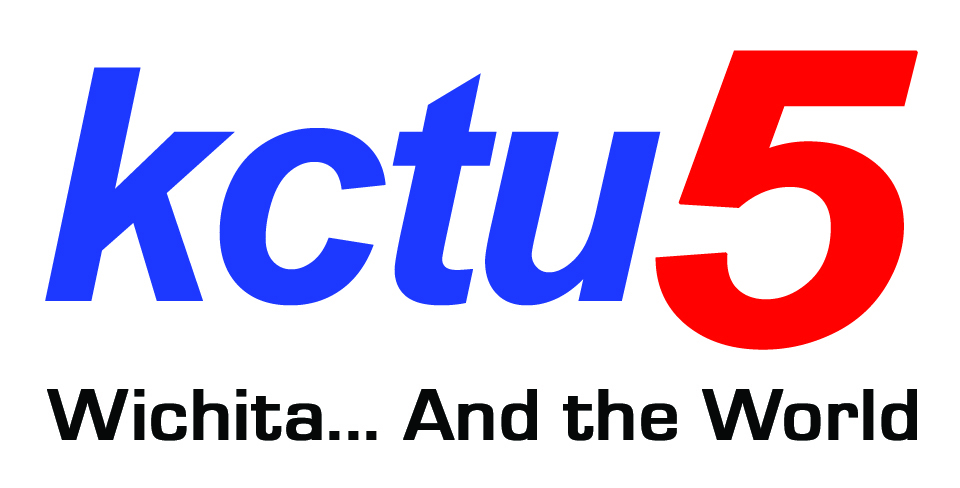
- Wichita, Kansas; United States
- Channels: Digital: 23 (UHF); Virtual: 5
- Branding: KCTU 5

Programming
- Affiliations: see § Subchannels

Ownership
- Owner: River City Broadcasters, Inc.

History
- Founded: June 7, 1990
- First air date: October 16, 1992
- Former call signs: K55FS (1992–1996); KCTU-LP (1996–2009)
- Former channel numbers: Analog: 55 (UHF, 1992–2003), 5 (VHF, 2003–2009); Digital: 43 (UHF, 2009–2018); Virtual: 43 (2009–2018)
- Former affiliations: Independent (1992–2001); Pax TV/i/Ion (2001–2008); This TV (2008–2024)

Technical information
- Licensing authority: FCC
- Facility ID: 56517
- Class: LD
- ERP: 2.7 kW
- HAAT: 71.9 m (236 ft)
- Transmitter coordinates: 37°41′13″N 97°20′24″W

Links
- Public license information: LMS
- Website: www.kctu-5.com

KCTU-LD (channel 5) is a low-power television station in Wichita, Kansas, United States. Owned by River City Broadcasters, Inc., the station is affiliated with several digital multicast networks. KCTU-LD's studios are located on Water Street in Wichita's Midtown neighborhood, and its transmitter is located atop 250 Douglas Place in downtown.

== History ==
The station first signed on the air in 1992. On February 1, 1998, KCTU became the first commercial television station in the world to stream its programming online 24 hours a day to reach more viewers. In 2001, KCTU affiliated with Pax TV (now Ion Television). Because of the local programming and other network affiliations carried by the station (including a secondary affiliation with Urban America Television that lasted until that network's shutdown in May 2006), the station did not air as many infomercials as most Pax/i/Ion affiliates. The station dropped the network in 2008.

On May 10, 2007, the principal owners of KCTU through N&H Publishing Corp. announced the acquisition of the Wichita City Paper. Planned topics are similar to those featured on the local programs seen on the station including local and consumer news, religious topics and veterans' issues. The local television program guide that was formerly featured as an insert in The Prospector, also began appearing in the City Paper.

In August 2010, the station became affiliated with Estrella TV, a Hispanic network. By June 2011, KCTU primary subchannel was picked up by AT&T U-verse.

Ron and Sheryl Nutt, owners, placed the station up for sale in July 2012 with a July 22 deadline for offers.

In late July 2013, TV Scout was added as the station's fourth subchannel with some initial formatting glitches.

== Cable carriage ==
KCTU logo as an ION affiliate; it also includes the logo from its Internet stream, KCTUiptv, used at the time.

As it is a low-power station, KCTU is not carried on Cox Communications as it is not obligated to carry KCTU under "must-carry" regulations as those rules do not currently apply to low-power stations. According to KCTU, the station presented the provider with a petition from 6,000 Cox subscribers and community leaders to carry the station. Cox refused to give KCTU channel space for free. According to KCTU, Cox increased their lease fee to $70,264 per month. This has led KCTU to encourage Cox subscribers to keep demanding that it carry the station, and to watch KCTU's programming over-the-air and on the internet. On June 28, 2011, AT&T U-verse began to carry KCTU on channel 43; the provider had previously carried all the Wichita–Hutchinson market's other low-power stations.

In December 2023, KCTU's channels were added to USA Connections' cable TV service in Wellington, south of Wichita. They occupy channels 400–409.

== Local programming ==
KCTU logo under "Local 5" branding from 2005 to 2009.

In addition to its various network programming, the station also produces some local public affairs programming, including the news and interview program Your Hour which airs weekdays at noon. A female-oriented talk show called Mouthy Broads airs Wednesdays at 6 p.m. The station also broadcasts a religious service from Wichita's Riverside Christian Church each Sunday at 9 a.m.

The station previously fielded a news department, headed for a number of years by R. J. Dickens and produced hour-long newscasts at 4 p.m. during the early 2000s. That program was reduced by a half-hour and aired at 4:30 between 2004 and 2005. The last regular news broadcast aired March 3, 2005, though news segments have appeared over the years, primarily as an insert during Your Hour. The news department also produced Spanish-language newscasts and updates for KSMI-LP during the time they were affiliated with Azteca América under River City ownership.

KCTU also had produced a program called The River City Forum with permanent hosts each weeknight and rotating fill-in hosts.

KCTU was nominated for a Heartland Emmy Award for Best Dayside Newscast in 2005, reportedly the first such nomination for an English-language low-power station in a Nielsen Top 160 market. The station received a second nomination in 2010 for news graphics.

Each holiday season, starting Thanksgiving night and running through Christmas Eve, the station airs the early 1980s-era version of Santa's Workshop—a long running Wichita TV program featuring Henry Harvey as Santa.

== Subchannels ==
The station's signal is multiplexed:

Subchannels of KCTU-LD
Subchannel	Res.	Short name	Programming
5.1	480i	RERUN T	NOST (4:3)
5.2	480i	GET TV	Great (4:3)
5.3	480i	POSITIV	Positiv (4:3)
5.4	480i	KCTUDT4	Religious Independent (4:3)
5.5	480i	Z LIV TV	Z Living (4:3)
5.6	480i	COUNTRY	The Country Network (4:3)
5.7	480i	RITENOW	Right Now TV (4:3)
5.8	480i	NEWSNET	[Blank] (4:3)
5.9	480i	INFOWAR	Infowars TV
5.10	480i	FRANCE2	France 24 (4:3)
