= Wichita Transit =

Bus system in Wichita, Kansas

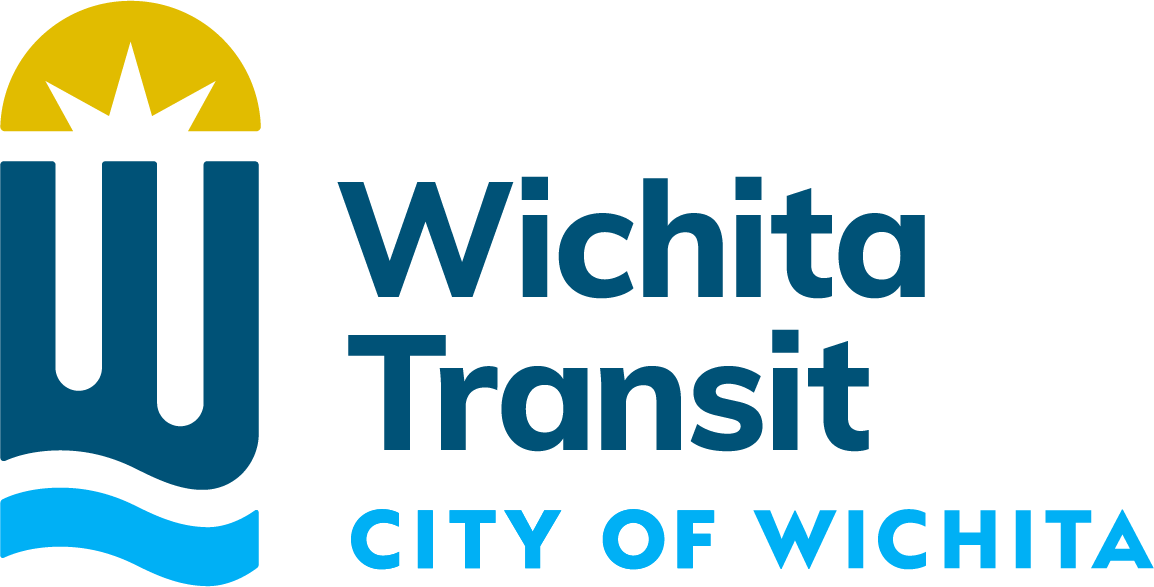

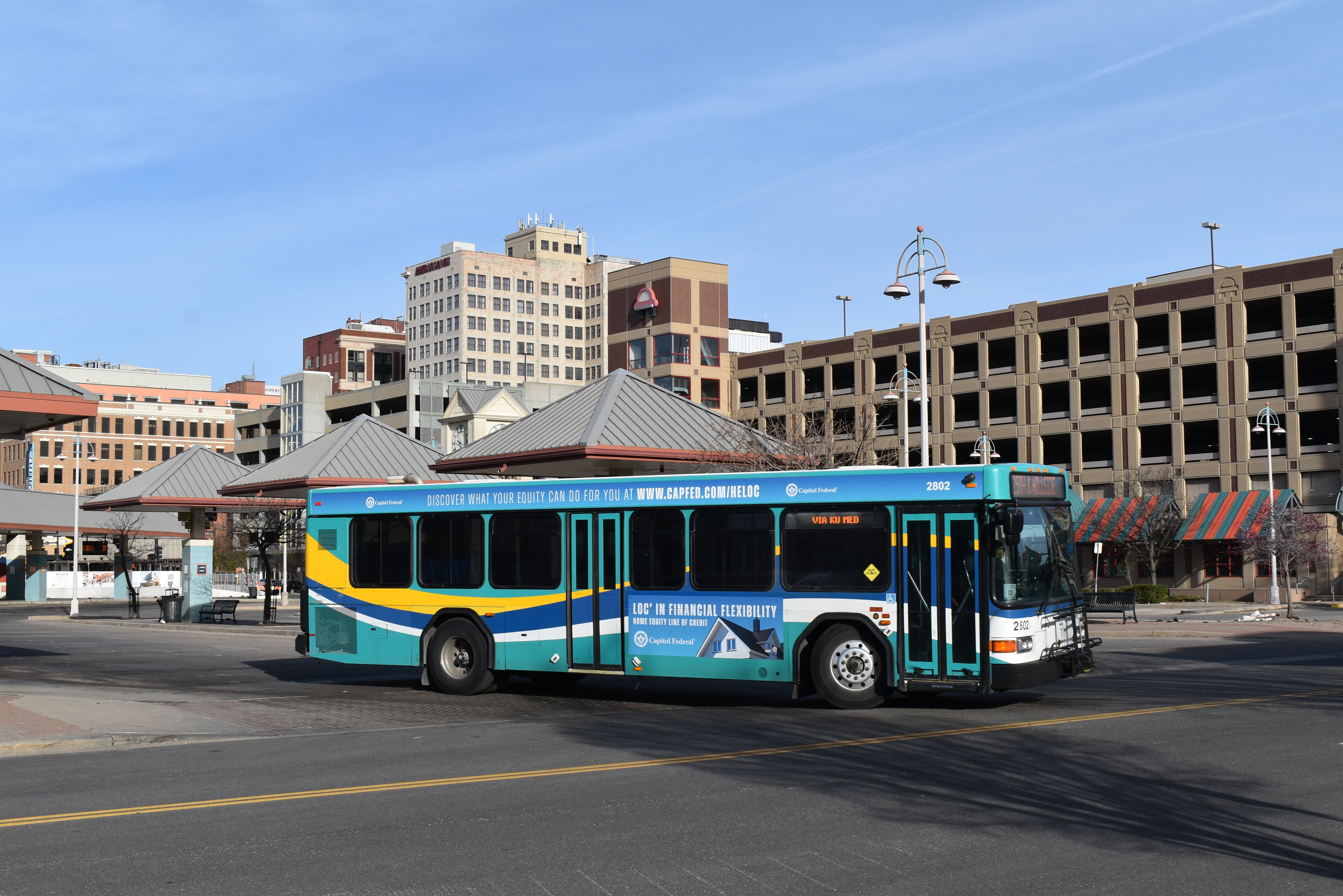
- Founded: 1890s 1962 (as Metropolitan Transit Authority); 1980s (as Wichita Transit)
- Headquarters: 777 E. Waterman St.
- Locale: Wichita, Kansas, U.S.
- Service type: Bus service, paratransit
- Routes: 17
- Fleet: 51 transit bus 26 accessible vans
- Daily ridership: 3,600 (weekdays, Q1 2026)
- Annual ridership: 1,163,400 (2025)
- Fuel type: Diesel; Electric
- Chief executive: Penny Feist
- Website: wichitatransit.org

Wichita Transit is the public transportation department of the City of Wichita that operates paratransit and transit bus services within Wichita, Kansas, United States. In 2025, the system had a ridership of 1,163,400, or about 3,600 per weekday as of the first quarter of 2026.

== History ==
Wichita Transit evolved out of a long history of mass transit in Wichita. Early buses were horse-drawn. By the late 1800s and early 1900s, the city had developed a trolley rail system connecting key commercial areas to the rest of the city. By the late 1920s, the system had switched to electric trolleys.

During the 1930s/1940s, the system shifted to conventional gasoline/diesel-powered buses, and reached its peak ridership during World War II, as the city became a hub of aircraft manufacturing for the war. Routes connected nearly all of the population of the city to workplaces and commercial centers. The 1944 Major Street Plan recorded over 77,000 daily passengers with buses traveling over 11,000 miles each day.

Following World War II and the early postwar years, in 1966, the city government took over transit—through its Metropolitan Transit Authority—to provide bus service to most of the city, chiefly through a "hub-and-spoke" system converging on downtown. The decline of downtowns, nationwide, was repeated in Wichita during the 1960s and 1970s, but the city retained its downtown hub system.

In the 1980s, and subsequently, the renamed Wichita Transit, has generally seen declines in ridership and capacity. The 1993 Wichita Comprehensive Plan recorded 22 weekday routes with buses traveling 6,378 miles. Since the turn of the century, the system has had a resurgence of interest, despite funding issues.

In 2016, Greyhound Lines closed its station and relocated to the Wichita Transit building. Greyhound Lines provides intercity bus service northeast to Topeka, Kansas and south to Oklahoma City, Oklahoma. BeeLine Express (subcontractor of Greyhound) provides daily bus service north towards Salina, Kansas and west towards Pueblo, Colorado.

Fares increased by 50 cents in 2011 and major changes to the route network took place in March 2016. The system introduced the first battery electric buses in Kansas on December 12, 2019. Route 200, which served Greenwich and Webb roads, was eliminated August 16, 2025.

== Services ==
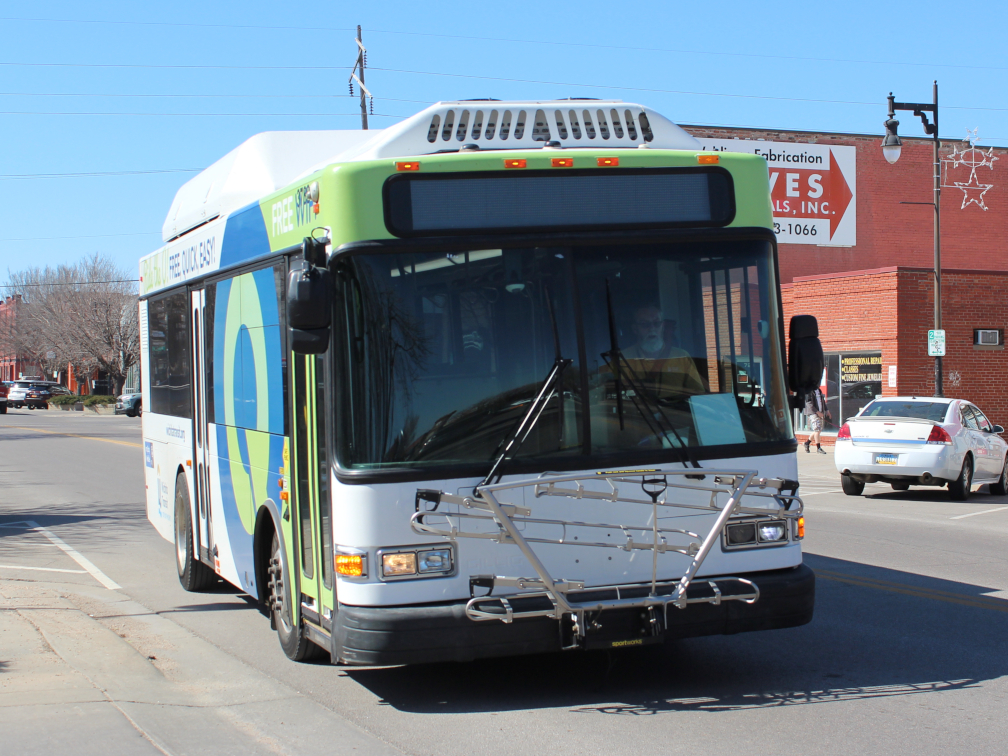
A Wichita Transit Q-Line electric bus.

Transit Services operate 17 fixed route bus lines and 17 demand-response paratransit routes. They report about two million yearly fixed-route trips and 320,800 yearly disabled paratransit trips.

Using a few replica trolleys, the city also operates the Q-Line shuttle service through downtown and adjoining areas, in conjunction with the Wichita Downtown Development Corporation (chiefly during recreational days/hours, typically evenings and weekends, and during major conventions downtown). In May 2021, the Q-Line replica trolleys were replaced by electric buses. City buses, including the imitation trolley cars, are sometimes available for charter.

== Transit center ==
Wichita's first transit center opened July 28, 1993 at the corner of William and Topeka. The style was described as a "psychedelic White Castle hamburger stand" and included a mural called "Kansas Daydreaming".

On October 11, 2024, the city broke ground on a new $26 million transit center named "The Hub" in the Delano neighborhood. Upon opening on June 6, 2026, the facility replaces the 1993 downtown transit center, which is intended to be redeveloped. The new facility features 12 bus bays, a 425-space parking garage, EV chargers, transit offices, and a ticket window and lobby. Alongside the opening of the transit center, the existing bus routes were realigned and a new service was begun on Pawnee Street.

== Recent issues and developments ==
Wichita's transit system is smaller in "revenue miles per capita" than comparable cities nationwide.

Like most transit systems, nationwide, Wichita Transit struggles continuously with financial difficulties. Rider fares do not bring in enough revenue to support the system, and it relies heavily on subsidies from the federal government and other entities.

=== Downtown redevelopment ===
In 2010–2012, consultants for the city, advising the city on its major push for downtown redevelopment, emphasized that major transit improvements were needed for effective downtown redevelopment and growth as envisioned by city plans and proposals.

=== KHI health assessment ===
In 2013, the non-profit Kansas Health Institute produced a "health impact assessment" ("HIA") on Wichita Transit, and its possible developments, a study and review, concluding that expanded hours and routes would have optimal impact on the health of the community's people.

Specifically, the KHI's researchers advised that a "grid" bus system (following major streets in straight lines) should replace the city's current "hub-and-spoke" system (routes radiating out from, and returning to, a downtown transit center), and advised that it should make more frequent stops, extend service after 6 p.m., and add Sunday service. They also recommended ways to maximize existing bus service. One was to allow bus passengers to carry more than two grocery sacks.

=== Funding and sales tax issues ===
Attempts by the city council to pass a one-cent sales tax by referendum—to fund transit along with selected other city programs and projects (water, jobs, etc.) – were overwhelmingly defeated in November 2014.

The current city council considered proposing a one-tenth of one cent ($0.001) sales tax committed exclusively to transit, and in June was expected to vote on it, in August 2015, as part of the city budget process.

In mid-July 2015, the city manager presented the 2016–2017 proposed city budget, which indicated that service reductions of $2 million (or 25%) would be required to ensure a balanced budget. The City Council, however, instructed staff to find solutions to close the funding gap for 2016. Discussed solutions involved $1.2 million in deferred road construction delayed from 2016 to 2017 (with scheduled 2017 bus replacements moved up to 2016), $500,000 in fuel savings through commitment to a fuel contract, and allocation of $300,000 from the city's permanent reserve fund (the city had $26.9 million in reserves as of July 2015).

Mayor Longwell, who had campaigned on transit improvements in the 2014 election, described the effort as "painful," but important, describing transit as "that critical to our community." The previously discussed sales tax increase (for transit) did not figure into the budget plan, however, and no increase to the property tax mill levy was projected in the city budget plan discussions during July 2015. (Public hearings were pending for Aug 4 and 11, the date that the city's 2016–2017 budget will be adopted.)

== Route list ==
- College Hill * E. 13th Street * E. 17th Street
- East Central * East Harry * E. Lincoln
- Meridian * N. Broadway * North Waco
- Rock Road * Riverside * S. Main * W. Maple
- S. Seneca * S. Broadway * West Central
- Westside Connector * Southside Connector

== Fleet ==
Wichita Transit maintains a fleet of 51 low-floor buses and 26 accessible vans.

All regular Wichita Transit buses are equipped free wi-fi and bike racks.

== Fixed route ridership ==
The ridership statistics shown here are of fixed route services only and do not include demand response services.

== See also ==
- Greyhound Lines
- Wichita Dwight D. Eisenhower National Airport

Historical

- Arkansas Valley Interurban Railway
- Kansas Aviation Museum
