= Sunnyside, Wichita, Kansas =

Sunnyside
- Neighborhood
- Lorraine Avenue Mennonite Church in Sunnyside (2026)
- Interactive map of Sunnyside
- Coordinates: 37°40′32″N 97°18′21″W
- Country: United States
- State: Kansas
- County: Sedgwick
- City: Wichita
- Elevation: 1,293 ft (394 m)

Population (2016)
  - Total: 1,509
- ZIP code: 67211
- Area code: 316

Sunnyside is a neighborhood in Wichita, Kansas, United States. A predominantly residential area, it is located in the east-central part of the city on the south side of U.S. Route 54.

== Geography ==
Sunnyside is located at 37°40′32″N 97°18′21″W (37.675556, -97.305833) at an elevation of 1,293 ft (394 m). It consists of the area between U.S. 54 in the north and Lincoln Street in the south and between Interstate 135 in the west and Hillside Street in the east. Sunnyside borders East Front to the north, College Hill to the northeast, Longview to the east, Schweiter East and Schweiter to the south, and The Hyde to the west. Linwood lies to the southwest.

== Government ==
For the purposes of representation on the Wichita City Council, Sunnyside is in Council District 1.

For the purposes of representation in the Kansas Legislature, Sunnyside is in the 25th district of the Kansas Senate and in the 86th district of the Kansas House of Representatives.

== Parks and recreation ==
The city’s Department of Park and Recreation maintains one park in Sunnyside: Grandparents Park. Occupying 0.56 acres (0.23 ha) at the corner of East Kellogg Drive and South Estelle Street, the park includes an exercise station, a playground, and a walking path.

== Transportation ==
Grove Street, which runs north-south, is the primary road through Sunnyside. Other arterial roads include Hillside Street, which runs north-south along the east side of the neighborhood, and Lincoln Street, which runs east-west along the south side. U.S. Route 54 runs east-west along the north side as the Kellogg Avenue freeway, accessible via interchanges at Grove and Hillside. Interstate 135 runs north-south along the west side, accessible via interchanges at U.S. 54 and Lincoln Street.

Wichita Transit offers bus service to Sunnyside on its 29 route.
