= The Hyde, Wichita, Kansas =

The Hyde
- Neighborhood
- Interactive map of The Hyde
- Coordinates: 37°40′47″N 97°19′19″W
- Country: United States
- State: Kansas
- County: Sedgwick
- City: Wichita
- Elevation: 1,295 ft (395 m)

Population (2016)
  - Total: 2,759
- ZIP code: 67202, 67211, 67214
- Area code: 316

The Hyde, also known as Kellogg School, is a neighborhood in Wichita, Kansas, United States. It is a mixed commercial and residential area immediately southeast of Downtown Wichita on the west side of Interstate 135.

== History ==
Inventor and businessman A. A. Hyde donated the land for Hyde Park in 1884. The area surrounding the park was platted as a residential neighborhood called Hydes Addition. Hyde went on to found Mentholatum in Wichita in 1889. In 1909, the company’s headquarters was built on East Douglas Avenue in the neighborhood. Several of the city’s historic buildings were constructed in The Hyde over the following decades including Willowdale, the mansion and estate of local farmer J. Hudson McKnight. The estate and several other properties were torn down in the 1960s to make way for apartment buildings and retail stores.

== Geography ==
The Hyde is located at 37°40′47″N 97°19′19″W (37.679722, -97.321944) at an elevation of 1,295 feet (395 m). It consists of the area between 1st Street in the north and Lincoln Street in the south and between Washington Avenue in the west and Interstate 135 in the east. The Hyde borders the New Salem neighborhood to the northeast, Sunnyside to the southeast, Linwood to the south, South Central to the southwest, and Downtown Wichita to the northwest; McAdams lies to the north.

== Government ==
For the purposes of representation on the Wichita City Council, The Hyde is in Council District 1.

For the purposes of representation in the Kansas Legislature, The Hyde is in the 25th and 29th districts of the Kansas Senate and in the 84th, 86th, and 103rd districts of the Kansas House of Representatives.

The 18th Judicial District Court's Juvenile Campus, including the Sedgwick County Juvenile Detention Facility, is located on East Morris Street in The Hyde.

== Media ==
Local television stations KAGW-CD and KSMI-LD broadcast from a facility on South Greenwood Street in The Hyde.

== Parks and recreation ==
The city government's Park and Recreation Department maintains three parks in The Hyde: Hyde Park, McKnight Parkway, and Skyline Park. Named for A. A. Hyde, Hyde Park is a 2.41-acre (0.98 ha) space with a community facility and a children's playground on South Greenwood Street. McKnight Parkway is a 4.49-acre (1.82 ha) landscaped area including hiking and biking trails on South Hydraulic Avenue. Skyline Park is a small, 0.42-acre (0.17 ha) neighborhood park with a playground.

== Culture ==
=== Points of interest ===
- Douglas Design District
- Wichita Children's Theatre

== Transportation ==
Douglas Avenue is the main east-west street in The Hyde; Washington is the primary north-south street. Other arterial roads include Lincoln Street, which runs east-west along the southern edge of the neighborhood, and Hydraulic Avenue, which runs north-south through the eastern part of the neighborhood. U.S. Route 54 runs east-west through The Hyde as the Kellogg Avenue freeway, accessible via an interchange at Washington. Interstate 135 runs north-south along the eastern edge of the neighborhood, accessible via interchanges at 1st Street, U.S. 54, and Lincoln Street.

Wichita Transit offers bus service in The Hyde on its 21, 24, 28, and 29 routes. The Douglas route of the free Q-Line trolley also services the neighborhood.

== Gallery ==
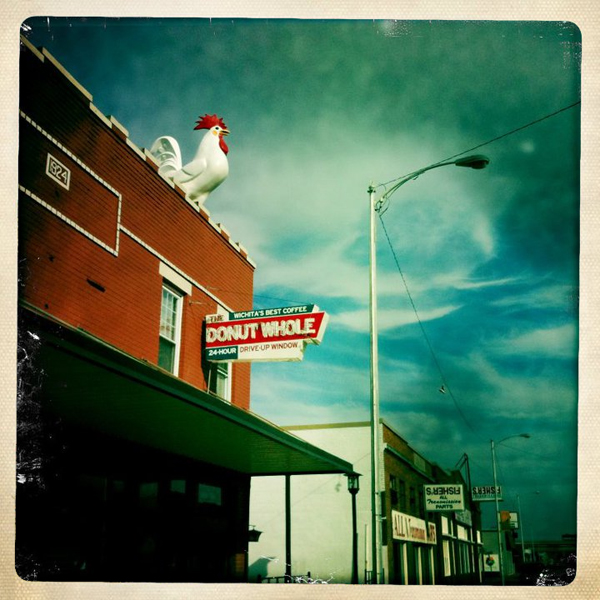
The Donut Whole restaurant (2010)

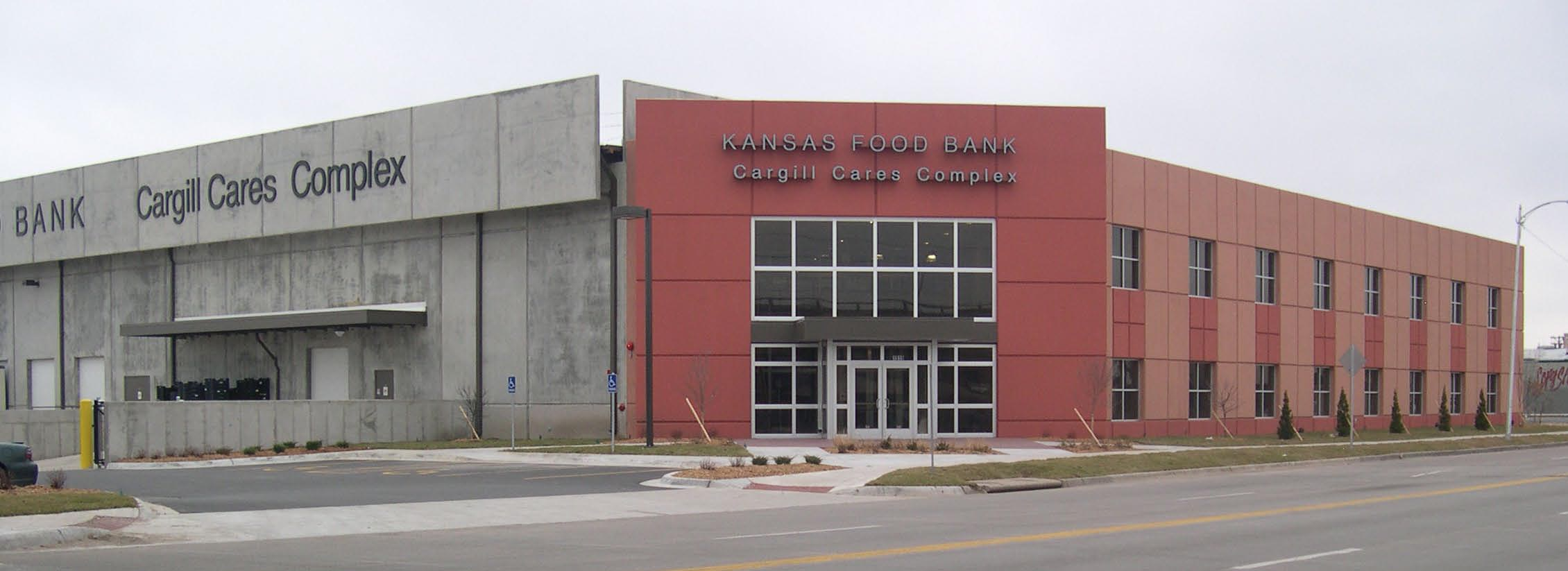
Kansas Food Bank (2006)

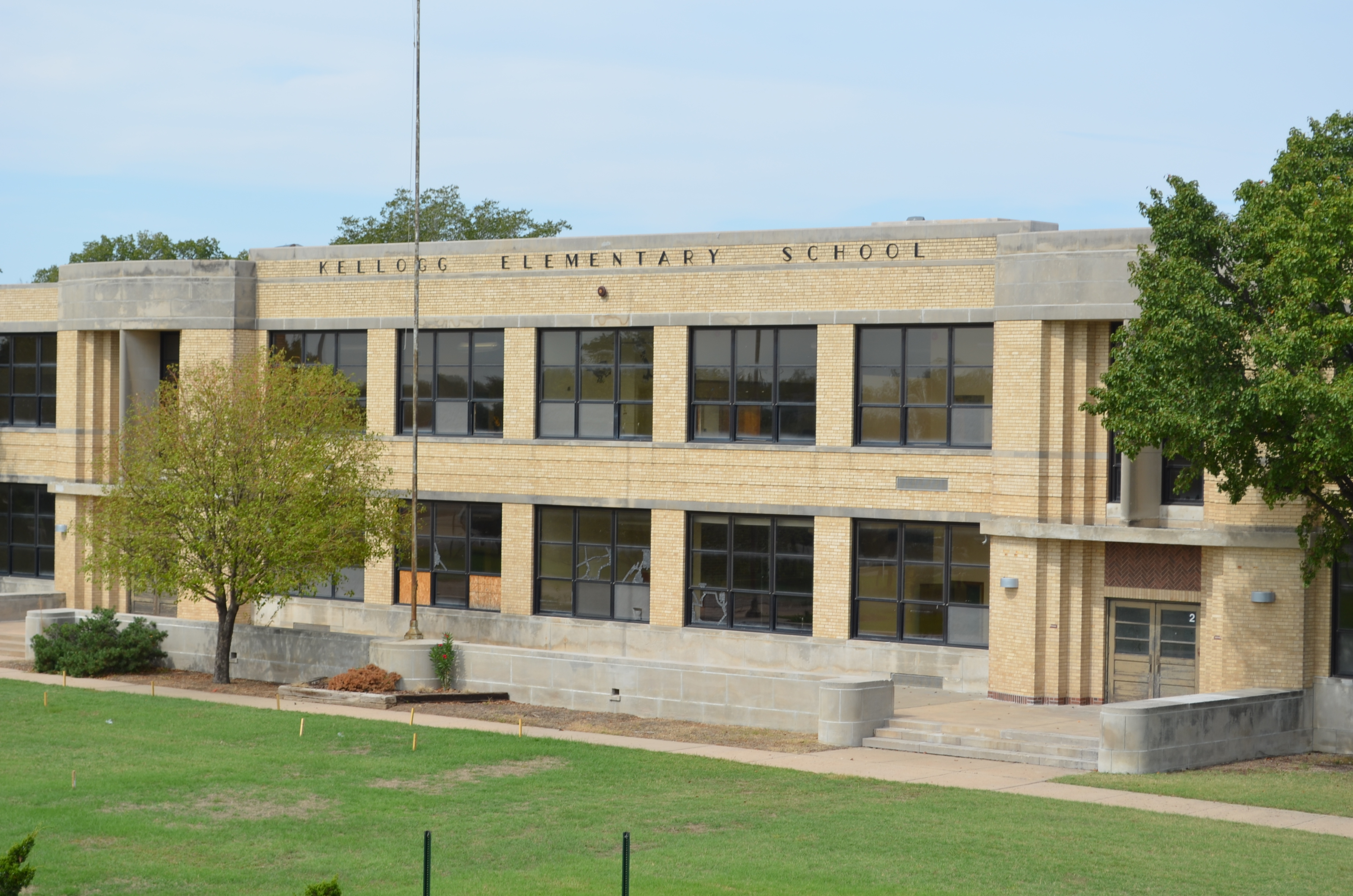
Kellogg Elementary School building (2012)

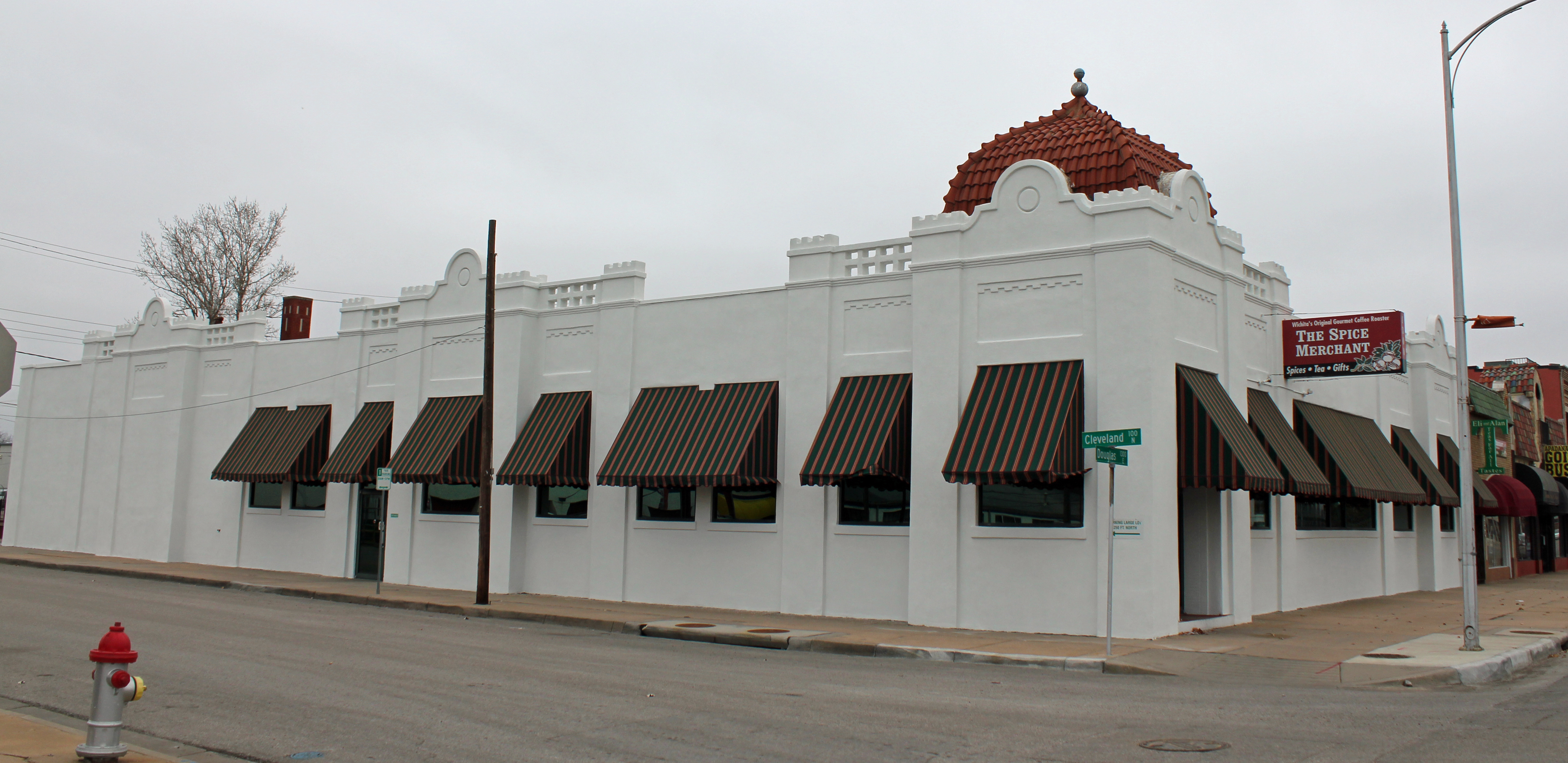
Mentholatum Building (2013)

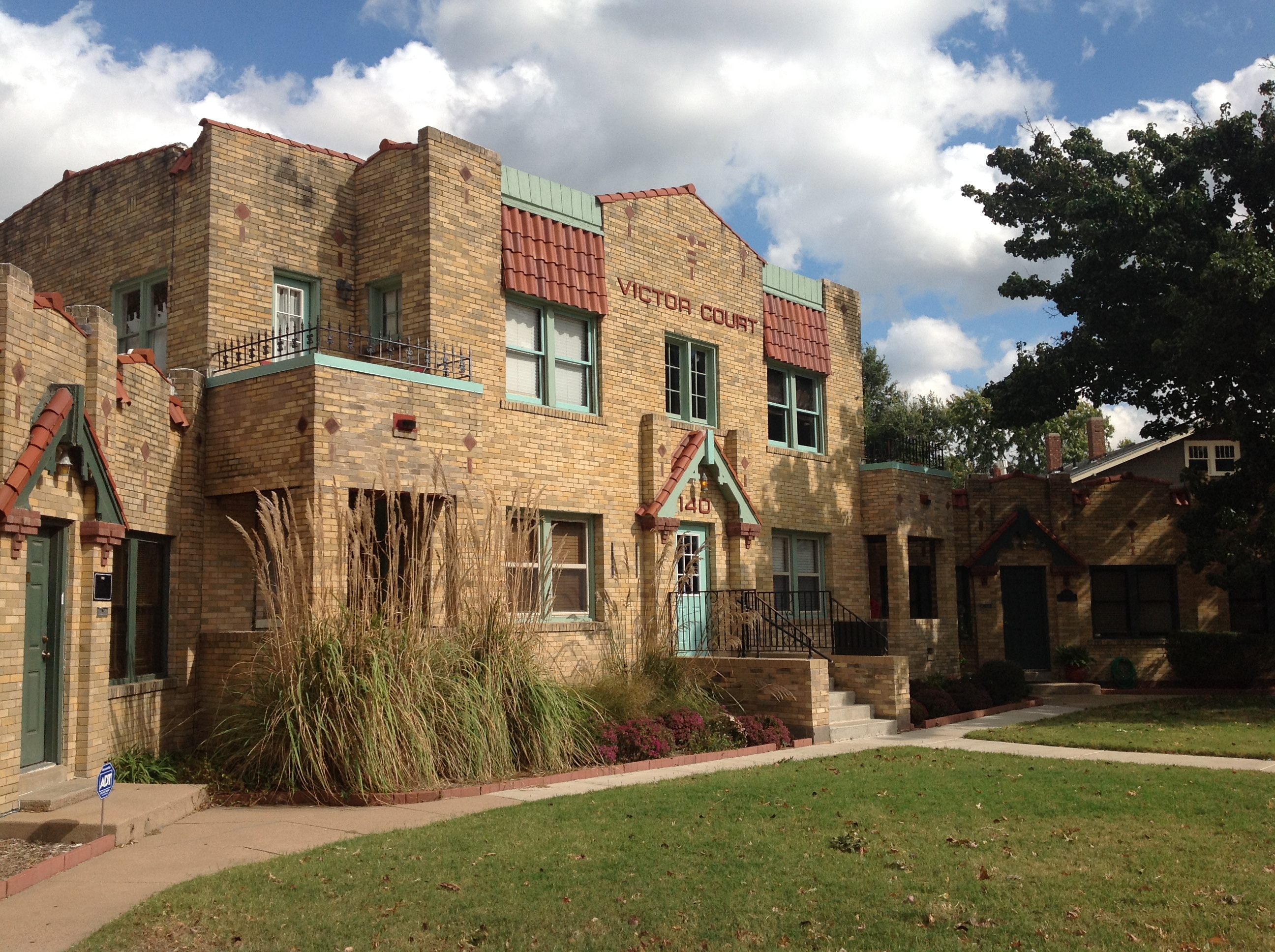
Victor Court Apartments (2015)
