= South City, Wichita, Kansas =

South City
- Neighborhood
- Interactive map of South City
- Coordinates: 37°38′15″N 97°19′19″W
- Country: United States
- State: Kansas
- County: Sedgwick
- City: Wichita
- Elevation: 1,281 ft (390 m)

Population (2016)
  - Total: 6,802
- ZIP code: 67211, 67216
- Area code: 316

South City is a neighborhood in Wichita, Kansas, United States. A mixed commercial, industrial, and residential area, it lies on the east bank of the Arkansas River in the south-central part of the city.

== Geography ==
South City is located at 37°38′15″N 97°19′19″W (37.6375, -97.321944) at an elevation of 1,281 ft (390 m). It consists of the area between the Arkansas River to the west and south, Pawnee Street to the north, and Southeast Boulevard and Chisholm Creek to the east. The confluence of Chisholm Creek and the Arkansas forms the southeast corner of the neighborhood. Part of South City overlaps with the South Central neighborhood to the north, specifically the area west of the Union Pacific Railroad tracks. South City borders the K-15 neighborhood to the east. South Area lies across the river to the south, and South Seneca and Southwest lie across the river to the southwest and west respectively.

== Economy ==
Pawnee Plaza, a neighborhood shopping center, is located in South City on the southeast corner of Pawnee and Broadway. Formerly the site of the 265,000 sq ft (24,600 m^{2}) Pawnee Plaza Mall, the 25-acre (10 ha) property now hosts a Walmart Supercenter and numerous small retailers.

The portion of the neighborhood east of Hydraulic Avenue and south of Northern Street is an industrial park consisting of light manufacturing and construction contractor facilities.

== Government ==
For the purposes of representation on the Wichita City Council, South City is in Council District 3.

For the purposes of representation in the Kansas Legislature, South City is located in the 28th district of the Kansas Senate and the 96th and 98th districts of the Kansas House of Representatives.

== Education ==
Wichita Public Schools operates three schools in South City:

- Anderson Elementary School
- Greiffenstein Alternate Elementary School
- Wells Alternative Middle School

The Roman Catholic Diocese of Wichita oversees one Catholic elementary school in the neighborhood: St. Margaret Mary School.

== Parks and recreation ==
Garvey Park spans 35 acres (14 ha) south of Galena Street on the east bank of the Arkansas River. It includes a canoe launch to the river, children’s playground, community garden, and the southern terminus of the 10-mile (16 km) Arkansas River Bicycle Path. 6.43-acre (2.60 ha) Leon Robinson Park is at the corner of Wassall Street and South Washington and includes two basketball courts, an exercise trail, and a playground. Both parks are maintained by the city’s Department of Park and Recreation.

== Transportation ==
Hydraulic Avenue is the main arterial road through South City, running north-south. Pawnee Street runs east-west along the north side of the neighborhood, and Southeast Boulevard runs northwest-southeast along the east side. Interstate 135 runs northeast-southwest through the southern part of the neighborhood, accessible via interchanges at Southeast Boulevard and Hydraulic.

Wichita Transit offers bus service in South City on its 14, 23, and 26 routes.

BNSF Railway and Union Pacific Railroad each operate a freight rail line which runs through the neighborhood. The BNSF line runs northwest-southeast parallel to Southeast Boulevard. The UP line runs generally north-south east of St. Francis Street in the western part of the neighborhood.
