= Dunbar Theatre (Kansas) =

NRHP movie theater in Wichita, Kansas

The Dunbar Theatre is a movie theater in Wichita, Kansas, United States. Opened in 1941, it was named after an American author Paul Laurence Dunbar. It is listed in the National Register of Historic Places since July 2, 2008, and the Kansas State Registry of Historic Places. It is located at 1007 N Cleveland St. in the McAdams Neighborhood, which is a historically African-American Neighborhood.

During the 1940s, the Dunbar Theatre was not only a destination for entertainment but also a center of the McAdams neighborhood, providing a welcoming place for African-Americans who faced segregation elsewhere in the city. Located at the intersection of 9th and Cleveland streets, the theatre was a central gathering place for locals to socialize and enjoy themselves. It became a symbol of not just a building but also a sense of community.

There is a plan to renovate the theatre and transform it into a cultural performing arts center, with expanded space for promotion of the arts and education.

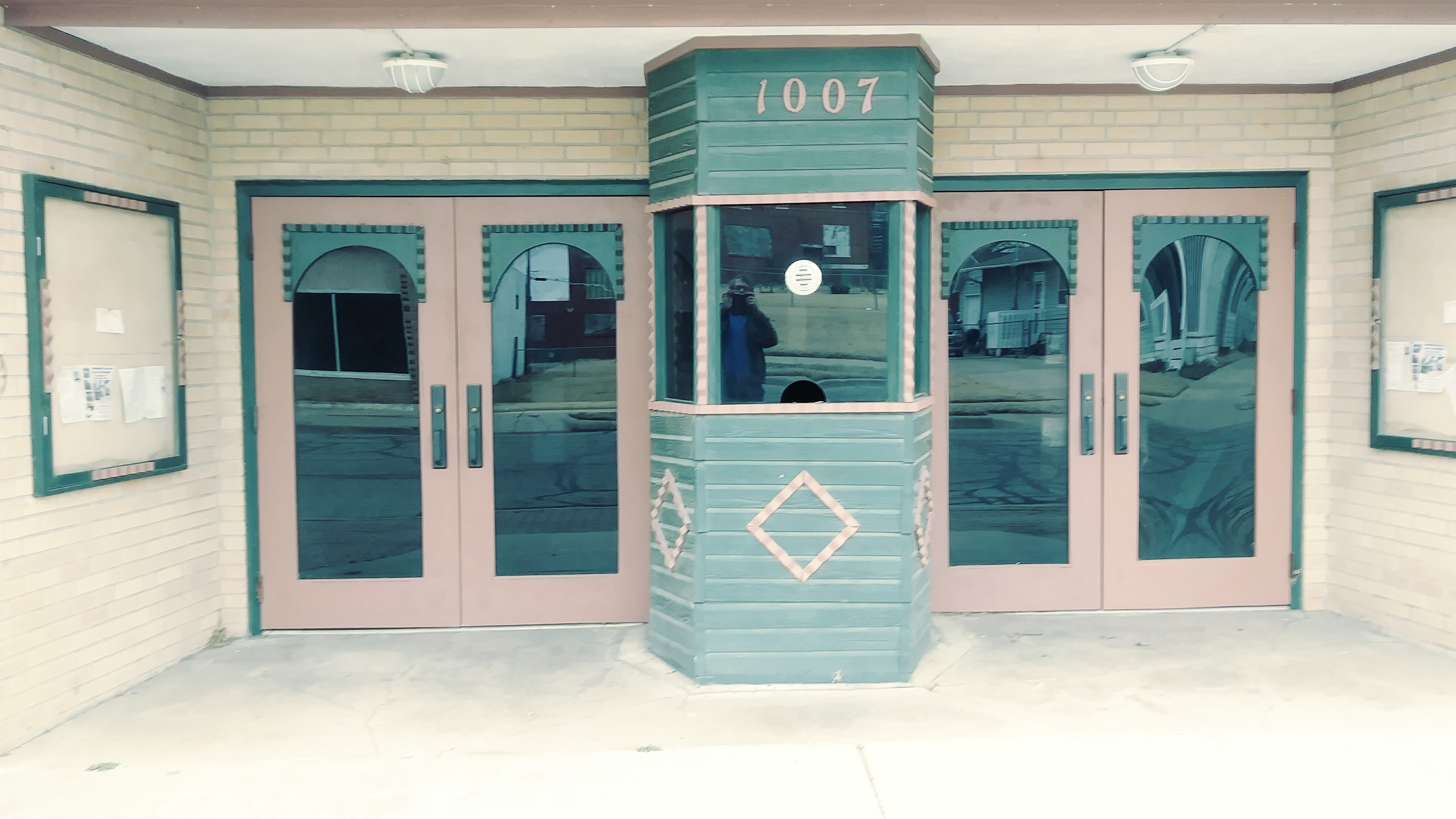
Dunbar Theatre entrance, January 2019

== History ==
=== Origin ===
The Dunbar Theatre opened on August 15, 1941, a time at which other theaters in the Wichita area did not serve African American patrons. It was designed by Raymond M. Harmon, and built specifically to serve the African American community.

=== Significance ===
The Dunbar was the hub of the neighborhood business and social community. The area was one of only a few where African Americans could freely do business and participate in cultural and social events in the Jim Crow era. In addition to films, the Dunbar hosted plays, pageants, and touring African American performers.

Wichitan Ferwilda Sears said, "The blacks didn't have a theater to go to, but the Dunbar was open to us." City Councilwoman Lavonta Williams, who represents the area said, “When we were kids, we were dropped off at that theater almost every Saturday.”

=== Decline ===
The Dunbar closed in 1963. The City of Wichita twice attempted to condemn and demolish the Dunbar in 1980 and 1991, 'but the historic site was saved through community action.

== Restoration ==
Restoration of the Dunbar is a project of the P.O.W.E.R. Community Development Corporation led by James Arbertha, Founding Executive Director, who hopes to reopen the Dunbar in 2020. Restoration of the sign and marquee took place from 2012-2014. The new Marquee was dedicated on December 14, 2012. The Wichita City Council approved funding more than $600,000 toward the renovation effort in November 2017. Once restored, the Dunbar will be a 340-seat theater with a concession area and restrooms.

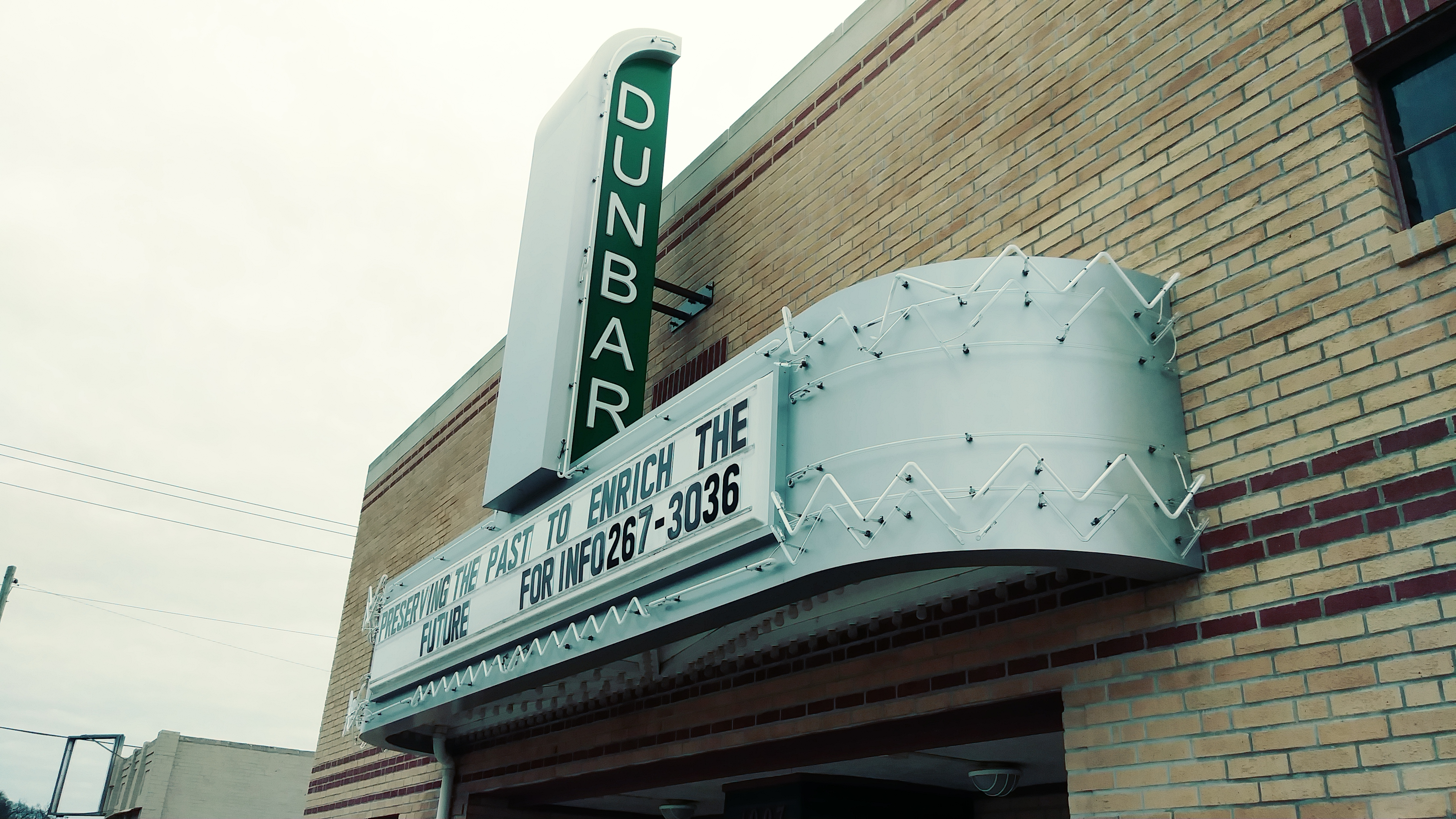
The restored Dunbar Theatre sign

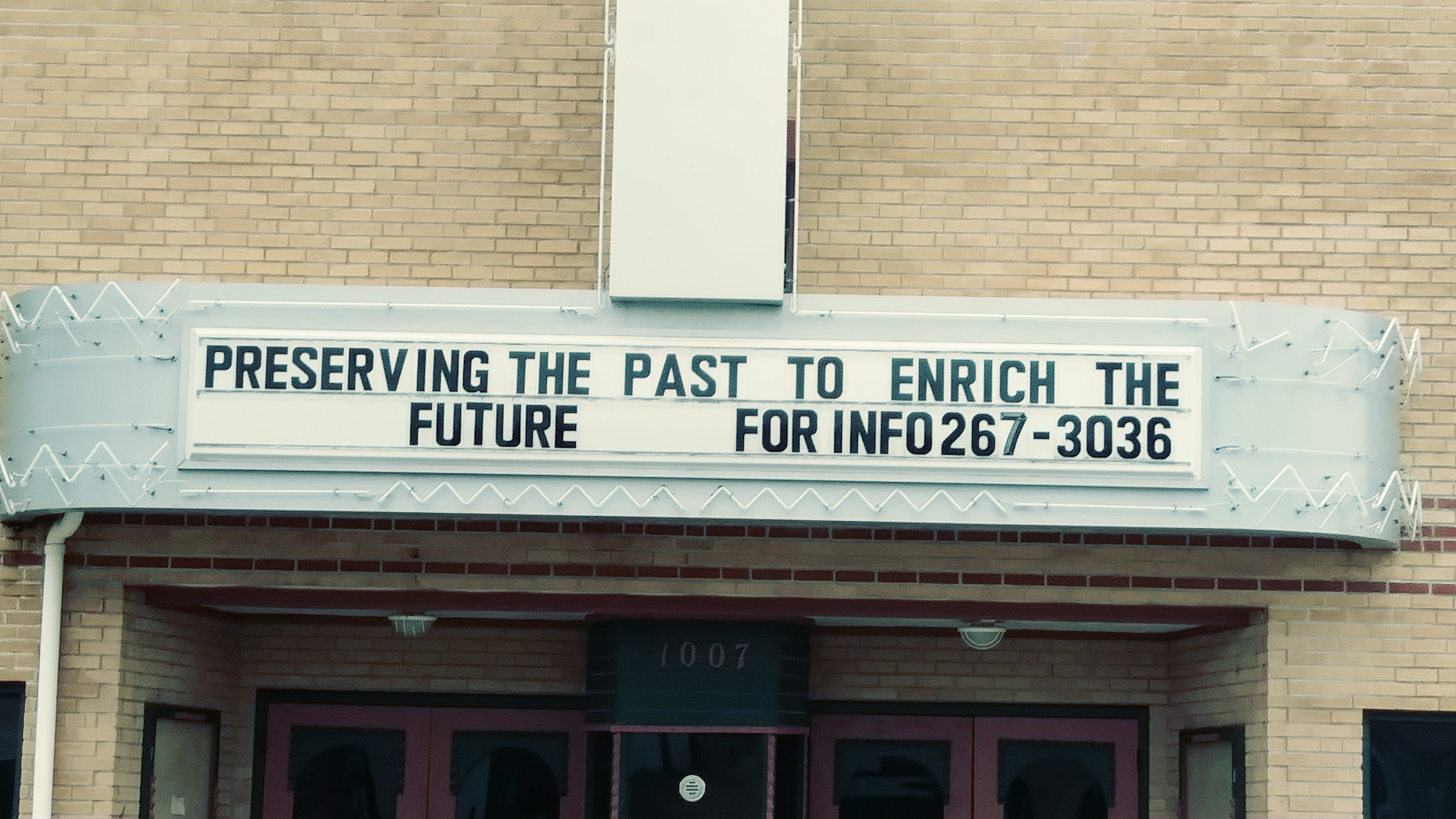
The restored Dunbar Theatre Marquee

After the existing theatre is restored, new construction will begin to add a black box theater, an arts center, educational facilities, a public gallery, and a bookstore. The restoration effort will also include the Turner Drug Store, which will be converted to a cafe.

=== Current use ===
Despite the theater not being ready for use, outdoor community activities take place on the property outside. Two of the more notable events were the August 25, 2017 End of Summer Bash, and the September 3, 2018 Melanin Fest, both fundraisers for the restoration efforts.
