= Stanley/Aley, Wichita, Kansas =

Stanley/Aley
- Neighborhood
- Interactive map of Stanley/Aley
- Coordinates: 37°39′58″N 97°22′14″W
- Country: United States
- State: Kansas
- County: Sedgwick
- City: Wichita
- Elevation: 1,296 ft (395 m)

Population (2016)
  - Total: 4,451
- ZIP code: 67213
- Area code: 316

Stanley/Aley is a mixed residential and industrial neighborhood in Wichita, Kansas, United States. It lies in the west-central part of the city on the south side of U.S. Route 54.

== Geography ==
Stanley/Aley is located at 37°39′58″N 97°22′14″W (37.666111, -97.370556) at an elevation of 1,296 ft (395 m). The neighborhood is L-shaped, wrapping around the west and south sides of neighboring McCormick. North of Harry Street, Stanley/Aley consists of the area between Southwest Boulevard in the west, Bonn Street in the east, and U.S. Route 54 in the north. It borders Delano to the northeast and Sunflower to the northwest. South of Harry Street, it consists of the area between Southwest Boulevard in the west, the Arkansas River in the east, and May Street in the south. South Central lies across the river to the east, Southwest lies to the south, and Southwest Village lies to the southwest.

== Government ==
For the purposes of representation on the Wichita City Council, Stanley/Aley is in Council District 4.

For the purposes of representation in the Kansas Legislature, Stanley/Aley is in the 25th district of the Kansas Senate and the 86th and 95th districts of the Kansas House of Representatives.

== Education ==
=== Primary and secondary education ===
Wichita Public Schools operates two facilities in Stanley/Aley:

- Payne Elementary School
- Stanley Elementary School

=== Colleges and universities ===
The main campus of Newman University, a private Catholic university, lies immediately west of the neighborhood on West McCormick Street.

== Parks and recreation ==
The city's Department of Park and Recreation maintains one park in the neighborhood: Aley Park. Spanning 18.9 acres (7.6 ha) adjacent to Stanley Elementary School on South Seneca, it includes a basketball court, playgrounds, a skatepark, a swimming pool, tennis courts, and volleyball courts.

== Transportation ==
Meridian Avenue, which runs north–south, is the primary road through Stanley/Aley. Other arterial roads include: McCormick Street, which runs east–west through the far northern part of the neighborhood; Southwest Boulevard, which runs northeast–southwest along the western edge of the neighborhood; Seneca Street, which runs north–south through the far eastern part of the neighborhood; and McLean Boulevard, which runs north–south along the west bank of the Arkansas River. U.S. Route 54 runs east–west as the Kellogg Avenue freeway along the far north side of the neighborhood, accessible via interchanges at Southwest Boulevard and Meridian.

Wichita Transit offers bus service in Stanley/Aley on its 14 and 16 routes.

Kansas and Oklahoma Railroad, which is based in a facility on West Harry Street in Stanley/Aley, operates two freight rail lines through the neighborhood. One line runs northeast–southwest, parallel to Southwest Boulevard. The other line enters the neighborhood from the northeast, parallel to Orient Boulevard, then turns northwest at Meridian Avenue.
