= Uptown, Wichita, Kansas =

Uptown
- Neighborhood
- Interactive map of Uptown
- Coordinates: 37°41′24″N 97°18′16″W
- Country: United States
- State: Kansas
- County: Sedgwick
- City: Wichita
- Elevation: 1,310 ft (400 m)

Population (2016)
  - Total: 1,478
- ZIP code: 67214
- Area code: 316

Uptown is a neighborhood in Wichita, Kansas, United States. A mixed commercial and residential area, it is located in the east-central part of the city.

== Geography ==
Uptown is located at 37°41′24″N 97°18′16″W (37.69, -97.304444) at an elevation of 1,310 ft (400 m). It consists of the area between Central Avenue in the north and Douglas Avenue in the south and between Grove Street in the west and Hillside Street in the east. Uptown borders The Elm neighborhood to the north, College Hill to the east, East Front to the south, and New Salem to the west.

== Government ==
For the purposes of representation on the Wichita City Council, Uptown is in Council District 1.

For the purposes of representation in the Kansas Legislature, Uptown is in the 29th district of the Kansas Senate and in the 84th district of the Kansas House of Representatives.

== Media ==
The offices of The Community Voice, a newspaper aimed at the local African American community, are located on East Douglas Avenue in Uptown.

== Parks and recreation ==
The City of Wichita’s Park and Recreation Department maintains one park in the neighborhood, Chautauqua Park. Converted to a 0.5-acre (0.20 ha) park from a house lot in 1999, it is on the 200 block of North Chautaqua Street just south of a bicycle/pedestrian path that runs from Lorraine to Interstate 135 several blocks west of Uptown. The park includes a children’s playground.

== Transportation ==
All the main streets in Uptown run along its periphery: Central Avenue, which runs east-west along its northern border; Hillside Street, which runs north-south along its eastern side; Grove Street, which runs north-south along its western side; and Douglas Avenue, which runs east-west along its southern border.

Wichita Transit offers bus service in Uptown on its 21, 24, and 25 routes. On Fridays and Saturdays, the Douglas route of the free Q-Line trolley also services the neighborhood.
