= Orchard Breeze, Wichita, Kansas =

Orchard Breeze
- Neighborhood
- Interactive map of Orchard Breeze
- Coordinates: 37°41′17″N 97°24′01″W
- Country: United States
- State: Kansas
- County: Sedgwick
- City: Wichita
- Elevation: 1,314 ft (401 m)

Population (2016)
  - Total: 3,333
- ZIP code: 67203, 67209, 67212
- Area code: 316

Orchard Breeze is a mixed residential and commercial neighborhood in Wichita, Kansas, United States. It lies in the west-central part of the city on the east side of Interstate 235.

== Geography ==
Orchard Breeze is located at 37°41′17″N 97°24′01″W (37.688056, -97.400278) at an elevation of 1,314 ft (401 m). It consists of the area between Central Avenue in the north and Maple Street in the south and between Interstate 235 in the west and West Street in the east. The Orchard Park neighborhood lies to the north, La Placita Park lies to the northeast, and Sunflower lies to the east.

== Economy ==
Towne West Square, one of the city's two super-regional shopping malls, is located immediately south of Orchard Breeze on the south side of Maple Street. The mall has more than 950,000 sq ft (88,000 m^{2}) of retail space, and, as of 2019, its anchor tenants include Convergys, Dick's Sporting Goods, Dillard's, and JCPenney. As of 2026, Towne West Square is closed, with only Dillards, J.c. Penney, and Boulevard Theaters still open to the public.

== Government ==
For the purposes of representation on the Wichita City Council, the portion of Orchard Breeze south of Douglas Avenue is in Council District 4, and the portion north of Douglas is in Council District 6.

For the purposes of representation in the Kansas Legislature, Orchard Breeze is in the 25th district of the Kansas Senate and the 95th and 105th districts of the Kansas House of Representatives.

== Education ==
Wichita Public Schools operates one school in Orchard Breeze: Dodge Literacy Magnet Elementary School.

The Roman Catholic Diocese of Wichita oversees one Catholic elementary school, Christ the King School, on West Maple Street immediately south of the neighborhood.

== Parks and recreation ==
The city's Department of Park and Recreation maintains one park in Orchard Breeze. Kiwanis Park occupies 6.77 acres (2.74 ha) at West 2nd Street and Doris Street. It includes a basketball court, children's playground, community facility, exercise trail, soccer field, softball diamond, and tennis courts.

== Transportation ==
The main arterial roads are those that form the neighborhood perimeter: Central Avenue, which runs east-west, along the north side; West Street, which runs north-south, along its east side; Maple Street, which runs east-west, along its south side. Interstate 235 runs generally north-south along the west side of the neighborhood and is accessible via an interchange at Central.

Wichita Transit offers bus service to Orchard Breeze on its 11, 12, and 15 routes.
