= Sunflower, Wichita, Kansas =

Sunflower
- Neighborhood
- Interactive map of Sunflower
- Coordinates: 37°41′12″N 97°22′53″W
- Country: United States
- State: Kansas
- County: Sedgwick
- City: Wichita
- Elevation: 1,305 ft (398 m)

Population (2016)
  - Total: 6,647
- ZIP code: 67203, 67213
- Area code: 316

Sunflower is a mixed residential and commercial neighborhood in Wichita, Kansas, United States. It lies in the west-central part of the city on the north side of U.S. Route 54.

== Geography ==
Sunflower is located at 37°41′12″N 97°22′53″W (37.686667, -97.381389) at an elevation of 1,305 ft (398 m). It consists of the area between West Street in the west and Meridian Avenue in the east and between Central Avenue in the north and U.S. Route 54 in the south. Sunflower borders the neighborhoods of La Placita Park and Indian Hills to the north, Delano to the east, Stanley/Aley to the south, Orchard Breeze to the west, and Orchard Park to the northwest.

== Government ==
For the purposes of representation on the Wichita City Council, the portion of Sunflower south of Douglas Avenue is in Council District 4, and the portion north of Douglas is in Council District 6.

For the purposes of representation in the Kansas Legislature, Sunflower is in the 25th district of the Kansas Senate and the 95th district of the Kansas House of Representatives.

== Education ==
Wichita Public Schools operates two facilities in Sunflower:

- Lawrence Elementary School
- Mayberry Cultural/Fine Arts Magnet Middle School

== Media ==
KSAS-TV, the Fox/MyNetworkTV television affiliate in Wichita, and KMTW, a Dabl affiliate licensed to Fellow city Hutchinson, Kansas, broadcast from studios on North West Street in Sunflower. Radio station KSGL, which plays a mixed Christian and Adult Standards format, broadcasts from studios on West Central Avenue in Sunflower.

== Parks and recreation ==
The city's Department of Park and Recreation maintains one park in Sunflower: West Douglas Park. The park consists of 16.77 acres (6.79 ha) and includes a concession stand, an open shelter, playgrounds, softball diamonds, and tennis courts.

== Transportation ==
Douglas Avenue and Maple Street, both of which run east–west, are the primary streets through Sunflower. Other arterial roads include: Central Avenue, which runs east–west along the north side of the neighborhood; Meridian Avenue, which runs north–south on the east side; and West Street, which runs north–south on the west side. U.S. Route 54 runs east–west as the Kellogg Avenue freeway along the south side of the neighborhood, accessible via interchanges at West Street, Edwards Street, and Meridian.

Wichita Transit offers bus service in Sunflower on its 11, 12, 14, and 15 routes.

Kansas and Oklahoma Railroad operates a freight rail line which runs northwest–southeast through the northeast corner of the neighborhood and northeast–southwest through the southeast corner of the neighborhood.
