= New Salem, Wichita, Kansas =

New Salem
- Neighborhood
- Businesses along the New Salem side of East Douglas Avenue (2026)
- Interactive map of New Salem
- Coordinates: 37°41′23″N 97°18′45″W
- Country: United States
- State: Kansas
- County: Sedgwick
- City: Wichita
- Elevation: 1,301 ft (397 m)

Population (2016)
  - Total: 949
- ZIP code: 67214
- Area code: 316

New Salem is a neighborhood in Wichita, Kansas, United States. A predominantly residential area, it is located in the east-central part of the city on the east side of Interstate 135.

== Geography ==
New Salem is located at 37°41′23″N 97°18′45″W (37.689722, -97.3125) at an elevation of 1,301 ft (397 m). It consists of the area between Central Avenue in the north and Douglas Avenue in the south and between Interstate 135 in the west and Grove Street in the east. New Salem borders The Elm neighborhood to the north, Uptown to the east, East Front to the southeast, The Hyde to the west, and McAdams to the northwest.

== Government ==
For the purposes of representation on the Wichita City Council, New Salem is in Council District 1.

For the purposes of representation in the Kansas Legislature, New Salem is in the 29th district of the Kansas Senate and in the 84th district of the Kansas House of Representatives.

== Education ==
The campus of Wichita East High School, part of Wichita Public Schools, is on East Douglas Avenue immediately south of New Salem.

== Parks and recreation ==
The City of Wichita’s Park and Recreation Department maintains one park in the neighborhood, Third and Piatt Park. Converted to a park from a segment of 3rd Street in 1999, it extends from I-135 in the west to Lorraine Street several blocks east of New Salem. The park includes a children’s playground and a trail.

== Transportation ==
1st Street, a one-way street going east, and 2nd Street, a one-way street going west, are the primary streets through New Salem. All other arterial roads run along the neighborhoods periphery: Central Avenue, which runs east-west along the north side; Grove Street, which runs north-south along the east side; Douglas Avenue, which runs east-west along the south side. Interstate 135 runs east-west along the west side of the neighborhood, accessible via interchanges at 1st Street, 2nd Street, and Central.

Wichita Transit offers bus service in New Salem on its 21, 24, and 25 routes. On Fridays and Saturdays, the Douglas route of the free Q-Line trolley also services the neighborhood.
