= Southwest Village, Wichita, Kansas =

Southwest Village
- Neighborhood
- Interactive map of Southwest Village
- Coordinates: 37°38′47″N 97°23′22″W
- Country: United States
- State: Kansas
- County: Sedgwick
- City: Wichita
- Elevation: 1,293 ft (394 m)

Population (2016)
  - Total: 5,597
- ZIP code: 67209, 67213, 67215, 67217
- Area code: 316

Southwest Village is a neighborhood in Wichita, Kansas, United States. A mixed commercial, industrial, and residential area, it lies east and north of the Interstate 235 bypass in the southwestern part of the city.

== Geography ==
Southwest Village is located at 37°38′47″N 97°23′22″W (37.646389, -97.389444) at an elevation of 1,293 ft (394 m). It consists of the area between Interstate 235 to the west and south, May Street to the north, and Meridian Avenue to the east. The Stanley/Aley neighborhood lies to the northeast and Southwest lies to the east.

== Economy ==
The northern and western parts of the neighborhood, particularly the corridor along West Street, consist of a mix of commercial retail, distribution, manufacturing, and other light industrial sites. Companies with facilities located in this area include Carrier Corporation, Frito-Lay, Heartland Coca-Cola Bottling Company, International Paper, Smithfield Foods, and UPS.

== Government ==
For the purposes of representation on the Wichita City Council, Southwest Village lies in Council District 4.

For the purposes of representation in the Kansas Legislature, Southwest Village is split between the 25th and 28th districts of the Kansas Senate and the 95th, 96th, and 97th districts of the Kansas House of Representatives.

== Education ==
=== Primary and secondary education ===
Wichita Public Schools operates one school in Southwest Village: Cleaveland Traditional Magnet Elementary School.

=== Colleges and universities ===
The main campus of Wichita Technical Institute, a two-year for-profit technical school, is located in Southwest Village at the junction of Jewell Street and South Meridian.

=== Libraries ===
The Alford Branch of the Wichita Public Library, the largest branch library in the city, is in Southwest Village on South Meridian.

== Parks and recreation ==
The city's Department of Park and Recreation maintains one park in Southwest Village. Wildwood Park occupies 9.91 acres (4.01 ha) on West 27th Street South and includes a basketball court, children’s playground, horseshoe courts, and a paved fitness trail.

== Transportation ==
West Street is the main north-south road through Southwest Village; Pawnee Street and 31st Street are the primary east-west roads. Another arterial road is Southwest Boulevard which runs northeast-southwest through the northern part of the neighborhood. The Interstate 235 freeway runs along the west and south sides of Southwest Village, accessible via interchanges at Southwest Boulevard, West Street, and Meridian.

Wichita Transit offers bus service to Southwest Village on its 14 route.

Westport Airport is a small airport on the south side of Pawnee Street in Southwest Village. Privately owned but open to the public, the airport is used for local and transient general aviation.

Kansas and Oklahoma Railroad operates one freight rail line through the neighborhood. North of 31st Street South, the line runs northeast-southwest; south of 31st Street, it runs north-south.
