= McAdams, Wichita, Kansas =

McAdams
- Neighborhood
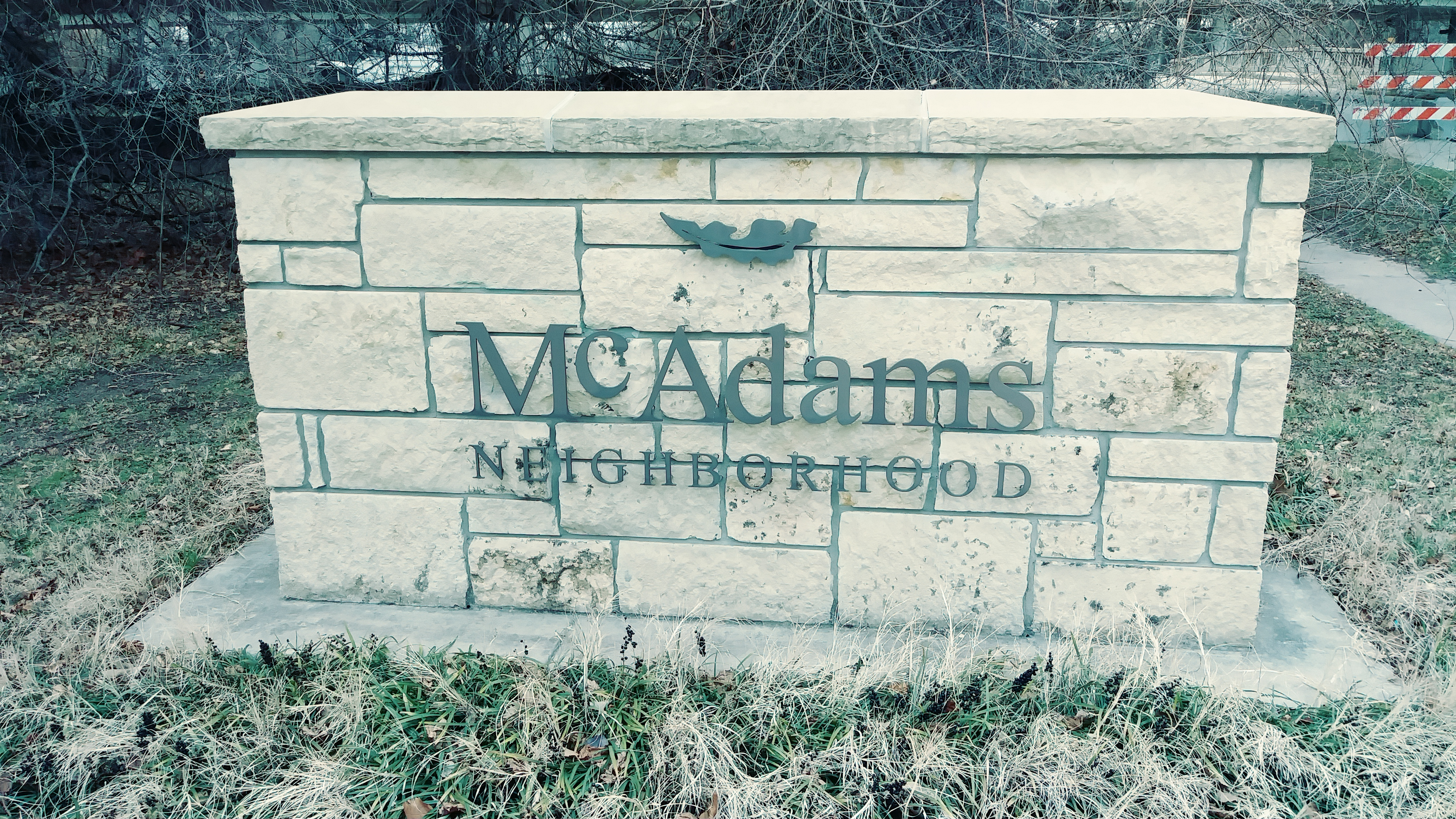
- McAdams neighborhood sign (2019)
- Interactive map of McAdams
- Coordinates: 37°42′17″N 97°19′24″W
- Country: United States
- State: Kansas
- County: Sedgwick
- City: Wichita
- Elevation: 1,304 ft (397 m)

Population (2016)
  - Total: 869
- ZIP code: 67214
- Area code: 316

McAdams is a neighborhood in Wichita, Kansas, United States. A mixed industrial and residential area northeast of Downtown Wichita, it is a historical center of the city's African American community.

== History ==
Despite prevalent racism and segregation in the early decades of Wichita history, an active African American community and business district developed northwest of the Old Sedgwick County Courthouse in what is today Midtown. Black men worked as construction workers, mechanics, railroad workers, and in the city's packinghouses. By the 1920s, the neighborhood supported multiple churches, public schools, and fraternal organizations. By the 1940s, the community had relocated several blocks northeast, specifically to the area north of Murdock Street and east of Washington Avenue i.e. present-day McAdams.

The intersection of 9th Street and Cleveland Street became the commercial hub of the local black community. By the late 1940s, it was the site of a grocery store, drug store, and the Dunbar Theater. Built in 1941, the theater was named after poet Paul Laurence Dunbar and, until 1963, the only theater available to the city's African Americans. Through the 1950s, it anchored a bustling area of retail stores, hair salons, and cafes. In 1966, the city renamed McKinley Park, located at the north end of the neighborhood, as McAdams Park after Emerson McAdams, a former city policeman and park director.

McAdams was home to the McAfee family, including nationally acclaimed African American architect Charles McAfee, after whom the McAfee city pool in Wichita is named, his brother Morehouse College Athletic Director Arthur "Sonny" McAfee, and his sister Gwendolyn McAfee who was head of the UCLA Hematology Lab in Los Angeles.

Over the following decades, the neighborhood was split by construction of the Interstate 135 freeway, with many businesses closing and residential housing falling into disrepair. In the early 1970s, the city government conducted generalized planning for urban renewal in McAdams, focusing on the industrial corridor that had developed along its western edge. In the early 2000s, community activists began working with the city government to reinvest in the neighborhood and improve quality of life, leading to the creation of formal revitalization plan in 2003.

== Geography ==
McAdams is located at 37°42′17″N 97°19′24″W (37.704722, -97.323333) at an elevation of 1,304 feet (397 m). 13th Street North forms its northern boundary, Hydraulic Avenue and Interstate 135 its eastern boundary, Central Avenue its southern boundary, and Mosley Street its western boundary. McAdams borders the Power neighborhood to the northeast; Minnesota Fats, Northeast Central, A. Price Woodard, and Murdock to the east; and New Salem to the southeast. The Hyde (also known as Kellogg School) lies to the south, Downtown Wichita to the southwest, and Midtown to the west.

== Government ==
For the purposes of representation on the Wichita City Council, most of McAdams lies within Council District 1. The small portion of the neighborhood west of Washington Avenue is in Council District 6.

For the purposes of representation in the Kansas Legislature, McAdams is located in the 29th district of the Kansas Senate and the 84th and 103rd districts of the Kansas House of Representatives.

== Education ==
Wichita Public Schools operates two facilities in the neighborhood:

- Dunbar Support Center
- L’Ouverture Technology Magnet Elementary School

== Parks and recreation ==
The city government's Park and Recreation Department manages two parks in the neighborhood: McAdams Park and Paul Laurence Dunbar Park. Occupying 57.46 acres (23.25 ha) west of Interstate 135 between 13th Street and 17th Street, McAdams Park includes an assembly area for performances, biking and hiking trails, baseball diamonds, basketball courts, a concession stand, a football field, a playground, a recreation center, a swimming pool, tennis courts, tetherball courts, and volleyball courts. Paul Laurence Dunbar Park, located at Indiana and 11th Street, is a small, 0.30-acre (0.12 ha) neighborhood park which includes a playground.

== Culture ==
During the 1940s, the Dunbar Theatre was not only a destination for entertainment but also a center of the McAdams neighborhood, providing a welcoming place for African-Americans who faced segregation elsewhere in the city. Located at the intersection of 9th and Cleveland streets, the theatre was a central gathering place for locals to socialize and enjoy themselves. It became a symbol of not just a building but also a sense of community.

The current plan is to renovate the theatre and transform it into a cultural performing arts center, catering to the needs of the community. There are plans to expand the Dunbar Theatre space into a community center that promotes the arts and education.

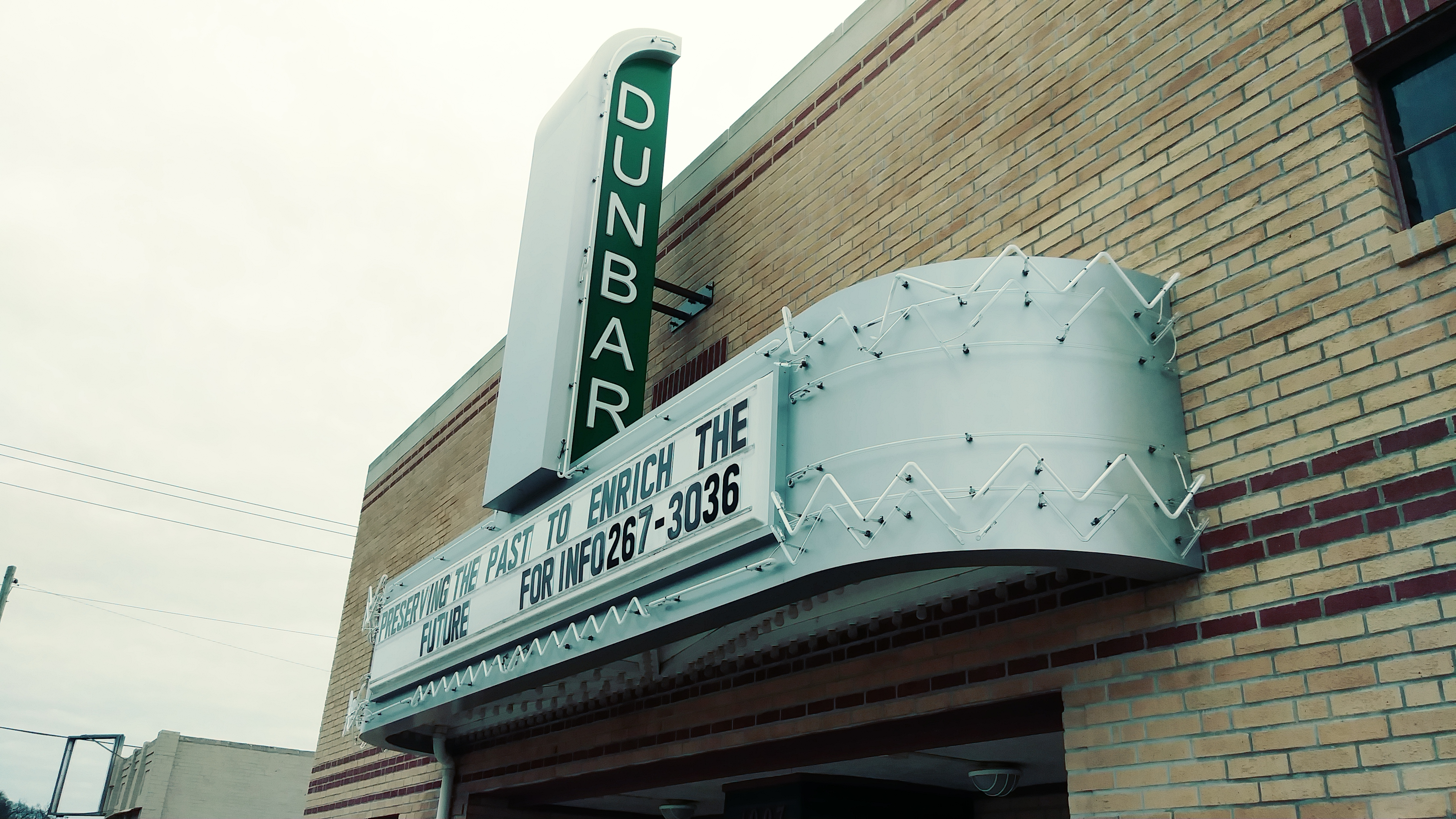
Dunbar Theatre (2019)

=== Points of interest ===
- Dunbar Theatre

== Transportation ==
Mosley is the main north–south street in McAdams. 13th Street and Murdock Street are the primary east–west streets. Other arterial roads include Central Avenue, which runs east–west along the southern edge of the neighborhood, and 17th Street, which runs east–west along the northern edge of the neighborhood. Interstate 135 runs generally north–south through the eastern part of the neighborhood, accessible via interchanges at Central, Murdock, and 13th Street.

Wichita Transit offers bus service in McAdams on its 25, 27, and 28 routes.

BNSF Railway and Union Pacific Railroad operate freight rail lines which run north–south two blocks west of McAdams, parallel to Mosley Street.
