= McCormick, Wichita, Kansas =

McCormick
- Neighborhood
- Interactive map of McCormick
- Coordinates: 37°40′21″N 97°21′16″W
- Country: United States
- State: Kansas
- County: Sedgwick
- City: Wichita
- Elevation: 1,297 ft (395 m)

Population (2016)
  - Total: 2,863
- ZIP code: 67213
- Area code: 316

McCormick is a mixed residential and industrial neighborhood in Wichita, Kansas, United States. It lies in the west-central part of the city on the south side of U.S. Route 54.

== Geography ==
McCormick is located at 37°40′21″N 97°21′16″W (37.6725, -97.354444) at an elevation of 1,297 ft (395 m). It consists of the area between Bonn Street in the west and the Arkansas River in the east and between U.S. Route 54 in the north and Harry Street in the south. McCormick borders the Delano neighborhood to the north, South Central across the river to the east, and Stanley/Aley to the south and west.

== Government ==
For the purposes of representation on the Wichita City Council, McCormick is in Council District 4.

For the purposes of representation in the Kansas Legislature, McCormick is in the 25th district of the Kansas Senate and the 95th district of the Kansas House of Representatives.

== Education ==
The campus of Wichita West High School, part of Wichita Public Schools, is located in McCormick on South Osage Street.

== Transportation ==
McCormick Street is the primary east–west road through the neighborhood; Seneca Street is the main north–south road. Other arterial roads include McLean Boulevard which runs north–south along the west bank of the Arkansas River. U.S. Route 54 runs east–west as the Kellogg Avenue freeway along the north side of the neighborhood, accessible via interchanges at Seneca and Sycamore Street.

Wichita Transit offers bus service in McCormick on its 16 route. Kansas and Oklahoma Railroad operates a freight rail line which runs east-southwest through southeastern McCormick.
