= College Hill, Wichita, Kansas =

Neighborhood in Wichita, Kansas

College Hill
- Neighborhood
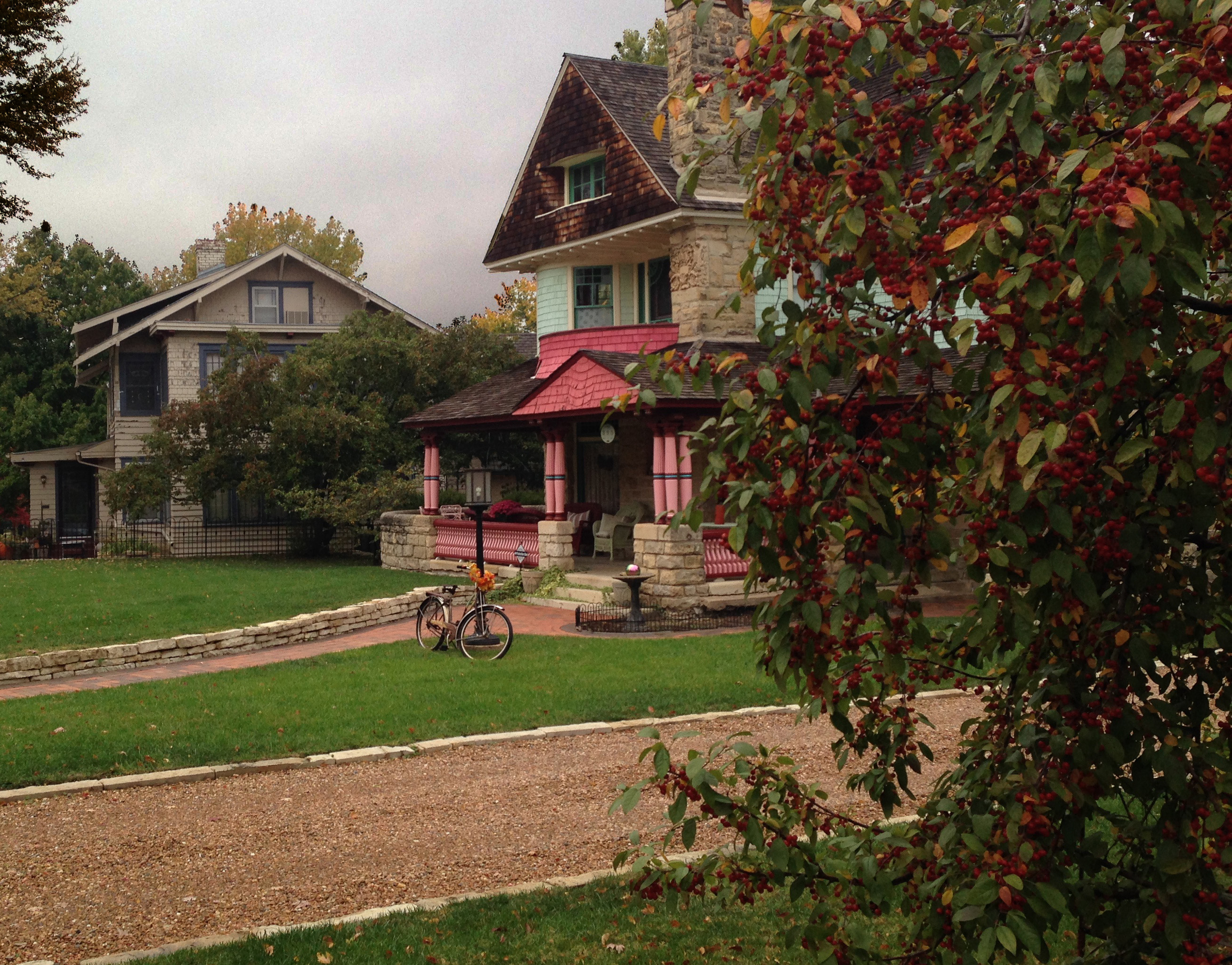
- The Aviary, 330 Circle Drive
- Interactive map of College Hill
- Coordinates: 37°41′13″N 97°17′22″W
- Country: United States
- State: Kansas
- County: Sedgwick
- City: Wichita
- Elevation: 1,360 ft (410 m)

Population (2016)
  - Total: 4,893
- ZIP code: 67208, 67211, 67214, 67218
- Area code: 316

College Hill is a historical, predominantly residential neighborhood in Wichita, Kansas, United States.

== History ==
College Hill was platted as a series of developments during a real estate speculation boom of the 1880s. The name came from a proposed Methodist college that would have been located in the neighborhood at Douglas and Rutan, but the Methodist church instead choose to build its college, today known as Southwestern College, in Winfield, Kansas. While a few houses in the neighborhood were built prior to the turn of the century, most were built between 1900 and 1934. In December 1926, the Lincoln Heights Addition between Douglas and Kellogg and Oliver and Crestway consisting of 73 acres and 250 lots was placed on the market. Construction of Lincoln Heights Shopping Center at Douglas and Oliver, begun in June 1948, was completed in July 1949.

== Geography ==
College Hill is located at 37°41′13″N 97°17′22″W (37.686944, -97.289444) at an elevation of 1,360 feet (410 m). It comprises the area between Central Avenue to the north and U.S. Route 54 to the south and between Hillside Street to the west and Oliver Avenue to the east. Located approximately 2.5 miles (4 km) east of Downtown Wichita, College Hill borders the neighborhoods of Sleepy Hollow and Country Overlook to the north, Crown Heights North and Crown Heights South to the east, Fairfax and Longview to the south, and East Front and Uptown to the west.

== College Hill Park ==
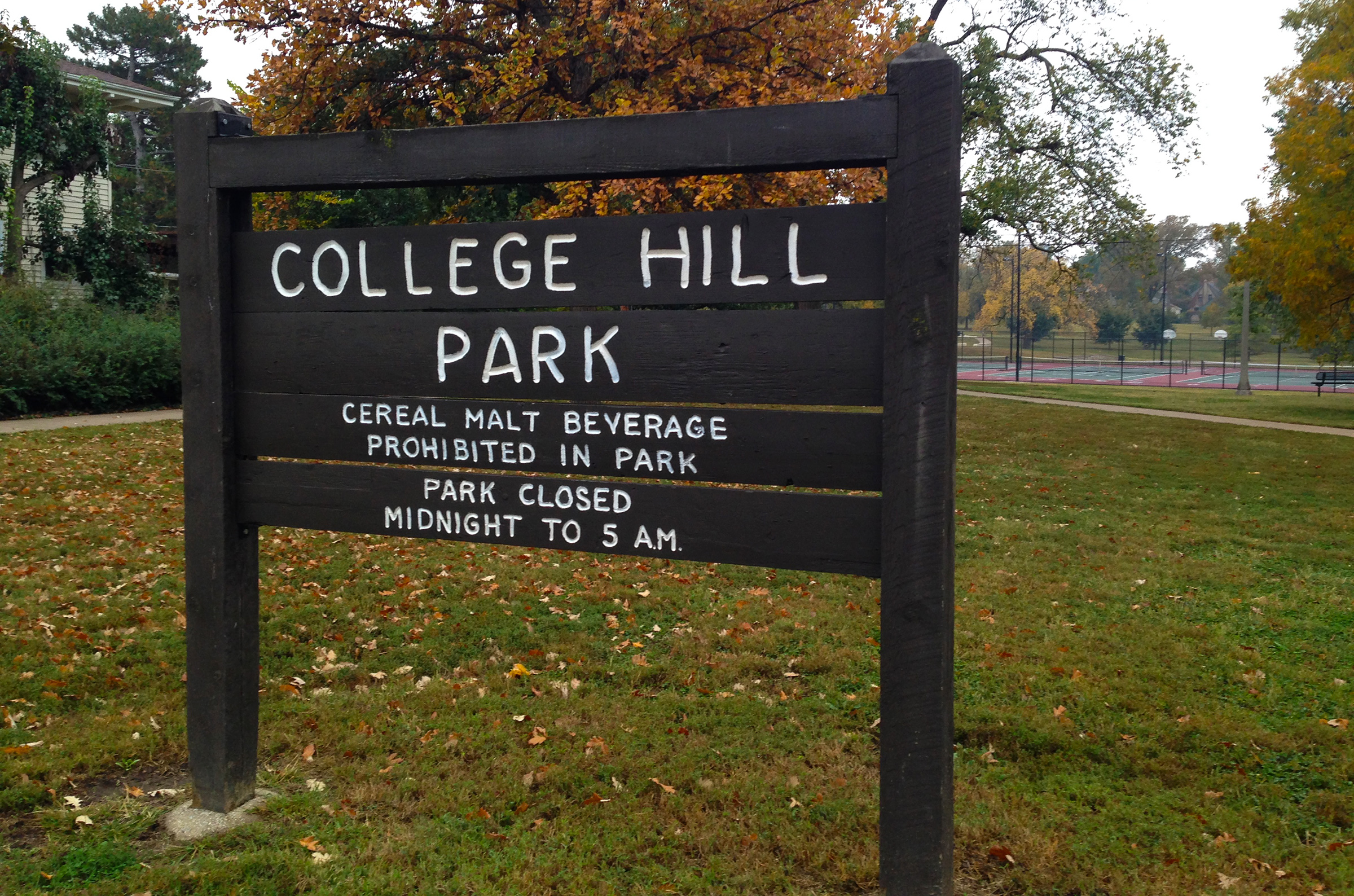
View from English Street

College Hill Park is managed by the Wichita Department of Park and Recreation. The city park spans 22 acres (8.9 ha) and is located on English and Circle Drive south of Douglas Avenue. Amenities include a basketball court, playground, shuffleboard courts, swimming pool, and tennis courts.

During Wichita’s real estate boom days of the 1880s, when the city was known as the "Peerless Princess of the Plains", mule-drawn streetcars traveled up and down Douglas Avenue taking residents to and from work and shopping. A college was planned for the area where the park now is, and plans changed. The area that is now College Hill Park served as the Wichita Country Club from 1901–1912. It was redeveloped from an overgrown golf course into its current park configuration, including its swimming pool, via WPA funds during the Great Depression.

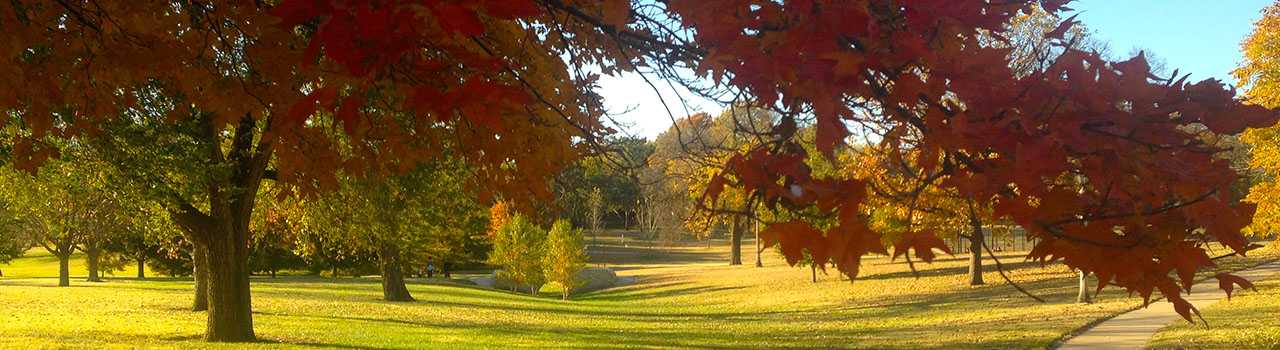
Panoramic view of College Hill Park from the east

== Government ==
For the purposes of representation on the Wichita City Council, College Hill lies within Council District 1.

For the purposes of representation in the Kansas Legislature, College Hill is located in the 29th district of the Kansas Senate, represented by Democrat Oletha Faust-Goudeau, and the 84th district of the Kansas House of Representatives, represented by Democrat Gail Finney.

== Education ==
Wichita Public Schools operates one school in the neighborhood: College Hill Elementary School. College Hill is part of the Wichita East High School and Robinson Middle School feeder systems.

The Roman Catholic Diocese of Wichita oversees one Catholic school in the neighborhood: Blessed Sacrament School.

== Culture ==
=== Points of interest ===
- Allen-Lambe House
- Clifton Square
- Crown Uptown Theatre
- Lincoln Heights Shopping Center
- Wichita Community Theatre
- The Aviary Home

== Transportation ==
Douglas Avenue is the main east-west street through College Hill. Other arterial roads include: Hillside Street, which runs north-south along the western edge of the neighborhood; Oliver Avenue, which runs north-south along the eastern edge of the neighborhood; and Central Avenue, which runs east-west along the northern edge of the neighborhood. U.S. Route 54 runs east-west immediately south of College Hill as the Kellogg Avenue freeway, accessible by interchanges at Hillside and Oliver.

Wichita Transit offers bus service in College Hill on its 21, 24, and 25 routes. On Fridays and Saturdays, the Douglas route of the free Q-Line trolley also services the neighborhood.

== Gallery ==
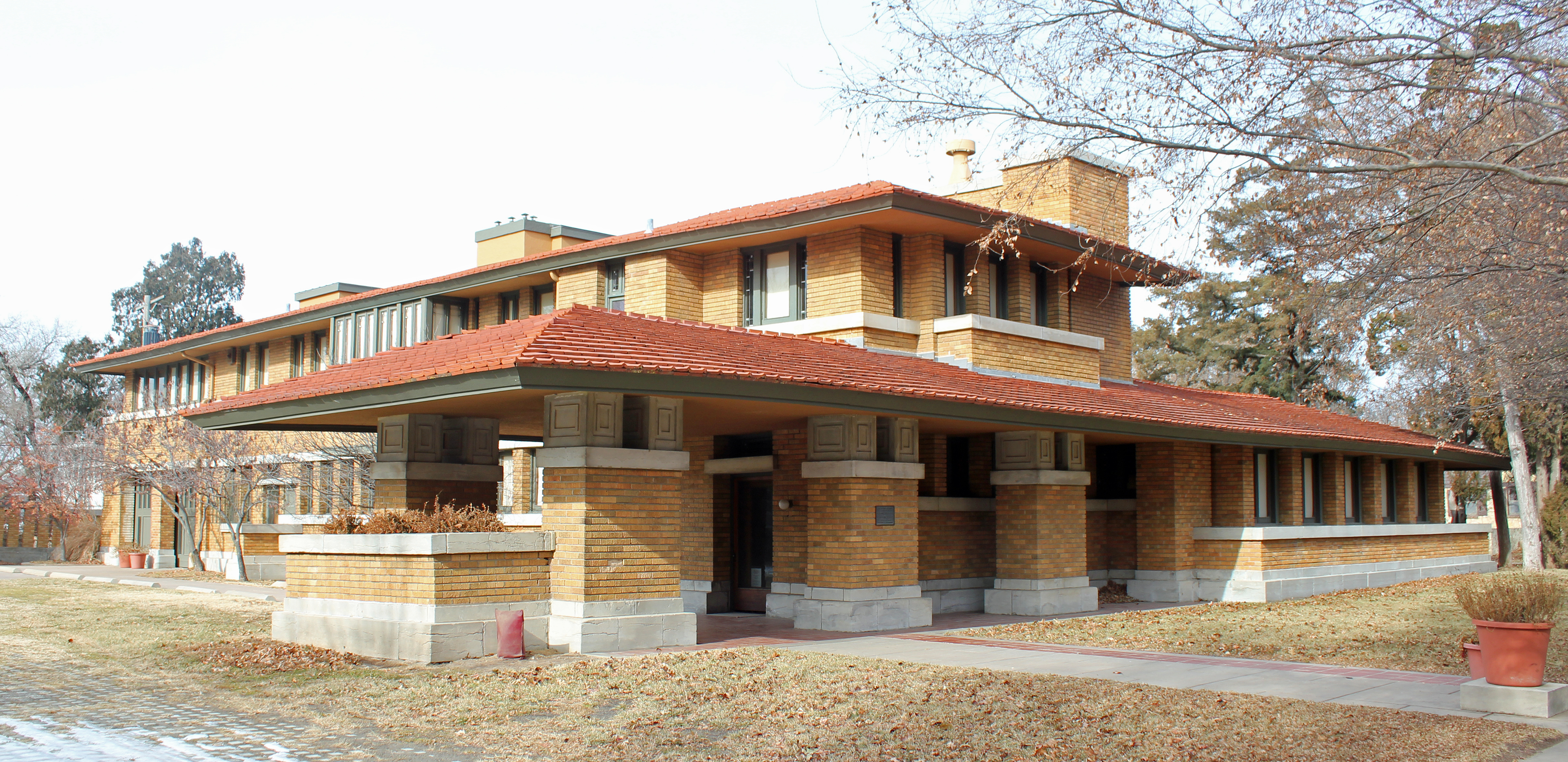
The Allen-Lambe House (2013)

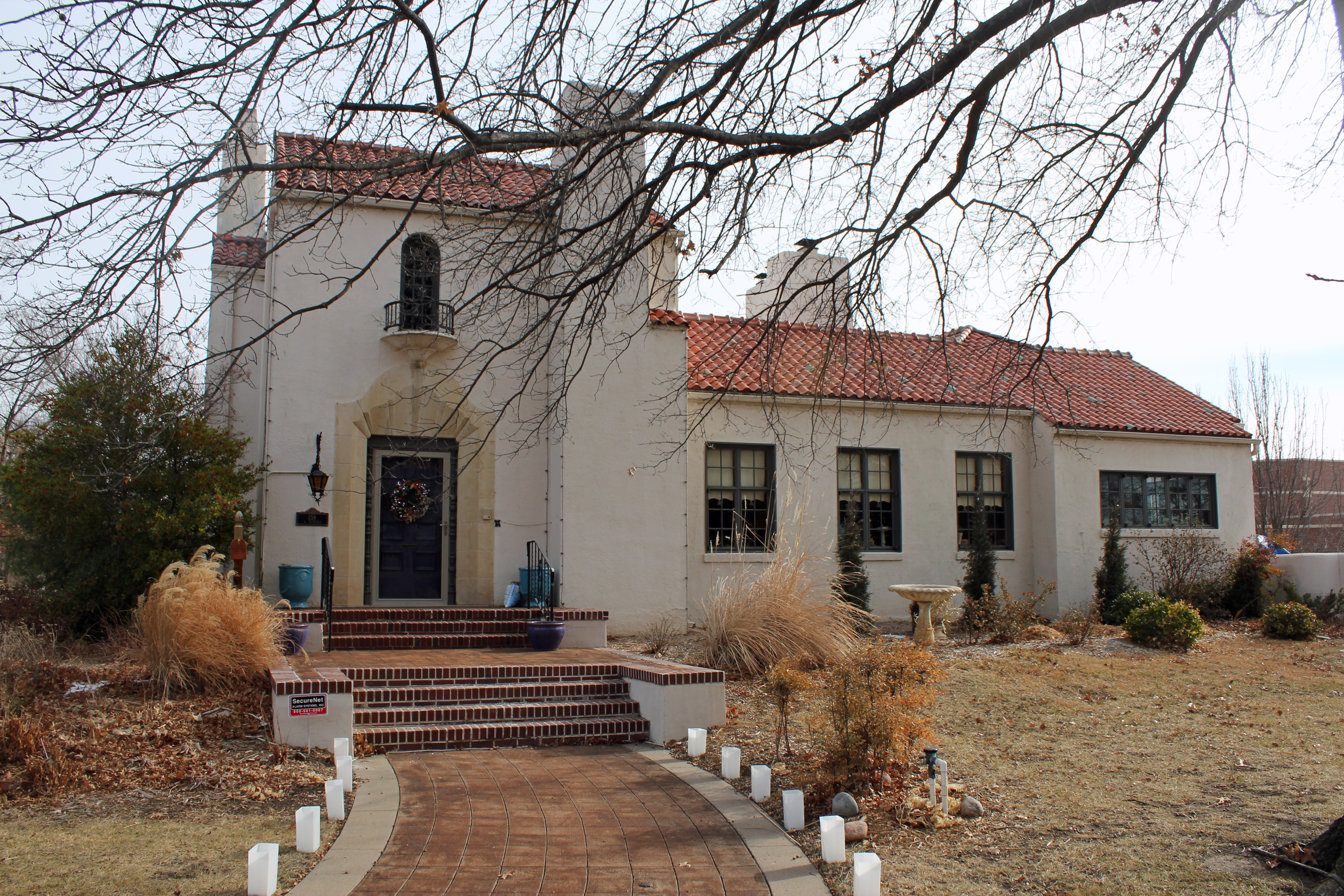
The C. M. Jackman House (2013)

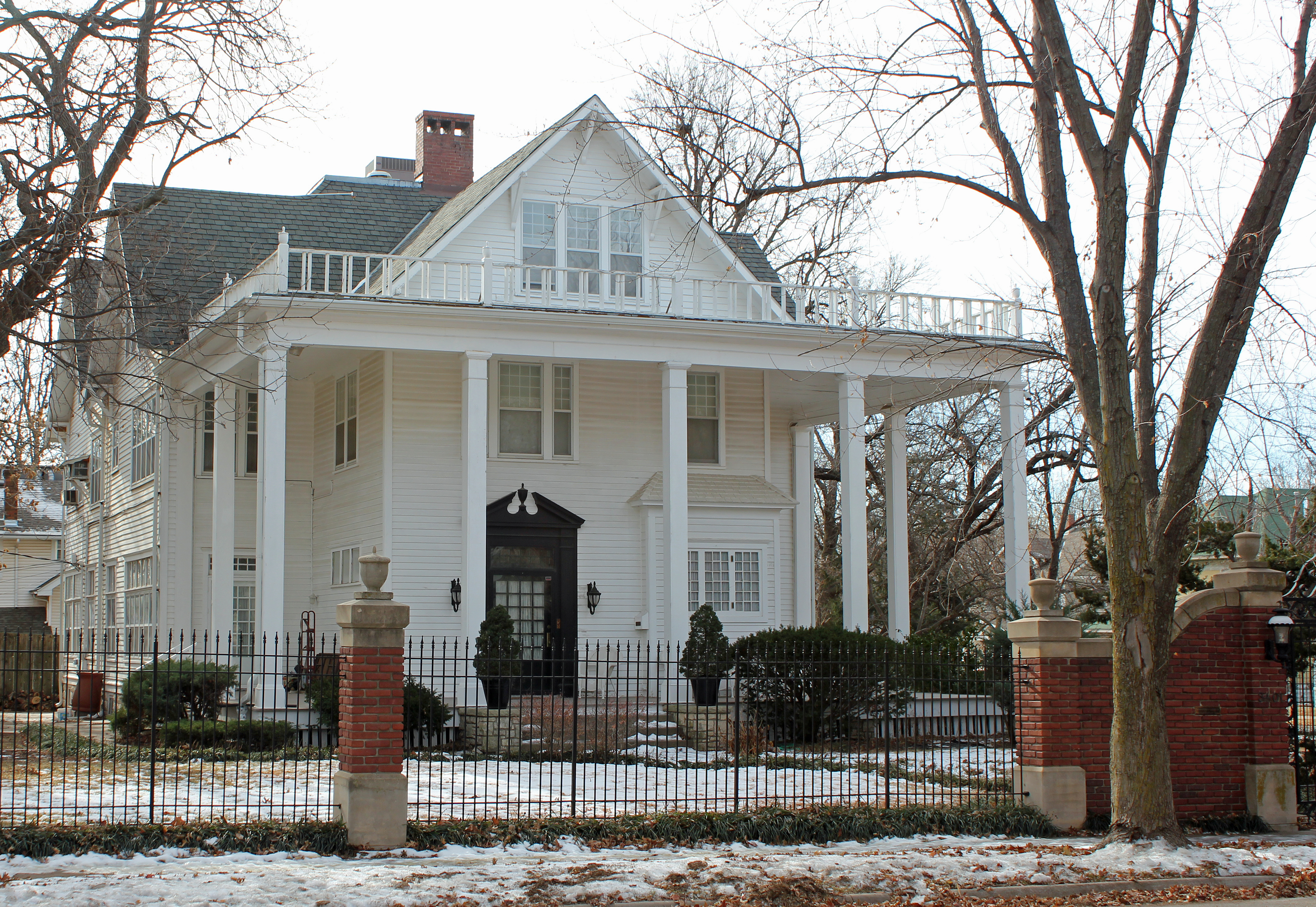
Chester Long House (2013)

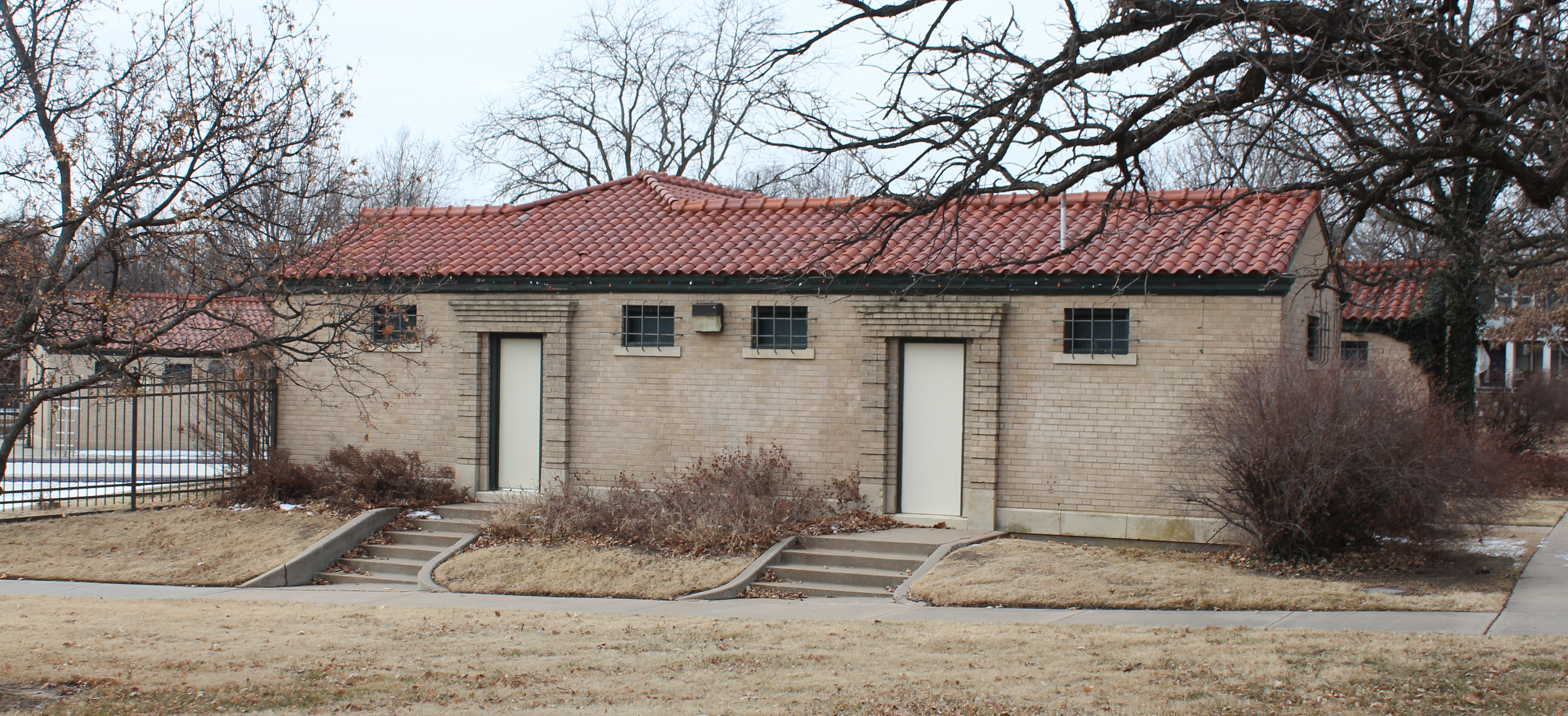
The College Hill Park Bathhouse (2013)

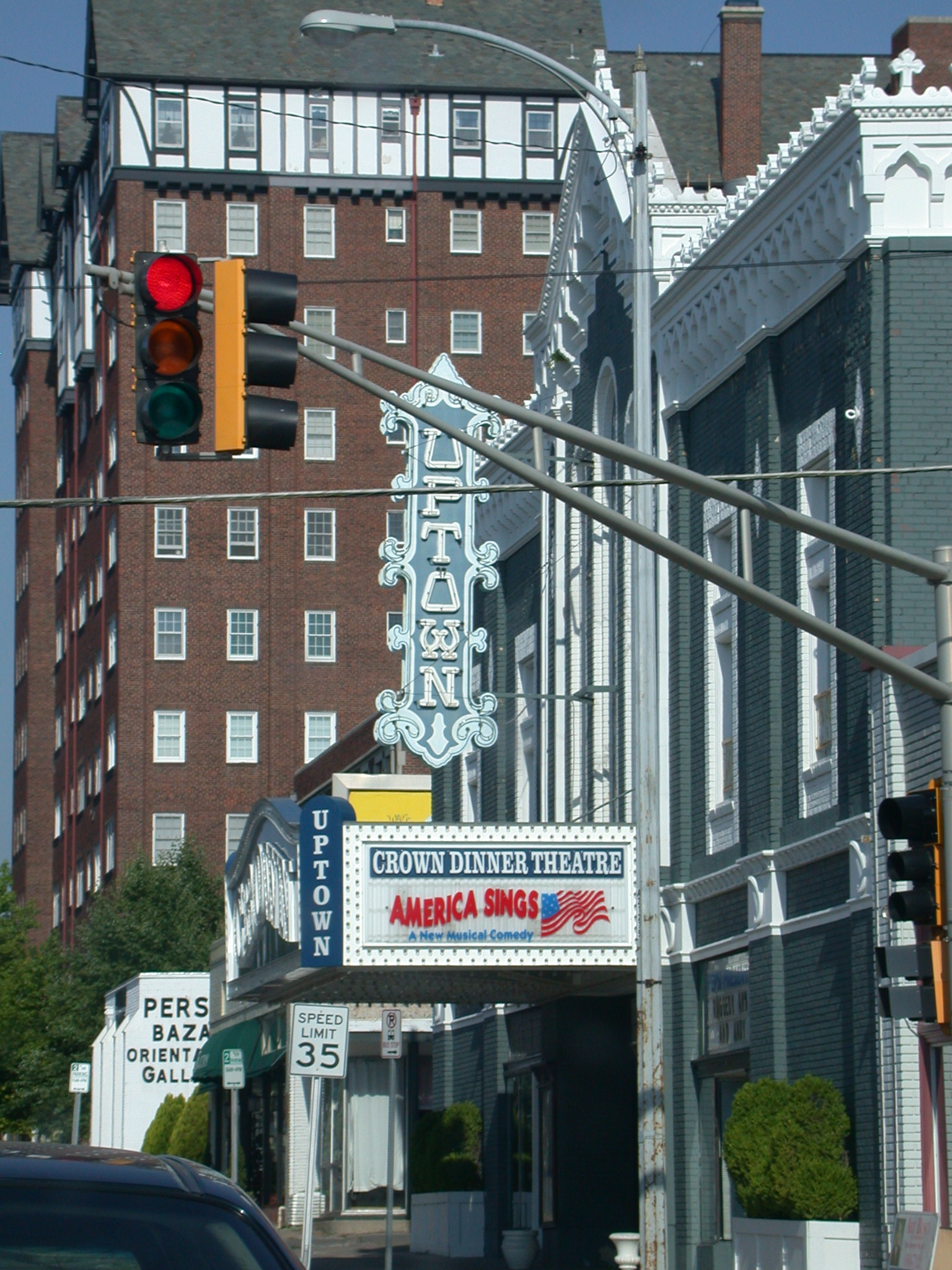
The Crown Uptown Theatre with the Hillcrest Apartments in the background (2003)

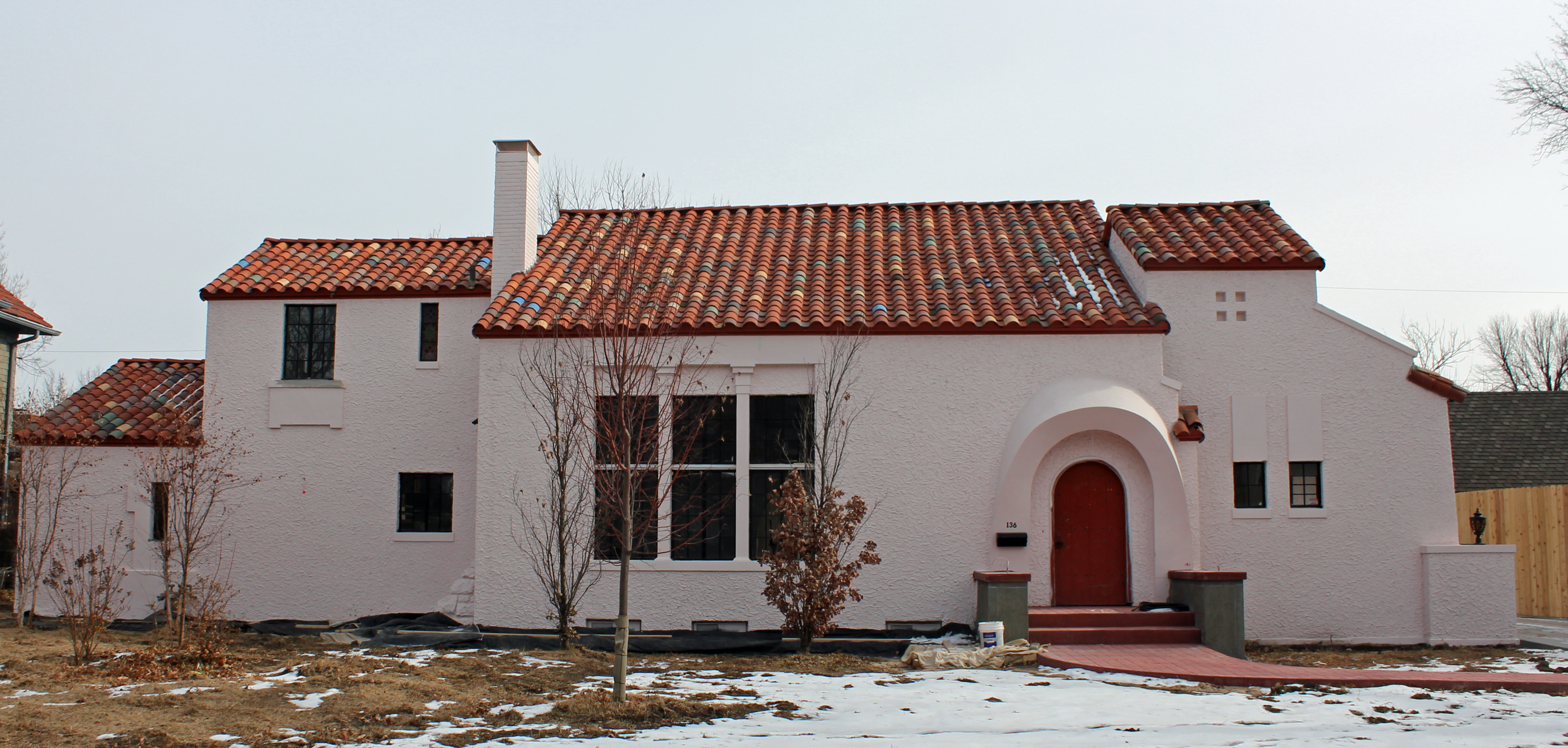
Frank Blaser House (2013)

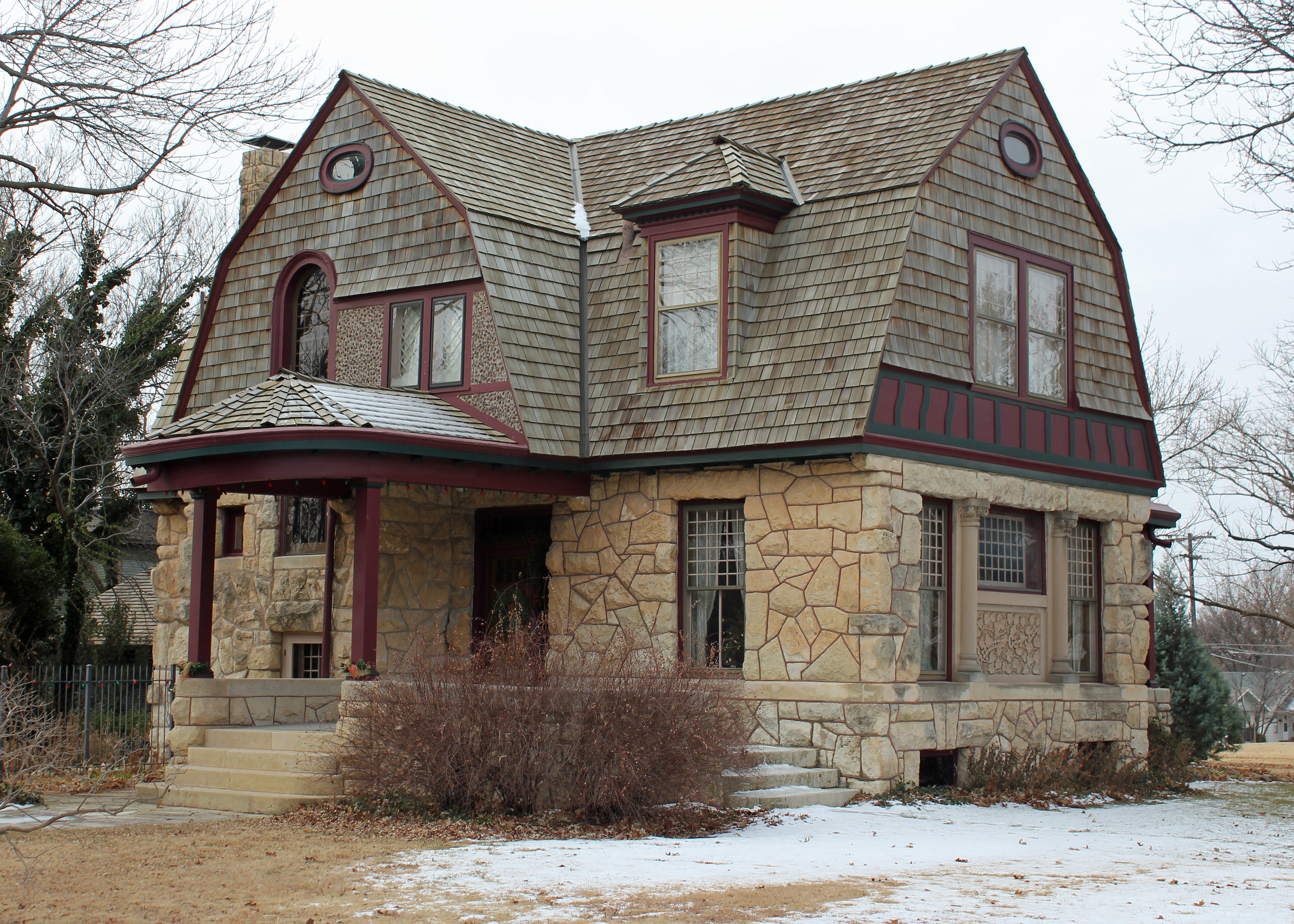
Hillside Cottage (2013)

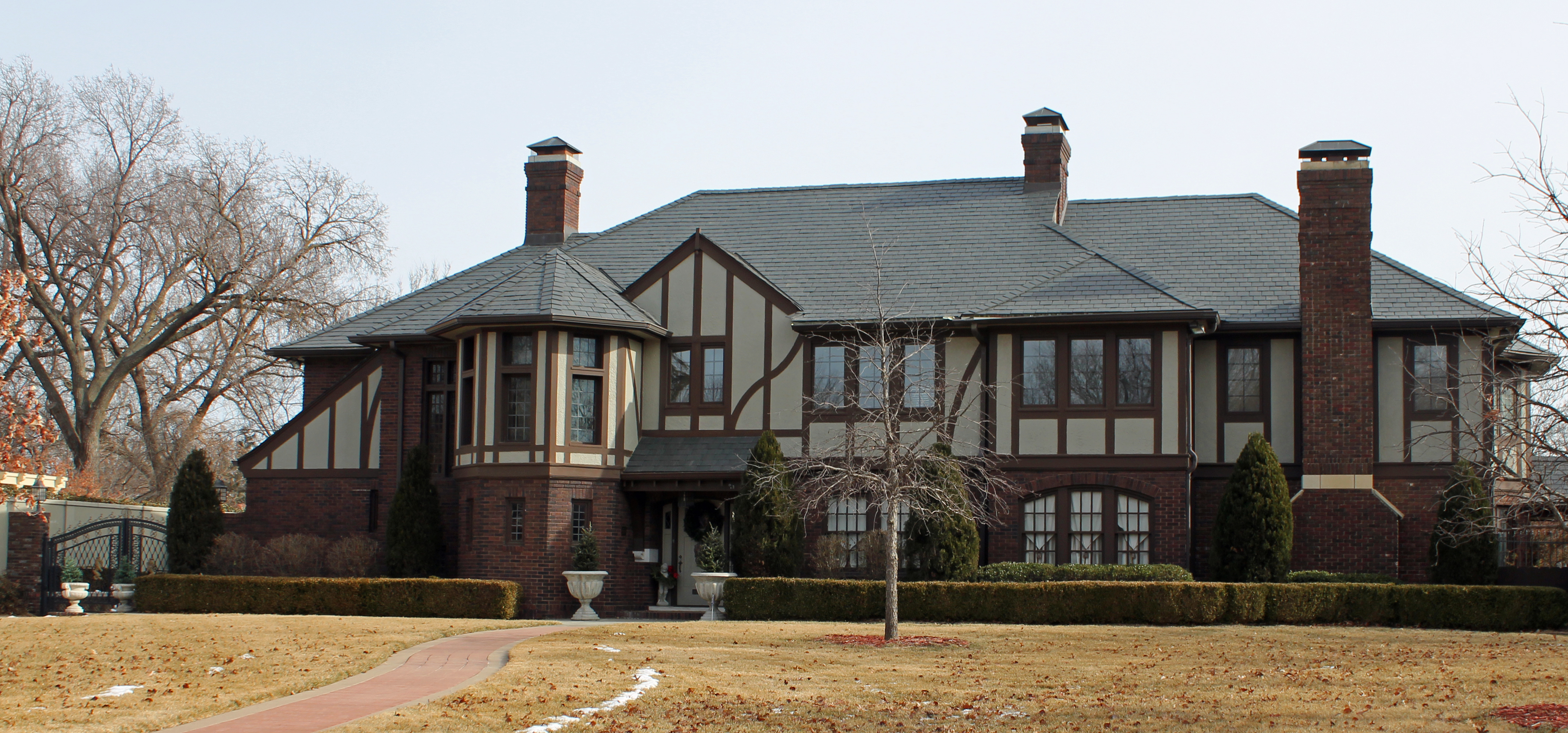
Powell House (2013)

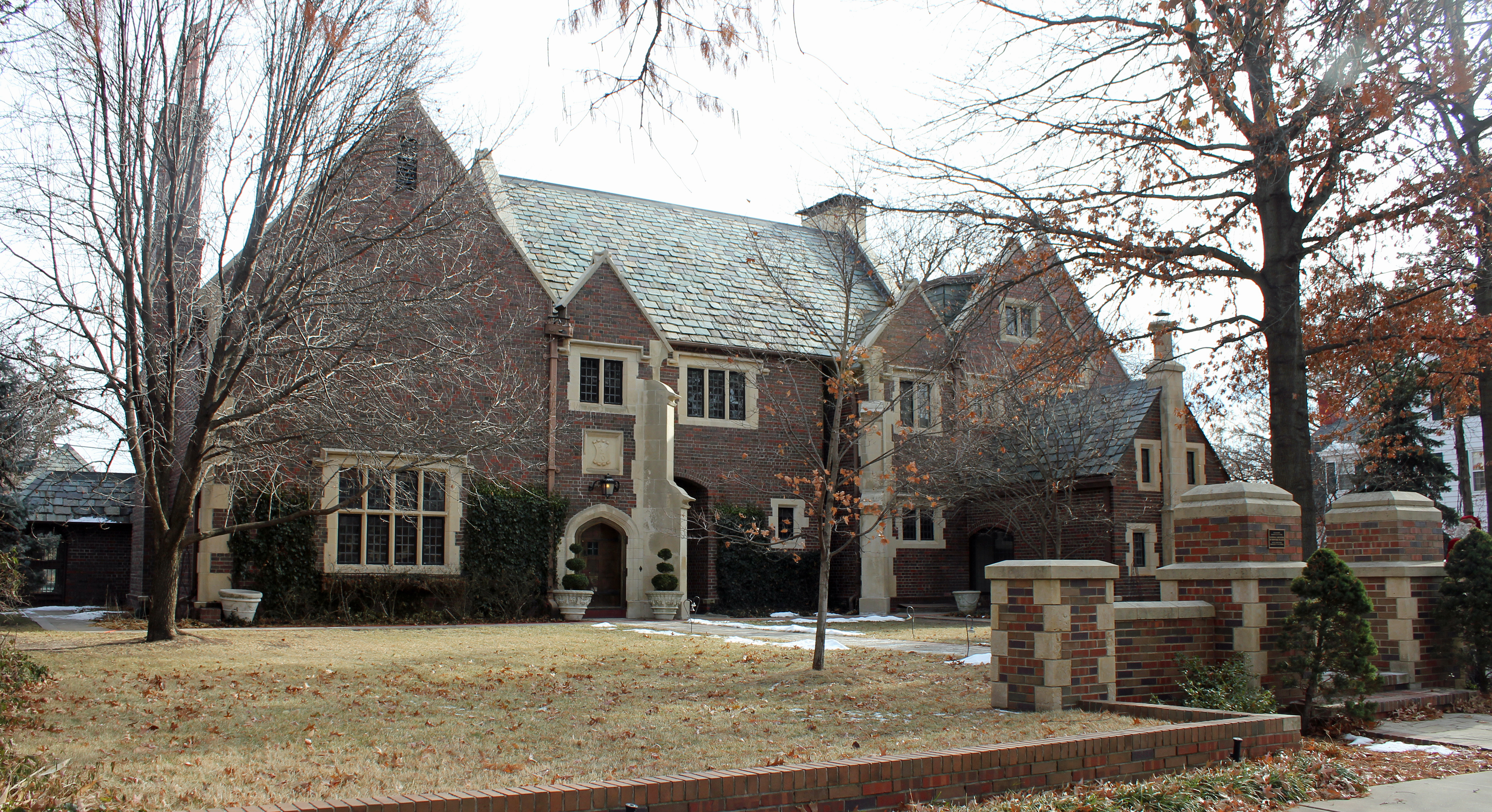
R. D. W. Clapp House (2013)
