= Orchard Park, Wichita, Kansas =

Orchard Park
- Neighborhood
- Interactive map of Orchard Park
- Coordinates: 37°42′05″N 97°23′51″W
- Country: United States
- State: Kansas
- County: Sedgwick
- City: Wichita
- Elevation: 1,312 ft (400 m)

Population (2016)
  - Total: 3,780
- ZIP code: 67203, 67212
- Area code: 316

Orchard Park is a neighborhood in Wichita, Kansas, United States. A predominantly residential area, it is located in the west-central part of the city on the east side of Interstate 235.

== Geography ==
Orchard Park is located at 37°42′05″N 97°23′51″W (37.701389, -97.3975) at an elevation of 1,312 ft (400 m). It consists of the area between Zoo Boulevard to the northeast, West Street to the east, Central Avenue to the south, and Interstate 235 to the west and northwest. The La Placita Park neighborhood lies to the east, Sunflower lies to the southeast, and Orchard Breeze lies to the south.

== Government ==
For the purposes of representation on the Wichita City Council, Orchard Park is in Council District 6.

For the purposes of representation in the Kansas Legislature, Orchard Park is in the 25th district of the Kansas Senate and the 105th district of the Kansas House of Representatives.

== Education ==
Wichita Public Schools operates one school in Orchard Park: Hadley Middle School.

== Parks and recreation ==
Maintained by the city's Department of Park and Recreation, Orchard Park—the neighborhood’s namesake—occupies 19.82 acres (8.02 ha) on West 9th Street. It includes a baseball field, basketball court, children’s playground, recreation center, skatepark, soccer field, swimming pool, tennis court, and walking path.

== Transportation ==
The arterial roads of the neighborhood are those that form its perimeter: Zoo Boulevard, which runs northwest-southeast, runs along the northeast side; West Street, which runs north-south, runs along the east side; Central Avenue, which runs east-west, along the south side. 13th Street runs east-west through the northern part of the neighborhood. The Interstate 235 freeway runs along the west and northwest sides of the neighborhood and is accessible via interchanges at Zoo Boulevard and Central.

Wichita Transit offers bus service to Orchard Park on its 12, and 15 routes.
