= La Placita Park, Wichita, Kansas =

La Placita Park
- Neighborhood
- Interactive map of La Placita Park
- Coordinates: 37°42′08″N 97°23′13″W
- Country: United States
- State: Kansas
- County: Sedgwick
- City: Wichita
- Elevation: 1,311 ft (400 m)

Population (2016)
  - Total: 2,755
- ZIP code: 67203
- Area code: 316

La Placita Park is a neighborhood in Wichita, Kansas, United States. A mixed commercial and residential area, it is located in the west-central part of the city.

== Geography ==
La Placita Park is located at 37°42′08″N 97°23′13″W (37.702222, -97.386944) at an elevation of 1,311 ft (400 m). It consists of the area between 13th Street to the north, Sheridan Street to the east, Central Avenue to the south, and West Street to the west. The Northwest Big River neighborhood lies to the north, Indian Hills Riverbend lies to the northeast, Indian Hills lies to the east, Sunflower lies to the south, Orchard Breeze lies to the southwest, and Orchard Park lies to the west.

== Government ==
For the purposes of representation on the Wichita City Council, La Placita Park is in Council District 6.

For the purposes of representation in the Kansas Legislature, La Placita Park is in the 25th district of the Kansas Senate and the 92nd and 95th districts of the Kansas House of Representatives.

== Education ==
Wichita Public Schools operates one school in La Placita Park: Black Traditional Magnet Elementary School.

== Transportation ==
Zoo Boulevard, which runs northwest-southeast, is the main road through La Placita Park. The other arterial roads of the neighborhood are those that form part of its perimeter: 13th Street, which runs east-west, along the north side; Central Avenue, which runs east-west, along the south side; West Street, which runs north-south, along the west side.

Wichita Transit offers bus service to La Placita Park on its 12 and 15 routes.

Kansas and Oklahoma Railroad operates one freight rail line through the neighborhood. The line runs northwest-southeast, parallel to Zoo Boulevard.
