= East Front, Wichita, Kansas =

East Front
- Neighborhood
- Interactive map of East Front
- Coordinates: 37°40′56″N 97°18′16″W
- Country: United States
- State: Kansas
- County: Sedgwick
- City: Wichita
- Elevation: 1,298 ft (396 m)

Population (2016)
  - Total: 1,320
- ZIP code: 67211
- Area code: 316

East Front is a neighborhood in Wichita, Kansas, United States. A predominantly residential area, it is located in the east-central part of the city on the north side of U.S. Route 54.

== Geography ==
East Front is located at 37°40′56″N 97°18′16″W (37.682222, -97.304444) at an elevation of 1,298 ft (396 m). It consists of the area between Douglas Avenue in the north and U.S. 54 in the south and between Grove Street in the west and Hillside Street in the east. East Front borders Uptown to the north, College Hill to the east, Longview to the southeast, Sunnyside to the south, and New Salem to the northwest.

== Government ==
For the purposes of representation on the Wichita City Council, East Front is in Council District 1.

For the purposes of representation in the Kansas Legislature, East Front is in the 29th district of the Kansas Senate and in the 86th district of the Kansas House of Representatives.

== Education ==
The campus of Wichita East High School, part of Wichita Public Schools, is on East Douglas Avenue immediately west of East Front.

The City Center campus of WSU Tech is located on South Grove Street immediately west of East Front.

== Transportation ==
All the main streets in East Front run along its periphery: Douglas Avenue, which runs east-west along its northern border; Hillside Street, which runs north-south along its eastern side; and Grove Street, which runs north-south along its western side. U.S. Route 54 runs east-west along the south side of the neighborhood as the Kellogg Avenue freeway, accessible via interchanges at Grove and Hillside.

Wichita Transit offers bus service in East Front on its 21 and 24 routes. On Fridays and Saturdays, the Douglas route of the free Q-Line trolley also services the neighborhood.
