= Southwest, Wichita, Kansas =

Southwest
- Neighborhood
- Interactive map of Southwest
- Coordinates: 37°38′16″N 97°21′25″W
- Country: United States
- State: Kansas
- County: Sedgwick
- City: Wichita
- Elevation: 1,284 ft (391 m)

Population (2016)
  - Total: 13,607
- ZIP code: 67213, 67217
- Area code: 316

Southwest is a mixed commercial and residential neighborhood in Wichita, Kansas, United States. It consists of a large area west of the Arkansas River in the southern part of the city.

== Geography ==
Southwest is located at 37°38′16″N 97°21′25″W (37.637778, -97.356944) at an elevation of 1,284 ft (391 m). It consists of the area between Meridian Avenue in the west and McLean Boulevard in the east and between May Street in the north and MacArthur Road in the south. Southwest borders the neighborhoods of Stanley/Aley to the north, South Central to the northeast, South Seneca to the south, and Southwest Village to the west.

== Economy ==
Westway Shopping Center, a large strip mall, is located in Southwest on the southwest corner of Pawnee and Seneca. Built in the 1960s, it contains more than 224,000 sq ft (20,800 m^{2}) of retail space.

== Government ==
For the purposes of representation on the Wichita City Council, most of Southwest lies in Council District 4. The portion of the neighborhood south of 27th Street South and east of Seneca is in Council District 3 as is the portion north of 27th Street South and east of Osage Street.

For the purposes of representation in the Kansas Legislature, Southwest is split between the 25th and 28th districts of the Kansas Senate and the 95th, 96th, and 97th districts of the Kansas House of Representatives.

== Education ==
Wichita Public Schools operates six schools in Southwest:

- Enders Open Magnet Elementary School
- Enterprise Elementary School
- Kelly Liberal Arts Academy
- Truesdell Middle School
- Wichita South High School
- Woodman Elementary School

The Roman Catholic Diocese of Wichita oversees one Catholic elementary school in the neighborhood: St. Anne School.

== Parks and recreation ==
The city's Department of Park and Recreation maintains three parks in and around Southwest. Located at the corner of South Hiram and West Greenfield Street, Glenn Village Park is a 1-acre (0.40 ha) neighborhood park with a children's playground. O. J. Watson Park lies immediately east of Southwest on South McLean Boulevard. Spanning 119 acres (48 ha), it includes a community facility, miniature golf course, three playgrounds, pony rides, 32 sand volleyball courts, and a 40-acre (16 ha) fishing lake. 20-acre (8.1 ha) Osage Park is located at 31st Street South and Everett Street and includes a basketball court, children's playground, interactive water fountain, two softball diamonds, and two tennis courts.

== Transportation ==
The main arterial roads through Southwest are, running east–west, Pawnee Street and 31st Street South and, running north–south, Seneca Street. Meridian Avenue runs north–south along the west side of the neighborhood while McLean Boulevard runs north–south along the east side. South of 31st Street, McLean becomes Gold Street. MacArthur Road runs east–west along the far south side. The Interstate 235 bypass runs east–west through southern Southwest, accessible via interchanges at Seneca and Meridian.

Wichita Transit offers bus service in Southwest on its 14 and 16 routes.
