= Linwood, Wichita, Kansas =

Linwood
- Neighborhood
- Interactive map of Linwood
- Coordinates: 37°40′05″N 97°19′15″W
- Country: United States
- State: Kansas
- County: Sedgwick
- City: Wichita
- Elevation: 1,291 ft (393 m)
- ZIP code: 67211
- Area code: 316

Linwood is a residential neighborhood in Wichita, Kansas, United States. It lies in the south-central part of the city west of Interstate 135.

== Geography ==
Linwood is located at 37°40′05″N 97°19′15″W (37.668056, -97.320833) at an elevation of 1,291 ft (393 m). It consists of the area between Southeast Boulevard in the west and south, Lincoln Street in the north, and Hydraulic Avenue in the east. The Hyde neighborhood lies to the north, Schweiter to the east, Mead to the southeast, and South Central to the south and west.

== Government ==
For the purposes of representation on the Wichita City Council, most of Linwood is in Council District 1. A small portion of the neighborhood south of Mount Vernon Street is in Council District 3.

For the purposes of representation in the Kansas Legislature, Linwood is in the 25th district of the Kansas Senate and the 86th district of the Kansas House of Representatives.

== Education ==
Wichita USD 259 public schools operates one facility in Linwood: Linwood Elementary School.

The Linwood Park branch of the Wichita Public Library is located on South Kansas Street in Linwood Park, but will be moving in 2021.

Schools closed in past decades:

- Former Linwood Elementary - 1340 Pattie, 2 story building built in 1910, demolished but multipurpose room still exists.

== Parks and recreation ==
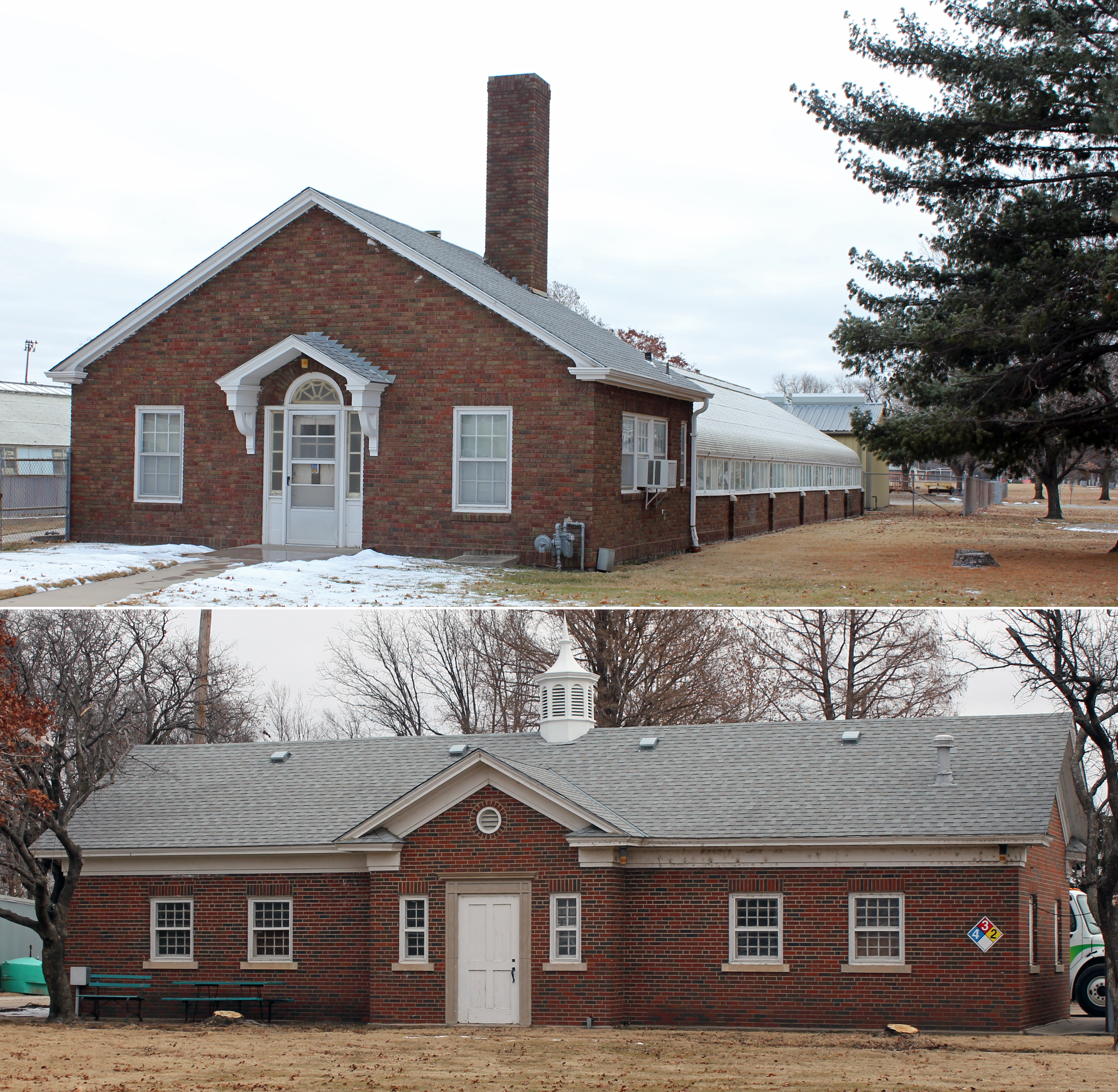
The Park Department greenhouse (top) and maintenance building (bottom) in South Linwood Park. (2018)

The city's Department of Park and Recreation maintains four parks in and around Linwood: Goldenrod Park, Henry Park, North Linwood Park, and South Linwood Park. 2.05-acre (0.83 ha) Goldenrod Park is the former site of Linwood Elementary School and includes a community facility available for rent. Henry Park is a 2-acre (0.81 ha) neighborhood park on South Ellis Street with a playground and a softball diamond. North Linwood Park spans 14.28 acres (5.78 ha) north of Harry Street and east of Hydraulic Avenue. It includes a playground, an open shelter, an assembly area with a stage and seating for 300, and biking and fitness trails. South Linwood Park covers 51.12 acres (20.69 ha) south of Harry Street and east of Hydraulic Avenue. It is the site of the city Park Department's greenhouse, nursery, and recreation center as well as baseball diamonds, a basketball court, biking and hiking trails, a football field, horseshoe courts, a playground, a swimming pool, tennis courts, tetherball courts, and a volleyball court.

== Transportation ==
The primary roads through Linwood are Hydraulic Avenue, which runs north–south along the east side of the neighborhood, and Southeast Boulevard, which runs southeast–northwest along the west side of the neighborhood. Other arterial roads include Lincoln Street, which runs east–west along the north side of the neighborhood, and Harry Street, which runs east–west through its center. Interstate 135 runs north–south east of North and South Linwood Parks, accessible via interchanges at Lincoln and Harry.

Wichita Transit offers bus service to Linwood on its 14, 22, and 29 routes.
