= Allen–Lambe House =

Historic house in Kansas, United States

- Henry J. Allen House
- U.S. National Register of Historic Places
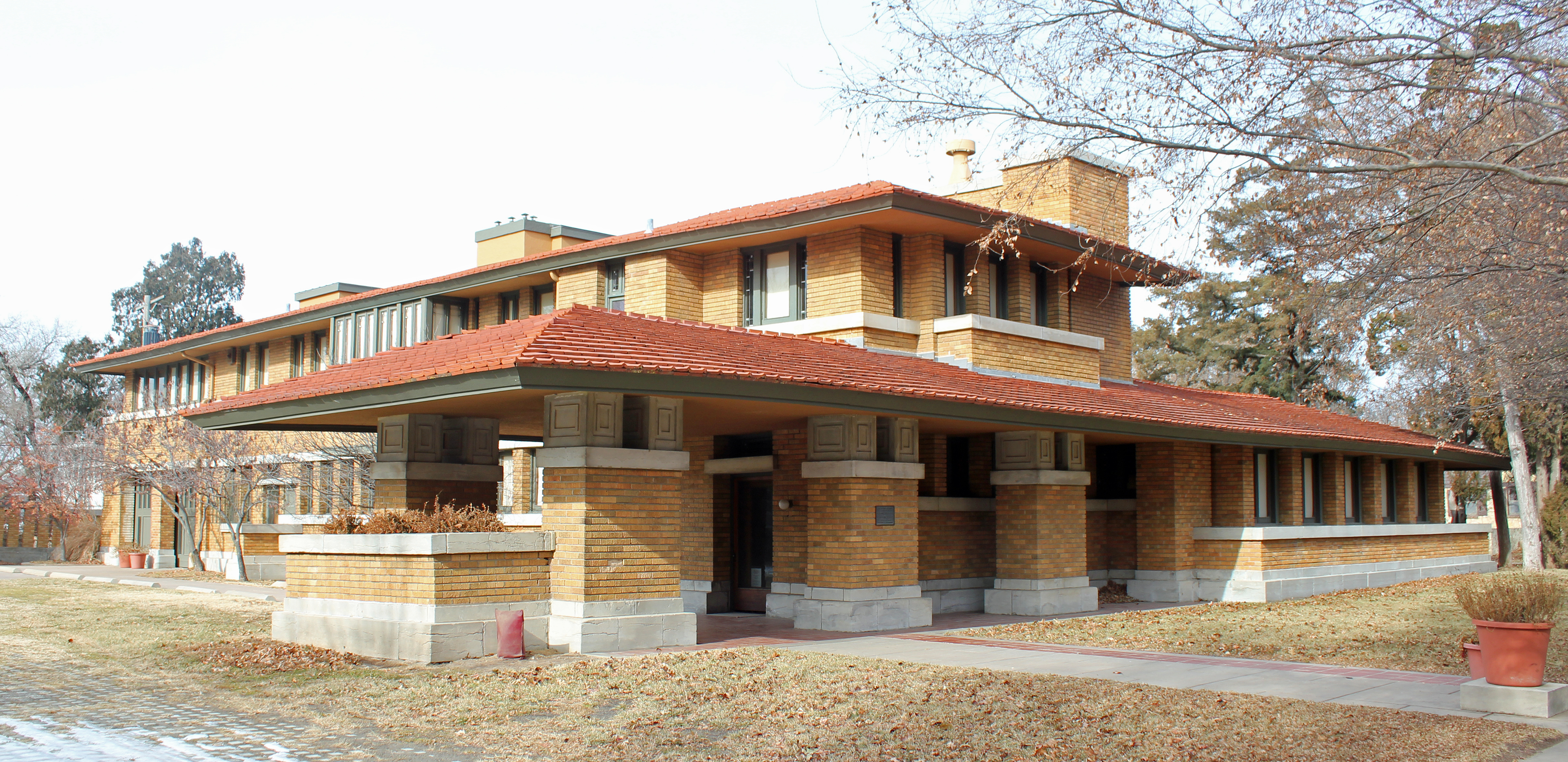
- The house in late 2013

- Location within Kansas Location within the United States
- Location: 255 N. Roosevelt St., Wichita, Kansas
- Coordinates: 37°41′24″N 97°17′33″W
- Area: 1 acre (0.40 ha)
- Built: 1917
- Architect: Frank Lloyd Wright
- Architectural style: Prairie School
- NRHP reference No.: 73000775
- Added to NRHP: March 7, 1973

The Allen–Lambe House (also known as the Henry J. Allen House and the Allen House) is a Prairie Style home in Wichita, Kansas, designed by Frank Lloyd Wright in 1915 for former Kansas Governor Henry Justin Allen and his wife, Elsie.

== Description and history ==
It was one of Frank Lloyd Wright's last Prairie Houses. The design influence of the prairie and Japanese architecture (Wright was working on the Imperial Hotel in Japan at the time) is apparent on both the exterior and interior.

The building's exterior features a horizontal grey Carthage marble water table as a transitional element between the ground and the house, white horizontal brick joints and flush ocher head joints. The roof was designed with an emphasis on horizontal lines and covered with Ludowici tiles, featuring a unique Japanese-inspired starting course.

The house's interior continued the use of brick in a blend of ochre and buff colors, with joints gilded horizontally. The living and dining rooms wrap around a sunken garden filled with lilies and koi fish. A terrace paved in quarry tile extends in from the outside, and helps to blend the two spaces. The building was designed with a central vacuuming unit, an alarm system and gas fireplace logs. Another innovation was the first firewall in a residential home. The bricks contain iron, giving it a rust color.

It is currently run by the Allen House Foundation as a museum under the stewardship of the Wichita Center for the Arts. The house was listed on the National Register of Historic Places on March 7, 1973.

== See also ==
- List of Frank Lloyd Wright works
- National Register of Historic Places listings in Sedgwick County, Kansas
