= South Central, Wichita, Kansas =

South Central
- Neighborhood
- Interactive map of South Central
- Coordinates: 37°39′37″N 97°20′08″W
- Country: United States
- State: Kansas
- County: Sedgwick
- City: Wichita
- Elevation: 1,289 ft (393 m)

Population (2016)
  - Total: 9,265
- ZIP code: 67211, 67213, 67216
- Area code: 316

South Central is a neighborhood in Wichita, Kansas, United States. A mixed commercial and residential area on the east bank of the Arkansas River, it is among the city’s oldest neighborhoods.

== History ==
South Central was subdivided and developed in the early 1900s as a residential neighborhood for workers commuting downtown via street car. In addition, fairgrounds were built at its south end along the east bank of the Arkansas River. Aside from a few small businesses, it remained a residential area of single-family houses until World War II. The routing of U.S. Route 81 onto Broadway Avenue, which runs north-south through South Central, along with rail lines further east triggered commercial and industrial development. Motels, restaurants, and service stations opened along Broadway in the 1950s and 1960s. Similarly, warehouses and industrial facilities were built along the railroad. In the 1980s, U.S. 81 was re-rerouted further east to run concurrently with Interstate 135, reducing traffic through the neighborhood. This led many of the businesses along Broadway to close or be converted to other uses such as used car lots. Many motels became dens for prostitution, turning the Broadway corridor into the city’s red light district. In 1995, neighborhood activists worked with the city government to create a revitalization plan to increase investment and improve residents’ quality of life. Subsequently, businesses redeveloped many of South Central’s commercial areas, renovating industrial facilities and opening new retail stores, hotels, and office buildings.

== Geography ==
South Central is located at 37°39′37″N 97°20′08″W (37.660278, -97.335556) at an elevation of 1,289 feet (393 m). The Arkansas River forms its western and southern boundary, and U.S. Route 54 is its northern boundary. Washington Avenue is its eastern boundary north of Pawnee Street, and the Union Pacific Railroad tracks are its eastern boundary south of Pawnee Street.

South Central borders Downtown Wichita to the north, Linwood to the east, South City to the southeast, Southwest across the river to the southwest, and Stanley/Aley and McCormick across the river to the west.

== Government ==
For the purposes of representation on the Wichita City Council, South Central is in Council District 3.

For the purposes of representation in the Kansas Legislature, South Central is located in the 25th and 28th districts of the Kansas Senate and the 86th, 96th, and 103rd districts of the Kansas House of Representatives.

== Education ==
Wichita Public Schools operates two schools in the neighborhood:

- Hamilton Middle School
- Harry Street Elementary School

== Parks and recreation ==
The city government's Park and Recreation Department manages two parks in South Central: Herman Hill Park and Lincoln Park. Named for a former Wichita mayor, Herman Hill Park lies on the east bank of the Arkansas River at South Broadway and Pawnee Street. Wooded and spanning 33 acres (13 ha), it includes a children's playground and an 18-hole frisbee disc golf course. The park is also home to the WATER Center and a police substation. 3-acre (1.2 ha) Lincoln Park is a small neighborhood park on South Broadway with a playground and interactive water fountain.

== Culture ==
=== Points of interest ===
- Kansas Firefighters Museum
- WATER Center

== Transportation ==
Broadway, which runs north-south, is the primary street through South Central. East-west arterial roads include: Lincoln Street, in the northern part of the neighborhood; Harry Street, in the central part; Mount Vernon Street, in the southern part; and Pawnee Street, which runs along the southern edge of the neighborhood. Washington Avenue runs north-south along the eastern border of the neighborhood. Along South Central's northern border, U.S. Route 54 runs east-west as the Kellogg Avenue freeway, accessible via interchanges at Main Street, Topeka, and Washington.

Wichita Transit offers bus service in South Central on its 14, 16, 22, 23, and 26 routes.

BNSF Railway, Union Pacific Railroad, and the Kansas and Oklahoma Railroad operate freight rail lines which run through South Central. North of Lincoln Street, the BNSF tracks run north-south, parallel to Mosley Street; south of Lincoln Street, the tracks run northwest-southeast, parallel to Southeast Boulevard. The UP tracks run north-south, parallel to Mead Street. North of Lincoln Street, the K&O tracks run north-south, parallel to Mosley Street; south of Lincoln Street, the tracks turn to run east-west, exiting the neighborhood to the west across the Arkansas River.

== Gallery ==
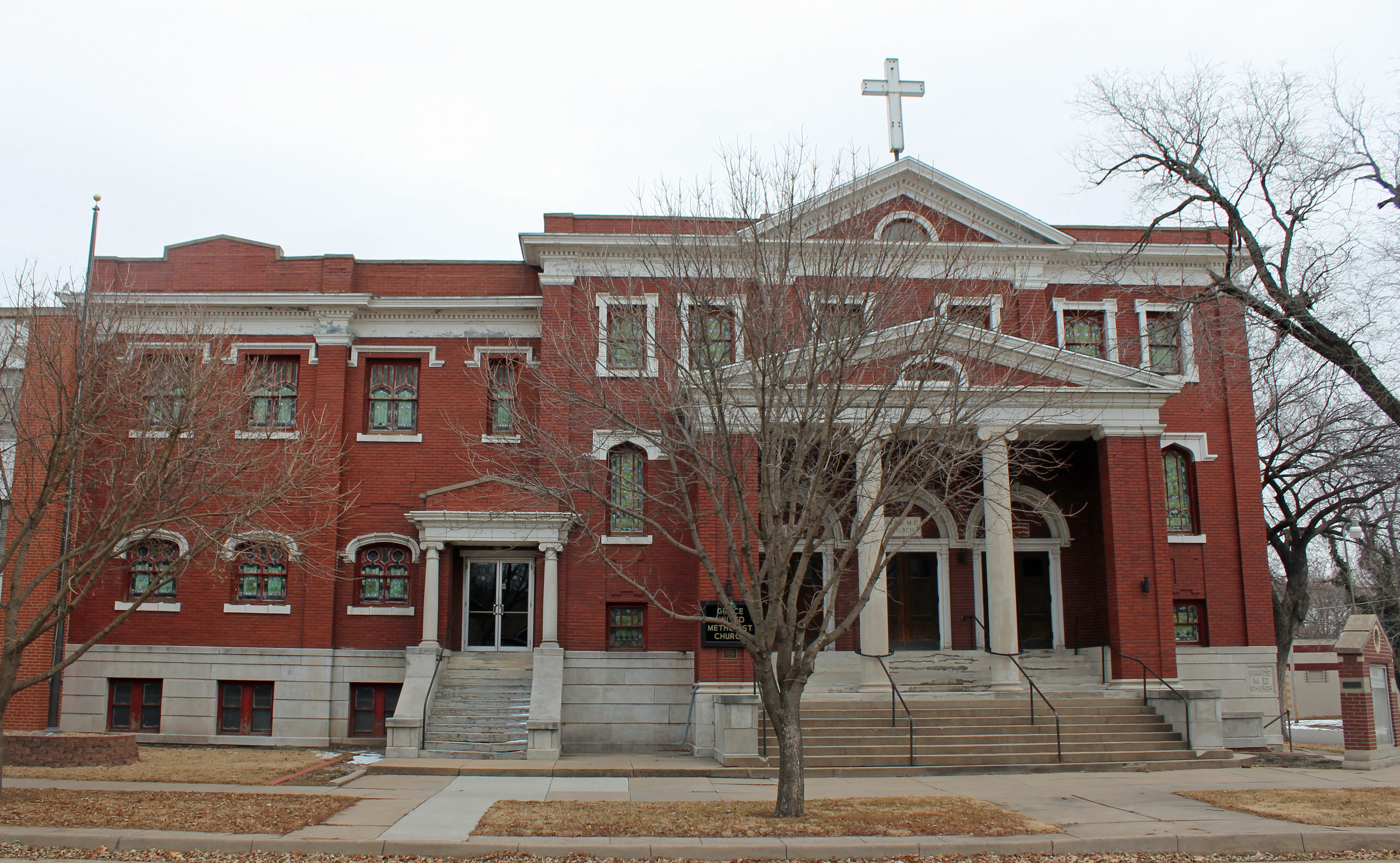
Grace Methodist Episcopal Church (2013)

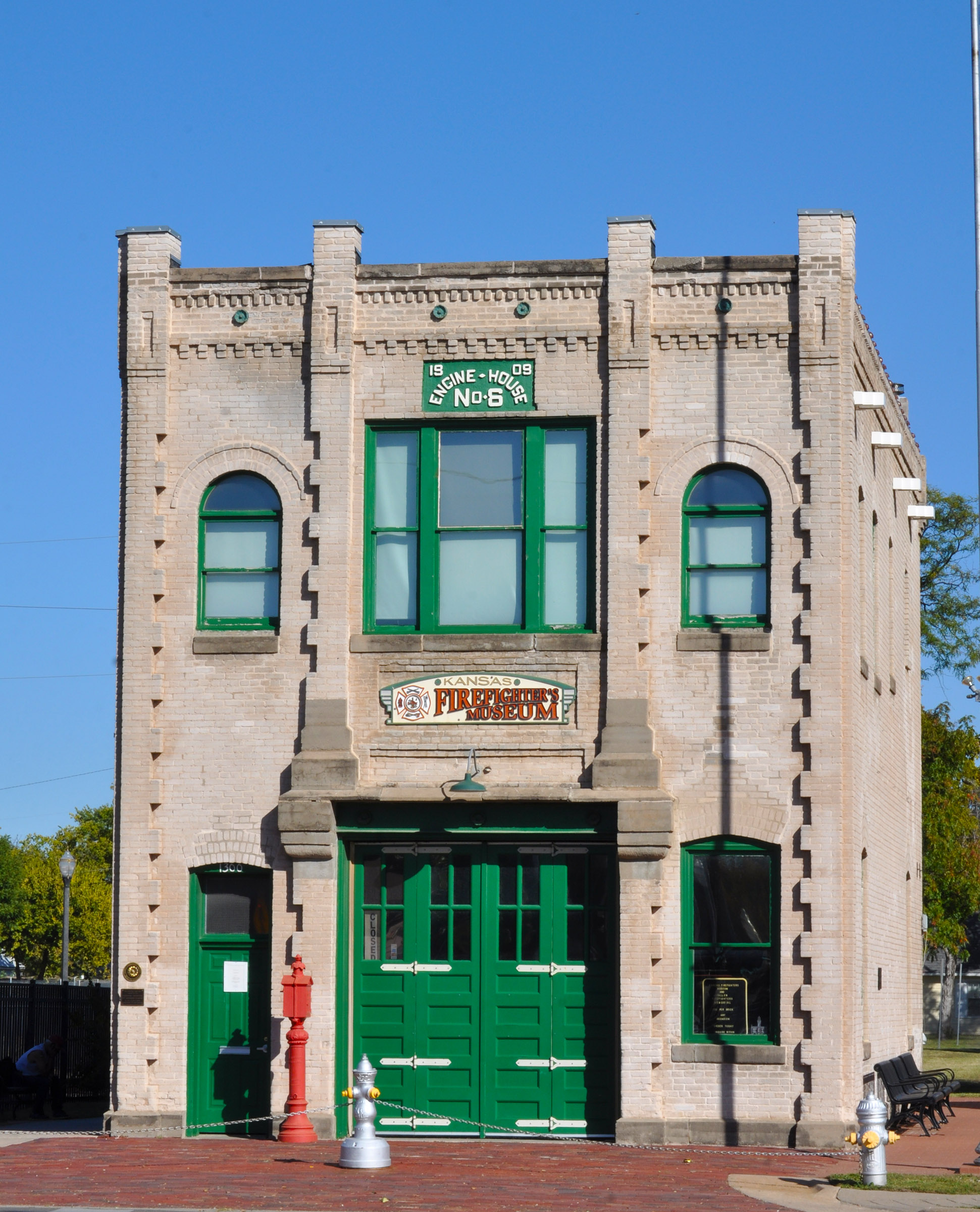
Kansas Firefighters Museum (2015)
