= Robert J. Schaefer =

American architect (1925–2006)

- Born: April 15, 1925; Wichita, Kansas
- Died: April 26, 2006 (aged 81); Lawrence, Kansas
- Occupation: Architect
- Awards: Fellow, American Institute of Architects (1981)
- Practice: Schaefer & Schirmer; Schaefer, Schirmer & Eflin; Schaefer, Schirmer & Associates PA; Schaefer & Associates PA; Schaefer, Johnson, Cox, Frey & Associates PA
- Buildings: Wichita Central Library (1967), Mid-America All-Indian Center (1976), Kansas Museum of History (1984)

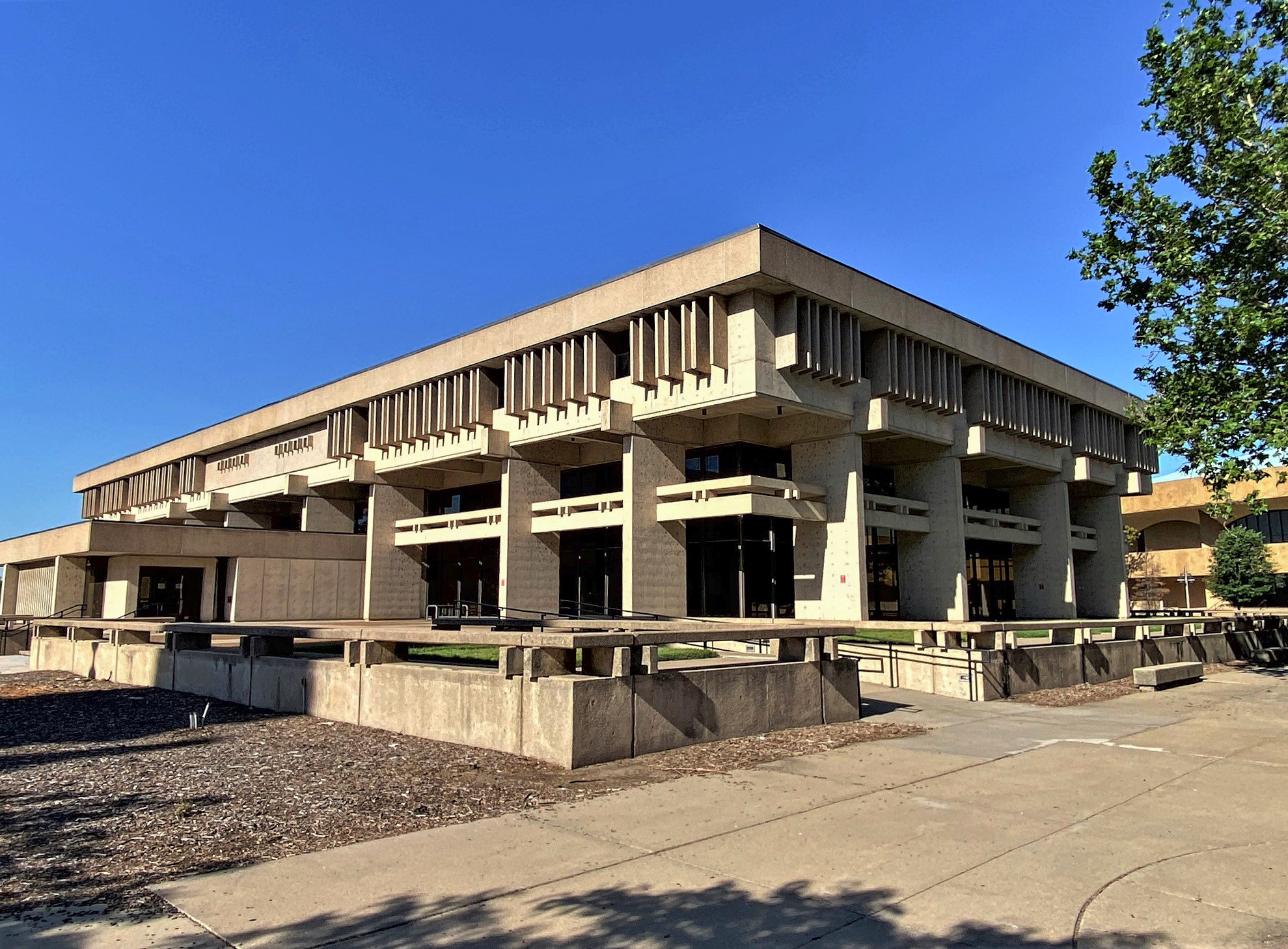
The former Wichita Central Library, designed by Schaefer, Schirmer & Eflin and completed in 1967.

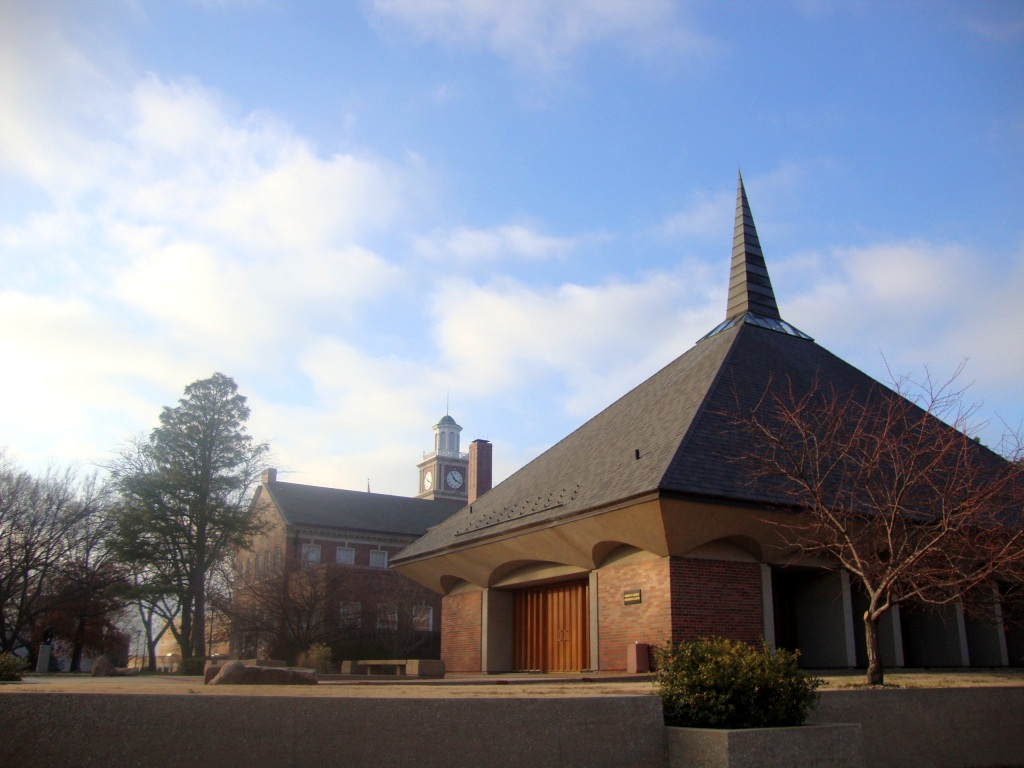
The Grace Memorial Chapel of Wichita State University, designed by Schaefer, Schirmer & Eflin and completed in 1964.

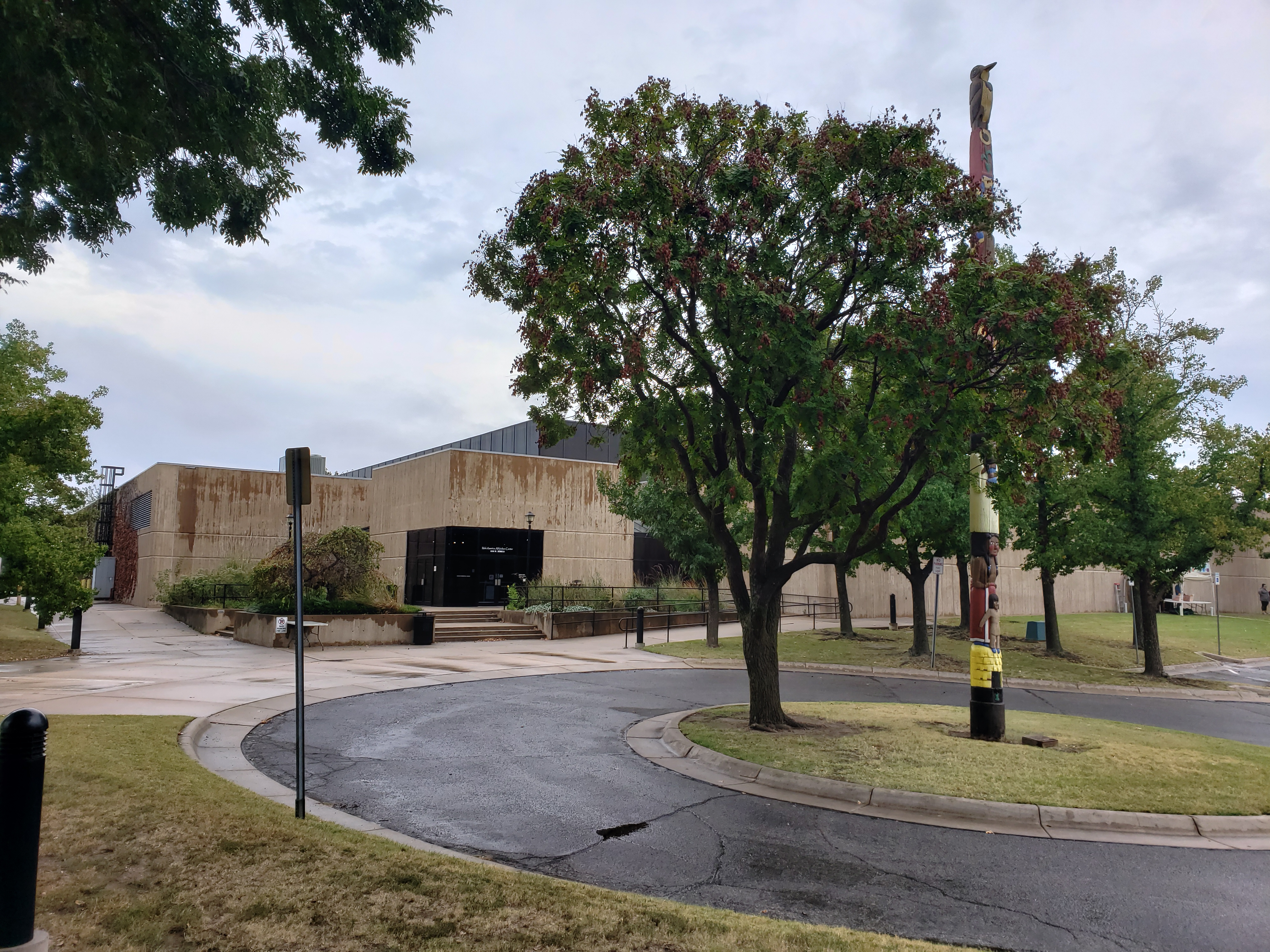
The Mid-America All-Indian Center in Wichita, designed by Schaefer & Schirmer and completed in 1976.

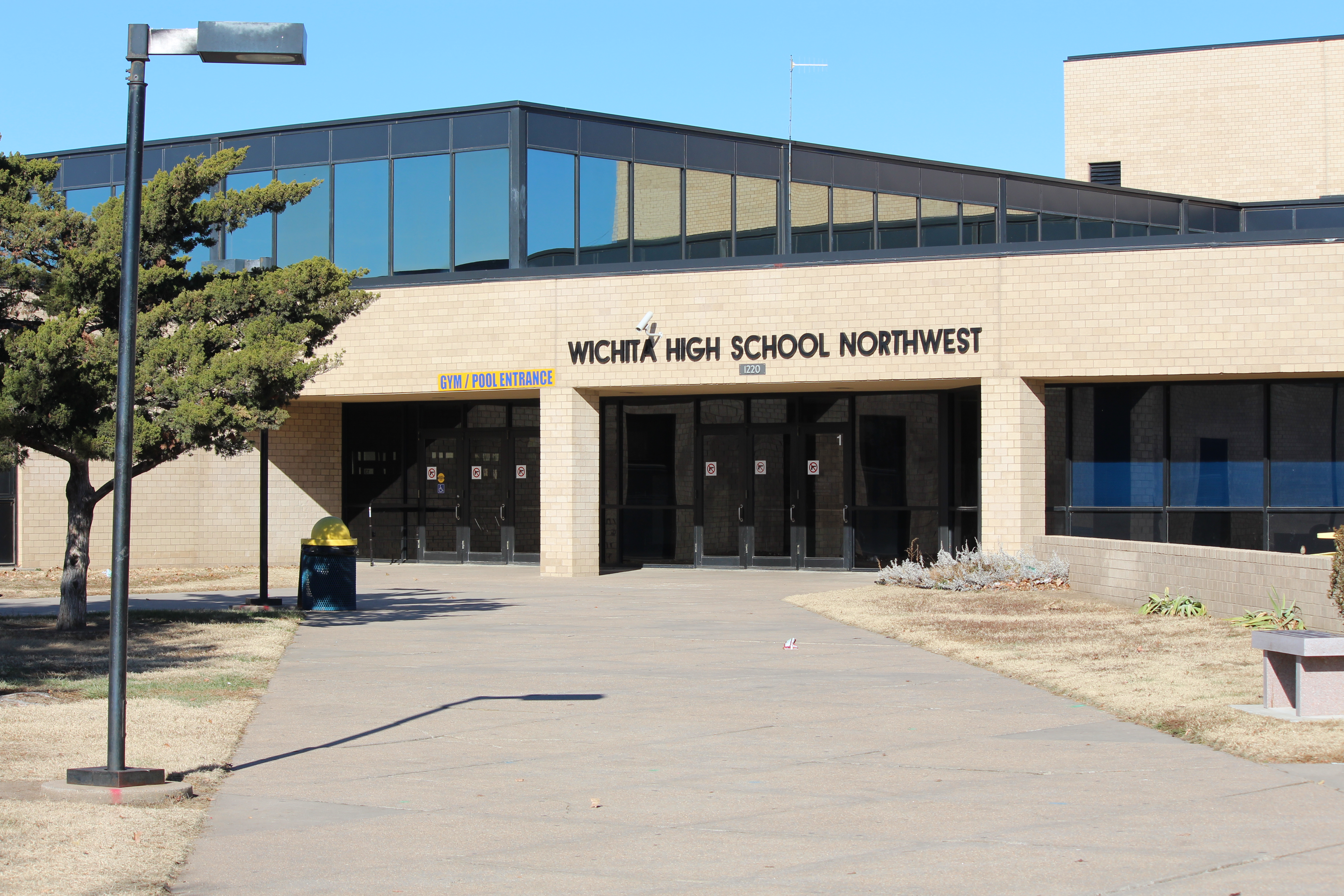
The Wichita Northwest High School, designed by Schaefer & Associates and completed in 1978.

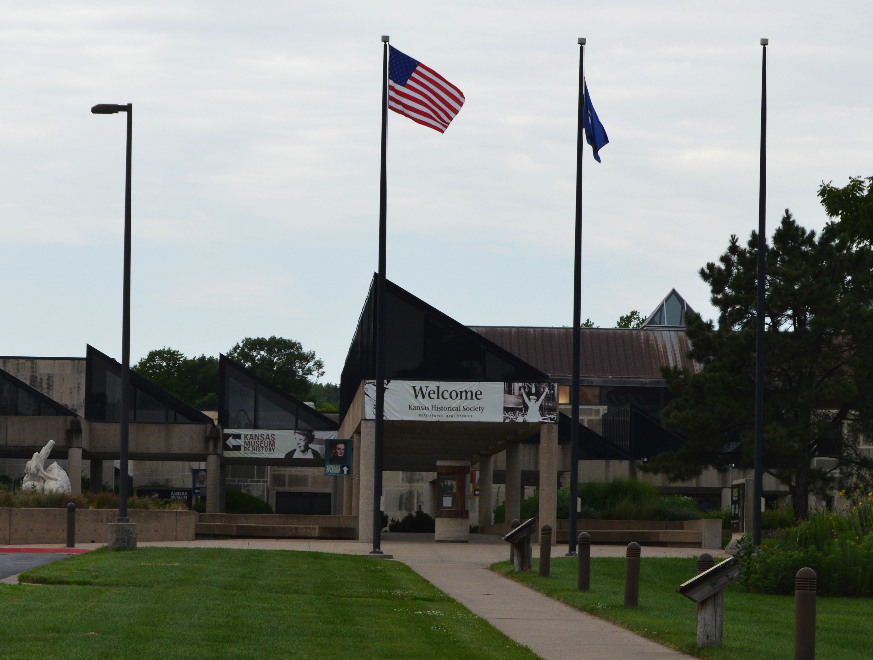
The Kansas Museum of History in Topeka, designed by Schaefer & Associates and completed in 1984.

Robert J. Schaefer FAIA (April 15, 1925 – April 26, 2006) was an American architect in practice in Wichita, Kansas from 1957 until his retirement in 1993. Schaefer's practice, known since 2023 as Schaefer Architecture, has had a major role in the spread of modern architecture in Kansas.

== Life and career ==
Robert Jules "Schaef" Schaefer was born April 15, 1925, in Wichita to Julius Earl Schaefer and Catherine Schaefer, née Rockwell. J. Earl Schaefer (July 11, 1893 – November 23, 1978) was a long-time Boeing executive who was general manager of Boeing's Wichita division from 1938 to 1957. Schaefer was educated in the Wichita public schools and at the University of Illinois, graduating with a BA in architecture in 1949. During World War II he had served in the air force. In 1950 he returned to Wichita, where he joined the office of Lorentz Schmidt, McVay & Peddie before moving to Ramey & Himes, later Uel C. Ramey & Associates, in 1951.

In 1957 Schaefer and another Ramey associate, Henry W. Schirmer, left to establish the independent partnership of Schaefer & Schirmer. Schaefer provided the firm's design leadership while Schirmer managed the office. The early work of the firm was influenced by the International Style and the work of Frank Lloyd Wright. In 1960 they were joined by another former Ramey employee, Robert D. Eflin, and the firm was renamed Schaefer, Schirmer & Eflin. Eflin, who had worked for John Carl Warnecke in San Francisco after leaving Ramey, was enticed with a partnership in place of his plan to enter the Massachusetts Institute of Technology to earn his MArch. After the addition of Eflin, he and Schaefer shared design responsibilities with the lion's share going to Eflin. Schaefer, Schirmer & Eflin was the most assertive firm in Kansas in spreading modernist architectural principles. They introduced Brutalist architecture to Kansas with their Wichita Central Library (1967), which was the first and thus far only building in Wichita to earn a national design award from the American Institute of Architects. In 1970 Schirmer moved to Topeka, where he established a branch office of the firm. In 1971 Eflin made the decision to leave the firm to finally earn his MArch, and in 1972 the firm was reorganized as Schaefer, Schirmer & Associates PA. At this time John L. Greer AIA and Daniel S. Kirby AIA were made principals alongside Schaefer and Schirmer.

In 1976 Schaefer and Schirmer dissolved their partnership after nineteen years. Schaefer reorganized the Wichita office as Schaefer & Associates PA and Schirmer continued the Topeka office as a sole proprietorship. Over the next decade Schaefer completed major projects including the Mid-America All-Indian Center (1976) in Wichita and the Kansas Museum of History (1984) in Topeka. In 1984 Joseph A. Johnson AIA, Kenton L. Cox AIA and J. Samuel Frey AIA were made principals and the firm was renamed Schaefer, Johnson, Cox, Frey & Associates. Schaefer retired from his leadership role in 1993 but continued in a consulting role for over a decade.

Schaefer joined the American Institute of Architects (AIA) in 1957 as a member of AIA Kansas. He was elected a Fellow of the AIA in 1981. His former partner Schirmer was also elected a Fellow in that year.

== Legacy ==
The firms led by Schaefer were frequently the recipient of design awards by AIA Kansas and other organizations. After 1993, Schaefer, Johnson, Cox, Frey & Associates was continued by Schaefer's fellow principals. It was renamed SJCF Architecture in 2011 and Schaefer Architecture in 2023. Later works of this firm include Exploration Place (2000), designed with lead architect Moshe Safdie.

In 2018, the Wichita Central Library was superseded as Wichita's main library by the Advanced Learning Library, leaving the old building vacant and vulnerable to demolition. As part of an effort to preserve the building, it was listed on the United States National Register of Historic Places in 2020. The same year, the work of Schaefer, Schirmer & Eflin was the subject of an essay in the Regional Spotlight series of Docomomo US. The city has since solicited bids for the reuse of the library, but as of 2024 its future is undetermined.

== Personal life ==
Schaefer was married in 1949 to Yvonne Wooley, and they had three children, one son and two daughters. He was a parishioner and elder of the Eastminster Presbyterian Church in Wichita, the building of which he completed in 1966. In later life Schaefer suffered from Parkinson's disease. He died April 26, 2006, in Lawrence at the age of 81.

== Architectural works ==
=== Schaefer, Schirmer & Eflin, 1960–1971 ===
- 1963 – Wichita Art Museum additions, (Note: Demolished.) 1400 Museum Blvd, Wichita, Kansas
- 1964 – Grace Memorial Chapel, Wichita State University, Wichita, Kansas
- 1965 – Wichita Collegiate School, 9115 E 13th St N, Wichita, Kansas
- 1966 – Eastminster Presbyterian Church, 1958 N Webb Rd, Wichita, Kansas
- 1966 – Skyline High School, 20269 W Highway 54, Pratt, Kansas
- 1967 – Butler Community College campus, El Dorado, Kansas
- 1967 – Wichita Central Library (former), (Note: NRHP-listed.) 223 S Main St, Wichita, Kansas
- 1968 – United States Post Office, 330 West 2nd St N, Wichita, Kansas
- 1969 – Allen Community College campus, Iola, Kansas
- 1969 – Cessna Aircraft Company engineering and development center, 5800 E Pawnee St, Wichita, Kansas
- 1969 – Hesston High School, 200 N Ridge Rd, Hesston, Kansas
- 1969 – Schaefer, Schirmer & Eflin office building, 200 S Hillside St, Wichita, Kansas (demolished)
- 1969 – Seward County Community College campus, Liberal, Kansas
- 1970 – Pizza Hut headquarters (former), 10225 E Kellogg Dr, Wichita, Kansas
- 1971 – Chaparral High School, 467 N KS-14, Anthony, Kansas

=== Schaefer, Schirmer & Associates PA, 1972–1976 ===
- 1973 – Panhandle Credit Union building, 403 N Washington Ave, Wellington, Kansas
- 1976 – Peoples National Bank building, 201 S 4th St, Burlington, Kansas
- 1976 – Wallace Hall, Wichita State University, Wichita, Kansas

=== Schaefer & Associates PA, 1976–1984 ===
- 1976 – Mid-America All-Indian Center, 650 N Seneca St, Wichita, Kansas
- 1978 – Wichita Northwest High School, 1220 N Tyler Rd, Wichita, Kansas
- 1979 – Schaefer & Associates PA office building, 220 S Hillside St, Wichita, Kansas
- 1981 – Tallgrass Country Club clubhouse, 2400 N Tallgrass St, Wichita, Kansas
- 1984 – Kansas Museum of History, 6425 SW 6th Ave, Topeka, Kansas

=== Schaefer, Johnson, Cox, Frey & Associates PA, from 1984 ===
- 1986 – Wiedemann Hall, Wichita State University, Wichita, Kansas
