= Delano, Wichita, Kansas =

Delano
- Neighborhood
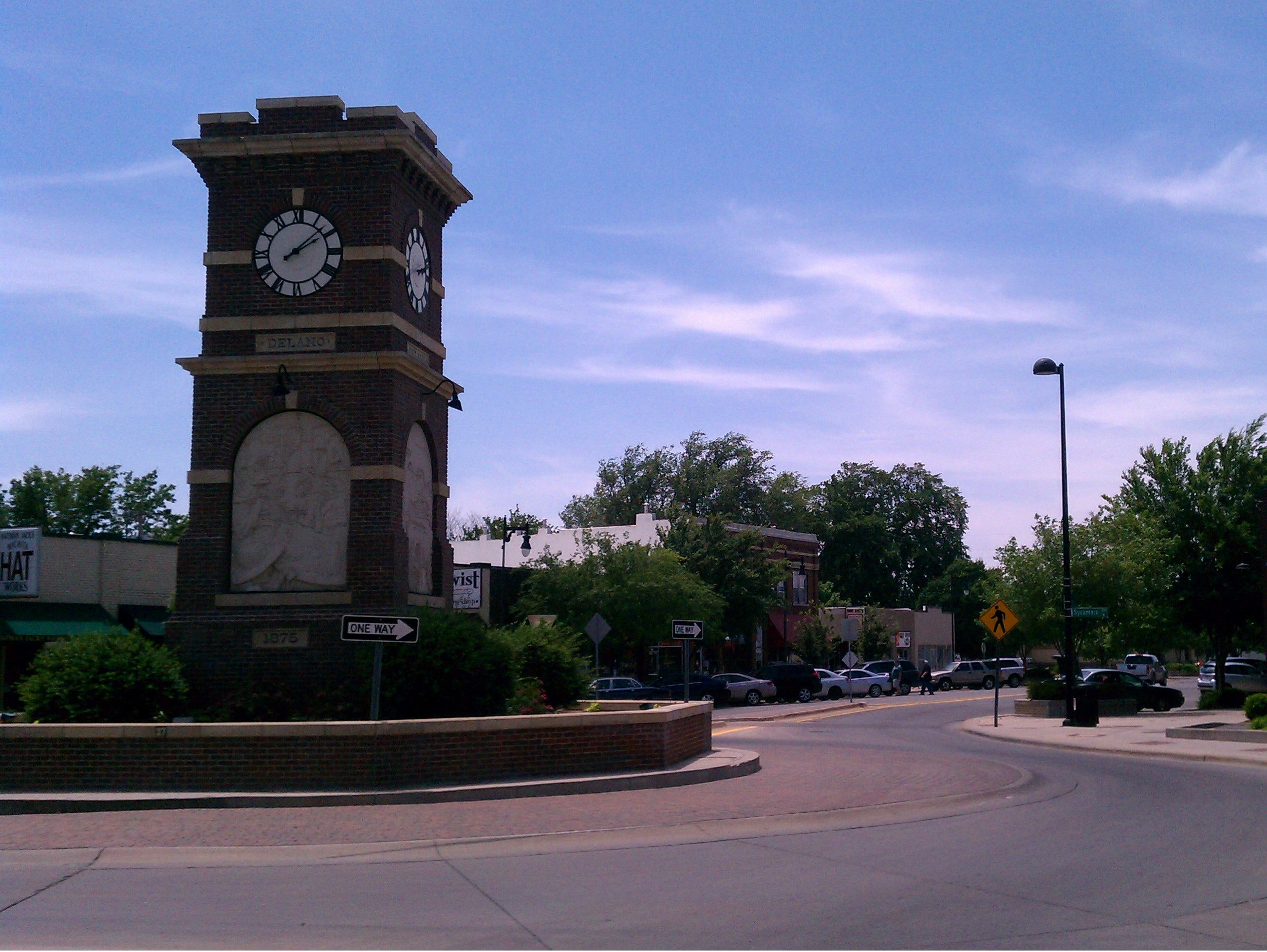
- The Delano Clock Tower (2012)
- Interactive map of Delano
- Coordinates: 37°40′58″N 97°21′35″W
- Country: United States
- State: Kansas
- County: Sedgwick
- City: Wichita
- Platted: 18?? (Elgin); 1871 (Delano); 1880 (West Wichita)
- Elevation: 1,299 ft (396 m)

Population (2016)
  - Total: 5,479
- Demonym: Delanonians
- ZIP code: 67203, 67213
- Area code: 316

Delano is a neighborhood located in Wichita, Kansas, United States. A mixed commercial and residential area on the west bank of the Arkansas River, it is home to Friends University, Equity Bank Park, and Exploration Place, the Sedgwick County science museum.

== History ==
Thanks to the availability of inexpensive land under the Homestead Act of 1862, settlers purchased land across the Arkansas River from Wichita, Kansas. These settlers named their new community Elgin. In 1870, Elgin became a cattle shipment point on the Chisholm Trail and began to grow. In March 1871, local residents renamed the town Delano after Columbus Delano, Secretary of the Interior under President Ulysses S. Grant. Hotels, saloons, and other new businesses opened over the next two years along with a post office and a toll bridge across the river to Wichita. Unlike Wichita, Delano had no law enforcement. As a result, it became an area center of drinking, gambling, and prostitution for cowboys working in the cattle trade. Gunfights occurred as well, including a fatal and locally famous incident between two saloon keepers in 1873. In the late 1870s, the cattle trade relocated west to Dodge City, and Delano’s period as a rowdy cowtown ended.

Wichita annexed Delano in 1880, and it became locally known as West Wichita. An economic boom a few years later triggered residential development. Streets in the neighborhood were named after prominent settlers. New businesses opened as well, including a watch factory. Garfield University, later repurposed as Friends University, opened in Delano in 1887. By the end of the decade, however, the city had entered an economic recession, and many locals went bankrupt.

Development returned in the early 1900s with renewed growth in manufacturing and the oil industry. In the 1920s, Wichita became a center of aircraft manufacturing, and several companies opened facilities in Delano. These included Travel Air in 1925 and Cessna in 1927 as well as smaller companies such as the Wichita Blue Streak Motor Company, Hilton Aircraft, and Yunker Aircraft Company. By the 1930s, the majority of Delano consisted of modest residential property built during the preceding three decades.

In the early 1930s, the Ackerman Island sandbar located in the middle of the Arkansas River was moved westward to become the west bank of the current river. The former baseball stadium on Ackerman Island was razed, so a new baseball field was built, Lawrence Athletic Field, later Lawrence–Dumont Stadium, which opened in Delano in 1934. That same year, the city government had the Ben F. McLean Memorial Fountain built in the neighborhood to commemorate McLean, a former mayor.

In the 1950s and 60s, businesses and retailers began to leave the neighborhood since the aircraft industry relocated elsewhere in the city. By the 1990s, the area had entered a period of modest decline. In 1999 and 2000, neighborhood organizations and the city government collaborated to develop and implement a revitalization plan, including infrastructure investment and new business development. Since, Delano’s business district has become a booming local shopping and entertainment area marketed as the Historic Delano District.

In November 2018, the city government had Lawrence-Dumont Stadium demolished. Construction of its replacement, Equity Bank Park, began soon thereafter and finished in August 2019.

== Geography ==
Delano is located at 37°40′58″N 97°21′35″W (37.682778, -97.359722) at an elevation of 1,299 feet (396 m). The Arkansas River forms its northern and eastern boundary, U.S. Route 54 its southern boundary, and Meridian Avenue its western boundary. Located across the river west from Downtown Wichita, Delano borders the neighborhoods of McCormick to the south and Sunflower to the west, while Riverside lies across the river to the north.

== Government ==
For the purposes of representation on the Wichita City Council, Delano is split between Districts 4 (southwest Wichita) in the south half and 6 (near northwest Wichita) in the north

For the purposes of representation in the Kansas Legislature, Delano is located in the 25th district of the Kansas Senate, represented by Democrat Mary Ware, and the 95th district of the Kansas House of Representatives, represented by Democrat Tom Sawyer, the minority leader in the state house.

== Education ==
=== Primary and secondary education ===
Wichita Public Schools operates two facilities in Delano: Allison Traditional Magnet Middle School and Franklin Elementary School.

The Roman Catholic Diocese of Wichita oversees one Catholic elementary school in the neighborhood, St. Joseph School.

Northfield School of the Liberal Arts is located in Delano. It teaches sixth through twelfth grades.

=== Colleges and universities ===
The main campus of Friends University, a private, non-denominational Christian university, is located in Delano.

=== Libraries ===
The Advanced Learning Library, the central facility of the Wichita Public Library, is located on West Second Street in Delano.

== Parks and recreation ==
The Wichita Department of Park and Recreation maintains three parks in Delano: Delano Park, Seneca Park, and the West Side Athletic Field. Delano Park is a small park on the west bank of the Arkansas River at the intersection of McLean Boulevard and Douglas Avenue. It is the site of a historical marker marking the location of the Chisholm Trail as well as a lighted fountain built in honor of Ben F. McLean, a former mayor of Wichita. Seneca Park, a 2-acre (0.81 ha) neighborhood park on South Seneca Street, has tennis courts and a playground. The 24.83-acre (10.05 ha) West Side Athletic Field on North McLean Boulevard includes tennis courts and baseball fields available for public use.

== Culture ==
=== Points of interest ===
- Delano Clock Tower
- Exploration Place
- Equity Bank Park
- Wichita Ice Center

== Transportation ==
Douglas Avenue is the primary east-west street through Delano; Seneca is the primary north-south street. Other arterial roads include: Maple Street, which runs east-west a few blocks south of Douglas; Meridian Avenue, which runs north-south along the western edge of the neighborhood; and McLean Boulevard, which runs along the west bank of the Arkansas River. U.S. Route 54 runs east-west along the southern edge of the neighborhood as the Kellogg Avenue freeway, accessible via interchanges at Sycamore Street, Seneca, and Meridian.

Several Wichita Transit bus routes service Delano including the 11, 12, 14, and 15 routes. The Delano/Old Town and Douglas routes of the free Q-Line trolley also service the neighborhood.

Kansas and Oklahoma Railroad operates a freight rail line which enters Delano from the northwest and exits to the southwest.

== Gallery ==
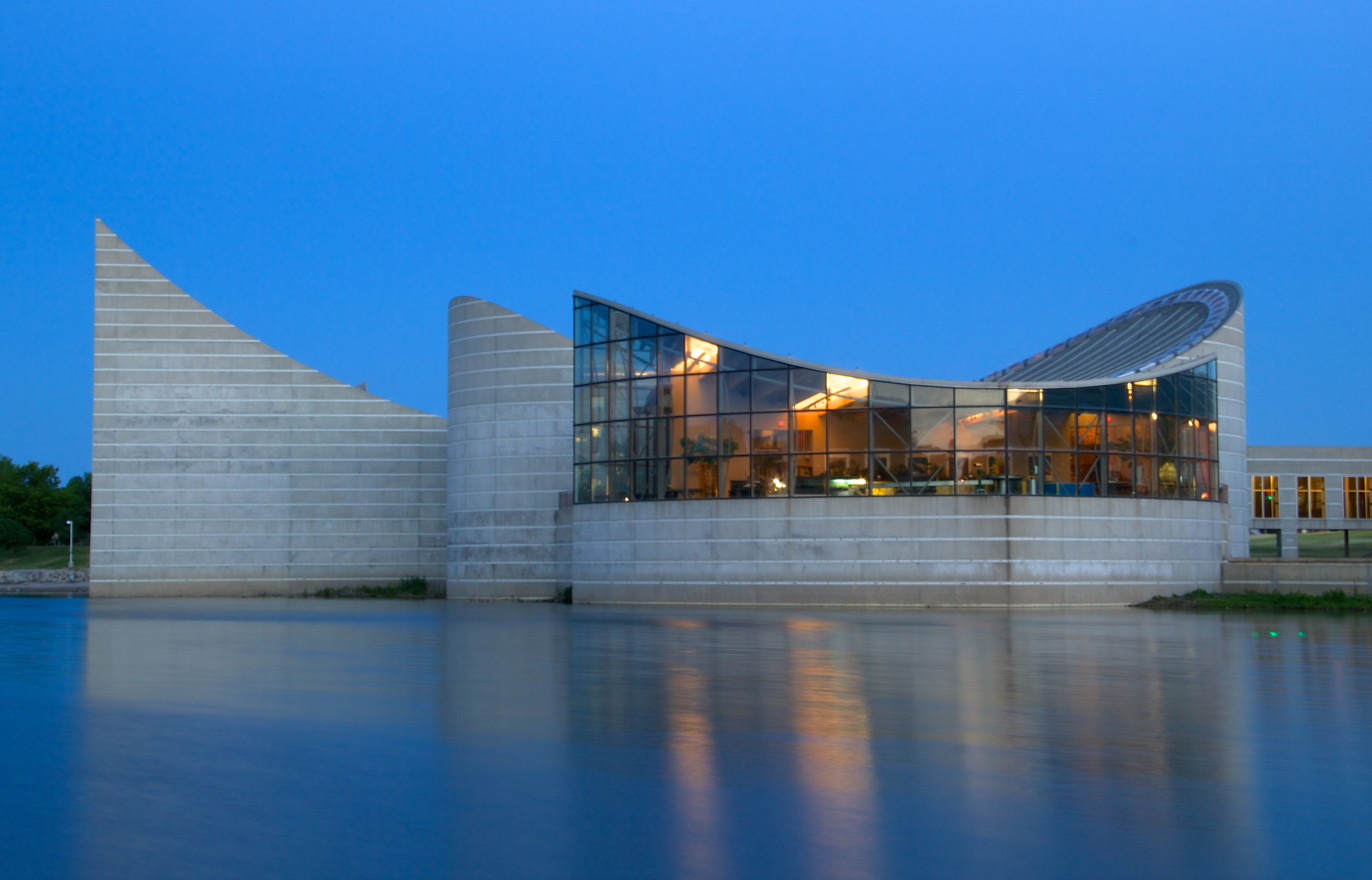
Exploration Place science museum (2013)

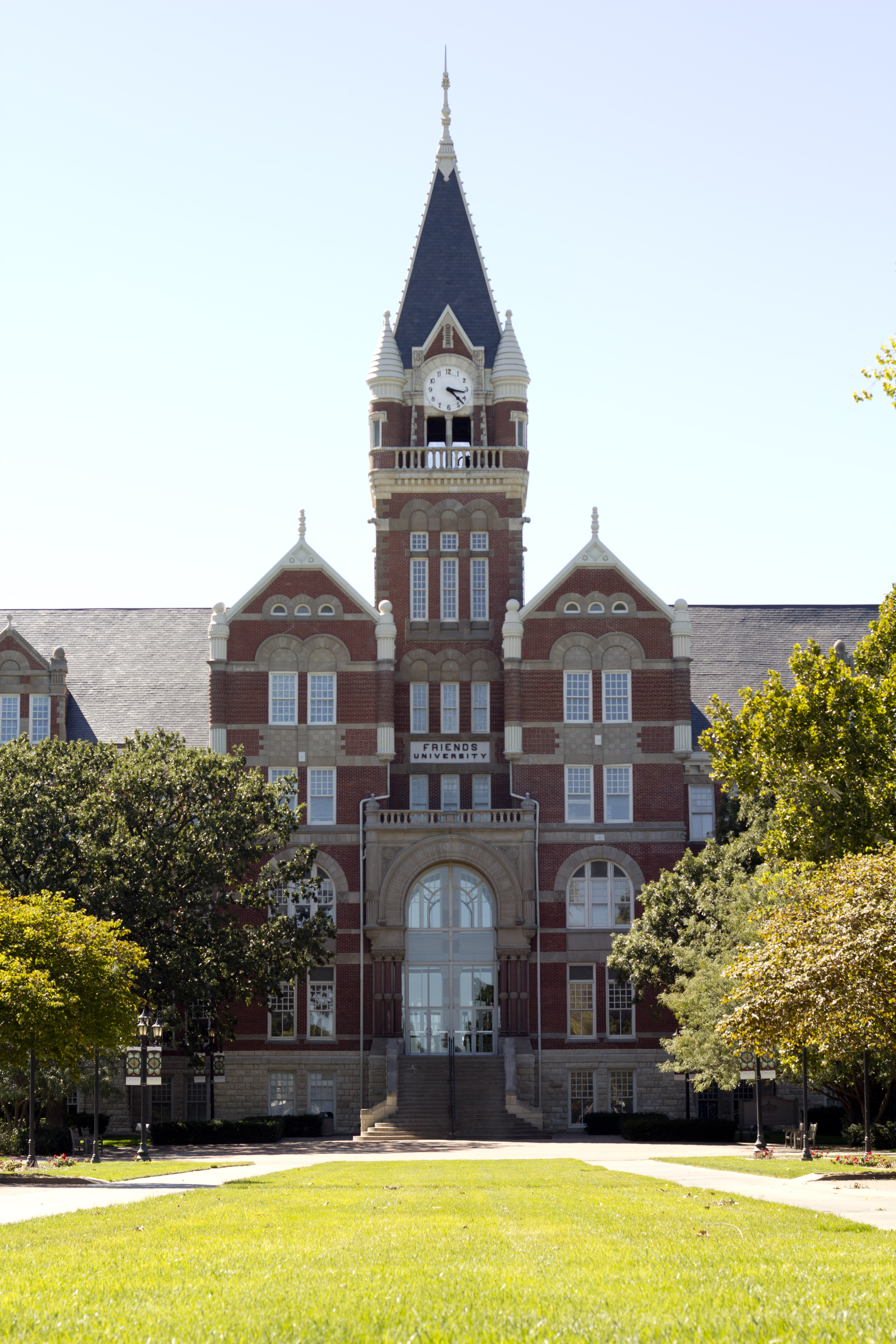
University Hall at Friends University (2012)

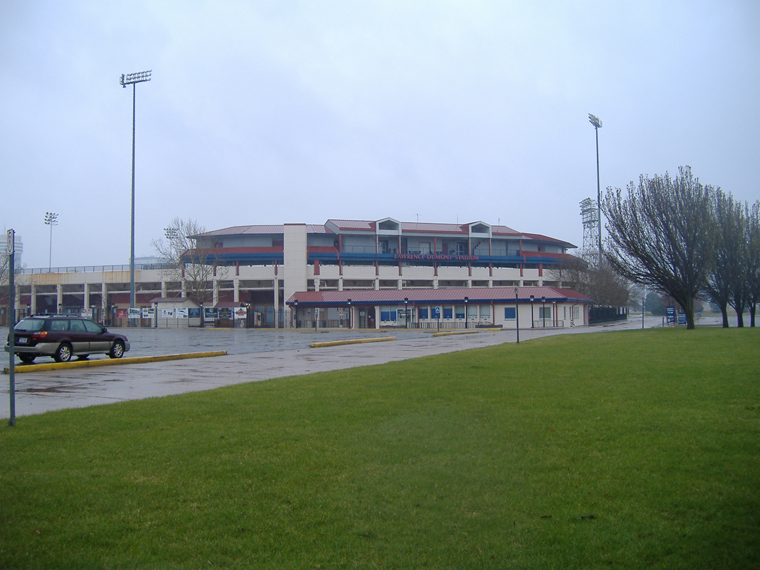
Lawrence-Dumont Stadium (2009)

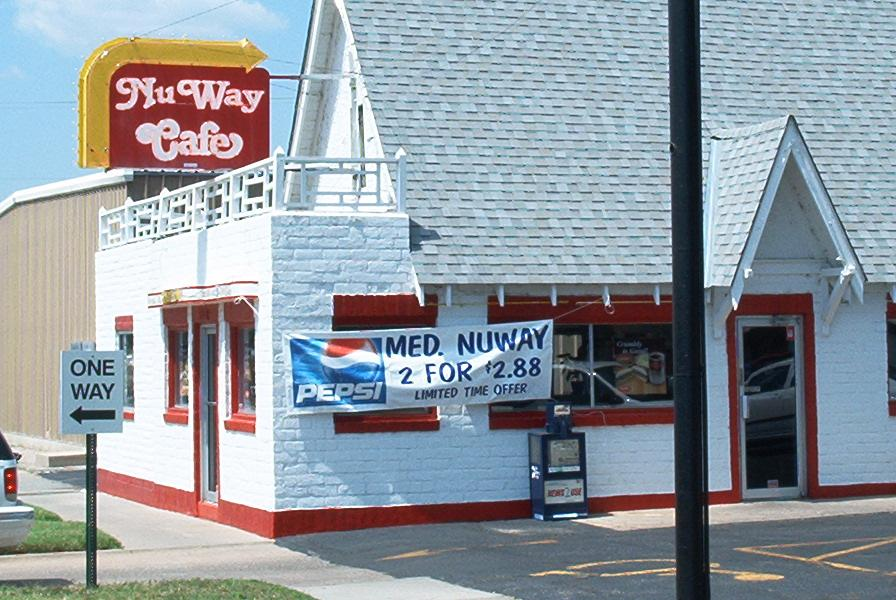
The original Nu Way Cafe (2007)
