= Mid-America All-Indian Center =

Mid-America All-Indian Museum

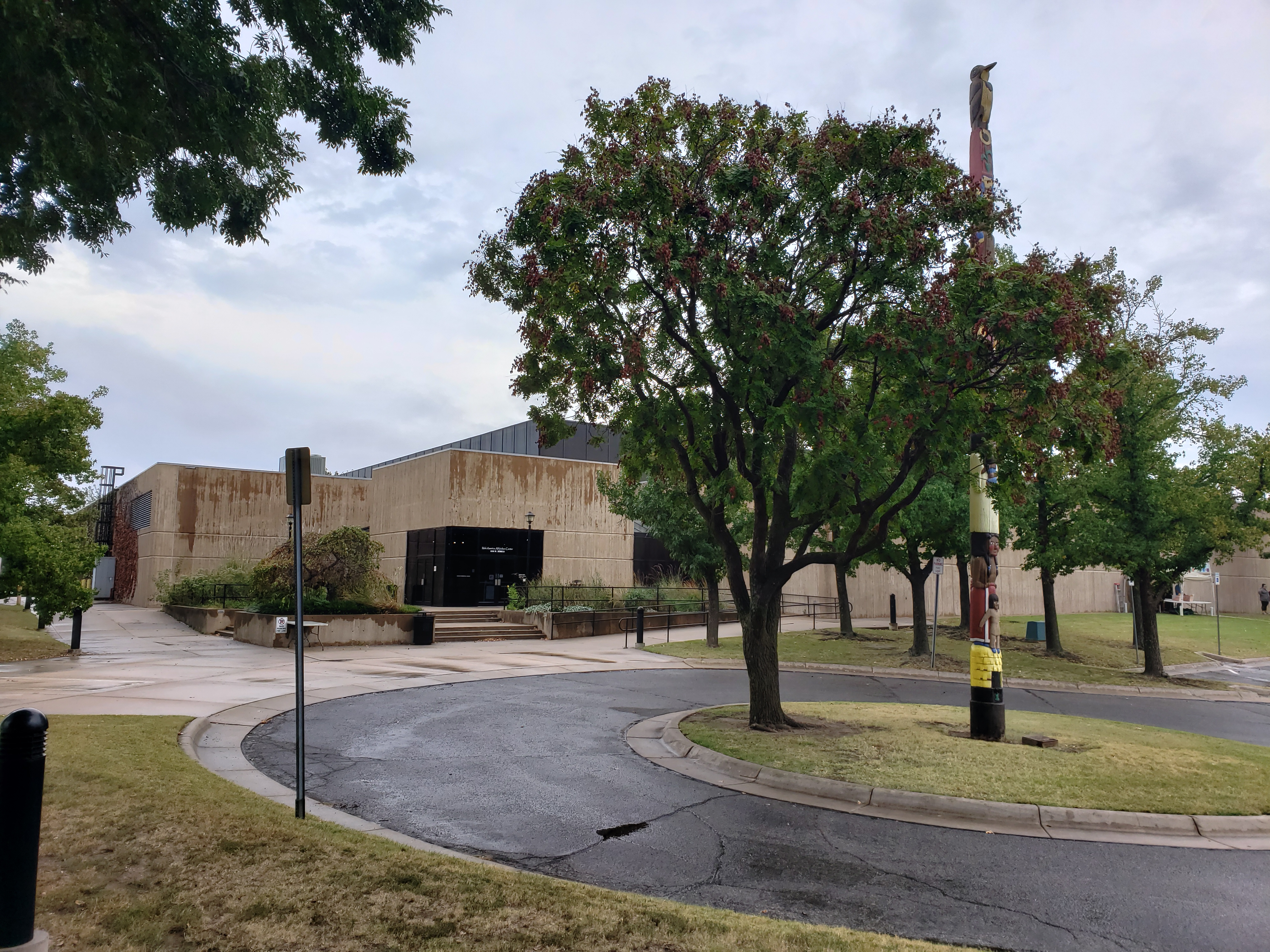

- Location within Kansas
- Former name: Mid-America All-Indian Center
- Established: 1976
- Location: 650 North Seneca Street, Wichita, KS 67203 USA
- Coordinates: 37°41′32″N 97°21′7″W
- Director: Candy Taylor
- Curator: Erin Raux
- Employees: Kaleigh Huxley, Education Coordinator
- Website: theindianmuseum.org

The Mid-America All-Indian Museum is an American museum dedicated to the history and culture of Native Americans. The museum, which is located along the Arkansas River in the Riverside neighborhood of Wichita, Kansas, is considered the only facility solely dedicated to American Indian culture in the U.S. state of Kansas.

== Mission and collection ==
The goal of the Mid-America All-Indian Museum (MAAIM) is to educate the community about the art, culture and heritage of American Indians while recognizing the important role they play in today's society.

The museum's collection includes the largest publicly displayed body of artwork by Blackbear Bosin, the late Kiowa-Comanche sculptor and painter. Bosin's most recognizable work is the Keeper of the Plains, which is sited on a plaza behind the museum, at the confluence of the Arkansas and Little Arkansas rivers. Other notable pieces in the MAAIM collection include beadwork, pipe bags, jewelry, pottery, and baskets. The museum has a large collection of Alaska Native artwork from the mid-20th century, as well as flags from over 70 American Indian tribes displayed in the Gallery of Nations event space.

== History ==
The Mid-America All-Indian Center opened in 1976, and was established as a cultural center and provider of social services to the Native American community. The original co-founders of the museum included Betty Nixon, a Kiowa artisan who later served as the chairwoman of the center's board of directors. The building was designed by Schaefer & Associates PA, local architects. The Mid-America All-Indian Center's social services were later abolished, as similar programs could be provided more easily by other agencies, such as the Salvation Army or United Way of the Plains.

Jerry Martin, the former director of the Lowell D. Holmes Museum of Anthropology at Wichita State University, was the museum's director from 1989 to 1999.

In 2005, the Mid-America All-Indian Center building came under the purview of the City of Wichita, with the goal of trimming costs and restructuring. Staffing was reduced to three full-time employees, including an executive director, curator and education director.

City officials also commissioned a new inventory of all artifacts housed at the Mid-America All-Indian Center. The collection was recorded, photographed and digitized. The museum's computer database were upgraded and modernized for better record keeping. In 2022, the name was changed from Mid-American All-Indian Center to Museum, to reflect the facility's shift from a social service facility to a cultural heritage site.

The Mid-America All-Indian Museum now has an operating budget of approximately $440,000, as of 2012, with roughly 40,000 visitors per year. It brings in additional income from the rental of its entertainment and meeting spaces. The museum serves as a cultural center for the 10,000 American Indians residing in the Wichita metropolitan area, who represent seventy-two unique tribes from the Plains and other areas. The center hosts powwows and other cultural events.
