= Wichita Bus Station =

Intercity bus station in Wichita, Kansas

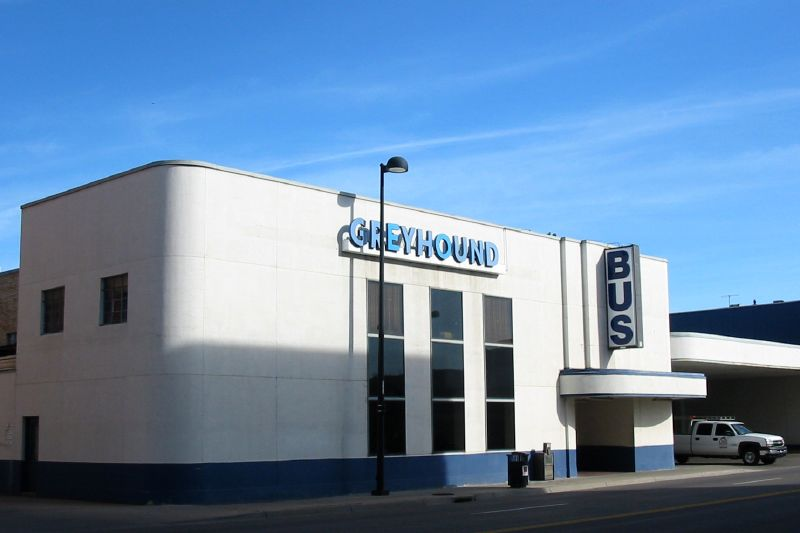
- The 1947 station in 2006

General information
- Location: 207 S. Sycamore Ave., Wichita, Kansas
- Coordinates: 37.682426°N 97.347424°W
- Operator: Wichita Transit
- Bus stands: 12
- Bus operators: Greyhound Lines; Beeline Express
- Connections: Wichita Transit

Construction
- Parking: 425 spaces

Other information
- Website: Official website

History
- Opened: November 21, 1947
- Rebuilt: June 6, 2026
Location

The Wichita Bus Station is an intercity bus station and transit center situated in the Delano neighborhood of Wichita, Kansas. The station, managed by Wichita Transit, also serves Greyhound Lines and the Beeline Express. The current bus station replaced a 1993 transit center.

Wichita has seen intercity bus transit since at least 1925, when a union bus depot opened at 216 East 1st Street. Later stations included a Union Bus Depot at 120 South Broadway and a Santa Fe Trailways depot at 312 South Broadway, which would serve Greyhound until 2017. Since that time, intercity bus services have utilized the local transit centers.

== Attributes ==
The current transit center and bus station building sits on the block bounded by South Sycamore Street, South Oak Street, West Texas Avenue, and West Burton Avenue. The site is located in the Delano neighborhood, just west of downtown Wichita. The main entrance is located on South Sycamore Street. The bus station is owned by Wichita Transit, but also serves Greyhound Lines and Beeline Express.

== History ==
=== Early stations ===
The first bus station in Wichita opened April 20, 1925 at 216 East 1st Street. The depot was owned and operated by Southern Kansas Stage Line Inc. The company had seen great success opening the first bus station in the state in Wellington, and wished to emulate that in Wichita. The depot was a remodeled in-a-door bed company and included an on-site filling station. On May 1st, buses no longer made any stops at hotels and 26 buses departed daily.

However, this station would soon be outgrown, and a new union station was planned for the corner of South Broadway and East William. The new station opened December 12, 1934 with music, dancing and entertainment to celebrate. This location, at 120 South Broadway, originally served Santa Fe Trail System, Southern Kansas Stage Lines, and Cardinal Stage Lines. In 1939, this depot saw over 100 daily departures.

Within 13 years this depot too would be replaced. Santa Fe Trailways commissioned a new depot at 314 South Broadway that would be three times as large at a cost of $300,000. Construction was undertaken by A.W. Soderberg Construction with a grand opening on November 21, 1947. The Wichita Eagle claimed it was one of the finest in the country, and one of the few with separate bays for incoming and outgoing buses. At 12 bus bays, the depot held almost twice as many as the previous. On the outside, the depot used cream-colored brick and structural glass to create a modernistic feel. A large neon winged insignia sign indicated the station's presence to travelers.

The inside was similarly impressive, with brown and ivory tile and terrazzo floors. A chicken restaurant, PA system and air conditioning made for a comfortable experience. Three ticket windows served the passengers to 106 daily scheduled buses.

Greyhound took over this station when it absorbed Continental Trailways in 1987. By the 2010s, the cost of maintaining the Santa Fe Trailways depot at 312 S. Broadway was becoming too much for Greyhound. In 2017, Greyhound relocated to Wichita Transit's transit center two blocks to the northeast at 214 S. Topeka. Greyhound's lease was $24,000 annually for 10 years plus a quarter of utilities. This transit center was opened on July 28, 1993. The style was described as a "psychedelic White Castle hamburger stand" and included a mural called "Kansas Daydreaming".

After standing vacant for three years, the Santa Fe Trailways depot was purchased by SPT Architecture to serve as offices. The depot was restored and reopened in 2021 with the former bus bays being converted to covered parking.

=== Current station ===
In 2026, Wichita Transit relocated to a new transit center, leaving intercity buses as the sole occupants of the 1993 transit center.

On October 11, 2024, the city broke ground on a new $26 million transit center named "The Hub" in the Delano neighborhood. Upon opening on June 6, 2026, the facility replaced the 1993 downtown transit center, which is intended to be redeveloped. The new facility features 12 bus bays, a 425-space parking garage, EV chargers, transit offices, and a ticket window and lobby. Intercity buses continued to serve the old 19-bay transit center until late summer despite the broken connection to local transit. Greyhound began serving the new terminal on August 17.

== See also ==
- Wichita Transit
