= Kansas Museum of History =

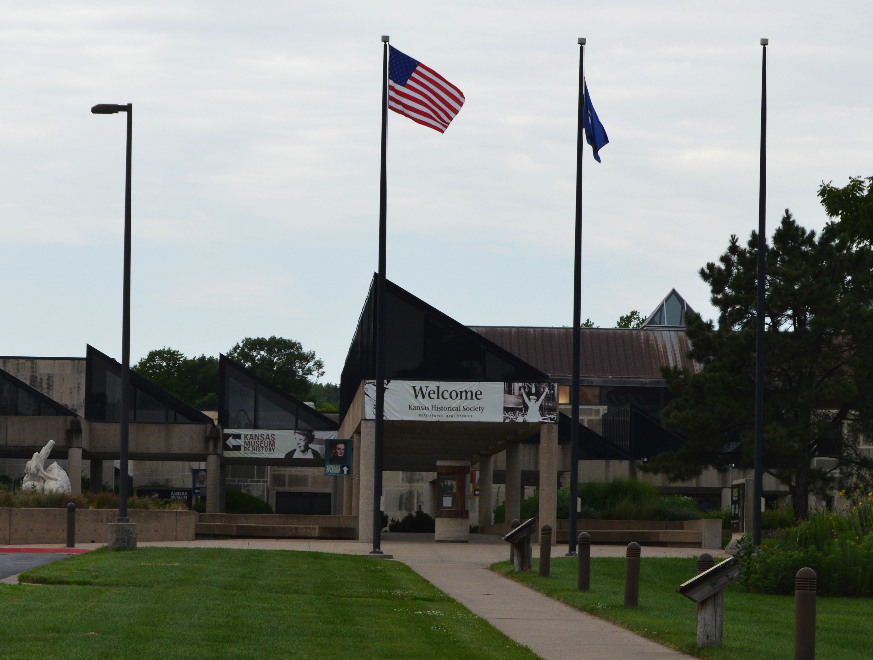
- Entrance (2015)

- Location within Kansas Kansas Museum of History (the United States)
- Established: 1984
- Location: 6425 SW 6th Avenue; Topeka, Kansas 66615
- Coordinates: 39°3′22″N 95°46′33″W
- Type: State historical museum
- Accreditation: American Alliance of Museums
- Owner: Kansas Historical Society
- Website: Museum website

The Kansas Museum of History is the state historical museum in Topeka, Kansas, United States. It presents Kansas history from the prehistoric to modern eras in 30,000 square feet (2,800 m^{2}) of exhibits. The galleries feature a train (Atchison, Topeka and Santa Fe locomotive with two cars), full-sized tipi in the Southern Cheyenne style, a 1950s diner, and many other large features. Major topics covered in the main gallery include Native American tribal history, westward movement on the Oregon and Santa Fe trails, early settlers, the Bleeding Kansas and Civil War eras, and Populism at the turn of the 20th century.

== History ==
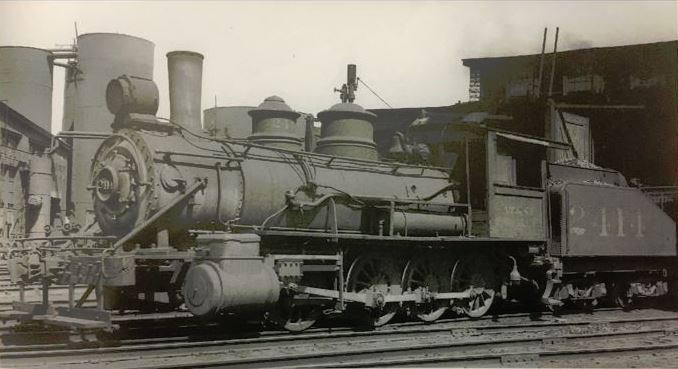
Atchison, Topeka & Santa Fe Railway #132 (which had been renumbered ATSF 2414), near the end of its service life in the 20th century, before restoration.

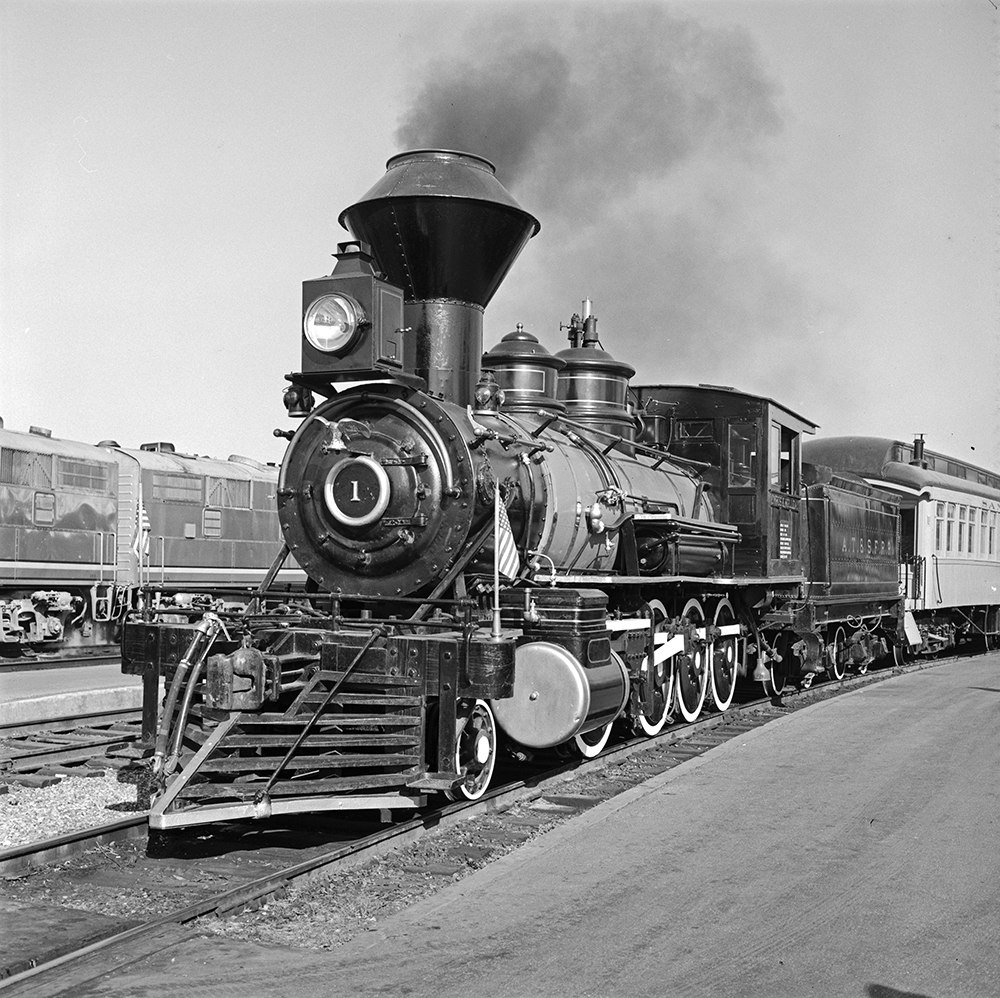
ATSF 132, after restoration and renaming it ATSF 1, the "Cyrus K. Holliday," after the railroad's founder. The railroad donated the engine to the museum where it is now on display. The restoration included many of the engine's 1800s engineering elements such as a diamond stack, box headlight and wooden pilot (cowcatcher).

The museum is a division of the Kansas Historical Society, which was founded in 1875 by Kansas newspaper editors and publishers. Its first home was in the Kansas State Capitol.

The current museum building was built in the 1980s to house the Society's object collections and exhibits. Dubbed the Kansas Museum of History, it opened in 1984 at an 80-acre (320,000 m^{2}) site in west Topeka near the historic Potawatomi Mission. In addition to galleries, the building also houses a museum store, classrooms, and labs for conservation and exhibit fabrication.

The museum building was designed by Schaefer & Associates PA, Wichita architects.

In the mid-1990s, the rest of the Society's divisions moved to the new Center for Historical Research adjacent to the museum. Today the complex includes nature trails, an education and conference center, and a historic one-room school used for educational programs.

The museum's most popular programs include its changing exhibits schedule, the Cool Things section of the website (featuring interesting objects from the collections), and the related Cool Things podcasts.

In September 2022, the Kansas Museum of History closed for a renovation, which was originally supposed to be completed in early 2024. Afterward, it took several months to remove 2,500 to 3,000 artifacts from the building. The project included adding a new ramp and moving the special-exhibit area, and the galleries were rearranged based on theme, rather than the original chronological format. The Kansas Historical Society raised about $6 million to fund the renovation, but the project was delayed because another $904,000 was needed to pay for engineering costs. The museum's reopening was subsequently postponed to November 2025.

== Original galleries ==
The museum gallery sections were formerly grouped by chronological order:

- 5000 b.c. to 1820 a.d. - Early People.
- 1820 to 1860 a.d. - Trails.
- 1861 to 1865 a.d. - Civil War.
- 1865 to 1880 a.d. - Settling the Frontier.
- 1880 to 1900 a.d. - Trains and Towns.
- 1900 to 1940 a.d. - Early 20th Century.
- 1940 to 1990 a.d. - Recent Past.
- Special Exhibits.

Important exhibited objects include:

- John Brown's pike.
- William Quantrill's flag.
- George Armstrong Custer's riding boots.
- Carrie A. Nation's hammer.
- William Allen White's printing press.
- Dwight D. Eisenhower's World War II field jacket.

The museum's collection includes a steam locomotive and a log cabin. The museum also holds one of the United States' largest collections of Civil War flags from African American regiments. At least one of these flags is always on display in the main gallery.

== 2025 renovation ==
The Kansas Museum of History underwent a six million dollar renovation which, after three years of being closed, opened to the public on November 22, 2025. The primary change was going from chronological to thematic exhibits, organizing the information under bigger ideas. The museum starts with asking "What is Kansas?" before moving on to Bleeding Kansas, Making Kansas, Changing Kansas, Connecting Kansas, and the Future of Kansas. Within these galleries are exhibits that walk through the complexities of how Kansas became the state it is today and what it means for the future. Many of the new exhibits also feature the histories of minority groups. The museum worked with the tribal nations present in Kansas to tell a more accurate story of their experiences as well.

Many of the artifacts from the original museum remain, but as with most museums, the Kansas Historical Society's collections are significantly larger than what is able to be on display at once, so elements have been rotated, added, or stowed away. One highlight is a new mural by Stan Herd, which includes many motifs that reference important people, objects, and events in Kansas history.

The redesign was completed in partnership with Dimensional Innovations, an experience design firm located in Overland Park, Kansas. Sculptural elements were also completed by Blue Rhino Studio based out of Eagan, Minnesota.

== Awards and honors ==
The Kansas Museum of History's main gallery and changing exhibits have won numerous Awards of Merit, the highest honor bestowed by the American Association for State and Local History. The museum is accredited by the American Alliance of Museums.

== See also ==
- List of museums in Kansas
- History of Kansas
