= The Keeper of the Plains =

1974 sculpture in Kansas, United States

- Drone view of Keeper of the Plains, looking northwest (2025)
- Interactive map of The Keeper of the Plains
- Location: Wichita, Kansas
- Coordinates: 37°41′29″N 97°20′59″W
- Designer: Blackbear Bosin
- Type: Sculpture
- Material: Weathering steel
- Height: 44 ft (13 m)
- Completion date: 1974

The Keeper of the Plains is a 13.4 metres (44 ft) Cor-Ten steel sculpture by Kiowa-Comanche artist Blackbear Bosin. It stands at the confluence of the Arkansas and Little Arkansas rivers in Wichita, Kansas, adjacent to the Mid-America All-Indian Center. Surrounding the base of the statue are multiple displays which describe the local tribes that used to inhabit the area, as well as several fire pits which are sometimes lit to illuminate the statue at night. The fire pits, which are known as the Rings of Fire, are lit manually for public safety and run in 15-minute increments. They are generally lit once a night around 7 pm during the winter and at sunset during the summer.

== History ==
The sculpture, commissioned by the city and private organizations to mark the United States Bicentennial, was erected in 1974. It has since become one of Wichita's most recognized and beloved symbols. A spring/summer 2006 project elevated the sculpture on a 30-foot rock promontory so it could be seen from farther away.

A profile image of this statue comprises the motif adopted by the 22nd Air Refueling Wing, a U.S. Air Force flying unit which is based at nearby McConnell Air Force Base. From 1993 through 2004, an image of the statue, along with the words "Keeper of the Plains," appeared on the tails of Boeing KC-135 air refueling tankers assigned to the 22nd ARW.

== In popular culture and the arts ==
The Keeper of the Plains was mentioned by Christian musician Rich Mullins in his 1991 song "Calling Out Your Name".

On March 11, 2021, a photo of the statue was shown as part of a clue on U.S. landmarks on Jeopardy!.

== Gallery ==
Keeper of the Plains in December, 2010 at night. View from the banks of the Arkansas River, with the "Ring of Fire" aflame.

Keeper of the Plains in December, 2010. View from the banks of the Little Arkansas River.

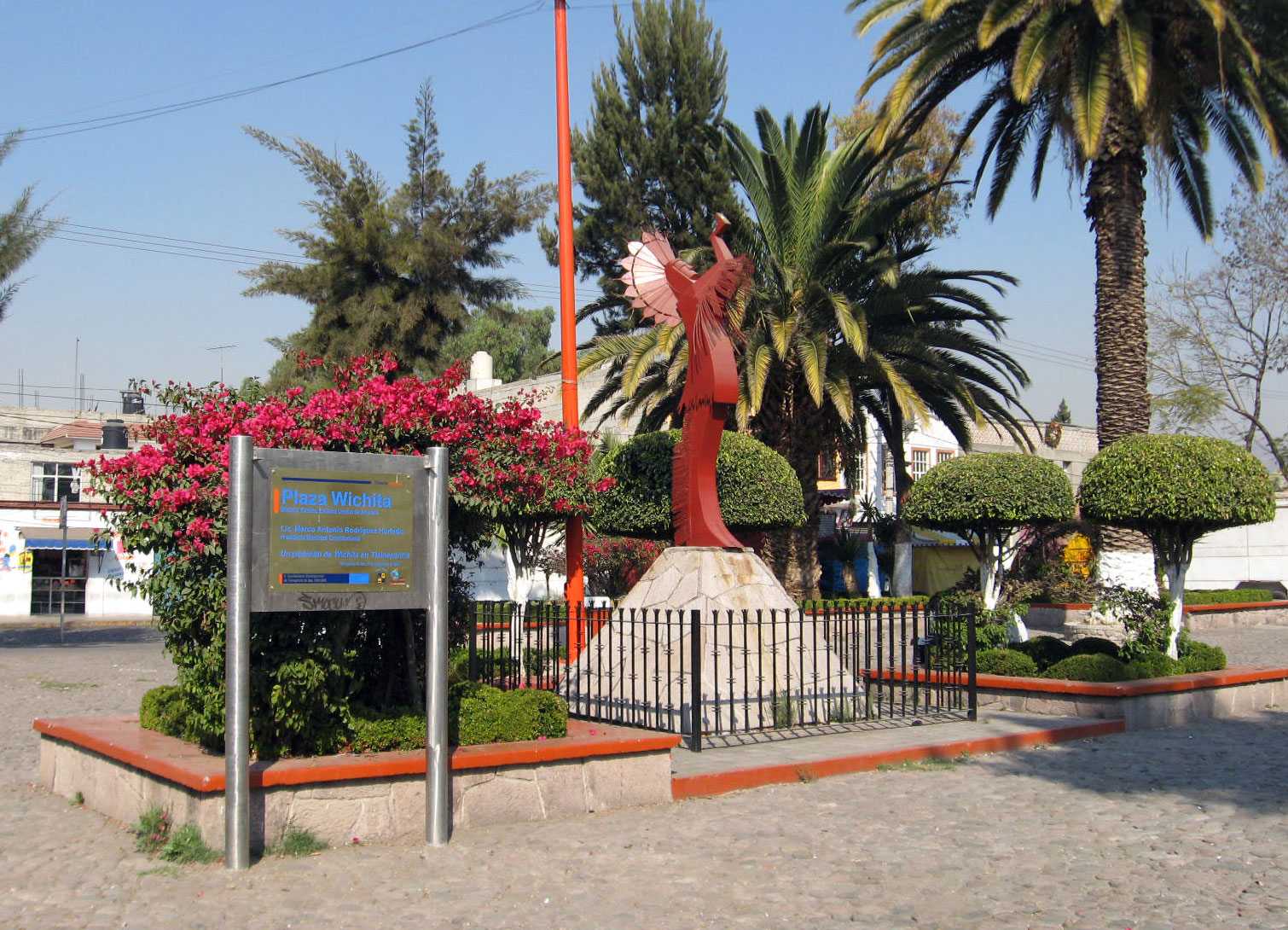
Copy of the statue donated by Wichita to Tlalnepantla, Mexico, a sister city of Wichita.

== See also ==
- List of the tallest statues in the United States
