= Wichita Central Library =

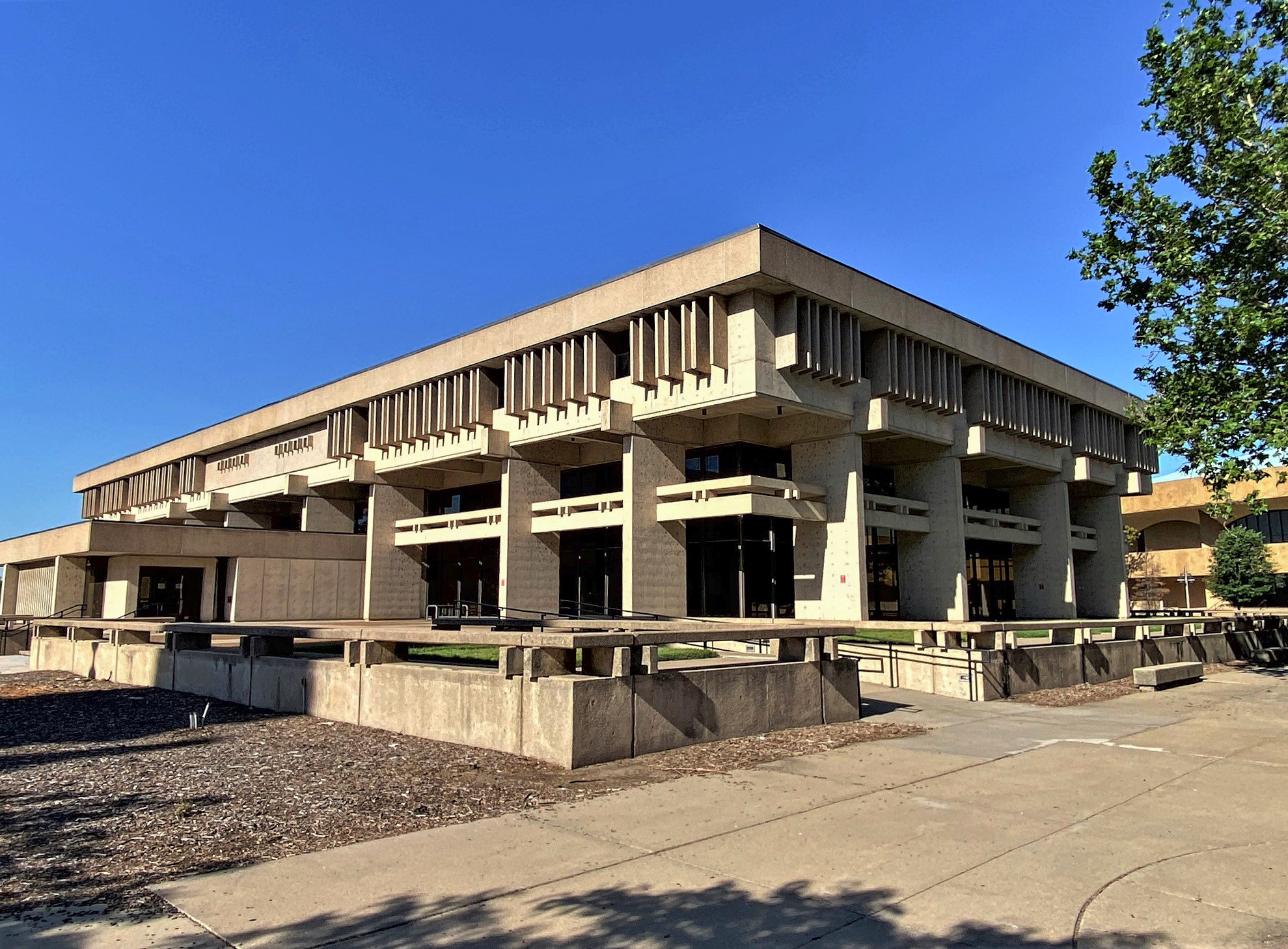
- Interactive map of the Wichita Central Library area

General information
- Architectural style: Brutalist
- Location: 223 S. Main Street, Wichita, Kansas
- Coordinates: 37.684330°N 97.338896°W
- Groundbreaking: 1965
- Opened: 1967
- Closed: 2018

Technical details
- Floor area: 90,000 sq ft (8,400 m^{2})

Design and construction
- Architecture firm: Schaefer, Schirmer & Eflin

U.S. National Register of Historic Places
- Designated: February 2020
- Reference no.: 100005629

The Wichita Central Library is a public library building in Downtown Wichita, Kansas. It operated from 1967 to 2018, replacing the Wichita City Carnegie Library Building and replaced by the Wichita Public Library system's Advanced Learning Library. It was listed on the National Register of Historic Places in 2020. The library is the first Brutalist-style building constructed in Kansas, and the first of the style in the state nominated to the National Register.

== Attributes ==
The library building was designed in the Brutalist style by Schaefer, Schirmer & Eflin. It was their breakthrough project, and the firm quickly became the most revered architects in Kansas. The Brutalist style was popular for public buildings in the 1960s, and became especially prominent with the construction of Boston City Hall around the same time as the library building. The structure is functional and plain, with a solidity to convey the importance of literacy. Its vertical beams resemble books on a shelf, reminding viewers of the building's purpose. Unlike many Brutalist buildings, a significant portion of the structure is made of glass, making the space inviting and open.

The cruciform-shaped building replaces the Wichita City Carnegie Library Building, still extant across Main Street. The Brutalist building has a four stories, including a basement, main level, mezzanine, and upper level. It has 90,000 square feet (8,400 m^{2}).

== History ==
The building was designed from 1962 to 1963 and constructed from 1965 to 1967. It won a design award from the American Institute of Architects and American Library Association in 1968.

By 2015, city officials began planning a new downtown library, calling the Brutalist facility too dated to meet the library's current operations. As of 2015, the building's fate was unclear. Proposals were released to demolish the library and adjacent Century II Performing Arts & Convention Center to create a separate new convention center and performing arts center. In 2020, city residents successfully nominated the building to the National Register of Historic Places, against the wishes of city officials and developers. The library is the first Brutalist-style building constructed in Kansas, and the first of the style in the state nominated to the National Register.

From February 2021 to April 2022, the building held a county-operated COVID-19 vaccine clinic.

== See also ==
- National Register of Historic Places listings in Sedgwick County, Kansas
