= Wichita Public Library =

Library system in Wichita, Kansas, United States

- Location: Wichita, Kansas
- Established: 1876
- Branches: 6

Access and use
- Population served: 353,878

Other information
- Budget: $10,381,263
- Director: Jaime Nix
- Employees: 144 (113.5 FTE)
- Website: wichitalibrary.org

The Wichita Public Library is the local public library system in Wichita, Kansas, United States. It consists of a central library located downtown and six branch locations distributed throughout the city.

== Locations ==
Four district/regional branches (Alford, Evergreen, Rockwell and Westlink) offer a mix of basic research tools and popular materials for education and entertainment, while the neighborhood branches (Angelou Northeast and Walters) offer mostly popular fiction and media titles in their limited spaces.

- Advanced Learning Library - 711 W. 2nd, Wichita, KS 67203, (316) 261-8500 (geographical coordinates: 37°41′15″N 97°20′50″W)
- Alford - 3447 S. Meridian, Wichita, KS 67217, (316) 350-3261 (geographical coordinates: 37°37′55″N 97°22′21″W)
- Angelou Northeast - 3051 E. 21st Street, Wichita, KS 67214, (316) 688-9580 (geographical coordinates: 37°43′20″N 97°18′1″W)
- Evergreen - 2601 N. Arkansas, Wichita, KS 67204, (316) 303-8181 (geographical coordinates: 37°43′49″N 97°20′43″W)
- Rockwell - 5939 E. 9th, Wichita, KS 67208, (316) 688-9361 (geographical coordinates: 37°42′2″N 97°16′3″W)
- Walters - 4195 E. Harry, Wichita, KS 67218, (316) 337-9125 (geographical coordinates: 37°39′51.39″N 97°17′15.97″W)
- Westlink - 8515 Bekemeyer, Wichita, KS 67212, (316) 337-9456 (geographical coordinates: 37°41′49″N 97°26′30″W)

== History ==
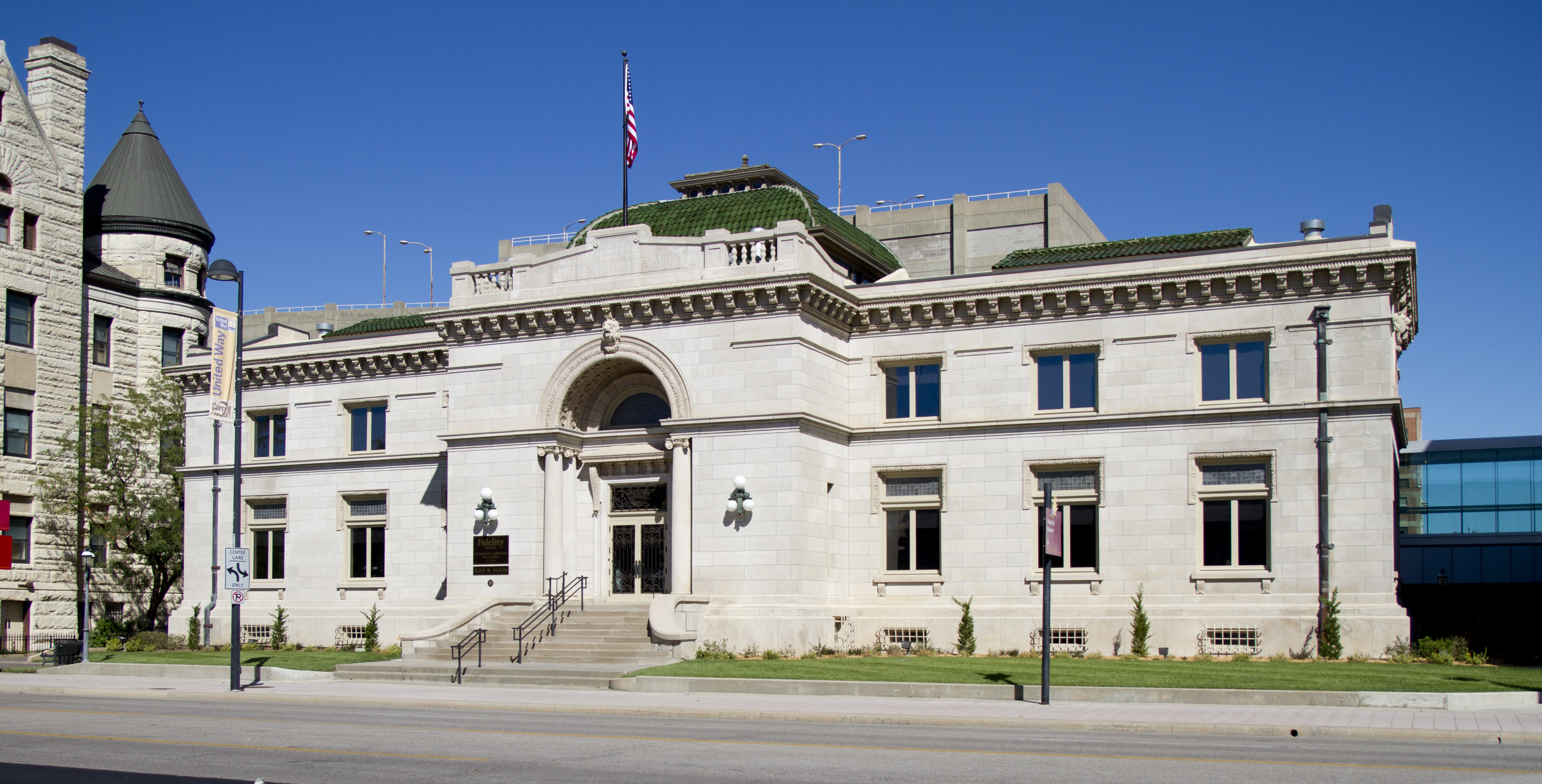
Wichita City Carnegie Library Building

Local business owners funded the establishment of the library in 1876. In 1915, it expanded into a Carnegie library, the Wichita City Carnegie Library Building, that would remain open until the establishment of the new Brutalist-style Wichita Central Library. It opened in 1967 to the general public.

On October 16, 2007, the Wichita City Council decided on the preferred site for a new central library at Second Street and McLean. The initial building program resulted in a projected budget exceeding the amount allotted, forcing the library to consider alternatives. In 2011, a study found that expanding the current Central Library facility would be possible, but would be more expensive than building a new facility and would not resolve building access issues. In 2012-13, the library's board of directors considered a phased construction approach. The city council authorized a request for qualifications, with a presentation by a preferred design team in the summer of 2014.

In January 2015, Wichita City Council voted in favor of a funding agreement with the library foundation to perform the design phase. The new facility, named the Advanced Learning Library, cost an estimated $33 million. It is two stories and has 99,930 square feet (9,284 m^{2}) of interior space; it is designed to withstand storms and act as a storm shelter. Following the closure of the Central Public Library on May 6, 2018 after 50 years of service to the Wichita area, the Advanced Learning Library opened on June 16, 2018.

In December 2014, the Orchard Park branch inside Orchard Park Recreation Center at 4808 West 9th was closed.

The Comotara Branch Library, located inside a Dillon's supermarket since 1986, was the first library branch in the United States to open in a grocery store. The branch closed in July 2018 so Dillon's could reclaim the space.

== Reference services and resources ==
The Wichita Public Library offers resources including reference in person, by telephone call and text message, by mail, by live online chat service, and by e-mail. As of 2011, its holdings included more than 1 million volumes.

The library offers the most research capabilities from its Advanced Learning Library, located downtown. Many electronic resources are offered from the library's website and can be used by patrons from home with a library card. Additional resources are available in partnership with the State Library of Kansas and the Kansas Library Card, such as the Digital eLending (e-books and e-audiobooks) service.

== Programs ==
The library offers a wide range of programs free of charge and open to the public. Annual events include events in celebration of African-American History Month, Hispanic Heritage Month and the Academy Award Shorts (see below).

The library's summer reading programs for youth reach more than 10,000 children annually. Annually, the library offers a reading program for adults. Each year since 2008, the library has hosted "The Big Read Wichita", a series of programs built around one book title.

The WPL's "Academy Awards Shorts" program is, reportedly, the oldest annual, complete, free public screening, outside of Hollywood, of the full array of short documentary, live action and animated "short" films (under 40 minutes) nominated for an Academy Award ("Oscar"). The films are normally presented, free, at the library and in local theaters and other venues around Wichita, shortly before the Academy Awards ceremonies.

== Other Wichita area libraries ==
Notable Wichita-area libraries include:

- Wichita State University Libraries is a research library system with holdings of more than 2 million volumes, over 200 databases, and more than 70,000 journal subscriptions. The WSU Libraries include the main Ablah Library, the McKinley Chemistry Library, the Thurlow Lieurance Music Library, and the University Libraries Special Collections. WSU Libraries are open to community users and serve as a regional United States Federal Government Documents Depository, a State of Kansas Government Documents Depository, and is the State of Kansas' only Patents and Trademarks Library. WSU Special Collections and University Archives contains numerous rare books and incunabula, historical manuscripts collections and maps, photographic archives documenting Kansas history, and hosts the Wichita Photo Archives.
- The Wichita Law Library, affiliated with the Wichita Bar Association
- The Archives of the Kansas Aviation Museum, which contain extensive documents on aviation, particularly the Wichita aviation industry

== See also ==
- Wichita City Carnegie Library Building
- Exploration Place
