= Exploration Place =

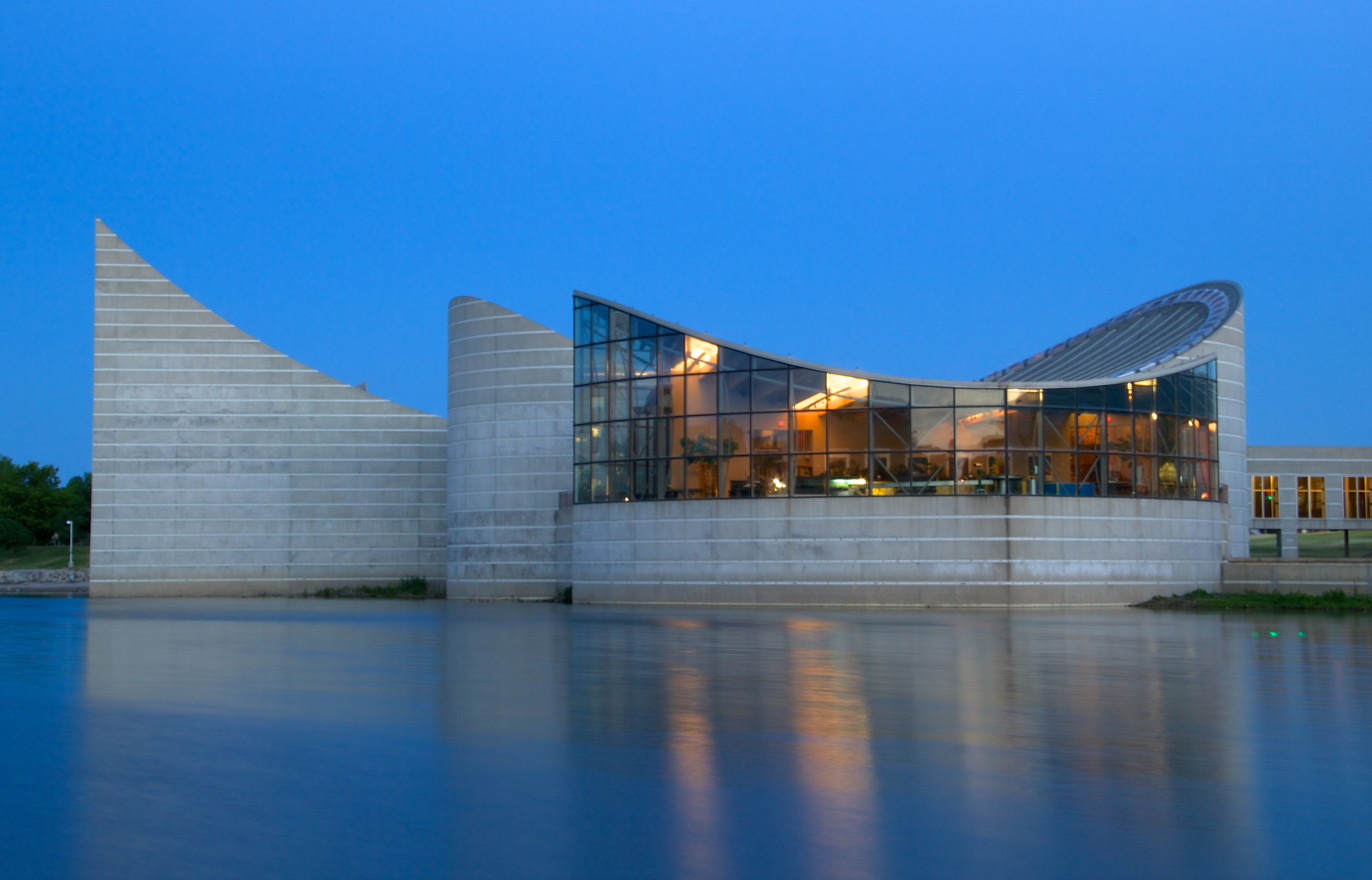
- The Exploration Place next to the Arkansas River (2013)

- Location within Kansas
- Established: April 1, 2000
- Location: 300 North McLean Blvd, Wichita, Kansas 67203; United States
- Coordinates: 37°41′N 97°21′W
- Type: Science museum
- President: Adam Smith
- Website: exploration.org

Exploration Place is a science museum located on the west side of the Arkansas River in the Delano neighborhood of Wichita, Kansas, United States. It is a 501(c)(3) not-for-profit institution.

== History ==
During the 1980s, a plan to consolidate the city-owned Wichita Omnisphere and Science Center and the Children's Museum of Wichita was proposed. In 1992, a capital funds campaign was launched, and with an endowment from Velma Lunt Wallace, funds from the City of Wichita and Sedgwick County, and other donations, the museum opened in the spring of 2000.

The museum is supported by admissions, membership dues, Sedgwick County government, and other public support and voluntary contributions from individuals, corporations and foundations. In 2019 Exploration Place had attendance of 345,838, made up of 279,640 people visiting the facility and 66,198 people engaged through outreach programs.

From April 2000 to around mid 2007, KSN-TV had a live exhibit called "The KSN WeatherLab". Meteorologists did live broadcasts daily, while spectators could sit in bleachers and watch. During off-air hours, visitors could interact with the green screen as well as ask meteorologists questions (via a walk-up style window).

== Building ==
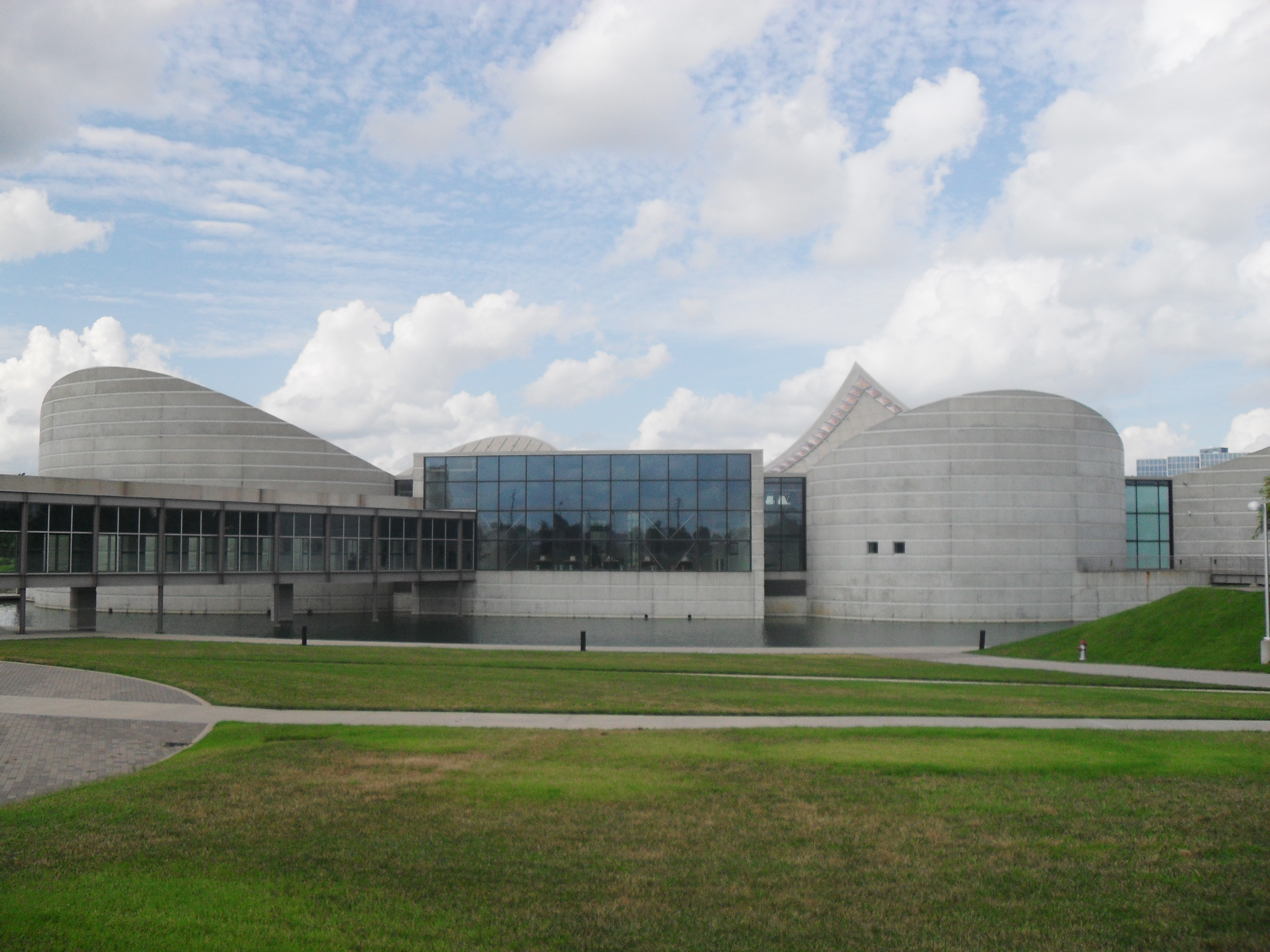
A view of the floor to ceiling windows on the island building.

Construction began May 1997 and took 2 ½ years. Internationally acclaimed architect Moshe Safdie of Boston designed the building. There are 100,000 square feet (9,300 m^{2}) and 20 acres (81,000 m^{2}) on the property. The tallest point of the building is the peak of the roof of the traveling exhibits space and is 70 feet (21 m) above the floor (nearly 7 stories high). The combined distance around the interior perimeter of both buildings is approximately one mile.

The "Island Building" is named because it is surrounded by water, with the Arkansas River on one side and the reflecting pond on the other. The reflecting pond is between the buildings to create the illusion that looks like the river runs between the buildings. The reflecting pond is one to three feet deep. Even though the building is so close to the river it is not prone to flooding because it is above the 100-year flood level. During the flood in October 1998, the worst in recent history, the water level was still more than 8 feet (2.4 m) below the finished floor level.

== Dome Theater ==
This venue is the largest dome theater in Kansas with a 60-foot high, 360-degree screen. It shows digital films. General museum admission is not required to see a show at the dome.

== Kemper Creative Learning Studio ==
This venue is a 140-seat theater equipped with audio/visual equipment, sound system, podium and stage lighting. It is the home of live science shows.

== Exhibits ==
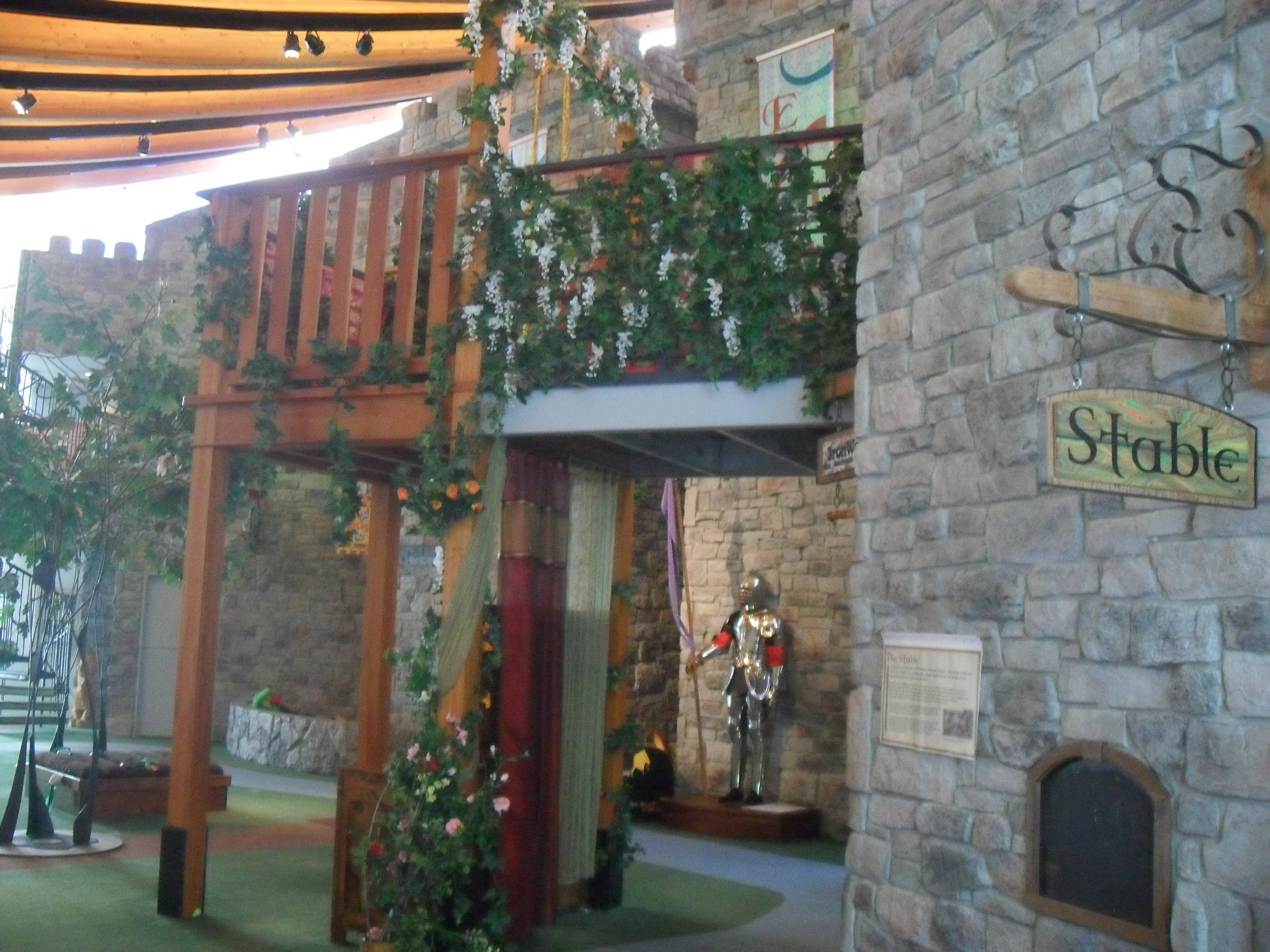
Where Kids Rule three-story castle at Exploration Place (2010)

- Health Inside Out - a hub of discovery, fascination and respect for the human body
- Design, Build, Fly - this award-winning exhibit reveals what happens behind the scenes in Wichita's aircraft plants. Design an airplane seat. Test landing gear. Rivet a wing. Pretend to be a superstar in a luxury jet.
- Explore Kansas - features facts about the state's land, water, weather and inhabitants.
- Kansas in Miniature - a small-scale recreation of early-1950s Kansas buildings, landmarks and more.
- TeamLab - Designed to spark imagination and teamwork, this dynamic space offers hands-on experiences that blend play and innovation. TeamLab was born from an idea to expand collaborative play.
- Kansas Kids Connect - an immersive area where young children will discover the world around them and find out how country and city living are more alike than we may think. For children 5 and under
- Traveling exhibits - an area which has hosted more than 30 different temporary exhibits including Astronaut, A T. rex Named Sue, Titanic: The Artifact Exhibition, CSI: The Experience, and Star Wars:® Where Science Meets Imagination.
- Where Kids Rule - includes a three-story medieval castle where children can experience more than 60 hands-on, STEM-based exhibits.

== Explore Store ==
This 1,900 square-foot shopping extravaganza connects you to science and educational toys. The store is now one of the few places in the area to feature fair trade items. All purchases help support Exploration Place. General museum admission is not required to shop the store.

== Outdoors ==
- The Wichita Foundation Amphitheater is the newest of two upcoming outdoor additions. The amphitheater is an approx. 1500-capacity open space that looks directly toward Wichita's The Keeper of the Plains.

Exploration Place is set to open a 6.5 acre destination playscape in 2025.

== Hours and admission ==
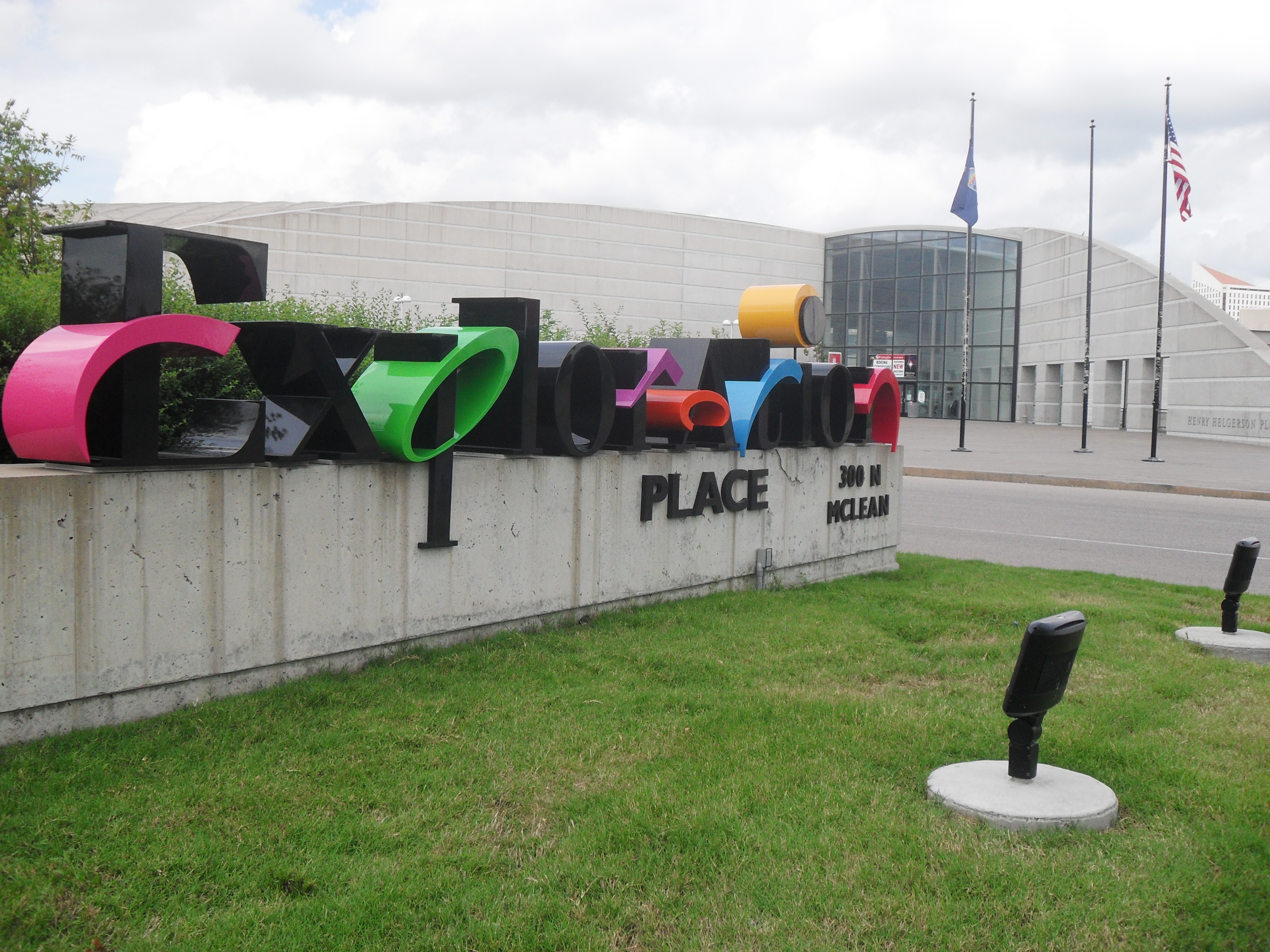
Front of building (2010)

Hours

- Daily 10:00 a.m. to 5 p.m., late opening Thursday until 8 p.m.
- Closed on Thanksgiving Day and Christmas Day.

Admission includes unlimited access to exhibits, live science shows, laser shows and Dome movies.

- Senior (65+) = $16.00
- Adult (12–64) = $21.00
- Youth (3–11) = $16.00
- Children (2 and under) = Free
- Members = Free
- SNAP/EBT = Free

== See also ==
- Wichita Public Library, main library, is located across the street from Exploration Place
