= Northfield School of the Liberal Arts =

Location
- 1813 W University Ave; Wichita, Kansas 67213; United States; 37.6774°N 97.3618°W

Information
- Type: A microschool community and educational campus
- Motto: Nascantur in Admiratione (Let them be Born into Wonder)
- Established: 1993
- Campus: Northfield School of the Liberal Arts
- Website: northfieldschool.com

Northfield School of the Liberal Arts is a microschool community and educational campus in Wichita, Kansas. Founded in 1993 as a single private school, it now hosts autonomous microschools that share a common educational philosophy and campus infrastructure, including Northfield Academy as of 2026.
