= Wichita City Carnegie Library Building =

- Wichita City (Carnegie) Library Building
- U.S. National Register of Historic Places
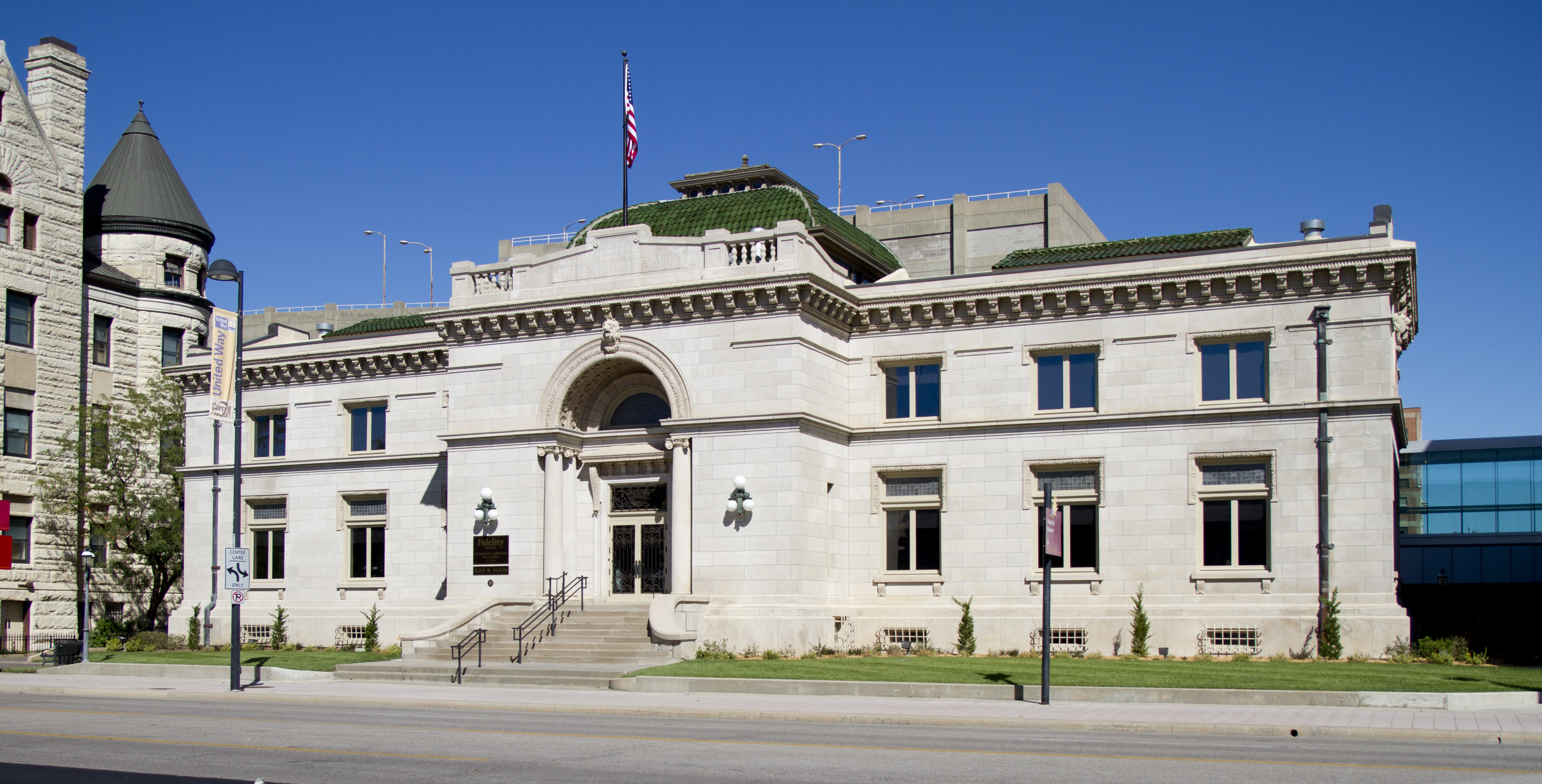
- Interactive map of Wichita City (Carnegie) Library Building
- Location: 220 S. Main, Wichita, Kansas
- Coordinates: 37°41′14″N 97°20′21″W
- Area: less than one acre
- Built: 1915
- Architect: Crowell, Anthony Allaire
- Architectural style: Beaux Arts
- MPS: Carnegie Libraries of Kansas TR
- NRHP reference No.: 87000971
- Added to NRHP: June 25, 1987

The Wichita City Carnegie Library Building located at 220 S. Main Street in Wichita, Kansas, Sedgwick County, Kansas, United States, is a Carnegie library built in 1915. It was listed on the National Register of Historic Places in 1987. The two-story, limestone Beaux Arts building stands in the southwestern part of Wichita's central business district, directly south of the old City Hall. Its façade orientation is west. The building measures approximately one hundred and twenty-eight feet from north to south and eighty-three feet from east to west. After the completion of Wichita's Central Library in 1966, the Wichita City Carnegie Library Building served as city offices and the municipal court until the Wichita Omnisphere and Science Center established its tenancy in 1976, followed by changing tenants.

The two-story, ashlar cut, limestone block building sits on an ashlar cut, limestone block, raised foundation with a multiply moulded watertable. Three bays comprise the rectangular building's façade and rear. The building's main body is one bay deep, a one-bay-by-one-bay brick unit extends from the rear elevation's center bay. A parapetted entry pavilion projects from the facade's center bay. A short, square tower rises from the building's central bay, covered by a rounded, truncated hipped roof sheathed with pantiles and surmounted by a monitor roof. Tripartite windows with translucent glass pierce each wall of the central tower. Standing seam metal covers the gable roofs of the two main wings, the metal may have been tarred. Two skylights, which have been covered due to water leakage, pierce the gable roofs midway. The entry pavilion and the rear extension have low roofs hidden by parapets, they are likely covered with tar and gravel. The building retains its original metal drain pipes on the outer edges of the façade and the rear extension.

A limestone or terracotta entablature, consisting of a multiply moulded bottom course surmounted by an egg and dart architrave, a bracketed frieze, and an incised vegetal and shell motif cornice engages the building on all elevations except the rear.

The interior was designed by interior designer Louise Caldwell Murdock, a noted interior designer trained at the Parsons School of Fine Art in New York. In 1987 it was described that the building "maintains its original atrium floorplan and ceramic tiled floors. The beamed and coffered first level ceiling, the Doric pilasters below the ceiling beams, the first level marble columns, the egg and dart moulding ceiling cornice on the first level, the wooden door and window surrounds, the double cast iron staircase in the vestibule, and the three story, classically detailed atrium surround are retained."

In 2006, Fidelity Bank purchased the building, and is now its corporate headquarters.
