= Blackbear Bosin =

Native American sculptor and painter (1921–1980)

- Sétkóñ:gyái (Tsate Kongia)
- Born: Francis Blackbear Bosin; June 5, 1921; Cyril, Oklahoma, United States
- Died: August 9, 1980 (aged 59); Wichita, Kansas, United States
- Occupations: Artist (sculptor, painter), Graphic Designer
- Notable work: Keeper of the Plains, 1968-1974; From Whence All Life, 1972; Wichita, My Son, 1965; Prairie Fire, 1955; Wind Spirit, 1955
- Awards: National American Indian Achievements Award, American Indian Art and Cultural Exchange, 1976; Certificate of Appreciation, American Revolution Bicentennial Administration, 1976; Distinguished Service Award, State of Kansas, 1977; Kansas Governor's Artist, 1977
- Website: blackbearbosin.com

Blackbear Bosin (June 5, 1921 – August 9, 1980) was a self-taught Kiowa/Comanche sculptor, painter, and commercial artist. He is also known by his Kiowa name, Tsate Kongia (Kiowa: Sétkóñ:gyái), which means "black bear."

Bosin gained notoriety for his surreal and dynamic variations on the traditional Flatstyle painting of the Southern Plains Indians, and he added depth, motion, and drama to the genre while emphasizing symbolism.

His works have been modern icons of Native American art, and of his community (Wichita), county (Sedgwick County), state (Kansas) and region.

== Early life (1921–1946) ==
Francis Blackbear Bosin was born June 5, 1921, in Cyril, Oklahoma, near Anadarko, reportedly in a tipi. His father, Frank Blackbear, was Kiowa, and his mother, Ada Tivis Bosin, was of the Quahadi (Antelope Eater) band, of the Comanche Nation. His Kiowa name, Tsate Kongia (Kiowa: Sétkóñ:gyái), means "Blackbear" and belongs to his paternal grandfather, a Kiowa chief. As the oldest male child, he was sent to live with his maternal, Comanche grandparents as soon as he could walk. He attended St. Patrick's Mission School in Anadarko where he was exposed to the paintings of the Kiowa Six.

Bosin briefly studied Anadarko High School before leaving to attend Cyril High School. At 17, Bosin married Ruth Johnson (Caddo), and the couple had two daughters, Rowena and Patricia. The University of Oklahoma offered him an arts scholarship after graduating high school, but due to his new responsibilities as a husband and a father, he turned it down. Instead, he chose to attend the Chilocco Indian Agricultural School where he trained to work with sheet metal. In 1940, Bosin and Johnson moved to Wichita, Kansas, with their daughters. It was here that the couple had two sons, Francis Jr. and Niles. Bosin found work at Beech Aircraft.

To support his family, Bosin enlisted in the U.S. Marine Corps and was trained as a machine gunner. In November 1943, while stationed in Maui, Hawaii, he fell ill and had to be hospitalized at Aiea Heights Naval Hospital in Honolulu, Hawaii. Here he took up painting again. Before his discharge in 1945, the hospital hosted a one-man exhibition of his works (later mistakenly reported a one-man exhibition of the Honolulu Academy of Arts). Before leaving the military, Bosin briefly returned to Wichita to sign divorce papers, which marked the end of his marriage with Johnson. Bosin permanently returned to Wichita in 1946, where he worked as a color separator and plate maker for Western Lithograph and then as an industrial designer and production illustrator for Boeing-Wichita.

== Art career (1946–1967) ==
After returning to Wichita in 1946, Bosin continued to paint. In the same year, he entered the Philbrook Art Center's first Indian Artists Annual, where he won an honorable mention for Green Corn Dance. After his success at the Philbrook, Bosin continued to enter art competitions there and at other galleries, art centers, and museums. Between 1947 and 1948, his work was included in exhibitions at the Dallas Museum of Fine Arts and the Detroit Institute of Arts. In 1951, Bosin entered an Indian art competition held by the Denver Museum of Art, where he was awarded the Purchase Prize.

Bosin's career as an artist began to take off in the early 1950s, beginning in 1950 with a special showing of 66 of his paintings, at the National Museum of Natural History, of the Smithsonian Institution, in Washington, D.C. At the Philbrook's Indian Art Annual in 1952 he was awarded first prize for Death Bird.

While working at Boeing, Bosin met Nola Simmonds, an art teacher who would later become his wife. The two were married in 1953, after which they moved in together and Bosin became stepfather to David, Simmonds only child. Bosin's daughters lived with the family in Wichita until they both graduated high school, and one of his sons, Francis Jr., lived with them up until the sixth grade.

Also in 1953, Bosin again secured first place at the Philbrook with Prairie Fire, the piece that eventually brought him international recognition. The acclaimed painting was purchased by the Philbrook and later featured as a centerfold, with detailed description, in the May 1955 issue of National Geographic. The work, with its vivid depiction of action—Indians on galloping horses, and animals desperately fleeing an oncoming fire—was regarded as a turning point in the field of normally static Plains Indians art. For a time, it was displayed in the White House.

In 1955, his works were exhibited at the National Gallery in Washington, D.C. In 1955, Wind Spirit, the companion piece to Prairie Fire, was shown at the DeYoung Museum in San Francisco, and then won the Purchase Prize at the Philbrook's Indian Annual. After the competition, the Philbrook invited Bosin to participate in a one-man exhibition.

Bosin opened the Great Plains Studio in 1959 to expand his studio space and display his art alongside the works of other Indigenous artists. The same year, he was commissioned by the Hotel Broadview in downtown Wichita to design a mosaic mural for the Crystal Ballroom. Constructed entirely from semi-opaque glass chips and measuring an incredible 1,500 square feet, The Advance of Civilization in Kansas is the largest continuous mural in Kansas.

His paintings continued to be awarded by art institutions. In 1960, Bosin entered the All-Indian Show in New York, where he won both the First and Grand Prize. The following year he traveled to Kreuzlingen, Switzerland, to receive honors after he was elected Fellow of the International Institute of Arts and Letters (IIAL). In the same year, two of his former entries in the Philbrook's Indian Artist Annual were purchased by the Arts and Crafts Board of the U.S. Department of the Interior. In 1963, the Philbrook hosted another one-man show of Bosin's work and four of his pieces were included in the Heard Museum's Gallery of Indian Art's inaugural exhibition.

Two years later, in 1965, Bosin proceeded to win first place and the Grand Prize at the Philbrook's Indian Artists Annual. The same year, the Wichita Art Museum hosted a showing of 24 of Bosin's works. The museum later commissioned him to do a painting titled, Wichita, My Son, which represents the relationship between Wichita and the local Indigenous communities. Bosin also participated in an exhibition at the Whitney Gallery of Western Art at the Buffalo Bill Cody complex in Cody, Wyoming.

Bosin was the only Native American artist to participate in the 1965 White House Festival of the Arts, when Prairie Fire was displayed at both the White House and the National Gallery of Art. The beaded bowtie and cummerbund he wore were made by his mother and attracted the attention of the First Lady, Lady Bird Johnson, who requested that Bosin be moved to sit at her table.

The U.S. Department of the Interior commissioned a series of paintings from Bosin, known as the Kiowa Series, devoted to displaying the historical and religious heritage of the Kiowa. The series consisted of three works, Of the Owls Telling, Taime Man, and The Ten Grandmothers. Bosin completed the first two paintings between 1965 and 1966, but the final work was not finished until 1973 and the series was not publicly displayed until 1976. He was awarded a Certificate of Appreciation by the Indian Arts and Crafts Board of the Department of the Interior in 1966.

In 1967, Bosin was awarded the Victory Trophy at the 22nd Indian Annual hosted by the Philbrook. After receiving this award, he decided to step back from entering art competitions altogether because he believed it was time for younger artists to gain recognition. He was also chosen as an exhibitor, that year, for the Smithsonian Institution's American Discovers Indian Art Show.

== Later years and death (1967–1980) ==
=== Keeper of the Plains ===
Bosin had been experiencing health issues, starting in 1960 when he was diagnosed with diabetes, but his health worsened significantly in 1968. He had to be hospitalized for a period and his doctors advised that he slow down his work. A year later, Bosin suffered his first heart attack.

While in the hospital, Elmer Hall, a friend of Bosin and employee of the KG&E plant in Wichita, asked Bosin if he would design a large-scale statue as tribute to the Indigenous peoples in the area. The statue — a 44-foot, 5-ton, Cor-Ten steel sculpture — is a giant, stylized representation of a Native American in historic dress, gesturing to the Great Spirit in the sky, and titled The Keeper of the Plains.

It is situated near the city's center, immediately northwest of downtown Wichita, adjacent to the grounds of the Mid-America All-Indian Center, at the confluence of the Big Arkansas and Little Arkansas rivers,—a site sacred to Native Americans, and the former home of the Wichita tribe.

Construction of the sculpture began in 1970 and, after multiple financial setbacks, was finally completed in 1974, ostensibly as a commemorative project in preparation for the 1976 United States Bicentennial. A ceremony with performances and blessings by local Indigenous peoples, including a blessing in the Winnebago language by Etta Hunter, and speech by U.S. Senator Bob Dole, was held for the official unveiling of the giant sculpture.

In subsequent years, the statue has come be the unofficial (in some cases, official) symbol of Wichita, — widely reproduced and represented — and is the core element in the official seal of the surrounding county, Sedgwick County, Kansas.

The Keeper has become the focal point of a $20 million river-beautification project, with ornate, symbolic footbridges built to the site, and a park, walkways, gardens and fire pits installed around the statue, which has been mounted on a 30-foot-high rock pedestal jutting out into the river. The statue is the centerpiece of some public events, including Native American events and commemorations of the statue, itself.

In 1975, two 10-foot replicas of the sculpture were installed in Wichita's sister cities: Tlalnepantla, Mexico, and Orleans, France. Starting in 2017, a local business organization began commissioning dozens of 10-foot glass-fiber replicas of the statue, for installation throughout the city—each one decorated individually by local artists, usually with a locally relevant symbolic theme.

=== Later art career ===
In 1970, Bosin exhibited at the All-Indian Show, at the Kennedy Center, in New York City.

In the early months of 1971, Bosin held a show at the Wichita Art Association and was commissioned by the Farm Credit Bank of Wichita to paint a large-scale mural, From Whence All Life, with its signature central figure of the Great Spirit.

Months later in September, Bosin had to undergo open heart surgery, which severely set back the progress of the mural. His recovery was lengthy, and he suffered loss of sight in both eyes that left wide, horizontal fields of darkness across his vision. The quality of Bosin's painting did not decline because of his vision loss, but it did make the work more difficult for him. To complete the mural on time, his wife and office staff helped paint the basic areas of the work while he filled in the details. The mural was unveiled in 1972.

Bosin was commissioned to create ten designs for a series of fifty sterling silver medals produced by the Franklin Mint for The Medallic History of the American Indian in 1975. The double-sided coins recorded historical events ranging from prehistoric migration from Asia to North America to the completion of the transcontinental railroad, featuring the "traditional view" of the event on one side and the "Indian interpretation" on the other.

In 1976, Bosin was honored at the American Indian National Achievement Awards in the Traditional Indian Painting category. He was also included in Songs from the Earth, an important exhibition of Indigenous art, and appointed to the Kansas Arts Commission Board.

The state of Kansas awarded Bosin the Distinguished Service Award in 1977. He was later appointed as Governor's Artist by Robert Frederick Bennett, Kansas's governor at the time.

Bosin began restricting the showing of his work in 1978, but he did show in the Oklahoma Museum of Art and the New Britain Museum of American Art during that year. Due to the toll his loss of vision took on his ability to paint quickly, Bosin had to give up gouache in favor of acrylics. While the acrylics dried less quickly than gouache, they did not have the same layered effect as Bosin's earlier works. He produced his final painting, Reflections of Rainy Mountains, using acrylics.

=== Final years ===
In the later years of his life, Bosin began to dance at regional powwows with his close friends. He wore traditional regalia that was adorned with his mother's intricate beadwork. Bosin led a dance to the rhythm of a song that was passed on to him by his father when he had been inducted into the Kiowa Gourd Society and O-Ho-Mahs Lodge Society years before.

In March 1980, Bosin's mother died while living with him and his wife. Stricken by grief, Bosin struggled to complete his final commissions.

Five months later, on August 9, 1980, Bosin died from heart problems and complications stemming from a severe gall bladder infection. He was survived by his second wife, Nola Davidson Simmonds, his four children, Rowena, Patricia, Francis Jr., and Niles, and stepson, David Simmonds.

In 2012, David Simmonds published a biography detailing Bosin's life and accomplishments, titled Blackbear Bosin: Keeper of the Indian Spirit.

== Art style and practice ==
=== Painting and sketching ===
Bosin began practicing art while attending St. Patrick's Mission School in Anadarko, where he was able to study Kiowa and European art through the school's collections. It was through his observations of historical art forms that he learned how to manipulate bodily proportions, create anatomically correct figures, and emulate the style of the Kiowa Six. He was also heavily influenced by his mother, who was an accomplished bead worker.

A self-taught artist, Bosin attributed his distinctive artistic style to his lack of formal arts training and relative isolation from other practicing artists. His work became increasingly complex and dynamic, reflecting the influence of surrealists and his incorporation of culturally specific scenes and subject matter. He wove a unique aesthetic combining the Southern Plains Indians' flat style of painting with modern surrealism, delivered through Bosin's favorite medium, gouache, a type of opaque watercolor paint. Watercolors and gouache allowed Bosin to create a controlled layering effect that gave his canvasses their distinctive look.

Bosin was known to make several drafts of each painting, sometimes making up to ten sketches before transferring the image onto the canvas, to ensure that the composition was correct. Bosin also began to include increasingly detailed backgrounds in his paintings that set the tone of the piece and constructed a sense of space.

Although he could paint in European-style realism, Bosin found no reason to do so. In a 1975 interview, he stated: "I find it empty. I simply don't care for it. I would rather stay within the limitations of Traditional Indian paintings," going on to explain that adapting and reshaping traditional styles better represents the transient, poetic experience he is trying to capture in his work.

Bosin also frequently sketched, filling his sketchbooks with caricatures, drawings, and cartoons, all of which he signed as "Chief." The first and only time his cartoons were exhibited was in 1979 at the New Britain Museum of American Art in Connecticut.

=== Commercial art ===
Bosin also worked as a production illustrator and commercial artist. In 1952 when he left Boeing to work in the training aids and arts department at McConnell Air Force Base, Bosin produced visual training materials for pilots. His instructional booklet, JetRock Jock, took a humorous approach to advising pilots of the various mishaps and dangers of flying. The booklet gained popularity and was distributed to other pilot training programs across the United States.

In 1955, Bosin left the civil service sector to pursue art fulltime. He partnered with A.E. "Waddy" Wadsworth to open a small commercial art studio where they produced visuals for local movie theaters and small businesses.

Bosin also designed the logos for the Mid-America All-Indian Center in Wichita, and the Wolf Creek nuclear power plant, of Kansas Gas & Electric Co. (KG&E, absorbed into Westar, later into Evergy) in Burlington, Kansas.

== Awards and honors ==
- Certificate of Merit, the Philbrook Indian Art Annual, 1946
- Purchase Prize, the Denver Art Museum Indian Art Competition, 1951
- First Prize, the Philbrook Indian Art Annual, 1952
- Grand Prize, the Philbrook Indian Art Annual, 1953
- Purchase Prize, the Philbrook Indian Art Annual, 1955
- Grand and First Prize, the All-Indian Show, New York, 1960
- Fellow of the International Institute of Arts and Letters, Kreuzlingen, Switzerland, 1961
- Grand Prize and First Prize, the Philbrook Indian Art Annual, 1965
- Certificate of Appreciation, the Indian Arts and Crafts Board, 1966
- Victory Trophy, the Philbrook American Indian Artists Exhibition, 1967
- Award for Traditional Indian Painting, the American Indian National Achievement Awards, 1976
- Distinguished Service Award, the State of Kansas, 1977
- Governor's Artist, Governor Robert F. Bennett of Kansas, 1977
- Blackbear Bosin Academy, Wichita Public Schools, named for him (closed in 2012).

== Images of Bosin's art ==
Partial list. These links are to images of the original artwork, or to reproductions/prints:

=== Paintings ===
- "Art Gallery: Blackbear Bosin", Cowboys & Indians magazine, July 13, 2022:
  - Prairie Fire (ca.1955); also at: "About the Artist," BlackbearBosin.com. (A variant also depicted at: Hindman (Chicago), on Invaluable.com)
  - Torches of the Soul Seekers
  - Reflections of Rainy Mountain (Bosin's final work, ca.1979)
- Wind Spirit, (tornado) (1955), Metropolitan Museum of Art, New York City
- Gilcrease Museum, Tulsa, Oklahoma:
  - Two Deer, (1944)
  - Two Females Bathing, (1955, or before)
  - Winter Hunt, (1955)
  - Two Indians, (gesturing in sign language) (mid-20th Century)
  - Eagle Dancer, (mid-20th Century)
  - Indian man on lunging horse, (1967)
- Winter Crossing, (1963), The Rockwell Museum, Corning, New York
- Mandan Mother and Child, (ca.1963), Buffalo Bill Center of the West
- Minataree Green Corn Dance (1960–1965), National Museum of the American Indian, Smithsonian Institution; also at Harris & Co. Frame Shop, at The Work Room, Wichita, Kansas
- Wichita, My Son (ca.1965), Wichita Art Museum; also at: The Workroom, and at Equip-Bid Auctions
- Of the Owls Telling, of the Kiowa Series, (1965–1966), Native American Art, Gallery 3, FirstPeople.us
- From Whence All Life. (the "Great Spirit" mural, 1971–1972) (with visitors), Mid-America All-Indian Museum, Mid-America All-Indian Center; also low-resolution, full-width image, at "Things to Do in Wichita Kansas – The Old West,", Get Lost in the U.S.A.; and detail image of right-most two-thirds at: "About the Artist," BlackbearBosin.com.
- The Work Room / Harris & Co. Frame Shop, Wichita, Kansas:
  - Night Singers; also at Worthpoint
  - The Day The Sun Died
  - Feather Dancer; (also at: Wyld Gallery; and at ; colors apparently distorted)
- The Kiowa Dancer,, Maynards Fine Art & Antiques, Richmond, B.C., Canada; also at: Garth's Auctioneers & Appraisers, Columbus, Ohio, via Invaluable.com
- Wind Song, BlackbearBosin.com

=== Drawings and sketches ===
- The Work Room / Harris & Co. Frame Shop, Wichita, Kansas:
  - Bathing Woman; also at: Little Bull Auction & Sales Co., Augusta, Kansas, via Invaluable.com
  - Child w/ Doll; also at: Little Bull Auction & Sales Co., Augusta, Kansas, via Invaluable.com
  - Native Man head
- untitled (horse), Santa Fe Art Auction, via Invaluable.com

=== Sculpture ===
- The Keeper of the Plains (daytime), contest photo, Smithsonian Institution
- The Keeper of the Plains (daytime), panorama, City of Wichita
- "Keeper of the Plains Plaza" (daytime panorama video), 360Wichita.com
- The Keeper of the Plains (twilight, with torches), KWCH-TV
- " Wichita Kansas Keeper Of The Plains Fire," (twilight) video, Wichita Webmasters Web Design & Hosting
- The Keeper of the Plains on Fire, (nightfall, facing downtown) photograph by Joe Montiel
- Keeper of the Plains and other local images, day and night, Flickr

=== Commercial art ===
- Cover, Parnassus Yearbook, Class of 1975, Wichita State University
- logo: for the Wolf Creek nuclear power plant, Kansas Gas & Electric Co. (KG&E, absorbed into Westar, later into Evergy), at Kansas Public Radio.

== Public collections ==
- National Museum of the American Indian, Smithsonian Institution, Washington, D.C.
- Bureau of Indian Affairs, United States Department of the Interior, Washington, D.C.
- Rosemary Ellison Gallery, Southern Plains Indians Museum, Indian Arts and Crafts Board, United States Department of the Interior, Anadarko, Oklahoma
- Metropolitan Museum of Art, New York City
- Buffalo Bill Historical Center, Cody, Wyoming
- Denver Art Museum, Denver, Colorado
- Heard Museum, Phoenix, Arizona
- Gilcrease Museum, Tulsa, Oklahoma
- Philbrook Museum of Art, Tulsa, Oklahoma
- Wichita Art Museum, Wichita, Kansas.
- Wichita Art Association Gallery, Wichita, Kansas
- Mid-America All-Indian Center, Wichita, Kansas
- Private Collection, Anonymous, Wichita, Kansas
- Private Collection, Stevan Allen, Morgan Hill, California
- Eiteljorg Museum of American Indians & Western Art, Indianapolis, Indiana
- The Rockwell Museum, Corning, New York

== See also ==
- Kiowa Six
- Native American art
- Plains Indians
