= Little Arkansas River =

River in Kansas, United States

Little Arkansas River Ne Shuta Shinka River
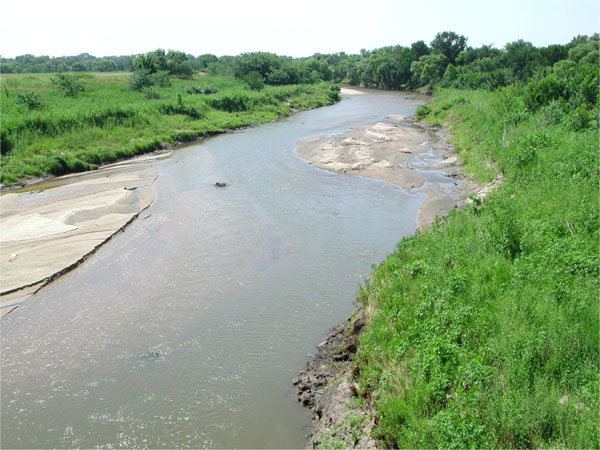
- The Little Arkansas River near Sedgwick, Kansas

Location
- Country: United States
- State: Kansas

Physical characteristics
- Source
  - location: Ellsworth County, Kansas
  - coordinates: 38°31′46″N 98°09′18″W
  - elevation: 1,759 ft (536 m)
- Mouth: Arkansas River
  - location: Wichita, Kansas
  - coordinates: 37°41′29″N 97°20′57″W
  - elevation: 1,283 ft (391 m)
- Length: 123 mi (198 km)
- Discharge
  - location: USGS 07144200 at Valley Center, KS
  - average: 315 cu ft/s (8.9 m^{3}/s)
  - minimum: 1.1 cu ft/s (0.031 m^{3}/s)
  - maximum: 28,600 cu ft/s (810 m^{3}/s)

Basin features
- Watersheds: Little Arkansas-Arkansas- Mississippi

The Little Arkansas River (/ɑːrˈkænzəs/ ar-KAN-zəs) is a river in the central Great Plains of North America. A tributary of the Arkansas River, its entire 123-mile (198 km) length lies within the American state of Kansas.

== Geography ==
The confluence of the Little Arkansas and Arkansas rivers in Wichita, Kansas.

The river originates in central Kansas in the Smoky Hills region of the Great Plains. Its source lies in extreme south-central Ellsworth County immediately north of Geneseo, Kansas. From there, the river flows generally south-southeast along the border between the Arkansas River Lowlands to the southwest and the McPherson Lowlands to the northeast. It joins the Arkansas River immediately northwest of downtown Wichita, Kansas.

== Points of interest ==
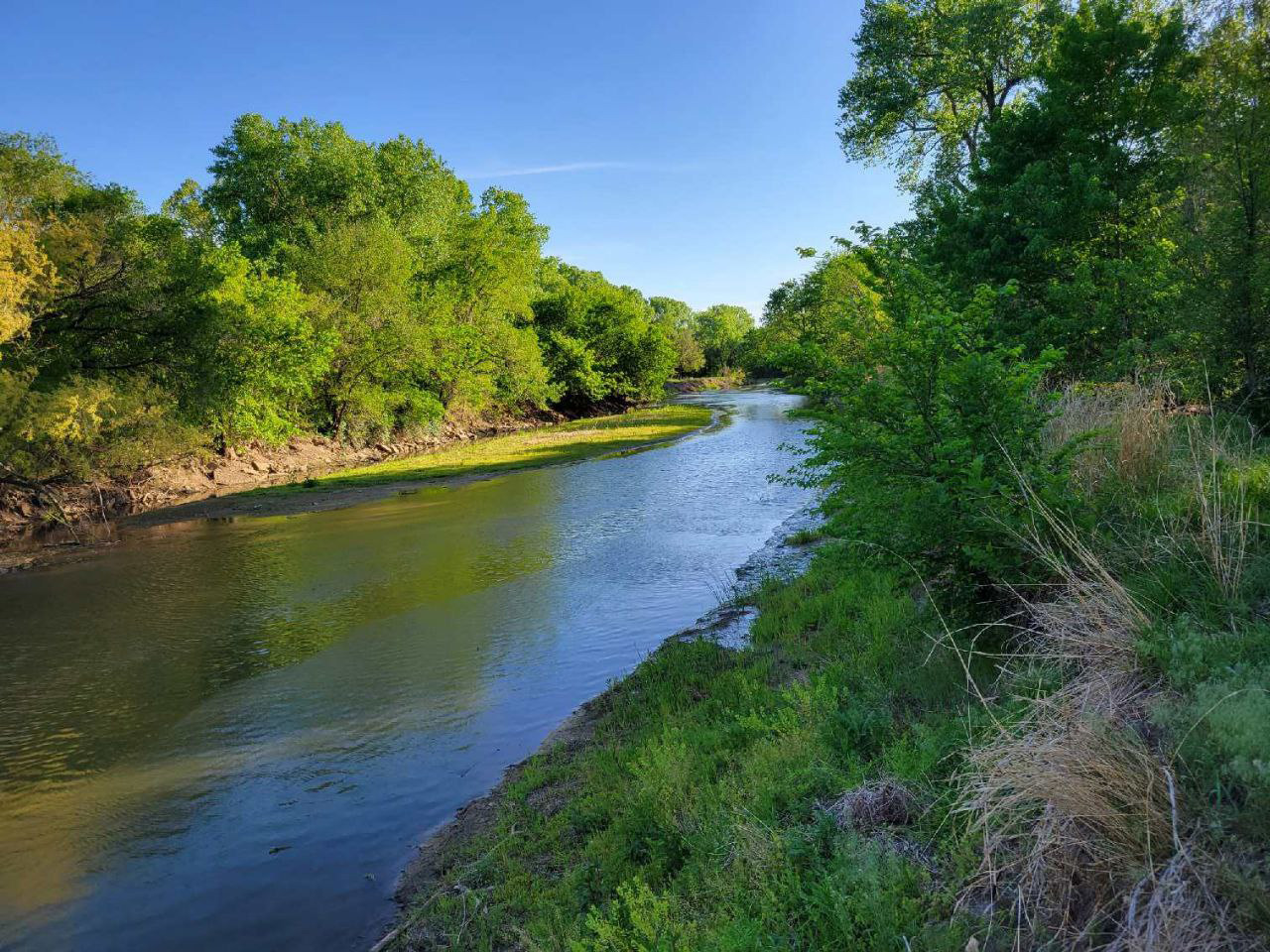
The Little Arkansas River flows through the north side of Wichita, Kansas, on May 6, 2023.

A statue, The Keeper of the Plains by local artist Blackbear Bosin, marks the confluence of these two rivers.

== See also ==
- List of rivers of Kansas
