= New Market Square =

New Market Square may refer to:

== Places ==
- New Market Square, Bydgoszcz, a city square in Bydgoszcz, Poland
- New Market Square, Wrocław, a city square in Wrocław, Poland

== Establishments ==
- NewMarket Square, a shopping mall in Wichita, Kansas
