= Old Cowtown Museum =

Old West Museum in Wichita, Kansas, United States

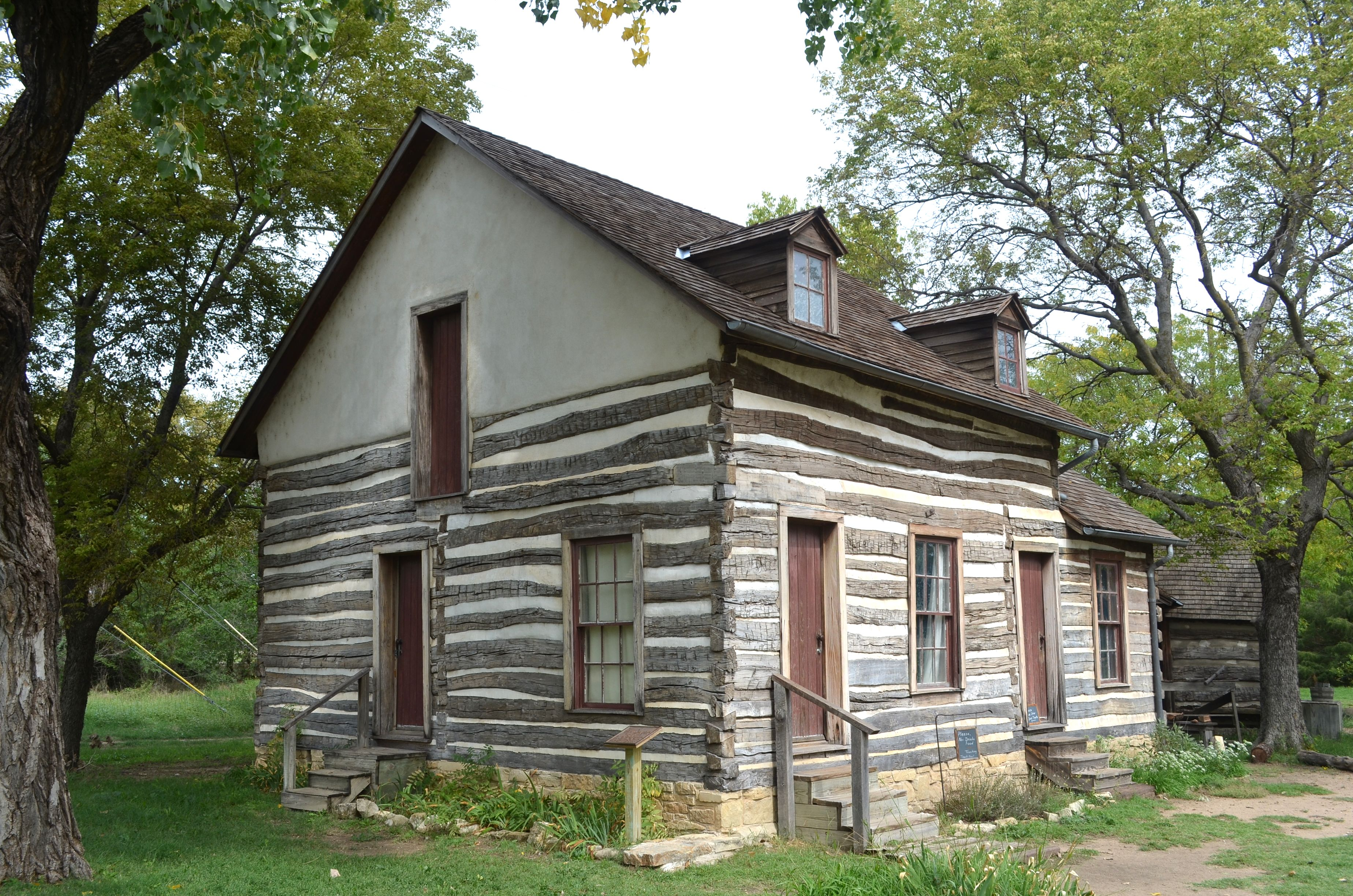
- Darius Sales Munger House, built in 1868 at 901 N. Waco

- Location within Kansas Old Cowtown Museum (the United States)
- Established: 1952
- Location: 1865 West Museum Blvd, Wichita, Kansas 67203, United States
- Coordinates: 37°41′38″N 97°21′44″W
- Type: Old West Museum
- Website: oldcowtown.org

Old Cowtown Museum is an accredited history museum located in Wichita, Kansas, United States. It is located next to the Arkansas River in central Wichita. The Museum was established in 1952, and is one of the oldest open-air history museums in central United States with 54 historic and re-created buildings, including a period farm and out-buildings, situated on 23 acres of land off the original Chisholm Trail. Cowtown is a combination of attraction, museum, living history site, and historic preservation project. The City of Wichita works with the Historic Wichita Cowtown, Inc. Board, a 501(c)(3) not-for-profit organization, to further the Museum and its mission.

== Overview ==
Private owners moved it twice, then moved it again to Cowtown in 1952. The Museum focuses on life in Wichita during the last part of the 19th century. Cowtown's unique programming tells the story of Wichita's transformation from a frontier settlement to a cattle town to an agricultural and manufacturing area. Its artifact collection includes 12,000+ items dating from the period and ranging from farm wagons to tea spoons. The museum also contains a number of live animals, such as two Texas Longhorns, two Durham shorthorn cattle, and two sheep. The Old Cowtown experience includes costumed interpreters, hands-on activities, educational programming and a calendar of diverse events throughout the year.

Cowtown is accredited by the American Alliance of Museums, the highest national recognition achievable by a museum. Only 3% of all museums in the United States are accredited.

=== Early Wichita history ===
The first permanent settlement in Wichita was a collection of grass houses inhabited by the Wichita tribe in 1864. Pioneer trader Jesse Chisholm established a trading post at the site in the 1860s (whom the Chisholm Trail was named). Wichita was founded in 1868 by businessmen then incorporated as a city in 1870. The Chisholm Trail ran along the east side of Wichita from 1867 to 1871. In 1872 the Wichita and Southwestern Railroad completed a branch line from Wichita to the Atchison, Topeka and Santa Fe Railway at Newton. As a result, Wichita became a railhead for cattle drives from Texas, from which it has derived its nickname "Cowtown." Wichita's neighboring town on the opposite (west) bank of the Arkansas River, Delano, a village of saloons and brothels, had a particular reputation for lawlessness, largely accommodating the rough, visiting cattlemen. The Wichita/Delano community gained a wild reputation, however, the east (Wichita) side of the river was kept more civil, thanks to numerous well-known lawmen who passed through, employed to help keep the rowdy cowboys in line. Among those was Wyatt Earp. After railroads were extended west and south, Wichita lost the railhead for cattle drives along with the rowdy cowboys that came with it. In 1880, Delano was annexed by Wichita, then a land boom involving speculation occurred in the late 1880s, and by 1890 the population of Wichita had exploded to nearly 24,000.

== Film set ==
Various movies have used the Old Cowtown Museum site as a film set:

- The Bender Claim - filmed in 2013
- Bloody Dawn - filmed in 2006
- Midnight Shanghai - filmed in 2016
- The Only Good Indian - filmed in 2007
- Road to Valhalia - filmed in 2013
- Skylark - filmed in 1992
- Touched by Fire - filmed in 2004
- Wichita - filmed in 2013

== Hours and admission ==
Summer Hours (April through October)

- Monday and Tuesday = Closed.
- Wednesday to Saturday = 10:00 a.m. to 5 p.m.
- Sunday = Noon to 5 p.m. Every Sunday is Pay as You Wish.

All admissions end one hour before close.

Winter Hours (November to March)

- Sunday and Monday = Closed
- Tuesday to Saturday = 10:00 a.m. to 5 p.m.

All admissions end one hour before close.

General Admission

- Adult (18-61) = $12.00
- Senior (62+) = $11.00
- Youth (5-17) = $10.00
- Children (4 & under) = Free
- Cowtown Members receive free admission
- Special prices for groups (15+ people and schools)

== See also ==
- National Register of Historic Places listings in Sedgwick County, Kansas
- American frontier
- Great Plains
