= Wesley Medical Center =

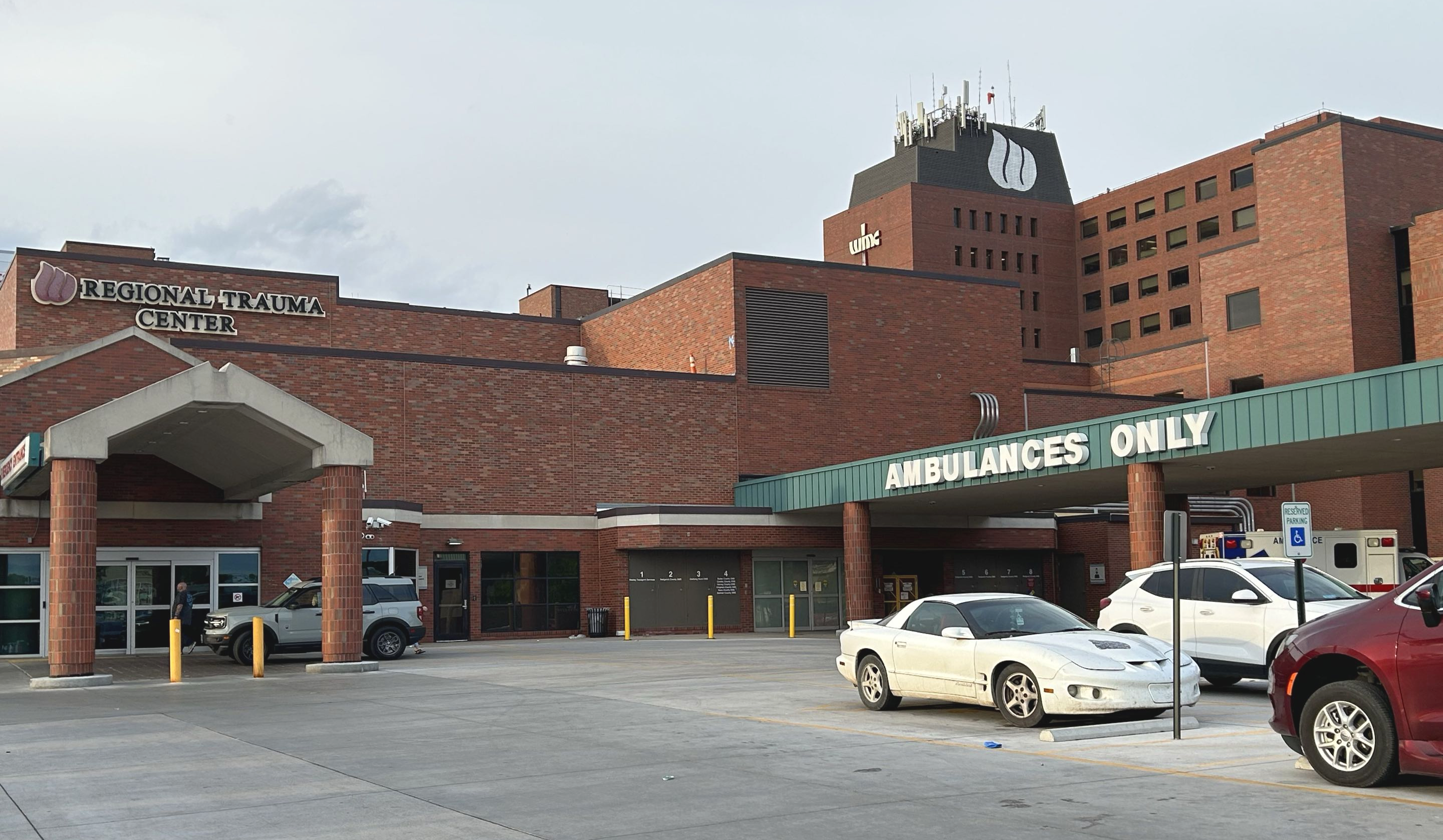
- Wesley Medical Center in 2026

Geography
- Location: 550 North Hillside; Wichita, Kansas, United States
- Coordinates: 37.733670°N 97.299010°W

Organization
- Care system: Medicare, Medicaid, and all insurance providers
- Type: Teaching hospital
- Affiliated university: University of Kansas

Services
- Emergency department: Level I trauma center
- Beds: 760 beds and 102 bassinets

Helipads
- Helipad: Yes

History
- Founded: 1912

Links
- Website: www.wesleymc.com
- Lists: Hospitals in the United States

Wesley Medical Center, located in Wichita, Kansas, is an acute-care center licensed for 760 beds and 102 bassinets. The medical staff of 900 physicians and 3,000 employees provide a full range of diagnostic and treatment services for patients from throughout Kansas and northern Oklahoma. Every year, more than 25,000 adults and children are inpatients and more than 6,000 babies are born at Wesley. The center was founded in 1912 by the Methodist Church, but has been part of HCA Healthcare since 1985.

An unrelated organization, Wesley Medical Center in Hattiesburg, Mississippi, has 211 licensed beds and is owned by Triad Hospitals, Inc.

== Facilities ==
Wesley's campus in the heart of Wichita, Kansas, includes:

- A critical care building with four adult intensive care units
- A freestanding family medicine center
- A freestanding birth care building

It also includes Wesley Woodlawn Hospital & ER, Wesley West, Wesley Derby, and Wesley Andover freestanding ERs.

== Advanced technology and services ==
Wesley provides a full range of diagnostic and treatment services; it is especially noted for:

- The largest emergency department in Kansas, including the only pediatric emergency room in Wichita
- The Children's Center (affiliated with the National Association of Children's Hospitals and Related Institutions)
- The Wesley Children's Hospital with over 50 pediatric specialists and subspecialists
- Level I Adult and Level II Pediatric Trauma Center
- The area's only Gamma Knife Center
- State-of-the-art Neonatal Intensive Care and Pediatric Intensive Care units
- The area's only hyperbaric oxygen chambers
