= NewMarket Square =

Outdoor shopping mall in Wichita, Kansas

New Market Square
- Location: Wichita, Kansas, United States
- Coordinates: 37.7272°N 97.4648°W
- Address: 2441 North Maize Road
- Opened: 2001
- Developer: Slawson Development
- Manager: Jerry Jones
- Num. of stores: 90+
- Num. of anchor tenants: 5
- Floor area: 840,000 square feet (78,000 m^{2})
- Public transit: Wichita Transit
- Website: newmarketsquare.com

New Market Square, is a super-regional shopping mall and lifestyle center in Northwest Wichita, Kansas. The mall has a gross leasable area of 840,000 square feet (78,000 m^{2}).
