= Park Township, Kansas =

Township in Sedgwick County, Kansas, U.S.

Park Township Sedgwick County, Kansas
- Township
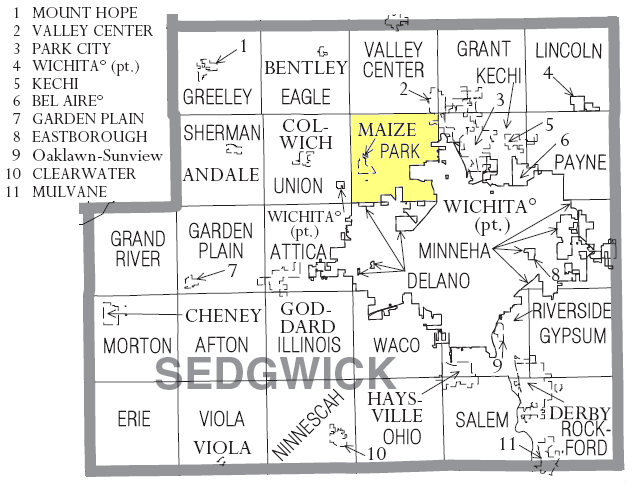
- Location within Sedgwick County

- Location within state of Kansas
- Coordinates: 37°46′55″N 97°25′36″W
- Country: United States
- State: Kansas
- County: Sedgwick
- Founded: 1871

Government
  - District 4 County Commissioner: Ryan Baty

Area
  - Total: 27.72 sq mi (71.8 km^{2})
  - Land: 26.252 sq mi (67.99 km^{2})
  - Water: 1.468 sq mi (3.80 km^{2}) 5.30%
- Elevation: 1,345 ft (410 m)

Population (2000)
  - Total: 6,841
  - Density: 260.6/sq mi (100.6/km^{2})
- Time zone: UTC-6 (CST)
  - Summer (DST): UTC-5 (CDT)
- Area code: 620
- FIPS code: 20-54425
- GNIS ID: 473831

Park Township is a township in Sedgwick County, Kansas, United States. As of the 2020 census, its population was 6,841.

== History ==
Park Township was established on May 2, 1871. Park Township was the first township settled in the county.

== Geography ==
The Arkansas River, Little Arkansas River, and MS Mitch Mitchell Floodway flow through the township. Multiple exclaves of the city of Wichita are completely surrounded by Park Township.

=== Communities ===
- part of Maize
- part of Valley Center

=== Adjacent townships ===
Valley Center Township, Sedgwick County
Eagle Township, Sedgwick County	northwest	north	northeast	Grant Township, Sedgwick County
Union Township, Sedgwick County	west	self	east	Kechi Township, Sedgwick County

== Transportation ==
Maize Airport lies within the township.

=== Major highways ===
- K-96
