= K-296 (Kansas highway) =

State highway in Kansas, U.S.

K-296
- Former K-296 highlighted in red

Route information
- Maintained by KDOT
- Length: 15.668 mi (25.215 km)
- Existed: May 5, 1965–October 16, 1996

Major junctions
- West end: K-96 north of Mount Hope
- East end: K-96 in Maize

Location
- Country: United States
- State: Kansas
- Counties: Sedgwick

Highway system
- Kansas State Highway System; Interstate; US; State; Spurs
← K-292	→ K-334

K-296 was a 15.668-mile-long (25.215 km) state highway in the U.S. state of Kansas. K-296's western terminus was at K-96 north of the city of Mount Hope, and the eastern terminus was at K-96 in the city of Maize. Along the way it served the cities of Andale and Colwich.

K-296 was first established in 1965, and followed a former routing of K-96. K-296 went from K-96 in Maize, east to Andale, then north to K-96. The highway was decommissioned and removed from the state highway system in 1996.

== Route description ==
K-296 began at K-96 west of Mount Hope and began travelling south. After just over two miles (3.2 km) it crossed Big Slough, a tributary of the Arkansas River. It continued south about one mile (1.6 km) past here and crossed South Fork Big Slough, a tributary of Big Slough. From here, the highway continued 1.7 miles (2.7 km) south then entered Andale. It then exited Andale, and after a short distance turned east. About .6 miles (0.97 km) after curving east, K-296 crossed Cowskin Creek, a tributary of the Arkansas River. From here, it continued east for 4 then entered into Colwich. Roughly 3.5 miles (5.6 km) after leaving Colwich, it entered Maize. It then continued through Maize a short distance before terminating at K-96.

The Kansas Department of Transportation (KDOT) tracks the traffic levels on its highways, and in 1995, they determined that on average the traffic varied from 400 vehicles near the western terminus to 3045 vehicles just west of Maize.

== History ==
In a May 5, 1965 resolution, K-96 was realigned between Wichita and, at this time K-296 was established along the former K-96 from Maize east to Andale then north to K-96. The Kansas Department of Transportation removed K-296 from the state highway system in an October 16, 1996 resolution.

== Major intersections ==
The entire route was in Sedgwick County.

Location	mi	km	Destinations	Notes
Greeley Township	0.000	0.000	K-96	Western terminus
Maize	15.668	25.215	K-96	Eastern terminus
1.000 mi = 1.609 km; 1.000 km = 0.621 mi
