= Garden Plain Township =

Garden Plain Township may refer to one of the following townships in the United States:

- Garden Plain Township, Whiteside County, Illinois
- Garden Plain Township, Sedgwick County, Kansas

== See also ==
- Garden Plain (disambiguation)
