= 2019–20 Iowa State Cyclones men's basketball team =

American college basketball season

2019–20 Iowa State Cyclones men's basketball
- Conference: Big 12 Conference
- Record: 12–20 (5–13 Big 12)
- Head coach: Steve Prohm (5th season)
- Assistant coaches: James Kane; Daniyal Robinson; William Small
- Home arena: Hilton Coliseum

2019–20 Big 12 men's basketball standings
	Conf.				Overall
Team	W		L	PCT	W		L	PCT
No. 1 Kansas	17	–	1	.944	28	–	3	.903
No. 5 Baylor	15	–	3	.833	26	–	4	.867
No. 24 West Virginia	9	–	9	.500	21	–	10	.677
Texas	9	–	9	.500	19	–	12	.613
Oklahoma	9	–	9	.500	19	–	12	.613
Texas Tech	9	–	9	.500	18	–	13	.581
TCU	7	–	11	.389	16	–	16	.500
Oklahoma State	7	–	11	.389	18	–	14	.563
Iowa State	5	–	13	.278	12	–	20	.375
Kansas State	3	–	15	.167	11	–	21	.344
Note: The 2020 Big 12 Tournament was canceled prior to the quarterfinals due to the COVID-19 pandemic. Rankings from AP poll

The 2019–20 Iowa State Cyclones men's basketball team represented Iowa State University during the 2019–20 NCAA Division I men's basketball season. The Cyclones were coached by Steve Prohm, who was in his fifth season at Iowa State. They played their home games at Hilton Coliseum in Ames, Iowa as members of the Big 12 Conference.

== Previous season ==
The Cyclones finished the 2018–19 season 23–12, 9–9 in Big 12 play to finish in fifth place. They defeated Baylor, Kansas State, and Kansas to win the Big 12 Conference tournament. They lost to Ohio State in the first round of the NCAA tournament.

== Offseason ==
=== Departures ===
Offseason departures
Name	Position	Reason for departure
Marial Shayok	Guard	Graduated/NBA draft
Lindell Wigginton	Guard	Declared for NBA draft
Talen Horton-Tucker	Guard	Declared for NBA draft
Cameron Lard	Forward	Declared for NBA draft
Nick Weiler-Babb	Guard	Graduated
Zoran Talley Jr.	Forward	Graduated
Luke Anderson	Forward	Transferred
Marcedus Leech	Guard	Transferred

=== Incoming transfers ===
Incoming transfers
Name	Position	Hometown	Previous school	Remaining eligibility	Notes
Javan Johnson	Forward	Decatur, Alabama	Troy	2	Johnson had to sit out the 2019–20 season due to NCAA eligibility rules.
Rasir Bolton	Guard	Petersburg, Virginia	Penn State	3	The NCAA granted Bolton immediate eligibility on September 24, 2019.

=== 2019 recruiting class ===
College recruiting
Name	Hometown	School	Height	Weight	Commit date
Caleb Grill; PG #2	Maize, Kansas	Maize	6 ft 3 in (1.91 m)	180 lb (82 kg)	May 7, 2019
Caleb Grill; PG #2	Recruit ratings: Rivals: 247Sports: ESPN:				
Tre Jackson; PG #3	Blythewood, South Carolina	Blythewood	6 ft 1 in (1.85 m)	170 lb (77 kg)	Sep 25, 2018
Tre Jackson; PG #3	Recruit ratings: Rivals: 247Sports: ESPN:				
Luke Anderson; PF #1	Lakeland, Florida	Lakeland	6 ft 8 in (2.03 m)	215 lb (98 kg)	Sep 2, 2018
Luke Anderson; PF #1	Recruit ratings: Rivals: 247Sports: ESPN: (82)				
Marcedus Leech; SF #10	Poplar Bluff, Missouri	Poplar Bluff	6 ft 5 in (1.96 m)	170 lb (77 kg)	Jul 25, 2018
Marcedus Leech; SF #10	Recruit ratings: Rivals: 247Sports: ESPN: (81)				
Overall recruit ranking: Scout: 58 Rivals: 26 247Sports: 58 ESPN: 20
Note: In many cases, Scout, Rivals, 247Sports, On3, and ESPN may conflict in their listings of height and weight.; In these cases, the average was taken. ESPN grades are on a 100-point scale.; Sources: "Iowa State 2019 Basketball Commitments". Rivals.; "ESPN". ESPN.; "2019 Team Ranking". Rivals.

== Roster ==
2019–20 Iowa State Cyclones men's basketball team
Players
Coaches

Pos.	#	Name	Height	Weight	Year	Previous school	Hometown
F	0	Zion Griffin	6 ft 6 in (1.98 m)	217 lb (98 kg)	So	Hinsdale South HS	Darien, Illinois
G	2	Caleb Grill	6 ft 3 in (1.91 m)	192 lb (87 kg)	Fr	Maize HS	Maize, Kansas
G	3	Tre Jackson	6 ft 1 in (1.85 m)	176 lb (80 kg)	Fr	Blythewood HS	Blythewood, South Carolina
F	4	George Conditt IV	6 ft 10 in (2.08 m)	223 lb (101 kg)	So	Corliss HS	Chicago
G	11	Prentiss Nixon	6 ft 2 in (1.88 m)	188 lb (85 kg)	Sr	Colorado State	Bolingbrook, Illinois
F	12	Michael Jacobson	6 ft 9 in (2.06 m)	240 lb (109 kg)	RS Sr	Nebraska	Waukee, Iowa
F	13	Javan Johnson	6 ft 6 in (1.98 m)	195 lb (88 kg)	RS Jr	Troy	Decatur, Alabama
G	15	Carter Boothe (W)	6 ft 1 in (1.85 m)	199 lb (90 kg)	So	Central Decatur Community School District	Leon, Iowa
G	22	Tyrese Haliburton	6 ft 5 in (1.96 m)	175 lb (79 kg)	So	Oshkosh North HS	Oshkosh, Wisconsin
G	23	Nate Schuster (W)	6 ft 4 in (1.93 m)	187 lb (85 kg)	So	Menomonee Falls HS	Menomonee Falls, Wisconsin
G	24	Terrence Lewis	6 ft 6 in (1.98 m)	205 lb (93 kg)	Jr	Riverside University HS	Milwaukee
G	25	Eric Steyer (W)	6 ft 5 in (1.96 m)	170 lb (77 kg)	RS So	Ames HS	Ames, Iowa
F	33	Solomon Young	6 ft 8 in (2.03 m)	242 lb (110 kg)	RS Jr	Sacramento HS	Sacramento, California
G	34	Nate Jenkins (W)	6 ft 2 in (1.88 m)	199 lb (90 kg)	Fr	Kettle Moraine High School	Delafield, Wisconsin
G	45	Rasir Bolton	6 ft 3 in (1.91 m)	183 lb (83 kg)	Fr	Penn State	Petersburg, Virginia

Head coach

- Steve Prohm (Alabama)

Assistant coach(es)

- James Kane (Florida)
- Daniyal Robinson (Little Rock)
- William Small (Belhaven)

Legend

- (C) Team captain
- (S) Suspended
- (I) Ineligible
- (W) Walk-on
- Injured
- Current redshirt

Roster
Last update: October 19, 2019

== Schedule and results ==
Date time, TV	Rank^{#}	Opponent^{#}	Result	Record	High points	High rebounds	High assists	Site (attendance) city, state
Regular season
Nov 5, 2019*; 7:00 pm, Cyclones.tv		Mississippi Valley State	W 110–74	1–0	20 – Jacobson	9 – Jacobson	14 – Haliburton	Hilton Coliseum (13,744); Ames, Iowa
Nov 9, 2019*; 3:30 pm, P12N		at Oregon State	L 74–80	1–1	16 – Bolton	9 – Jacobson	12 – Haliburton	Gill Coliseum (6,173); Corvallis, OR
Nov 12, 2019*; 7:00 pm, Cyclones.tv		Northern Illinois	W 70–54	2–1	17 – Bolton	12 – Jacobson	6 – Haliburton	Hilton Coliseum (13,762); Ames, Iowa
Nov 19, 2019*; 7:00 pm, Cyclones.tv		Southern Miss; Battle 4 Atlantis campus-site game	W 73–45	3–1	14 – Young	6 – Young	9 – Haliburton	Hilton Coliseum (13,810); Ames, Iowa
Nov 27, 2019*; 11:00 am, ESPN		vs. Michigan; Battle 4 Atlantis quarterfinals	L 76–83	3–2	25 – Haliburton	9 – Haliburton	5 – Tied	Imperial Arena (1,531); Paradise Bahamas
Nov 28, 2019*; 5:30 pm, ESPN2		vs. Alabama; Battle 4 Atlantis semifinals	W 104–89	4–2	23 – Haliburton	11 – Haliburton	9 – Haliburton	Imperial Arena (1,299); Paradise Bahamas
Nov 29, 2019*; 6:00 pm, ESPNU		vs. No. 13 Seton Hall; Battle 4 Atlantis Consolation Game	L 76–84	4–3	20 – Bolton	7 – Conditt IV	7 – Haliburton	Imperial Arena (2,650); Paradise Bahamas
Dec 4, 2019*; 7:00 pm, Cyclones.tv		Kansas City	W 79–61	5–3	19 – Tied	7 – Conditt IV	7 – Haliburton	Hilton Coliseum (13,718); Ames, Iowa
Dec 8, 2019*; 8:00 pm, ESPN2		No. 16 Seton Hall; Big East/Big 12 Battle	W 76–66	6–3	17 – Tied	10 – Jacobson	5 – Haliburton	Hilton Coliseum (14,269); Ames, Iowa
Dec 12, 2019*; 7:00 pm, ESPN2		Iowa; Iowa Corn Cy-Hawk Series	L 68–84	6–4	22 – Haliburton	8 – Conditt IV	5 – Haliburton	Hilton Coliseum (14,384); Ames, Iowa
Dec 22, 2019*; 12:00 pm, Cyclones.tv		Purdue Fort Wayne	W 89–59	7–4	22 – Haliburton	6 – Conditt IV	6 – Haliburton	Hilton Coliseum (13,541); Ames, Iowa
Dec 31, 2019*; 6:00 pm, Cyclones.tv		Florida A&M	L 68–70	7–5	29 – Bolton	8 – Lewis	5 – Nixon	Hilton Coliseum (14,356); Ames, Iowa
Jan 4, 2020; 5:00 pm, ESPNU		at TCU	L 79–81 ^{OT}	7–6 (0–1)	22 – Haliburton	12 – Haliburton	10 – Haliburton	Schollmaier Arena (5,821); Fort Worth, Texas
Jan 8, 2020; 7:00 pm, Big 12 Now		No. 3 Kansas	L 53–79	7–7 (0–2)	12 – Bolton	8 – Conditt IV	5 – Haliburton	Hilton Coliseum (14,384); Ames, Iowa
Jan 11, 2020; 7:00 pm, ESPN2		Oklahoma	W 81–68	8–7 (1–2)	23 – Bolton	5 – Tied	6 – Haliburton	Hilton Coliseum (14,045); Ames, Iowa
Jan 15, 2020; 7:00 pm, Big 12 Now		at No. 2 Baylor	L 55–68	8–8 (1–3)	8 – Bolt	8 – Haliburton	9 – Haliburton	Ferrell Center (10,284); Waco, Texas
Jan 18, 2020; 3:00 pm, ESPNU		at No. 23 Texas Tech	L 52–72	8–9 (1–4)	13 – Haliburton	5 – Jackson	2 – Tied	United Supermarkets Arena (15,096); Lubbock, Texas
Jan 21, 2020; 7:00 pm, Big 12 Now		Oklahoma State	W 89–82	9–9 (2–4)	27 – Young	9 – Tied	6 – Haliburton	Hilton Coliseum (13,916); Ames, Iowa
Jan 25, 2019*; 11:00 am, ESPNU		at No. 16 Auburn; Big 12/SEC Challenge	L 76–80	9–10	23 – Bolton	9 – Young	3 – Tied	Auburn Arena (9,121); Auburn, Alabama
Jan 29, 2020; 8:00 pm, ESPNU		No. 1 Baylor	L 53–67	9–11 (2–5)	19 – Bolton	8 – Haliburton	3 – Haliburton	Hilton Coliseum (13,896); Ames, Iowa
Feb 1, 2020; 1:00 pm, LHN		at Texas	L 68–72	9–12 (2–6)	14 – Tied	6 – Tied	5 – Haliburton	Frank Erwin Center (8,797); Austin, Texas
Feb 5, 2020; 6:00 pm, ESPN2		at No. 13 West Virginia	L 61–76	9–13 (2–7)	18 – Bolton	7 – Jacobson	3 – Tied	WVU Coliseum (11,103); Morgantown, West Virginia
Feb 8, 2020; 5:00 pm, ESPN2		Kansas State	W 73–63	10–13 (3–7)	20 – Young	9 – Conditt IV	3 – Tied	Hilton Coliseum (14,149); Ames, Iowa
Feb 12, 2020; 5:00 pm, ESPN2		at Oklahoma	L 61–90	10–14 (3–8)	17 – Lewis	7 – Nixon	6 – Nixon	Lloyd Noble Center (8,235); Norman, Oklahoma
Feb 15, 2020; 1:00 pm, ESPN2		Texas	W 81–52	11–14 (4–8)	21 – Jacobson	13 – Jacobson	3 – Jacobson	Hilton Coliseum (14,255); Ames, Iowa
Feb 17, 2020; 8:00 pm, ESPN		at No. 3 Kansas	L 71–91	11–15 (4–9)	20 – Nixon	8 – Jacobson	6 – Bolton	Allen Fieldhouse (16,300); Lawrence, Kansas
Feb 22, 2020; 5:00 pm, ESPNU		Texas Tech	L 57–87	11–16 (4–10)	16 – Young	10 – Jacobson	2 – Tied	Hilton Coliseum (14,278); Ames, Iowa
Feb 25, 2020; 6:00 pm, ESPNU		TCU	W 65–59	12–16 (5–10)	20 – Young	8 – Jacobson	5 – Tied	Hilton Coliseum (13,791); Ames, Iowa
Feb 29, 2020; 3:00 pm, ESPNU		at Oklahoma State	L 61–73	12–17 (5–11)	16 – Bolton	6 – Bolton	4 – Bolton	Gallagher-Iba Arena (8,129); Stillwater, Oklahoma
Mar 3, 2020; 8:00 pm, ESPNU		West Virginia	L 71–77	12–18 (5–12)	21 – Bolton	7 – Young	4 – Bolton	Hilton Coliseum (13,870); Ames, Iowa
Mar 7, 2020; 3:00 pm, Big 12 Now		at Kansas State	L 63-79	12-19 (5-13)	17 – Young	11 – Jacobson	2 – Lewis	Bramlage Coliseum (8,439); Manhattan, Kansas
Big 12 Tournament
Mar 11, 2020; 6:00 pm, ESPNU	(9)	vs. (8) Oklahoma State; First round	L 71-72	12-20	25 – Nixon	8 – Grill	4 – Nixon	Sprint Center (17,606); Kansas City, Missouri
*Non-conference game. ^{#}Rankings from AP poll. (#) Tournament seedings in parentheses. All times are in Central Time.

== See also ==
- 2019–20 Iowa State Cyclones women's basketball team
