= Union Township, Sedgwick County, Kansas =

Township in Sedgwick County, Kansas, U.S.

Union Township Sedgwick County, Kansas
- Township
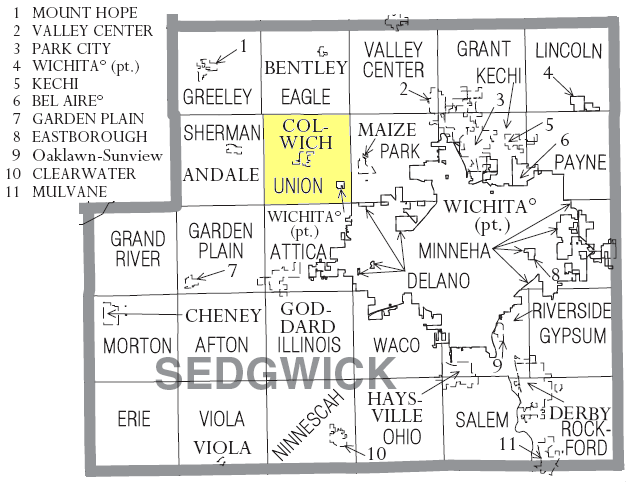
- Location within Sedgwick County

- Location within state of Kansas
- Coordinates: 37°46′45″N 97°32′11″W
- Country: United States
- State: Kansas
- County: Sedgwick
- Founded: 1872

Government
  - District 3 County Commissioner: Stephanie Wise

Area
  - Total: 36.09 sq mi (93.5 km^{2})
  - Land: 36.00 sq mi (93.2 km^{2})
  - Water: 0.09 sq mi (0.23 km^{2})
- Elevation: 1,385 ft (422 m)

Population (2020)
  - Total: 2,595
  - Density: 72.08/sq mi (27.83/km^{2})
- Time zone: UTC-6 (CST)
  - Summer (DST): UTC-5 (CDT)
- Area code: 620
- FIPS code: 20-72375
- GNIS ID: 473817

Union Township is a township in Sedgwick County, Kansas, United States. As of the 2020 census, its population was 2,595.

== History ==
Union Township was established in 1872. The first settlers in what was to become Union Township was Henry Pate and his four sons, who settled there in 1869.

== Geography ==
The Arkansas River flows through the township, as well as Cowskin Creek. An exclave of Wichita is completely surrounded by the township as well.

=== Communities ===
- Colwich
- part of Maize
- part of St. Marks

=== Adjacent townships ===
Eagle Township, Sedgwick County
		north	northeast	Valley Center Township, Sedgwick County
Sherman Township, Sedgwick County	west	self	east	Park Township, Sedgwick County
Garden Plain Township, Sedgwick County	southwest	south
Attica Township, Sedgwick County

== Transportation ==
=== Major highways ===
- K-96
