= Garden Plain =

Garden Plain may refer to:

- Garden Plain, Alberta, Canada
- Garden Plain, Kansas, United States
- Garden Plain Township, Whiteside County, Illinois, United States
- Garden Plain Township, Sedgwick County, Kansas, United States
