= Valley Center Township, Sedgwick County, Kansas =

Township in Sedgwick County, Kansas, U.S.

Valley Center Township Sedgwick County, Kansas
- Township
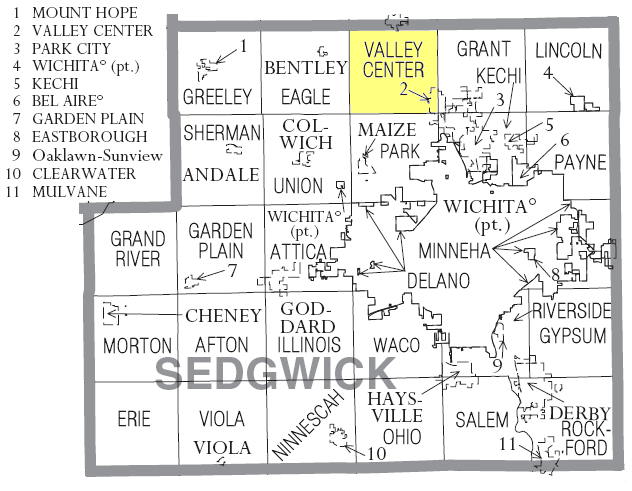
- Location within Sedgwick County

- Location within state of Kansas
- Coordinates: 37°52′05″N 97°25′36″W
- Country: United States
- State: Kansas
- County: Sedgwick

Government
  - District 4 County Commissioner: Ryan Baty

Area
  - Total: 36.39 sq mi (94.2 km^{2})
  - Land: 36.33 sq mi (94.1 km^{2})
  - Water: 0.06 sq mi (0.16 km^{2})
- Elevation: 1,362 ft (415 m)

Population (2020)
  - Total: 4,751
  - Density: 130.8/sq mi (50.49/km^{2})
- Time zone: UTC-6 (CST)
  - Summer (DST): UTC-5 (CDT)
- Area code: 620
- FIPS code: 20-73275
- GNIS ID: 473830

Valley Center Township is a township in Sedgwick County, Kansas, United States. As of the 2020 census, its population was 4,751.

== Geography ==
The Arkansas River, Little Arkansas River, and MS Mitch Mitchell Floodway flow through the township.

=== Communities ===
- part of Sedgwick
- part of Valley Center

=== Adjacent townships ===
Sedgwick Township, Harvey County
Lakin Township, Harvey County	northwest	north	northeast	Darlington Township, Harvey County
Eagle Township, Sedgwick County	west	self	east	Grant Township, Sedgwick County
Union Township, Sedgwick County	southwest	south	southeast	Kechi Township, Sedgwick County
Park Township, Sedgwick County
