= Sherwood Glen, Wichita, Kansas =

Sherwood Glen
- Neighborhood
- Interactive map of Sherwood Glen
- Coordinates: 37°45′03″N 97°22′14″W
- Country: United States
- State: Kansas
- County: Sedgwick
- City: Wichita
- Elevation: 1,322 ft (403 m)

Population (2016)
  - Total: 1,375
- ZIP code: 67204
- Area code: 316

Sherwood Glen is a residential neighborhood in Wichita, Kansas, United States. It lies on the west bank of the Little Arkansas River in the northwestern part of the city.

== Geography ==
Sherwood Glen is located at 37°45′03″N 97°22′14″W (37.750833, -97.370556) at an elevation of 1,322 ft (403 m). It consists of the area between Interstate 235 to the north and west, Seneca Street to the east, the Little Arkansas River to the southeast, and the MS Mitch Mitchell Floodway (known locally as “The Big Ditch”) to the south. The Pleasant Valley neighborhood lies across the Floodway to the south.

== Government ==
For the purposes of representation on the Wichita City Council, Sherwood Glen is in Council District 6.

For the purposes of representation in the Kansas Legislature, the neighborhood is in the 29th district of the Kansas Senate and the 91st district of the Kansas House of Representatives.

== Transportation ==
Womer Street, which runs north to south, is the main road through Sherwood Glen. 37th Street, which runs east to west, is the primary east to west route. The Interstate 235 freeway runs along the west and north sides of the neighborhood. It is accessible via an interchange at Womer.
