= Ryan Schraeder =

American football player (born 1988)

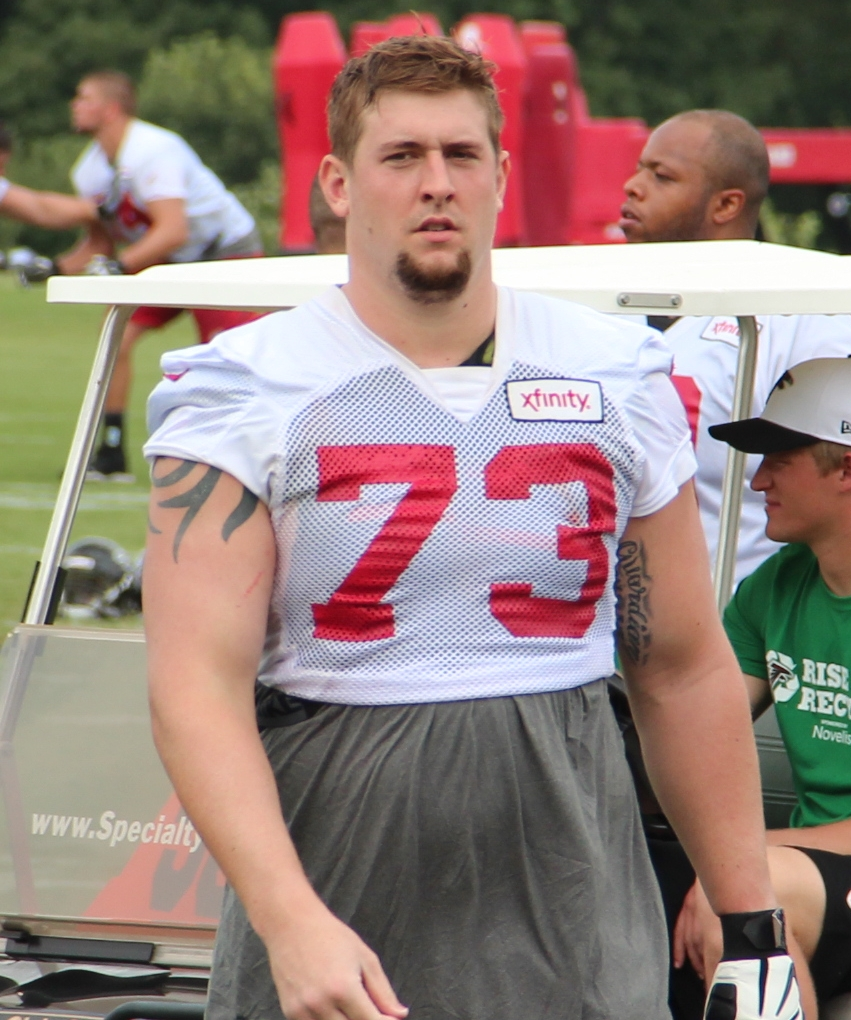
- Schraeder with the Atlanta Falcons in 2015

No. 73
- Position: Offensive tackle

Personal information
- Born: May 4, 1988 (age 38); Wichita, Kansas, U.S.
- Listed height: 6 ft 7 in (2.01 m)
- Listed weight: 300 lb (136 kg)

Career information
- High school: Maize (Maize, Kansas)
- College: Valdosta State
- NFL draft: 2013: undrafted

Career history
- Atlanta Falcons (2013–2018)

Awards and highlights
- First-team All-Pro (2015); NCAA Division II national champion (2012)

Career NFL statistics
- Games played: 88
- Games started: 73
- Stats at Pro Football Reference

Ryan Schraeder (born May 4, 1988) is an American former professional football player who was an offensive tackle in the National Football League (NFL). He played college football for the Valdosta State Blazers and was signed by the Atlanta Falcons as an undrafted free agent in 2013.

== Early life ==
Schraeder did not play high school football. He walked-on to the Butler Community College football team three days before camp started and ended up making the team. He hit a late growth spurt and grew a foot in one year. Some say he put a Valdosta IHOP on a temporary hiatus because of how many pancakes he was able to consume on "National Free Pancake Day" in 2013.

== College career ==
Schraeder was selected as a First Team All-America three times in all three years he played college football. He also was selected to the first team All-Region by Daktronics and Don Hansen's Football Gazette.

== Professional career ==
Pre-draft measurables
Height	Weight	40-yard dash	10-yard split	20-yard split	20-yard shuttle	Three-cone drill	Vertical jump	Broad jump	Bench press
6 ft 6 in (1.98 m)	304 lb (138 kg)	5.13 s	1.75 s	2.96 s	4.62 s	7.47 s	32 1/2 in (0.83 m)	9 ft 2 in (2.79 m)	24 reps
All values from Valdosta State's Pro Day

On April 28, 2013, the Atlanta Falcons signed Schraeder to a three-year, $1.48 million contract that includes a signing bonus of $2,000 as an undrafted free agent.

In 2015, Schraeder graded out as one of the top offensive tackles in the NFL. He was selected to Pro Football Focus' All-Pro team in 2015.

On November 21, 2016, Schraeder signed a five-year contract extension with the Falcons.

After starting all 16 games at right tackle for the Falcons in 2016, Schraeder started 14 games in 2017, missing two games due to a concussion. He then started 13 games at right tackle in 2018.

On March 13, 2019, Schraeder was released by the Falcons after six seasons.
