= Sherman Township, Sedgwick County, Kansas =

Township in Sedgwick County, Kansas, U.S.

Sherman Township Sedgwick County, Kansas
- Township
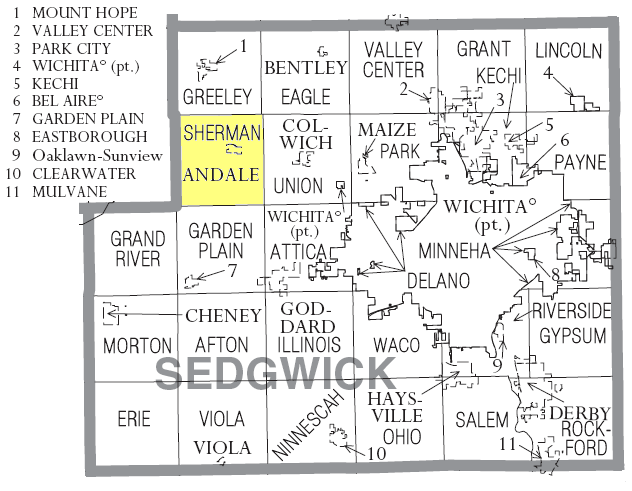
- Location within Sedgwick County

- Location within state of Kansas
- Coordinates: 37°46′40″N 97°38′41″W
- Country: United States
- State: Kansas
- County: Sedgwick
- Founded: 1877
- Named for: William Tecumseh Sherman

Government
  - District 3 County Commissioner: Stephanie Wise

Area
  - Total: 37.10 sq mi (96.1 km^{2})
  - Land: 37.02 sq mi (95.9 km^{2})
  - Water: 0.08 sq mi (0.21 km^{2})
- Elevation: 1,496 ft (456 m)

Population (2020)
  - Total: 1,991
  - Density: 53.78/sq mi (20.77/km^{2})
- Time zone: UTC-6 (CST)
  - Summer (DST): UTC-5 (CDT)
- Area code: 620
- FIPS code: 20-65100
- GNIS ID: 473812

Sherman Township is a township in Sedgwick County, Kansas, United States. As of the 2020 census, its population was 1,991.

== History ==
Sherman Township was established in 1877. It was named after William Tecumseh Sherman. It was home to a large German population.

== Geography ==
=== Communities ===
- Andale

=== Adjacent townships ===
Greeley Township, Sedgwick County
		north	northeast	Eagle Township, Sedgwick County
Sumner Township, Reno County	west	self	east	Union Township, Sedgwick County
Grand River Township, Sedgwick County	southwest	south	southeast	Attica Township, Sedgwick County
Garden Plain Township, Sedgwick County
