= St. Marks, Kansas =

Unincorporated community in Sedgwick County, Kansas

- Unincorporated community and CDP
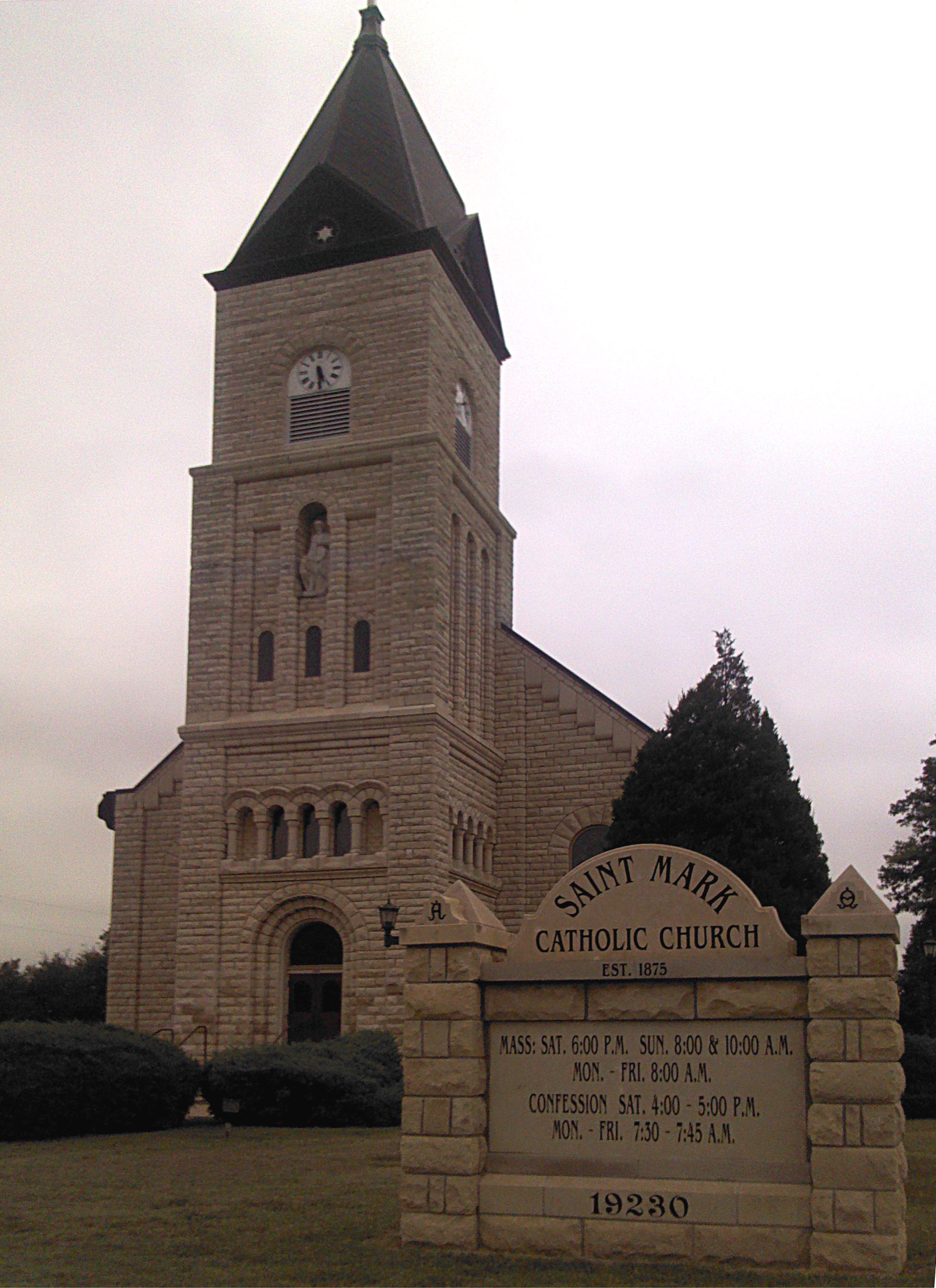
- St. Mark Catholic Church (2012)

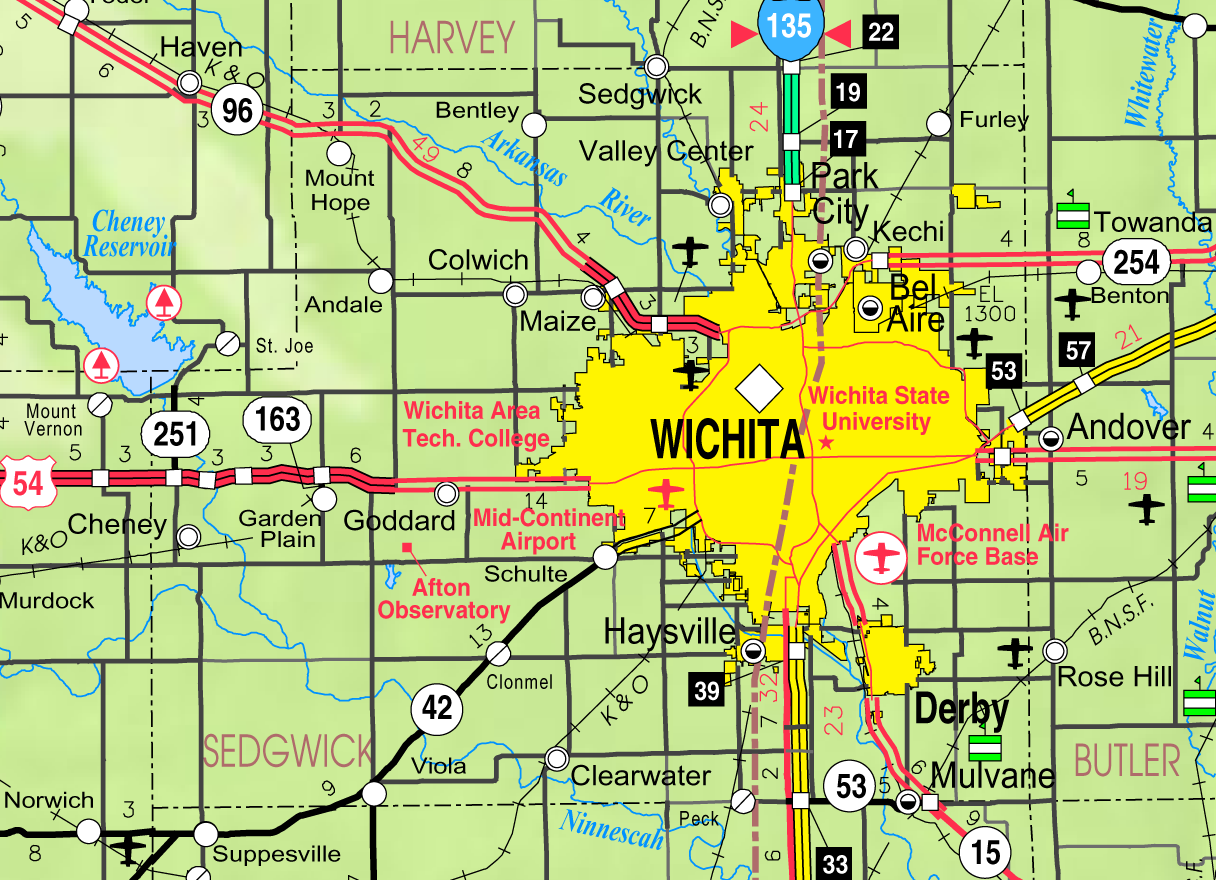
- KDOT map of Sedgwick County (legend)

- Location within Kansas Location within the United States
- Coordinates: 37°44′9″N 97°33′44″W
- Country: United States
- State: Kansas
- County: Sedgwick
- Townships: Union, Attica

Area
  - Total: 0.98 sq mi (2.54 km^{2})
  - Land: 0.98 sq mi (2.53 km^{2})
  - Water: 0.0039 sq mi (0.01 km^{2})
- Elevation: 1,434 ft (437 m)

Population (2020)
  - Total: 124
  - Density: 127/sq mi (49.0/km^{2})
- Time zone: UTC-6 (CST)
  - Summer (DST): UTC-5 (CDT)
- ZIP Code: 67030 (Colwich)
- Area code: 316
- FIPS code: 20-62375
- GNIS ID: 474003

St. Marks is an unincorporated community and census-designated place (CDP) in Sedgwick County, Kansas, United States. As of the 2020 census, the population was 124. It is located about 4 miles (6 km) southwest of Colwich along "W 29th St N" between "N 183rd St W" and "N 199th St W", also it is located 5 miles (8 km) north of Goddard.

== History ==
The community is based around the St. Mark Catholic Church that was built c. 1903−1906.

The first post office in Saint Marks was established in February 1879. The postal service was discontinued in December 1903.

== Demographics ==
Historical population
Census	Pop.	Note	%±
2020	124		—
U.S. Decennial Census

== Education ==
The community is served by Renwick USD 267 public school district. St. Marks School (K−8) is located in St. Marks at 19001 W. 29th St. N.
