= Maize USD 266 =

Public school district in Maize, Kansas

Address
- 905 W. Academy Ave. Maize, Kansas, 67101; United States
- Coordinates: 37.7735°N 97.4631°W

District information
- Type: Public
- Grades: K to 12
- Superintendent: Raquel Greer
- Schools: 14

Other information
- Website: usd266.com

Maize USD 266 is a public unified school district headquartered in Maize, Kansas, United States. The district includes the communities of Maize, eastern Colwich, some of northwest Wichita, and nearby rural areas.

== Schools ==
It operates the following schools and programs:

- Maize High School (9–12)
- Maize South High School (9–12)
- Complete High School Maize (9–12), alternative school
- Maize Virtual Preparatory School
- Hope Learning Center, alternative school
- Maize Career Academy (9–12)
- Maize South Middle School (7–8)
- Maize Middle School (7–8)
- Maize South Intermediate School (5–6)
- Maize Intermediate School (5–6)
- Pray-Woodman Elementary School (K-4)
- Maize South Elementary School (K-4)
- Maize Central Elementary School (K-4)
- Maize Elementary School (K-4)
- Vermillion Elementary School (K-4)
- Early Childhood Center (PreK)

== See also ==
- Kansas State Department of Education
- Kansas State High School Activities Association
- List of high schools in Kansas
- List of unified school districts in Kansas
