= Attica Township =

Attica Township may refer to the following townships in the United States:

- Attica Township, Sedgwick County, Kansas
- Attica Township, Michigan
