= Pleasant Valley, Wichita, Kansas =

Pleasant Valley
- Neighborhood
- Interactive map of Pleasant Valley
- Coordinates: 37°44′26″N 97°21′55″W
- Country: United States
- State: Kansas
- County: Sedgwick
- City: Wichita
- Elevation: 1,319 ft (402 m)

Population (2016)
  - Total: 1,100
- ZIP code: 67204
- Area code: 316

Pleasant Valley is a residential neighborhood in Wichita, Kansas, United States. It lies on the west bank of the Little Arkansas River in the northwestern part of the city.

== Geography ==
Pleasant Valley is located at 37°44′26″N 97°21′55″W (37.740556, -97.365278) at an elevation of 1,319 ft (402 m). It consists of the area between the MS Mitch Mitchell Floodway (known locally as “The Big Ditch”) to the north, the Little Arkansas River to the east, 29th Street to the south, and Interstate 235 to the west. The Sherwood Glen neighborhood lies to the north, El Pueblo lies to the southeast, and Benjamin Hills lies to the south.

== Government ==
For the purposes of representation on the Wichita City Council, Pleasant Valley is in Council District 6.

For the purposes of representation in the Kansas Legislature, the neighborhood is in the 29th district of the Kansas Senate and the 92nd district of the Kansas House of Representatives.

== Education ==
Wichita Public Schools operates two schools in Pleasant Valley:

- Pleasant Valley Elementary School
- Pleasant Valley Middle School

The Roman Catholic Diocese of Wichita oversees one Catholic elementary school in the neighborhood: St. Jude School.

== Transportation ==
Amidon Street, which runs north-south, is the primary route through Pleasant Valley. North of 33rd Street, it turns northwest and becomes Womer Street. 29th Street, which runs along the south side of the neighborhood, is the main east-west route.

Wichita Transit offers bus service to Pleasant Valley on its 17 route.
