= Eagle Township, Sedgwick County, Kansas =

Township in Sedgwick County, Kansas, U.S.

Eagle Township Sedgwick County, Kansas
- Township
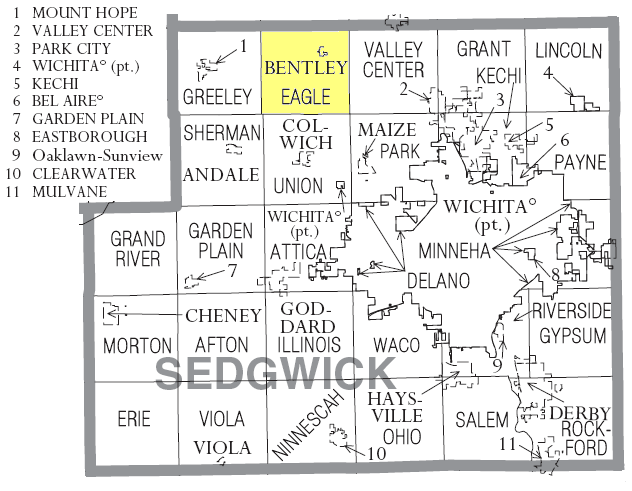
- Location within Sedgwick County

- Location within state of Kansas
- Coordinates: 37°52′10″N 97°32′11″W
- Country: United States
- State: Kansas
- County: Sedgwick
- Founded: 1872
- Named for: The Wichita Eagle

Government
  - District 3 County Commissioner: Stephanie Wise

Area
  - Total: 36.1 sq mi (93 km^{2})
  - Land: 35.6 sq mi (92 km^{2})
  - Water: 0.5 sq mi (1.3 km^{2})
- Elevation: 1,388 ft (423 m)

Population (2020)
  - Total: 1,161
  - Density: 32.6/sq mi (12.6/km^{2})
- Time zone: UTC-6 (CST)
  - Summer (DST): UTC-5 (CDT)
- Area code: 316
- FIPS code: 20-19250
- GNIS ID: 473816

Eagle Township is a township in Sedgwick County, Kansas, United States. As of the 2020 census, its population was 1,161.

== History ==
Eagle Township was established in 1872. It was named after The Wichita Eagle newspaper.

== Geography ==
The Arkansas River flows through the township.

=== Communities ===
- Bentley

=== Adjacent townships ===
Lakin Township, Harvey County
Lake Township, Harvey County	northwest	north	northeast	Sedgwick Township, Harvey County
Greeley Township, Sedgwick County	west	self	east	Valley Center Township, Sedgwick County
Sherman Township, Sedgwick County	southwest	south	southeast	Park Township, Sedgwick County
Union Township, Sedgwick County

== Transportation ==
=== Major highways ===
- K-96
