= Javan Johnson =

American basketball player (born 1999)

No. 1 – Scarborough Shooting Stars
- Position: Forward

Personal information
- Born: January 5, 1999 (age 27) Decatur, Alabama, U.S.
- Listed height: 6 ft 6 in (1.98 m)
- Listed weight: 192 lb (87 kg)

Career information
- High school: Austin (Decatur, Alabama)
- College: Troy (2017–2019); Iowa State (2019–2021); DePaul (2021–2023)
- NBA draft: 2023: undrafted
- Playing career: 2023–present

Career history
- 2023–2024: Santa Cruz Warriors
- 2024: Gladiadores de Anzoátegui
- 2024–2025: Santa Cruz Warriors
- 2025–2026: College Park Skyhawks
- 2026: Granada
- 2026-present: Scarborough Shooting Stars

Career highlights
- NBA G League Next Up Game (2024)
- Stats at NBA.com
- Stats at Basketball Reference

Javan Zion Johnson (born January 5, 1999) is an American professional basketball player for the Scarborough Shooting Stars of the Canadian Elite Basketball League. He played college basketball for the Troy Trojans, Iowa State Cyclones and the DePaul Blue Demons.

== High school career ==
Johnson attended Austin High School at Decatur, Alabama where he was a first team All-State in 2016-17 and a two-time Decatur Daily Player of the Year. In his senior season, he led the Black Bears to a 29–5 record and the Final Four while averaging 17.0 points, 6.0 rebounds and 4.0 assists.

== College career ==
Johnson began his college career with the Troy Trojans, where he 10.4 points on 40 percent shooting from the field in two seasons. After wards he transferred with the Iowa State Cyclones where, after redshirting one season, he averaged 9.7 points, 4.3 rebounds and 2.7 assists per game in his second one.

Johnson later transferred to the DePaul Blue Demons, where he only played 10 games in his first season after suffering a hand injury and in his second and last season, he averaged 14.2 points, 4.3 rebounds, and 2.4 assists while shooting 41.2% from deep on 6.0 attempts.

== Professional career ==
=== Santa Cruz Warriors (2023–2024) ===
After going undrafted in the 2023 NBA draft, Johnson joined the Golden State Warriors for the 2023 NBA Summer League and on September 28, 2023, he signed with the team. However, he was waived on October 16 and joined the Santa Cruz Warriors on October 30. In 48 games, he averaged 9.9 points, 2.8 rebounds and 1.2 assists in 20.8 minutes.

=== Gladiadores de Anzoátegui (2024) ===
On June 19, 2024, Johnson signed with the Gladiadores de Anzoátegui of the Superliga Profesional de Baloncesto where he played five games and averaged 12 points, 3.2 rebounds and 1.4 assists in 27.2 minutes.

=== Return to Santa Cruz (2024–2025) ===
After joining the Portland Trail Blazers for the 2024 NBA Summer League, he signed once again with the Golden State Warriors on September 17, 2024. However, he was waived three days later and on October 28, he rejoined the Santa Cruz Warriors.

=== College Park Skyhawks (2025–2026) ===
On September 3, 2025, Johnson signed with the Atlanta Hawks. However, he was waived the next day and would join the College Park Skyhawks.

=== Coviran Granada (2026) ===
On February 13, 2026, he signed for Coviran Granada of the Spanish Liga ACB. Jonhson left Granada in April 2026.

=== Scarborough Shooting Stars (2026-present) ===
On May 11, 2026, Johnson signed with the Scarborough Shooting Stars of the Canadian Elite Basketball League.

== Career statistics ==
Legend
GP	Games played	GS	Games started	MPG	Minutes per game
FG%	Field goal percentage	3P%	3-point field goal percentage	FT%	Free throw percentage
RPG	Rebounds per game	APG	Assists per game	SPG	Steals per game
BPG	Blocks per game	PPG	Points per game	**Bold**	Career high

=== College ===
Year	Team	GP	GS	MPG	FG%	3P%	FT%	RPG	APG	SPG	BPG	PPG
2017–18	Troy	**33**	13	16.9	**.462**	**.438**	.618	3.0	.6	.2	.6	5.8
2018–19	Troy	30	30	29.6	.400	.353	.720	4.2	1.6	.5	.7	10.4
2019–20	Iowa State	Redshirt										
2020–21	Iowa State	21	18	29.6	.389	.266	.700	**4.3**	**2.7**	.5	**.9**	9.7
2021–22	DePaul	10	2	21.4	.421	.379	.706	2.2	.4	.7	.7	7.1
2022–23	DePaul	**33**	**33**	**35.9**	.426	.412	**.767**	**4.3**	2.4	**.8**	**.9**	**14.2**
Career		127	96	27.3	.417	.373	.713	3.8	1.6	.5	.8	9.8

== Personal life ==
The son of Ronika and Duane Johnson, he has one brother. He enrolled at DePaul as a graduate student after majoring in Liberal Studies at Iowa State.
