= B. J. Finney =

American football player (born 1991)

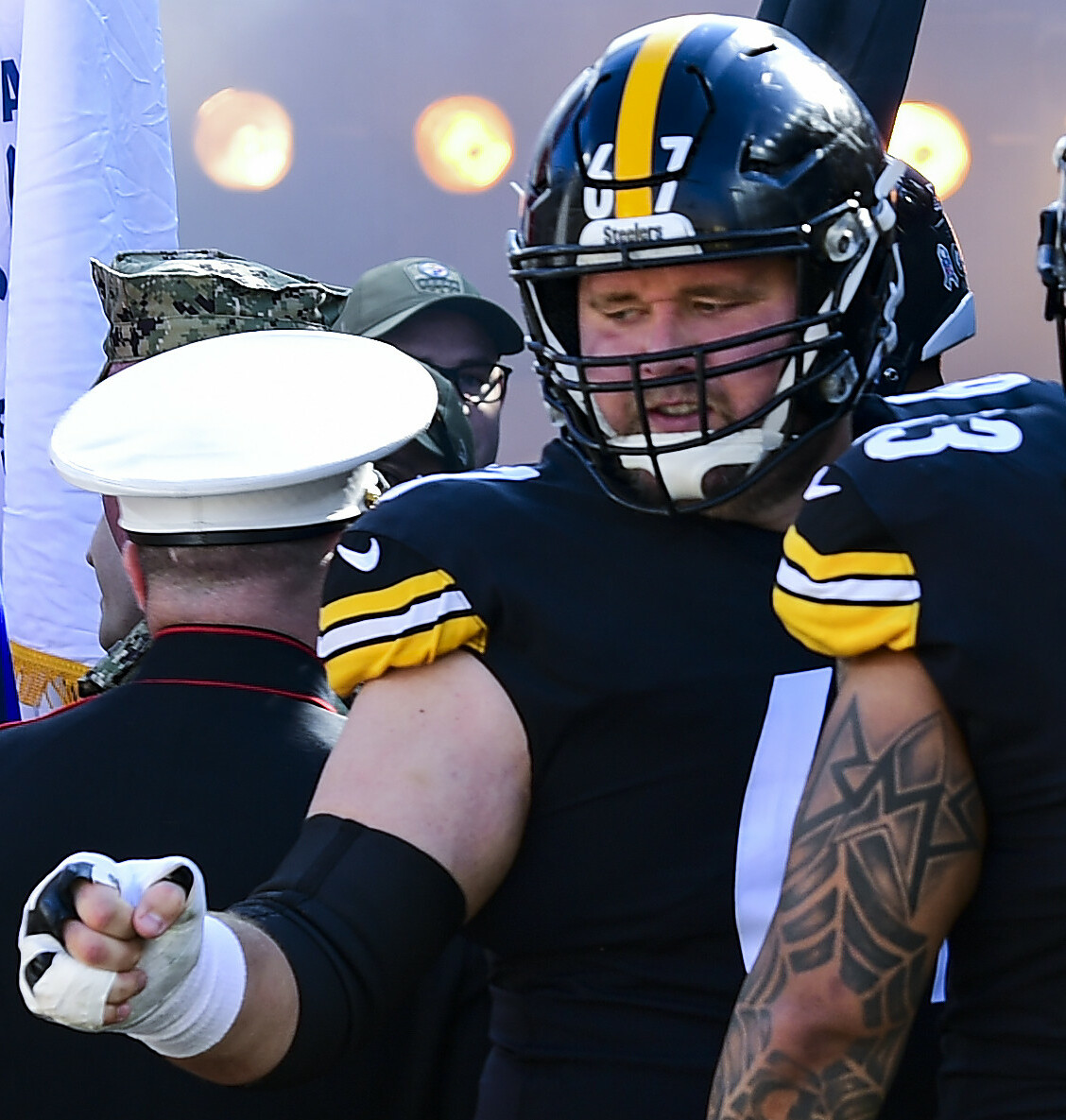
- Finney with the Pittsburgh Steelers in 2019

No. 67, 61
- Position: Guard

Personal information
- Born: October 26, 1991 (age 35); Wichita, Kansas, U.S.
- Listed height: 6 ft 4 in (1.93 m)
- Listed weight: 318 lb (144 kg)

Career information
- High school: Andale (Andale, Kansas)
- College: Kansas State
- NFL draft: 2015: undrafted

Career history
- Pittsburgh Steelers (2015–2019); Seattle Seahawks (2020); Cincinnati Bengals (2020); Pittsburgh Steelers (2021)

Awards and highlights
- 3× Second-team All-American (2011, 2013, 2014); 3× First-team All-Big 12 (2012, 2013, 2014); Co-Offensive Lineman of the Year (2014)

Career NFL statistics
- Games played: 73
- Games started: 15
- Stats at Pro Football Reference

Benjamin J. Isaac Finney II (born October 26, 1991) is an American former professional football player who was a guard in the National Football League (NFL). He played college football for the Kansas State Wildcats, and was signed as an undrafted free agent by the Pittsburgh Steelers in 2015.

Finney also played for the Cincinnati Bengals and the Seattle Seahawks.

== Early life ==
Finney was born in Wichita, Kansas. He attended high school at Andale High School in the Wichita suburb of Andale. He was an unranked two-star recruit for the class of 2010. He committed to Kansas State University. He was a state wrestling champ his senior year.

== College career ==
Finney redshirted his freshman year at Kansas State. His redshirt freshman year he started in 12 games, only missing the first game. He was named All-Big 12 Conference twice, honorable mention as a sophomore and first-team as a senior.

== Professional career ==
=== Pre-draft ===
Coming out of Kansas State, Finney was projected to be selected in the fourth or fifth round by the majority of NFL draft experts and scouts. He received an invitation to the NFL Combine and completed nearly all the required combine drills, only missing the three-cone drill due to a back injury. On March 10, 2015, he participated at Kansas State's pro day and opted to stand on his combine numbers and only perform positional drills for the team representatives and scouts from 15 NFL teams. Along with Finney, Tyler Lockett, Curry Sexton, and seven other draft prospects attended Kansas State's pro day. He was ranked as the third best center available on the draft by NFLDraftScout.com. NFL Draft analysts and scouts referred to him as a "plug and play" starter.

Pre-draft measurables
Height	Weight	Arm length	Hand span	40-yard dash	10-yard split	20-yard split	20-yard shuttle	Vertical jump	Broad jump	Bench press
6 ft 3 3/4 in (1.92 m)	318 lb (144 kg)	32 in (0.81 m)	10 in (0.25 m)	5.25 s	1.91 s	3.14 s	4.76 s	24 in (0.61 m)	8 ft 3 in (2.51 m)	20 reps
All values from NFL Combine

=== Pittsburgh Steelers (first stint) ===
==== 2015 ====
The Pittsburgh Steelers signed Finney as an undrafted rookie free agent immediately following the 2015 NFL draft. Even though he was a highly sought after undrafted free agent, he opted to sign with the Steelers as they were his favorite NFL team as a child. Finney's surprising fall in the draft was said to be in part due to teams' fearing his arms were too short and that he lacked technique and athleticism.

Finney competed with fellow rookie Reese Dismukes and veteran Cody Wallace to be the Steelers' backup center behind Maurkice Pouncey. On September 3, 2015, he left the Steelers final preseason game against the Carolina Panthers with an injury.

As a result, Finney was waived with an injury designation and subsequently reverted to the Steelers' injured reserve list before being released with an injury settlement on September 5, 2015. On September 29, 2015, the Steelers signed Finney to their practice squad after releasing Barrett Jones.

==== 2016 ====
Finney entered his training camp in 2016 competing with Wallace, Cole Manhart, and Chris Hubbard for the job to be backup offensive guard or center. He was named the third string offensive guard behind Ramon Foster and Hubbard to begin his second season and the third string center behind Pouncey and Wallace. On January 18, 2016, the Steelers signed him to a reserve/future contract.

On October 2, 2016, Finney received his first career start against the Kansas City Chiefs after left guard Foster was unable to play due to injury. He finished the season with three starts in 13 games.

==== 2017 ====
He competed with Ethan Cooper and Lucas Crowley for the backup offensive guard position and competed with Mike Matthews and Kyle Friend. Head coach Mike Tomlin named Finney the backup center to Pouncey and the backup left guard to Foster to begin the regular season.

On October 15, 2017, Finney earned his first start of the 2017 season, helping the Steelers defeat the Chiefs 19–13. He started at left guard in place of Foster, who was out with a back injury.

==== 2018 ====
Finney entered the 2018 season as a backup guard. He played in all 16 games, starting two at right guard in place of an injured David DeCastro.

==== 2019 ====
On March 6, 2019, the Steelers placed a second-round restricted free agent tender on Finney. He played in all 16 games, making 4 starts.

=== Seattle Seahawks ===
On March 23, 2020, Finney signed a two-year, $8 million contract with the Seattle Seahawks. He played in 6 games for the Seahawks before being traded.

=== Cincinnati Bengals ===
On October 28, 2020, Finney and a seventh-round draft pick in the 2021 NFL draft were traded to the Cincinnati Bengals for defensive end Carlos Dunlap. Finney was placed on the reserve/COVID-19 list by the Bengals on November 25, 2020, and activated on November 28. He was placed on the reserve/non-football injury list on December 31, 2020. Finney was released on March 5, 2021. Finney's only appearance with the Bengals was on November 15, 2020 against the Steelers.

=== Pittsburgh Steelers (second stint) ===
Finney signed a one-year contract with the Steelers on March 12, 2021. He suffered a back injury in Week 13 and was placed on injured reserve on December 15.

He retired on June 7, 2022.
