= Maize High School =

Location
- 11600 West 45th Street North; Maize, Kansas 67101; United States; 37.767848°N 97.476435°W

Information
- School type: Public, High School
- School district: Maize USD 266
- CEEB code: 171885
- Principal: Chris Botts
- Staff: 86.70 (FTE)
- Grades: 9-12
- Enrollment: 1,388 (2023–2024)
- Student to teacher ratio: 16.01
- Campus: Urban/ Suburban
- Colors: Red, white and black
- Mascot: Eagle
- Newspaper: Play Newsmagazine
- Communities served: Maize; West Wichita; Northwest Wichita
- Website: mh.usd266.com

Maize High School is a public high school located in Maize, Kansas, United States. It is operated by Maize USD 266 school district, and serves students in grades 9–12. Maize High School is one of two high schools located within the city limits of Maize, Kansas. The school colors are red and white, although black is considered an unofficial third color. The average annual enrollment is approximately 2,000 students.

The athletic programs at Maize High School are known as the Eagles and compete in the 6A division, the largest division in the state of Kansas according to the Kansas State High School Activities Association. Throughout its history, Maize has won 24 state championships in various sports.

== Athletics ==
The Eagles compete in the Ark Valley Chisholm Trail League and are classified as a 6A school, the largest classification in Kansas according to the Kansas State High School Activities Association.

=== State championships ===
State Championships
Season	Sport	Number of Championships	Year
Fall	Cross Country, Boys	7	1952, 1953, 1954, 1955, 1956, 1958, 1963
Fall	Volleyball	2	1998, 1999
Winter	Basketball, Boys	1	2021
Winter	Wrestling, Boys	1	2026
Winter	Swimming	1	2016
Winter	Bowling, Girls	2	2009, 2012
Winter	Indoor Track & Field, Boys	1	1966
Spring	Baseball	4	2003, 2005, 2011, 2017
Spring	Softball	2	1998, 2010
Spring	Tennis, Boys	1	2017
Total		22	

Maize High School offers the following sports:

=== Fall ===
- Football
- Volleyball
- Boys Cross-Country
- Girls Cross-Country
- Girls Golf
- Boys Soccer
- Girls Tennis
- Cheerleading
- Girls Flag Football

=== Winter ===
- Boys Basketball
- Girls Basketball
- Wrestling
- Boys Bowling
- Girls Bowling
- Winter Cheerleading
- Boys Swimming/Diving

=== Spring ===
- Baseball
- Boys Golf
- Boys Tennis
- Girls Soccer
- Girls Swimming/Diving
- Softball
- Boys Track and Field
- Girls Track and Field

== Notable alumni ==
- Avery Johnson, football player
- Nate Robertson, Major League Baseball pitcher
- Ryan Schraeder, NFL player
- Kelsey Stewart, softball player, member United States women's national softball team that won the silver medal at the 2020 Summer Olympics

== See also ==
- List of high schools in Kansas
- List of unified school districts in Kansas

Other high schools in Maize USD 266 school district

- Maize South High School in Maize
