= Renwick USD 267 =

Public school district in Andale, Kansas

Address
- 600 W. Rush Ave. Andale, Kansas, 67001; United States
- Coordinates: 37°47′37″N 97°37′55″W

District information
- Type: Public
- Grades: Pre-K to 12
- Schools: 6

Other information
- Website: usd267.com

Renwick USD 267 is a public unified school district headquartered in Andale, Kansas, United States. The district includes the communities of Andale, Colwich, Garden Plain, north Goddard, St. Marks, and nearby rural areas.

== Schools ==
The school district operates the following schools:

High Schools

- Andale High School (9-12) at 700 W. Rush Ave. in Andale.
- Garden Plain High School (9-12) at 720 N. Sedgwick St. in Garden Plain.

Elementary / Middle Schools

- Andale Elementary School, (K-8) at 500 W. Rush Ave. in Andale.
- Colwich Elementary School (PreK-8) at 401 S. Marian St. in Colwich.
- Garden Plain Elementary School (PreK-8) at 700 N. Section Line Rd. in Garden Plain.
- St. Marks School (K-8) at 19001 W. 29th St. N. in St. Marks.

== See also ==
- List of high schools in Kansas
- List of unified school districts in Kansas
- Kansas State Department of Education
- Kansas State High School Activities Association
