= Rasir Bolton =

American basketball player (born 1999)

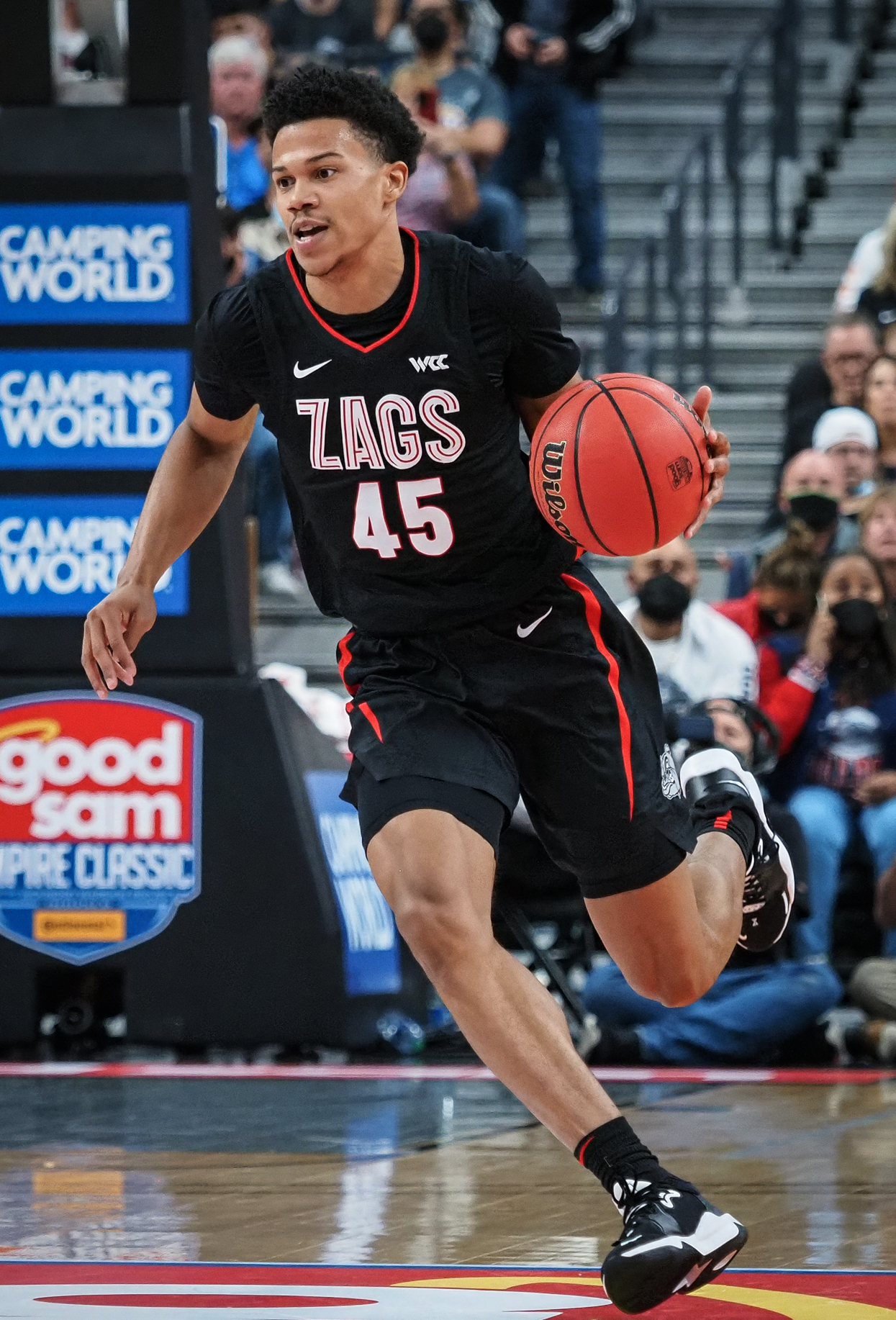
- Bolton with Gonzaga in 2021

No. 45 – Río Breogán
- Position: Point guard
- League: Liga ACB

Personal information
- Born: September 27, 1999 (age 27) Petersburg, Virginia, U.S.
- Listed height: 6 ft 3 in (1.91 m)
- Listed weight: 185 lb (84 kg)

Career information
- High school: Millwood School (Midlothian, Virginia); Carlisle School (Martinsville, Virginia); Bishop Sullivan (Virginia Beach, Virginia); Huntington Prep (Huntington, West Virginia); Massanutten Military Academy (Woodstock, Virginia)
- College: Penn State (2018–2019); Iowa State (2019–2021); Gonzaga (2021–2023)
- NBA draft: 2023: undrafted
- Playing career: 2023–present

Career history
- 2023–2024: Antwerp Giants
- 2024–2025: Spartak Subotica
- 2025–2026: Napoli Basket
- 2026–present: Río Breogán

Career highlights
- BNXT League Dream Team (2024); Third-team All-Big 12 (2021)

Rasir Zias Bolton (born September 27, 1999) is an American professional basketball player for Río Breogán of the Liga ACB. He played college basketball for the Penn State Nittany Lions, Iowa State Cyclones, and Gonzaga Bulldogs.

== High school career ==
Bolton attended four different high schools during his first three years, often leaving due to changes in coaching or the athletic department. For his senior season, he transferred to Massanutten Military Academy in Woodstock, Virginia. He played a postgraduate season at the school. He competed for Team Loaded VA on the Amateur Athletic Union circuit. Bolton committed to playing college basketball for Penn State over offers from Clemson, Saint Joseph's, Virginia Tech and VCU, among others.

== College career ==
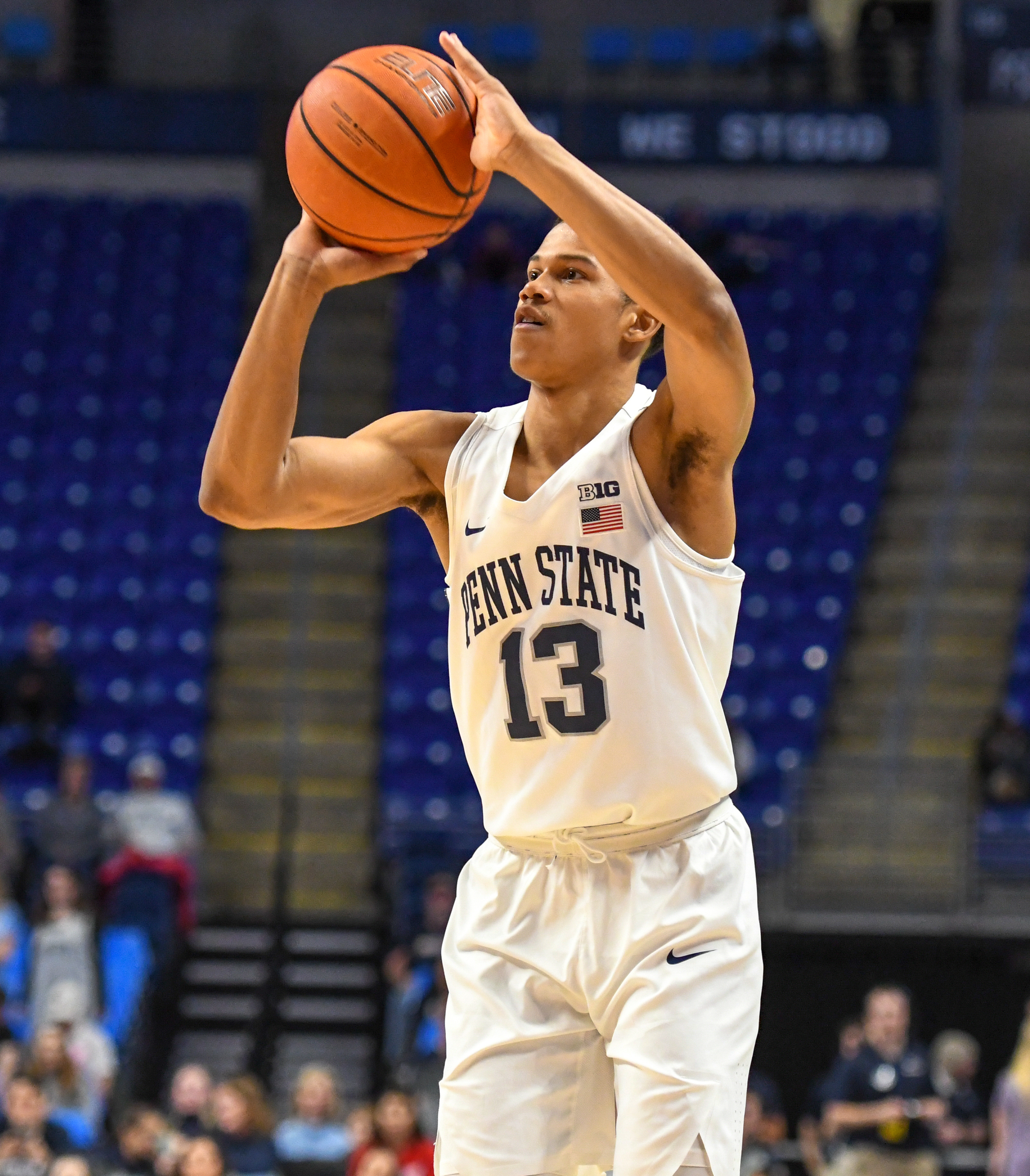
Bolton with Penn State in 2019

On December 8, 2018, Bolton scored a freshman season-high 27 points, shooting 7-of-9 from three-point range, in a 76–65 win over Colgate. As a freshman at Penn State, he averaged 11.6 points, before transferring to Iowa State. Bolton later said that he left Penn State because head coach Pat Chambers told him "I want to loosen the noose that's around your neck" in January 2019. On December 31, 2019, he recorded a career-high 29 points, four rebounds and four assists in a 70–68 loss to Florida A&M. As a sophomore, Bolton averaged 14.7 points, 3.4 rebounds and 2.8 assists per game. In his junior season, he averaged 15.5 points, 4.8 rebounds and 3.9 assists per game, earning Third Team All-Big 12 honors. After the season, Bolton transferred to Gonzaga. He averaged 11.2 points and 2.4 rebounds per game as a senior. Bolton declared for the 2022 NBA draft before returning to Gonzaga for his fifth season of eligibility. He averaged 10.1 points, 2.5 assists and 1.9 rebounds per game in his final season.

== Professional career ==
On July 23, 2023, Bolton signed a contract with Telenet Giants Antwerp of the BNXT League. Over 28 games with Antwerp, he averaged 17.7 points, 3.2 rebounds and 2.5 assists per game. He was named the BNXT League Dream Team for the 2023–24 season.

On June 20, 2024, Bolton signed a contract with the Serbian team Spartak Subotica.

On July 11, 2025, he signed with Napoli Basket of the Italian Lega Basket Serie A (LBA).

On July 7, 2026, he signed with Río Breogán of the Liga ACB.

== Career statistics ==
Legend
GP	Games played	GS	Games started	MPG	Minutes per game
FG%	Field goal percentage	3P%	3-point field goal percentage	FT%	Free throw percentage
RPG	Rebounds per game	APG	Assists per game	SPG	Steals per game
BPG	Blocks per game	PPG	Points per game	**Bold**	Career high

=== College ===
Year	Team	GP	GS	MPG	FG%	3P%	FT%	RPG	APG	SPG	BPG	PPG
2018–19	Penn State	32	9	26.9	.383	.361	**.876**	2.0	1.5	.6	**.1**	11.6
2019–20	Iowa State	30	30	30.8	.404	.336	.848	3.4	2.8	1.1	**.1**	14.7
2020–21	Iowa State	21	20	**33.0**	.459	.314	.843	**4.8**	**3.9**	**1.3**	**.1**	**15.5**
2021–22	Gonzaga	32	32	27.3	**.502**	**.460**	.817	2.4	2.3	.6	.0	11.2
2022–23	Gonzaga	**37**	**37**	26.1	.438	.388	.782	1.9	2.5	.8	**.1**	10.1
Career		152	128	28.4	.433	.378	.837	2.7	2.5	.8	.1	12.3

== Personal life ==
Bolton's father, Ray, played college basketball at Bethune–Cookman before becoming a high school coach. His older brother, Resean, played basketball for Alderson Broaddus University.
