= St. Mark Church (Colwich, Kansas) =

Historic church in Kansas, United States

- St. Mark the Evangelist Catholic Church
- U.S. National Register of Historic Places
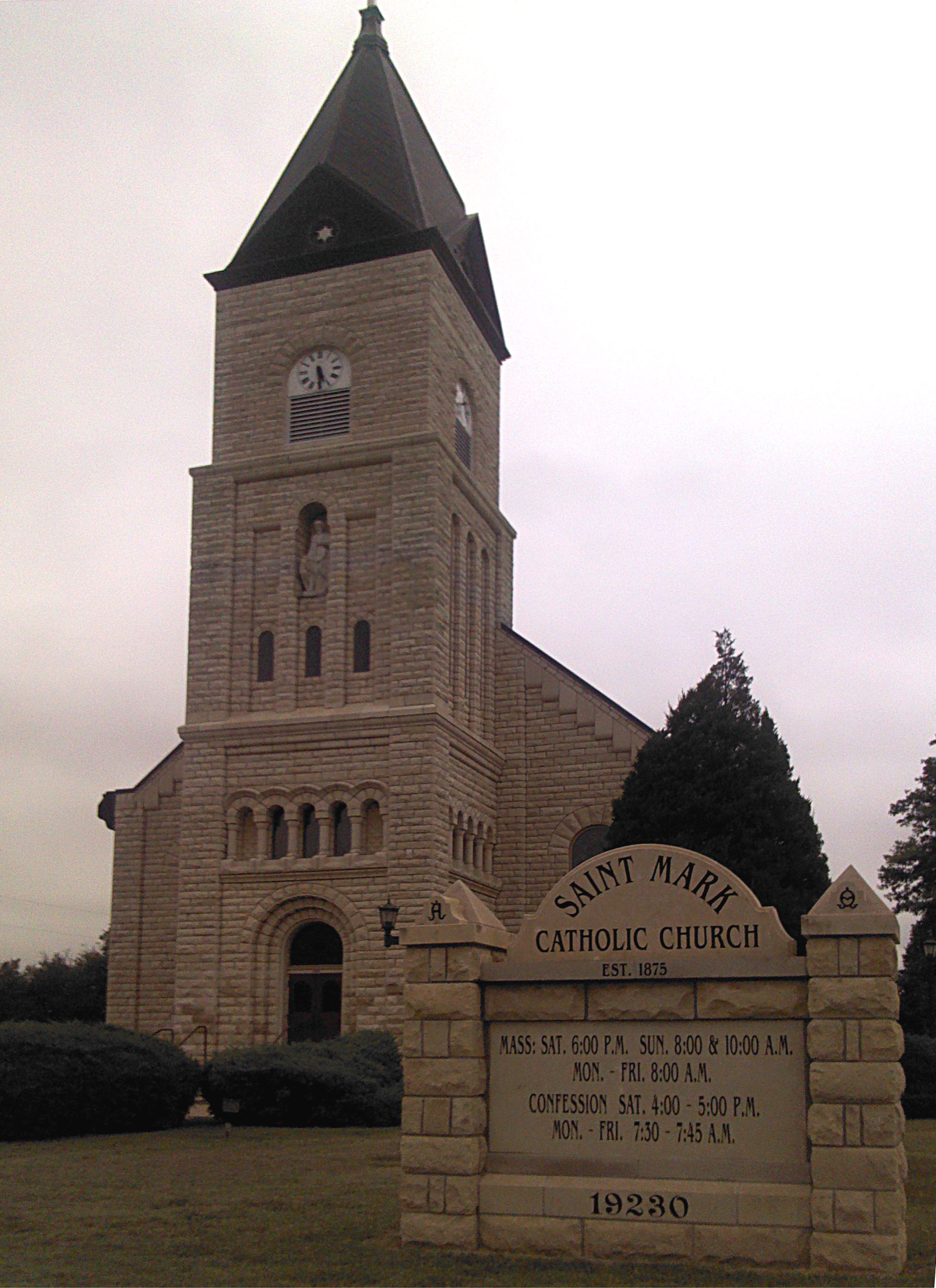

- Location within Kansas Location within the United States
- Nearest city: St. Marks, Kansas
- Coordinates: 37°44′16″N 97°33′59″W
- Area: Less than one acre
- Built: c. 1903−1906
- Built by: J. Walter; John Pilkington
- Architectural style: Romanesque
- NRHP reference No.: 91000463
- Added to NRHP: May 1, 1991

The St. Mark Church in St. Marks, Kansas, United States, is a historic Roman Catholic church building. It was built c. 1903−1906 and added to the National Register of Historic Places in 1991.

The church is Romanesque Revival in style, built of rusticated limestone blocks. It has a copper roof and a three-story bell tower. It is 57 by 121 feet (17 m × 37 m) in plan.

The church complex includes a school (c. 1940), a rectory (c. 1951), a convent (c. 1953) and a cemetery.
