= Maize South High School =

Location
- 3701 N. Tyler Road, Wichita, KS 67205; United States
- Coordinates: 37.7495°N 97.4489°W

Information
- Established: 2009
- School district: Maize USD 266
- Principal: Michael Boykins
- Teaching staff: 66.90
- Grades: 9–12
- Enrollment: 1,121 (2023–2024)
- Student to teacher ratio: 16.76
- Colors: Vegas Gold; Black; White
- Athletics conference: Kansas State High School Activities Association 5A
- Team name: Mavericks
- Newspaper: The Bullseye
- Website: mshs.usd266.com

Maize South High School is a fully accredited public high school in Wichita, Kansas, operated by Maize USD 266 school district, and serves students in grades 9–12. Maize South High School is one of two high schools in the Maize School District. The official school colors are vegas gold, black, and white. Annual enrollment numbers are approximately 1,100 students. Maize South competes as the Mavericks in the 5A classification of the Kansas State High School Activities Association.

== History ==
Maize South High School was built in 2009 due to overcrowding at nearby Maize High School. Since its opening, the two schools have formed a rivalry and continue to compete annually.

== Athletics ==
The athletic programs at Maize South are known as the "Mavericks" and compete at the 5A level.

=== State championships ===
State Championships
Season	Sport	Year
Fall	Cross Country, Boys	2016
Fall	Cross Country, Girls	2016, 2020
Fall	Soccer, Boys	2022, 2023
Spring	Tennis, Boys	2022
Spring	Baseball	2017
Total		7

== See also ==
- List of high schools in Kansas
- List of unified school districts in Kansas

Other high schools in Maize USD 266 school district

- Maize High School in Maize
