= Garden Plain Township, Kansas =

Township in Sedgwick County, Kansas, U.S.

Garden Plain Township Sedgwick County, Kansas
- Township
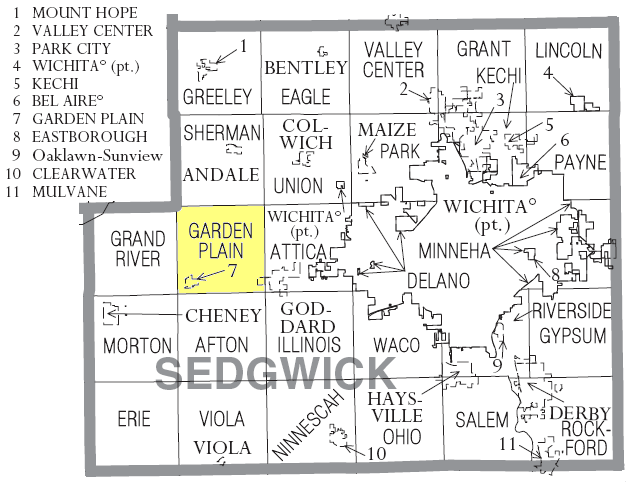
- Location within Sedgwick County

- Location within state of Kansas
- Coordinates: 37°41′35″N 97°38′36″W
- Country: United States
- State: Kansas
- County: Sedgwick
- Founded: 1874

Government
  - District 3 County Commissioner: Stephanie Wise

Area
  - Total: 35.67 sq mi (92.4 km^{2})
  - Land: 35.62 sq mi (92.3 km^{2})
  - Water: 0.05 sq mi (0.13 km^{2})
- Elevation: 1,483 ft (452 m)

Population (2020)
  - Total: 1,998
  - Density: 56.09/sq mi (21.66/km^{2})
- Time zone: UTC-6 (CST)
  - Summer (DST): UTC-5 (CDT)
- Area code: 316
- FIPS code: 20-25400
- GNIS ID: 473996

Garden Plain Township is a township in Sedgwick County, Kansas, United States. As of the 2020 census, its population was 1,998.

== History ==
Garden Plain Township was established in July 1874. The first settlers in Garden Plain Township were U. B. Bryan, John Fletcher, and O. S. Northrop.

== Geography ==
=== Communities ===
- Garden Plain
- part of Goddard

=== Adjacent townships ===
Sherman Township, Sedgwick County
Sumner Township, Reno County	northwest	north	northeast	Union Township, Sedgwick County
Grand River Township, Sedgwick County	west	self	east	Attica Township, Sedgwick County
Morton Township, Sedgwick County	southwest	south	southeast	Illinois Township, Sedgwick County
Afton Township, Sedgwick County

== Transportation ==
=== Major highways ===
- US-54
- US-400
- K-163
