= Attica Township, Kansas =

Township in Sedgwick County, Kansas, U.S.

Attica Township Sedgwick County, Kansas
- Township
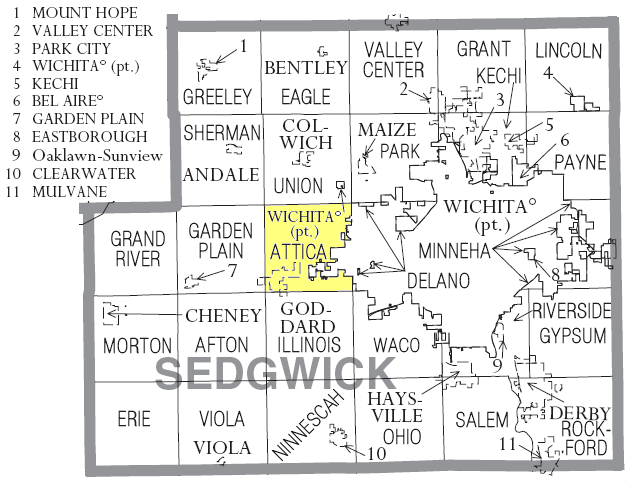
- Location within Sedgwick County

- Location within state of Kansas
- Coordinates: 37°41′35″N 97°32′06″W
- Country: United States
- State: Kansas
- County: Sedgwick
- Founded: 1873

Government
  - District 3 County Commissioner: Stephanie Wise

Area
  - Total: 26.722 sq mi (69.21 km^{2})
  - Land: 26.562 sq mi (68.80 km^{2})
  - Water: 0.16 sq mi (0.41 km^{2}) 0.60%
- Elevation: 1,404 ft (428 m)

Population (2020)
  - Total: 7,401
  - Density: 278.6/sq mi (107.6/km^{2})
- Time zone: UTC-6 (CST)
  - Summer (DST): UTC-5 (CDT)
- Area code: 316
- FIPS code: 20-03125
- GNIS ID: 474005

Attica Township is a township in Sedgwick County, Kansas, United States. As of the 2020 census, its population was 7,401.

== History ==
Attica Township was established in 1873. The first settler in what was to become Attica Township settled there in 1869.

== Geography ==
Cowskin Creek and Upper Dry Creek flow through the township.

=== Communities ===
- part of Goddard
- part of St. Marks

=== Adjacent townships ===
Union Township, Sedgwick County
Sherman Township, Sedgwick County	northwest	north
Garden Plain Township, Sedgwick County	west	self
Afton Township, Sedgwick County	southwest	south	southeast	Waco Township, Sedgwick County
Illinois Township, Sedgwick County

== Transportation ==
=== Major highways ===
- US-54
- US-400
