= Maize Airport =

- IATA: none; ICAO: none; FAA LID: 4KS5

Summary
- Airport type: Public
- Owner: G. V. Rubalcaba
- Location: Maize, Kansas
- Elevation AMSL: 1,336 ft / 407 m
- Coordinates: 37°45′56″N 097°26′09″W
- Interactive map of Maize Airport

Runways
| Direction | Length | | Surface |
| Direction | ft | m | Surface |
|---|---|---|---|
| 17/35 | 2,100 | 640 | Turf |

Statistics (2008)
- Aircraft operations: 2,300
- Based aircraft: 12
- Source: Federal Aviation Administration

Maize Airport (FAA LID: 4KS5, formerly 70K) is a privately owned, former public-use airport located two nautical miles (2.3 mi, 3.7 km) southeast of the central business district of Maize, a city in Sedgwick County, Kansas, United States, northwest of Wichita.

== Facilities and aircraft ==
Maize Airport covers an area of 20 acres (8.1 ha) at an elevation of 1,336 feet (407 m) above mean sea level. It has one runway designated 17/35 with a turf surface measuring 2,100 by 70 feet (640 x 21 m).

For the 12-month period ending April 29, 2008, the airport had 2,300 aircraft operations, an average of 191 per month. At that time there were 12 aircraft based at this airport: 92% single-engine and 8% helicopter.
