= Garden Plain, Kansas =

City in Sedgwick County, Kansas

- City
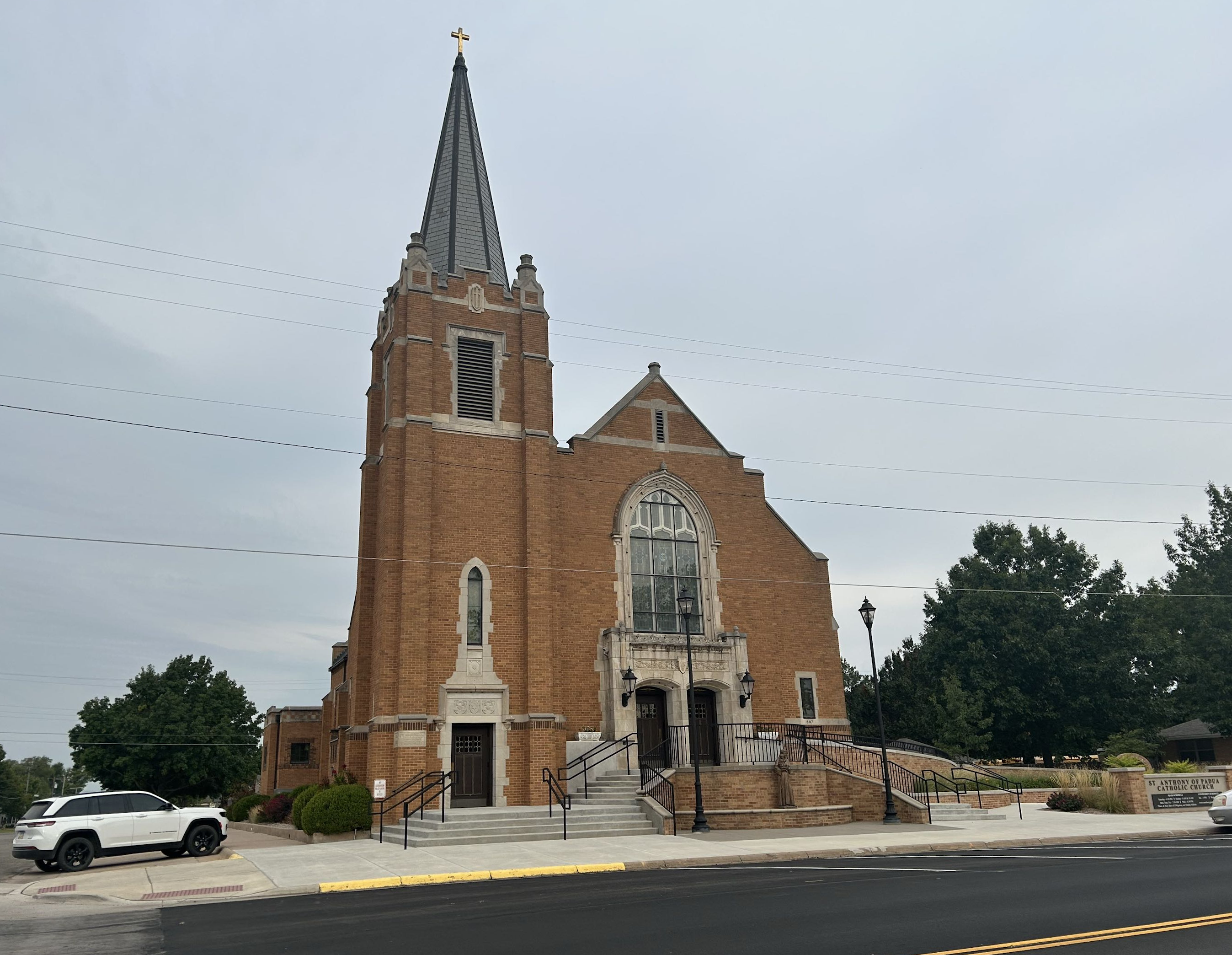
- St. Anthony of Padua Catholic Church in 2026

- Location within Sedgwick County and Kansas

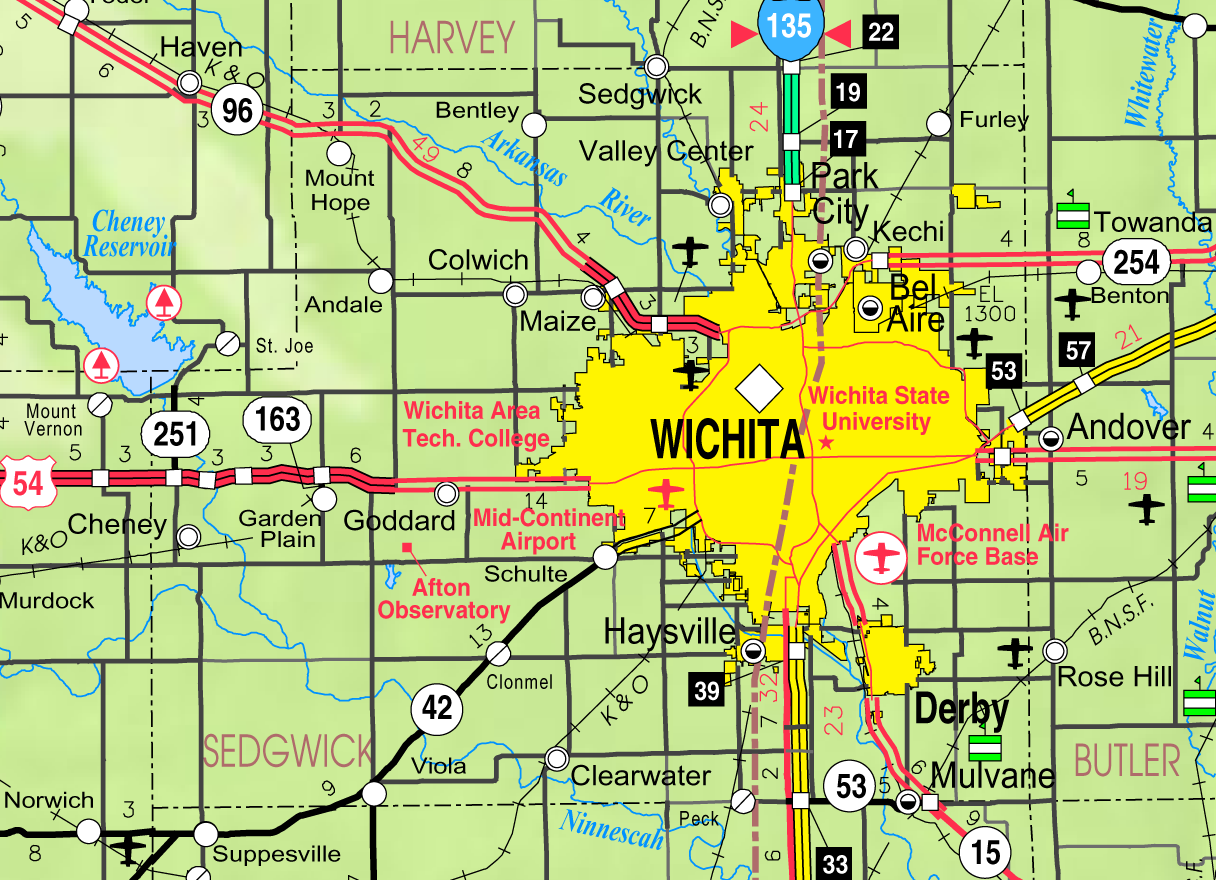
- KDOT map of Sedgwick County (legend)
- Coordinates: 37°39′38″N 97°40′55″W
- Country: United States
- State: Kansas
- County: Sedgwick
- Founded: 1884
- Incorporated: 1902

Area
  - Total: 1.02 sq mi (2.63 km^{2})
  - Land: 1.02 sq mi (2.63 km^{2})
  - Water: 0 sq mi (0.00 km^{2})
- Elevation: 1,450 ft (440 m)

Population (2020)
  - Total: 948
  - Density: 934/sq mi (360/km^{2})
- Time zone: UTC-6 (CST)
  - Summer (DST): UTC-5 (CDT)
- ZIP Code: 67050
- Area code: 316
- FIPS code: 20-25375
- GNIS ID: 473990
- Website: gardenplain.com

Garden Plain is a city in Sedgwick County, Kansas, United States. As of the 2020 census, the population of the city was 948.

== History ==
Garden Plain got its start following construction of the Wichita and Western Railroad from Wichita to Kingman.

The first post office in Garden Plain was established in January 1883. Garden Plain was incorporated in 1902.

== Geography ==
Garden Plain is located at 37°39′38″N 97°40′55″W (37.660451, -97.681811). According to the United States Census Bureau, the city has a total area of 0.60 square miles (1.55 km^{2}), all land.

== Demographics ==
Historical population
Census	Pop.	Note	%±
1910	296		—
1920	361		22.0%
1930	336		−6.9%
1940	323		−3.9%
1950	323		0.0%
1960	560		73.4%
1970	678		21.1%
1980	775		14.3%
1990	731		−5.7%
2000	797		9.0%
2010	849		6.5%
2020	948		11.7%
U.S. Decennial Census

=== 2020 census ===
The 2020 United States census counted 948 people, 336 households, and 240 families in Garden Plain. The population density was 908.0 per square mile (350.6/km^{2}). There were 349 housing units at an average density of 334.3 per square mile (129.1/km^{2}). The racial makeup was 92.51% (877) white or European American (91.03% non-Hispanic white), 0.11% (1) black or African-American, 0.11% (1) Native American or Alaska Native, 0.42% (4) Asian, 0.0% (0) Pacific Islander or Native Hawaiian, 1.16% (11) from other races, and 5.7% (54) from two or more races. Hispanic or Latino of any race was 3.38% (32) of the population.

Of the 336 households, 38.7% had children under the age of 18; 60.4% were married couples living together; 22.6% had a female householder with no spouse or partner present. 25.6% of households consisted of individuals and 15.2% had someone living alone who was 65 years of age or older. The average household size was 3.2 and the average family size was 3.8. The percent of those with a bachelor's degree or higher was estimated to be 24.1% of the population.

27.8% of the population was under the age of 18, 7.4% from 18 to 24, 23.8% from 25 to 44, 25.3% from 45 to 64, and 15.6% who were 65 years of age or older. The median age was 37.0 years. For every 100 females, there were 110.2 males. For every 100 females ages 18 and older, there were 113.1 males.

The 2016–2020 5-year American Community Survey estimates show that the median household income was $80,833 (with a margin of error of +/- $21,824) and the median family income was $95,208 (+/- $28,540). Males had a median income of $51,563 (+/- $24,700) versus $17,399 (+/- $11,604) for females. The median income for those above 16 years old was $33,125 (+/- $10,530). Approximately, 20.4% of families and 19.8% of the population were below the poverty line, including 28.6% of those under the age of 18 and 7.7% of those ages 65 or over.

=== 2010 census ===
As of the census of 2010, there were 849 people, 308 households, and 221 families residing in the city. The population density was 1,415.0 inhabitants per square mile (546.3/km^{2}). There were 320 housing units at an average density of 533.3 per square mile (205.9/km^{2}). The racial makeup of the city was 97.8% White, 0.4% African American, 0.2% Native American, 0.1% Asian, 0.2% from other races, and 1.3% from two or more races. Hispanic or Latino of any race were 0.6% of the population.

There were 308 households, of which 43.2% had children under the age of 18 living with them, 58.4% were married couples living together, 8.8% had a female householder with no husband present, 4.5% had a male householder with no wife present, and 28.2% were non-families. 26.9% of all households were made up of individuals, and 15.3% had someone living alone who was 65 years of age or older. The average household size was 2.76 and the average family size was 3.40.

The median age in the city was 34.5 years. 33.1% of residents were under the age of 18; 6.8% were between the ages of 18 and 24; 24.9% were from 25 to 44; 22.5% were from 45 to 64; and 12.7% were 65 years of age or older. The gender makeup of the city was 49.7% male and 50.3% female.

== Education ==
The community is served by Renwick USD 267 public school district.

The Garden Plain Owls have won the following Kansas State High School championships:

- 1973 Boys Basketball - Class 1A
- 1978 Girls Basketball - Class 2A
- 1980 Boys Basketball - Class 2A
- 1980 Boys Track - Class 2A
- 1989 Boys Basketball - Class 2A
- 1995 Girls Basketball - Class 2A
- 1996 Volleyball - Class 2A
- 1996 Girls Track - Class 2A
- 1998 Girls Track - Class 2A
- 1999 Boys Basketball - Class 2A
- 2001 Girls Basketball - Class 2A
- 2003 Girls Track - Class 2A
- 2004 Girls Track - Class 3A
- 2006 Girls Track - Class 2A
- 2007 Football - Class 3A
- 2008 Softball - Class 4A
- 2008 Volleyball - Class 3A
- 2009 Boys Track - Class 3A
- 2010 Boys Track - Class 3A
- 2010 Softball - Class 5A
- 2011 Softball - Class 4A
- 2012 Softball - Class 4A
- 2013 Girls Track - Class 3A
- 2015 Volleyball - Class 3A
- 2018 Girls Basketball - Class 3A
- 2018 Volleyball - Class 2A
- 2019 Girls Basketball - Class 2A
- 2019 Girls Track - Class 2A
- 2021 Boys Track - Class 2A
- 2021 Girls Track - Class 2A
- 2022 Girls Track - Class 2A

== Transportation ==
U.S. Routes 54 / 400 is located a few blocks north of the city running east–west. Many streets in the area are of dirt gravel.

The K&O Railroad line connects to the city from the west. The line east of the city is abandoned.

The Atchison, Topeka and Santa Fe Railway formerly provided passenger rail service to Garden Plain on a line between Wichita and Pratt. Dedicated passenger service was provided until at least 1926, while mixed trains continued until at least 1961. As of 2025, the nearest passenger rail station is located in Hutchinson, where Amtrak's Southwest Chief stops once daily on a route from Chicago to Los Angeles.

== Notable people ==
Notable individuals who were born in and/or have lived in Garden Plain include:

- James Bausch (1906–1974), decathlon gold medalist at 1932 Summer Olympics
- Dan Kerschen (born 1952), Kansas state legislator

== See also ==
- Lake Afton
