= Garden Plain Township, Whiteside County, Illinois =

Garden Plain Township
- Township
- Location in Whiteside County
- Coordinates: 41°47′54″N 90°8′40″W
- Country: United States
- State: Illinois
- County: Whiteside

Area
  - Total: 31.6 sq mi (82 km^{2})
  - Land: 30.7 sq mi (80 km^{2})
  - Water: 0.9 sq mi (2.3 km^{2}) 2.85%
- Elevation: 689 ft (210 m)

Population (2010)
  - Estimate (2016): 1,044
  - Density: 34.9/sq mi (13.5/km^{2})
- Time zone: UTC-6 (CST)
  - Summer (DST): UTC-5 (CDT)
- FIPS code: 17-195-28586

Garden Plain Township is located in Whiteside County, Illinois. As of the 2021 census, its population was 983 and it contained 492 housing units.

== Geography ==
According to the 2021 census, the township has a total area of 31 square miles (80 km^{2}), of which 30.7 square miles (80 km^{2}) (or 97.15%) is land and 0.9 square miles (2.3 km^{2}) (or 2.85%) is water.

== Demographics ==
Historical population
Census	Pop.	Note	%±
2016 (est.)	1,044
U.S. Decennial Census
