= Lakin Township, Harvey County, Kansas =

Township in Kansas, United States

Lakin Township Harvey County, Kansas
- Township
- Location within Harvey County

- Location within state of Kansas
- Coordinates: 37°57′20″N 97°32′41″W
- Country: United States
- State: Kansas
- County: Harvey

Area
  - Total: 35.50 sq mi (91.95 km^{2})
  - Land: 35.48 sq mi (91.89 km^{2})
  - Water: 0.019 sq mi (0.05 km^{2}) 0.05%
- Elevation: 1,404 ft (428 m)

Population (2020)
  - Total: 358
  - Density: 10.1/sq mi (3.90/km^{2})
- Time zone: UTC-6 (CST)
  - Summer (DST): UTC-5 (CDT)
- FIPS code: 20-38150
- GNIS ID: 473678
- Website: County website

Lakin Township is a township in Harvey County, Kansas, United States. As of the 2020 census, its population was 358.

== Geography ==
Lakin Township covers an area of 35.5 square miles (92 km^{2}) and contains no incorporated settlements. The stream of North Branch Kisiwa Creek runs through this township.
