= Andale, Kansas =

City in Sedgwick County, Kansas

- City
- Location within Sedgwick County and Kansas

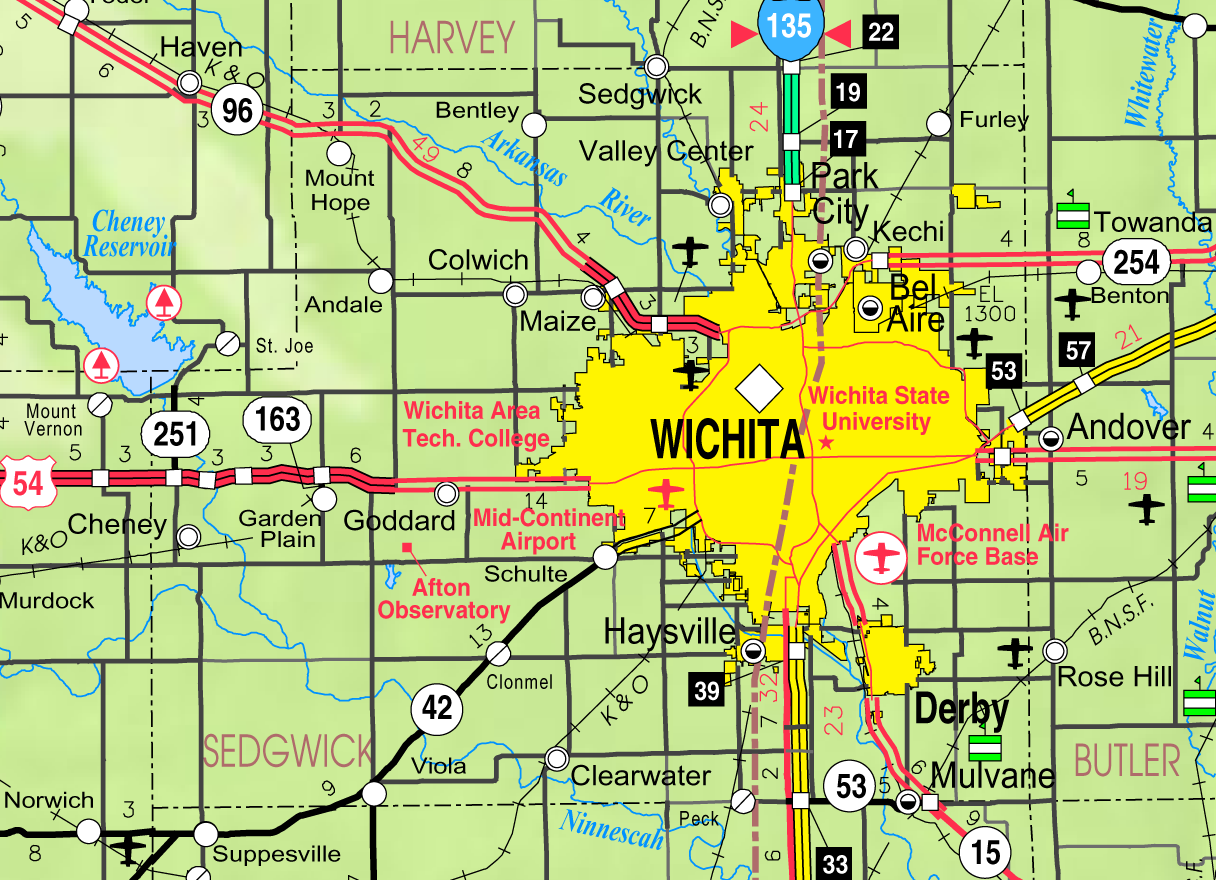
- KDOT map of Sedgwick County (legend)
- Coordinates: 37°47′28″N 97°37′45″W
- Country: United States
- State: Kansas
- County: Sedgwick
- Founded: 1880s
- Incorporated: 1901

Area
  - Total: 0.58 sq mi (1.49 km^{2})
  - Land: 0.58 sq mi (1.49 km^{2})
  - Water: 0 sq mi (0.00 km^{2})
- Elevation: 1,431 ft (436 m)

Population (2020)
  - Total: 941
  - Density: 1,640/sq mi (632/km^{2})
- Time zone: UTC-6 (CST)
  - Summer (DST): UTC-5 (CDT)
- ZIP Code: 67001
- Area code: 316
- FIPS code: 20-01775
- GNIS ID: 473809
- Website: cityofandale.com

Andale is a city in Sedgwick County, Kansas, United States. As of the 2020 census, the population of the city was 941.

== History ==
Andale was founded in the early 1880s. The city's name is a portmanteau of the surnames of two families of pioneer settlers, the Andersons and Dales.

The first post office in Andale was established in January 1899.

Andale was a station and shipping point on the Missouri Pacific Railroad.

== Geography ==
According to the United States Census Bureau, the city has a total area of 0.57 square miles (1.48 km^{2}), all land.

== Demographics ==
Historical population
Census	Pop.	Note	%±
1910	237		—
1920	259		9.3%
1930	255		−1.5%
1940	289		13.3%
1950	316		9.3%
1960	432		36.7%
1970	500		15.7%
1980	538		7.6%
1990	566		5.2%
2000	766		35.3%
2010	928		21.1%
2020	941		1.4%
U.S. Decennial Census

Andale is part of the Wichita, KS Metropolitan Statistical Area.

=== 2020 census ===
The 2020 United States census counted 941 people, 307 households, and 244 families in Andale. The population density was 1,639.4 per square mile (633.0/km^{2}). There were 325 housing units at an average density of 566.2 per square mile (218.6/km^{2}). The racial makeup was 95.96% (903) white or European American (94.05% non-Hispanic white), 0.32% (3) black or African-American, 0.0% (0) Native American or Alaska Native, 0.0% (0) Asian, 0.0% (0) Pacific Islander or Native Hawaiian, 0.43% (4) from other races, and 3.29% (31) from two or more races. Hispanic or Latino of any race was 3.4% (32) of the population.

Of the 307 households, 45.3% had children under the age of 18; 65.5% were married couples living together; 19.2% had a female householder with no spouse or partner present. 17.9% of households consisted of individuals and 8.1% had someone living alone who was 65 years of age or older. The average household size was 3.3 and the average family size was 3.9. The percent of those with a bachelor's degree or higher was estimated to be 23.4% of the population.

33.2% of the population was under the age of 18, 8.5% from 18 to 24, 24.4% from 25 to 44, 22.7% from 45 to 64, and 11.2% who were 65 years of age or older. The median age was 31.1 years. For every 100 females, there were 100.2 males. For every 100 females ages 18 and older, there were 104.2 males.

The 2016–2020 5-year American Community Survey estimates show that the median household income was $79,000 (with a margin of error of +/- $10,603) and the median family income was $85,000 (+/- $6,837). Males had a median income of $51,375 (+/- $3,807) versus $30,943 (+/- $1,998) for females. The median income for those above 16 years old was $40,391 (+/- $10,764). Approximately, 5.2% of families and 6.6% of the population were below the poverty line, including 9.5% of those under the age of 18 and 3.0% of those ages 65 or over.

=== 2010 census ===
As of the census of 2010, there were 928 people, 290 households, and 236 families living in the city. The population density was 1,628.1 inhabitants per square mile (628.6/km^{2}). There were 301 housing units at an average density of 528.1 per square mile (203.9/km^{2}). The racial makeup of the city was 98.7% White, 0.2% from other races, and 1.1% from two or more races. Hispanic or Latino of any race were 2.3% of the population.

There were 290 households, of which 52.4% had children under the age of 18 living with them, 63.1% were married couples living together, 12.4% had a female householder with no husband present, 5.9% had a male householder with no wife present, and 18.6% were non-families. 17.2% of all households were made up of individuals, and 7.6% had someone living alone who was 65 years of age or older. The average household size was 3.20 and the average family size was 3.67.

The median age in the city was 27.2 years. 38.7% of residents were under the age of 18; 8.8% were between the ages of 18 and 24; 25.6% were from 25 to 44; 18.9% were from 45 to 64; and 8.1% were 65 years of age or older. The gender makeup of the city was 48.7% male and 51.3% female.

== Education ==
The community is served by Renwick USD 267 public school district. Andale has one high school and one elementary school. Andale High School is the home of the Andale Indians. The school colors are black and gold.

== Transportation ==
Andale had passenger rail service until at least fall 1964 on the Missouri Pacific Railroad, sitting on the line from Wichita to Geneseo. As of 2025, the closest passenger rail service is at the Hutchinson station, served by Amtrak's Southwest Chief.

== Notable people ==
- B. J. Finney, football player
- Colton Haynes, model and actor.
