= MS Mitch Mitchell Floodway =

Canal in Wichita, Kansas, United States

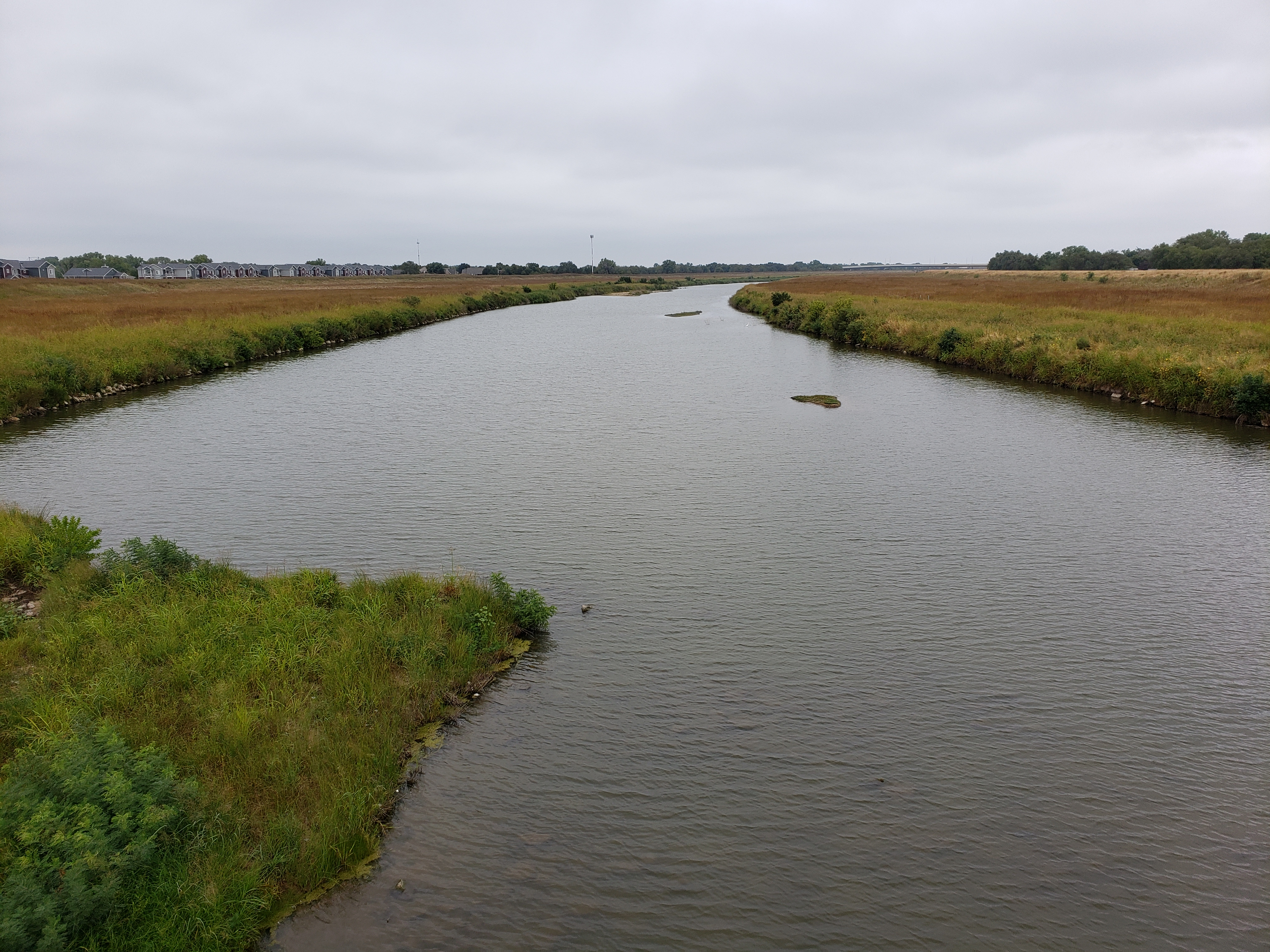
- Upstream view of the Floodway from Central Avenue in west Wichita
- Location: Wichita, Kansas
- Country: United States

Specifications
- Length: 18 miles (29 km)
- Maximum height AMSL: 1,313 ft (400 m)
- Minimum height AMSL: 1,234 ft (376 m)

History
- Current owner: City of Wichita, Kansas
- Principal engineer: M. S. “Mitch” Mitchell
- Date approved: June 22, 1936
- Construction began: May 1950
- Date completed: March 1959

Geography
- Start point: Little Arkansas River in north Wichita, Kansas
- End point: Arkansas River near Derby, Kansas
- Beginning coordinates: 37°44′57″N 97°21′40″W
- Ending coordinates: 37°33′06″N 97°17′09″W

The MS Mitch Mitchell Floodway, formerly the Wichita-Valley Center Floodway and known locally as “The Big Ditch”, is a canal in Wichita, Kansas, United States. Built in the 1950s after a series of floods in the preceding decades, the Floodway diverts water from Chisholm Creek, the Little Arkansas River, and the Arkansas River to the west, around central Wichita, before emptying back into the Arkansas downstream of the city.

== History ==
Situated at the confluence of the Arkansas and Little Arkansas Rivers, the city of Wichita was built on a swampy floodplain and thus prone to flooding in its early history. Particularly devastating floods struck in 1877, 1904, 1916, and 1923. Following the 1904 flood, the city began undertaking flood control measures, replacing portions of Chisholm Creek with canals and, in 1926, constructing levees along the Little Arkansas. One proposal would divert overflow from the Arkansas River into the Big Slough, a depression west of the city.

The U.S. Army Corps of Engineers surveyed the area and evaluated additional flood control options, including the Big Slough diversion plan. The Corps concluded no options were economically feasible and, in 1935, recommended against federal support. But, the Corps reversed its position after passage of the Flood Control Act of 1936. The Act authorized the Wichita and Valley Center Local Protection Project consisting of floodways, levees, and control structures along both rivers and Chisholm Creek. Local support had waned, however, and the Corps once again withdrew federal support.

The city flooded again in 1944, rendering more than 5,000 residents temporarily homeless. The Wichita Chamber of Commerce formed a committee to promote implementation of the Big Slough diversion plan but encountered opposition from the Sedgwick County Commission and local farmers and landowners. Opponents derisively nicknamed the proposed floodway “The Big Ditch”. The Commission finally gave its approval in 1947, and the Kansas Supreme Court eventually ruled in favor of the plan. Construction of the Project, including the Floodway, began in May 1950. Initially projected to take 2–3 years to complete, multiple factors caused delays including further legal opposition and a work stoppage due to the Korean War. Construction finished in 1959 for a total cost of $20 million. Upon completion, the Project provided protection from flooding to more than 49,000 acres (20,000 ha) of urban and rural land in the Wichita area.

A key figure in the development of the Floodway was local engineer M.S. Mitchell. Nicknamed “Big Ditch Mitch” due to his affiliation with the Project, he later served as the city flood control superintendent from 1964 to 1979. Mitchell died in 2017, and the Wichita and Sedgwick County governments issued a joint request to rename the Floodway in his honor. As of December 2018, a bill doing so had passed both houses of the U.S. Congress. In July 2019, the name was officially changed to the MS Mitch Mitchell Floodway.

== Geography ==
The Floodway begins at the Chisholm Creek Diversion in north-central Wichita where the West and Middle Forks of the Chisholm drain into the Little Arkansas River. The Floodway then flows southwest, connecting the Little Arkansas to the Arkansas River. From there, it runs southwest then south through the western part of the city, parallel to Interstate 235. Along the way, it is joined from the west by Big Slough Creek and Cowskin Creek, two minor tributaries of the Arkansas. Southwest of Wichita, the Floodway turns southeast, then east through Haysville, and then southeast again, finally draining back into the Arkansas immediately west of Derby.

== Infrastructure ==
The Floodway is the central component of the Wichita-Valley Center Flood Control Project which is among the largest water diversion projects in the United States. In addition to the Floodway, the Project includes 50 miles (80 km) of connecting channels, 100 miles (160 km) of levees, and 150 control structures throughout the Wichita metropolitan area. Levees run along both banks of the Floodway for its entire length as well as along portions of the Arkansas, Little Arkansas, the West and Middle Forks of Chisholm Creek, and several connecting channels. The largest such channel is the Little Arkansas Floodway. Located west of Valley Center, it connects the Little Arkansas River to the Arkansas River upstream from Wichita.

== Management ==
The City of Wichita’s Public Works & Utilities Department, in consultation with the Tulsa District of the U.S. Army Corps of Engineers, operates and manages the Wichita-Valley Center Flood Control Project, including the Floodway. Activities include routine maintenance, inspection of flap and sluice gates, vegetation management, floodway and levee grading as required, and erosion repairs.
