= Colwich, Kansas =

City in Sedgwick County, Kansas

- City
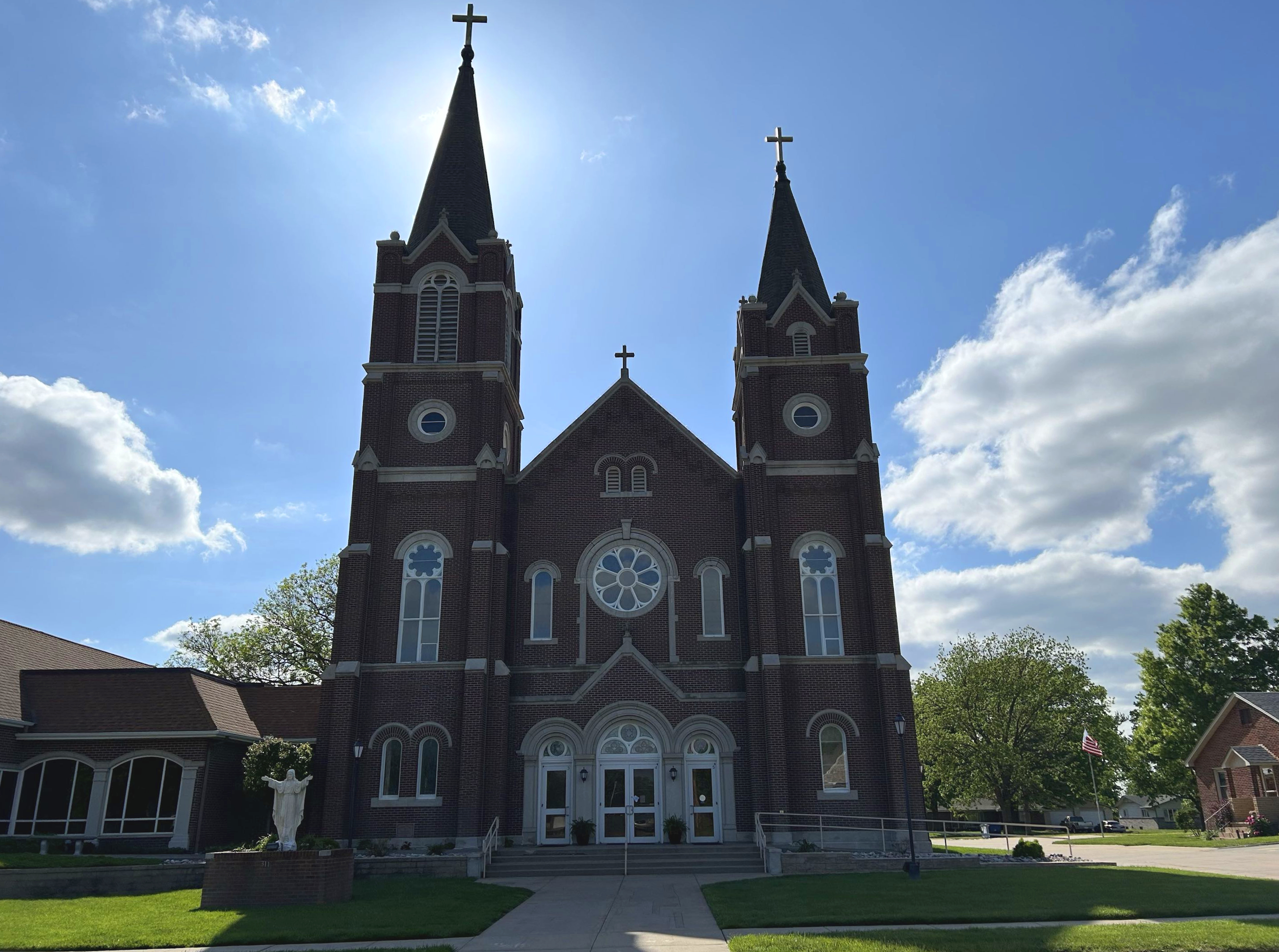
- Sacred Heart Catholic Church in Colwich (2026)

- Location within Sedgwick County and Kansas

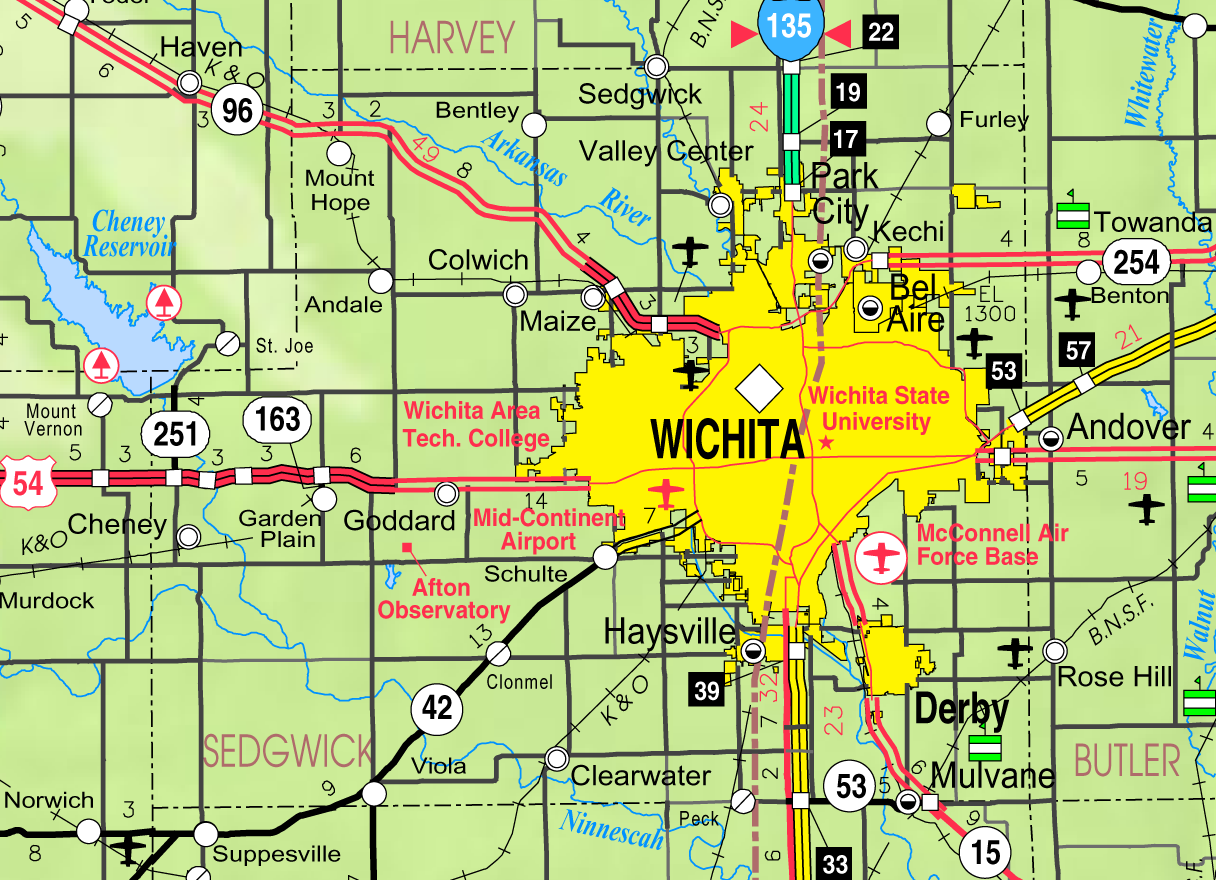
- KDOT map of Sedgwick County (legend)
- Coordinates: 37°46′50″N 97°32′26″W
- Country: United States
- State: Kansas
- County: Sedgwick
- Founded: 1887
- Incorporated: 1887

Area
  - Total: 1.34 sq mi (3.46 km^{2})
  - Land: 1.34 sq mi (3.46 km^{2})
  - Water: 0 sq mi (0.00 km^{2})
- Elevation: 1,381 ft (421 m)

Population (2020)
  - Total: 1,455
  - Density: 1,090/sq mi (421/km^{2})
- Time zone: UTC-6 (CST)
  - Summer (DST): UTC-5 (CDT)
- ZIP Code: 67030
- Area code: 316
- FIPS code: 20-15100
- GNIS ID: 473814
- Website: colwichks.org

Colwich is a city in Sedgwick County, Kansas, United States, located northwest of Wichita. As of the 2020 census, the population of the city was 1,455.

== History ==
Colwich was founded in 1887. The name is a portmanteau of Colorado and Wichita, or the Colorado & Wichita Railroad.

== Geography ==
Colwich is northwest of Wichita and centered around the intersection of 53rd St North and 167th St West. According to the United States Census Bureau, the city has a total area of 1.33 square miles (3.44 km^{2}), all land.

== Demographics ==
Colwich is part of the Wichita, KS Metropolitan Statistical Area.

Historical population
Census	Pop.	Note	%±
1890	212		—
1900	225		6.1%
1910	258		14.7%
1920	262		1.6%
1930	260		−0.8%
1940	284		9.2%
1950	339		19.4%
1960	703		107.4%
1970	879		25.0%
1980	935		6.4%
1990	1,091		16.7%
2000	1,229		12.6%
2010	1,327		8.0%
2020	1,455		9.6%
U.S. Decennial Census

=== 2020 census ===
The 2020 United States census counted 1,455 people, 535 households, and 404 families in Colwich. The population density was 1,089.9 per square mile (420.8/km^{2}). There were 561 housing units at an average density of 420.2 per square mile (162.2/km^{2}). The racial makeup was 93.75% (1,364) white or European American (92.16% non-Hispanic white), 0.07% (1) black or African-American, 0.89% (13) Native American or Alaska Native, 0.07% (1) Asian, 0.0% (0) Pacific Islander or Native Hawaiian, 0.55% (8) from other races, and 4.67% (68) from two or more races. Hispanic or Latino of any race was 3.37% (49) of the population.

Of the 535 households, 40.2% had children under the age of 18; 59.1% were married couples living together; 19.3% had a female householder with no spouse or partner present. 22.1% of households consisted of individuals and 8.0% had someone living alone who was 65 years of age or older. The average household size was 2.8 and the average family size was 3.2. The percent of those with a bachelor's degree or higher was estimated to be 20.6% of the population.

27.2% of the population was under the age of 18, 8.7% from 18 to 24, 27.4% from 25 to 44, 22.8% from 45 to 64, and 13.8% who were 65 years of age or older. The median age was 33.9 years. For every 100 females, there were 99.0 males. For every 100 females ages 18 and older, there were 100.6 males.

The 2016–2020 5-year American Community Survey estimates show that the median household income was $79,250 (with a margin of error of +/- $11,321) and the median family income was $84,750 (+/- $18,572). Males had a median income of $57,708 (+/- $8,052) versus $38,542 (+/- $10,000) for females. The median income for those above 16 years old was $45,707 (+/- $6,379). Approximately, 0.0% of families and 0.3% of the population were below the poverty line, including 0.0% of those under the age of 18 and 1.8% of those ages 65 or over.

=== 2010 census ===
As of the census of 2010, there were 1,327 people, 466 households, and 348 families living in the city. The population density was 997.7 inhabitants per square mile (385.2/km^{2}). There were 480 housing units at an average density of 360.9 per square mile (139.3/km^{2}). The racial makeup of the city was 97.4% White, 0.2% African American, 0.5% Native American, 1.1% from other races, and 0.9% from two or more races. Hispanic or Latino of any race were 2.5% of the population.

There were 466 households, of which 44.6% had children under the age of 18 living with them, 59.7% were married couples living together, 9.9% had a female householder with no husband present, 5.2% had a male householder with no wife present, and 25.3% were non-families. 22.3% of all households were made up of individuals, and 10.7% had someone living alone who was 65 years of age or older. The average household size was 2.85 and the average family size was 3.38.

The median age in the city was 32.7 years. 34.3% of residents were under the age of 18; 7.7% were between the ages of 18 and 24; 25.9% were from 25 to 44; 21.1% were from 45 to 64; and 11.1% were 65 years of age or older. The gender makeup of the city was 50.1% male and 49.9% female.

== Education ==
The community is served by Renwick USD 267 public school district.

== Transportation ==
Colwich had passenger rail service until at least fall 1964 on the Missouri Pacific Railroad, sitting on the line from Wichita to Geneseo.
