= Maize, Kansas =

City in Sedgwick County, Kansas

- City
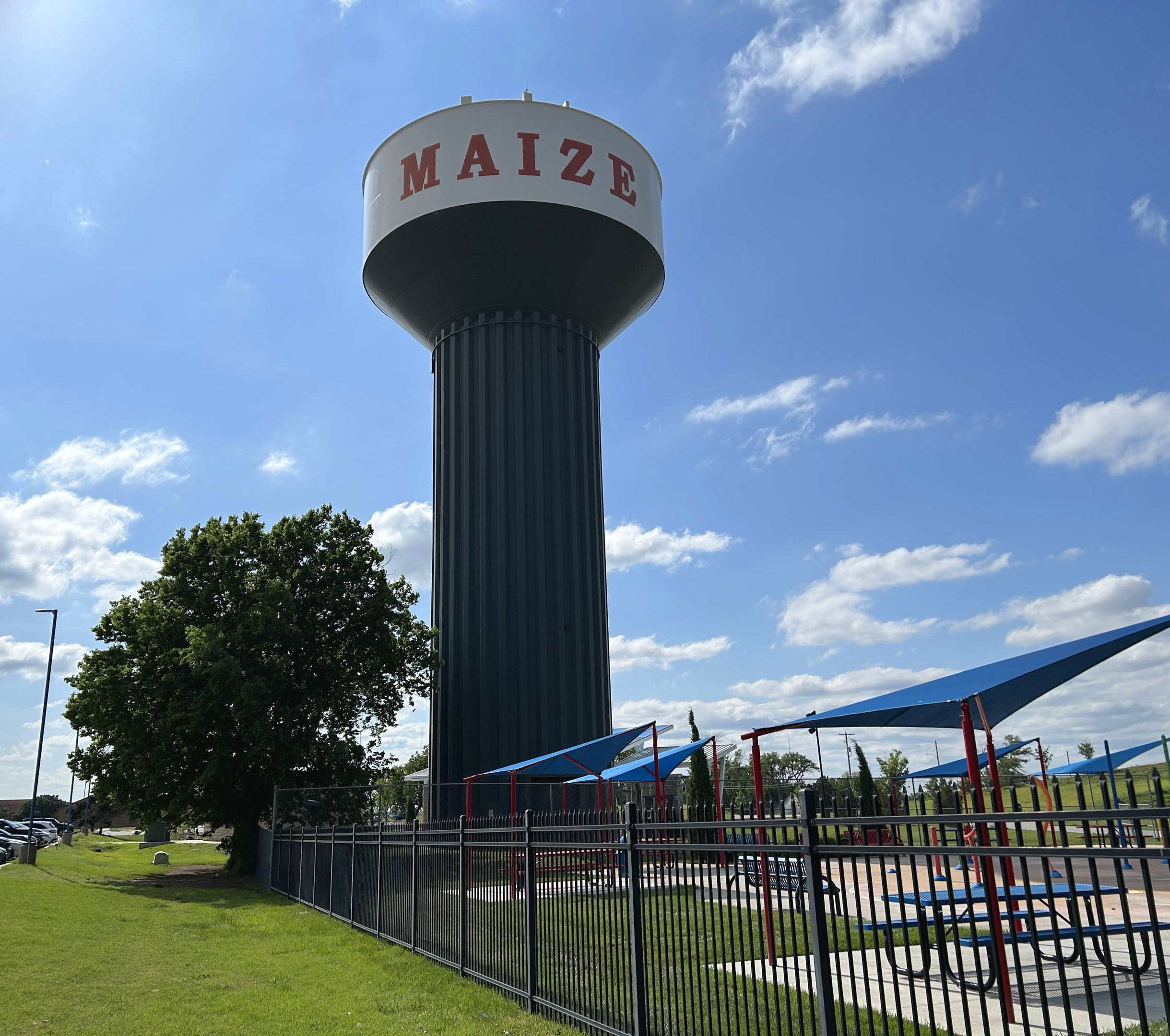
- Water tower in Maize (2026)

- Location within Sedgwick County and Kansas
- Interactive map of Maize, Kansas
- Coordinates: 37°46′45″N 97°28′2″W
- Country: United States
- State: Kansas
- County: Sedgwick
- Founded: 1886
- Incorporated: 1915
- Named for: Maize

Area
  - Total: 9.63 sq mi (24.94 km^{2})
  - Land: 9.63 sq mi (24.94 km^{2})
  - Water: 0 sq mi (0.00 km^{2})
- Elevation: 1,348 ft (411 m)

Population (2020)
  - Total: 5,735
  - Estimate (2024): 7,059
  - Density: 595.6/sq mi (230.0/km^{2})
- Time zone: UTC-6 (CST)
  - Summer (DST): UTC-5 (CDT)
- ZIP Code: 67101
- Area code: 316
- FIPS code: 20-44200
- GNIS ID: 473821
- Website: www.maizeks.gov

Maize is a city in Sedgwick County, Kansas, United States, and a northwestern suburb of Wichita. As of the 2020 census, its population was 5,735. The name Maize, derived from a Native American word for "corn", was so named because it is located within the Corn Belt.

== History ==
The Maize Town Company, led by N. F. Neiderlander, founded Maize in 1886 at the first stop outside of Wichita on the Wichita and Colorado Railway. The post office opened that same year as did the town's first church, having relocated from nearby. Maize's first school opened in 1887; its first newspaper opened in 1895. Maize State Bank, the town's first financial institution, opened in 1901, and, by 1908, a business community had emerged. In 1915, the Maize Town Company dissolved, and Maize was incorporated as a city.

Several natural disasters struck Maize in the 1930s and 1940s, including the Dust Bowl in 1934–35, a plague of grasshoppers in 1936, and a flood in 1944.

Maize began to grow rapidly in 1950, more than doubling in size by 1956. This growth has continued, accelerating in recent years as Wichita has expanded to the northwest, and transformed Maize into a suburb.

== Geography ==
Maize is located at 37°46′45″N 97°28′2″W (37.779178, −97.467267) at an elevation of 1,348 feet (411 meter). It lies on the west side of Big Slough Creek, roughly 3 miles (4.8 km) southwest of the Arkansas River in the Wellington-McPherson Lowlands region of the Great Plains. Located in south-central Kansas, Maize is on K-96, immediately northwest of Wichita.

According to the United States Census Bureau, the city has a total area of 10.058 square miles (26.05 km^{2}), of which 10.056 square miles (26.04 km^{2}) is land and 0.002 square miles (0.01 km^{2}), or 0.02% are water.

== Demographics ==
Historical population
Census	Pop.	Note	%±
1920	189		—
1930	229		21.2%
1940	198		−13.5%
1950	266		34.3%
1960	623		134.2%
1970	785		26.0%
1980	1,294		64.8%
1990	1,520		17.5%
2000	1,868		22.9%
2010	3,420		83.1%
2020	5,735		67.7%
2025 (est.)	7,853		36.9%
U.S. Decennial Census; 2020 Census

Maize is part of the Wichita metropolitan area.

According to realtor website Zillow, the average price of a home as of June 30, 2025, in Maize is $305,144.

=== 2020 census ===
As of the 2020 census, there were 5,735 people, 2,111 households, and 1,498 families in Maize. The population density was 588.9 inhabitants per square mile (227.4/km^{2}). There were 2,289 housing units at an average density of 235.1 per square mile (90.8/km^{2}).

The median age was 33.3 years. 30.6% of residents were under the age of 18, 9.0% were from 18 to 24, 27.3% were from 25 to 44, 20.5% were from 45 to 64, and 12.7% were 65 years of age or older. For every 100 females there were 95.5 males, and for every 100 females age 18 and over there were 93.2 males age 18 and over.

86.3% of residents lived in urban areas, while 13.7% lived in rural areas.

Of the 2,111 households, 40.5% had children under the age of 18 living in them. Of all households, 53.4% were married-couple households, 15.0% were households with a male householder and no spouse or partner present, and 25.2% were households with a female householder and no spouse or partner present. About 23.0% of all households were made up of individuals, and 10.3% had someone living alone who was 65 years of age or older.

There were 2,289 housing units, of which 7.8% were vacant. The homeowner vacancy rate was 2.2% and the rental vacancy rate was 8.8%.

Racial composition as of the 2020 census
Race	Number	Percent
White	4,692	81.8%
Black or African American	167	2.9%
American Indian and Alaska Native	66	1.2%
Asian	93	1.6%
Native Hawaiian and Other Pacific Islander	4	0.1%
Some other race	148	2.6%
Two or more races	565	9.9%
Hispanic or Latino (of any race)	589	10.3%

Demographic estimates

The average household size was 2.5 and the average family size was 3.1. The percent of those with a bachelor's degree or higher was estimated to be 20.5% of the population.

Income and poverty

The 2016–2020 5-year American Community Survey estimates show that the median household income was $59,856 (with a margin of error of +/- $18,462) and the median family income was $75,993 (+/- $24,517). Males had a median income of $48,077 (+/- $8,030) versus $31,755 (+/- $11,804) for females. The median income for those above 16 years old was $39,703 (+/- $15,974). Approximately, 1.8% of families and 4.8% of the population were below the poverty line, including 0.5% of those under the age of 18 and 0.0% of those ages 65 or over.

=== 2010 census ===
As of the 2010 census, there were 3,420 people, 1,172 households, and 942 families living in the city. The population density was 386.9 inhabitants per square mile (149.4/km^{2}). There were 1,284 housing units at an average density of 145.2 per square mile (56.1/km^{2}). The racial makeup of the city was 91.3% White, 1.5% African American, 1.1% Native American, 1.1% Asian, 0.1% Pacific Islander, 1.3% from other races, and 3.6% from two or more races. Hispanic or Latino of any race were 7.4% of the population.

There were 1,172 households, of which 49.4% had children under the age of 18 living with them, 59.4% were married couples living together, 15.2% had a female householder with no husband present, 5.8% had a male householder with no wife present, and 19.6% were non-families. 17.2% of all households were made up of individuals, and 7.4% had someone living alone who was 65 years of age or older. The average household size was 2.92 and the average family size was 3.28.

The median age in the city was 30.7 years. 34.1% of residents were under the age of 18; 7.6% were between the ages of 18 and 24; 27.7% were from 25 to 44; 21.8% were from 45 to 64; and 8.8% were 65 years of age or older. The gender makeup of the city was 48.6% male and 51.4% female.

== Government ==
Maize has a mayor-council-administrator form of government. The city council consists of the mayor and five members who serve part-time. The mayor is elected to a four-year term while terms for council members are staggered such that two members are up for election every two years.

== Education ==
The community is served by Maize USD 266 public school district, which operates eighteen schools in and around the city.

== Infrastructure ==
=== Transportation ===
K-96 runs northwest-southeast through the middle of the city but remains outside of the official city limits. Questions of jurisdictional responsibility relating to highways and infrastructure as well as law enforcement authority have long been an issue of misunderstanding amongst city leaders. City police have no police authority on K-96 unless operating under a deputy sheriff commission granted under the authority of the Sedgwick County Sheriff. Currently, sheriff's deputies and members of the Kansas Highway Patrol are tasked with all law enforcement and investigative responsibility.

The Hutchinson line of the Kansas and Oklahoma Railroad runs southeast–northwest through Maize.

Maize Airport is a privately owned, public-use airport located two nautical miles (2.3 mi, 3.7 km) southeast of the central business district of Maize.

== Notable people ==
Notable individuals who were born in and/or have lived in Maize include:

- Nancy Kassebaum (1932–2026), U.S. Senator from Kansas
- Richard Kassebaum (1960–2008), documentary filmmaker
- Miles Ukaoma (born 1992), Olympian
