= Downtown Wichita =

- Central business district
- Downtown Wichita viewed from Broadway and English (2025)
- Interactive map of Downtown Wichita
- Coordinates: 37°41′20″N 97°20′10″W
- Country: United States
- State: Kansas
- County: Sedgwick
- City: Wichita

Area
  - Total: 0.97 sq mi (2.5 km^{2})
  - Land: 0.95 sq mi (2.5 km^{2})
  - Water: 0.02 sq mi (0.052 km^{2})
- Elevation: 1,299 ft (396 m)

Population (2023)
  - Total: 3,352
  - Density: 2,276/sq mi (879/km^{2})
- ZIP code: 67202, 67203, 67214
- Area code: 316
- Website: https://downtownwichita.org

Downtown Wichita is the central business, government and social core of the Wichita metropolitan area, in the U.S. state of Kansas. It is generally bounded by the Arkansas River on the west, Washington Street on the east, U.S. 54 & 400 on the south, and Murdock Street on the north, encompassing the city's historic core as well as Old Town and Delano districts. The area includes major civic landmarks such as Century II Performing Arts & Convention Center, Intrust Bank Arena, Equity Bank Park, the historic City Hall, and a U.S. Federal Courthouse.

== History ==
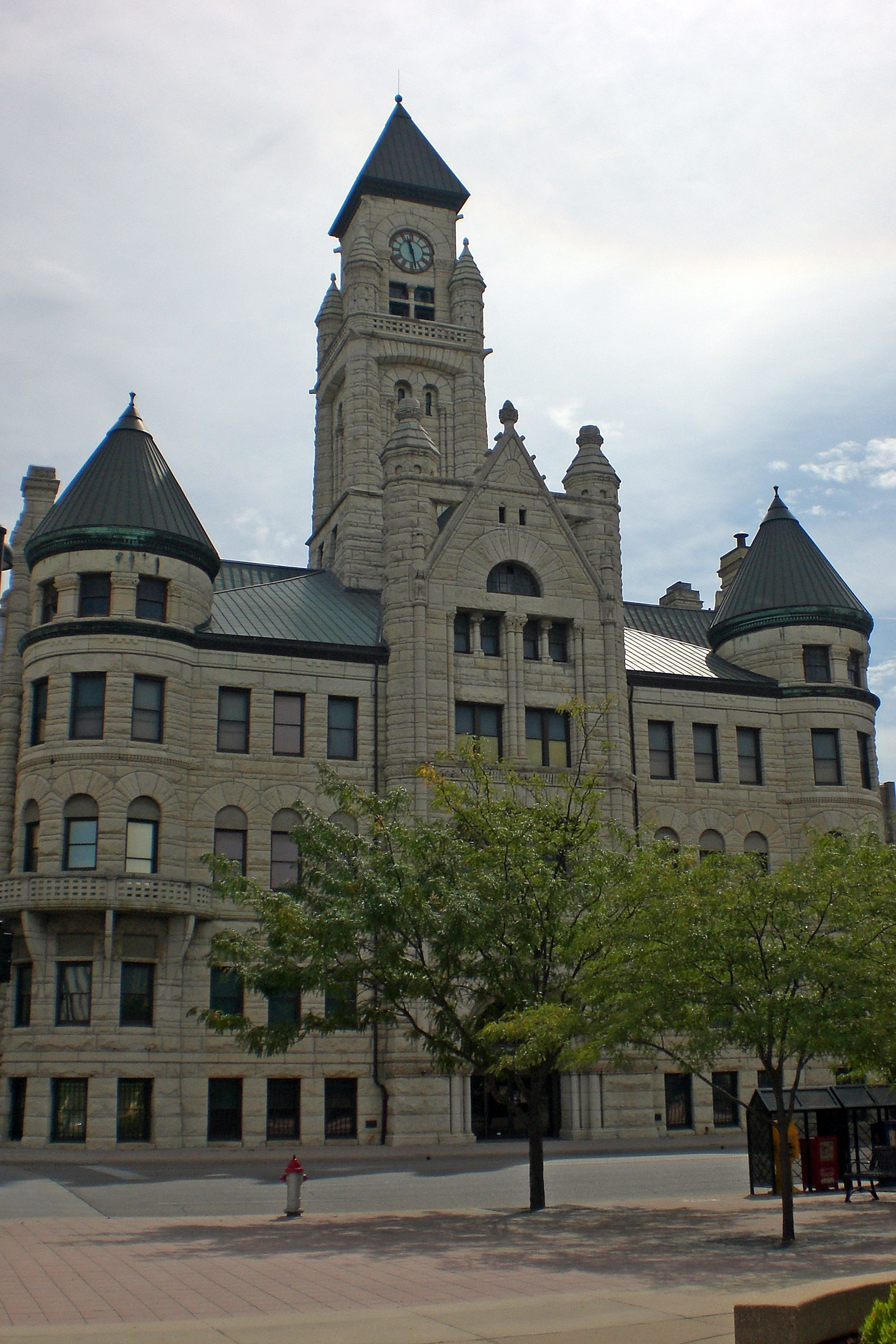
Wichita's Old City Hall, now the Sedgwick County Historical Museum (2008)

In 1872, the community of Wichita opened a toll bridge on Douglas Avenue to Delano across the Arkansas River, and the Atchison, Topeka and Santa Fe Railway opened a line through the city, triggering an economic boom. Local industries in banking, meat packing, and real estate emerged. A large warehouse district developed along the rail lines south from Central Avenue. By the late 1870s, the intersection of Douglas Avenue and Main Street had become the downtown hub of local commerce.

Continued economic growth through the 1880s spurred further downtown development, including the completion of the Wichita City Building in 1892. The building housed all city government offices, both the police and fire departments, and the city's first public library. During the subsequent decades, a number of manufacturers constructed plants downtown, including the Coleman Company in 1901.

The Forum, Wichita's convention center and primary event venue, opened downtown in 1911. It was built on the site of city co-founder Dutch Bill Greiffenstein's homestead. The Orpheum Theatre opened downtown in 1922 and became a popular venue on the vaudeville circuit.

By the 1960s, sections of downtown had entered a period of decline. To commemorate the centennial of Wichita's founding, the city razed The Forum and in its place built the Century II Performing Arts & Convention Center which opened in 1969. The city government relocated to a new City Hall in 1975. In 1981, the former City Building reopened as the Wichita-Sedgwick County Historical Museum. In 1987, construction finished downtown on the Epic Center office tower, the tallest building in the city and in the state of Kansas. In 1989, the city initiated a redevelopment plan to revitalize Downtown Wichita. Among the plan's results was the redevelopment of the old warehouse district into Old Town, an entertainment district home to numerous restaurants and night clubs. The city implemented further development plans, including the construction of Intrust Bank Arena, a new multi-purpose indoor arena which opened in 2010.

== Geography ==
Downtown Wichita is located at 37°41′20″N 97°20′10″W (37.688888, −97.336111) at an elevation of 1,299 feet (396 m). It mainly consists of the area between Murdock Street to the north, U.S. Route 54 (Kellogg) to the south, the Arkansas River to the west, and Washington Street to the east. Portions of Downtown overlap with the Midtown neighborhood to the north, Delano across the river to the west, and Riverside to the northwest. In addition, it borders the McAdams neighborhood to the northeast, The Hyde (also called Kellogg School) to the east, and South Central to the south.

== Demographics ==
In 2020, the City of Wichita estimated a downtown population of approximately 3,000 residents, an increase from fewer than 1,000 residents in the early 2000s. By the early 2020s, the number of residential units downtown had expanded significantly through conversions of office towers and warehouses, as well as new apartment construction in the Old Town and Delano districts.

Downtown Wichita contains more than 7,000,000 square feet (650,000 m^{2}) of office space, with Class A space concentrated in buildings such as the Epic Center and 125 N Market. The area is home to more than 26,000 employees, primarily in government, health care, education, and financial services.

Downtown also contains over 1,500 hotel rooms, representing a significant share of the city's lodging capacity, with properties ranging from national chains to boutique hotels located in historic buildings. Major redevelopment efforts since 2010, including the construction of Intrust Bank Arena, riverfront improvements, and the conversion of historic office buildings to apartments, represent investment valued at nearly $2 billion.

== Economy ==
As of 2018, several national and regional companies maintain offices in Downtown Wichita. The headquarters of agricultural conglomerate Cargill’s Protein Group is located there as are the central offices of IT company High Touch Technologies, shipping firm King of Freight, and area commercial banks Emprise Bank, Fidelity Bank, and Intrust Bank. Other firms with offices downtown include telecommunications conglomerate AT&T, life insurance company New York Life, engineering consultancy PEC, home security firm Protection One, and regional electric utility Westar Energy.

Once the largest bank in Kansas, Bank IV was headquartered in downtown Wichita from its foundation in 1887 to its acquisition in 1995 by Boatman's Bank. Outdoor equipment maker Coleman, founded in Wichita in 1901, operated a factory downtown from 1929 to 1990 and then a factory outlet store and museum until 2018.

Several national hotel chains have locations downtown. The Hyatt Regency Wichita and the historic Broadview Hotel, operated by Drury Hotels, are near the Century II Performing Arts & Convention Center. Other hotels include the Ambassador Hotel, Hotel at Old Town, Hotel at WaterWalk, as well as a Courtyard by Marriott in Old Town, the new AC Hotel by Marriott, Unscripted (under construction), Hotel Indigo (under construction in the Petroleum Building), and the Hilton Garden Inn with its swimming pool cantilevered over Douglas Avenue. Fairfield Inn by Marriott and Wyndham Garden also continue to operate downtown.

== Government ==
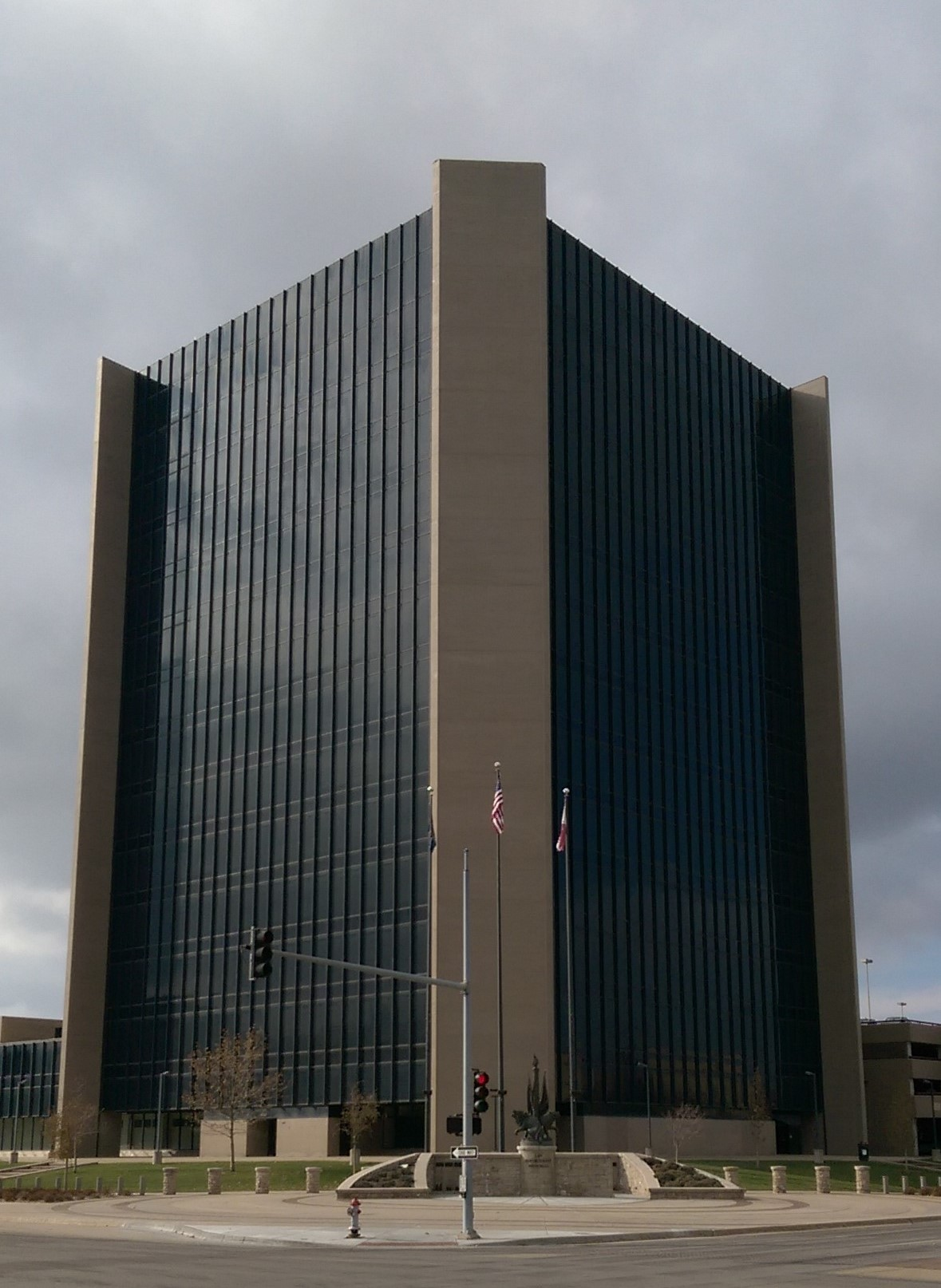
Wichita City Hall (2018)

The portion of Downtown north of Douglas Avenue and west of Washington Street is in City Council District 6. The rest of Downtown is in City Council District 1. Wichita City Hall is located downtown at the corner of Main Street and Central Avenue.

Downtown Wichita is in the 29th district of the Kansas Senate and the 103rd district of the Kansas House of Representatives.

The Wichita U.S. Courthouse, one of the three courthouses of the United States District Court for the District of Kansas, is located downtown at the corner of 3rd Street and North Market Street.

Other government facilities in the area include the Sedgwick County Courthouse, which houses county government offices and courts, and the Wichita-Sedgwick County Historical Museum, which occupies the former Wichita City Hall. Downtown is also the site of the primary United States Postal Service processing and distribution center for south-central Kansas, as well as several state and federal agency offices, including the Kansas Department for Children and Families and the U.S. Bankruptcy Court.

== Media ==
The offices of The Wichita Eagle, the primary newspaper published in the city, and the Wichita Business Journal are located downtown in Old Town. The Roman Catholic Diocese of Wichita publishes its official newspaper, Catholic Advance, from its offices in downtown Wichita.

KMUW, the NPR member station in Wichita, broadcasts from studios in Old Town.

== Parks and recreation ==
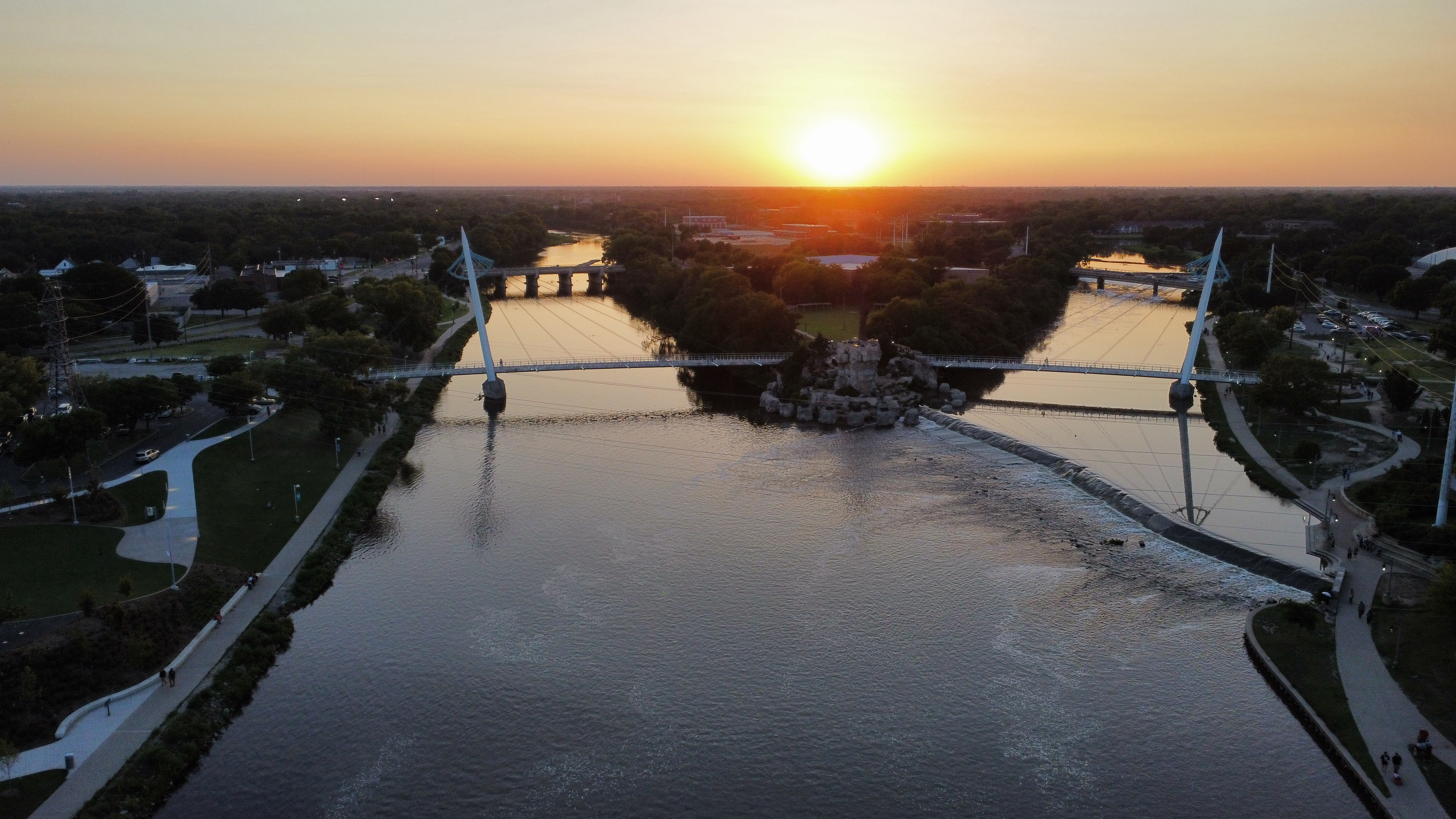
Keeper of the Plains Plaza at the confluence of the Little Arkansas (right) and Arkansas River (left) (2025)

Several small parks and memorial spaces are located in downtown Wichita, most of them managed by the city's Park and Recreation Department.

- A. Price Woodard Park – 4.2 acres on the east bank of the Arkansas River with a fountain, amphitheater, and sculptures
- Chester I. Lewis Reflection Square Park – pocket park on Douglas Avenue commemorating the 1958 Dockum Drug Store sit-in
- Finlay Ross Park – landscaped plaza with fountains next to Century II
- Heritage Square Park – 0.45-acre park on East William Street with a gazebo and fountain
- Mayor's Pine Grove – small green space established in 1978 at Water and 2nd streets
- Naftzger Memorial Park – 0.9-acre park on East Douglas Avenue renovated in 2019 with lawn, stage, and interactive fountains
- Veterans Memorial Park – 3.5-acre riverfront park with 16 memorials honoring U.S. military veterans
- Wichita Skatepark – all-concrete skateboarding park beneath the U.S. 54 overpass on South St. Francis Street
- Keeper of the Plains Plaza – pedestrian plaza at the confluence of the Arkansas and Little Arkansas rivers with nightly firepot ceremonies

== Culture ==
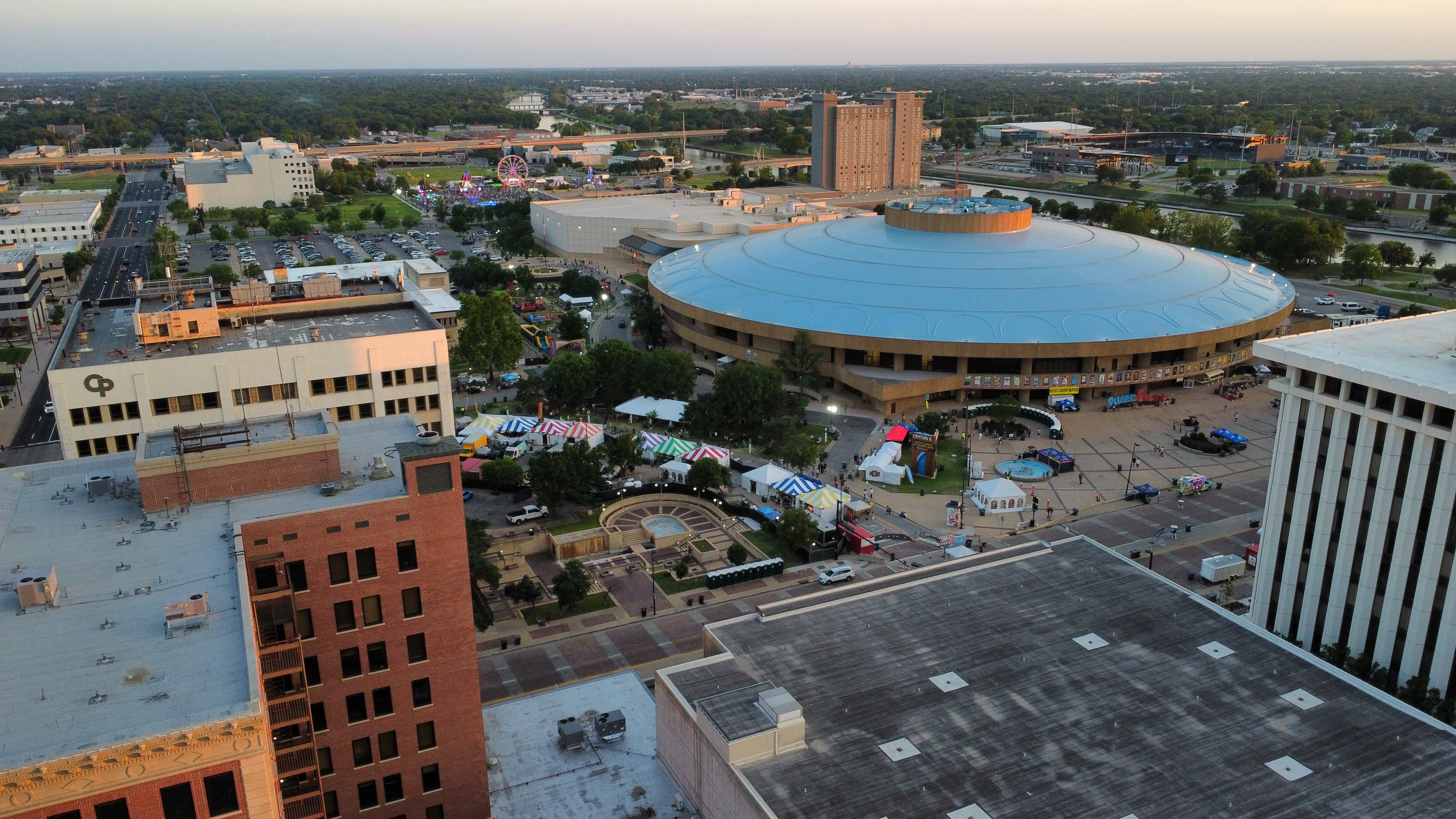
Century II during Riverfest Wichita (2025)

=== Points of interest ===
==== Historic buildings ====
- Historic Sedgwick County Courthouse – Romanesque Revival courthouse completed in 1889, now preserved as a historic site
- Federal Courthouse – downtown courthouse for the U.S. District Court for the District of Kansas
- Wichita Carnegie Library Building – 1915 Carnegie library building, later repurposed as the municipal court building
- Eaton Place – former department store building on Douglas Avenue redeveloped into apartments and retail space

==== Museums ====
- Great Plains Transportation Museum – railroad museum featuring historic locomotives and rolling stock
- Kansas Sports Hall of Fame – museum honoring athletes from Kansas
- Museum of World Treasures – museum featuring historical artifacts, fossils, and cultural exhibits
- Wichita-Sedgwick County Historical Museum – local history museum housed in the former Wichita City Hall (1892)
- Exploration Place – science and discovery center on the Arkansas River
- Old Cowtown Museum – living history museum depicting Wichita in the 19th century
- Wichita Art Museum – city's largest art museum, part of the Museums on the River District
- Botanica, The Wichita Gardens – botanical gardens with themed exhibits and seasonal displays

==== Districts ====
- Old Town District – historic warehouse district redeveloped into shops, restaurants, and residential space
- Commerce Street Art District – area of converted warehouses with art galleries and studios
- Douglas Design District – commercial district known for local shops, dining, and murals

==== Venues ====
- Century II Performing Arts & Convention Center – multipurpose performing arts and convention facility opened in 1969
- Intrust Bank Arena – 15,000-seat indoor arena opened in 2010; the largest non-university venue in Kansas
- Orpheum Theatre – 1922 vaudeville theater, one of the last original Orpheum Circuit theaters still operating, now used for concerts and films
- Scottish Rite Temple – historic Masonic building used for concerts, performances, and community events
- WAVE – indoor–outdoor venue in Old Town used for concerts, festivals, and community events

=== Bronze sculptures ===
Downtown Wichita features a collection of bronze sculptures installed in public spaces beginning in the 1990s as part of the city's outdoor art initiative. The works are located along Douglas Avenue. Subjects range from historical figures to abstract forms, with pieces commemorating local leaders, civic events, and cultural themes. The collection is intended to integrate public art into the city's core and enhance pedestrian areas.

=== Events ===
Wichita hosts a number of annual cultural and community events that draw regional and national attention.

- Riverfest Wichita – The city's largest festival, held each summer since 1972 along the Arkansas River. The event features concerts, parades, fireworks, food vendors, and family activities, attracting hundreds of thousands of attendees.
- Open Streets ICT – A ciclovía-style event launched in 2017 that closes several miles of Douglas Avenue and other streets to motor vehicle traffic, opening them for pedestrians, cyclists, fitness classes, and cultural activities. The event draws tens of thousands of participants each year and has expanded to multiple neighborhoods.
- Tallgrass Film Festival – An international independent film festival founded in 2003 and held each October at venues across downtown Wichita. The festival has been recognized by MovieMaker magazine as one of the “Top 50 Film Festivals Worth the Entry Fee” and brings filmmakers and audiences from around the world.

== Architecture ==
Downtown Wichita developed as the original commercial and civic core of the city, with many of its earliest brick and stone buildings clustered along Douglas Avenue. Early landmarks included the Sedgwick County Courthouse (1888) and Wichita's Old City Hall (1892), both constructed in the Richardsonian Romanesque style and designed by local architect Proudfoot & Bird. The Romanesque Revival style remained influential in downtown's civic architecture into the early 20th century.

The city's first modern high-rise was the Bitting Building, completed in 1912 in the Chicago School style. Other early office towers included the 14-story First National Bank Building (1921) and the Scottish Rite Center (1887, expanded 1908), a prominent example of Classical Revival design. Mid-century development added several new towers, notably the 22-story Epic Center (1987), which remains the tallest building in Kansas.

In the 21st century, downtown has experienced significant reinvestment, with adaptive reuse projects such as the Eaton Place redevelopment and new construction including the Kansas Leadership Center headquarters (2013) and the Cargill Protein headquarters (2018). Planned additions include the Biomedical Campus at Broadway and William, which is expected to become a major institutional anchor.

=== Tallest buildings ===
View of downtown Wichita skyline from the southeast. Buildings in view include the Epic Center, Garvey Center, 125 N Market, and the under-construction Biomedical Campus in the foreground.

Tallest buildings in Downtown Wichita
Name	Location	Stories	Height
Epic Center	301 North Main Street	22	385 ft (117 m)
250 Douglas	250 West Douglas Avenue	28	262 ft (80 m)
125 N Market (New York Life Insurance)	125 N Market Street	19	250 ft (76 m)
Hyatt Regency Wichita	400 West Waterman Street	17	223 ft (67 m)
Ambassador Hotel	104 S Broadway Street	14	172 ft (52 m)

=== Historic districts ===
Several parts of Downtown Wichita are listed on the National Register of Historic Places. The Wichita Historic Warehouse and Jobbers District encompasses a number of early 20th-century warehouse buildings in the eastern part of downtown. The Old Town District contains brick warehouses that have been redeveloped into shops, restaurants, and residential lofts. The Government district includes the historic Sedgwick County Courthouse and related civic buildings. The Bitting Historic District covers a cluster of late 19th- and early 20th-century commercial structures.

== Transportation ==
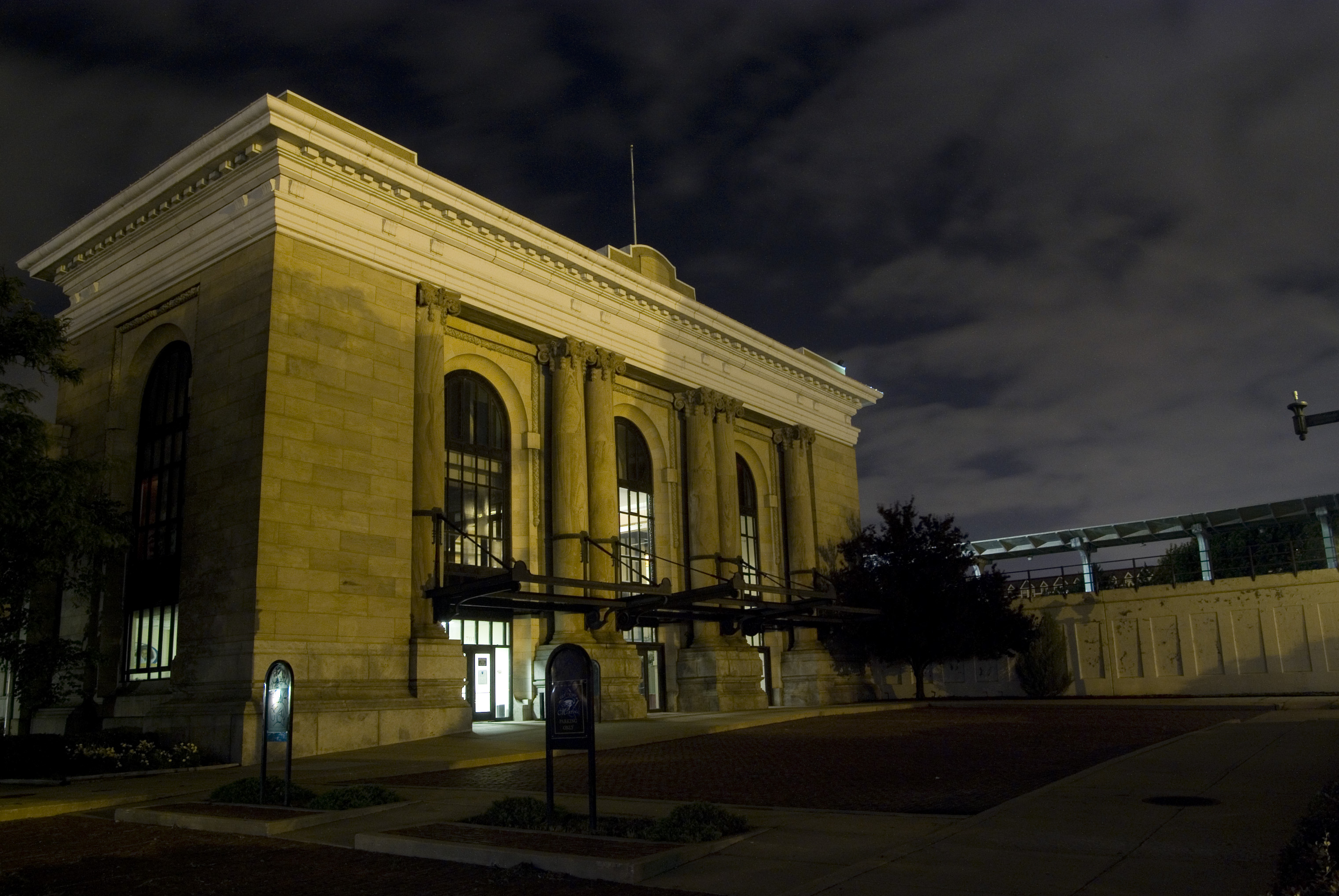
Union Station, Wichita's former passenger rail station (2009)

Broadway Street is the main north–south street through downtown; Douglas Avenue is the main east–west street. Other arterial roads include: Central Avenue, which runs east–west along the central business district's northern edge; Washington Avenue, which runs north–south along its eastern edge; and Kellogg Avenue (U.S. Route 54 and U.S. Route 400), which runs along its southern edge. The base point for the numbering of all postal addresses in the city and Sedgwick County is the intersection of Douglas Avenue and Main Street. Douglas is the divider between north and south; Main Street is the divider between east and west.

The Wichita Transit Center, Wichita Transit’s main bus terminal, is located downtown at South Topeka Street and East William Street. Most of Wichita Transit's bus routes service the central business district including the 11 through 17 and 21 through 29 routes. All four routes of the free Q-Line trolley also service downtown. In 2023, the city announced plans to relocate the Wichita Transit Center from its longtime site at South Topeka and East William streets to a new facility in Delano. The move is intended to modernize the system's main hub, improve passenger amenities, and better connect bus routes with adjacent redevelopment projects in the downtown core.

BNSF Railway and Union Pacific Railroad operate freight rail lines which run north–south through downtown Wichita, parallel to Santa Fe Avenue. There has been no passenger rail service to Wichita since 1979. Union Station, the former passenger rail station in the city, has since been repurposed as an office building.

== Gallery ==
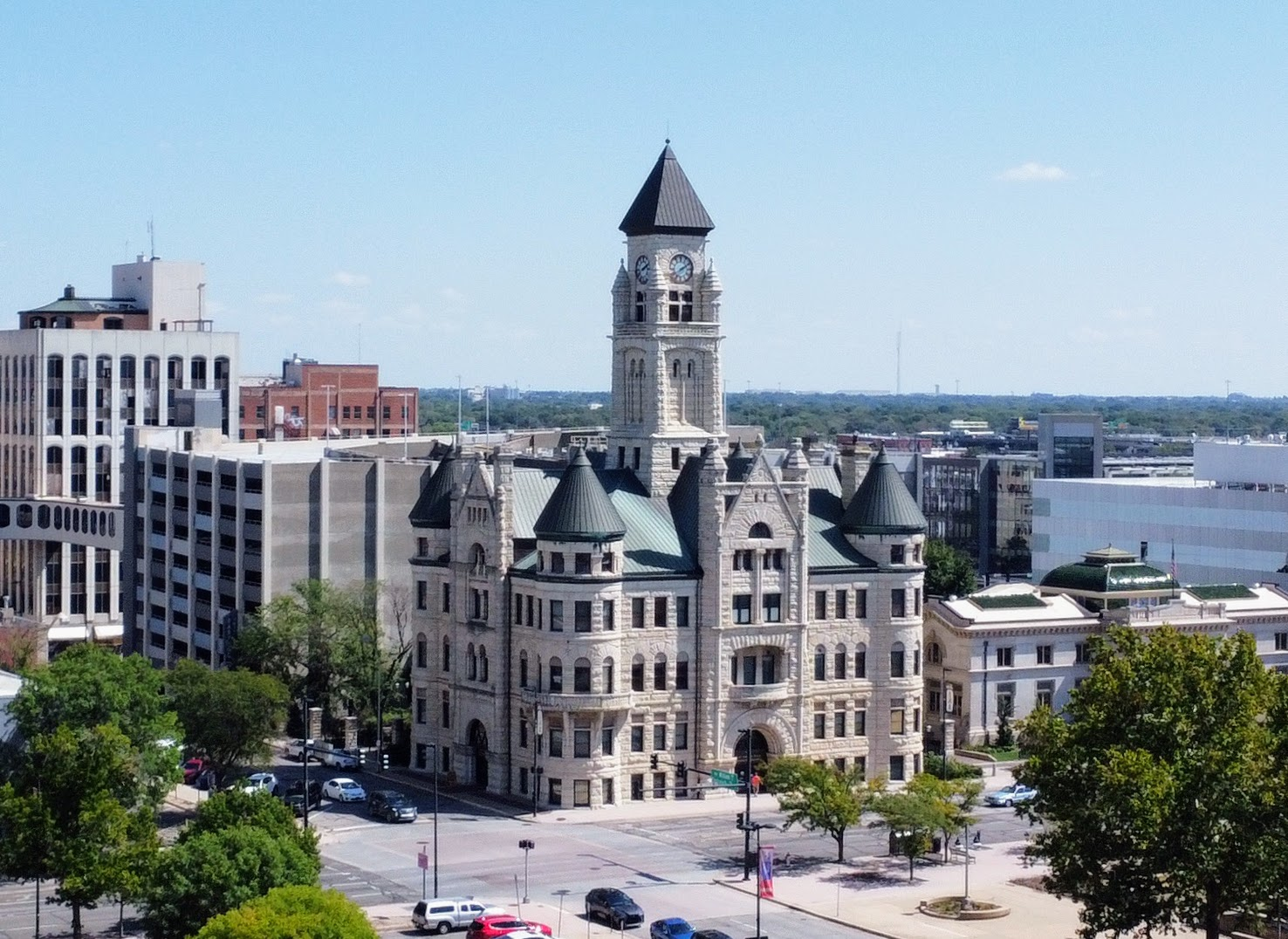
Historic Sedgwick County Courthouse (2023)

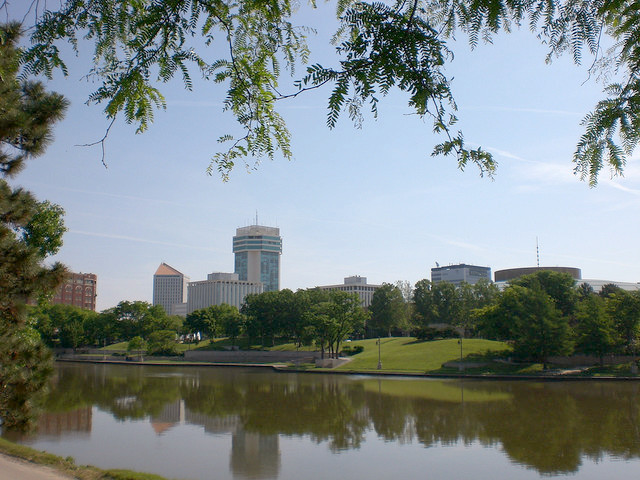
Downtown viewed from west bank of Arkansas River, looking northeast

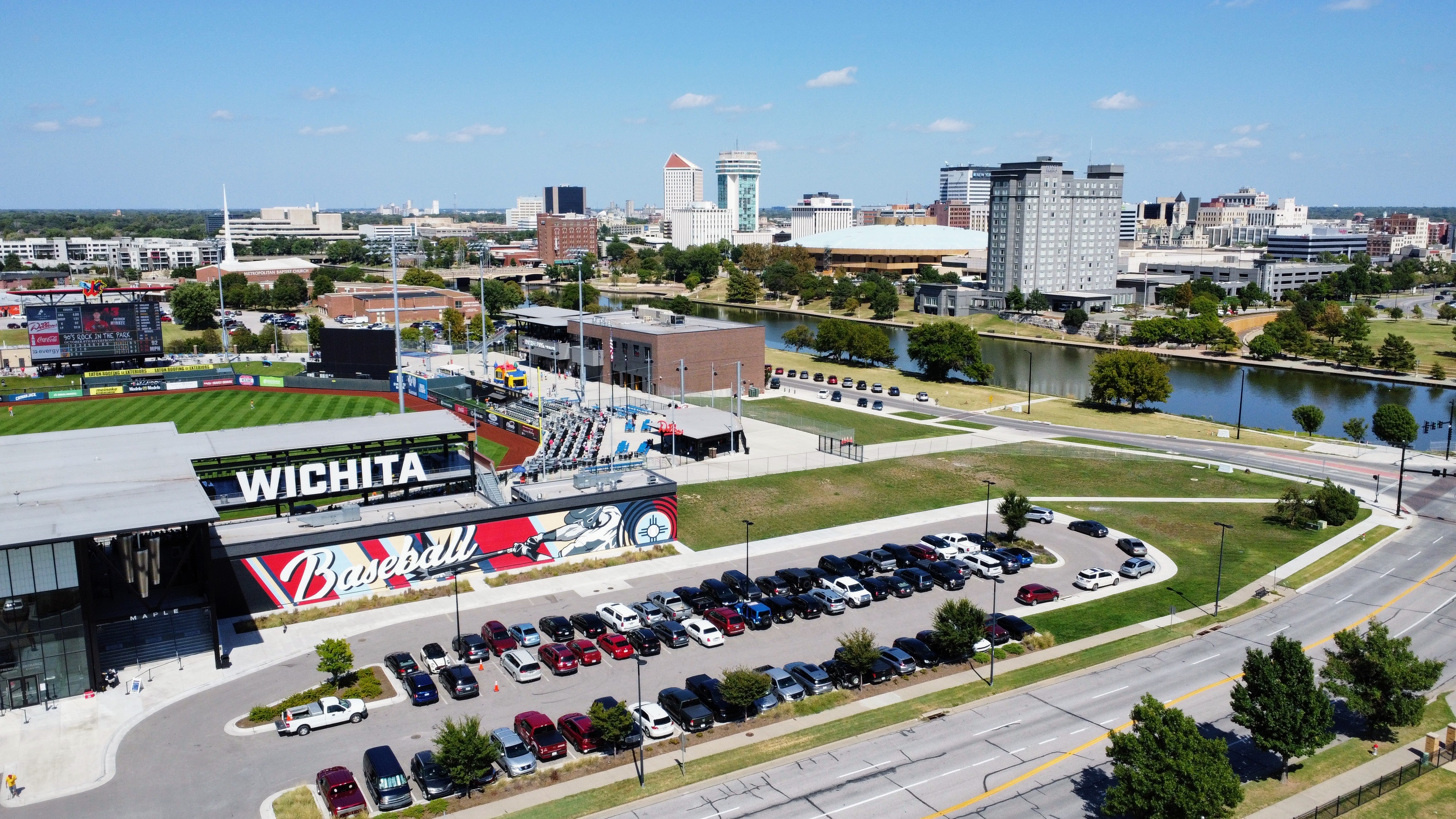
Aerial of skyline from Equity Bank Park (2023)

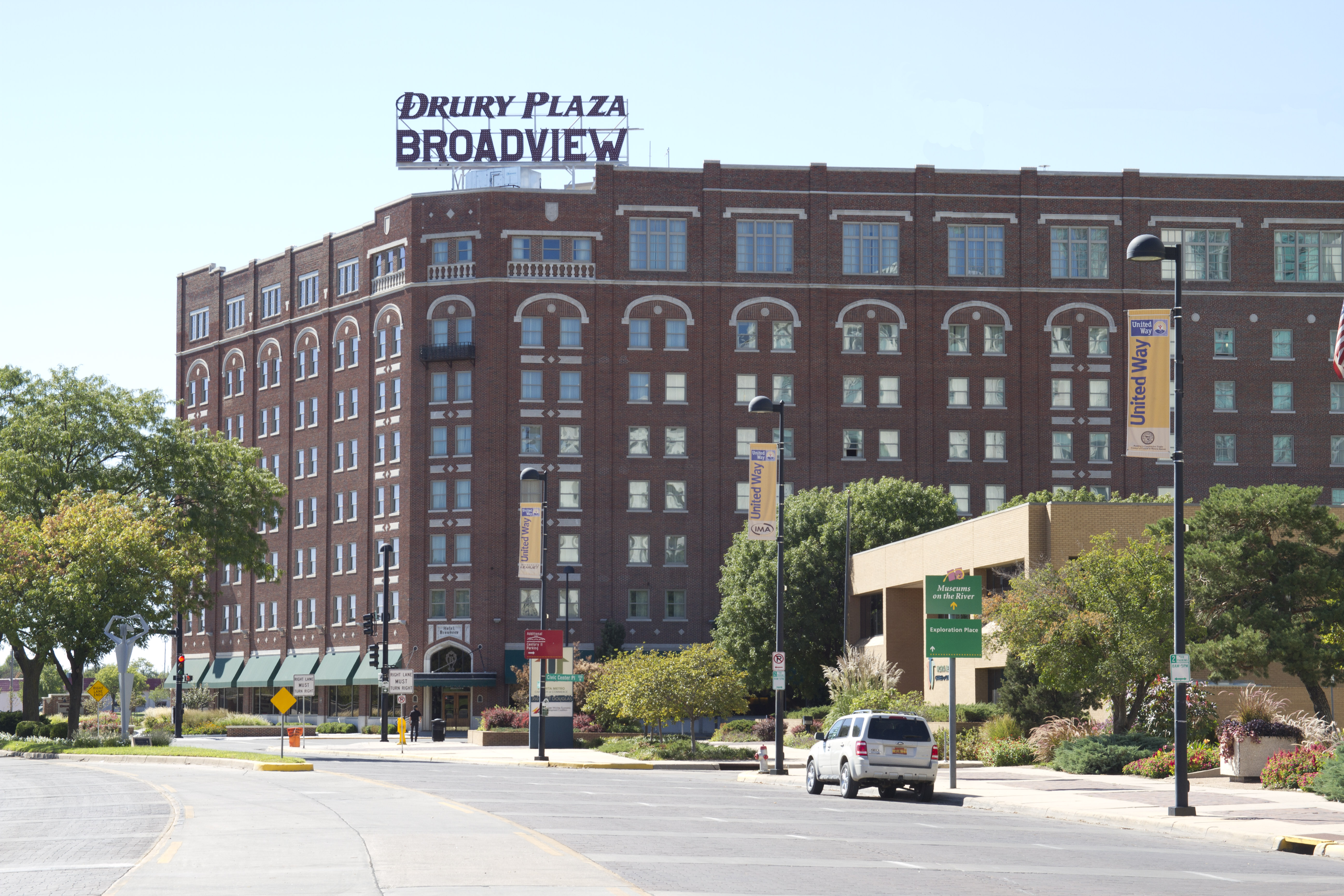
Broadview Hotel (2012)

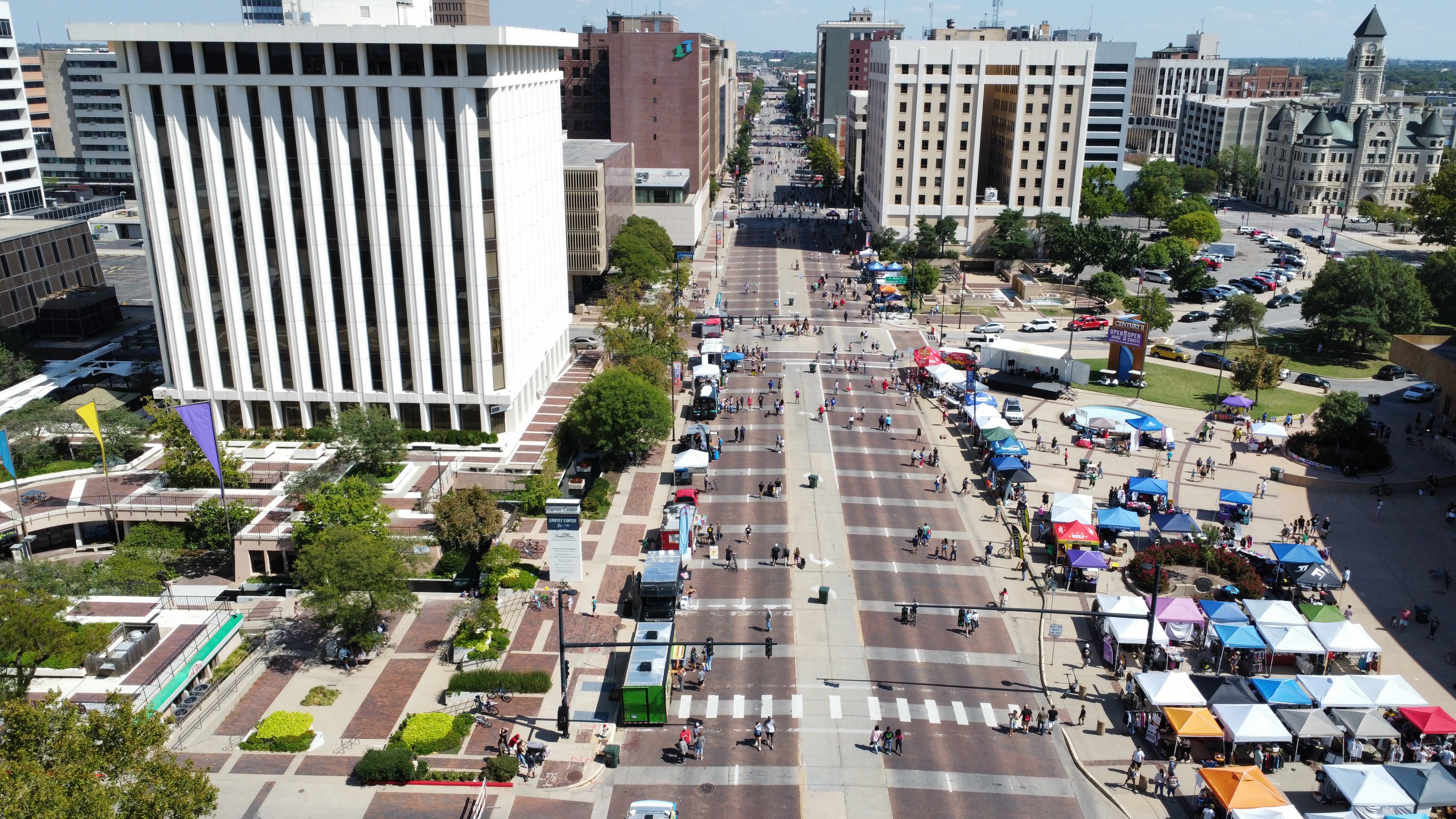
Aerial of main drag, Douglas Avenue, during an Open Streets event, looking east (2023)

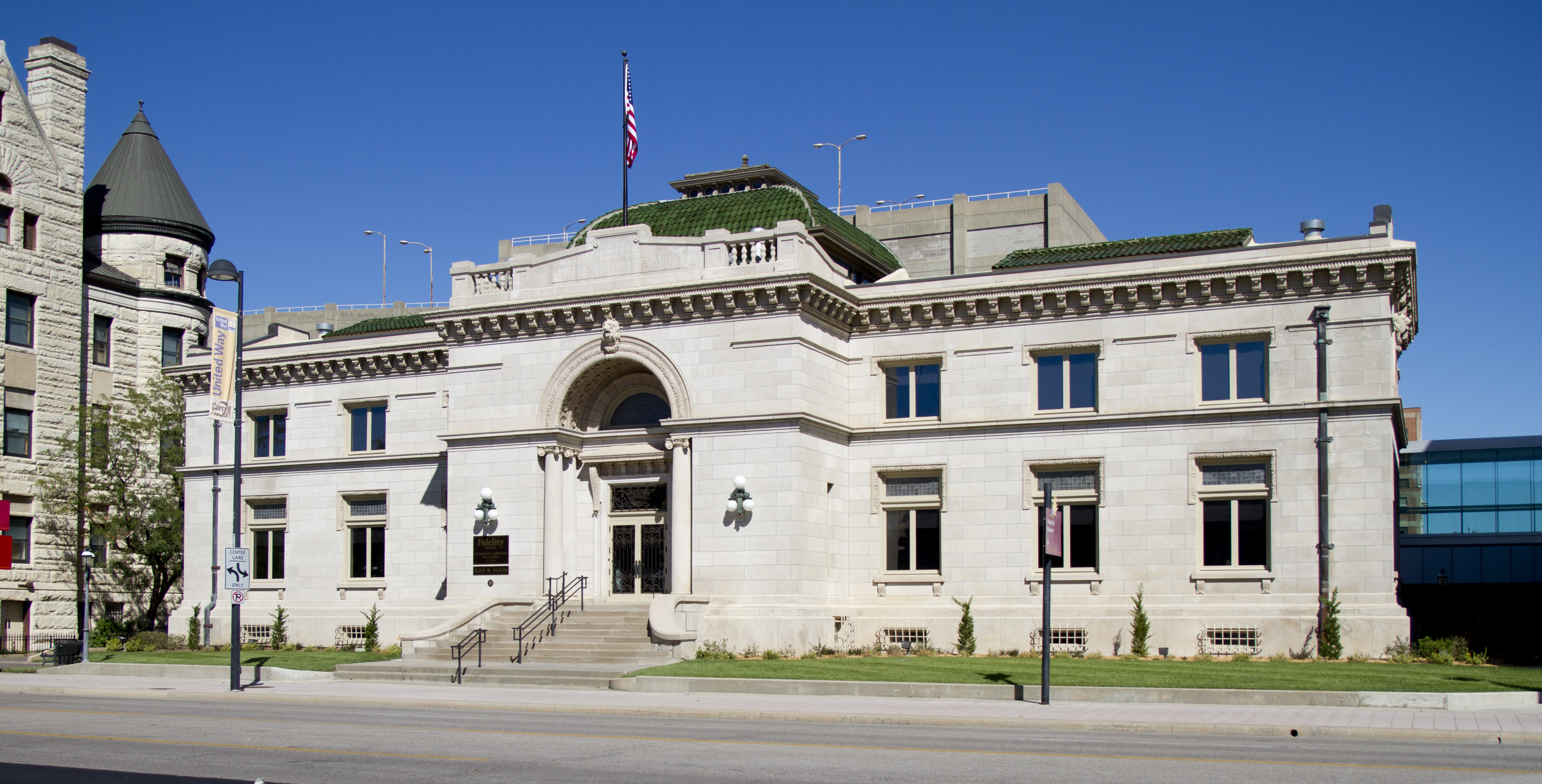
Carnegie Library Building (2012)

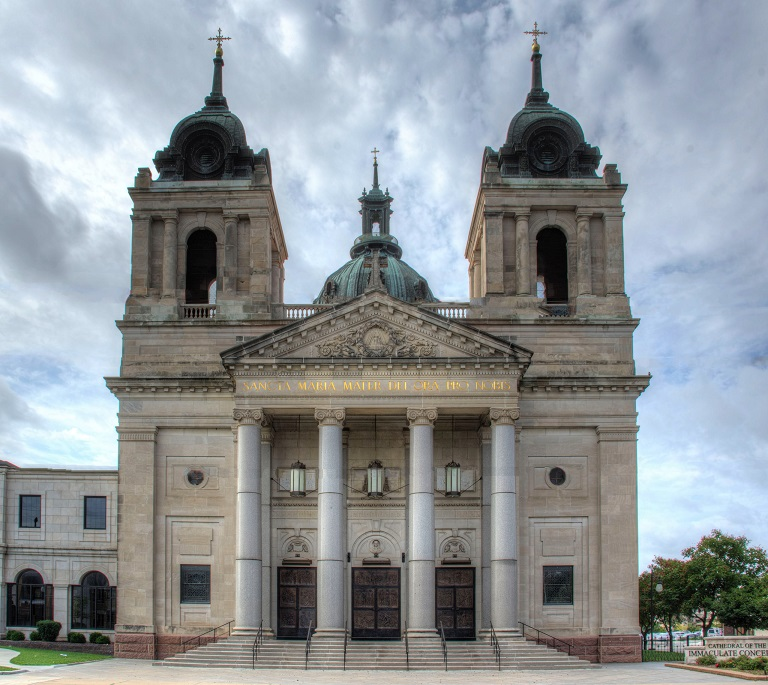
Cathedral of the Immaculate Conception (2016)

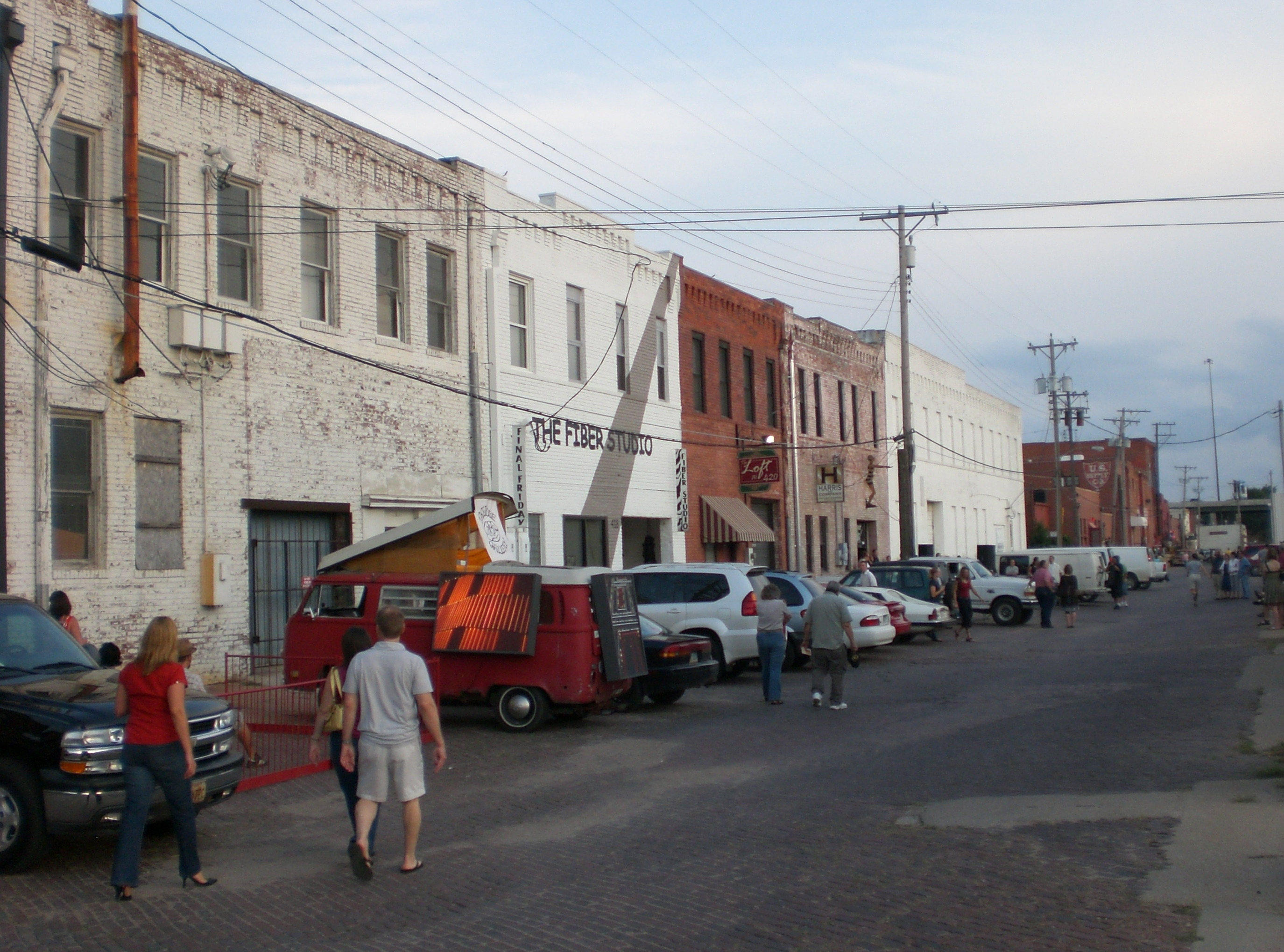
The Commerce Street Arts District (2008)

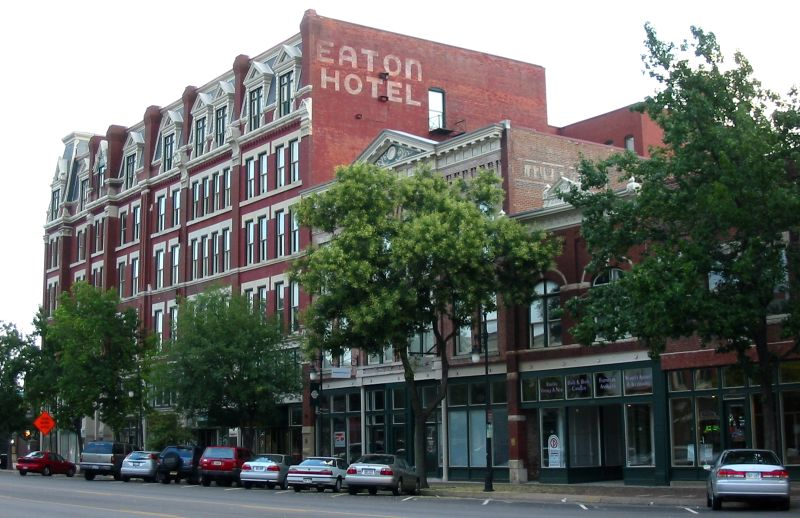
The Eaton Hotel building (2006)

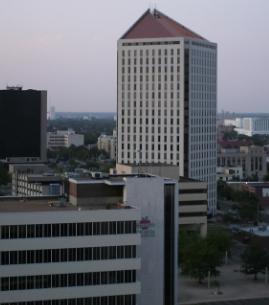
The Epic Center, the tallest building in Wichita (2006)

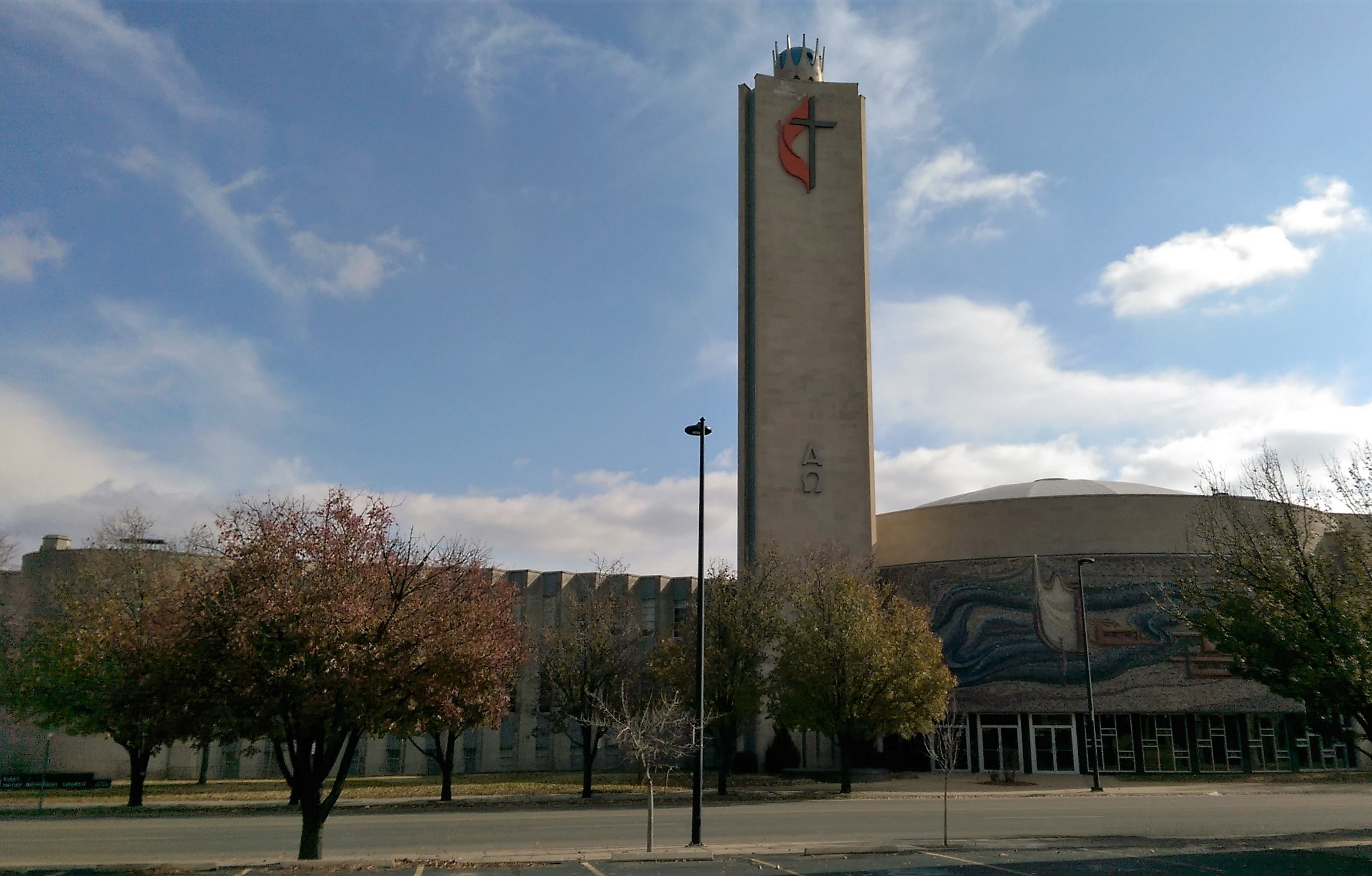
First United Methodist Church (2018)

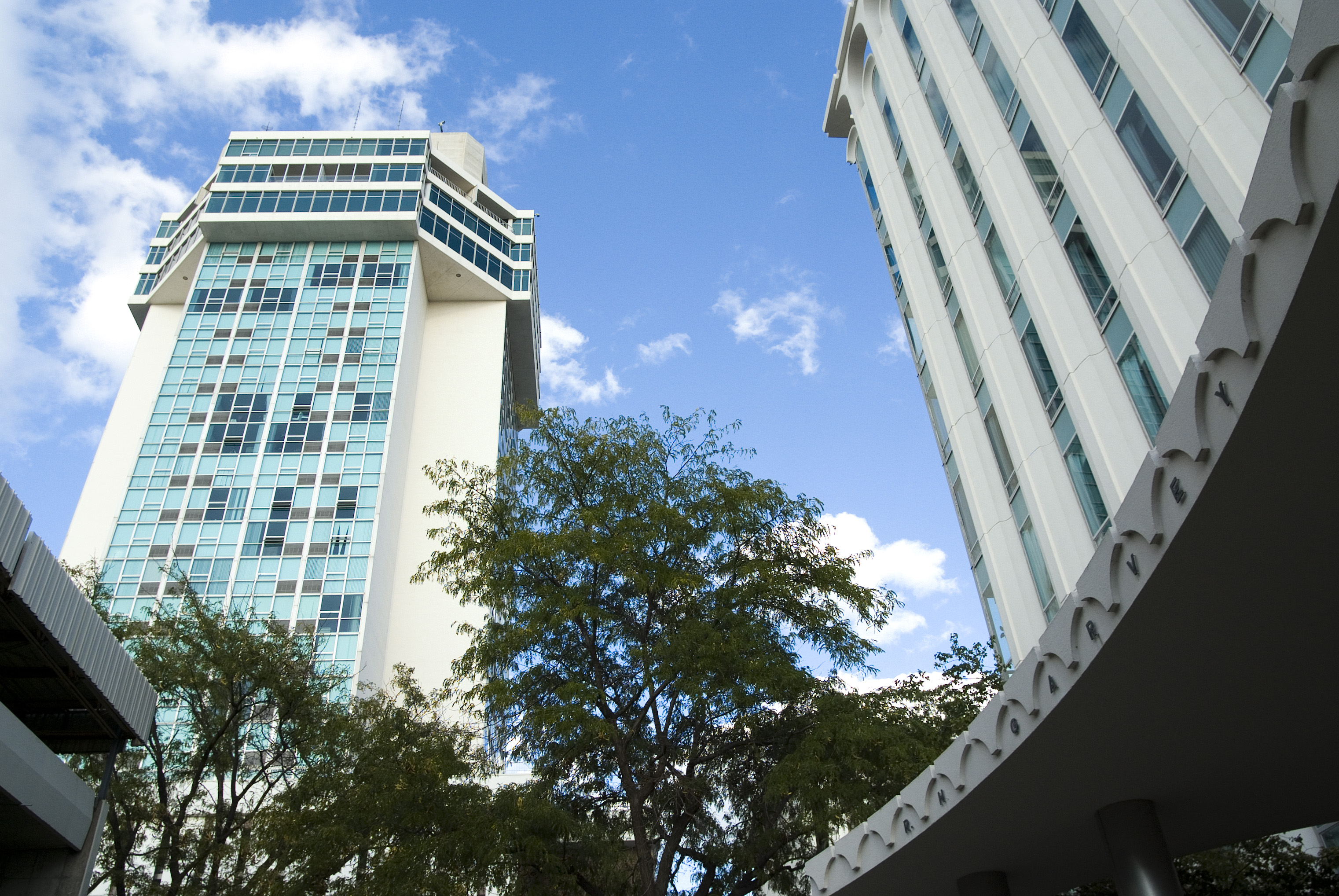
The Garvey Center (2009)

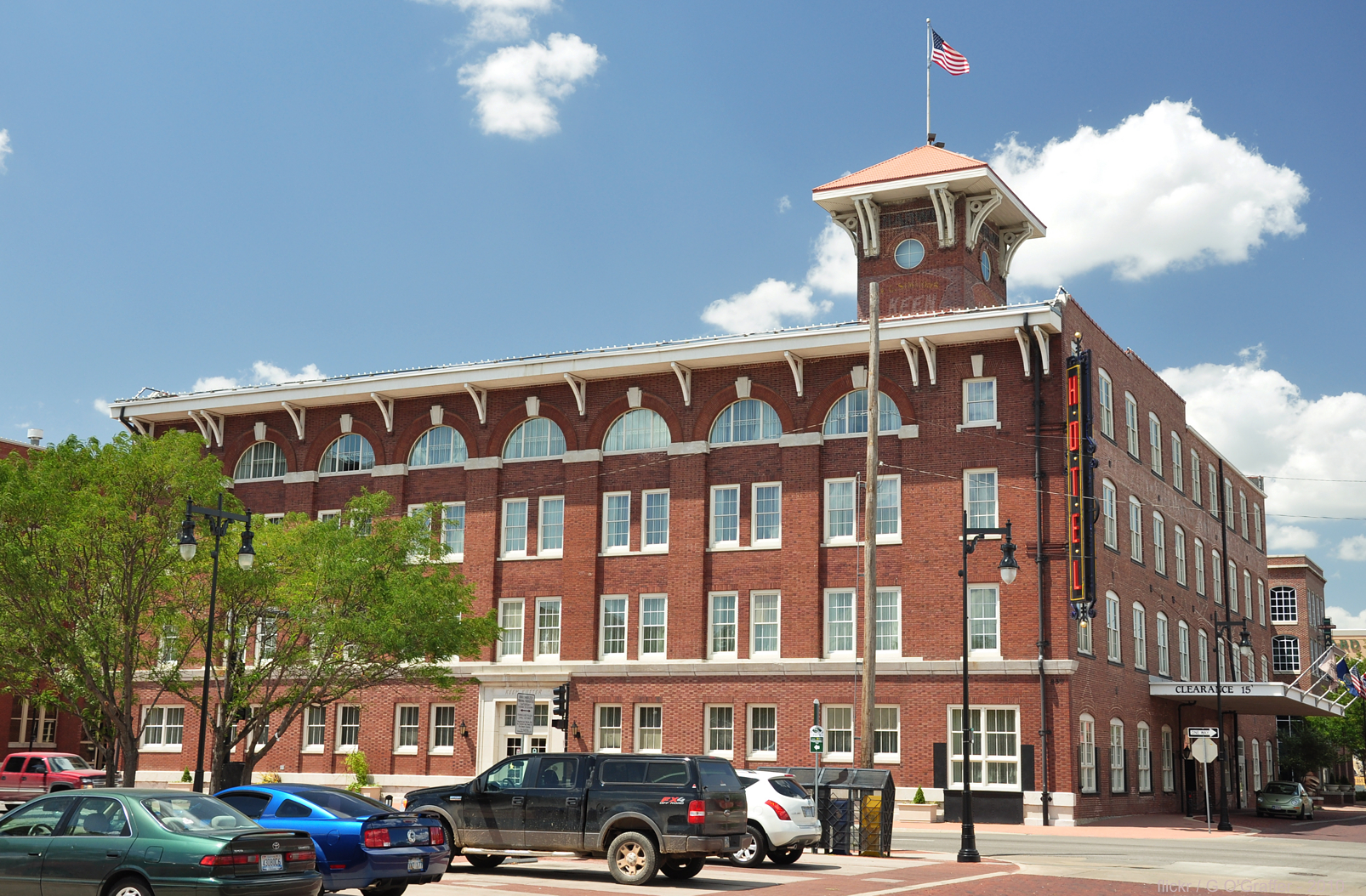
The hotel at Old Town (2010)

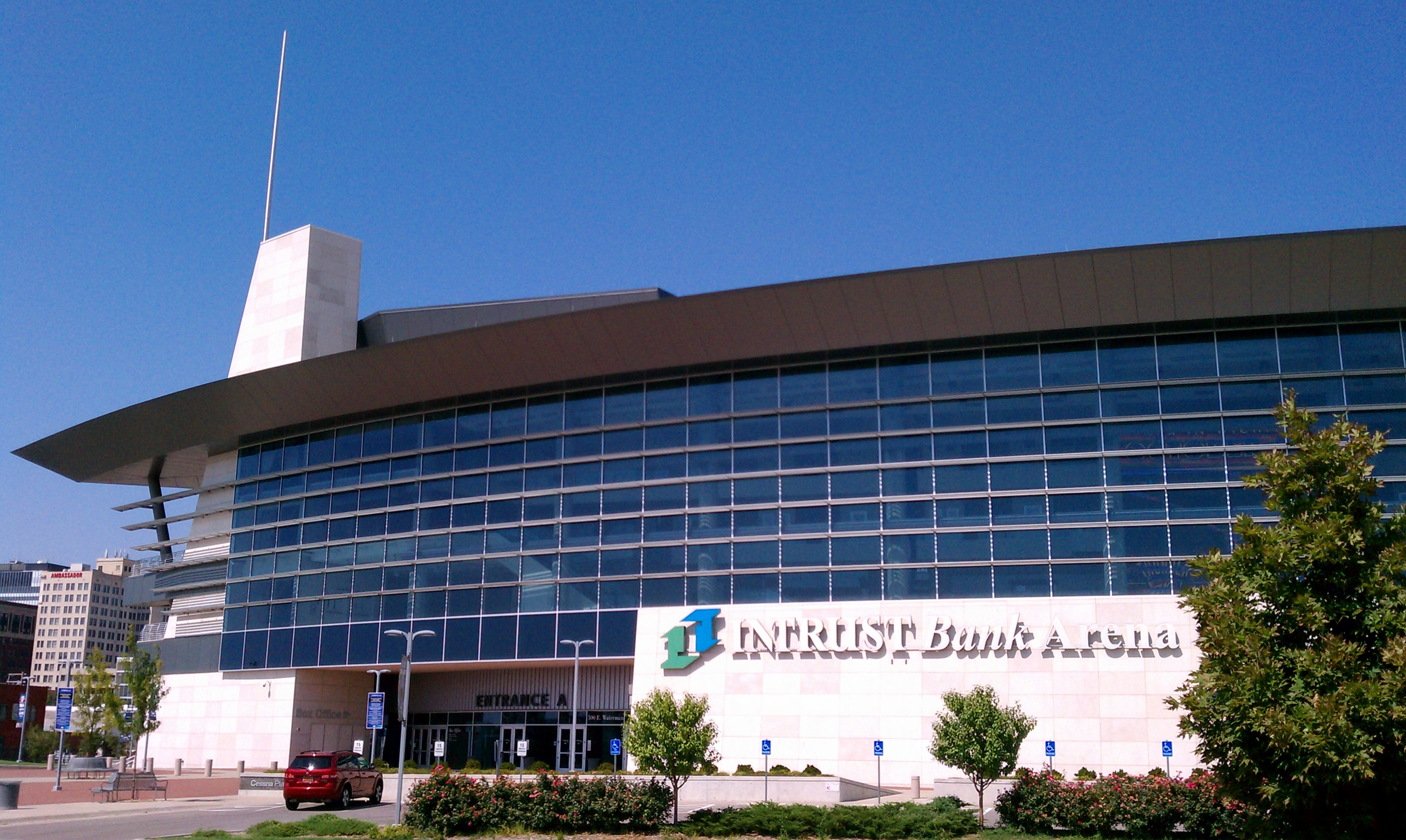
Intrust Bank Arena (2013)

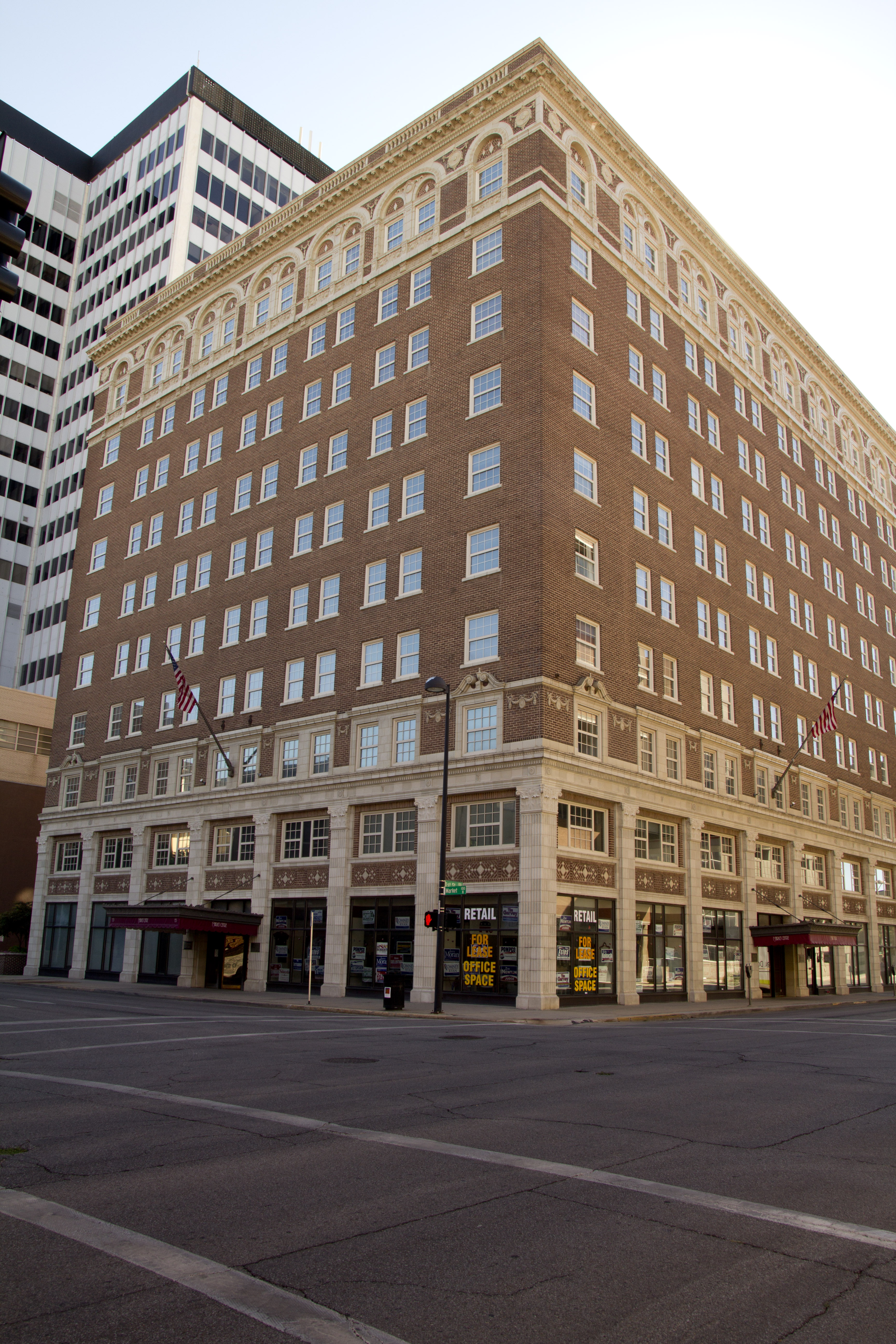
Market Centre (2012)

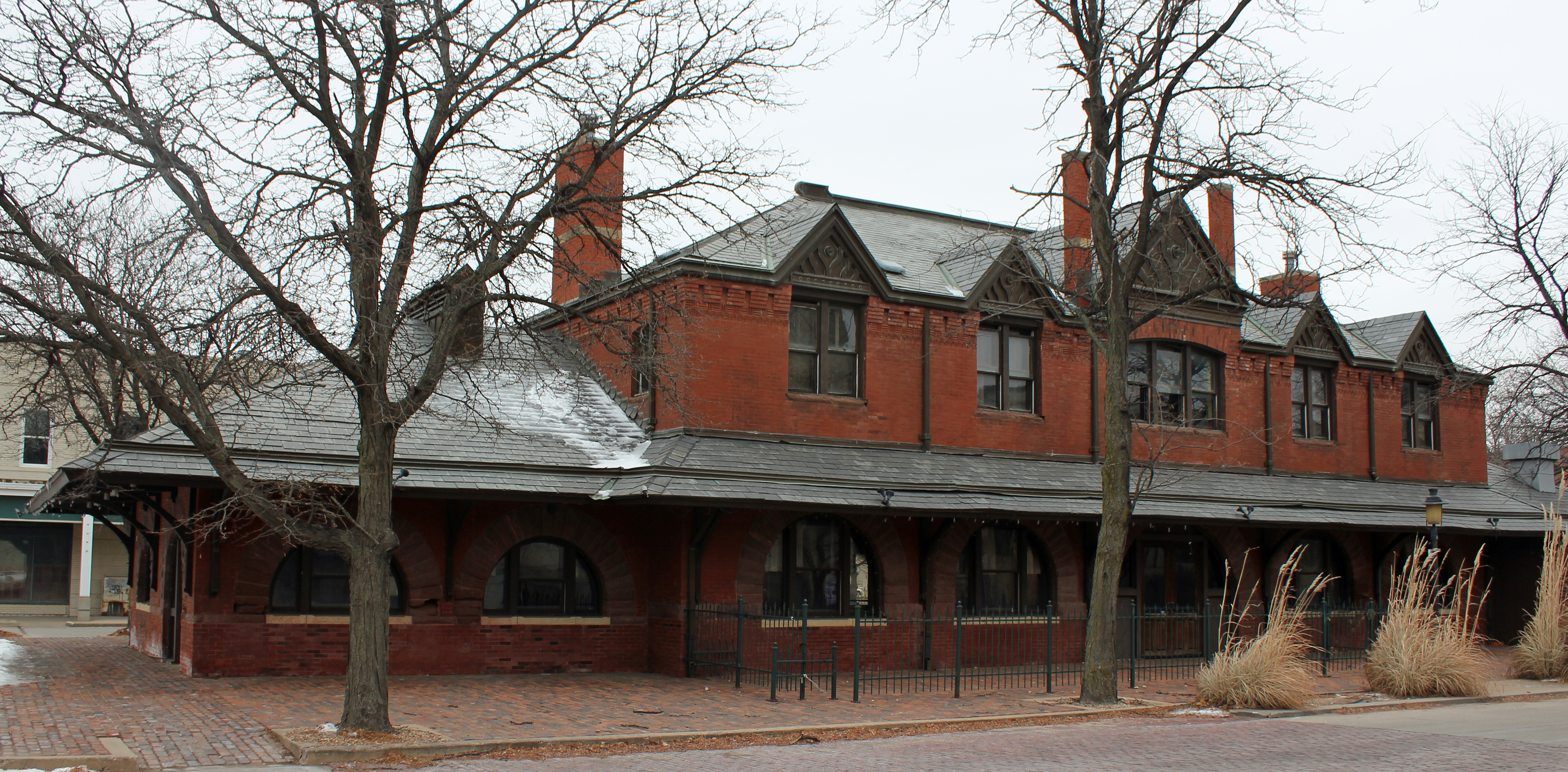
The Rock Island Depot (2013)

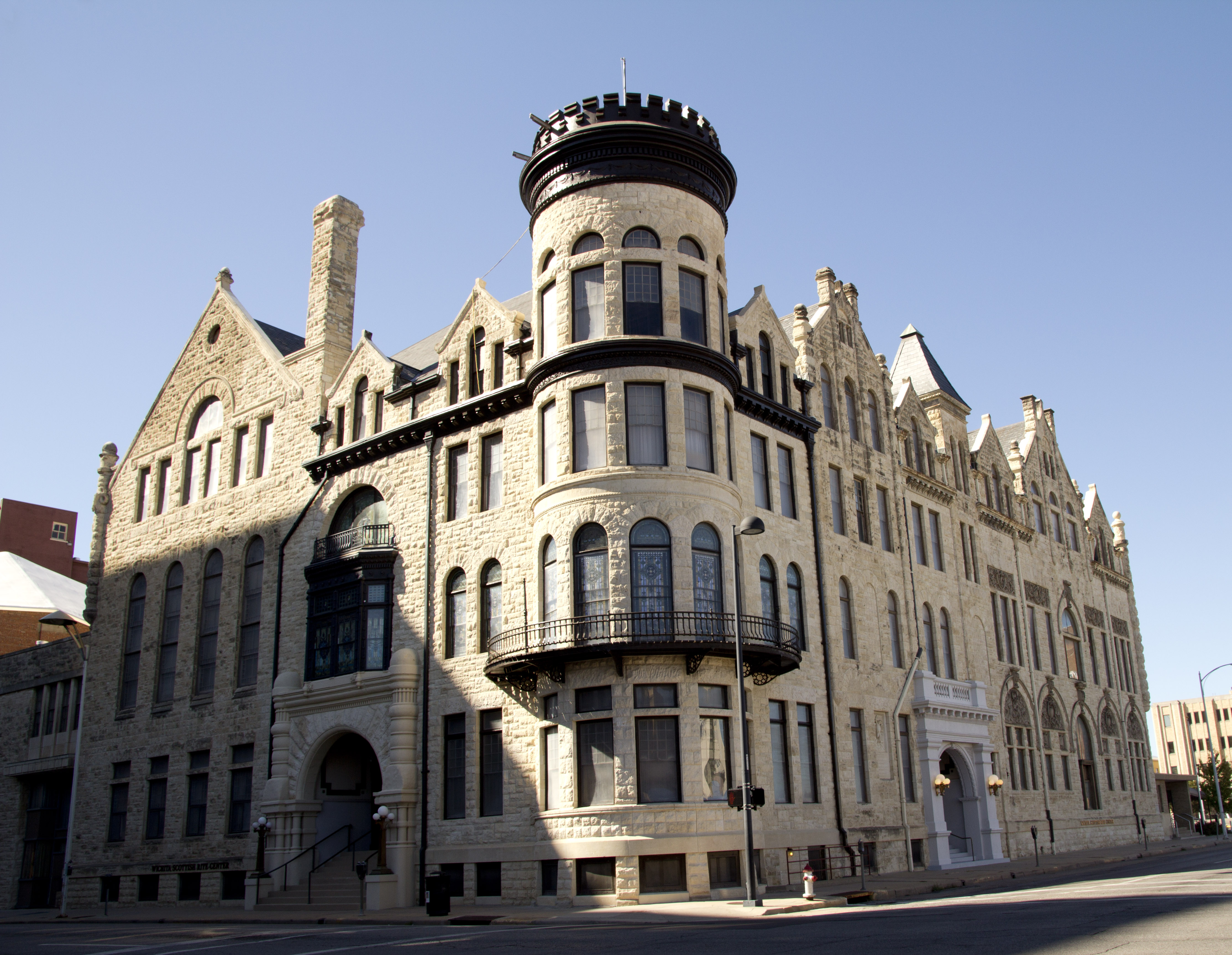
Scottish Rite Temple (2012)

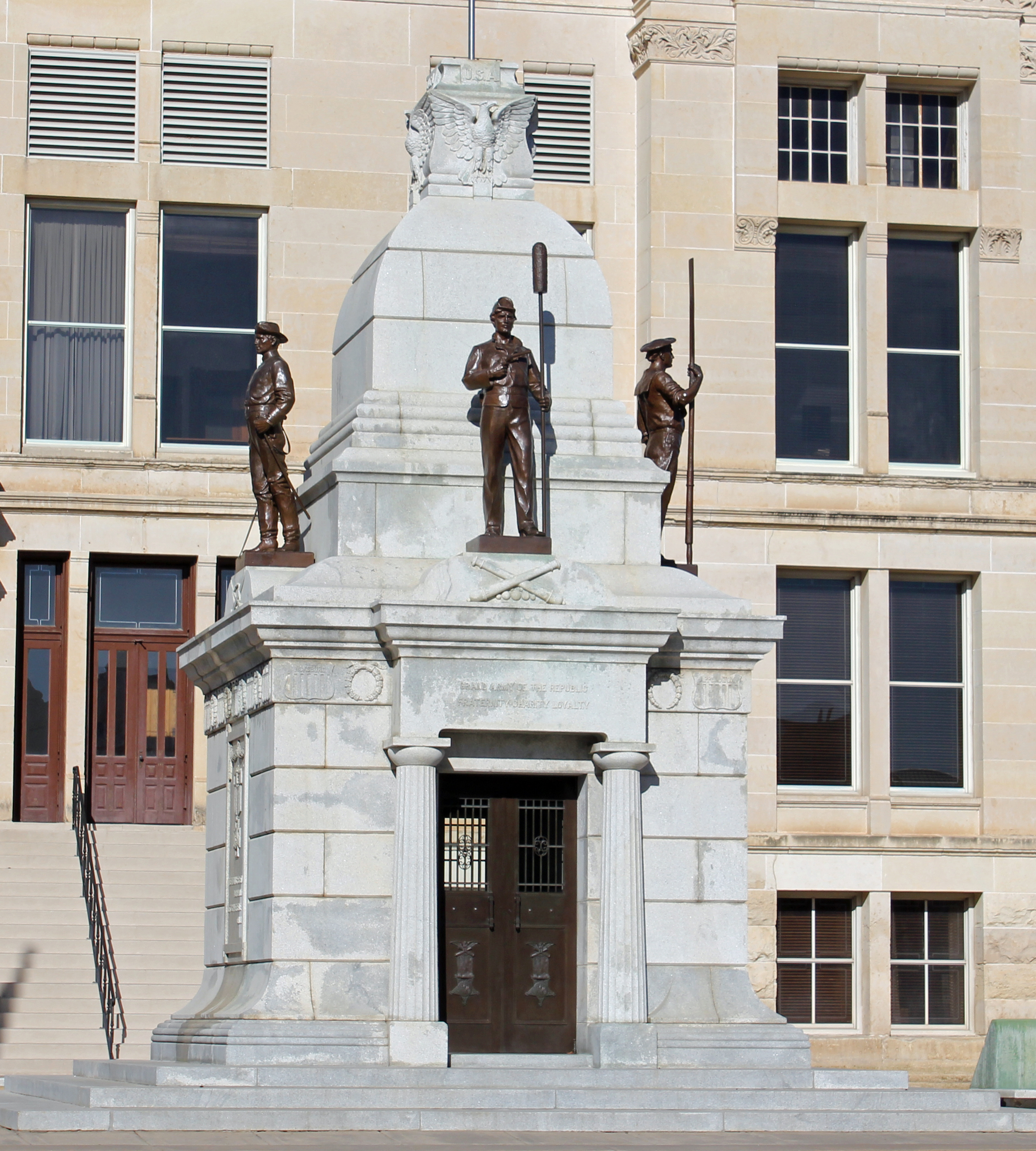
The Sedgwick County Soldiers and Sailors Monument (2013)

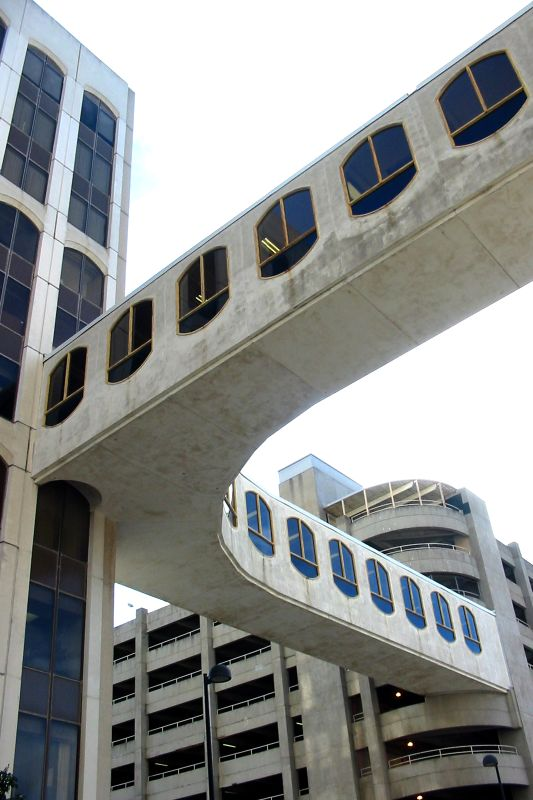
Sutton Place Skywalk (2006)

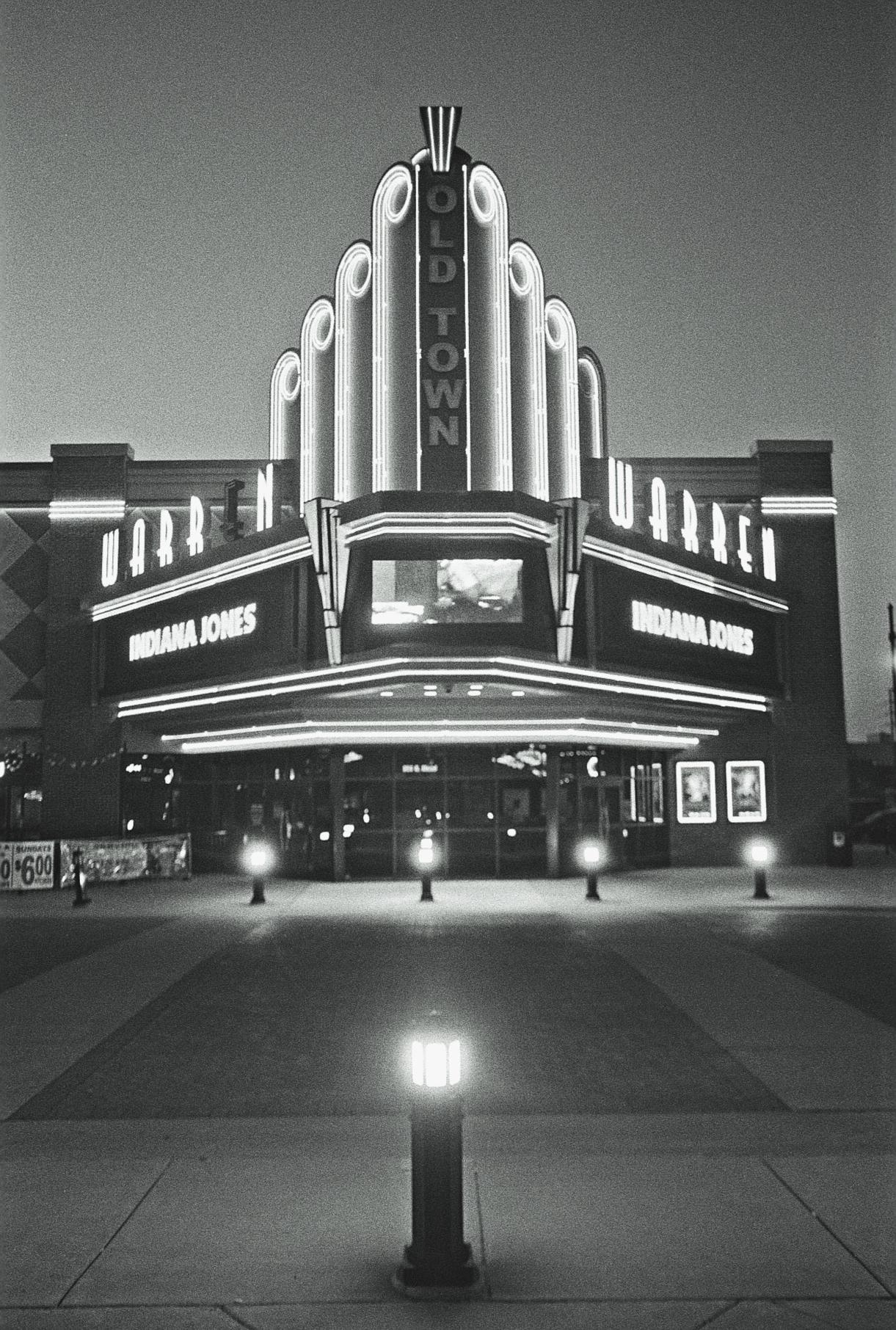
The Warren Theatre in Old Town (2008)

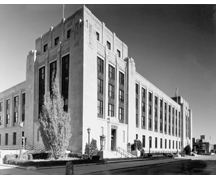
Wichita U.S. Courthouse
