= List of tallest buildings in Kansas =

This list of tallest buildings in Kansas ranks skyscrapers in the U.S. state of Kansas by height. The tallest building in Kansas is the Epic Center in Wichita, which contains 22 floors and is 385 ft (117 m) tall. The second-tallest building in the state is the Kansas State Capitol in Topeka, which rises 306 feet (93 m). https://worldpopulationreview.com/state-rankings/capitol-buildings-by-state

== Tallest buildings ==
This list ranks Kansas buildings that stand at least 213 feet (65 m) tall, based on standard height measurement. This includes spires and architectural details but does not include antenna masts or other objects not part of the original plans. Existing structures are included for ranking purposes based on present height.

Rank	Name	Image	Height ft (m)	Floors	Year	City	Notes
1	Epic Center		320 (98)	22	1987	Wichita	Has been the tallest building in the state of Kansas since its completion in 1987.
2	Kansas State Capitol		306 (93)	5	1866	Topeka	
3	250 Douglas Place		262 (80)	26	1969	Wichita	Tallest building in Wichita from 1969 to 1987; has the greatest number of floors of any building in Wichita.
4	125 N. Market		250 (76)	19	1963	Wichita	
5	Lighton Plaza I		254 (77)	15	1991	Overland Park	
6	Sheraton Overland Park		240 (73)	23	2003	Overland Park	
7	Townsite Tower		235 (72)	17	1970	Topeka	
8	7101 Tower		226 (69)	15	1987	Overland Park	
9	US Bank Tower		224.5 (68)	16	1969	Topeka	
10	Hyatt Regency Hotel		223 (67)	17	1997	Wichita	
11	DoubleTree Overland Park		218 (66)	18	1982	Overland Park	
12	40 Corporate Woods		216 (66)	16	1980	Overland Park	

== See also ==
- List of tallest buildings in Wichita
- List of tallest buildings in the United States
- List of tallest buildings by U.S. state
- List of tallest buildings in Kansas City, Missouri
