= Robert Bingaman =

American artist (born 1981)

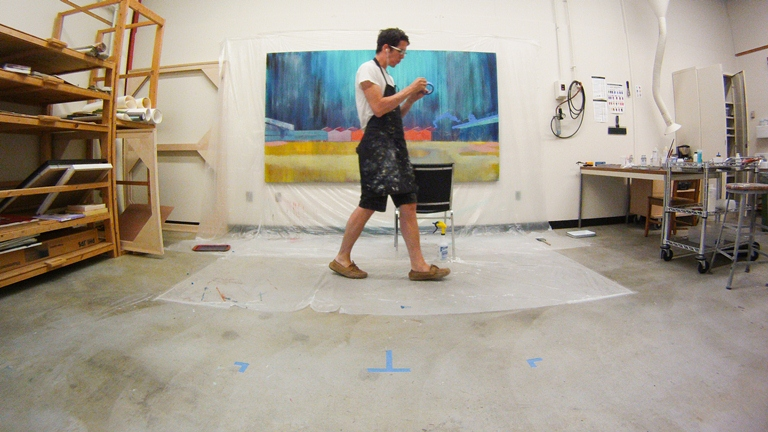
- Still from a time-lapse video documenting Bingaman's painting process for New American Paintings "In the Studio" blog.
- Born: November 4, 1981; Wichita, Kansas, U.S.
- Education: University of Kansas; Washington University in St. Louis
- Website: https://robertbingaman.com/

Robert Josiah Bingaman (born Wichita, Kansas November 4, 1981) is an American artist known for his large-scale paintings and works on paper inspired by his semi-suburban midwestern upbringing.

== Career ==
Robert Bingaman studied painting at the University of Kansas (BFA, 2005) and visual arts at Sam Fox School of Design & Visual Arts at Washington University in St. Louis (MFA, 2007). His career began in earnest in 2014 after he gave an artist's talk at the Nerman Museum of Contemporary Art, where he captivated the Kansas City art world with his series of Night Pools, declaring “I make paintings of things I care about.” Things he cares about can be summarized as: the suburban landscape, the wonder of nature, and popular American architecture and design. Bingaman has used his personal travels and literary sources as inspiration for his work, citing Cormac McCarthy, David Foster Wallace, and W.G. Sebald for their influence.

Bingaman is represented by Haw Contemporary in Kansas City, Missouri and currently lives and works in Humboldt, Kansas.

== Exhibitions ==
In 2014, selections from "Night Pools" were shown in his first one-person museum show at the Nerman Museum of Contemporary Art in Overland Park, Kansas. He expanded upon the pool motif with large-scale paintings for "Until It's All You See", a solo exhibition at Studios Inc, as part of a three-year residency program in Kansas City.

== Public Collections ==
- The Art of Emprise, Emprise Bank, Wichita, Kansas
- Inergy, Kansas City, Missouri
- KPMG, Kansas City, Missouri
- Lockton, Kansas City, Missouri
- The University of Kansas School of Business, Lawrence, Kansas
- Nerman Museum of Contemporary Art, Overland Park, Kansas

== Bibliography ==
- Abeln, Tracy, "At Studios Inc, Robert Bingaman's pools run deep", The Pitch, 2015, December
- Hoedel, Cindy, "Meet artist Robert Bingaman, whose pools of light reflect desire and void", The Kansas City Star, 2015, November
- Waxman, Lori, "What's new in American painting, here?", The Chicago Tribune, 2015, August
- Thorson, Alice, "The Year in Visual Art", The Kansas City Star, 2014, December
- Self, Dana, "Robert Bingaman’s shimmering ‘Night Pools’ offer a portal to the unknown", The Kansas City Star, 2014, July
- Thorson, Alice, "Nerman Museum gift shop to become Kansas Focus Gallery", The Kansas City Star, 2014, July
- Cook, Liz, "At Kemper at the Crossroads, there’s no place like home", The Pitch, 2013, June
- Thorson, Alice, "Kemper at the Crossroads Exhibit Highlights Kansas City Artists’ Vigor and Invention", The Kansas City Star, 2014, June
- Thorson, Alice, "‘Night Pools’ at Nerman Museum Leads a Lively Roster of Summer Art Exhibits", The Kansas City Star, 2014, May
- Eler, Alicia, "Meditations from the Middle", Hyperallergic, 2014, May
- Doolittle, Kayti, "State of the Arts: The effect of regionalism at Kemper in the Crossroads exhibit", Ink Magazine, 2014, April
- Kirby, Lauren, "KC Artists Take Studio Break And Paint Outdoors", KCUR.org, 2014, February
- Newman, Michelle Alexis, "The Landscape Paintings of Robert Josiah Bingaman", Beautiful Decay, 2013, February
- Kirsch, Elisabeth, "Plein Air, Plus Friends", The Kansas City Star Magazine, 2013, July
- Wilkins, Holly, "Meet Robert Josiah Bingaman and his magnificent technicolor paintings", It's Nice That, 2013, May
- Bembnister, Theresa, "Brushing up against the Kansas City Plein Air Coterie", The Pitch, 2013, February
- Caldwell, Ellen C., "In the Studio: The Process of a Painting with Robert Josiah Bingaman", newamericanpaintings.com, 2012, October
- Smith, Raechell, "Robert Josiah Bingaman", Catalogue Essay for The Kansas City Collection 2012–13, 2012, June
