= 125 N Market =

125 North Market
- 125 N Market viewed from Main Street
- Interactive map of the 125 North Market area

General information
- Status: Completed
- Type: Office / mixed-use
- Location: Wichita, Kansas, United States, 125 N Market St
- Coordinates: 37°41′14″N 97°20′14″W
- Completed: 1963
- Opening: January 1963

Height
- Roof: 250 ft (76 m)

Technical details
- Floor count: 19
- Floor area: 222,679 sq ft (20,691 m²)

125 North Market (also known as New York Life Building, formerly the Wichita Executive Centre, and originally the Wichita Plaza) is a high-rise office building in Downtown Wichita, Kansas. Completed in 1963, the 19-story tower is among the tallest buildings in the city, ranking third as of 2025.

== History ==
The building opened in January 1963 as the Wichita Plaza. For several years, it was the tallest building in Wichita until surpassed by the Holiday Inn Plaza (now the Garvey Center) in 1969.

A major renovation was carried out in 2017, updating its HVAC, elevators, roof, water lines, signage, and parking garage.

In 2021, a redevelopment plan was announced to convert portions of the tower into a mixed-use project including residential units, retail space, and a rooftop "sky park" with pool. Financing delays, however, have postponed full implementation.

The building is classified as a Class B office property.

== Tenants and usage ==
125 N Market has traditionally been an office tower with ground-floor retail. Leasing information lists amenities such as a conference center, onsite restaurant, and structured parking.

== Significance ==
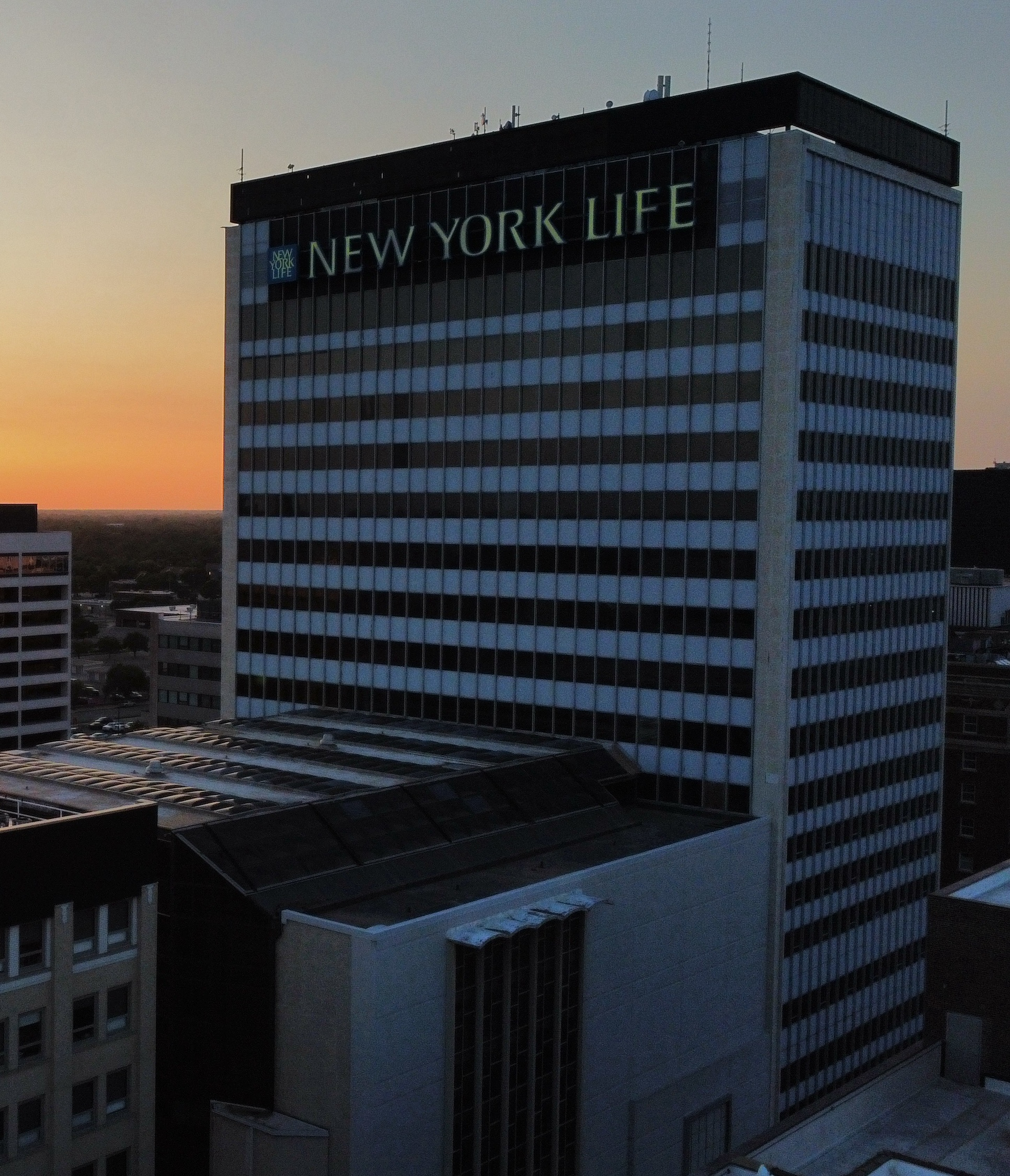
Aerial view of 125 N Market from southeast

The tower is considered a downtown Wichita landmark and remains one of the tallest structures in the city. Its planned conversion to mixed-use space reflects wider trends in downtown revitalization and adaptive reuse of mid-20th century high-rises.

== See also ==
- List of tallest buildings in Wichita
- Epic Center
- Downtown Wichita
