= The Wichita Eagle =

Newspaper in Wichita, Kansas, U.S.

- The December 20, 2016 front page of The Wichita Eagle
- Type: Daily newspaper
- Format: Broadsheet
- Owner: The McClatchy Company
- Editor: Michael Roehrman
- Founded: 1872
- Headquarters: 301 N. Main St. Wichita, Kansas 67202; United States
- Circulation: 31,022 Daily; 65,819 Sunday (as of 2020)
- ISSN: 1046-3127
- OCLC number: 20386511
- Website: kansas.com

The Wichita Eagle is a newspaper published in Wichita, Kansas, United States. Originating in the early 1870s, shortly after the city's founding, it is owned by The McClatchy Company and is the largest newspaper in Wichita and the surrounding area.

In September, 1960, The Wichita Eagle purchased the assets of its longtime chief rival, the Wichita Beacon, it became The Wichita Eagle and Beacon or The Wichita Eagle-Beacon, until the Beacon moniker was dropped in 1989.

== History ==
=== Origins ===
In 1870, The Vidette was the first newspaper established in Wichita by Fred A. Sowers and W. B. Hutchinson. It operated briefly.

On April 12, 1872, The Wichita Eagle was founded and edited by Marshall M. Murdock, and it became a daily paper in May 1884. His son, Victor Murdock, was a reporter for the paper during his teens, the managing editor from 1894 to 1903, an editor from the mid-1920s until his death in 1945.

In October 1872, The Wichita Daily Beacon was founded by Fred A. Sowers and David Millison. It published daily for two months, then weekly until 1884 when it went back to daily. In 1907, Henry Allen purchased the Beacon and was publisher for many years. In 1926, the Levand brothers, Max, Leonard, John and Louis purchased the Wichita Beacon from Senator Henry Allen. The Levand brothers had grown up in Denver selling the Denver Post on the street-corners of Denver. Max Levand remained editor, publisher until his death in March 1960.

=== Mergers ===
The Eagle and Beacon competed for 88 years, then in 1960 the Eagle purchased the Beacon. Both newspapers continued to be published, the Eagle in the morning, the Beacon in the evening, the Eagle and Beacon on Sunday.

In 1973, the Murdock family sold the paper to Ridder Publications. Ridder and Knight Newspapers merged in 1974 to form Knight Ridder, which combined the two newspapers into The Wichita Eagle-Beacon in 1980.

In 1989, the Beacon name was dropped, and the newspaper became The Wichita Eagle.

In 2006, the Eagle became part of The McClatchy Company when McClatchy bought Knight Ridder.

=== Internet ===
On November 18, 1996, the Eagle launched its first website, Wichita Online, at wichitaeagle.com. On January 22, 2000, it shifted its primary content to the domain kansas.com.

=== Move ===
In spring 2016, McClatchy Company announced that it would transfer printing of the Eagle from Wichita to its Kansas City Star printing line in Kansas City, Missouri, which already prints other newspapers such as Lawrence Journal-World and Topeka Capital-Journal. The move eliminated 27 full-time and 47 part-time jobs. The building will be sold and the editing staff will move to a smaller location in downtown Wichita. In fall 2016, Cargill announced that it would move its "Protein Group" headquarters from downtown Wichita into a new $60 Million building on the site of the former Eagle building at 825 East Douglas Avenue in Old Town.

In January 2017, the paper announced it had signed a deal for office space in the Old Town area of downtown Wichita. It plans to move newsroom and advertising employees to 330 North Mead (from 825 East Douglas) in the spring of 2017. The new site is located southeast of the Warren Old Town Theater.

Effective October 23, 2023, the paper's daily print edition will be delivered via the U.S. Mail instead of delivery by a local carrier.

In April 2024, The Eagle announced it was moving to the Epic Center in downtown Wichita at 301 N. Main St. The new site is one block from The Eagle's first home in 1872, in a wood building at Third and Main streets.

In September 2024, the Eagle moved to a three day printing schedule, printing a Wednesday, Friday and Sunday edition.

== See also ==
- List of newspapers in Kansas
