= List of tallest buildings in Wichita =

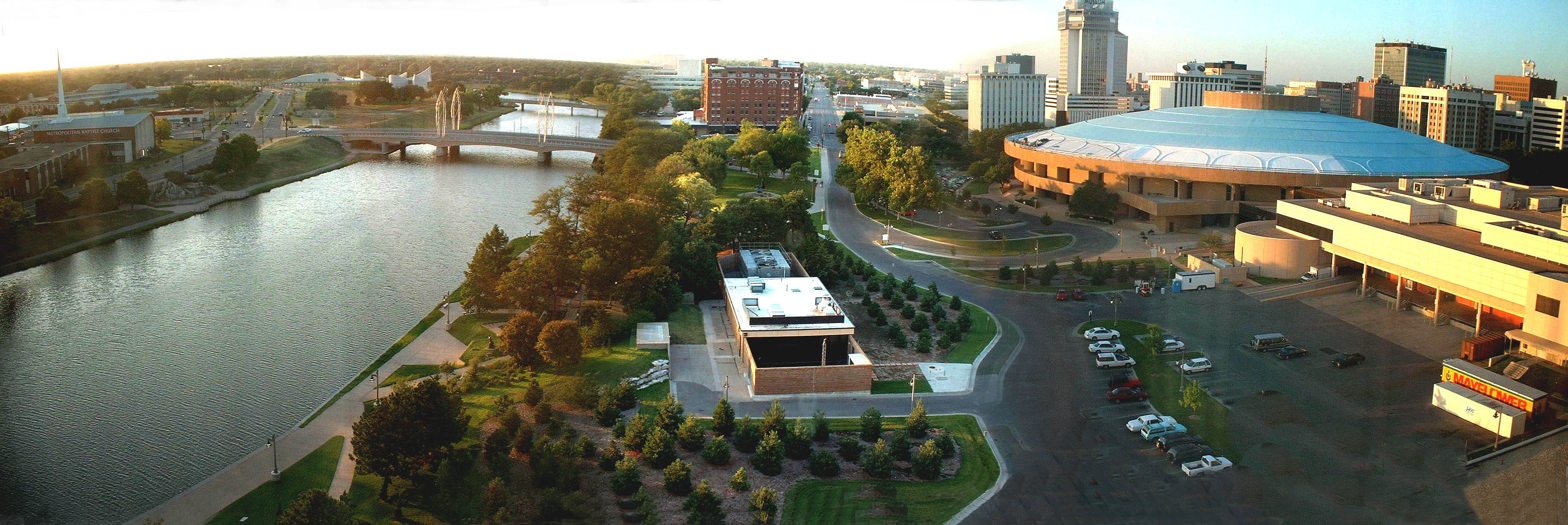
Downtown Wichita off to the right

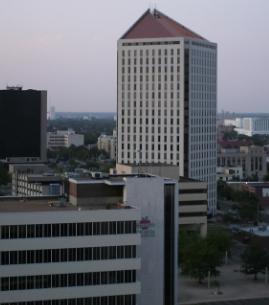
The Epic Center is the tallest building in Wichita and Kansas

This list of tallest buildings in Wichita ranks high-rise buildings in Wichita, Kansas, United States, at least 100 feet (30 m) tall, based on standard height measurement. This measurement includes architectural features (such as spires), but not radio masts and towers. As of 2026, the tallest building in Wichita is Epic Center (1987) at 385 feet (117 m).

== Tallest buildings ==
Rank	Name	Height ft (m)	Floors	Year	Notes
1	Epic Center	320 (98)	22	1987	Has been the tallest building in Wichita and the state of Kansas since its completion in 1987.
2	250 Douglas Place	262 (80)	26	1969	Tallest building in Wichita from 1969 to 1987; has the most floors in Wichita of any building.
3	125 N Market	250 (76)	19	1963	Tallest building in Wichita from 1963 to 1969.
4	Hyatt Regency Hotel	223 (67)	17	1997	
5	Ambassador Hotel Wichita	172 (52)	14	1926	
6	Wichita City Hall	171 (52)	17	1976	
7	AT&T Engineering Building	161 (49)	12	1990	
8	AC Hotel Wichita Downtown	157 (48)	11	1927	
9	The Douglas Tower I	151 (46)	11	1911	Formerly the Bitting Building
10	Highland House Apartments	148 (45)	12	1965	
11	Sutton Place	147 (45)	11	1966	
12	High Touch Building	141 (43)	10	1910	
13	Century Plaza	137 (42)	10	1930	
14	One Main Place	131 (40)	10	1911	
15	Wichita Marriott	128 (39)	11	1987	Tallest building on the eastern side of Wichita.
16	General Mills Tower	127 (39)	9	1920	
17	Board of Trade Center	112 (34)	7	1921	
18	Petroleum Building	111 (34)	8	1929	
19	Exchange Place	110 (34)	8	1920	
