= 250 Douglas Place =

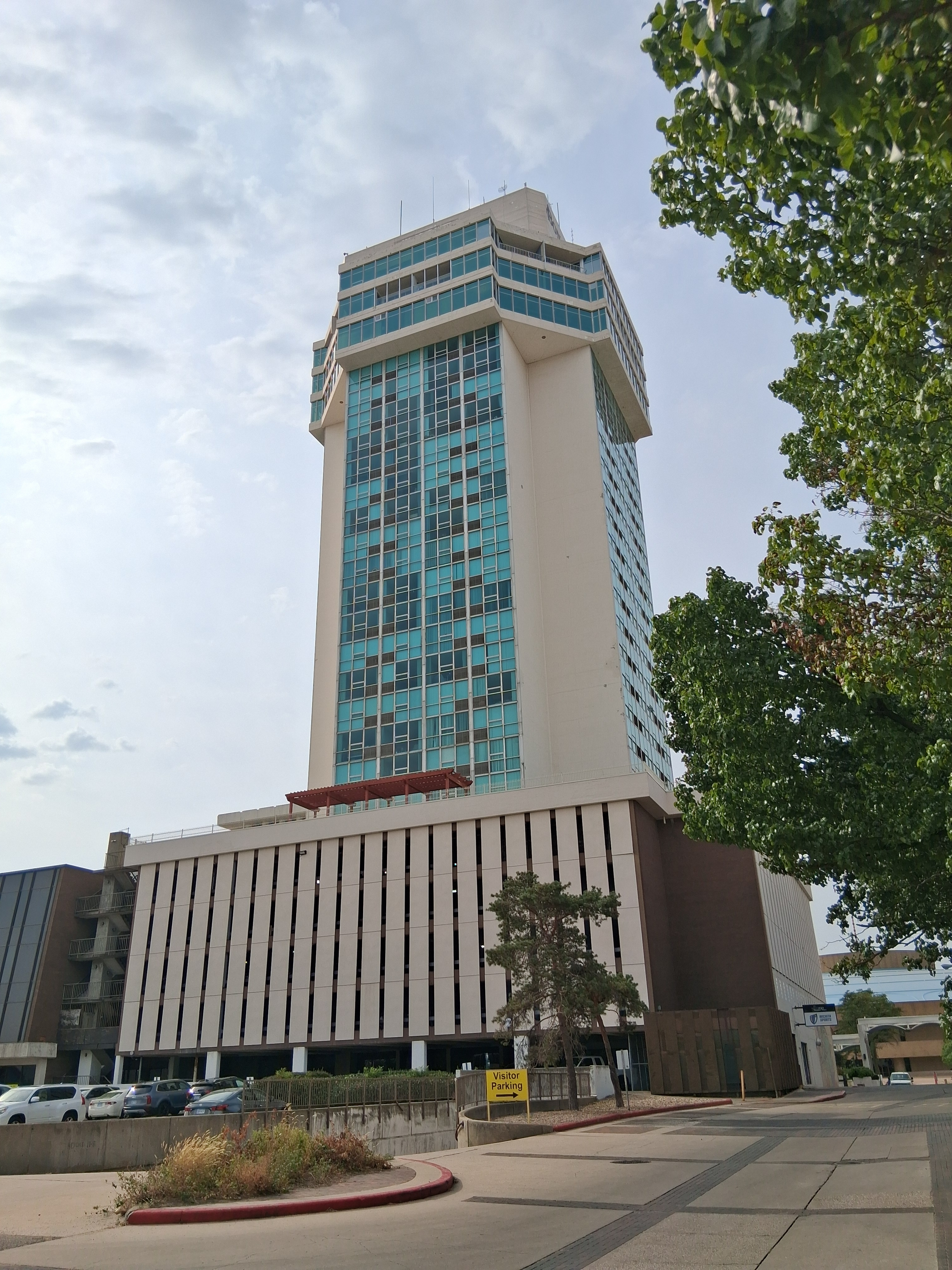
- 250 Douglas Place in 2026
- Interactive map of the 250 Douglas Place area

General information
- Status: Completed
- Type: Commercial office, residential, restaurant
- Location: Wichita, Kansas
- Coordinates: 37°41′13″N 97°20′25″W
- Completed: 1970
- Opening: 1970

Height
- Roof: 262 ft (80 m)

Technical details
- Floor count: 26

Website
- www.250douglasplace.com

250 Douglas Place is a high-rise apartment building in Wichita, Kansas. It is located in the Garvey Center development. It is the second-tallest building in both Wichita and the state of Kansas. In 2021, it was listed on the National Register of Historic Places.

== History ==
The Holiday Inn Plaza hotel opened in July 1970, as part of the Garvey Center, which also contained two 10-story office towers. The hotel was the tallest building in Wichita until the Epic Center was built in 1987. Even today, it remains the building with the most floors in the state.

On August 11, 1976, Michael Soles, an unemployed welder from Sand Springs, Oklahoma, set up a sniper position on the hotel. Over the course of an eleven-minute shooting spree, he killed three and wounded six others. The gunman was eventually wounded by the police and taken into custody.

The hotel made an appearance in the 1976 film King Kung Fu (a low-budget knock-off of King Kong).

The hotel left Holiday Inn in 1987 and became the Century II Plaza Hotel. Beginning in 1997, it was gradually converted to an apartment building, with each apartment made by combining two old hotel rooms. The conversion was fully completed in 2015 and the tower was renamed 250 Douglas Place.

== See also ==
- List of tallest buildings in Wichita
- List of tallest buildings by U.S. state
- National Register of Historic Places listings in Sedgwick County, Kansas
