= Emprise Bank =

Bank primarily located in Kansas

Emprise Financial Corporation
- Type: Private
- Industry: Finance
- Founded: Wichita, Kansas, United States
- Headquarters: Kansas
- Key people: Matt Michaelis, Chairman & President
- Products: Banking
- Website: https://www.emprisebank.com

Emprise Bank is a Kansas-based, family owned, community bank headquartered in Wichita, Kansas with more than $2 billion in assets. Emprise has 34 locations across the state of Kansas, including branches in Wichita, Andover, Augusta, Chanute, Clearwater, Council Grove, Derby, El Dorado, Eureka, Goddard, Hays, Haysville, Hillsboro, Humboldt, Iola, Lawrence, McPherson, Moran, Park City, Potwin, Valley Center and Kansas City.

== History ==
The history of Emprise Bank began in 1910 with the formation of Stockyards National Bank in Wichita, Kansas. In 1965, W.A. Michaelis Jr. purchased Sierra Petroleum Co. Inc., which owned Stockyards National Bank. In the early 1970s, Stockyards Bank was renamed United American Bank & Trust Company to reflect the bank's expansion into other parts of the city. Sierra later became Emprise Financial Corporation.

Over the next 25 years, the Michaelis family acquired banks in communities across the state including Council Grove, Eureka, Hays, Hillsboro, Iola, Moran, Toronto, and Potwin. During this period, the Michaelis Family also acquired the National Bank of Wichita and Wichita State Bank.

In 1989, the banks located in Wichita were merged and the combined institution was named Emprise Bank. The Michaelis family's banks throughout the state were aligned geographically and merged to form four community bank charters. These banks were renamed Emprise Bank. In the early 1990s, Emprise expanded into Lawrence and added branch locations in the Wichita area. Emprise Bank then acquired Wichita Federal Savings & Loan in the mid-1990s, which increased the bank's market share and doubled its asset size.

In 2002, Emprise opened a location in El Dorado, and in 2003 locations were acquired in Humboldt and Chanute. Over the next two years, the community banks were all merged under one Emprise Bank charter. Then, in November 2006, Emprise Bank merged with Prairie State Bank, adding eleven additional branches to the Emprise network and increasing the number of employees to nearly 500. Through the merger, Emprise Bank reached $1 billion in total assets.

== The Art of Emprise ==
The Art of Emprise is a collection of art owned by the bank. The collection showcases pieces from Kansas artists and now includes works from more than 530 artists. Many of these pieces come from students and faculty at colleges and universities across the state.

In 1980, the Kansas Watercolor Society asked the Emprise Bank to sponsor its annual show; the bank agreed, and began making patron purchases on behalf of the banks. They have continued this sponsorship since, and expanded the Art of Emprise collection well beyond watercolors. Originally, the focus was simply finding unique pieces of art, but that focus changed to include artists with a Kansas connection.

The art is available to be viewed at Emprise Bank locations, as well as some other locations. Works of the collection have been displayed at the Andover Library (Andover, Kan.), Beach Museum (Manhattan, Kan.), Coutts Art Museum (El Dorado, Kan.), Lawrence Arts Center, Ulrich Museum, and the Wichita Art Museum. The collection has also been shared with the U.S. Art in Embassies Program, having works displayed in Belize and Uzbekistan.

== Controversy ==
The bank received media attention in September 2017 after having an Iraqi-American family arrested. Sattar Ali, a doctoral student who had lived in the United States since 1993, tried to deposit a check for $151,000 at Emprise. This sum had been obtained from the sale of their old home in Michigan.

With insufficient verification documents, Ali was handcuffed and had his belongings confiscated after the bank called the police. 4 police cars arrived to arrest Ali at around 11.30am. Police also arrested Ali's wife and 15-year-old daughter, who had been waiting for him in the car outside. Police also called the school of Ali's 11-year-old son to have him detained there while the rest of his family was in custody. Wichita police were able to confirm that the check was legitimate, 48 minutes after the arrest, and released the family around 3.00pm.

“We were devastated. Terrified. Crying the whole time,” Ali said. “We had no idea what the arrest was for.” Emprise claimed that the police were called as the bank had trouble verifying the check.

Emprise Bank released a statement regarding this incident indicating that they saw nothing wrong with the bank branch's action:

".. We are aware of a situation at the 21st and Woodlawn branch yesterday and can confirm that our team acted in accordance with our policies and procedures. If faced with the same circumstances today, we would expect our team to take the same actions."

Ali said in an interview that this had been an example of racial profiling, and questioned why his family had also been arrested: “Let’s assume I made a mistake and gave them a bad check,” Ali said. “Why would they arrest my wife and daughter?”

Ali stated that he had plans to take legal action against the bank for the incident.

The bank subsequently issued an apology: "Bank Chairman Matthew Michealis says the bank is sorry for the incident that occurred on Sept. 6 when a teller called 911 after saying Sattar Ali was trying to deposit a fraudulent $150,000 check.

In his statement, Michaelis says the bank will "conduct a complete review of the incident" with all parties involved. He says Emprise Bank staff will now participate in sensitivity training.

"At Emprise, we believe that what we do and say is a reflection of who we are. We do not tolerate discrimination of any kind," said Michaelis in the statement."

As of 2018, Ali and Emprise have "reached an amicable resolution regarding the incident" outside of court.
