= Wichita-Sedgwick County Historical Museum =

- Old Wichita City Hall
- U.S. National Register of Historic Places
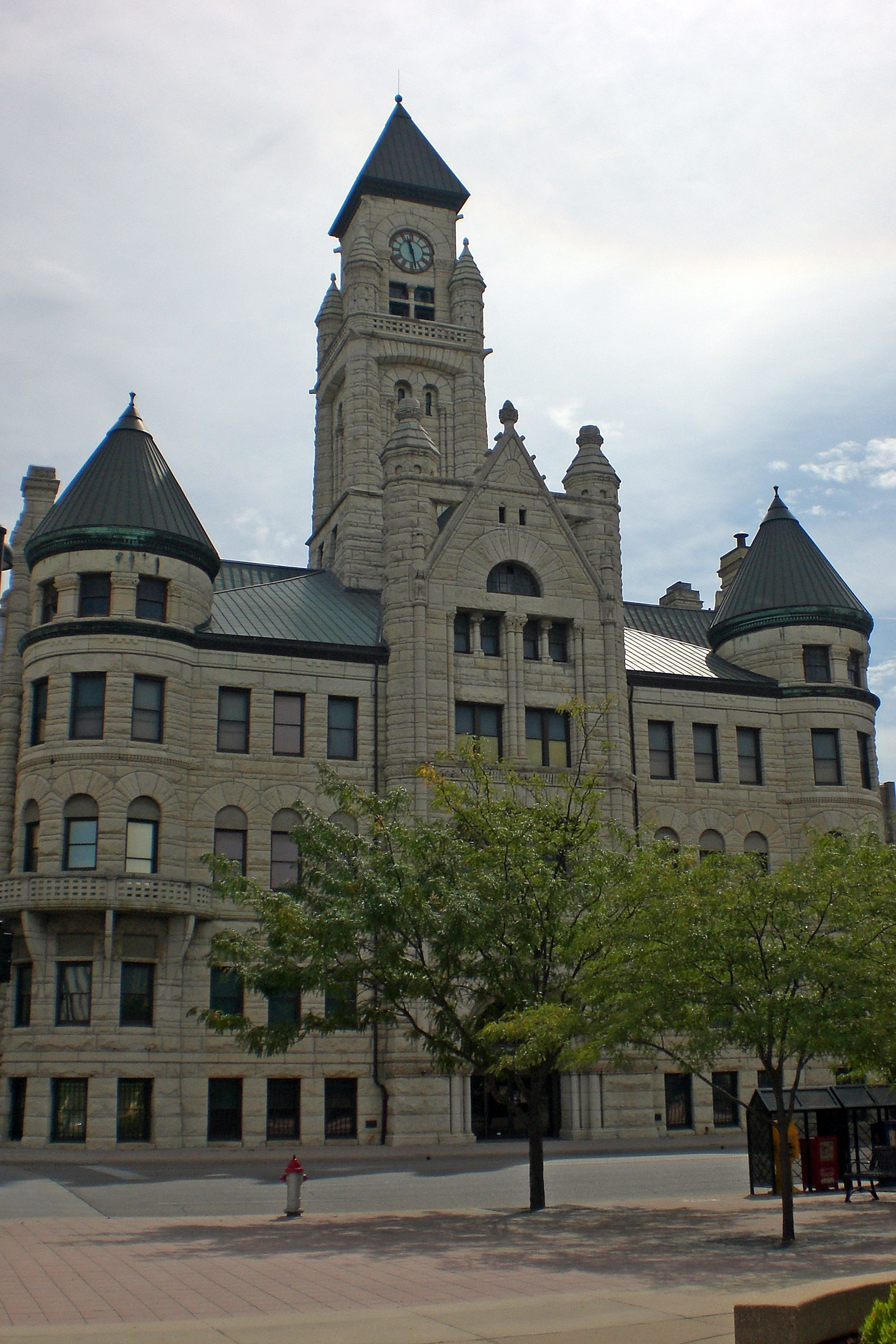
- View of the museum's building

- Location within Kansas Location within the United States
- Location: 204 South Main Street, Wichita, Kansas 67202; United States
- Coordinates: 37°41′5″N 97°20′16″W
- Built: 1889–1892
- Architect: Proudfoot & Bird
- NRHP reference No.: 71000329
- Added to NRHP: May 14, 1971

The Wichita-Sedgwick County Historical Museum is a non-profit 501(c)(3) organization dedicated to preserving and presenting the local history of Wichita and Sedgwick County, Kansas, United States. It is located at 204 South Main (southeast of the corner of Main and William streets), and east of the former Wichita Public Library. The museum is supported in part through city and county funding and through the support of its sizable membership base.

== History ==
The museum was established in 1939 as the Wichita Public Museum. Today the museum resides in the original City Hall building designed by William T. Proudfoot and George W. Bird in 1890.

The museum has been accredited by the American Alliance of Museums since 1972. It has been listed on the National Register of Historic Places since 1971.

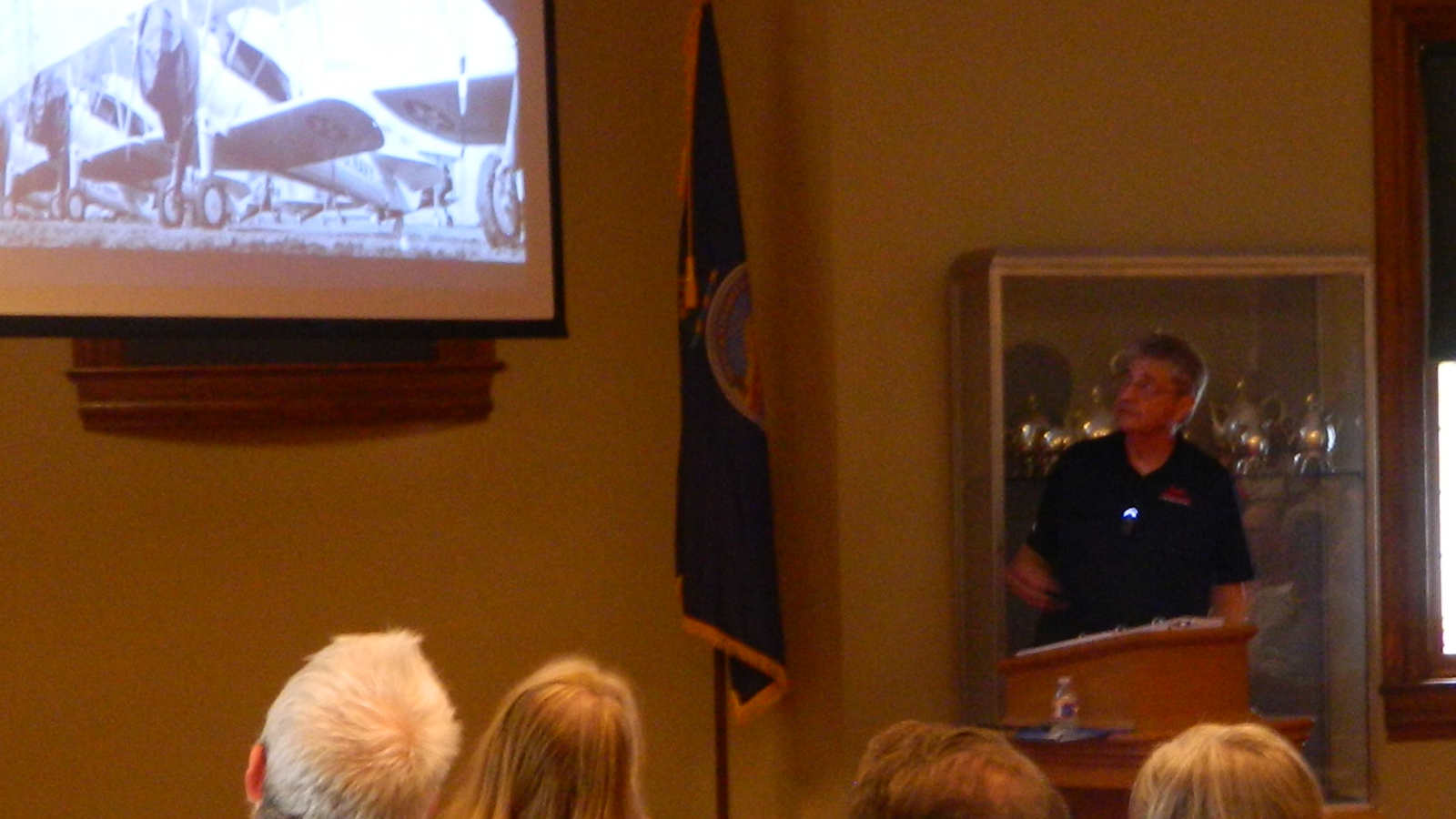
Aviation historian Edward H. Phillips lectures at Stearman Centennial, July 12, 2026, Wichita-Sedgwick County Historical Museum, Kansas

== Exhibits ==
Exhibits are housed on four floors. Museum exhibits include artifacts from early local populations (including Native Americans), an extensive local aviation history section (Wichita is a major aviation history hub), and a locally-manufactured early Jones Six automobile.

== Facilities and programs ==
The facilities are open to the public six days a week for a nominal admission fee. The building includes a lecture hall and gift shop. Lectures on local and regional history are provided by historians, monthly, or more often. School group tours are common during the school year. On certain holidays and special occasions, there is a public concert performed on the carillon in the bell tower.

== See also ==
- History of Wichita, Kansas
- National Register of Historic Places listings in Sedgwick County, Kansas
