= Epic Center =

Commercial high-rise building in Wichita, Kansas, U.S.

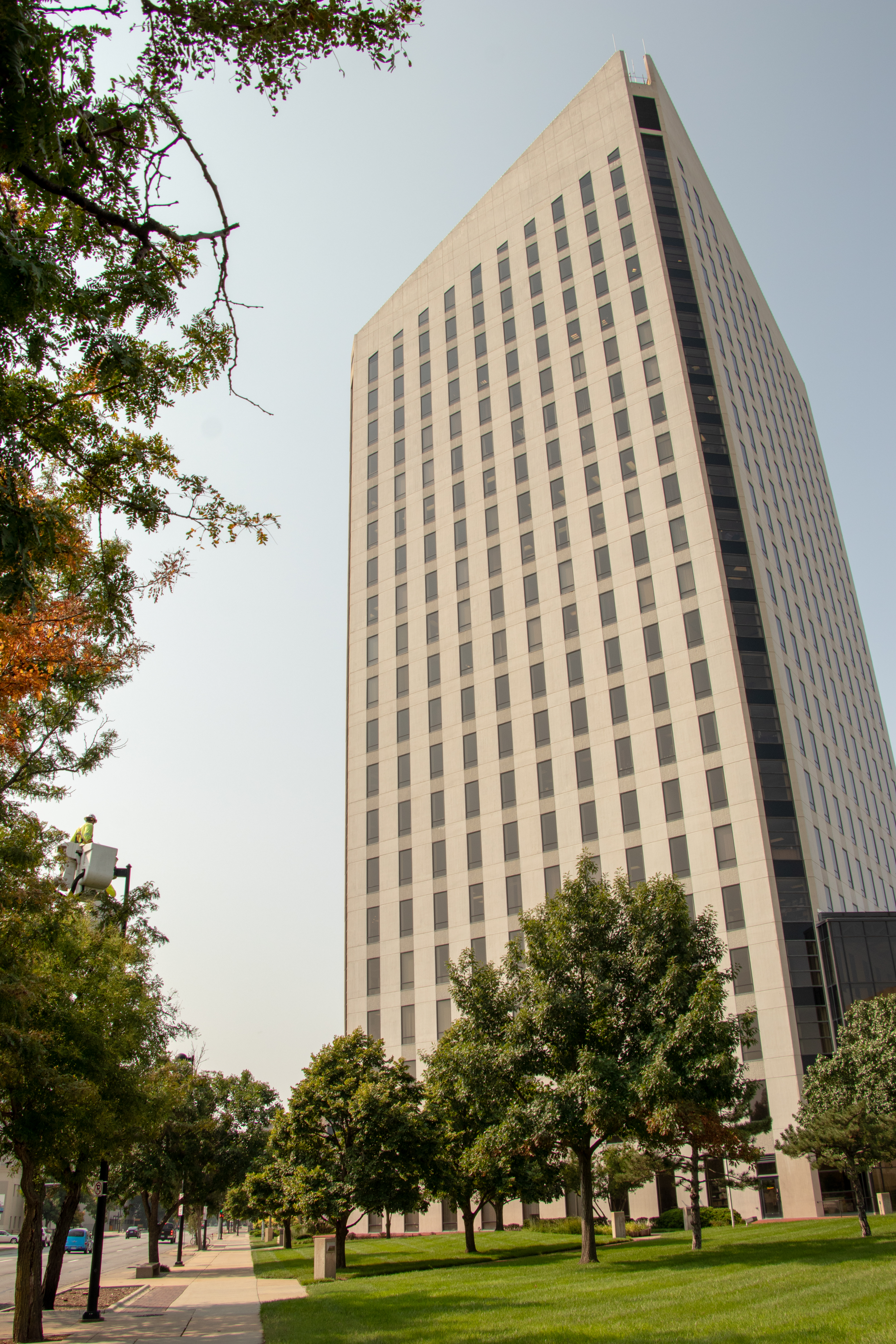
- The Epic Center in 2008

General information
- Status: Completed
- Type: Commercial office, TV transmission
- Location: 301 N. Main St., Wichita, Kansas, U.S.
- Coordinates: 37°41′25″N 97°20′19″W
- Construction started: 1985
- Completed: 1987
- Opening: 1987

Height
- Height: 320 feet (98 m)

Technical details
- Floor count: 22
- Floor area: 298,000 sq ft (27,700 m^{2})

Design and construction
- Architects: Platt, Adams, Braht, Bradley & Associates
- Main contractor: Dondlinger Construction

The Epic Center is a 320-foot (98 m), 22-story high-rise building at 301 N. Main St., Wichita, Kansas, United States. It is the tallest building in the state of Kansas, holding that title since its completion in 1987. Originally announced in 1982, the original design would have included two 20-story twin towers. The design was later changed to only have a single 22-story tower. Construction began in 1984 and was completed in 1987.

The Epic Center has 298,000 square feet (27,700 m^{2}) of office space. The tower includes 22 floors and is 320 feet (98 m) tall. The building was designed by Platt, Adams, Braht, Bradley & Associates and was built by Dondlinger Construction. It was built in the Modern architectural style. Fleeson Gooing Law Firm LLC, accounting firm Allen, Gibbs & Houlik LC and the North American headquarters of manufacturing firm Viega NA Inc. are its largest tenants.

== History ==
The Epic Center was announced in 1982 as one of two potential developments on a former city lot. Originally to include two 20-story twin towers, it was planned to be the tallest building in Kansas. By 1983, the development had picked and was changed from twin towers to four 10 story towers. This change was later reverted in 1984, with construction beginning the following year. Due to fear of low occupancy, the twin tower idea was cancelled again, leaving the South Tower the only one to be built. The building officially opened in 1987.

In 2007, in a $1.4 billion transaction the Epic Center, One and Two Brittany Place and 31 other buildings, were acquired by real estate investment firm Behringer Harvard, when it acquired IPC US REIT. In 2015, the Epic Center changed hands again, being purchased for $11.5 million by real estate investor Phil Ruffin. The building was sold again to Deutsche Bank in 2022.

== Design ==
The Epic Center has 298,000 square feet (27,700 m^{2}) of office space. The tower includes 22 floors and is 320 feet (98 m) tall. The building was designed by Platt, Adams, Braht, Bradley & Associates and was built by Dondlinger Construction. It was built in the Modern architectural style. Fleeson Gooing Law Firm LLC, accounting firm Allen, Gibbs & Houlik LC and the North American headquarters of manufacturing firm Viega NA Inc. are its largest tenants.

== See also ==
- List of tallest buildings in Wichita
- List of tallest buildings in Kansas
- List of tallest buildings by U.S. state
