= John M. Hickman =

Kansan architect

John M. Hickman (May 28, 1925 – April 23, 1964) was an architect in Wichita, Kansas. His work includes the Century II Performing Arts and Convention Center, Wichita State University's Ablah Library, and the Vickers Petroleum Service Station in Haysville, Kansas which was the first gas station to feature a futuristic "batwing" design. The gas station was added to the Kansas Register of Historic Places in August 2019 and the National Register of Historic Places in October 2019.

== Personal life ==
Born in Amarillo, Texas, Hickman moved with his family to Wichita. He served in the Army Air Corps. He worked as an illustrator for various aviation companies before becoming an architect. Hickman was an apprentice to Frank Lloyd Wright at the University of Illinois. His architectural partner was Roy K. Varenhorst. Hickman died by suicide/carbon monoxide poisoning on April 23, 1964, while working on Wichita's Century II project.

He was married and had four daughters.

== Legacy ==
Wichita State University has a collection of his papers.

== Work ==
- Vickers Petroleum Service Station (1954), NRHP listed
- Ablah Library (1962)
- Century II Performing Arts & Convention Center (1969)
- Woodman Elementary School
- Rea Woodman Elementary School
- 1531 Siefkin Street
- 1560 Fairfield Lane
- Riverview Country Club
- Tilford House
