= Vickers Petroleum =

Former oil company

Vickers Petroleum Company
- Industry: Oil
- Founded: 1918
- Founder: Jack A. Vickers, Sr.
- Defunct: 1980
- Fate: Sold to Total Petroleum, Mobil Oil and Petro-Lewis
- Headquarters: Wichita, Kansas
- Key people: Jack A. Vickers, Jr., president; Dick Boushka, president
- Products: Petroleum products

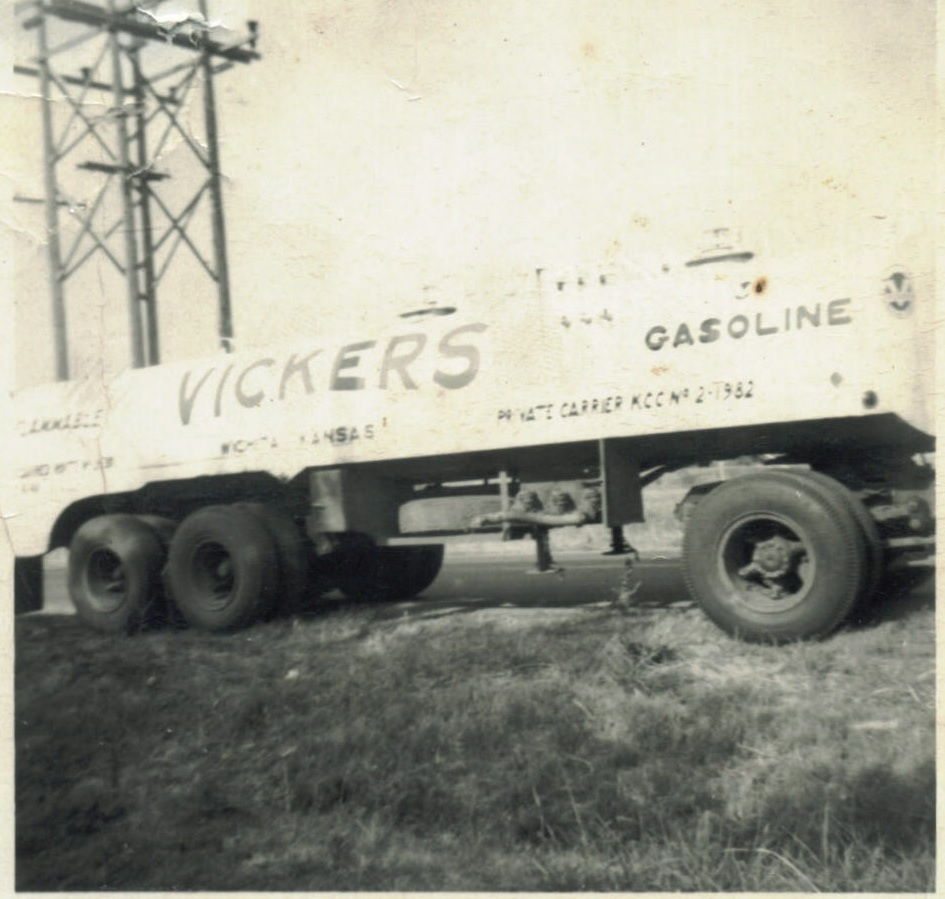
Vickers gasoline truck, c. 1954

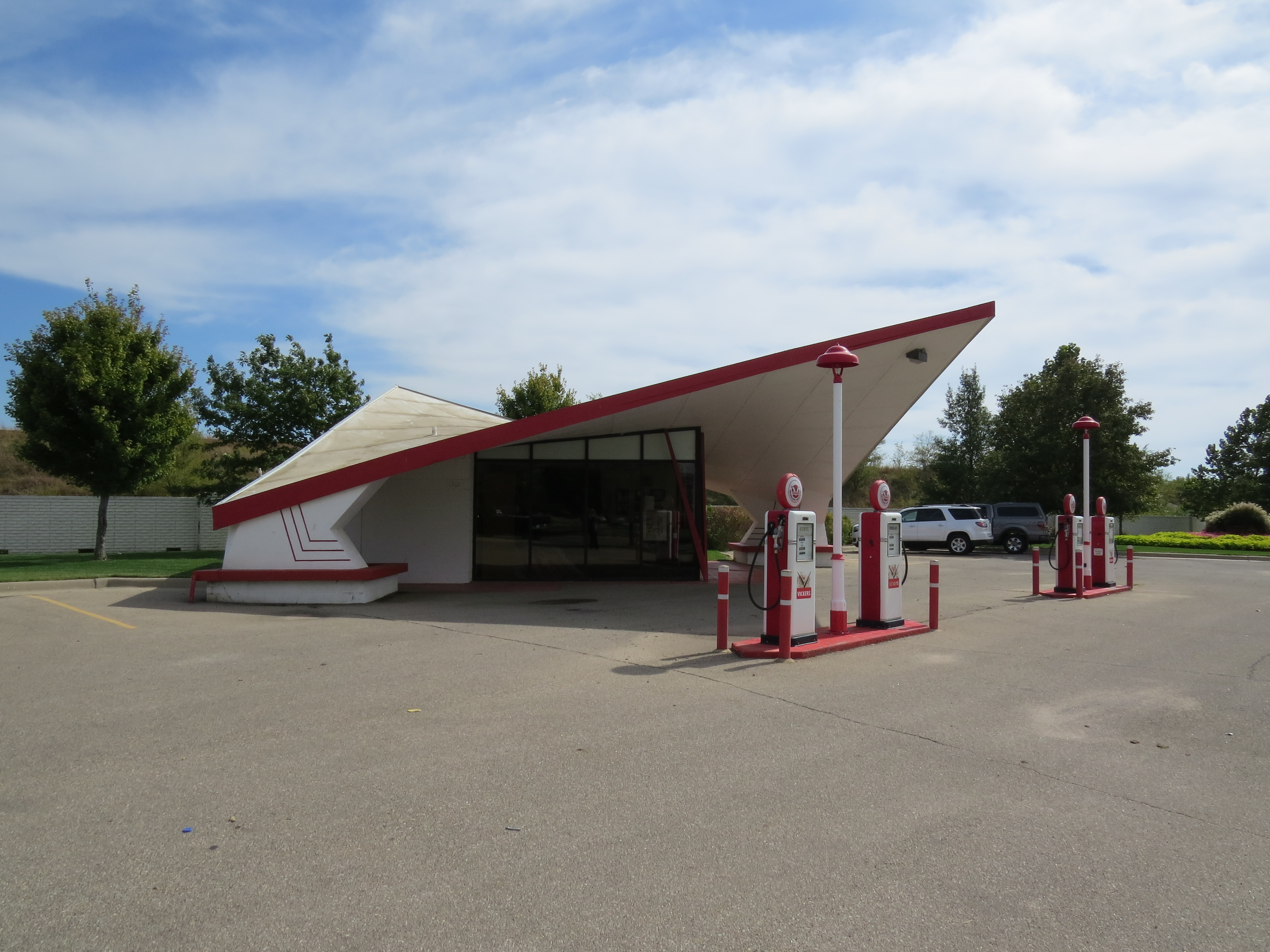
First Vickers service station built 1954 in Haysville, KS.

Vickers Petroleum Company was an oil company founded by John A. (Jack) Vickers, Sr. In 1918, Vickers established a refinery in Potwin, Kansas to process the output of recently discovered oil fields in Butler County.

== Wichita Vickers basketball ==
By the 1950s, Vickers had 300 employees, controlled a chain of 300 service stations in an area from Iowa to Colorado, and fielded the Wichita Vickers, an Amateur Athletic Union basketball team playing in the National Industrial Basketball League. The team was successful, winning a share of the 1957-58 league championship. Dick Boushka, a member of the United States basketball team in the 1956 Summer Olympics, was a standout player. Vickers discontinued its team sponsorship in 1960 due to competition with the NBA for players, but Boushka remained with the company and became president of Vickers Petroleum in 1963.

== Service stations ==
In the 1950s, Vickers built service stations with a hyperbolic paraboloid roof design. The only remaining building with this design is the Vickers Petroleum Service Station, built in 1954 in Haysville, Kansas. It was listed on the Kansas Historical Resource Inventory on August 3, 2019 and on the National Register of Historic Places on September 30, 2019.

== Purchase and breakup ==
In September 1968, Swift and Company announced its intention to buy Vickers and the related Bell Oil Company.

By March 1, 1969, the acquisition had been completed, and Jack Vickers, Jr., was made a director of Swift.

In 1973, Swift changed its name to Esmark and created a new subholding company, Vickers Energy Corporation.

Vickers Energy was broken up and sold in 1980. Total Petroleum (North America), Ltd. purchased the refining and marketing assets of Vickers Petroleum, including a refinery in Ardmore, Oklahoma, pipelines, and 350 service stations. Mobil Oil purchased oil and gas producing unit TransOcean Oil. Doric Petroleum, a natural gas processor, was sold to Petro-Lewis Corp. Total continued to use the Vickers name in marketing until 1993.

After the sale of the company, members of the Vickers family, including sons Jack, Jr., Robert, and Thomas, continued as civic and business leaders in both Colorado and Kansas.
