= Tyler Kahmann =

American gridiron football player (born 2000)

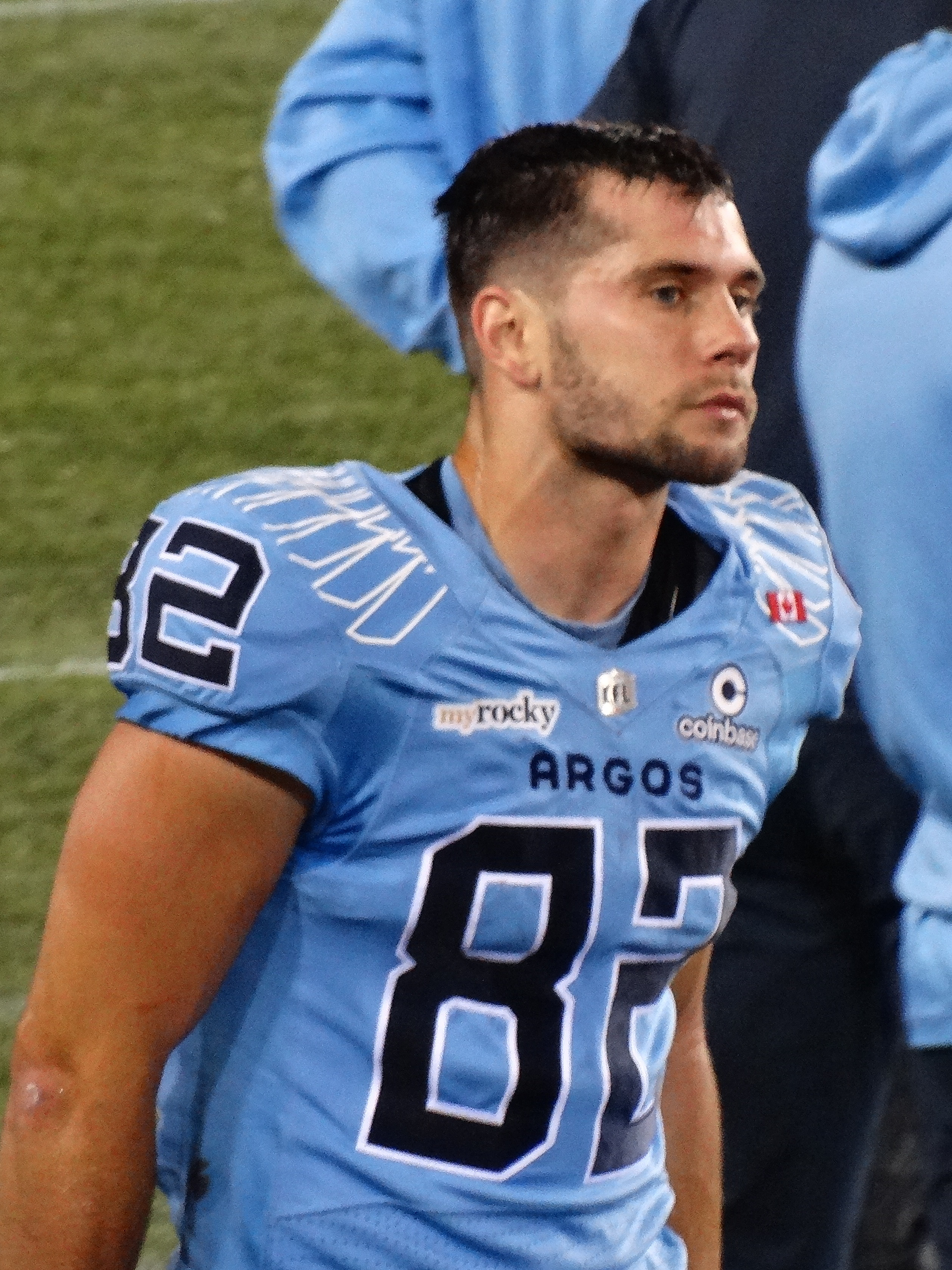
- Kahmann with the Toronto Argonauts in 2026

No. 82 – Toronto Argonauts
- Position: Wide receiver
- Roster status: Active
- CFL status: American

Personal information
- Born: October 15, 2000 (age 26); Haysville, Kansas, U.S.
- Listed height: 6 ft 3 in (1.91 m)
- Listed weight: 206 lb (93 kg)

Career information
- High school: Campus (Wichita, Kansas)
- College: Emporia State (2019–2024)
- NFL draft: 2025: undrafted

Career history
- Indianapolis Colts (2025)*; Toronto Argonauts (2025–present)
- * Offseason or practice squad member only

Awards and highlights
- CFL Most Outstanding Rookie (2026); 2× First-team All-MIAA (2023, 2024); AFCA First-team All-American (2024); AP First-team All-American (2024); AP Second-team All-American (2023)

Career CFL statistics as of 2026
- Receptions: 77
- Receiving yards: 1,092
- Receiving touchdowns: 8
- Stats at CFL.ca

Tyler Kahmann (born October 15, 2000) is an American professional football wide receiver for the Toronto Argonauts of the Canadian Football League (CFL). He played college football for the Emporia State Hornets.

== College career ==
Kahmann played college football for the Emporia State Hornets from 2019 to 2024. He was twice named a first-team All-Mid-America Intercollegiate Athletics Association recipient doing so in 2023 and unanimously in 2024. Kahmann finished his career as a two-time All-American, earning both in his final two seasons.

In his four playing seasons, he made 282 catches for 3,686 yards and 54 touchdowns, which includes 20 scores in 2023 and 2024. Kahmann holds school records for almost every receiving record, career, single-season, and single-game. (Note: The only record Kahmann does not hold is the single-game receptions record.)

== Professional career ==
Pre-draft measurables
Height	Weight	Arm length	Hand span	Wingspan	40-yard dash	10-yard split	20-yard split	20-yard shuttle	Three-cone drill	Vertical jump	Broad jump	Bench press
6 ft 1 1/2 in (1.87 m)	207 lb (94 kg)	30 1/8 in (0.77 m)	8 7/8 in (0.23 m)	6 ft 1 3/8 in (1.86 m)	4.51 s	1.60 s	2.62 s	4.33 s	7.09 s	35.5 in (0.90 m)	10 ft 2 in (3.10 m)	9 reps
All values from Pro Day

=== Indianapolis Colts ===
After going undrafted in the 2025 NFL draft, Kahmann signed with the Indianapolis Colts of the National Football League (NFL) as an undrafted free agent. He was released by the team on August 26, 2025. Kahmann was signed to the practice squad on August 27, before he was released the following day.

=== Toronto Argonauts ===
On September 15, 2025, Kahmann was signed by the Toronto Argonauts of the Canadian Football League (CFL) to the practice roster. He was released on October 28, 2025 and was then re-signed on January 2, 2026. Kahmann was signed to practice roster on May 31, 2026.

On June 11, 2026, he was elevated to the active roster and made his CFL debut against the Montreal Alouettes. He recorded six catches for 106 yards and his first touchdown. On October 30, Kahman was named the CFL Most Outstanding Rookie for the 2026 season.

== Career statistics ==
Legend
**Bold**	Career high

=== College ===
Year	Team	Games	Receiving			
Year	Team	GP	Rec	Yds	Avg	TD
2019	Emporia State	0	0	0	—	0
2020	Emporia State	0	0	0	—	0
2021	Emporia State	**12**	34	428	12.6	5
2022	Emporia State	**12**	47	536	11.4	9
2023	Emporia State	**12**	**101**	1,234	12.2	**20**
2024	Emporia State	11	100	**1,488**	**14.9**	**20**
Career		47	282	3,686	13.1	54
