= Edward J. Adams =

American spree killer (1887–1921)

Eddie Adams
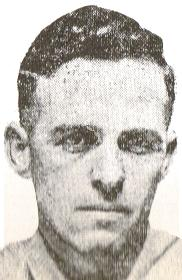
- Mugshot of Adams, 1921
- Born: William Joseph Wallace; April 23, 1887; Hutchinson, Kansas, U.S.
- Died: November 22, 1921 (aged 34); Wichita, Kansas, U.S.
- Cause of death: Gunshot wounds
- Convictions: Bank robbery; Murder
- Penalty: Life imprisonment

Details
- Victims: 7
- Span of crimes: 1920–1921
- Country: United States
- States: Kansas; Missouri

Edward James Adams (April 23, 1887 – November 22, 1921) was an American criminal and spree killer in the Midwest. He murdered seven people—including three policemen—over a period of around 14 months and wounded at least a dozen others. At age 34, Adams was surrounded and then killed by police in Wichita, Kansas.

== Early life ==
Edward James "Eddie" Adams was born in 1887 on a farm in Hutchinson, Kansas, as William Joseph Wallace. His father died when he was young, and his mother remarried. He had a strong disdain for his stepfather, as well as for physical labor. He learned the barber trade and moved to Wichita in the early 20th century. There, he met John Callahan and quickly became involved in bootlegging, petty robberies, and car theft.

Adams was handsome and charismatic, and he attracted many women and hangers-on. His wife left him after growing weary of his illegal activities and infidelities.

He soon formed his gang and began committing bank and train robberies throughout Kansas, Missouri, and Iowa, eventually earning a reputation as the premier bandit in the Midwest by the early days of Prohibition.

== Murder and Kansas City ==
In 1920, through Callahan, Adams formed a partnership with outlaw brothers Ray and Walter Majors and, on September 5, attempted a daylight robbery against a notorious Kansas City gambling den on Grand Avenue owned by Harry Trusdell. However, a shootout between the bandits and tough employees of the illegal casino resulted in the death of gambler and gunman Frank Gardner and the eventual capture of the gang by police.

Adams was sentenced to life imprisonment in February 1921. The Majors brothers received lesser sentences by agreeing to plead guilty to robbery and were both sentenced to five years' imprisonment. Both brothers eventually died in prison. A third Majors brother involved in the botched robbery attempt, Dudley, escaped from the scene, only to be later arrested and serve time in Delaware.

== Midwest crime spree ==
While being transported to the Missouri State Penitentiary in Jefferson City, Missouri, Adams escaped custody by jumping off the train and, several days later, joined Julius Finney in the robbery of a bank and general store in Cullison, Kansas, on February 11, 1921. He was captured on February 17, 1921, near Garden Plain, Kansas, by a posse after wrecking a stolen car under a bridge. Convicted of bank robbery, Adams was sentenced to serve 10 to 30 years at the Kansas State Penitentiary in Lansing, in addition to his life sentence in Missouri for murder.

On August 13, Adams once again successfully escaped imprisonment after sabotaging the prison power plant and scaling the prison walls during the night, along with inmates Frank Foster, George Weisberger, and D.C. Brown. The driver of the getaway car was Billy Fintelman, a World War I veteran who had turned to a life of crime. With the exception of Brown (who was recaptured days later), the fugitives eluded capture from state authorities and eventually formed what became the newest incarnation of the Adams gang.

By September of that year, joined by Fintelman, the gang robbed around $10,000 from banks in Rose Hill and Haysville, Kansas. During the Haysville robbery, Adams pistol-whipped 82-year-old James Krievell for no apparent reason, who later died of a fractured skull.

On October 8, police attempted to trap the gang near Anoly, Kansas, but the gang managed to escape after a gunfight that left Deputy Benjamin Fisher wounded. The gang was spotted 11 days later after stealing $500 in silver from a bank near Osceola, Iowa. This was followed by another attempt by a posse to apprehend the gang just south of Murray, Iowa, where the gang rested for several hours along a gravel road just a few miles from town. Having spotted the gang's vehicle, suspicious farmer Charles William Jones (1870–1921) contacted Murray Sheriff Ed West, and a group was formed to investigate and intervene.

Upon approaching the vehicle, Sheriff West was met at point-blank range with a revolver to his face that failed to fire. He was able to take cover, and a shootout followed in which several members of the posse were seriously injured. Jones, having heard the gun battle from his farm up the road, grabbed his shotgun and ran to aid Sheriff West and his group. The gang, which had by now fled from the original site, drove up the road and exchanged fire with Jones, which left him mortally wounded.

Heading for Wichita, the gang's crime spree continued—robbing 11 stores in Muscotah, Kansas, and abducting and later robbing two motorcycle officers outside Wichita, where their motorcycles were set on fire. Back in Wichita, on November 5, 1921, Adams shot and killed Patrolman A.L. Young in cold blood while Young was on duty. The motive behind the killing was said to be a mutual love interest, who had chosen the company of the officer over the outlaw. The gang then committed their most successful robbery with the theft of $35,000 after robbing a Santa Fe express train near Ottawa, Kansas.

== Death ==
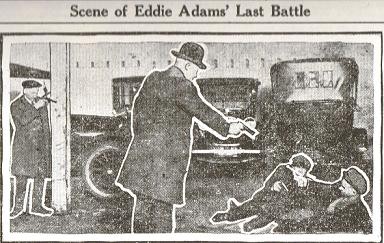
A re-enactment of Adam's fatal shootout with the police, as published in the Wichita Eagle, November 23, 1921.

On the evening of November 20, 1921, Adams, along with Foster, Nellie Miles (a local madam and long-time friend of Adams), George J. McFarland (a local thug and bootlegger), and two alleged prostitutes, were joyriding around Wichita. Another car carrying Fintelman, his wife, Weisberger, P.D. Orcutt, and two unnamed ladies, followed at high speeds. Two motorcycle policemen pulled over the vehicle carrying Adams, and a gunshot came from the vehicle; whether the shot was fired by Adams or Foster is unknown, but it killed patrolman Robert Fitzpatrick. The outlaws sped away, released the women, and fled south into Cowley County.

Later that night, the trio ran out of gas and stopped at a farm, where Adams attempted to steal a vehicle from farmer George Oldham. When Oldham resisted, Adams shot and killed him. Adams and Foster took the car, while McFarland ran away alone into the night. The duo returned to Wichita in the stolen car. The next day, Adams and Billy Fintelman went to McFarland's house to look for him, only to find two officers waiting. Adams shot and wounded officer Ray Casner, while the other policeman hid under a bed. Adams once again escaped.

Adams hid out until the funeral of Officer Fitzpatrick on November 22, at which he assumed the bulk of the police force would be present. He had planned to rent a car to leave town for good, but the proprietor of the garage recognized him and contacted police. Three officers arrived on the scene. Adams shot at them, fatally wounding detective Charles Hoffman, who had pulled Adams to the ground. Officer Charles Bowman was also hit by gunfire. D.C. Stuckey, hiding behind a pillar, shot Adams three times and killed him.

Eddie Adams' body was publicly displayed in the City Undertaking Parlor in a grisly celebration of the end of a reign of terror. More than 9,000 people viewed the slain outlaw. In the end, 18 people were arrested as accomplices and hangers-on of Adams. Four were sent to the Kansas State Penitentiary, including Frank Foster, who was sentenced to remain there for life.

== See also ==
- List of Depression-era outlaws
- List of serial killers in the United States

== Books ==
- Newton, Michael. Encyclopedia of Robbers, Heists, and Capers. New York: Facts On File Inc., 2002.
- Wellman, Paul. A Dynasty of Western Outlaws. New York: Bonanza Books, 1961.
- The Wichita Eagle Beacon. The First One Hundred Years. Wichita: Eagle Beacon Publishing Co., 1972, page 49.
