= Sprint International =

Sprint International may refer to:

- Sprint Corporation, telecommunications company
- The International (golf), golf tournament
