= John Callahan (outlaw) =

Old West outlaw

- Callahan's 1911 Leavenworth mugshot
- Born: 1866
- Died: June 9, 1936 (aged 70); Wichita, Kansas
- Occupations: Outlaw, bank robber and underworld figure
- Spouses: Rosa E. Hicks (died); Daisy E. Hicks (m. 1909; died 1910); Nellie Callahan (m. 1920)
- Status: Released after serving 7 years
- Convictions: Burglary, larceny, bank robbery, receiving stolen property, bootlegging, narcotics trafficking
- Penalty: 25 years imprisonment

John Callahan (1866 – June 8, 1936) was an American outlaw prominent during the closing days of the Old West and early days of Prohibition, eventually becoming the leading underworld figure in Wichita, Kansas and a pioneer of American organized crime.

He began his career as a bank robber and soon became one of the best-known fences for stolen property, cash, and securities in the Midwest, before engaging in the bootlegging of alcohol and trafficking of narcotics. His partnership with corrupt officials in the Wichita Police Department allowed the city to become a haven for criminals, much like St. Paul, Minnesota during the 1930s, and served as a mentor to many future outlaws of the "Public Enemy" Era such as Eddie Adams and Pretty Boy Floyd.

Tall, portly, and "a smooth talker with a hint of Irish brogue on his tongue," Callahan could be equal parts charming and brutish, noted for intelligence unusual for criminals of his class, as well as his habit of assaulting photographers attempting to capture his mugshot or images of his house. His "easy smile, coolness under pressure and supposed adherence to the criminal code of honor" were often noted.

== Early criminal career ==
=== "King of the Yeggmen" ===
Although details of Callahan's early life are unknown, his first run-in with Sedgwick County authorities came after robbing the State Bank of Clearwater in the early morning hours of November 25, 1899. Callahan and two accomplices blasted into a large iron safe, the modus operandi of so-called "yeggmen," with enough nitroglycerin to bulge the building's walls and blow out its windows. Mistakenly believing Clearwater to be in Sumner County rather than Sedgwick County, the gang escaped to Wichita on a handcar with $127 in cash and nearly $8,000 in bonds and commercial notes. Callahan was arrested later that afternoon while asleep inside a saloon where he had been conspicuously purchasing drinks with cent pieces after the bank was robbed of $4 worth of pennies. Callahan rejected a plea deal of two-and-a-half years offered by County Attorney Samuel B. Amidon, was found guilty, and sentenced to a term of six years in the Lansing State Penitentiary for burglary and larceny.

Mugshot of John Callahan, received at Lansing State Prison in 1900 for burglary and larceny.

Paroled by Governor W.E. Stanley in December 1902, it took just four months for Callahan to find himself back in state prison finishing his original sentence after being arrested for the robbery of the Stockman State Bank in Greensburg.

The first indication of Callahan's noted cleverness came in December 1904, when he filed his own motion that the Lansing prison warden had no right to cancel the "good time" the prisoner accrued prior to his parole. The judge agreed over the objections of Kansas Attorney General C.C. Coleman, with a reporter noting that Callahan "made a very creditable argument" and "seems to have a fair knowledge of law." He was subsequently released in January 1905.

== Criminal boss ==
By 1909, Callahan was described as "one of the worst criminals now operating in the west" by a Pinkerton detective, publicly known as having "been the head of a gang of crooks in Wichita for years." His influence over the Wichita Police Department was fully established, with officers making no attempt to investigate or halt his criminal activity, so long as the crimes were committed outside city limits.

=== Callahan's Dump ===
Photographers were punched and attacked by Callahan's bull terrier Frankie for attempting to document Callahan's Dump.

By the late 1900s, Callahan had firmly established his base of operations out of a compound at 233 N. Mosley in Wichita known as "Callahan's Dump." The nickname not only indicated its proximity to an adjacent junkyard but also its role as a convenient front for "every kind of devious lawless enterprise," especially the purchase and trafficking of stolen property. A weatherbeaten two-story house served as a headquarters for Callahan's gang and a hideout for all manner of criminal hangers-on, while Callahan and his family lived in a more modest one-story structure next door.

The property was guarded around the clock by Callahan's henchmen, who would threaten and assault anyone coming to photograph or otherwise document the Dump. Otherwise, it was frequented by a diverse clientele of "rich and poor, desperadoes and petty thieves, citizens with thirsts and others with things they wanted 'fixed.'"

The Dump would continue to serve as a nuisance to the community even after Callahan landed in federal prison in 1911, devolving into a "convivial meeting place for dope fiends, both black and white." Maintained by a colored woman named Liza Logan who previously served as Callahan's personal cook, the property was frequently raided and cleared of vagrants, drunks, and addicts by the new, overhauled police regime. Declaring the place "in vile condition and unsanitary," in February 1912 city officials dumped a gallon of kerosene through the building and burned it to the ground.

== Later life and death ==
Following his final release from prison, Callahan lived a quiet and retired existence in Wichita, owing to his age and gunshot-related injuries. He died in his sleep on June 8, 1936 of a kidney condition at the age of 70, and was buried in an unmarked grave next to his wife Rosa in Wichita's Maple Grove Cemetery.
