= PGA Tour Lifetime Achievement Award =

Created in 1996, the PGA Tour Lifetime Achievement Award honors individuals who have made an outstanding contribution to the PGA Tour over an extended period of time through their actions on and off the golf course.

As of 2025, there have been 14 recipients of the award:

Year	Recipients	Country
2025	Tim Finchem	United States
2015	Dick Ebersol	United States
2015	Ken Schanzer	United States
2014	Jack Vickers	United States
2012	Gary Player	South Africa
2009	George H. W. Bush	United States
2008	Jack Nicklaus	United States
2007	Deane Beman	United States
2005	Pete Dye	United States
2003	Jack Burke Jr.	United States
1998	Arnold Palmer	United States
1998	Sam Snead	United States
1997	Byron Nelson	United States
1996	Gene Sarazen	United States

== See also ==
- List of golf awards § PGA Tour
