= Amidon House =

Historic house in Kansas, United States

The Amidon House
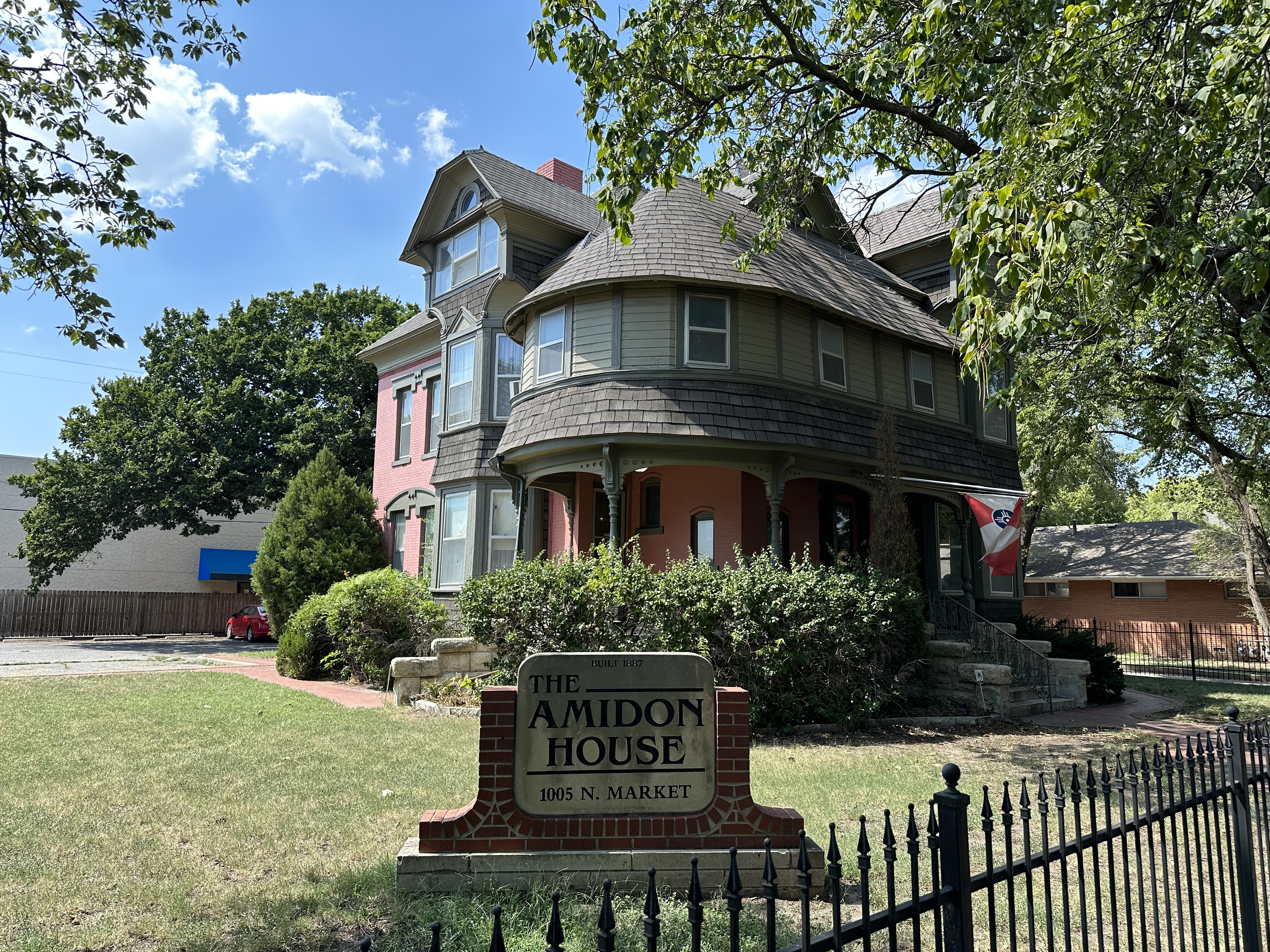
- The house in August 2023

General information
- Architectural style: Queen Anne
- Location: 1005 N. Market, Wichita, Kansas
- Coordinates: 37°42′2″N 97°20′14″W
- Named for: Samuel B. Amidon
- Completed: 1887

Technical details
- Floor count: 3
- Floor area: 3,430 sq ft (319 m^{2})

Design and construction
- Architecture firm: Gould & Terry
- Designations: Historic Landmark, City of Wichita

The Amidon House (historically known as the Garver-Amidon House) is a Queen Anne-style Victorian mansion in the historic Midtown neighborhood of Wichita, Kansas. Built in 1887 by financier Martin L. Garver, it became particularly notable as the residence of prominent Wichitan Samuel B. Amidon from 1896 to 1925, during his tenure as Sedgwick County Attorney and later as Vice Chair of the Democratic National Committee.

Converted to a rooming house to serve workers in Wichita's booming aircraft industry during World War II, the house changed hands multiple times over the next three decades until age and neglect sparked fears of dilapidation. With this in mind, the building was rezoned for commercial use in the 1970s, and the renovated house has since served as office space for various firms, practices, and consultants. It was registered as a Historic Landmark by the City of Wichita in 1977.

== History ==
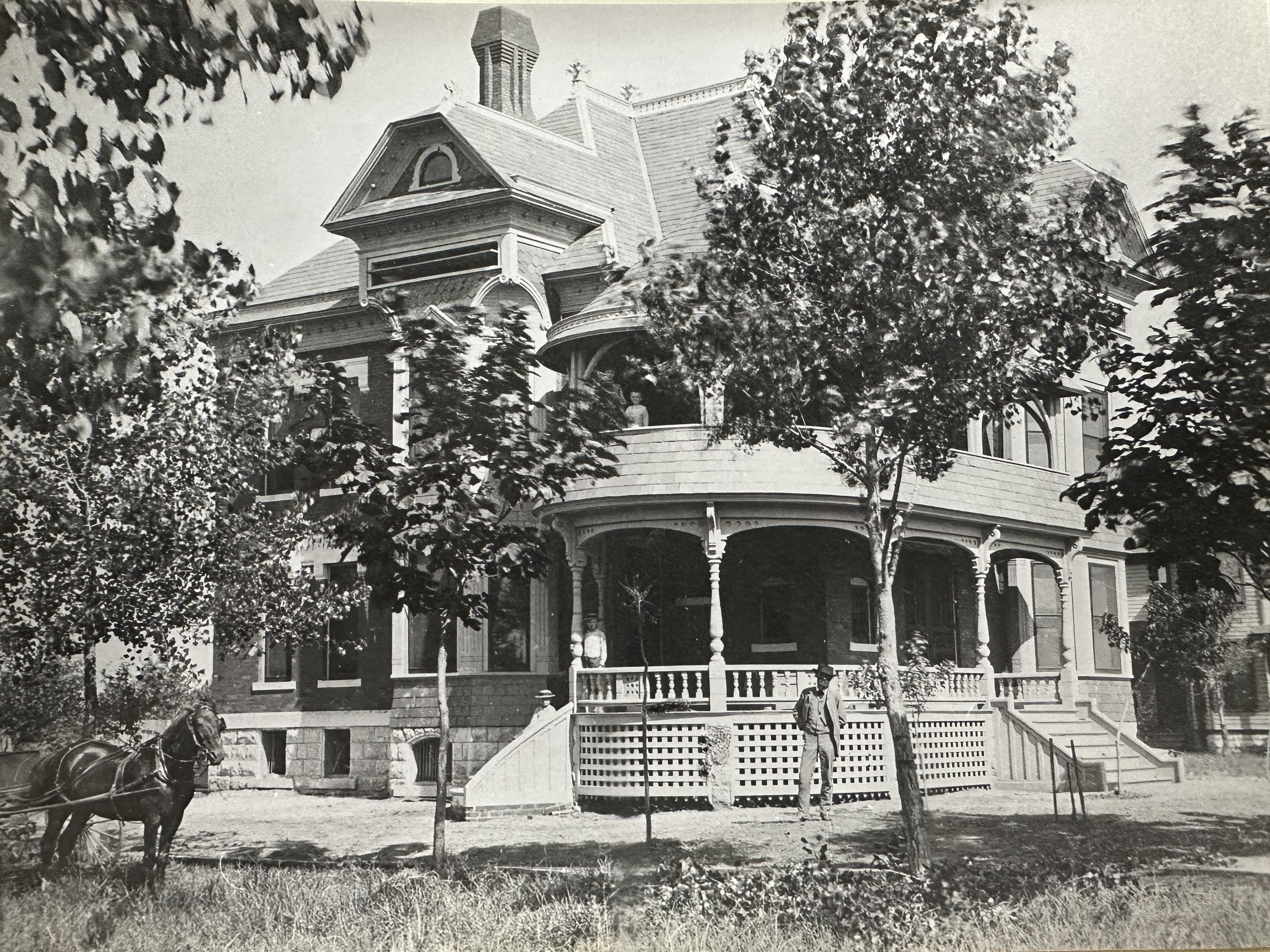
The Garver family, including their horse Colonel, pose with the newly completed house, 1887.

Designed by the Wichita architectural firm of Gould & Terry, the mansion finished construction in 1887 at an estimated cost of $10,000 (or $323,000 in 2023 dollars). Located on the northwest corner of Market and Park (now 9th) Streets, the home was commissioned on a .37 acre plot of land originally purchased in 1883.

=== The Garver Family ===
The home's builders and original occupants, the Garver family was headed by prominent builder and financier Martin Luther (M.L.) Garver and his wife, Kathryn ("Kate") B. Emminger. They lived in the home with their four children Mary, George, James, and Charles from its completion in 1887 until 1896, when the family moved to 1231 N. Waco.

Mr. Garver was born near Scotland, Pennsylvania on May 16, 1844, and raised on his family farm. He served briefly in the Union Army during the American Civil War as a member of Company A of the 26th Pennsylvania Infantry Regiment before being discharged in 1863. After graduating from Wittenberg College in 1866, he married Kate Emminger of Mansfield, Ohio on April 11, 1871. After going into the real estate and loan business, Martin relocated the family to Wichita in 1879, where earlier in the decade he had "camped just south of where the Second Street bridge [was once] located, and bought Buffalo steak at 25 cents a basket."

=== Samuel B. Amidon ===
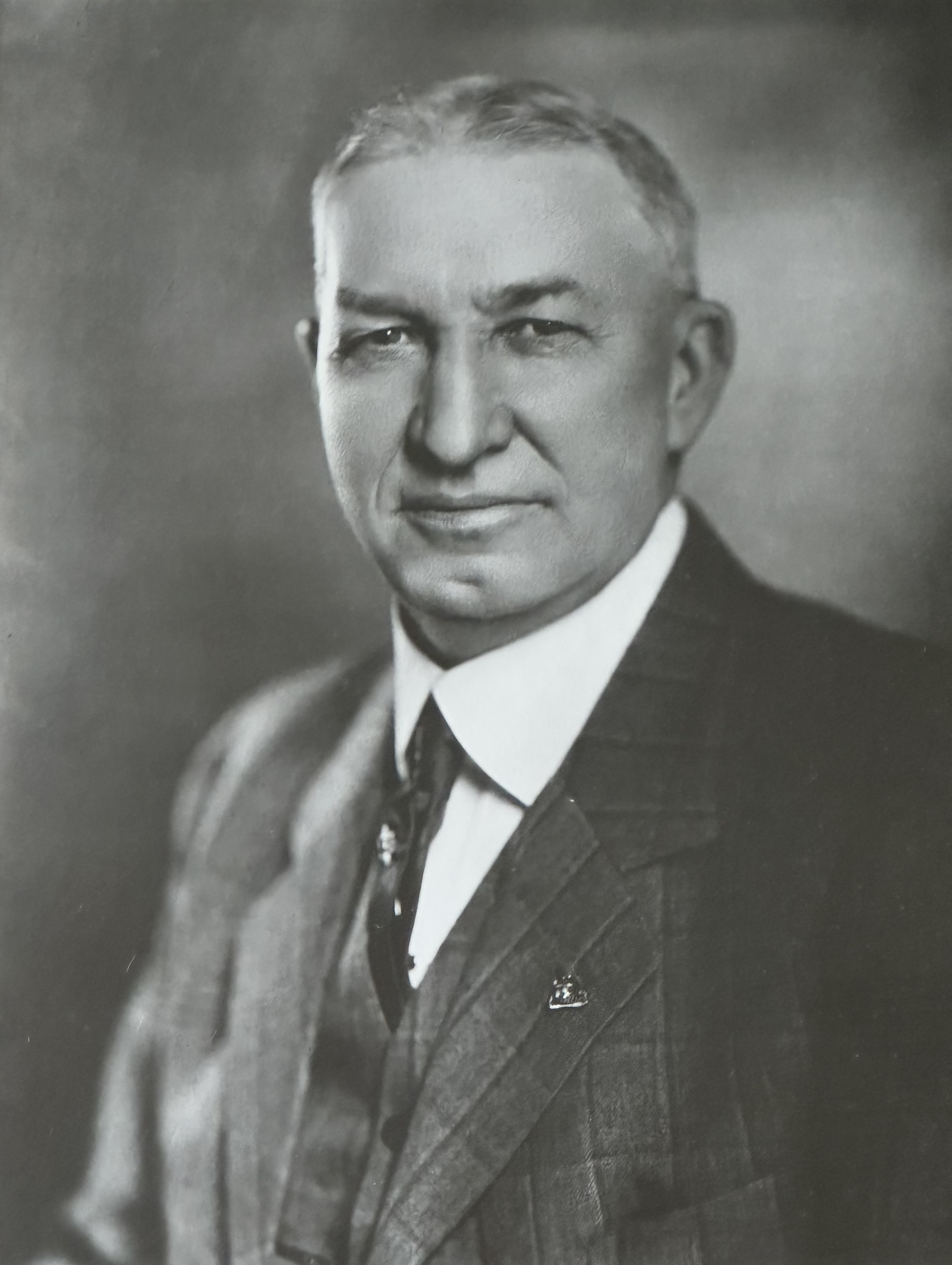
Amidon during his tenure as DNC Vice Chair, 1919–1925.

On January 26, 1896, Garver listed the house for sale in the Wichita Eagle, offering "my splendid brick, slate-roof, 10-room house... at 33 per cent of cost if sold at once. The chance of your lifetime." Why Garver was intent on quickly selling his custom-built mansion at a third of its construction price is unclear, although economic turbulence in the wake of the Panic of 1893 likely had a temporary impact on the outlook of his real estate business.

Regardless, one month later on February 27, the Eagle was reporting that Samuel B. Amidon had "purchased the fine home of M.L. Garver." The newspaper went on to state that "when Sam and Mrs. Amidon get through furnishing it in accordance with their plans it will be one of the most comfortable homes in the city," noting that the Amidons had outmaneuvered several prominent citizens of Wichita who also wanted to purchase the property.

Born and raised in Perry, Ohio, Amidon graduated from Cleveland Law School and relocated to Wichita in 1886. By the time of his purchase of the Garver home 10 years later, he had grown wealthy and respected through his successful legal practice, effective speaking skills, and warm personality. Later in 1896, Amidon would go on to win election as Sedgwick County Attorney, a position he was reelected to in 1898 "by a larger majority than was ever before received by a Sedgwick County Attorney" to that point.

After retiring from public office in 1901, Amidon established a legal partnership with Judge David M. Dale. The firm of Dale & Amidon would grow to become "one of the most prominent and influential in the state" and "[appear] in connection with the most important litigations in the state and federal courts." In addition to his legal practice, Amidon spent time growing his influence in the state and national Democratic Party. These efforts eventually culminated in his selection as Kansas' representative to the Democratic National Committee, a close personal friendship with President Woodrow Wilson, and his eventual election as Vice Chair of the DNC.

Amidon's free time was spent collecting prize horses and cars, traveling the world, and funding various charitable efforts for the poor that further bolstered his reputation in the Wichita community. After suffering a heart attack in his office on May 8, 1925, Amidon died at the age of 62. His widow Alice moved to San Diego, California in 1928 to live with her sister, but retained ownership of the home and visited occasionally until dying in 1936.

=== Rooming house ===
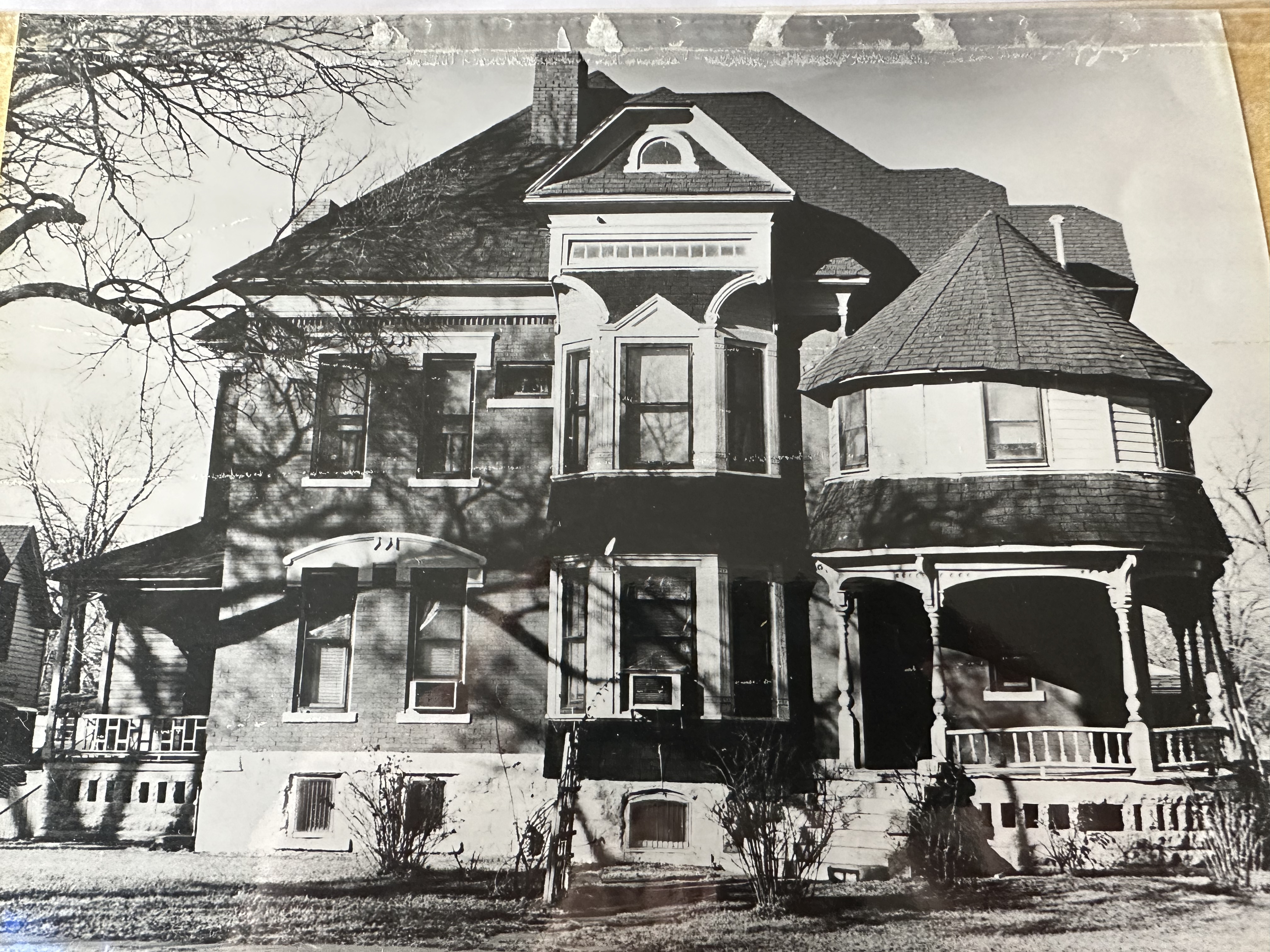
A view of the house's south face around 1945. The second story porch was enclosed to maximize rentable space during World War II.

Around 1947, the home was purchased by Lyda E. Barnes. A 59-year-old widow active as a leader in female fraternal orders like the Rebekah Lodge and Hypatia Club, Barnes continued operating it as a rooming house along with several other owned rental properties. As of the 1950 census, she lived in the home while renting rooms to five individuals and two married couples.
