= Campus High School =

Location
- 2100 West 55th Street South; Wichita, Kansas 67217; United States; 37.594594°N 97.367562°W

Information
- School type: Public, high school
- Established: 1960
- School district: Haysville USD 261
- CEEB code: 173168
- Principal: Shane Seeley
- Teaching staff: 94.40 (FTE)
- Grades: 9 to 12
- Gender: Co-ed
- Enrollment: 1,833 (2023–2024)
- Student to teacher ratio: 19.42
- Campus type: Suburban
- Colors: Black; White; Gold
- Athletics: Class 6A
- Athletics conference: Ark Valley Chisholm Trail League Division I
- Mascot: Colts
- Rival: Derby High School
- Accreditation: Blue Ribbon 2013
- Communities served: Haysville
- Website: chs.usd261.com

Campus High School is a public high school in Wichita, Kansas, serving students in grades 9–12. Despite being located within the Wichita city limits, Campus is part of Haysville USD 261. The school colors are black and white with an accent of gold. The current enrollment is 1,742 students.

Campus High School is a member of the Kansas State High School Activities Association and offers a variety of sports programs. Athletic teams compete in the 6A division and are known as the "Colts". Extracurricular activities are also offered in the form of performing arts, school publications, and clubs.

The school layout features a college "campus" type courtyard with sidewalks going to each end of the building, and a clock-tower with a bell underneath. It also has numerous sports fields north of the building, and a nearby lake which is used for science classes.

== History ==
=== Early years ===
Campus High School was established in 1960 with the name, Rural High School District 191. At the time, it served several communities including Oatville, South Riverside, and Enterprise. The name "Campus" was chosen by the students who were to attend the new high school. The following year, the Wichita district annexed part of the high school, reducing the student population by nearly half and causing large public sentiment. The annexed buildings would remain empty from 1961 until Freeman Elementary School was relocated to the site in 1966. Campus has had four additions to the original facility in the past 40 years.

=== Recent years ===
The school underwent renovation to turn it into a single building. The renovation includes a new, larger cafeteria, a new library, and new offices, as well as renovations on all of the other buildings except "J", now renamed "F" building, the science building. The renovation was completed before the 2008–09 school year. The courtyard, media center, and theatre were all completed in December 2008.

== Academics ==
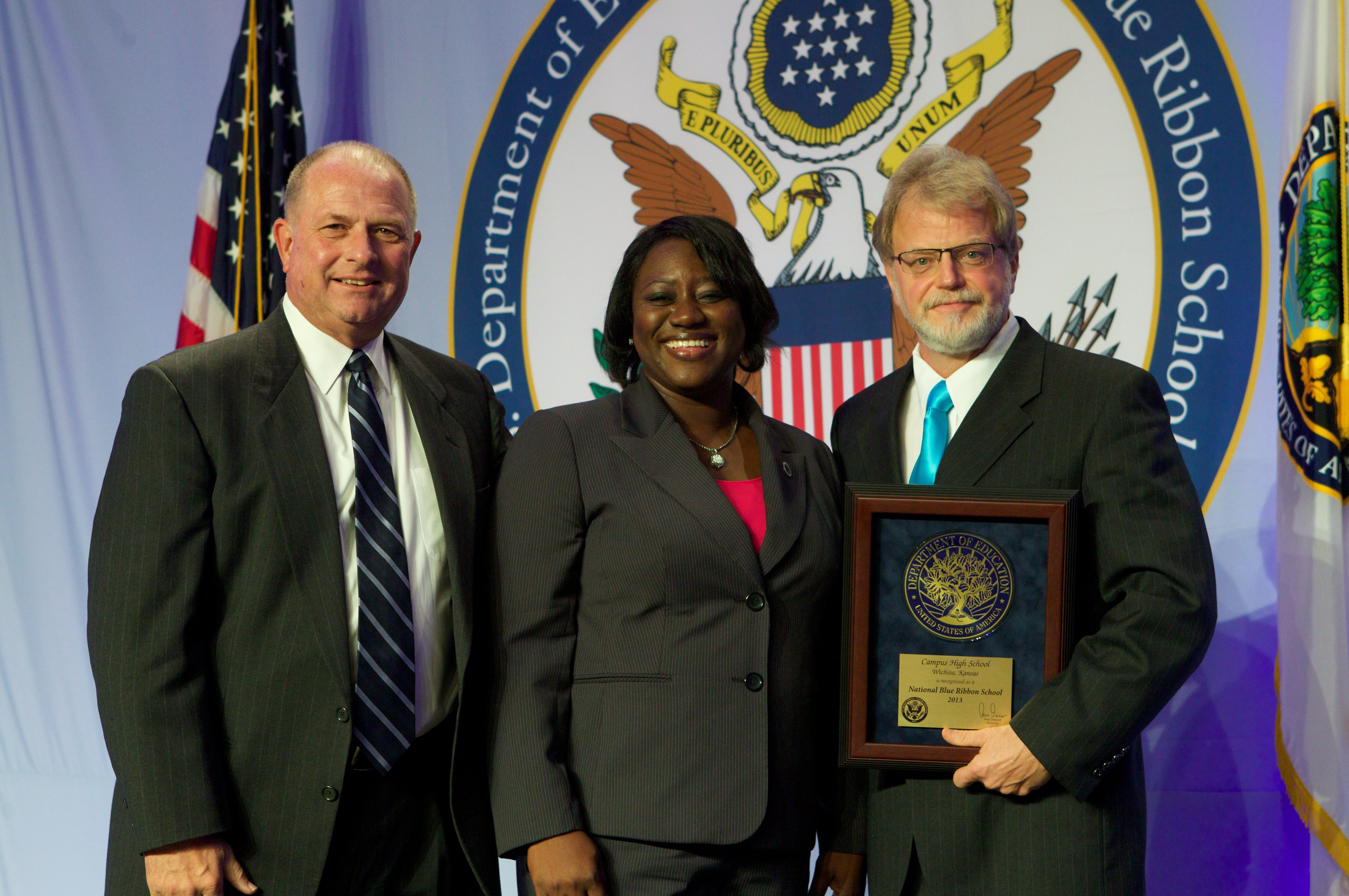
2013 National Blue Ribbon Schools winner

In 2013, Campus High School was selected as a National Blue Ribbon Schools. The Blue Ribbon Award recognizes public and private schools which perform at high levels or have made significant academic improvements. The school is also an authorized International Baccalaureate School.

== Extracurricular activities ==
=== Non-athletic programs ===
==== Theatre ====
Campus calls their theatre department Campus Mane Stage Theatre ("Mane" being like the colt's mane). Campus theatre is a part of the International Thespian Society and is troupe #537. Because of this, the troupe members go to Kansas State Thespian Conference once every year in January. Honors include many Gold Honor Troupe 2004, 2006, 2008, 2009, 2010, 2012, 2013 and 2014; Silver Honor Troupe 2005, 2007 and 2011; and Bronze Honor Troupe 2003. The theatre department also has an improv troupe, Mane Stage Maniacs. Productions take place in the Campus High School auditorium which seats over 700 people. Campus High School enters into the Music Theatre of Wichita Jester Awards, which honors Wichita area high schools for the quality of their musicals.

==== Band ====
The marching band is one of 10% in the nation that does different halftime shows at the school's football games. As of September 12, 2016, the Campus High Band has received a 1 rating for the 15th year in a row at the Kansas State Fair.

== Athletics ==
The Colts compete in the Ark Valley Chisholm Trail League and are classified as a 6A school, the largest classification in Kansas according to the Kansas State High School Activities Association.

=== Varsity sports ===
==== Fall ====
- Football
- Volleyball
- Cross Country (boys and girls)
- Boys Soccer
- Girls Tennis

==== Winter ====
- Basketball (boys and girls)
- Wrestling
- Bowling (boys and girls)
- Swimming/diving (boys)

==== Spring ====
- Baseball
- Boys Golf
- Boys Tennis
- Girls Soccer
- Girls Swimming/Diving
- Softball
- Track and Field (boys and girls)

=== State championships ===
State Championships
Season	Sport	Number	Year
Winter	Girls Bowling	7	2015, 2016, 2018, 2019, 2020, 2021, 2024
Winter	Boys Bowling	1	2019
Spring	Boys Track & Field	1	1990
Spring	Baseball	2	1991, 2019
Total		11	

== Notable alumni ==
- Tyler Kahmann, professional football player

== See also ==
- Education in Kansas
- List of high schools in Kansas
- List of unified school districts in Kansas
