= Norland Plastics =

- Industry: Injection Molded Automotive Parts
- Founded: 1978; 48 years ago
- Headquarters: Haysville, Kansas, United States
- Parent: Teleflex, Inc.

Norland Plastics is a plastic modling business located in Haysville, Kansas, United States. Norland Plastics is located at 117 Baughman Ave. Norland makes quality automotive injection molded parts for Ford, Nissan, GM.

== History ==
It was founded in 1976 by Charles Landwehr, who is still the company's president,

Norland Plastics was purchased in 1995 by Teleflex Inc (headquartered in Limerick, PA).

Its facilities were destroyed by a tornado in 1999, but was rebuilt within 18 months.
