= Haysville USD 261 =

Public school district in Haysville, Kansas

Haysvile USD 261

Address
- 1745 W. Grand Ave. Haysville, Kansas, 67060; United States
- Coordinates: 37°33′56″N 97°22′31″W

District information
- Type: Public
- Grades: Pre-K to 12

Other information
- Website: usd261.com

Haysville USD 261 is a public unified school district headquartered in Haysville, Kansas, United States. The district includes the communities of Haysville, small southern part of Wichita, and nearby rural areas.

== Schools ==
The school district operates the following schools:

High schools

- Campus High School
- Haysville High School

Middle schools

- Haysville Middle School
- Haysville West Middle School

Elementary schools

- Freeman Elementary
- Nelson Elementary
- Oatville Elementary
- Prairie Elementary
- Rex Elementary
- Ruth Clark Elementary

Specialty facilities

- Haysville High School/Charter School
- Tri-City Day School
- Learning By Design Charter School
- Early Childhood

== See also ==
- Kansas State Department of Education
- Kansas State High School Activities Association
- List of high schools in Kansas
- List of unified school districts in Kansas
