= Century II Performing Arts & Convention Center =

Performing arts and convention center in Wichita, Kansas

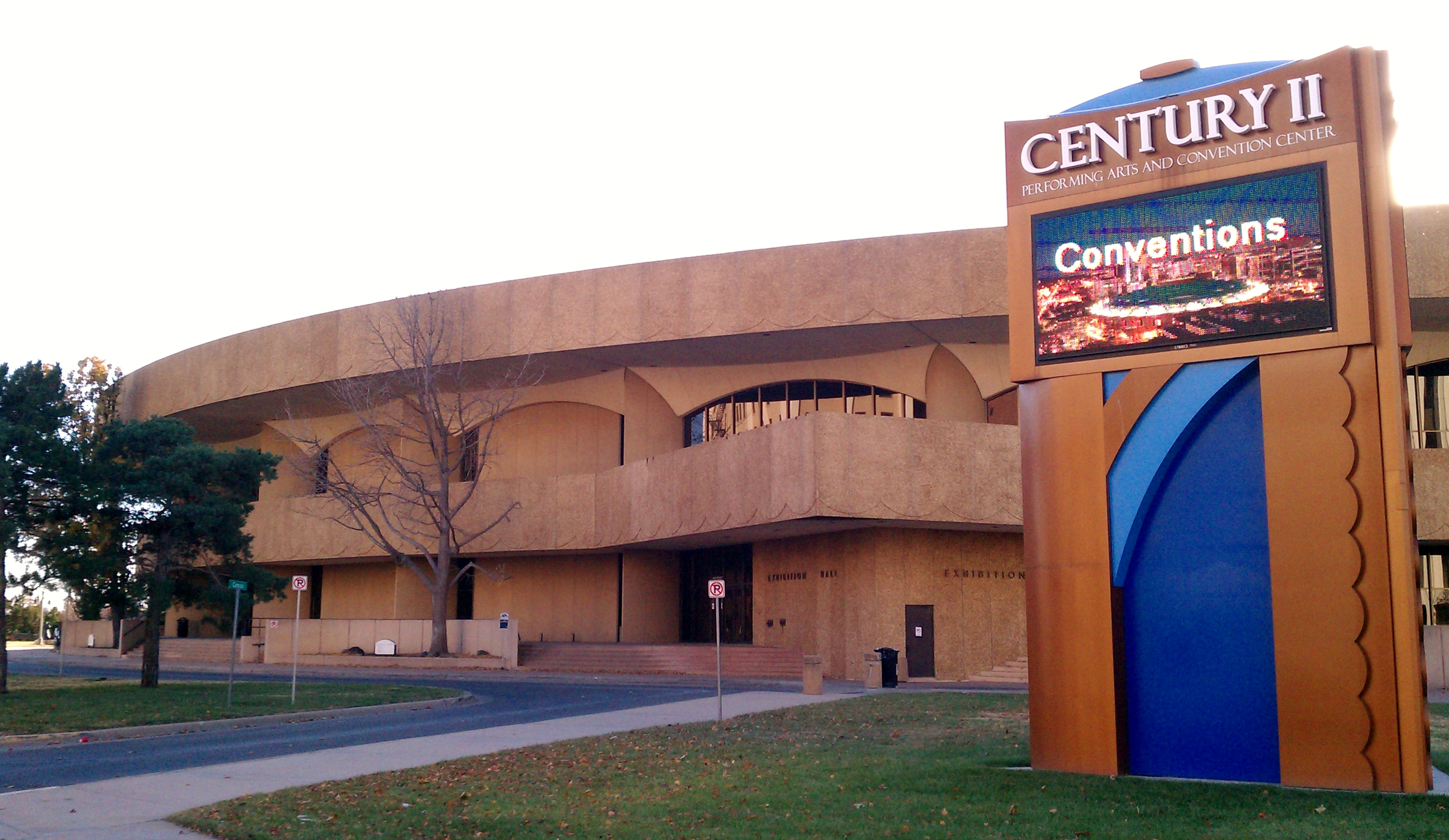
- Interactive map of Century II Performing Arts & Convention Center
- Address: 225 W. Douglas Avenue; Wichita, Kansas 67202 USA
- Coordinates: 37.684876°N 97.340283°W
- Owner: City of Wichita
- Operator: ASM Global

Construction
- Opened: 1969

Website
- century2.com

Century II Performing Arts & Convention Center is a performing arts and convention center in Wichita, Kansas, United States. It is located between Douglas Street and Waterman Street near the east bank of the Arkansas River in downtown Wichita. It was listed on the National Register of Historic Places in 2020. The convention center is operated by Kansas native Phillip Anschutz's ASM Global.

Century II is the largest center for entertainment, consumer shows and meetings in Wichita and is home to four arts organizations - Wichita Symphony Orchestra, Wichita Grand Opera, Music Theatre Wichita, and Music Theatre for Young People.

The facility has almost 200,000 sq ft (19,000 m^{2}) of contiguous exhibit space, 20 meeting rooms, a Concert Hall that seats 2,197 people in continental seating, the Mary Jane Teall Theatre that seats 650 people in continental seating, and Convention Hall that seats 4,700 people.

The Performing Arts and Convention Center hosted Miss USA pageants from 1990 to 1993 and Miss Teen USA 1995, as well as the 1989 ABC Masters bowling tournament.

== History ==
The facility was designed by John M. Hickman and opened January 11, 1969, to commemorate the centennial anniversary of Wichita's incorporation in 1870. It was constructed on the site of The Forum, a convention center and exposition hall that opened in 1911. By the 1960s, The Forum was showing its age and did not have adequate facilities that performances or shows required.

The 1926 Wurlitzer organ from the Paramount Theatre (New York City) was removed prior to that theater's demolition and installed in the Century II Convention Hall. Prior to the demolition of the Paramount Theatre, the organ was acquired by Richard Simonton of Los Angeles. In the 1970s, the organ was moved to the Century II Convention Center in Wichita, Kansas. The organ continues to be used today for concerts and other events.

The building is a low circular structure with a shallow domed roof in the style of Frank Lloyd Wright. A similar structure is the Marin County Civic Center in California. John Hickman was an apprentice of Wright's at Taliesin West in the late 1940s. A quote from the daughter of the architect, Susan Hickman, says that her father felt that the inspiration for the building was the vast fields of wheat (represented by the sand-colored pillars) and the limitless sky (by the pale blue-colored dome). The lobby encircles the main level with convention hall, exhibition hall and concert hall occupying wedge-shaped areas within the ring. The stages of the three spaces abut in the building's center.

An additional exhibit hall named for former Wichita City Commissioner and Mayor Bob Brown was added to the original structure in 1986. The hall contains an additional 93,000 sq ft (8,600 m^{2}) of exhibit space with an 8,000 sq ft (740 m^{2}) lobby. In 1997, the 303-room Hyatt Regency Wichita hotel was constructed and connected to the center.

Renovations on the concert hall began in August 2010. Work included painting, installation of new seats, carpeting and draperies and an upgrade of electrical systems. Crews had a window of just less than two months to work between scheduled events. In October, the center unveiled the renovated areas along with a new logo. The logo was unpopular with many area residents and quickly dropped.

== Notable performers and productions ==
Century II has served as the main performing venue for resident arts organizations including Wichita Grand Opera, Wichita Symphony Orchestra and Music Theatre Wichita. Through these organizations, the venue has hosted opera, classical music and musical-theatre productions involving internationally known performers.

Wichita Grand Opera performances at Century II have included appearances by Samuel Ramey, Lucas Meachem, Nayden Todorov, Michael Spyres, Zvetelina Vassileva, Annalisa Raspagliosi, Stefano de Peppo, Larisa Martínez, Aaron Blake, Michael Nansel, Eugene Kohn, Ricardo Tamura and Yunnie Park.

The Century II Concert Hall has also been associated with Music Theatre Wichita, which produces Broadway-scale summer musicals at the venue. Performers associated with Music Theatre Wichita's Century II activity include Kristin Chenoweth, Kelli O'Hara, Ashley Park, Matt Bogart, Jenni Barber, Christiani Pitts and Chris Mann. In 2022, Music Theatre Wichita's production of Kinky Boots at Century II featured Drew Lachey and Kenneth Mosley. Broadway touring productions documented at Century II have included Hamilton, The Lion King, Wicked, The Book of Mormon, Dear Evan Hansen and Beetlejuice.

== Gallery ==
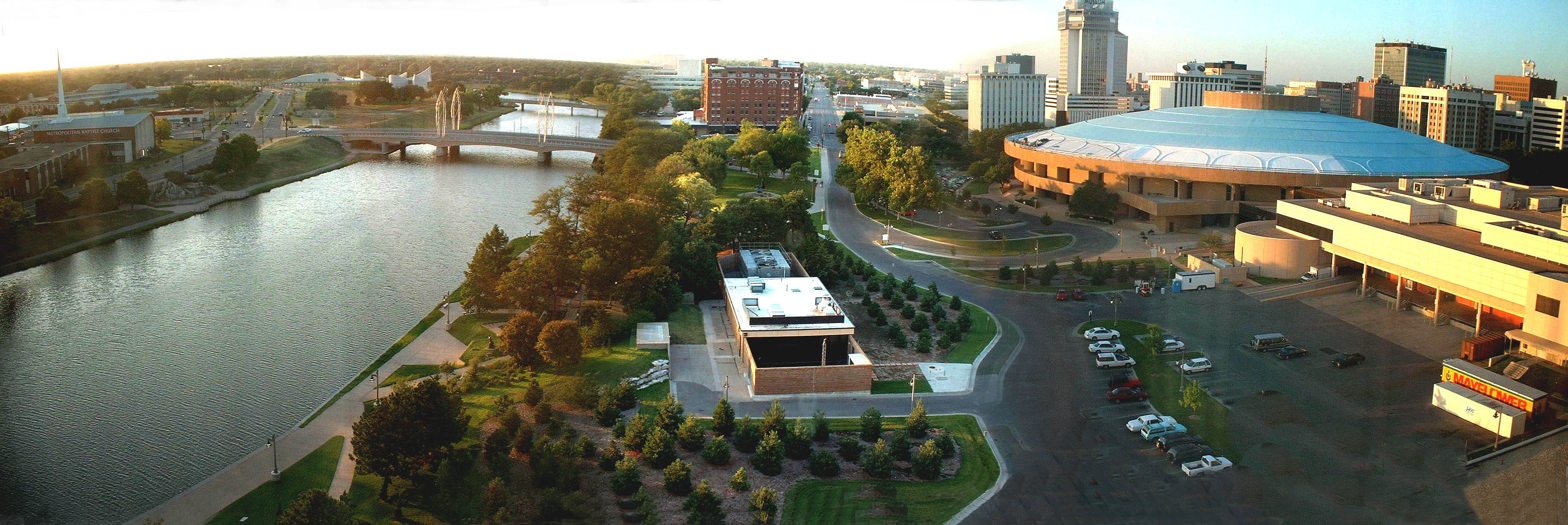
View of the east bank of the Arkansas River in downtown Wichita. Century II is in the upper right.(photo taken from the Hyatt Regency Wichita)

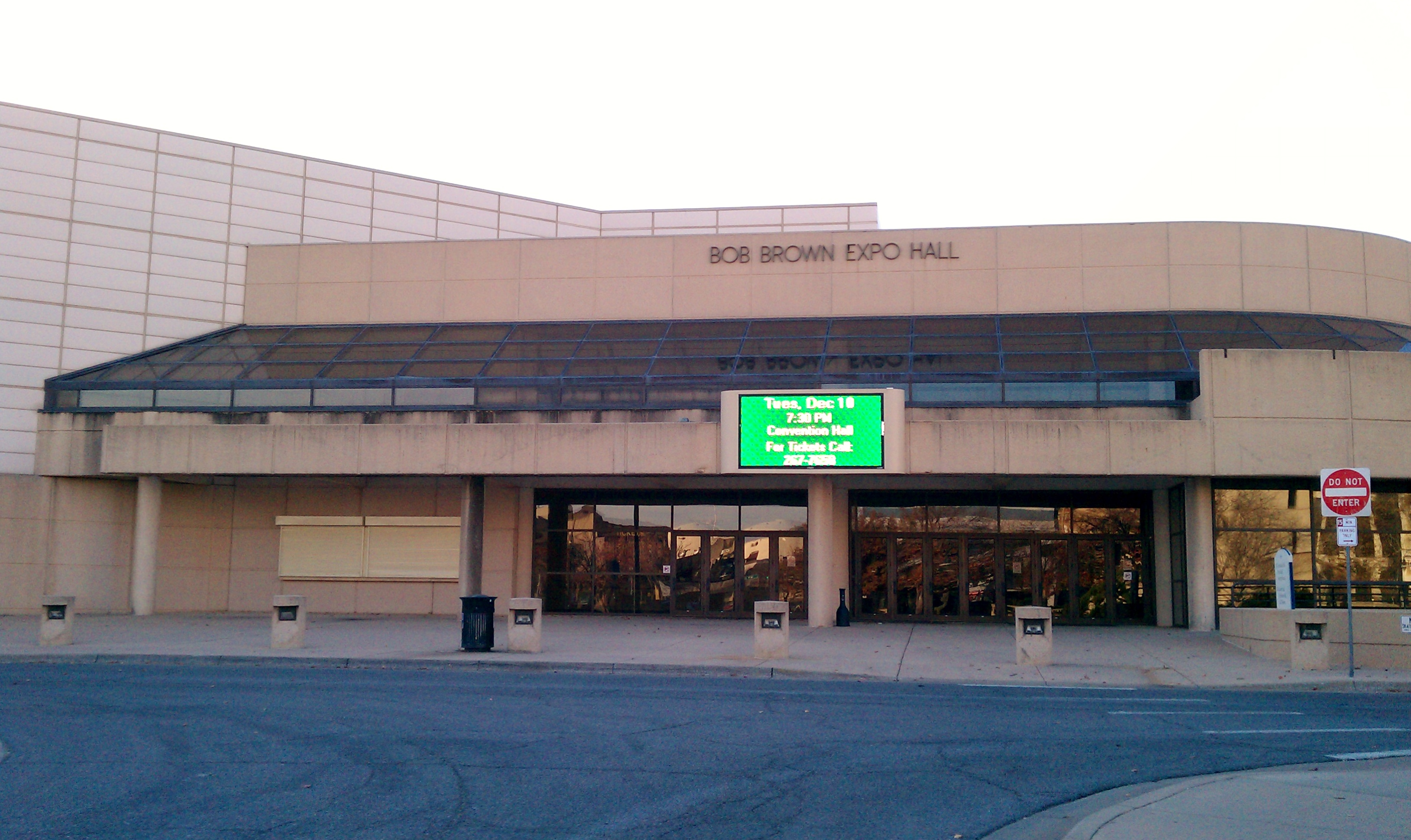
The Bob Brown Expo Hall at Century II

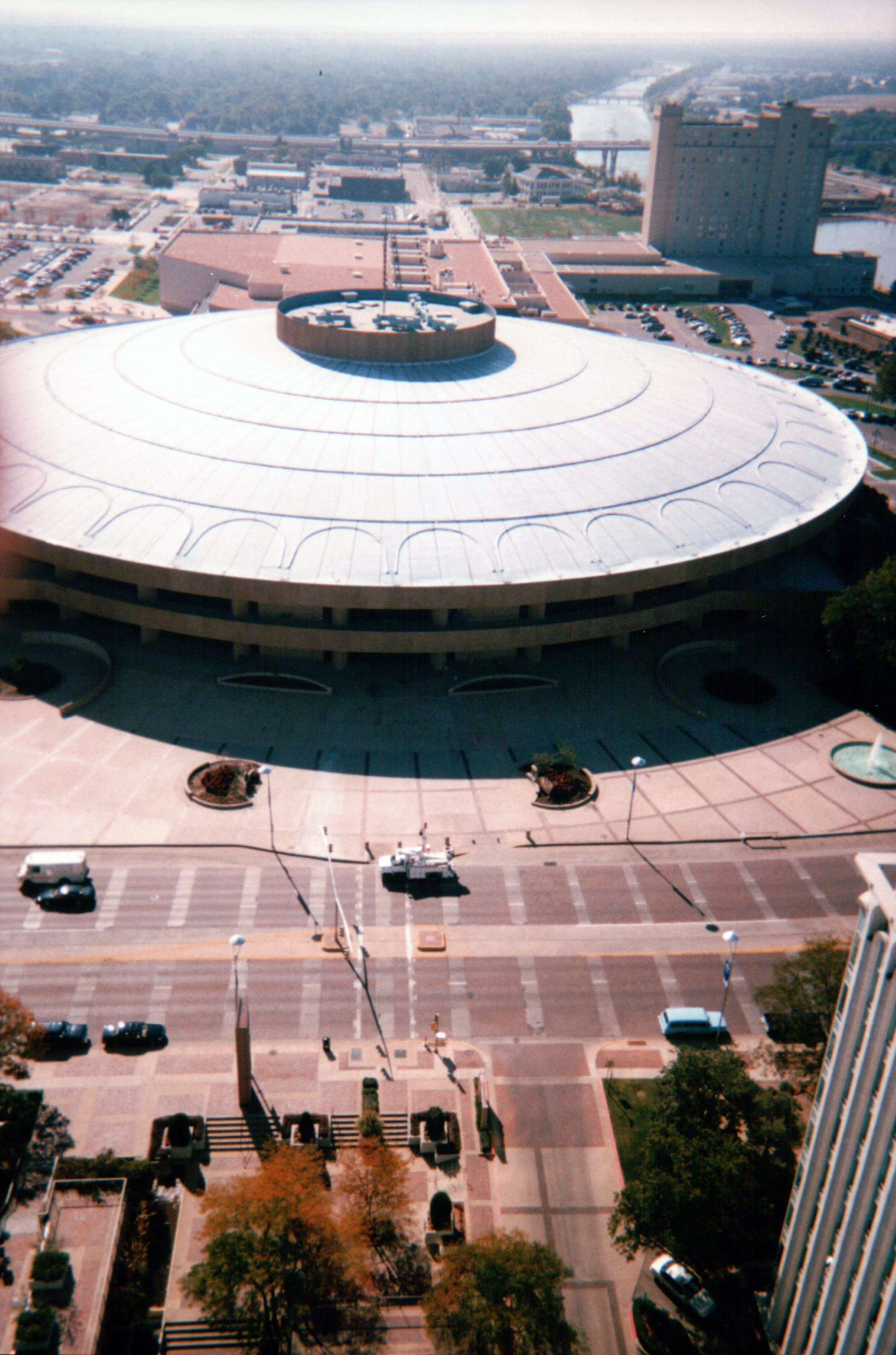
Century II as seen from the roof of 250 Douglas Place, then known as the Garvey Center, in 1999.
