= Vickers Petroleum Service Station =

- U.S. National Register of Historic Places
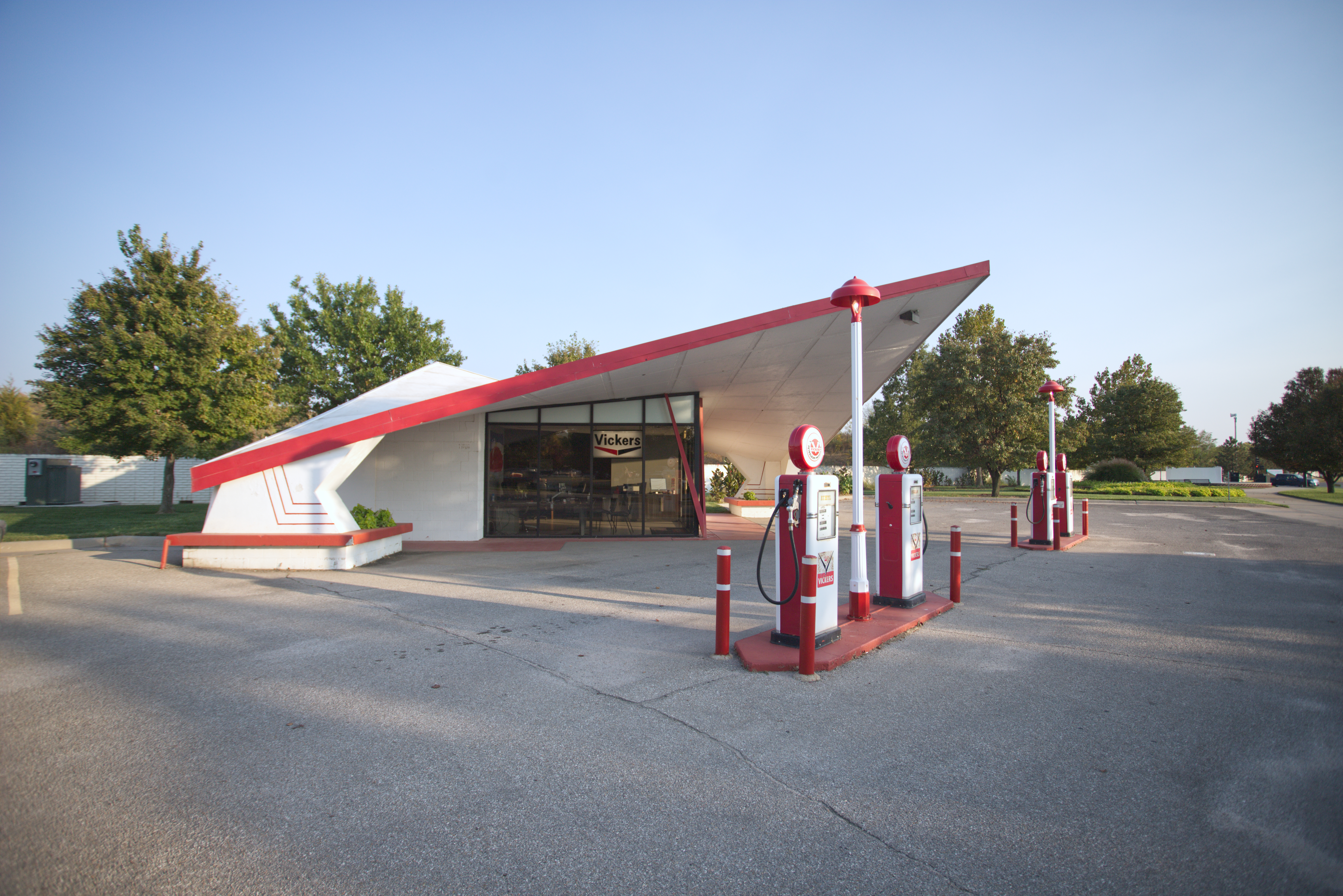
- Vickers Petroleum Service Station

- Location within Kansas Location within the United States
- Location: 140 N Main St., Haysville, Kansas
- Coordinates: 37°33′55″N 97°21′08″W
- Built: 1954
- NRHP reference No.: 100004455
- Added to NRHP: September 30, 2019

The Vickers Petroleum Service Station is a historic building constructed in 1954 in Haysville, Kansas. It was the first service station to feature a hyperbolic paraboloid form, also known as a "batwing", developed by John M. Hickman and was placed on the National Register of Historic Places September 30, 2019.

Haysville's Chamber of Commerce has used the building as an office since the interior was remodeled in 2007, which still retains it's branding of Vickers Petroleum.

== See also ==
- National Register of Historic Places listings in Sedgwick County, Kansas
