= Jack A. Vickers =

American oil and sports executive

Jack A. Vickers Jr. (August 8, 1925 – September 24, 2018) was an oil and sports executive who started work for Vickers Petroleum Company in 1946 as a scout. After he held vice president positions from 1949 to 1952, Vickers became president of Vickers Petroleum in 1952. During the 1960s, he was an executive for Bell Oil & Gas and TransOcean Oil. Vickers also worked as a chair for Vickers Energy Corporation from 1973 to 1980.

For his sports career, Vickers played in amateur golf events between the 1940s to 1950s. As an executive, he sponsored a Wichita team that was part of the National Industrial Basketball League in the 1950s. With the National Hockey League during the 1970s, he helped buy the Kansas City Scouts before he was a co-owner of the Colorado Rockies. After creating the Castle Pines Golf Club alongside Jack Nicklaus in 1981, The International was held there as a tournament on the PGA Tour until 2007. Vickers joined the Colorado Sports Hall of Fame in 1999 and was given the PGA Tour Lifetime Achievement Award in 2014.

== Early life and education ==
Vickers was born in Colorado Springs, Colorado on August 8, 1925. He lived with his seven siblings and parents before his father died in 1940. For his post-secondary education, Vickers started out at Regis College before he played golf at the University of Oklahoma. When World War II was occurring in between his studies, Vickers was a member of the United States Coast Guard.

== Career ==
=== Oil career ===
After Vickers ended his post-secondary education in 1946, Vickers began working as a scout for the Vickers Petroleum Company that year. In 1949, Vickers started working in oil lands as a vice president for Vickers Petroleum before becoming the company's vice president in 1952. That year, Vickers was selected as the new president for Vickers Petroleum. During 1953, he started an oil partnership called Vickers Exploration. Some people Vickers worked alongside in the Oklahoma company included Sam Goldwyn and Jack Benny.

While in Oklahoma, Vickers became an executive for Bell Oil & Gas in 1965 after he bought the Tulsa company that year. During the 1960s, Vickers also became an American Petroleum Institute executive on multiple occasions. In 1968, Swift and Company bought the Vickers and Bell companies. When Swift and Company became a part owner of TransOcean Oil in 1969, Vickers held directorship positions for both companies.

In 1973, Swift and Company was scheduled to rename themselves to Esmark. That year, Vickers was a chair of the Vickers Energy Corporation as part of Esmark. Vickers continued working with Vickers Energy before the company was bought in 1980.

=== Golf ===
When he was 13, Vickers began to compete at golf events. In amateur golf events, Vickers was defeated in the semi-finals of the 1947 Wichita championship held by the Wichita Golf Association. For state events, Vickers was one of the final 16 golfers in the 1946 Kansas amateur championship. The following year, Vickers made it to the first round of the Oklahoma amateur championship. In 1950, Vickers reached the final of the Trans-Mississippi Championship. He was scheduled to play in a qualification event for the 1953 U.S. Amateur.

In 1971, Vickers began working in Palm Desert on a "planned residential and residential development" at Ironwood Country Club alongside Arnold Palmer and Robert M. Haynie. Vickers remained a part of the project until 1973. In 1981, Vickers co-created the Castle Pines Golf Club alongside Jack Nicklaus.

In 1984, Vickers requested to have Castle Pines host a PGA Tour tournament. Two years later, Castle Pines began hosting The International tournament for the PGA. The Castle Rock, Colorado event remained on the PGA Tour until Vickers cancelled The International in 2007 due to lack of sponsorships. By the time of his death in 2018, Vickers had joined the Augusta National Golf Club.

=== Additional sports ===
Vickers and his company were sponsors of a Wichita team made their National Industrial Basketball League debut in 1955. He continued to back the basketball team throughout the 1950s. During the preparations for the 1976 Winter Olympics, Vickers was credited for creating a National Advisory Committee in August 1972. The NAC was created while Denver was the selected Olympic host city before backing out in November 1972.

While at Vickers Energy, he helped buy the Kansas City Scouts in 1976 before the National Hockey League team was relocated. When the team became the Colorado Rockies, Vickers worked as a co-owner. In 1978, Vickers ended his ownership of the Rockies when he sold the team to Arthur Imperatore.

As part of the University of Colorado in the late 1970s, Vickers worked for the Flatirons Club as their leader. While with the booster club, Vickers asked Chuck Fairbanks to leave the New England Patriots and become the head coach of Colorado's football team. At the time, Fairbanks was signed as head coach of the National Football League team until 1983 before being granted the transfer in 1979.

== Awards and honors ==
During his business career, Vickers was named Oil Man of the Year for Kansas in 1957. The following year, he was selected by Esquire Magazine as one of their "Bright Young Men In Business" in 1958. Vickers was named Person of the Year for the Colorado Golf Hall of Fame during 1985. He received the Robert M. Kirchner Award from the Colorado Open in 1994. In 2014, Vickers was given the PGA Tour Lifetime Achievement Award.

From 2008 to 2013, the Jack A. Vickers Invitational and the Jack A. Vickers Boys & Girls Club were created. For hall of fames, Vickers became part of the Colorado Golf Hall of Fame in 1985 and the Colorado Sports Hall of Fame in 1999. During the 2000s, he became part of the Denver & Colorado Travel Industry Hall of Fame in 2007. Vickers was additionally named into the Colorado Business Hall of Fame in 2009.

== Personal life and death ==
Vickers had ten children during his marriage. His death occurred on September 24, 2018.
