= Samuel B. Amidon =

American lawyer and politician

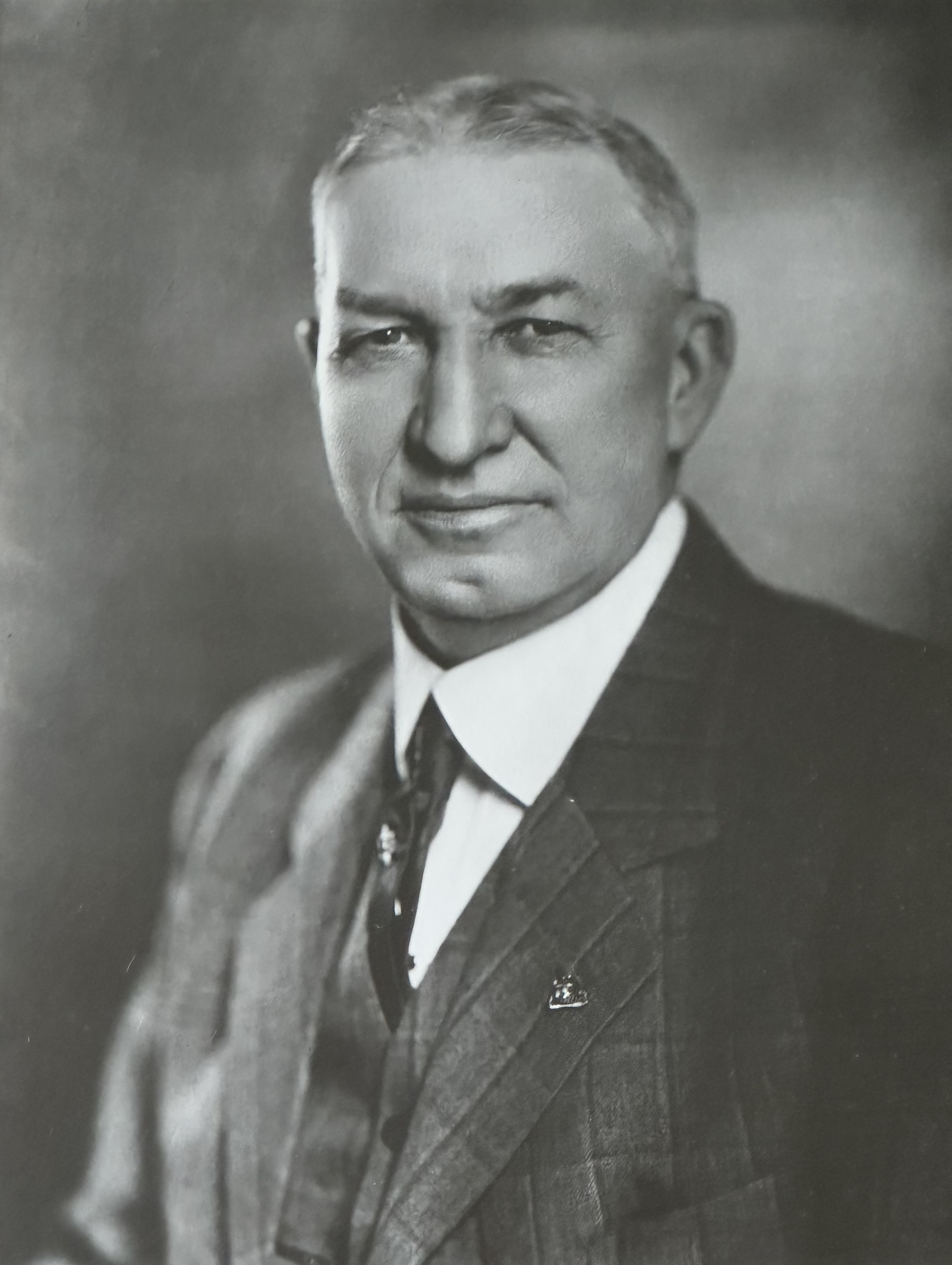
- Samuel B. Amidon (c. 1922)

2nd Vice Chair of the Democratic National Committee
- In office February 27, 1919 – May 8, 1925

County Attorney of Sedgwick County, Kansas
- In office January 11, 1897 – January 14, 1901
- Preceded by: John Davis
- Succeeded by: James F. Conley

Personal details
- Born: Samuel Barker Amidon; May 3, 1863 Geneva, Ohio, US
- Died: May 8, 1925 (aged 62) Wichita, Kansas, US
- Party: Democratic Party
- Spouse: Alice L. Noyes (m. 1893)
- Education: Oberlin College; Hiram College; Cleveland Law School
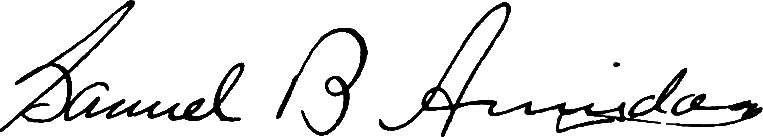
- Signature

Samuel Barker Amidon (May 3, 1863 – May 8, 1925) was an American lawyer, politician, and philanthropist who served as county attorney of Sedgwick County, Kansas from 1897 to 1901, and later as a vice chair of the Democratic National Committee from 1919 until his death in 1925. A staunch progressive Democrat and close personal friend of President Woodrow Wilson, Amidon also delivered the successful motion to nominate James M. Cox as the 1920 Democratic nominee for president. He is the namesake of several Wichita landmarks, including Amidon Avenue on the city's west side, Amidon Bridge across the Arkansas River, and the Amidon House, his residence of 29 years.

Dubbed "the Greatest Attorney in the Middle West," Amidon advised, prosecuted, and defended several notable outlaws of the American Old West, including Bill Dalton of the Doolin-Dalton Gang and John Callahan, mentor to Pretty Boy Floyd. In the 1896 election, he was elected as Sedgwick County Attorney on the Populist Party ticket, then reelected in 1898 as a Democrat, soon dealing with the fallout of temperance activist Carrie Nation's famous attack on the Carey Hotel saloon. Amidon's legal prowess, civic engagement, and philanthropic efforts earned him widespread respect and influence in the city of Wichita, along with the lifelong moniker of "Colonel."

== Early life and education ==
Amidon was born to Henry W. and Mary Ette (Barker) Amidon on his father's farm near Perry, Ohio on May 3, 1863, the youngest of six children. His ancestors, both paternal and maternal, trace back to the founders of the Connecticut Colony, and include veterans of the French and Indian War and the American Revolutionary War.

Amidon was educated in his native county and graduated as valedictorian of Geneva Normal School in 1880. He studied at Oberlin and Hiram Colleges before teaching for two terms and beginning his study of law in 1884. Graduating second in his class of 103 at Cleveland Law School, Amidon was admitted to the bar by the Ohio Supreme Court in February 1886, and relocated to Wichita, Kansas in September of that year "with no money but plenty of grit and determination."

== Legal career ==
Establishing his practice in the growing former cattle town of Wichita, Amidon quickly earned a reputation as a shrewd, effective lawyer and a powerfully persuasive speaker. His reputation became so pronounced that one article in the Wichita Eagle reported that Amidon "went to Andale yesterday to engage in a law suit, and when the opposition got sight of him they threw up the case." By the time of his first term as County Attorney, Amidon had "built up one of the most lucrative practices in Sedgwick County."

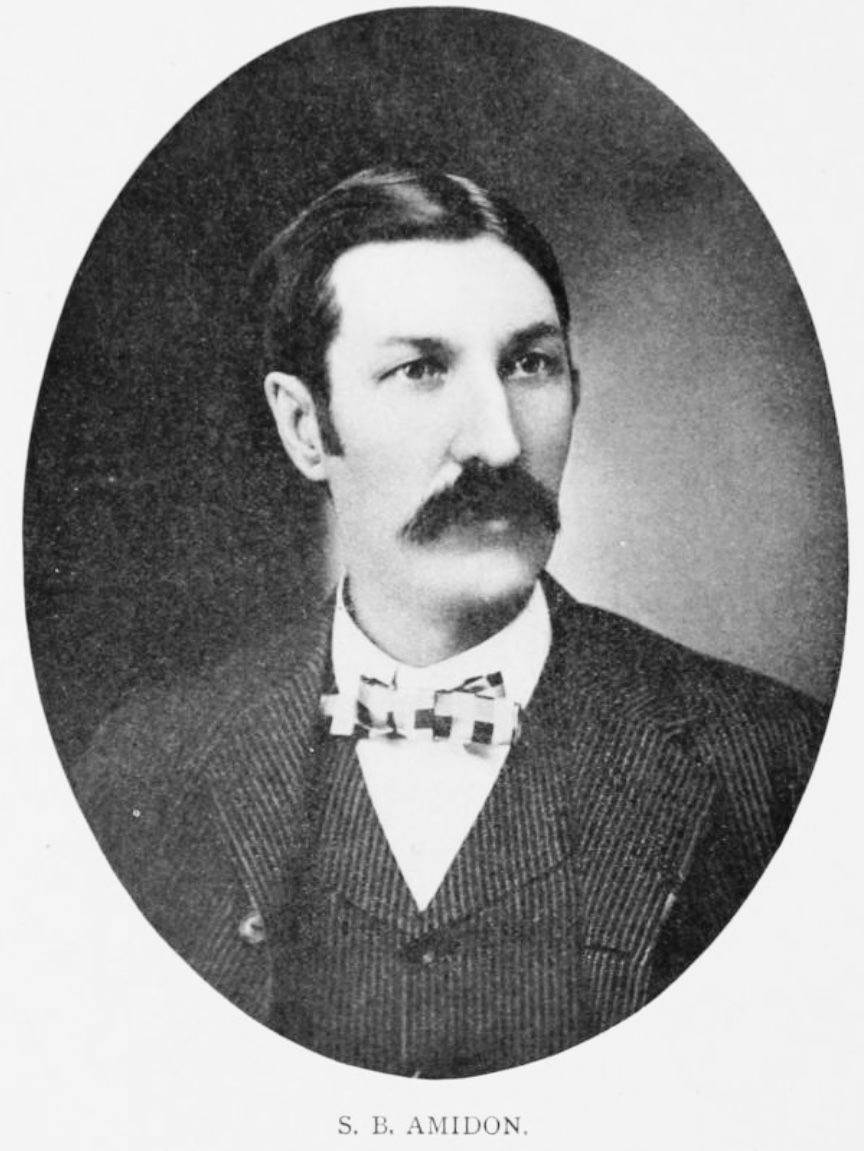
Amidon during his tenure as Sedgwick County Attorney, 1897.

=== Carrie Nation ===
On the morning of December 27, 1900, in the waning days of Amidon's final term as county attorney, radical temperance activist Carrie Nation entered the ground floor saloon of the Carey Hotel along Douglas Avenue and proceeded to wreak havoc at the bar, damaging a $300 painting with a rock before throwing a pool ball through a $100 mirror. After her arrest, Nation remained defiant and dared prosecutors to bring charges against her, declaring "The law can't touch me on this, and I am going to make it hot for other saloons in this town as soon as they release me."

Against Amidon's "earnest protest," Sedgwick County Sheriff Charles W. Simmons then enforced a three-week quarantine at the Sedgwick County jail in what was likely an underhanded move to prevent Nation from bonding out. Amidon's final act as county attorney occurred at the state Capitol in Topeka on January 12, reluctantly representing Sheriff Simmons in front of an unimpressed Kansas Supreme Court.

The Court ordered Nation's immediate release and for the commencement of her trial on January 15, by which point Amidon's term had expired. His successor quickly dropped the charges against Nation, stating that "she is laboring under a delusion to such an extent that she is not responsible for her acts." Besides, according to the Wichita Beacon, the people of the city "[thought] her punishment sufficient," apparently viewing her antics with bemusement despite what, in current dollars, amounted to over $14,500 in intentional property damage.

=== Return to private practice ===
After retiring from public office, Amidon started a legal partnership with Judge David M. Dale in 1903. The firm of Dale & Amidon became "one of the most prominent and influential in the state and include[d] among its clients a number of the most important financial, industrial and commercial interests of southern Kansas" and "appeared in connection with the most important litigations in the state and federal courts." The firm is still in operation today under the name of McDonald-Tinker.

Amidon's legal reputation was largely based on criminal prosecution and defense, although he "handled ten civil suits to every criminal suit in which he appeared."

== Political career ==
A member of the Democratic Party, Amidon was active in politics from the start of his career, using his persuasive oratory to campaign for Democratic candidates at all levels and his wealth to support their campaigns.

=== Sedgwick County Attorney ===
Despite Kansas' historical affinity for the Republican Party, its fracture with the progressive Populist Party during the 1890s created an unprecedented opportunity for Democratic victories in the state, including a majority in the Kansas Legislature which selected the state's first-ever Democratic U.S. Senator in 1893. This political context, combined with Amidon's respected legal reputation, emboldened him to run for Sedgwick County attorney in 1896.

Sedgwick County Attorney election, 1896
Party	Candidate	Votes	%
Populist	Samuel B. Amidon	4,854	51.7
Republican	John Davis (incumbent)	4,524	48.3
Total votes		9,378	100

Sedgwick County Attorney election, 1898
Party	Candidate	Votes	%
Democratic	Samuel B. Amidon (incumbent)	4,770	56.8
Republican	J.A. Brubacher	3,621	43.2
Total votes		8,391	100

=== Friendship with President Wilson ===
Amidon was widely known for his close personal friendship with U.S. President Woodrow Wilson. After election to a committee to notify the president of his renomination at the 1916 Democratic National Convention in St. Louis, Amidon traveled to Wilson's summer home in New Jersey. It was "at the luncheon table and during the two hours of visiting that Col. Amidon studied the President's personality and formed an opinion of his sincerity," after which he declared the president a "decent, fair fellow - a sociable, high-minded individual."

The friendship continued to grow from there, with President Wilson paying a visit to Wichita on September 26, 1919. The president planned to disembark his train and speak to a waiting crowd of 10,000 people, with Amidon delivering the introduction. However, upon approach to Union Station, Wilson's health rapidly deteriorated and his scheduled public appearances were cancelled at the last minute. The Wichita Eagle reported that "before the President's train started on its return trip to Washington, the president received Col. Amidon aboard the Mayflower for a few moments," and that Amidon was "probably the only Wichita citizen who saw the president." Less than a week later on October 2, Wilson secretly suffered a massive and debilitating stroke from which he never fully recovered.

Despite any awkwardness over Wilson's refusal to endorse a successor at the 1920 Democratic National Convention, Amidon's friendship persisted to the point that he was "one of the few friends at the bedside just before [Wilson] died" in 1924.

=== Democratic National Committee ===
Beyond serving as a delegate to each Democratic National Convention since 1888, Amidon's influence in the national party remained relatively informal until his election as Kansas' Democratic National Committeeman in 1917. Likely aided by his friendship with President Wilson, Amidon was elected as a national Vice Chair of the DNC on February 26, 1919, a position he would hold until his death in 1925.

=== 1920 Democratic National Convention ===
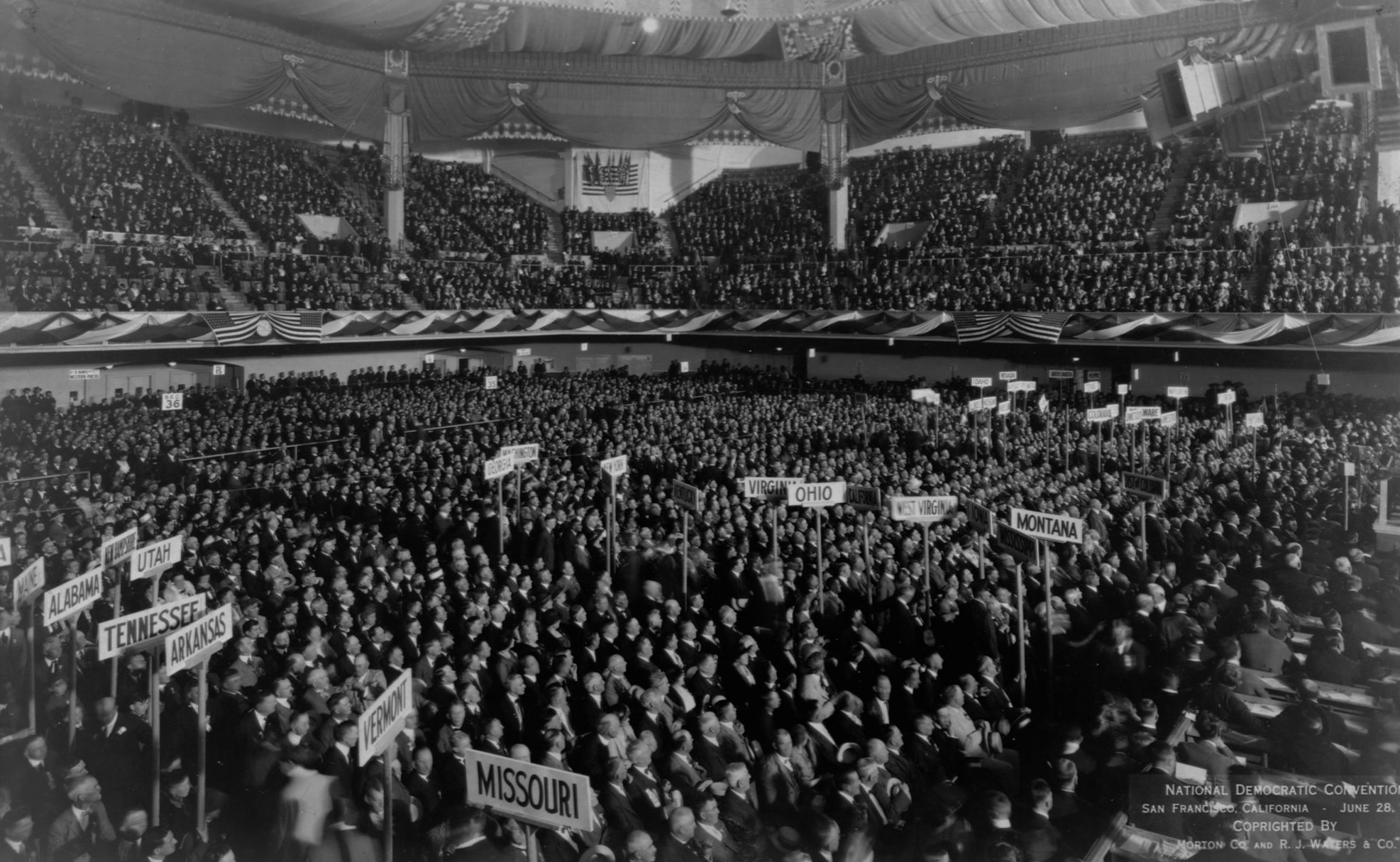
The convention hall at the 1920 DNC in San Francisco.

Despite being seriously ill, physically immobile, and isolated in seclusion, President Wilson was determined to run for a third term. Refusing to endorse a successor, Wilson hoped to force a deadlocked 1920 Democratic National Convention to nominate him instead.

In an uncomfortable position, Amidon was torn between loyalty to his friend and the duty to nominate an electable candidate. Amidon attempted both, leading the convention forces behind Wilson's son-in-law and former Treasury Secretary William Gibbs McAdoo. Widely seen as the strongest candidate in the field, and initially the leader in the delegate count, McAdoo began bleeding support after the New York delegation and other Northern delegates continually blocked his nomination in protest of his support for Prohibition.

After 44 ballots, it became increasingly clear that the delegates would settle on Ohio Governor James M. Cox as a dark horse compromise candidate. Sensing defeat, Amidon took the platform at 1:40am on July 6 and moved to nominate Cox by unanimous acclimation. The motion was met with "a roar from the tired and worn delegates which lasted a full four minutes." Governor Cox and his running mate, Assistant Secretary of the Navy and future President Franklin D. Roosevelt, were defeated in a landslide by Republicans Warren G. Harding and Calvin Coolidge in November.

== Personal life and death ==
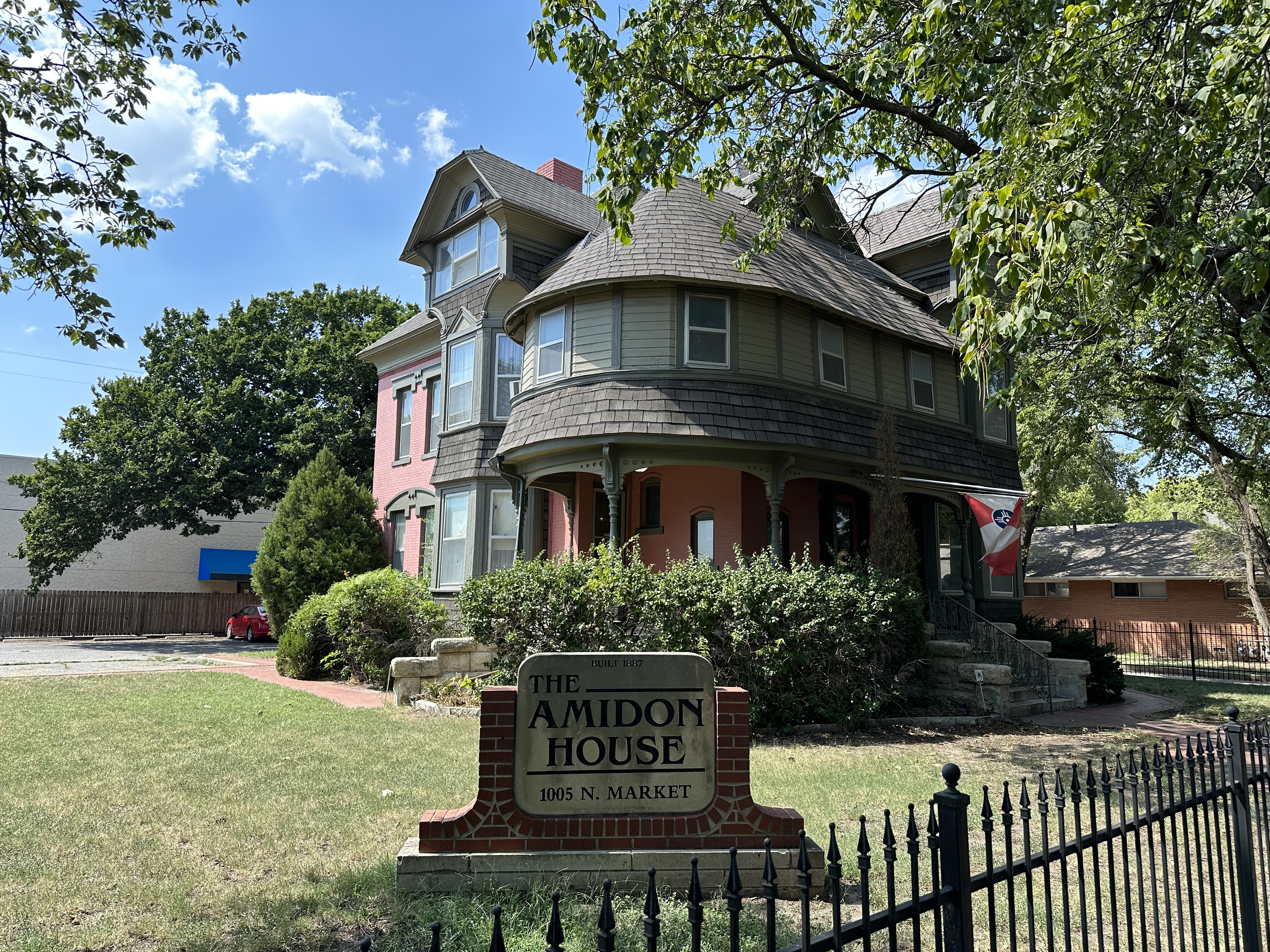
The Amidon House, Amidon's residence from 1896 until his death.

Amidon married Alice L. Noyes, the daughter of an early Wichita pioneer family, on November 16, 1893.

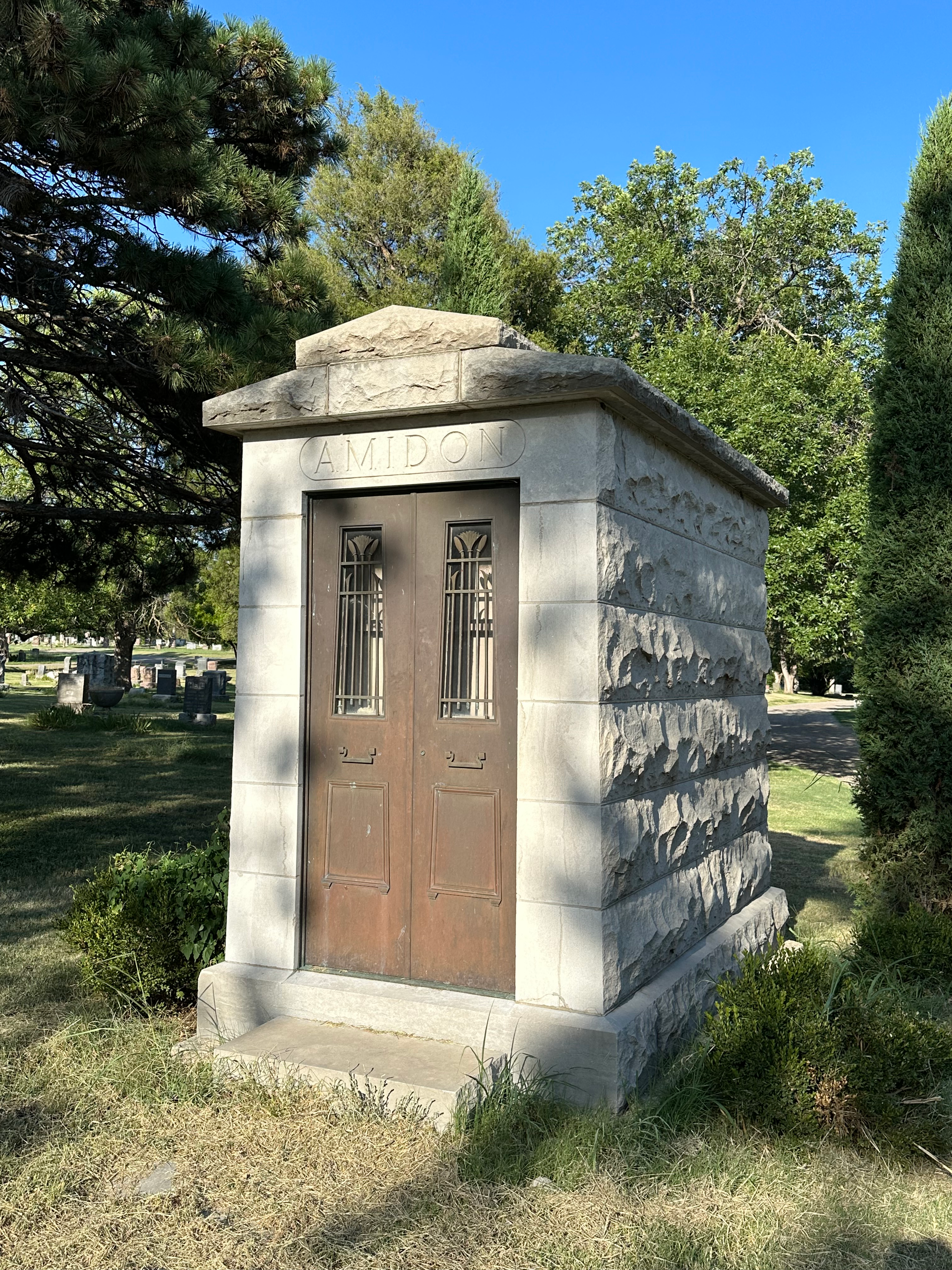
Amidon's grave in Wichita's Maple Grove Cemetery.

While preparing to return home from his office on the evening of Friday, May 8, 1925, Amidon felt a surge of chest pain and phoned his physician and lifelong friend, Dr. J.Z. Hoffman. Amidon greeted Hoffman a short while later with his last words, "Hello, Doctor," and was dead of heart failure less than five minutes later.

The news of Amidon's death was met with widespread grief in the Wichita community. Newspapers ran front-page retrospectives on his life, career, and contributions to the city.

Amidon's funeral was held the following Wednesday at Wichita's Scottish Rite Center, where "[m]ore than 2,000 friends crowded into the temple and... as many were turned away." Newspapers noted that "[f]ully half the mourners were people without wealth, men, women, and children whom [Amidon] had befriended at some time during their lives." Amidon received Scottish Rite services before his body was taken to Maple Grove Cemetery, where it received a simple Masonic burial.
