= Wichita State University Libraries =

US research library system

- Location: Wichita, Kansas
- Type: Academic
- Established: 1895 (as Fairmount College Library)
- Branches: 3

Collection
- Size: over 2 million volumes

Access and use
- Population served: Students, Staff and Faculty of Wichita State University, surrounding community

Other information
- Director: Brent Mai
- Website: www.wichita.edu/services/libraries/index.php

Wichita State University Libraries are a research library system with holdings of more than 2 million volumes, over 400 databases, and close to 60,000 journal subscriptions.

Located on the university's main campus in Wichita, Kansas, United States, University Libraries serve the approximately 15,000 enrolled students of Wichita State University (WSU) while also providing services to the surrounding community. University Libraries serves as a regional United States Federal Government Documents Depository, a State of Kansas Government Documents Depository, and is the State of Kansas only Patents and Trademarks Library. University Libraries Special Collections and University Archives contains numerous rare books and incunabula, historical manuscripts collections and maps, photographic archives documenting Kansas history, and hosts the Wichita Photo Archives.

== History of University Libraries ==
University Libraries has played a prominent role on the WSU campus throughout its history, beginning with the institution's founding as Fairmount College in 1895. The first campus library was a reading room on the third floor of Fairmount Hall, the first building constructed on campus. Paul Roulet, who was hired as a professor of mathematics and French served as the campus' first librarian until his death in 1903.

By the end of the first decade of the 20th century, library collections had exceeded 20,000 volumes and had massively outgrown the original reading room in Fairmount Hall. The university opened its first library building, the Morrison Library, (named for the first president of Fairmount College, Nathan J. Morrison) in 1909, with the assistance of a $40,000 grant provided by Andrew Carnegie. The first Morrison Library had a neo-classical design, characterized by the doric-style columns on its façade. These columns are all that remain of this building, which was destroyed by fire in 1964.

By the late 1930s library collections had exceeded the space in the original Morrison Library. A grant from the federal government during the New Deal provided the funds for a new library building, named the University of Wichita Library, opened in 1939. Petitioning by students, faculty and alumni caused the university to rename the library the Morrison Library (present day ).

A post-war economic boom led to a vast expansion of programs at the University of Wichita, increasing yet again the size of library collections, and placing demands for space that exceeded the size of the Morrison Library. A donation of property by Frank and Harvey Ablah, a pair of successful Wichita entrepreneurs made possible the financing of the construction of a new library facility. Ablah Library opened its doors in 1962.

== Current library facilities ==
University libraries currently consist of three facilities located on the main campus of WSU: Ablah Library, McKinley Chemistry Library and Thurlow Lieurance Memorial Music Library.

=== Ablah Library ===
The Ablah Library, opened in 1962, remains the main library on the WSU Campus. Named for brothers Frank and Harvey Ablah, whose donations financed the library's construction, Ablah Library was designed by architect John Hickman, a student of Frank Lloyd Wright. At 157,924 square feet (14,671.6 m^{2}), it is the largest of the University Libraries' facilities and is home to a majority of the circulating print collections, WSU Libraries Special Collections and University Archives, the leisure reading collection, the University Libraries' extensive video collection, textbook collection, Government Publications Depository, and Patent and Trademark collection.

The first floor of Ablah Library is also home to the University Libraries Learning Commons, a flexible-use study space providing patrons with access to high-end production and analysis software, collaborative study technologies and moveable seating and whiteboards that patrons can rearrange and customize to their specific study or research needs. The second floor offers a One Button Studio for user-friendly video production and seminar rooms with video conferencing technology. Study rooms and individual student focus rooms are located throughout the second and third floors - some of which can be reserved online.

=== McKinley Chemistry Library ===
The McKinley Chemistry Library, opened in 1964, provides faculty and students from the WSU Chemistry Department with a dedicated space for study and research. The library is named for Dr. Lloyd McKinley, (1895–1961), who was chair of the WSU Chemistry department from 1927 to 1960. Located on the first floor of McKinley Hall, the Chemistry Library is 2600 square feet in size and houses the University Libraries' collections of core chemistry journals in print, reference materials and course reserves for the WSU Chemistry department.

=== Thurlow Lieurance Memorial Music Library ===
The Thurlow Lieurance Memorial Music Library, located on the third floor of Jardine Hall, houses the Music and Foreign Language collections of the University Libraries. Named for the Wichita-area composer and former Dean of the WSU School of Music Thurlow Lieurance (1878–1963), this library includes a language-learning lab as well as the over 54,000 volumes of the University Libraries' music collection, including over 9,000 compact disks and over 32,000 music scores.

== Collections and holdings ==
On September 11, 2013, the University Libraries celebrated the addition of the 2 millionth volume to its collections. In addition to print books, the University Libraries currently provide access to 236 electronic scholarly databases, and maintain subscriptions to over 70,000 academic journals. The collections also include over 432,000 e-books, over 4,200 DVDs, and an extensive textbook collection serving many of the courses offered at WSU.

University Libraries has been a Federal Depository library since 1901, collecting and providing the public with access to a wide variety of materials published by the U.S. government, as well as the government of the state of Kansas. Since 1991, University Libraries has also been the only Patent and Trademark Depository library in the State of Kansas. Holdings include access to a vast collection of information on patents and trademarks filed in the United States, dating back to 1790. This collection is open to the public and library staff provide patrons with preliminary patent and trademark research by appointment at no charge.

== WSU Special Collections and University Archives ==
WSU Special Collections and University Archives includes rare books, incunabula, historical Kansas maps, photographs, records of the history of Wichita State University (as well as its preceding institutions, the University of Wichita and Fairmount College) and a growing manuscript collection of more than 700,000 documents. The library currently holds over 200 digital collections. One example of their digital collection is that of their oil industry photographs that provide a peak into the oil industry with images depicting a time period between 1924 and 1949. Additional featured archival collections include the papers of abolitionist William Lloyd Garrison, the Baughman Collection of Early Kansas Maps and local history, the Gordon Parks Collection and a number of collections of congressional papers, most notably those of Kansas congressman, and later U.S. secretary of agriculture, Dan Glickman. Digital Collections presented by Special Collections and University Archives feature rare books, historical papers, maps and photographs as well as WSU and Wichita-area history.
