= The International (golf) =

Golf tournament formerly on the PGA Tour

Coordinates: 39.4407°N 104.8985°W

Tournament information
- Location: Castle Rock, Colorado
- Established: 1986
- Course: Castle Pines Golf Club
- Par: 72
- Length: 7,619 yards (6,967 m)
- Tour: PGA Tour
- Format: Modified Stableford
- Prize fund: US$5,500,000
- Month played: August
- Final year: 2006

Tournament record score
- Score: 48 points Phil Mickelson (1997); 48 points Ernie Els (2000)

Final champion
- (United States) Dean Wilson
- Location in the United States Location in Colorado

The International (styled as The INTERNATIONAL) was a professional golf tournament in Colorado on the PGA Tour. It was played for 21 seasons, from 1986 through 2006, at the Castle Pines Golf Club at Castle Pines Village in Castle Rock, south of Denver.

It had the distinction of being one of two PGA Tour events not conducted at traditional stroke play, the only other exception is the match-play event, the WGC-Accenture Match Play Championship. The International was the only tournament to use the Modified Stableford scoring system, enacted because of the significant elevation of the venue, which averages 6,300 feet (1,920 m) above sea level.

Beginning in 2007, the International was scheduled to change dates to be played during the first full weekend of July (July 5–8, and July 4–7, 2008), midway between the U.S. Open and the British Open. Tournament officials hoped this new date would draw even more top-ranked players, such as Tiger Woods, as it would no longer be contested the week before (or after) the year's final major (PGA Championship). Even with the change in dates, both tournament founder Jack A. Vickers and the membership of the club were apparently not happy with the overall direction the PGA Tour was taking.

On February 8, 2007, the PGA Tour announced the permanent cancellation of the International. It was replaced by the AT&T National, hosted by the Tiger Woods Foundation, and held in the Washington, D.C. area; near sea level and at standard stroke play.

The Modified Stableford scoring system returned to the PGA Tour in 2012 at the Reno–Tahoe Open, also at high elevation.

== Format ==
The Modified Stableford system awards points on each hole, based on the score relative to par. It is designed to reward aggressive play, taking chances to go for birdies (or better), as the reward for a low score on a hole is typically greater than the punishment for a poor score. For example, over a two-hole span, a birdie (+2) and a bogey (−1) gain one point, where two pars gain nothing. The scoring operates as follows:

Strokes vs. par	Name	Points
3 under	Albatross (double eagle)	+8
2 under	Eagle	+5
1 under	Birdie	+2
Even	Par	0
1 over	Bogey	−1
2 over +	Double bogey or more	−3

Holes in one are treated as the score relative to par; an ace on a par-3 hole would be considered an eagle and scored as +5.

The International used several different formats throughout its history. Until 1993, final-round scores alone determined the winner; additionally, the event had multiple cuts in every year except 2005.

- 1986: Field cut to 78 after first round; cut to 39 after second round based solely on second-round scores; cut to 12 after third round based solely on third-round scores; winner determined solely by final-round score
- 1987–1988: Field cut to 78 after first round; cut to 54 after second round based solely on second-round scores; cut to 18 after third round based solely on third-round scores; winner determined solely by final-round score
- 1989: Field cut to 72 after second round based on two-round cumulative scores; cut to 24 after third round based solely on third-round scores; winner determined solely by final-round score
- 1990–1992: Field cut to 72 after second round based on two-round cumulative scores; cut to 24 after third round based on three-round cumulative scores; winner determined solely by final-round score
- 1993–1997: Field cut to 72 after second round based on two-round cumulative scores; cut to 24 after third round based on three-round cumulative scores; winner determined by four-round cumulative score
- 1998–2004, 2006: Field cut to top 70 and ties after second round based on two-round cumulative scores; cut to top 35 and ties after third round based on three-round cumulative scores; winner determined by four-round cumulative score
- 2005: Due to rain, schedule changed; no play Thursday; field cut to top 60 and ties after second round based on two-round cumulative scores; 36 holes played on Sunday, with winner determined by four-round cumulative score

== Winners ==
Year	Winner	Score (Note: Between 1986–1992, the winning score (points) were for the final round only.)	Margin of victory	Runner(s)-up	Winner's share ($)
The International
2006	(United States) Dean Wilson	34 points	Playoff	(United States) Tom Lehman	990,000
2005	(South Africa) Retief Goosen	32 points	1 point	(United States) Brandt Jobe	900,000
2004	(Australia) Rod Pampling	31 points	2 points	(Germany) Alex Čejka	900,000
2003	(United States) Davis Love III (2)	46 points	12 points	(South Africa) Retief Goosen (Fiji) Vijay Singh	900,000
2002	(United States) Rich Beem	44 points	1 point	(United States) Steve Lowery	810,000
2001	(United States) Tom Pernice Jr.	34 points	1 point	(United States) Chris Riley	720,000
2000	(South Africa) Ernie Els	48 points	4 points	(United States) Phil Mickelson	630,000
Sprint International
1999	(United States) David Toms	47 points	3 points	(United States) David Duval	468,000
1998	(Fiji) Vijay Singh	47 points	6 points	(United States) Phil Mickelson (United States) Willie Wood	360,000
1997	(United States) Phil Mickelson (2)	48 points	7 points	(Australia) Stuart Appleby	306,000
1996	(United States) Clarence Rose	31 points	Playoff	(United States) Brad Faxon	288,000
1995	(United States) Lee Janzen	34 points	1 point	(South Africa) Ernie Els	270,000
1994	(United States) Steve Lowery	35 points	Playoff	(United States) Rick Fehr	252,000
The International
1993	(United States) Phil Mickelson	45 points	8 points	(United States) Mark Calcavecchia	234,000
1992	(United States) Brad Faxon	14 points	2 points	(United States) Lee Janzen	216,000
1991	(Spain) José María Olazábal	10 points	3 points	(Australia) Ian Baker-Finch (United States) Scott Gump (United States) Bob Lohr	198,000
1990	(United States) Davis Love III	14 points	3 points	(United States) Steve Pate (Argentina) Eduardo Romero (Australia) Peter Senior	180,000
1989	(United States) Greg Norman	13 points	2 points	(United States) Clarence Rose	180,000
1988	(United States) Joey Sindelar	17 points	4 points	(United States) Steve Pate (United States) Dan Pohl	180,000
1987	(United States) John Cook	11 points	2 points	(United States) Ken Green	180,000
1986	(United States) Ken Green	12 points	3 points	(Germany) Bernhard Langer	180,000
