= Haysville, Kansas =

City in Sedgwick County, Kansas

- City
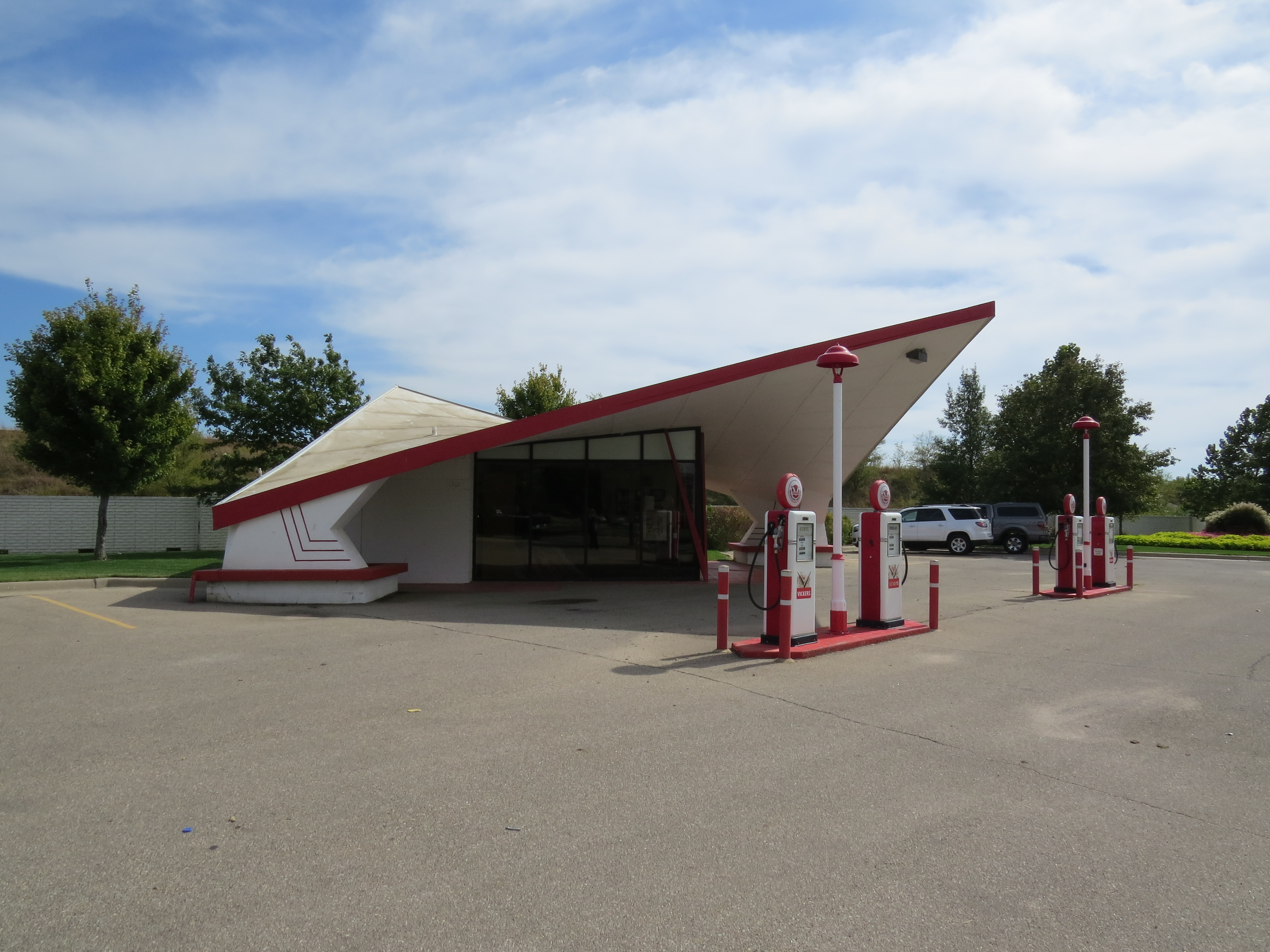
- Vickers Petroleum Service Station in 2016

- Flag

- Location within Sedgwick County and Kansas
- Interactive map of Haysville, Kansas
- Coordinates: 37°33′50″N 97°21′11″W
- Country: United States
- State: Kansas
- County: Sedgwick
- Founded: 1891
- Platted: 1891
- Incorporated: 1951
- Named for: W.W. Hays

Government
  - Type: Mayor–Council
  - Mayor: Russ Kessler

Area
  - Total: 4.66 sq mi (12.06 km^{2})
  - Land: 4.65 sq mi (12.04 km^{2})
  - Water: 0.012 sq mi (0.03 km^{2})
- Elevation: 1,260 ft (380 m)

Population (2020)
  - Total: 11,262
  - Density: 2,423/sq mi (935.4/km^{2})
- Time zone: UTC-6 (CST)
  - Summer (DST): UTC-5 (CDT)
- ZIP Code: 67060
- Area code: 316
- FIPS code: 20-31125
- GNIS ID: 481653
- Website: haysvilleks.gov

Haysville is a city in Sedgwick County, Kansas, United States, and a southern suburb of Wichita. As of the 2020 census, the population of the city was 11,262. Haysville was known as the "Peach Capital of Kansas".

== History ==
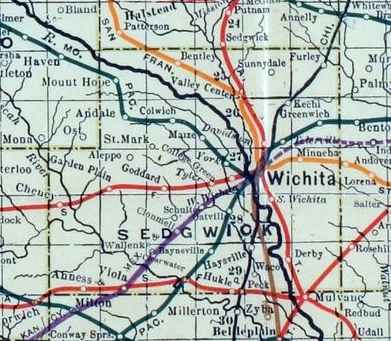
1915 railroad map of Sedgwick County

W.W. Hays came to this area in the early 1870s. In 1891, he platted land that he owned so a town could be built. The Haysville State Bank was established in 1919. Truck farming supported a lot of the families in the area. In 1874 a grist mill was built on the bank of the Cowskin to process corn that was harvested in the area. Haysville's first school was built in 1876 at a location that may have been near what are now the Water Department facilities.

In 1887, the Chicago, Kansas and Nebraska Railway Company built a branch line north–south from Herington through Haysville to Caldwell. It was renamed in 1891 to Chicago, Rock Island and Pacific Railway which shut down in 1980, renamed in 1980 to Oklahoma, Kansas and Texas Railroad, merged in 1988 to Missouri Pacific Railroad, merged in 1997 to the current Union Pacific Railroad. Most locals still refer to this railroad as the "Rock Island". In 1903, a depot was opened and passenger trains shuttled people to and from Wichita.

On May 3, 1999, a tornado rated F4 on the Fujita scale struck Haysville, killing four people. Damage to structures included 150 homes and 27 businesses. The tornado continued into Wichita causing damage to the south side of the city, killing an additional two people in Wichita. All of Haysville's historic district was destroyed. The only thing left standing on the east side of Main Street was the original bank vault.

== Geography ==
Haysville is located at 37°33′50″N 97°21′11″W (37.563787, -97.353044). According to the United States Census Bureau, the city has a total area of 4.62 square miles (11.97 km^{2}), of which 4.61 square miles (11.94 km^{2}) is land and 0.01 square miles (0.03 km^{2}) is water.

== Demographics ==
Historical population
Census	Pop.	Note	%±
1960	5,836		—
1970	6,531		11.9%
1980	8,006		22.6%
1990	8,364		4.5%
2000	8,502		1.6%
2010	10,826		27.3%
2020	11,262		4.0%
2023 (est.)	11,268		0.1%
U.S. Decennial Census; 2010-2020

Haysville is part of the Wichita, KS Metropolitan Statistical Area.

=== 2020 census ===
As of the 2020 census, Haysville had a population of 11,262, with 4,133 households and 2,988 families. The population density was 2,401.3 per square mile (927.1/km^{2}), and there were 4,371 housing units at an average density of 932.0 per square mile (359.8/km^{2}).

The median age was 34.8 years. 28.9% of residents were under the age of 18 and 14.4% were 65 years of age or older. For every 100 females, there were 93.9 males, and for every 100 females age 18 and over there were 91.3 males age 18 and over.

100.0% of residents lived in urban areas, while 0.0% lived in rural areas.

Of all households, 39.0% had children under the age of 18 living in them. Of all households, 49.5% were married-couple households, 16.5% were households with a male householder and no spouse or partner present, and 27.6% were households with a female householder and no spouse or partner present. About 23.4% of all households were made up of individuals, and 10.8% had someone living alone who was 65 years of age or older.

Of all housing units, 5.4% were vacant. The homeowner vacancy rate was 1.9% and the rental vacancy rate was 8.8%.

Racial composition as of the 2020 census
Race	Number	Percent
White	9,532	84.6%
Black or African American	111	1.0%
American Indian and Alaska Native	166	1.5%
Asian	153	1.4%
Native Hawaiian and Other Pacific Islander	9	0.1%
Some other race	196	1.7%
Two or more races	1,095	9.7%
Hispanic or Latino (of any race)	844	7.5%

=== 2016–2020 American Community Survey ===
The 2016–2020 5-year American Community Survey estimates show that the average household size was 2.6 and the average family size was 3.3. The percent of those with a bachelor's degree or higher was estimated to be 11.8% of the population.

The 2016–2020 5-year American Community Survey estimates show that the median household income was $54,982 (with a margin of error of +/- $7,358) and the median family income was $70,035 (+/- $10,246). Males had a median income of $42,998 (+/- $5,357) versus $27,050 (+/- $3,326) for females. The median income for those above 16 years old was $34,131 (+/- $5,149). Approximately, 3.4% of families and 10.0% of the population were below the poverty line, including 5.2% of those under the age of 18 and 21.9% of those ages 65 or over.

=== 2010 census ===
As of the census of 2010, there were 10,826 people, 3,857 households, and 2,932 families living in the city. The population density was 2,348.4 inhabitants per square mile (906.7/km^{2}). There were 4,087 housing units at an average density of 886.6 per square mile (342.3/km^{2}). The racial makeup of the city was 92.7% White, 0.6% African American, 1.2% Native American, 0.9% Asian, 1.2% from other races, and 3.5% from two or more races. Hispanic or Latino of any race were 4.6% of the population.

There were 3,857 households, of which 44.0% had children under the age of 18 living with them, 56.0% were married couples living together, 13.9% had a female householder with no husband present, 6.2% had a male householder with no wife present, and 24.0% were non-families. 20.7% of all households were made up of individuals, and 9.8% had someone living alone who was 65 years of age or older. The average household size was 2.78 and the average family size was 3.20.

The median age in the city was 32.8 years. 30.4% of residents were under the age of 18; 8.8% were between the ages of 18 and 24; 26.9% were from 25 to 44; 21.7% were from 45 to 64; and 12.1% were 65 years of age or older. The gender makeup of the city was 48.0% male and 52.0% female.

== Economics ==
- Norland Plastics

== Area events ==
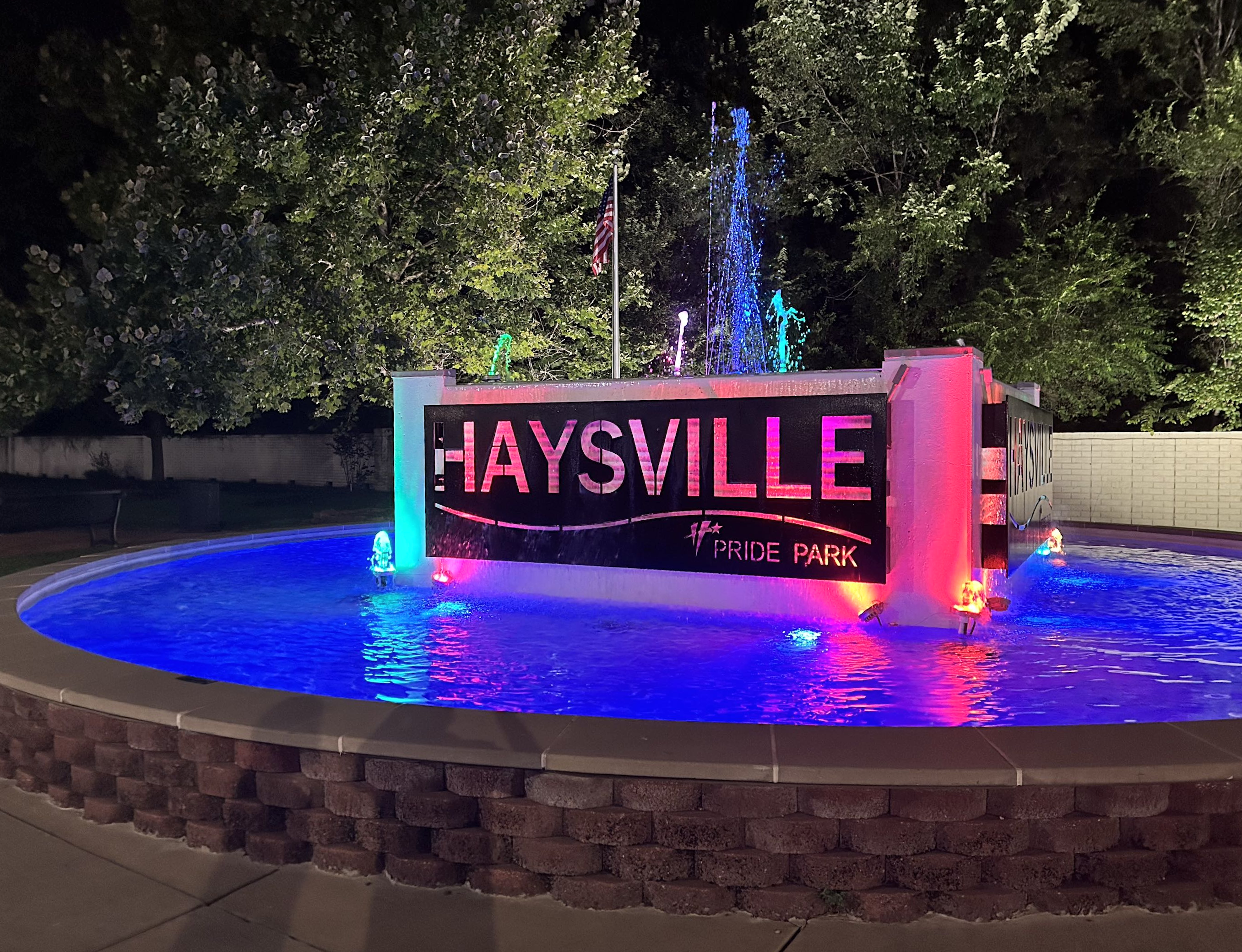
Fountain outside of Haysville PRIDE Park (2026)

- Haysville Fall Festival. The annual three-day event takes place in and around Riggs Park. The Fall Festival celebrates its 30th year on October 17–19 in 2014.
- Village Christmas. Each year in the beginning of December. Celebrated in the Historic District of Haysville. Hot cocoa, carriage rides, choir performances, Santa, and more.
- Community Expo is held in April at the Haysville Community Library or Haysville Activity Center (HAC).
- Springnanigans is a festival for kids held in May in the Haysville Historic District.
- Fourth of July Celebration is held in Riggs Park. Fireworks show in the evening.

== Government ==
The Haysville government consists of a mayor and eight council members. The council meets the 2nd Monday of each month at 7PM.

- City Hall, 200 W Grand.

== Education ==
Haysville is served by Haysville USD 261 public school district.

Public schools:

- Campus High School, located in Wichita, but serves as the High School of Haysville, Kansas USD 261.
- Haysville High School (formerly Haysville Alternative High School) also serves Haysville teens
- Haysville Middle School
- Haysville West Middle School
- Freeman Elementary
- Nelson Elementary
- Oatville Elementary
- Prairie Elementary
- Rex Elementary
- Ruth Clark Elementary
- Tri-City Day School

== Transportation ==
The Chicago, Rock Island and Pacific Railroad formerly provided passenger rail service to Haysville on their mainline from Minneapolis to Houston until at least 1951. As of 2025, the nearest passenger rail station is located in Newton, where Amtrak's Southwest Chief stops once daily on a route from Chicago to Los Angeles.

== See also ==
- April 26, 1991 tornado outbreak
