= National Register of Historic Places listings in Sedgwick County, Kansas =

Location of Sedgwick County in Kansas

This is a list of the National Register of Historic Places listings in Sedgwick County, Kansas.

This is intended to be a complete list of the properties and districts on the National Register of Historic Places in Sedgwick County, Kansas, United States. The locations of National Register properties and districts for which the latitude and longitude coordinates are included below, may be seen in a map.

There are 146 properties and districts listed on the National Register in the county. Three properties were once listed, but have since been removed.

This National Park Service list is complete through NPS recent listings posted October 23, 2026.

== Current listings ==
| | Name on the Register | Image | Date listed | Location | City or town | Description |
|---|---|---|---|---|---|---|
| 1 | Frank J. and Harvey J. Ablah House | Frank J. and Harvey J. Ablah House | April 21, 2009 (#09000276) | 102–104 N. Pinecrest Ave. 37°41′30″N 97°19′41″W | Wichita | part of the Residential Resources of Wichita, Sedgwick County, Kansas 1870–1957 Multiple Property Submission (MPS) |
| 2 | Adeline Apartment Building | Adeline Apartment Building | April 18, 2007 (#07000314) | 1403 N. Emporia; 37°42′36″N 97°20′00″W | Wichita | designed by Wichita builder Thomas C. Naylor and completed in 1923. This is an early example of a three story garden style apartment. Each floor has three 2-bedroom apartments, two 1-bedroom apartments and an efficiency apartment. Early tenants included a lawyer, oil broker, geologist, and lumberman, along with Thomas Naylor and his family. |
| 3 | Administration Building | Administration Building | June 11, 1990 (#90000908) | McConnell AFB; 37°37′55″N 97°16′23″W | Wichita | |
| 4 | Allen's Market | Allen's Market | November 21, 2006 (#06001050) | 2938 E. Douglas Ave. 37°41′09″N 97°18′07″W | Wichita | designed by Wichita architect Glen H. Thomas (1889–1962) and built in 1930 by Henrion Improvement Company. |
| 5 | Henry J. Allen House | Henry J. Allen House | March 7, 1973 (#73000775) | 255 N. Roosevelt St. 37°41′23″N 97°17′31″W | Wichita | designed in 1915 by Frank Lloyd Wright and built in 1917 for Henry J. Allen, newspaper owner and future Kansas governor and senator. The home is open to the public as the Frank Lloyd Wright Allen-Lambe House Museum. |
| 6 | Arkansas Valley Lodge No. 21, Prince Hall Masons | Arkansas Valley Lodge No. 21, Prince Hall Masons | August 24, 1977 (#77000596) | 615 N. Main St. 37°41′44″N 97°20′17″W | Wichita | Completed in 1910, the Black Masonic Hall is the last surviving commercial building of the Black business community which was located on North Main. Windstorm damage caused a third floor to be removed in 1948. |
| 7 | Ash-Grove Historic District on East Douglas Avenue | | April 5, 2016 (#16000135) | 2100–2330 E. Dougleas Ave. (evens); 114 & 117 N. Madison Ave., 111 N. Spruce St.; 115-117 N. Grove St. 37°41′11″N 97°18′38″W | Wichita | |
| 8 | Oscar D. and Ida Barnes House | | July 7, 2015 (#15000383) | 901 N. Broadway Ave. 37°41′57″N 97°20′08″W | Wichita | |
| 9 | Battin Apartments Historic District | | July 3, 2012 (#12000389) | 1700 S. Elpyco Ave. 37°39′45″N 97°16′38″W | Wichita | part of the Residential Resources of Wichita, Sedgwick County, Kansas 1870–1957 MPS |
| 10 | Belmont Arches | Belmont Arches | April 10, 2007 (#07000313) | Belmont junction of Central and Douglas; 37°41′44″N 97°17′11″W | Wichita | built in 1925, the Classic Revival limestone piers connected with wrought iron arches are located at the intersections of Belmont and Central and Belmont and Douglas. |
| 11 | Bitting Building | Bitting Building | February 28, 2012 (#12000046) | 107 N. Market St. 37°41′11″N 97°20′13″W | Wichita | |
| 12 | Bitting Historic District | Bitting Historic District | August 4, 2004 (#04000776) | Generally the 1100 and 1200 blocks of Bitting; 37°42′22″N 97°20′54″W | Wichita | |
| 13 | Frank E. Blaser House | Frank E. Blaser House | January 7, 2010 (#09001205) | 136 N. Crestway Ave. 37°41′14″N 97°17′06″W | Wichita | part of the Residential Resources of Wichita, Sedgwick County, Kansas 1870–1957 MPS |
| 14 | Bond-Sullivan House | Bond-Sullivan House | November 28, 2007 (#07001228) | 936 Back Bay Boulevard; 37°42′00″N 97°20′37″W | Wichita | |
| 15 | Bowers House | Bowers House | September 15, 2004 (#04000973) | 1004 North Market; 37°42′02″N 97°20′10″W | Wichita | |
| 16 | Broadview Hotel | Broadview Hotel | June 19, 2009 (#09000460) | 400 W. Douglas Ave. 37°41′11″N 97°20′34″W | Wichita | |
| 17 | Broom Corn Warehouse | Broom Corn Warehouse | June 28, 2011 (#11000394) | 416 S. Commerce; 37°40′56″N 97°19′51″W | Wichita | |
| 18 | Brown Building | Brown Building | October 10, 2007 (#07001069) | 105 S. Broadway St. 37°41′09″N 97°20′07″W | Wichita | |
| 19 | Buildings at 800 West Douglas Block | Buildings at 800 West Douglas Block | October 22, 2004 (#04001160) | 809, 811, and 815 W. Douglas; 37°41′01″N 97°20′59″W | Wichita | |
| 20 | J. Arch Butts Packard Building | J. Arch Butts Packard Building | July 5, 2011 (#11000410) | 1525 E. Douglas Ave. 37°41′10″N 97°19′07″W | Wichita | part of the Roadside Kansas MPS |
| 21 | Calvary Baptist Church | Calvary Baptist Church | October 28, 1988 (#88001905) | 601 N. Water; 37°41′40″N 97°20′27″W | Wichita | built between 1917 and 1920, one of only a few surviving structures of Wichita's early African American community. |
| 22 | B. H. Campbell House | B. H. Campbell House | April 13, 1973 (#73000776) | 1155 N. River Boulevard; 37°42′16″N 97°21′30″W | Wichita | |
| 23 | Carey House | Carey House | April 13, 1972 (#72000526) | 525 E. Douglas Ave. 37°41′09″N 97°19′53″W | Wichita | |
| 24 | Century II Performing Arts and Convention Center | Century II Performing Arts and Convention Center | October 2, 2020 (#100005627) | 225 West Douglas Ave. 37°41′06″N 97°20′25″W | Wichita | |
| 25 | Chapman-Noble House | Chapman-Noble House | November 1, 2006 (#06000962) | 1230 N. Waco; 37°42′27″N 97°20′30″W | Wichita | |
| 26 | L.W. Clapp House | L.W. Clapp House | June 14, 1982 (#82002668) | 1847 Wellington Pl. 37°43′00″N 97°20′22″W | Wichita | |
| 27 | R.D.W. Clapp House | R.D.W. Clapp House | December 20, 2006 (#06001173) | 320 N. Belmont; 37°41′34″N 97°17′09″W | Wichita | |
| 28 | College Hill Park Bathhouse | College Hill Park Bathhouse | April 16, 2008 (#08000305) | 304 S. Circle Dr. 37°40′55″N 97°17′35″W | Wichita | part of the New Deal-Era Resources of Kansas MPS |
| 29 | Comley House | Comley House | November 1, 2006 (#06000961) | 1137 N. Broadway; 37°42′20″N 97°20′09″W | Wichita | |
| 30 | Commodore Apartment Hotel | Commodore Apartment Hotel | May 1, 2013 (#13000218) | 222 E. Elm St. 601 N. Broadway Ave. 37°41′42″N 97°20′10″W | Wichita | |
| 31 | Corbin Education Center, Wichita State University | | August 21, 2025 (#100010890) | 1845 Fairmount Street; 37°43′00″N 97°17′48″W | Wichita | |
| 32 | E.S. Cowie Electric Company Buildings | E.S. Cowie Electric Company Buildings | July 8, 2019 (#100001706) | 222, 226, 230, 232 S. Topeka St. 37°41′02″N 97°20′03″W | Wichita | |
| 33 | Cudahy Packing Plant | Cudahy Packing Plant | September 17, 2012 (#12000390) | 2300 N. Broadway St. 37°43′31″N 97°20′00″W | Wichita | |
| 34 | Dawson Farmstead | | November 27, 2024 (#100011119) | 9801 N Broadway St & 200 W 93rd St N. 37°51′23″N 97°20′12″W | Valley Center | |
| 35 | Derby Public School-District 6 | | October 8, 2014 (#14000832) | 716 E. Market St. 37°32′40″N 97°15′47″W | Derby | |
| 36 | Dunbar Theatre | Dunbar Theatre | July 2, 2008 (#08000615) | 1007 N. Cleveland Ave. 37°42′04″N 97°19′20″W | Wichita | part of the Theaters and Opera Houses of Kansas MPS |
| 37 | Eagle's Lodge #132 | Eagle's Lodge #132 | January 31, 2008 (#07001484) | 200-202 S. Emporia; 37°41′12″N 97°19′58″W | Wichita | |
| 38 | East Douglas Avenue Historic District | East Douglas Avenue Historic District | August 4, 2004 (#04000777) | Roughly bounded by Topeka, Rock Island, 1st, and English Sts. 37°41′14″N 97°19′51″W | Wichita | |
| 39 | Eastwood Plaza Apartments | Eastwood Plaza Apartments | March 7, 2019 (#100003429) | 4802-4850 & 4850-4835 E. Eastwood. 616-626 S. Oliver Ave. 37°40′35″N 97°16′46″W | Wichita | The Eastwood Plaza Apartments were built in 1951 and consist of 6 free-standing asymmetrical mid-century modern style brick buildings. They are located at South Oliver Avenue and Eastwood Street, just south of Kellogg. Designed by architect Frank McAleavy and constructed by National Builders Inc., both of Wichita, they were financed by the Federal Housing Administration (FHA), and intended for returning World War II veterans and for workers in Wichita's airplane industry. |
| 40 | Ellis-Singleton Building | Ellis-Singleton Building | May 11, 2006 (#06000389) | 221 S. Broadway; 37°41′03″N 97°20′08″W | Wichita | |
| 41 | Engine House No. 6 | Engine House No. 6 | February 2, 1995 (#94001623) | 1300 S. Broadway; 37°40′11″N 97°20′06″W | Wichita | |
| 42 | Fairmount Apartments | Fairmount Apartments | December 30, 2009 (#09001167) | 1702 N. Fairmount Ave. 37°42′50″N 97°17′46″W | Wichita | part of the Residential Resources of Wichita, Sedgwick County, Kansas 1870–1957 MPS |
| 43 | Fairmount Congregational Church | Fairmount Congregational Church | November 1, 2006 (#06000963) | 1650 N. Fairmount; 37°42′55″N 97°17′48″W | Wichita | |
| 44 | Fairmount Cottage | Fairmount Cottage | September 5, 1985 (#85001979) | 1717 Fairmount Ave. 37°42′51″N 97°17′46″W | Wichita | |
| 45 | Fairview Apartments | Fairview Apartments | December 30, 2009 (#09001168) | 206 E. 18th St. 37°43′03″N 97°20′11″W | Wichita | part of the Residential Resources of Wichita, Sedgwick County, Kansas 1870–1957 MPS |
| 46 | J.E. Farmer House | J.E. Farmer House | June 28, 2011 (#11000395) | 1301 Cleveland St. 37°42′23″N 97°19′19″W | Wichita | part of the African American Resources in Wichita, Kansas MPS |
| 47 | Farmer's and Banker's Historic District | Farmer's and Banker's Historic District | October 10, 2007 (#07001070) | 1st and Market Sts. 37°41′16″N 97°20′13″W | Wichita | |
| 48 | Fourth National Bank Building | Fourth National Bank Building | May 1, 2013 (#13000219) | 100–110 N. Market St. 37°41′11″N 97°20′12″W | Wichita | |
| 49 | Fresh Air Baby Camp | Fresh Air Baby Camp | November 28, 2007 (#07001229) | 1229 W. 11th St. 37°42′15″N 97°21′08″W | Wichita | |
| 50 | Garvey Center | Garvey Center | April 2, 2021 (#100006328) | 200-220-250-300 West Douglas Ave. 37°41′13″N 97°20′25″W | Wichita | |
| 51 | Gelbach House | Gelbach House | May 22, 2002 (#02000545) | 1721 Park Place; 37°42′52″N 97°20′18″W | Wichita | |
| 52 | Grace Methodist Episcopal Church | Grace Methodist Episcopal Church | July 12, 2006 (#06000599) | 944 S. Topeka; 37°40′30″N 97°20′00″W | Wichita | |
| 53 | Grandview Terrace Apartments | | April 5, 2016 (#16000134) | 1736–48 N. Hillside; 37°42′54″N 97°17′56″W | Wichita | |
| 54 | Guldner House | Guldner House | January 7, 2010 (#09001206) | 1919 W. Douglas; 37°41′01″N 97°21′50″W | Wichita | part of the Residential Resources of Wichita, Sedgwick County, Kansas 1870–1957 MPS |
| 55 | Hayford Buildings | Hayford Buildings | November 2, 1982 (#82000420) | 255 N. Market and 115-127 E. 2nd Sts. 37°41′22″N 97°20′09″W | Wichita | |
| 56 | Henry's Department Store | Henry's Department Store | February 3, 2020 (#100004921) | 124 South Broadway St. 37°41′07″N 97°20′08″W | Wichita | |
| 57 | Hillside Cottage | Hillside Cottage | November 21, 1976 (#76000839) | 303 Circle Dr. 37°40′59″N 97°17′36″W | Wichita | |
| 58 | Holyoke Cottage | Holyoke Cottage | November 28, 2007 (#07001230) | 1704 N. Holyoke; 37°42′50″N 97°17′50″W | Wichita | |
| 59 | Hypatia House | Hypatia House | August 23, 1991 (#91001105) | 1215 N. Broadway; 37°42′25″N 97°20′08″W | Wichita | |
| 60 | Innes Department Store | Innes Department Store | September 30, 2019 (#100004454) | 220-230 E. William St. 37°41′06″N 97°20′10″W | Wichita | |
| 61 | Interdale Apartments | | August 18, 2025 (#100012138) | 916-924 North Broadway Avenue; 37°41′58″N 97°20′08″W | Wichita | |
| 62 | International Harvester Building | International Harvester Building | January 15, 2003 (#02001702) | 355 N. Rock Island Ave/803-811 E. Third St. 37°41′29″N 97°19′42″W | Wichita | Now the Historic 1910 Lofts |
| 63 | C. M. Jackman House | C. M. Jackman House | October 10, 2007 (#07001071) | 158 N. Roosevelt; 37°41′17″N 97°17′29″W | Wichita | |
| 64 | Johnson Drug Store Building | Johnson Drug Store Building | April 4, 2007 (#07000254) | 2329 E. Central; 37°41′43″N 97°18′30″W | Wichita | |
| 65 | Kansas Gas & Electric Company Building | Kansas Gas & Electric Company Building | March 7, 2012 (#12000064) | 120 E. 1st St. 37°41′18″N 97°20′14″W | Wichita | |
| 66 | Keep Klean Building | Keep Klean Building | April 4, 2007 (#07000252) | 810 E. Third; 37°41′24″N 97°19′41″W | Wichita | |
| 67 | Kellogg Elementary School | Kellogg Elementary School | January 18, 2011 (#10001141) | 1220 E. Kellogg Dr. 37°40′45″N 97°19′23″W | Wichita | part of the Public Schools of Kansas MPS |
| 68 | Edward M. Kelly House | Edward M. Kelly House | July 11, 2002 (#02000763) | 1711 N. Market St. 37°42′50″N 97°20′12″W | Wichita | |
| 69 | Knightley's Parking Garage | Knightley's Parking Garage | October 11, 2016 (#16000707) | 303 S. Broadway; 37°41′01″N 97°20′08″W | Wichita | |
| 70 | S. H. Kress Company Building | S. H. Kress Company Building | June 24, 1985 (#85001385) | 224 E. Douglas; 37°41′11″N 97°20′08″W | Wichita | |
| 71 | Lassen Hotel | Lassen Hotel | October 4, 1984 (#84000108) | Market Ave. and 1st St. 37°41′16″N 97°20′13″W | Wichita | |
| 72 | Governor L. D. Lewelling House | Governor L. D. Lewelling House | June 8, 2005 (#05000547) | 1245 N. Broadway; 37°42′20″N 97°20′08″W | Wichita | |
| 73 | Linwood Park Greenhouse and Maintenance Building | Linwood Park Greenhouse and Maintenance Building | April 16, 2008 (#08000306) | 1700 S. Hydraulic St. 37°39′44″N 97°18′57″W | Wichita | part of the New Deal-Era Resources of Kansas MPS |
| 74 | Linwood Place Historic District | | December 3, 2013 (#13000881) | Roughly S. Hydraulic, S. Kansas, S. Minneapolis, & S. Minnesota Aves., Stafford Ct., E. Hodson St. 37°39′16″N 97°18′55″W | Wichita | Residential Resources of Wichita, Sedgwick County, Kansas 1870–1957 MPS. The district is a 40-acre property northwest of Wichita's aircraft related industrial district. It consists of Linwood Place Addition and Darrah's First Addition platted in 1943 and 1949, respectively. The homes are primarily fourplex multi-family residences designed for the workers in the aircraft industry. |
| 75 | Chester I. Long House | Chester I. Long House | July 10, 1978 (#78001289) | 3401 E. 2nd St. 37°41′26″N 97°17′45″W | Wichita | |
| 76 | Luling's City Laundry | Luling's City Laundry | February 3, 2012 (#11001081) | 1730–46 E. Douglas Ave. 37°41′11″N 97°18′57″W | Wichita | |
| 77 | John Mack Bridge | John Mack Bridge | January 22, 1992 (#91002018) | S. Broadway across the Big Arkansas River; 37°38′41″N 97°20′07″W | Wichita | part of the Rainbow Arch Marsh Arch Bridges of Kansas Thematic Resource (TR) |
| 78 | Marjoy Apartments | | December 19, 2025 (#100012446) | 1240 South Market Street; 37°40′13″N 97°20′12″W | Wichita | |
| 79 | Market Street Cottage | Market Street Cottage | April 18, 2007 (#07000315) | 1144 N. Market St. 37°42′22″N 97°21′32″W | Wichita | |
| 80 | McAfee Pool Complex | | August 18, 2025 (#100012139) | 1329 E. 16th Street; 37°42′41″N 97°19′23″W | Wichita | |
| 81 | McCormick School | McCormick School | August 30, 1978 (#78001288) | 855 S. Martinson; 37°40′25″N 97°21′23″W | Wichita | |
| 82 | McCormick-Armstrong Press Building | | October 2, 2020 (#100005628) | 1501 East Douglas Ave. 37°41′10″N 97°19′10″W | Wichita | |
| 83 | Elizabeth McLean House | Elizabeth McLean House | June 19, 2009 (#09000461) | 2359 N. McLean Boulevard; 37°43′32″N 97°23′02″W | Wichita | part of the Residential Resources of Wichita, Sedgwick County, Kansas 1870–1957 MPS |
| 84 | Mentholatum Company Building | Mentholatum Company Building | July 11, 2006 (#06000625) | 1300 E. Douglas; 37°41′11″N 97°19′16″W | Wichita | designed by Wichita architect U. G. Charles and built by the Wurster Construction Company in 1908. It is associated with the founder of Mentholatum, A. A. Hyde. |
| 85 | Minisa Bridge | | February 17, 2026 (#100012717) | West 13th Street N. over the Little Arkansas River; 37°42′29″N 97°20′46″W | Wichita | |
| 86 | Mohr Barn | Mohr Barn | December 20, 2006 (#06001170) | 14920 W. 21st St. N. 37°43′27″N 97°30′50″W | Wichita | |
| 87 | Monroe-Mahan House | Monroe-Mahan House | June 7, 1996 (#96000583) | 1357 S. Broadway; 37°40′07″N 97°20′07″W | Wichita | |
| 88 | Mullen Court Apartments | Mullen Court Apartments | January 17, 2007 (#06001243) | 1140–50 N. Topeka Ave. 37°42′21″N 97°20′03″W | Wichita | |
| 89 | Darius Sales Munger House | Darius Sales Munger House | June 14, 1982 (#82002669) | Old Cowtown Museum; 37°41′39″N 97°21′41″W | Wichita | Originally was located at 901 Waco St, moved 3 times, final time to Old Cowtown Museum |
| 90 | Newbern-Gore House | Newbern-Gore House | September 2, 2009 (#09000675) | 400 South Roosevelt; 37°40′50″N 97°19′29″W | Wichita | part of the Residential Resources of Wichita, Sedgwick County, Kansas 1870–1957 MPS |
| 91 | Nokomis and Navarre Apartment Buildings | Nokomis and Navarre Apartment Buildings | March 12, 2001 (#01000234) | 420–426 N. Topeka Ave. 37°41′32″N 97°20′02″W | Wichita | |
| 92 | North Market Street Apartments Historic District | North Market Street Apartments Historic District | August 12, 2010 (#10000548) | 718, 722, and 730 N. Market St. 37°41′49″N 97°20′11″W | Wichita | part of the Residential Resources of Wichita, Sedgwick County, Kansas 1870–1957 MPS |
| 93 | North Riverside Park Comfort Station | North Riverside Park Comfort Station | April 16, 2008 (#08000307) | 900 N. Bitting Ave. 37°42′08″N 97°21′00″W | Wichita | part of the New Deal-Era Resources of Kansas MPS |
| 94 | North Topeka Avenue-10th Street Historic District | North Topeka Avenue-10th Street Historic District | February 14, 1983 (#83000438) | 1165, 1103, 1109, 1113, and 1108 N. Topeka Ave. 37°42′11″N 97°19′59″W | Wichita | Boundary decrease approved March 26, 2018. |
| 95 | North Topeka Avenue Apartments Historic District | | April 21, 2009 (#09000277) | 625, 630, 631, and 632 N. Topeka Ave. 37°41′45″N 97°20′03″W | Wichita | part of the Residential Resources of Wichita, Sedgwick County, Kansas 1870–1957 MPS |
| 96 | Occidental Hotel | Occidental Hotel | June 14, 1982 (#82002670) | 300 N. Main St. 37°41′18″N 97°20′14″W | Wichita | |
| 97 | Old Mission Mausoleum | Old Mission Mausoleum | May 28, 2009 (#09000352) | 3414 E. 21st St. 37°43′22″N 97°17′43″W | Wichita | |
| 98 | Old Sedgwick County Courthouse | Old Sedgwick County Courthouse | May 14, 1971 (#71000327) | 504 N. Main St. 37°41′38″N 97°20′13″W | Wichita | |
| 99 | Old Wheeler-Kelly-Hagny Building | | March 11, 1982 (#82002671) | 120 S. Market St. 37°41′08″N 97°20′11″W | Wichita | |
| 100 | Orpheum Theater and Office Building | Orpheum Theater and Office Building | November 28, 1980 (#80001473) | 200 N. Broadway St. 37°41′11″N 97°20′05″W | Wichita | |
| 101 | Park Place-Fairview Historic District | | August 4, 2004 (#04000778) | Roughly Park Place and Fairview Aves. between 13th and 17th Sts. and Wellington Place; 37°42′53″N 97°20′22″W | Wichita | |
| 102 | Penley House | Penley House | November 4, 2009 (#09000877) | 3400 Penley Dr. 37°40′10″N 97°17′48″W | Wichita | part of the Residential Resources of Wichita, Sedgwick County, Kansas 1870–1957 MPS |
| 103 | Powell House | Powell House | November 4, 2009 (#09000676) | 330 N. Crestway; 37°41′27″N 97°17′06″W | Wichita | part of the Residential Resources of Wichita, Sedgwick County, Kansas 1870–1957 MPS |
| 104 | Price Elementary School | | April 4, 2025 (#100011705) | 6123 E. 11th Street North; 37°42′20″N 97°15′48″W | Wichita | |
| 105 | Pryor House | Pryor House | July 8, 2009 (#09000499) | 263 S. Pershing; 37°40′56″N 97°16′59″W | Wichita | part of the Residential Resources of Wichita, Sedgwick County, Kansas 1870–1957 MPS |
| 106 | Riverside Cottage | Riverside Cottage | February 23, 1989 (#88002824) | 901 Spaulding Ave. 37°41′58″N 97°21′12″W | Wichita | |
| 107 | Riverview Apartments | Riverview Apartments | July 11, 2002 (#02000765) | 404-408 Back Bay Boulevard; 37°41′56″N 97°20′32″W | Wichita | |
| 108 | Roberts House | Roberts House | April 16, 2008 (#08000308) | 235 N. Roosevelt St. 37°41′22″N 97°17′33″W | Wichita | |
| 109 | Rock Island Depot | Rock Island Depot | April 23, 1973 (#73000777) | 729 E. Douglas St. 37°40′36″N 97°19′44″W | Wichita | |
| 110 | St. James Episcopal Church | | February 3, 2020 (#100004922) | 3750 East Douglas Ave. 37°41′11″N 97°17′34″W | Wichita | |
| 111 | St. Mark Church | St. Mark Church | May 1, 1991 (#91000463) | 19230 W. 29th St., N. 37°44′11″N 97°33′49″W | St. Marks | |
| 112 | Scottish Rite Temple | Scottish Rite Temple | May 5, 1972 (#72000527) | Northwestern corner of 1st St. at Topeka; 37°41′18″N 97°20′03″W | Wichita | |
| 113 | Sedgwick County Memorial Hall and Soldiers and Sailors Monument | Sedgwick County Memorial Hall and Soldiers and Sailors Monument | November 20, 1998 (#98001359) | 510 N. Main; 37°41′38″N 97°20′15″W | Wichita | |
| 114 | Sim Park Golf Course Tee Shelters | Sim Park Golf Course Tee Shelters | April 16, 2008 (#08000309) | 2020 W. Murdock St. 37°41′52″N 97°21′48″W | Wichita | part of the New Deal-Era Resources of Kansas MPS |
| 115 | Smyser House | Smyser House | May 21, 2009 (#09000353) | 931 Buffum Ave. 37°42′00″N 97°21′16″W | Wichita | part of the Residential Resources of Wichita, Sedgwick County, Kansas 1870–1957 MPS |
| 116 | South Kansas Avenue Historic District | South Kansas Avenue Historic District | March 26, 2020 (#100005117) | 220-224 South Kansas Ave. 37°41′01″N 97°18′58″W | Wichita | |
| 117 | Stackman Court Apartments | Stackman Court Apartments | November 29, 1991 (#91001741) | 1207 Franklin Ave. 37°42′29″N 97°21′09″W | Wichita | |
| 118 | William Sternberg House | William Sternberg House | May 24, 1989 (#89000387) | 1065 N. Waco; 37°42′06″N 97°20′35″W | Wichita | |
| 119 | Stoner Apartment Building | Stoner Apartment Building | April 4, 2007 (#07000253) | 938-940 North Market; 37°42′00″N 97°20′10″W | Wichita | |
| 120 | Sunnyside School | Sunnyside School | January 18, 2011 (#10001143) | 3003 E. Kellogg St. 37°40′44″N 97°18′05″W | Wichita | part of the Public Schools of Kansas MPS |
| 121 | Sutton Place | | February 3, 2020 (#100004920) | 209 East William St. 37°41′06″N 97°20′12″W | Wichita | |
| 122 | Topeka–Emporia Historic District | | August 4, 2004 (#04000779) | Roughly N. Topeka and Emporia Aves. between 10th and 13th Sts. 37°42′27″N 97°20′01″W | Wichita | |
| 123 | Union National Bank Building | Union National Bank Building | February 3, 2012 (#11001082) | 104 S. Broadway St. 37°41′09″N 97°20′07″W | Wichita | |
| 124 | University Hall, Friends University | University Hall, Friends University | February 24, 1971 (#71000328) | 2100 University Ave. 37°40′41″N 97°21′57″W | Wichita | Formerly Garfield University, in 1898 the then unoccupied building and surrounding lots was purchased by James M. Davis, a St. Louis businessman, who offered the property to the Kansas Society of Friends. Friends University opened its doors in September of 1898. The first fall enrollment was 52 students. |
| 125 | US Post Office and Federal Building-Wichita | US Post Office and Federal Building-Wichita | July 18, 1989 (#89000792) | 401 N. Market; 37°41′30″N 97°20′18″W | Wichita | |
| 126 | W.O. Van Arsdale House | | July 8, 2009 (#09000500) | 201 N. Broadview; 37°41′17″N 97°20′08″W | Wichita | part of the Residential Resources of Wichita, Sedgwick County, Kansas 1870–1957 MPS |
| 127 | Vickers Petroleum Service Station | Vickers Petroleum Service Station | September 30, 2019 (#100004455) | 140 N. Main St. 37°33′55″N 97°21′08″W | Haysville | |
| 128 | Victor Court Apartments | Victor Court Apartments | June 27, 2014 (#14000350) | 140 N. Hydraulic Ave. 37°41′15″N 97°19′00″W | Wichita | |
| 129 | Virginia Apartment Building | | March 12, 2001 (#01000233) | 401-405 E. Third St. 37°41′28″N 97°20′02″W | Wichita | |
| 130 | Judge T. B. Wall House | Judge T. B. Wall House | August 11, 1983 (#83000439) | 622 N. St. Francis Ave; 37°41′48″N 97°19′52″W | Wichita | |
| 131 | Western Union Building | | September 14, 2018 (#100002971) | 154 N Topeka Ave. 37°41′16″N 97°20′03″W | Wichita | |
| 132 | Westside IOOF Lodge | | May 1, 2013 (#13000220) | 928–930 W. Douglas Ave. 37°41′03″N 97°21′06″W | Wichita | |
| 133 | Wichita City Carnegie Library Building | Wichita City Carnegie Library Building | June 25, 1987 (#87000971) | 220 S. Main; 37°41′14″N 97°20′21″W | Wichita | part of the Carnegie Libraries of Kansas TR |
| 134 | Wichita City Hall | Wichita City Hall | May 14, 1971 (#71000329) | 204 S. Main St. 37°41′05″N 97°20′15″W | Wichita | |
| 135 | Wichita High School | Wichita High School | October 8, 2009 (#09000811) | 324 N. Emporia; 37°41′28″N 97°19′57″W | Wichita | part of the Public Schools of Kansas MPS |
| 136 | Wichita Historic Warehouse and Jobbers District | | November 21, 2003 (#03001172) | Bounded by the elevated railroad tracks, Douglas and Washington Aves. and 2nd St. 37°41′14″N 97°19′35″W | Wichita | |
| 137 | Wichita Public Library-Main Branch | Wichita Public Library-Main Branch | February 2020 (#100005629) | 223 South Main St. 37°41′04″N 97°20′18″W | Wichita | |
| 138 | Wichita Veterans Administration Hospital | Wichita Veterans Administration Hospital | May 24, 2012 (#12000303) | 5500 E. Kellogg Ave. 37°40′52″N 97°16′26″W | Wichita | part of the United States Second Generation Veterans Hospitals MPS |
| 139 | Wichita Wholesale Grocery Company | Wichita Wholesale Grocery Company | August 11, 1983 (#83000440) | 619 E. William St. 37°41′05″N 97°19′49″W | Wichita | |
| 140 | Grace Wilkie House | Grace Wilkie House | May 6, 2009 (#09000278) | 4230 E. English St. 37°41′03″N 97°17′09″W | Wichita | |
| 141 | Wilson-Boyle House | Wilson-Boyle House | April 15, 2011 (#11000194) | 225 N. Roosevelt St. 37°41′21″N 97°17′33″W | Wichita | part of the Residential Resources of Wichita, Sedgwick County, Kansas 1870–1957 MPS |
| 142 | Fred D. Wilson House | Fred D. Wilson House | July 6, 2010 (#10000428) | 205 North Pershing; 37°41′18″N 97°16′58″W | Wichita | Architect and builder John C. Neely, Jr. built this Prairie-style house in 1929 in the College Hill neighborhood for Fred D. Wilson, banker and real estate developer. |
| 143 | Winders Historic District | | July 8, 2009 (#09000498) | 1038–1040, 1044, and 1045 S. Topeka Ave. 37°40′25″N 97°20′03″W | Wichita | part of the Residential Resources of Wichita, Sedgwick County, Kansas 1870–1957 MPS |
| 144 | Woodburn House | | September 2, 2009 (#09000677) | 547 North Brookfield; 37°41′43″N 97°15′21″W | Wichita | part of the Residential Resources of Wichita, Sedgwick County, Kansas 1870–1957 MPS |
| 145 | Woolf Brothers Clothing Company | Woolf Brothers Clothing Company | May 1, 2013 (#13000221) | 135 E. Douglas Ave. 37°41′09″N 97°20′14″W | Wichita | |
| 146 | Yucca Mentholatum Company Building | | October 27, 2026 (#100013552) | 1211 East Douglas Avenue; 37°41′10″N 97°19′24″W | Wichita | |

== Former listings ==
| | Name on the Register | Image | Date listed | Date removed | Location | City or town | Description |
|---|---|---|---|---|---|---|---|
| 1 | Ellington Apartment Building | | June 25, 2013 (#13000435) | July 10, 2017 | 514 S. Main Street; 37°40′50″N 97°20′16″W | Wichita | |
| 2 | McClinton Market | McClinton Market | June 28, 2011 (#11000396) | July 7, 2015 | 1205 East 12th, N. 37°42′22″N 97°19′27″W | Wichita | part of the African American Resources in Wichita, Kansas MPS |
| 3 | Naomi & Leona Apartment Buildings | Naomi & Leona Apartment Buildings | June 25, 2013 (#13000436) | July 10, 2017 | 507-509 South Market Street; 37°40′51″N 97°20′14″W | Wichita | |

== See also ==
- List of National Historic Landmarks in Kansas
- National Register of Historic Places listings in Kansas
