= Old Town District =

Historic district in Wichita, Kansas

Old Town
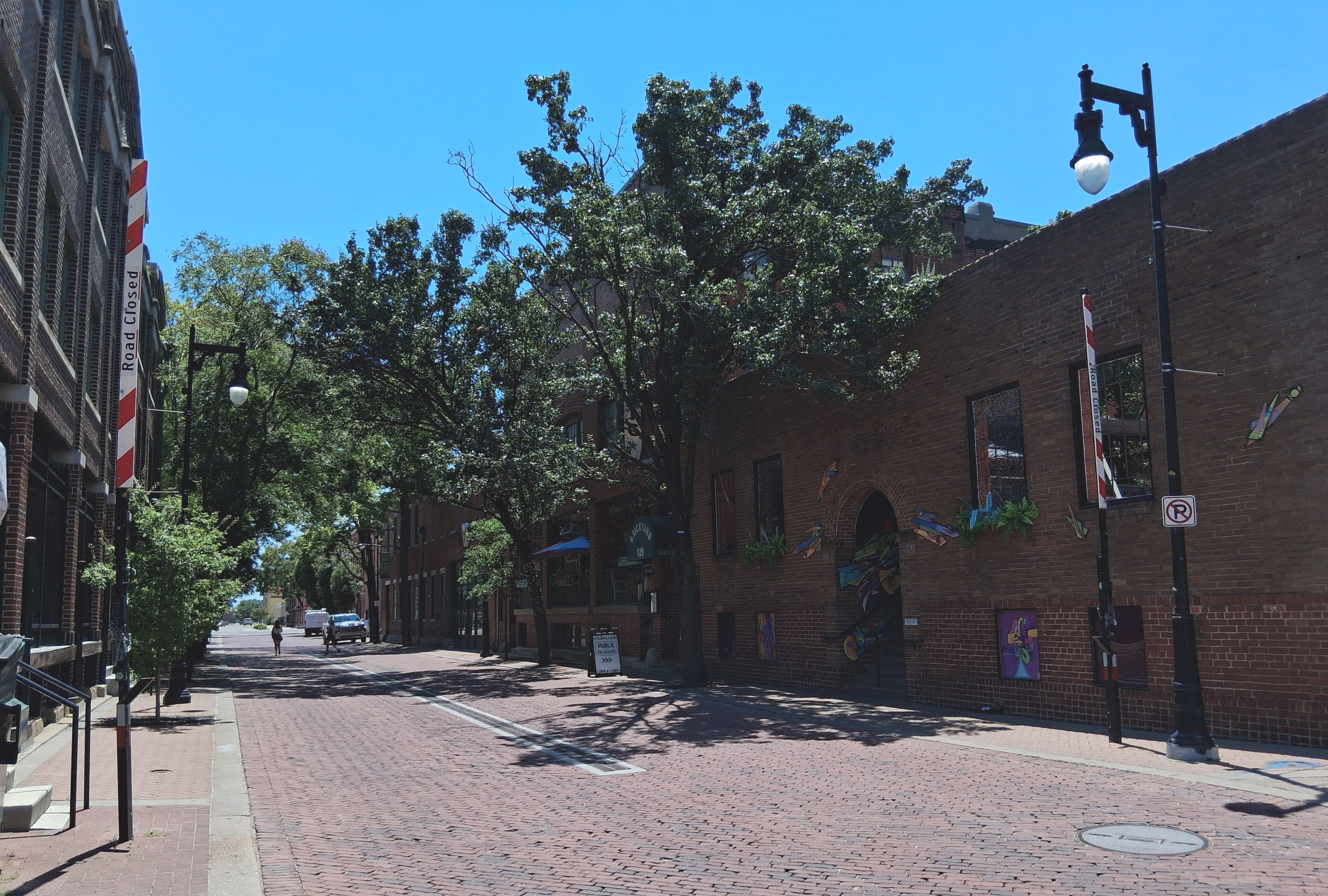
- North Rock Island Avenue in Old Town in 2026
- Interactive map of Old Town
- Address: 353 N. Mead Street
- Location: Downtown Wichita, Kansas; Centered near 2nd Street & Mosley Street
- Coordinates: 37°41′19″N 97°20′02″W
- Owner: Multiple private owners; coordinated by City of Wichita & Old Town Association
- Capacity: Roughly four-block historic warehouse area (~50 acres)
- Type: Mixed-use historic warehouse, retail, entertainment, office, and residential district
- Public transit: Wichita Transit

Construction
- Built: 1870s–1920s (original warehouses); Redeveloped beginning in 1980s
- Opened: Major redevelopment efforts launched in late 1980s; Old Town Overlay District adopted 1991

Website
- https://oldtownwichita.com/

Old Town is a historic mixed-use district in Downtown Wichita, Kansas, United States. Developed through a series of public–private partnerships beginning in the 1980s, the district encompasses roughly 50 acres of late 19th- and early 20th-century brick warehouses that have been rehabilitated for restaurants, shops, offices, galleries, hotels, and residential lofts. Old Town is located immediately east of the core of downtown Wichita, centered on the intersection of 2nd and Mosley Streets, with its boundaries generally defined by Douglas Avenue to the south, Washington Avenue to the east, and railroad lines to the north and west.

The district’s redevelopment was guided by the 1983 Old Town Development Plan and the 1991 Old Town Overlay District, which allowed mixed residential and commercial uses in what had been an industrial zone. Major anchors include the Hotel at Old Town in the restored Keen Kutter Building, the Eaton Place mixed-use redevelopment, the Museum of World Treasures, and Old Town Square, a public plaza used for concerts and events.

Old Town has been recognized nationally as a model of urban revitalization and adaptive reuse. In 2008, the American Planning Association named it one of the “Great Places in America” for its historic preservation and collaborative planning efforts. The district continues to serve as one of Wichita’s primary cultural and entertainment destinations, drawing both residents and visitors to its nightlife, restaurants, and community events.

== Location ==
Old Town is in downtown Wichita. Its approximate boundaries include railroad lines, Douglas Avenue, Mosley, and surrounding blocks initially comprising the warehouse district. It is part of the broader Downtown Wichita area.

== History ==
The district originated in the 1870s as Wichita’s warehouse and light industrial area, serving rail lines including the Atchison, Topeka & Santa Fe and the Frisco. By the mid-20th century, as rail traffic declined and industrial uses shifted toward the city’s periphery, many of the area’s warehouses were vacant or underused, with vacancy rates reaching as high as 70 percent.

In the 1970s, community leaders, business groups, and residents began exploring revitalization strategies. This culminated in the 1983 Old Town Development Plan, which addressed design, marketing, funding, parking, and redevelopment opportunities. In 1991, the city adopted the Old Town Overlay District, which permitted residential uses in what had previously been limited industrial zones and established design guidelines to preserve the district’s historic character.

The area also underwent environmental cleanup through a Tax Increment Financing (TIF) district, created to manage groundwater contamination without reliance on the federal Superfund program.

Following these measures, rehabilitation and adaptive reuse projects accelerated. Notable examples include the repurposing of the Keen Kutter Building as the Hotel at Old Town, the redevelopment of Eaton Place into a mixed-use complex, and the creation of Old Town Square, a public plaza used for concerts and events. Streetscape improvements such as new sidewalks, lighting, and parking infrastructure further reinforced the district’s transformation.

A distinctive feature of Old Town is its network of original brick streets, laid in the late 19th and early 20th centuries. Many of these streets were rehabilitated during the district’s redevelopment in the 1990s and remain a defining element of its historic character.

Redevelopment momentum extended to adjacent areas, most notably the restoration of Union Station, located just southwest of Old Town. Beginning in the mid-2010s, the historic rail terminal and its surrounding complex were renovated for office, retail, and dining uses, complementing the adaptive reuse efforts within the Old Town core.

== Features ==
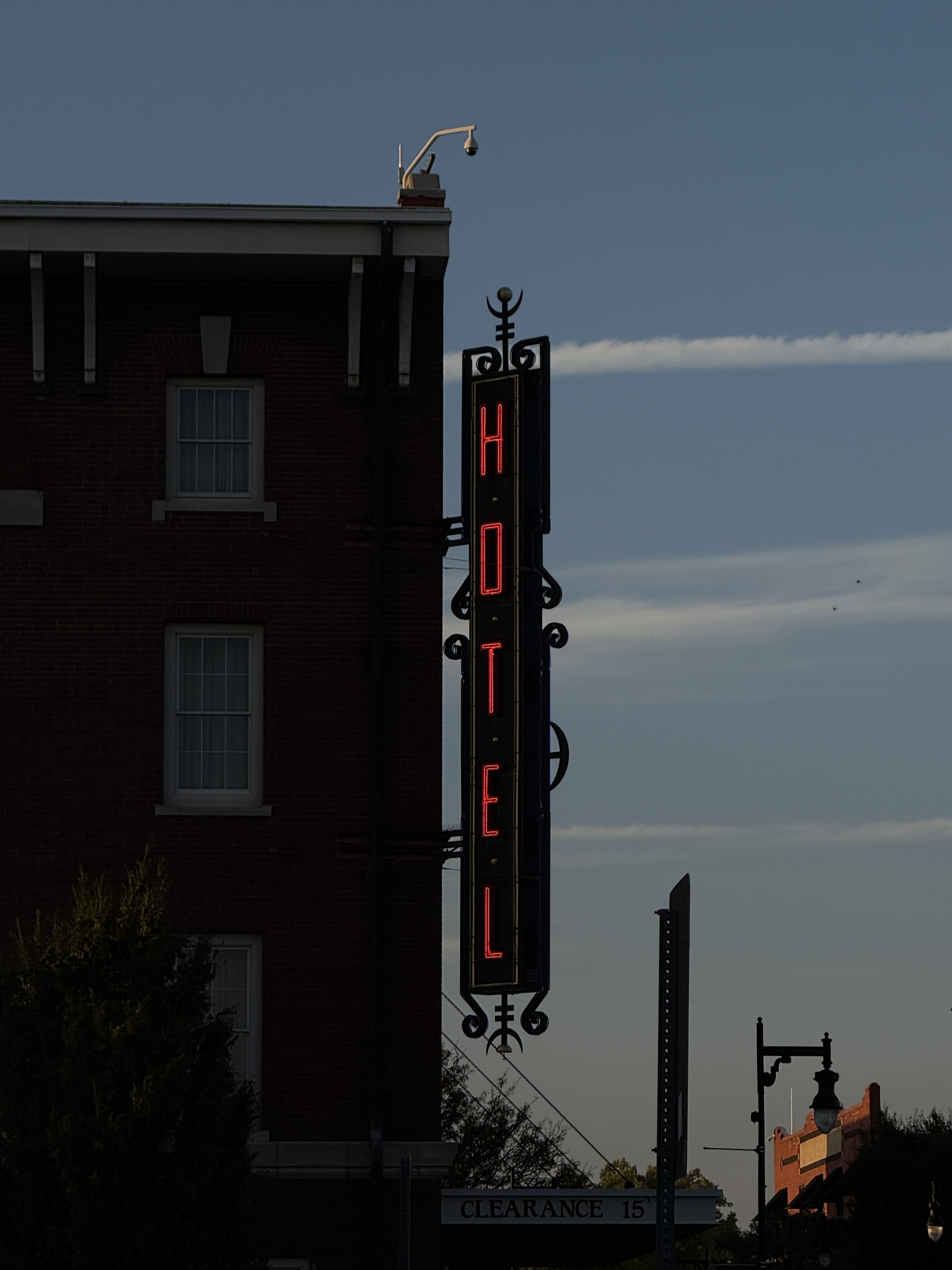
Neon sign at the Hotel at Old Town, located in the historic Keen Kutter Building

Old Town today contains a wide mix of uses within its historic brick warehouses and adjacent new construction. The district includes more than 100 businesses ranging from retail shops and boutiques to restaurants, galleries, and nightclubs. Several hotels operate in the neighborhood, most notably the Hotel at Old Town, a conversion of the former Keen Kutter warehouse building.

Residential redevelopment has been an important component of the area’s revitalization. Former warehouse buildings have been converted into loft apartments and condominiums, and some projects have incorporated below-market housing units as part of incentive agreements. Public spaces anchor the district, including Old Town Square, which is used for concerts, festivals, and seasonal events.

Infrastructure improvements have also been made to support the district’s growth. These include the construction of a multi-level parking garage, installation of pedestrian-scale lighting and wide sidewalks, and the introduction of shared parking programs to balance demand during peak evening hours. Collectively, these amenities have helped establish Old Town as one of Wichita’s premier entertainment and residential districts.

=== Cultural institutions ===
Old Town is also home to several cultural and entertainment venues. The Museum of World Treasures, located in a former warehouse, showcases artifacts ranging from ancient history to modern pop culture. The district contains performance spaces and theaters that host live music, comedy, and community events, contributing to Old Town’s role as a cultural hub within Wichita.

Public art installations and seasonal programming, such as outdoor film screenings and festivals in Old Town Square, further add to the neighborhood’s cultural offerings.

== Notable tenants ==
Old Town hosts a mix of businesses and organizations, including media, hospitality, and entertainment venues. The Wichita Business Journal and The Wichita Eagle have both maintained offices in the district.

Entertainment and dining establishments are also prominent. Boulevard Theatres is located within Old Town, alongside national chains such as Old Chicago Pizza & Taproom.

The district also includes design firms, contractors, and professional service companies that occupy renovated warehouse offices, contributing to Old Town’s role as a mixed-use neighborhood.

== Significance ==
Old Town is frequently cited as a successful example of urban revitalization and historic preservation in Wichita. The district was designated one of the "Great Places in America" by the American Planning Association in 2008, recognized for its collaborative planning process, bold vision, and adaptive reuse of historic warehouse structures. Since redevelopment efforts began in the 1980s, property values in the area have risen substantially. Today Old Town functions as a cultural hub, with its nightlife, arts venues, and festivals attracting both residents and visitors and contributing to the identity of downtown Wichita.

== Challenges and ongoing development ==
Like many redeveloped warehouse districts in the United States, Old Town faces the challenge of maintaining its historic character while also accommodating new construction and modern amenities. Parking supply and traffic circulation have been recurring issues, particularly as the district’s popularity has increased. The age of many buildings has also required ongoing infrastructure maintenance and environmental remediation.

City planners and private developers continue to explore ways to expand residential options within Old Town in order to increase the downtown population. The district is also closely tied to broader municipal efforts such as Project Downtown, which seeks to coordinate Wichita’s long-term redevelopment goals with the preservation and growth of Old Town.

== See also ==
- Downtown Wichita
- Keen Kutter Building
