= Woolf Brothers Clothing Company =

Historic building in Wichita, Kansas, United States

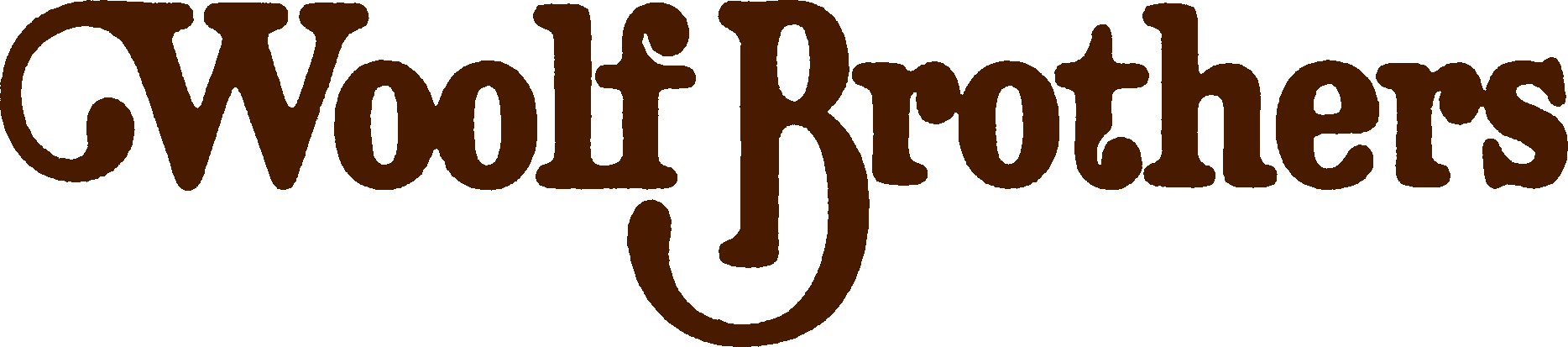
Woolf Brothers logo

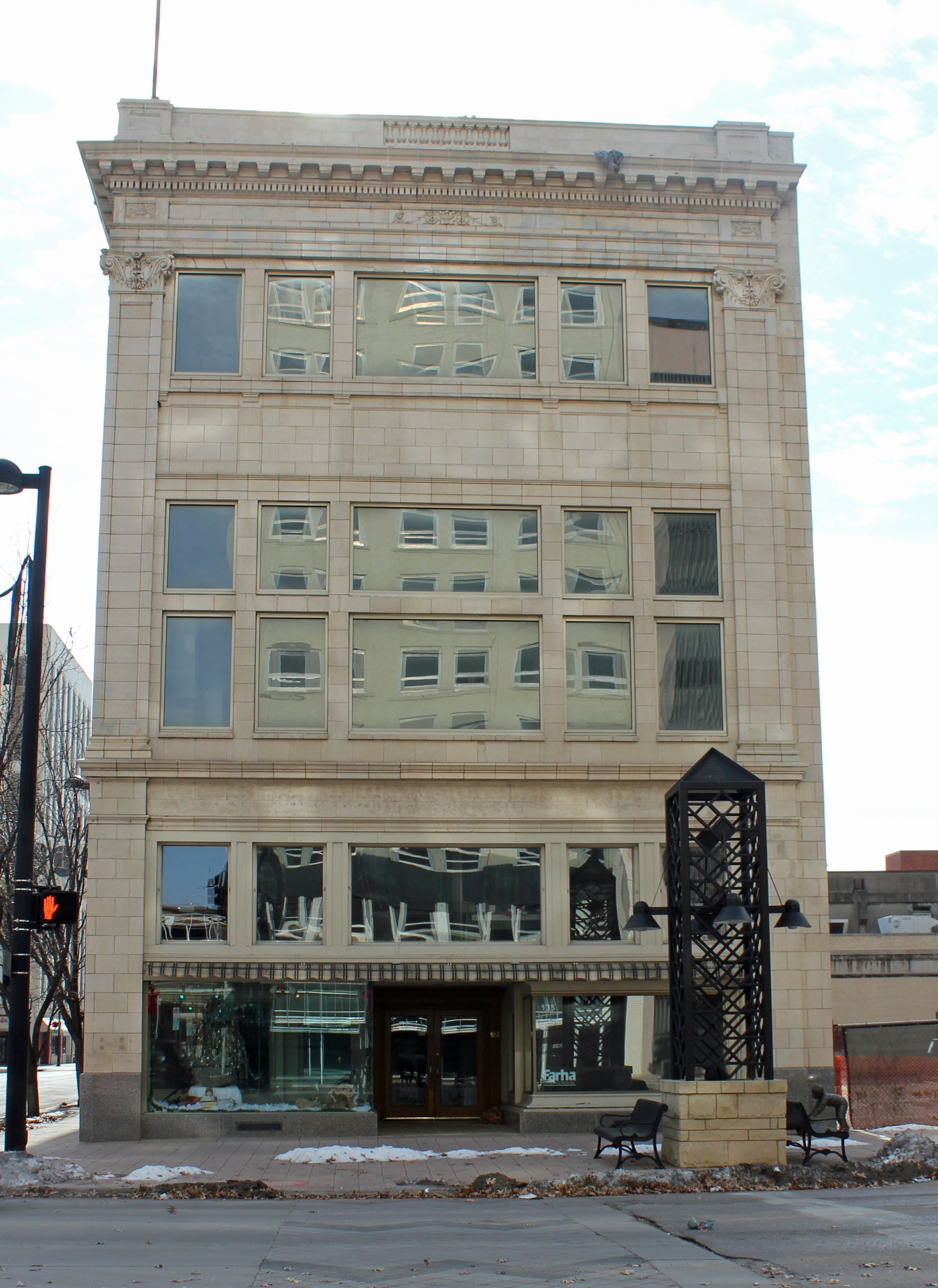
The Woolf Brothers Clothing Company building in 2013

Woolf Brothers Clothing Company is a historic building in Wichita, Kansas. It is listed in the National Register of Historic Places. It is at 135 East Douglas Avenue. It was built in 1922 and replaced Greenfield's Clothing and Furnishings for Men. The building was designed by Lorenz Schmidt and opened in January 1923.

The store was part of the Woolf Brothers retail clothing store chain which included several stores in other cities. The first of its stores opened in Kansas City in 1879. The chain was sold in 1985.

== See also ==
- Bitting Building
- National Register of Historic Places listings in Sedgwick County, Kansas
