= Holyoke Cottage =

Holyoke Cottage may refer to:

- Holyoke Cottage (Wichita, Kansas), listed on the NRHP in Sedgwick County, Kansas
- Holyoke Cottage (Sandy Creek, New York), NRHP-listed
