= C. W. Terry =

American architect

Charles W. Terry (1847–1931), commonly known as C.W. Terry, was an architect based in Wichita, Kansas. Several works credited to him and partnerships he was in are listed on the National Register of Historic Places.

According to a Discover Historic Wichita brochure, Terry resided in Wichita for about thirty years after moving to the city in 1885. He worked for the first two years with several associates including Elbert Dumont (1874-1904), Alfred Gould (dates unknown), A.T. Hayward (dates unknown), and G.K. Thompson (dates unknown). Dumont and Hayward soon started their own business, as did Gould. Edward Forsblom (1875-1961) joined him in 1906 and eventually took over the firm. Forsblom purchased the business in 1916 and Terry moved to California soon after where he died in 1931. In addition to the Grace Methodist Episcopal Church, C.W. Terry's company designed many fine residences extant in Wichita including the L.W. Clapp House, 1847 Wellington Place (1887), the Steinbuchel House 1905 Park Place (1887), the Cyrus M. Beachy House, 3715 E. Douglas (1909), and the Marc Clapp House, 1817 Wellington Place (1913). He also designed the elegant north addition to the Scottish Rite Temple, 332 E. First (1907) as well as numerous commercial buildings.

== Work ==
- Carey House (1887) at 525 E. Douglas Avenue in Wichita, Kansas (Terry & Dumont)
- L. W. Clapp House (1887) at 1847 Wellington Pl. Wichita, Kansas (Terry & Hayward) for City Manager and then mayor L. W. Clapp
- J.E. Raymond House, (1893) later known as the Raymond Community Home, for Girard, Kansas founding father and merchant John E. Raymond at 301 Osage Street. NRHP-listed.
- Grace Methodist Episcopal Church (1910) at 944 South Topeka in Wichita, Kansas. Classical Revival style, NRHP-listed.
- Bitting Building (1912) in Wichita (Terry & Dumont)
