= B. H. Campbell House =

Historic home in Wichita, Kansas

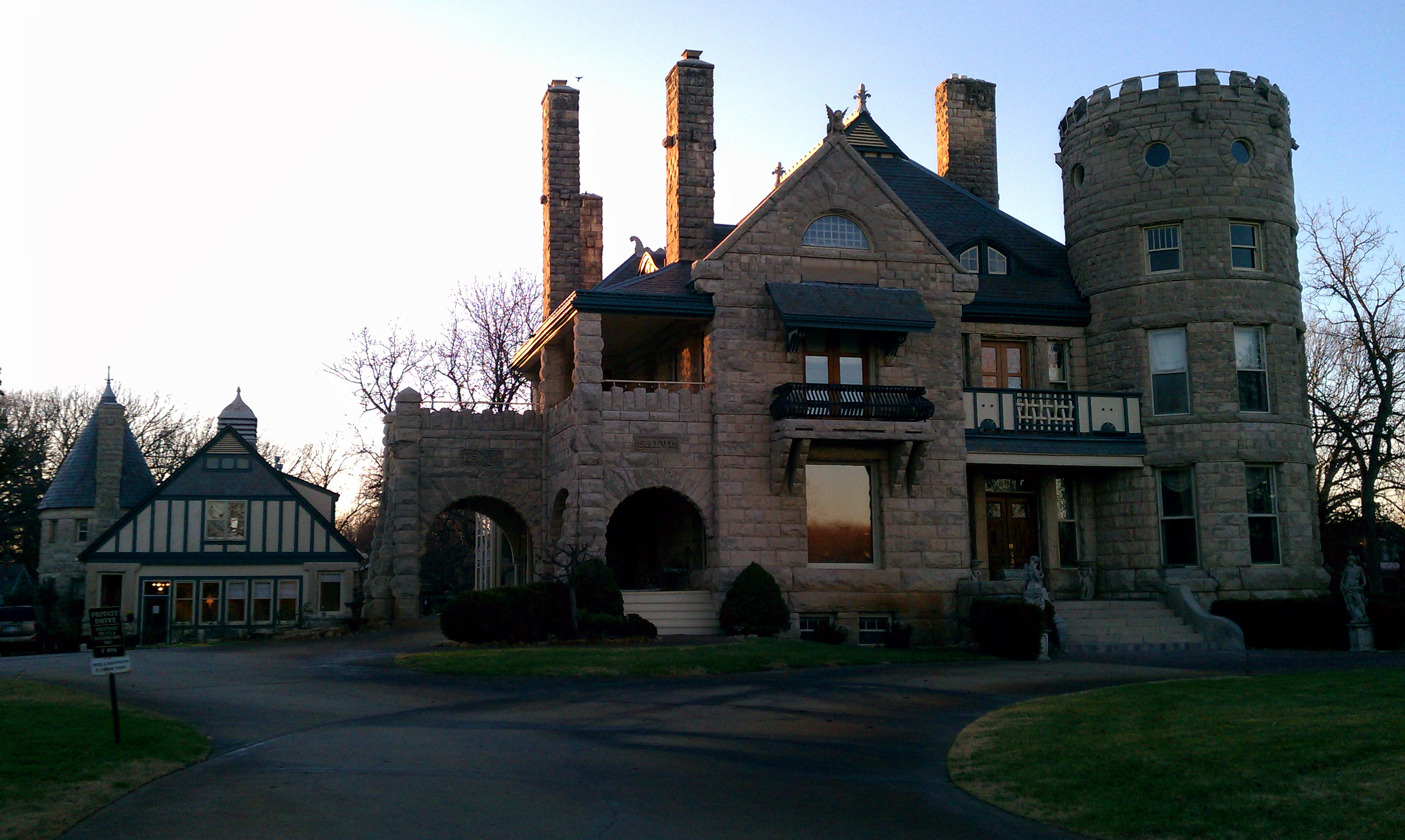
The B. H. Campbell House in 2012

The B. H. Campbell House is a historic home in Wichita, Kansas, with distinctive castle like architecture. It is listed on the National Register of Historic Places.

Built of limestone, the home's interior features cherry, walnut, and mahogany wood. The residential building was previously operated as a bed and breakfast and may now be available for events. It is at 1155 N. River Blvd. Burton "Barbecue" Harvey Campbell was a cattle baron and investor. The home has 5-story turret and stained glass from Europe. It is on the other side of North River Boulevard from the Little Arkansas River.

== See also ==
- National Register of Historic Places listings in Sedgwick County, Kansas
