= Bitting Historic District =

Historic district in Kansas, United States

- U.S. National Register of Historic Places
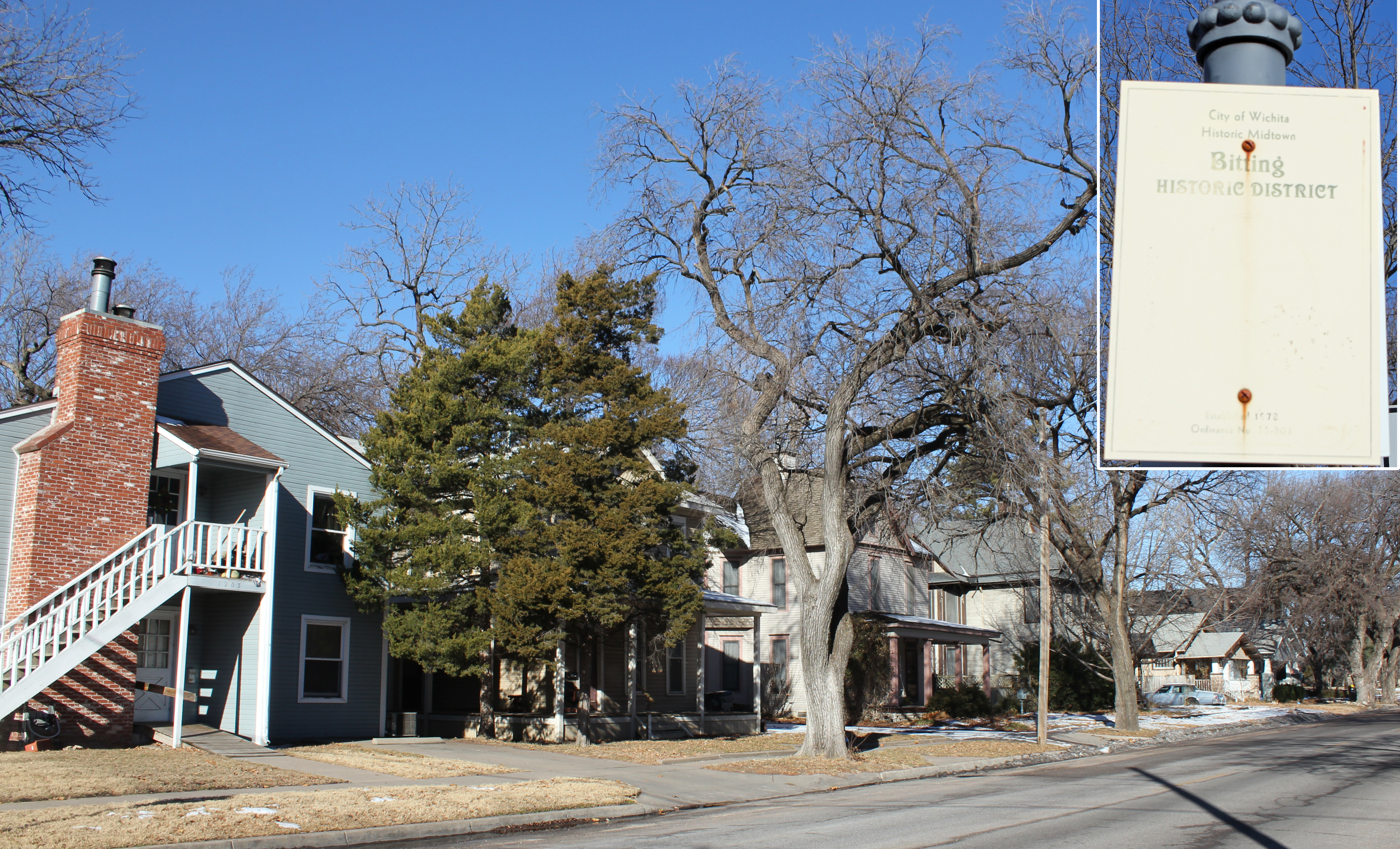

- Location within Kansas Location within the United States
- Location: Generally the 1100 and 1200 Blks of Bitting, Wichita, Kansas
- Coordinates: 37.704°N 97.348°W
- Area: 8.1 acres (3.3 ha)
- Architectural style: Late Victorian, Late 19th And 20th Century Revivals
- NRHP reference No.: 04000776
- Added to NRHP: August 4, 2004

Bitting Historic District is in Wichita, Kansas. The working class area was built out during several architectural periods. It has a shopping area of two-story buildings. The District is located along a section of Bitting Avenue. There is also a Bitting Building downtown. It was added to the National Register of Historic Places in 2004.

== See also ==
- National Register of Historic Places listings in Sedgwick County, Kansas
