= Simmons Hardware Company Warehouse =

- U.S. National Register of Historic Places
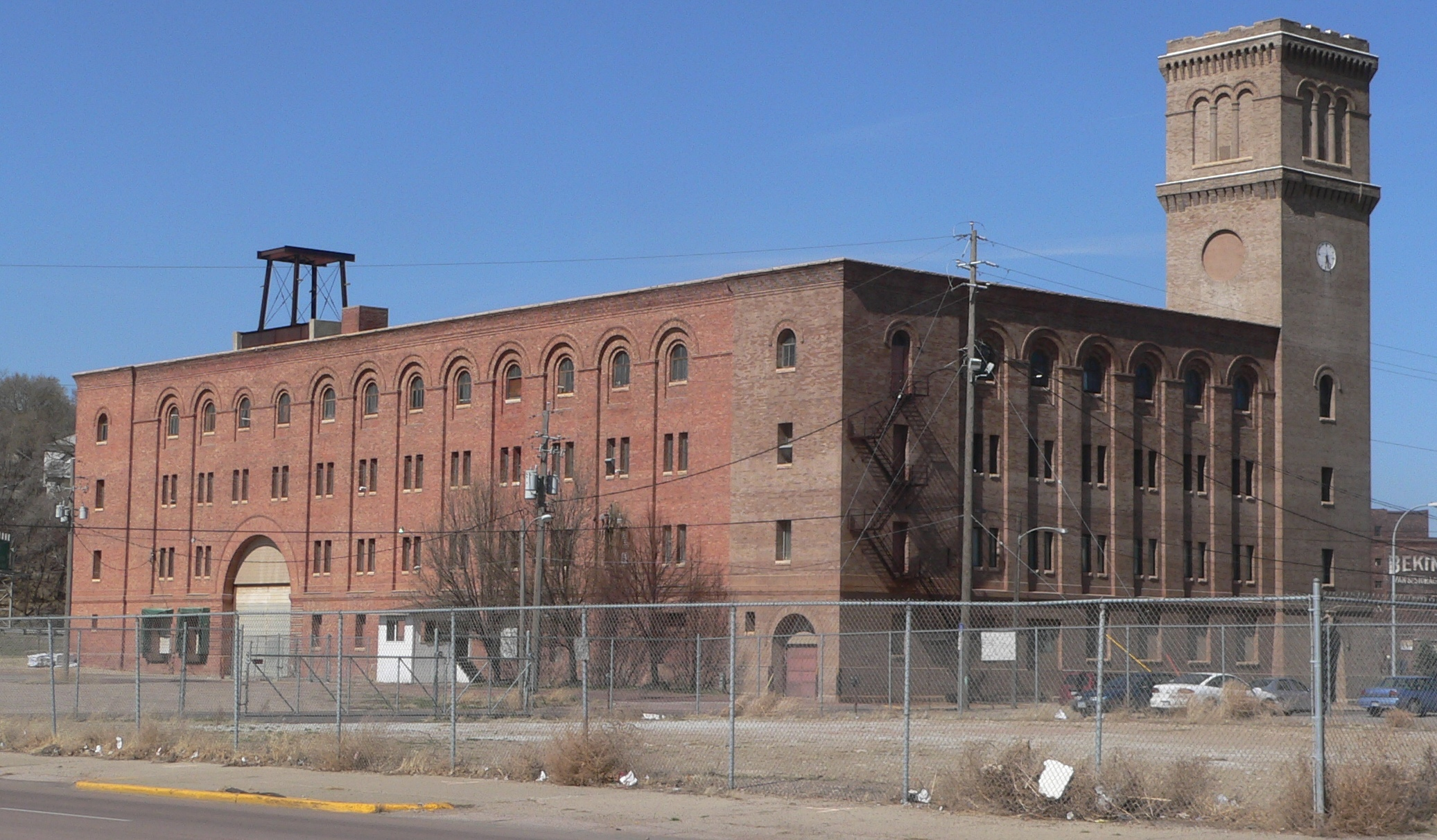

- Location within Iowa
- Location: 323 Water St. Sioux City, Iowa
- Coordinates: 42°29′35″N 96°24′34″W
- Built: 1905
- Built by: Gilberth, Frank B.
- Architect: Gordon, Tracy & Swartwout
- Architectural style: Romanesque Revival
- NRHP reference No.: 08000332
- Added to NRHP: April 25, 2008

The Simmons Hardware Company Warehouse, also known as the Battery Building, is a historic warehouse located in Sioux City, Iowa that is on the National Register of Historic Places. The six-story building covered a whole block and its construction was supervised by Frank Bunker Gilbreth, Sr., the time and motion study pioneer.

== History ==
The building was designed in 1905 for the Simmons Hardware Company of St. Louis to allow the rapid delivery and dispatch of their hardware products.. The design is said to be influenced by the Marshall Field's Wholesale Store in Chicago which was designed by Henry Hobson Richardson in 1887. The Simmons company used the New York company of Gordon, Tracy and Swartwout to do their design. The developer was the unusual Frank Bunker Gilbreth, Sr., who became famous for being the central character in the book "Cheaper By The Dozen.

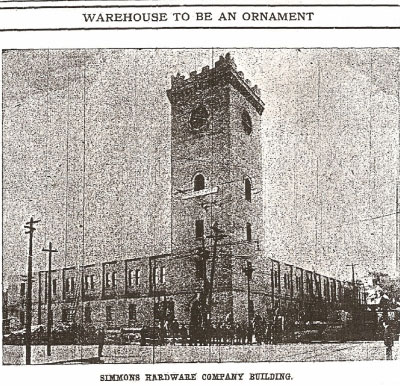
Building during construction in 1906

The architects specified that hundreds of 20-foot (6.1 m) hardened concrete piles were to be driven in to allow the soft ground to take the weight of the (estimated) two million bricks required to construct the building. Whilst the building was being built a sixth floor and other changes were made to the design. The bricks alone would have required over 250 railway cars to transport them and another 450 cars were also required to transport other building materials. The railway cars were of course easy to source as the building had its own railroad switching facilities.

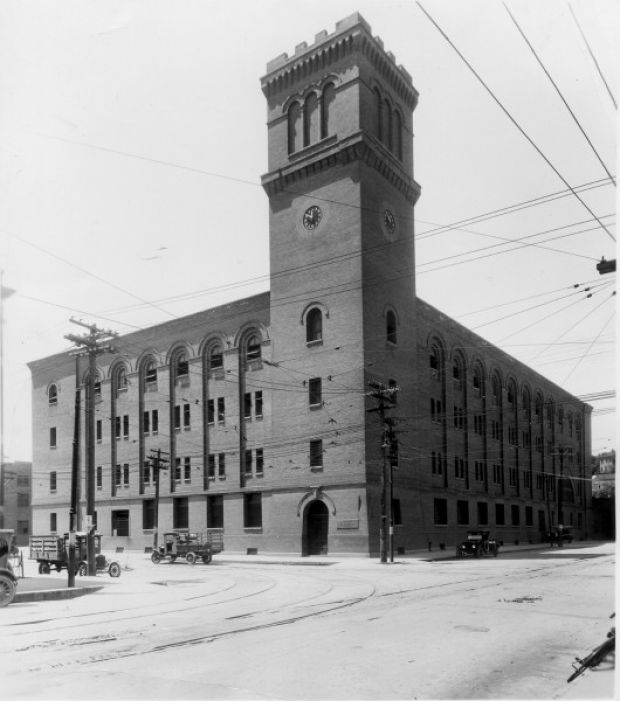
Simmons Hardware Company Building in Sioux City in 1917

The 123-foot (37 m) clock tower was designed to and would become an important landmark. The building was intended to be an "ornament" and the tower was intended to convey importance and the 12 numbers on the clockface were intended to be replaced by the letters T-R-O-Q-R-L-A-T-P-I-F. This abbreviation was to signify the Simmons motto which was "The recollection of quality remains long after the price is forgotten."

The company was the first to establish a nationwide brand for hardware which they supplied via warehouses in six states across America. Other warehouses were in New York, Iowa, Minnesota, Ohio, and a four storey building in Wichita, Kansas. The warehouse's stock consisted of many items, including ammunition, knives, wires, and even dog collars. The company said that, "If you can't eat it, and it don't pour or fold, it's hardware". Salesmen were not only employed to sell all products, but they also had specialist salespeople.

The company had used an aggressive system of business where it aimed to buy up its suppliers so that it had the choice of best machinery and they could give priority to their needs. In the 1920 the Winchester Repeating Arms Company decided to diversify to include knives and hardware. They bought companies and also merged with the Simmons Hardware Company. During the 1920s this warehouse would have been at the disposal of the merged Winchester and Simmons company. The Winchester and Keen Kutter brands did good business during the 1920s but in 1929 they agreed to separate and Simmons and this building returned to their core business.

== After hardware ==
There were multiple owners of the warehouse throughout the years. It was owned by the Kollman-Warner Seed Company in 1939, and in 1944, it was leased to the Sioux City Battery Corporation. Local farm retailer Bomgaars bought the building in 1973 and used it as a warehouse and for its corporate offices.

The Bomgaars headquarters moved out in 2005 and in 2007, it was planned that the warehouse to be converted into condominiums, offices, and a restaurant. The project would have been completed with a $10.5 million budget. The owners, Roger and Jane Bomgaars, who owned the retail chain Bomgaars, partnered with developers from Omaha, Nebraska with plans to complete the restoration. The plans required city authorities to grant additional tax breaks and to make land available for parking.

In 2013, the Hard Rock International announced plans to open a Sioux City location, situating casino offices on the third floor of the warehouse, along with a 54-room boutique hotel taking the top two floors. The main floor of the warehouse now features the Hotel lobby, and two restaurants. A new casino adjoins the historic brick building. Plans evolved to move the hotel inside the historic building and for a 60-foot illuminated guitar to adorn the roof of the structure. Both the casino and hotel opened on August 1, 2014.
