= Keen Kutter Building =

- U.S. Historic district – Contributing property
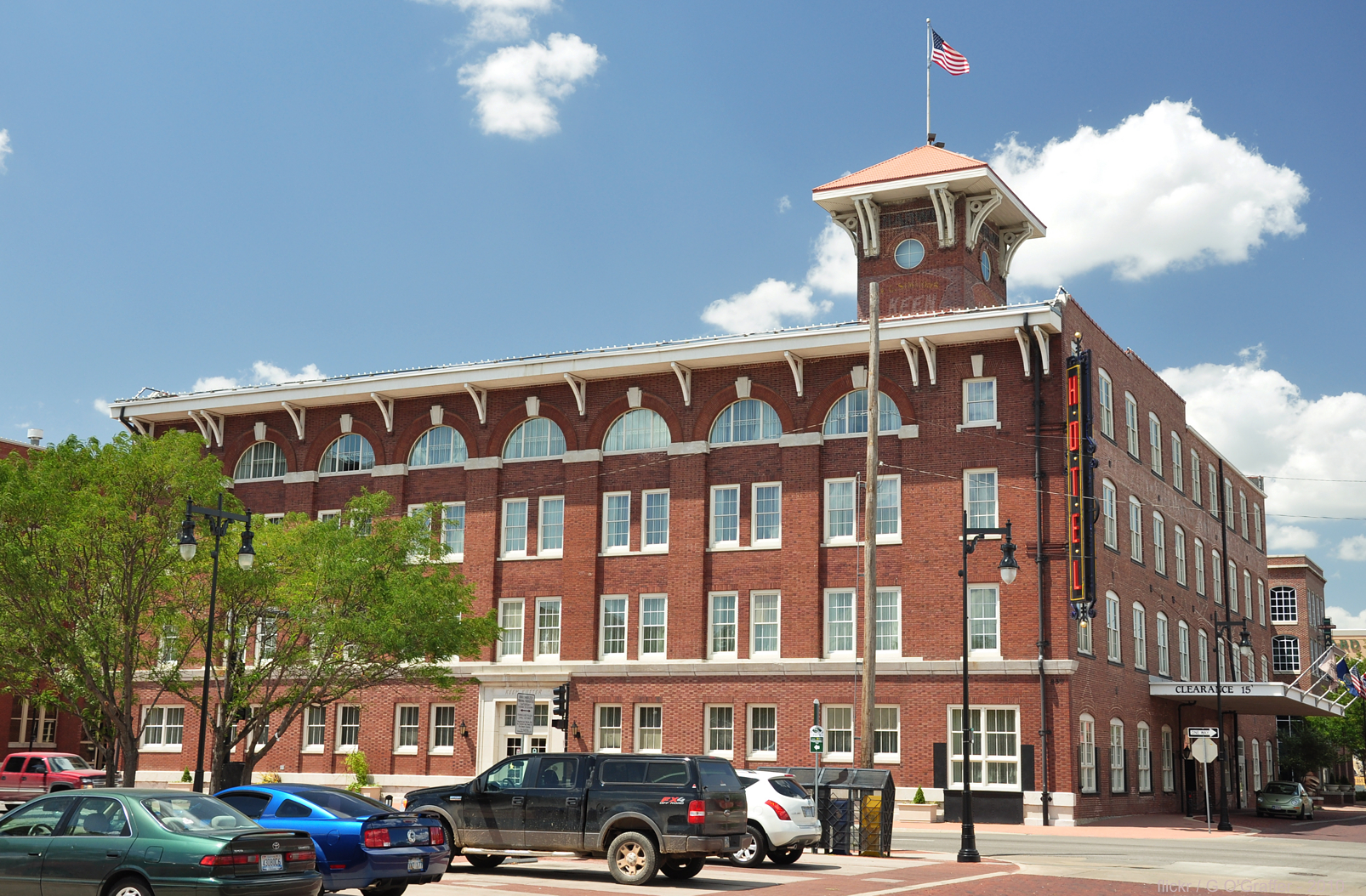

- Location within Kansas
- Location: 830 East First Street, Wichita, Kansas
- Coordinates: 37°41′17.3″N 97°19′40″W
- Built: 1906
- Architect: Mauran, Russell & Garden
- Architectural style: Romanesque Revival
- Part of: Wichita Historic Warehouse and Jobbers District (ID03001172)
- Added to NRHP: November 21, 2003

The Keen Kutter Building is a former hardware warehouse located in Wichita, Kansas, that was added to the National Register of Historic Places in 2003. The four-story building has a free standing water tower that powered a water sprinkler system. The tower is an important landmark on the city's skyline. In 1999 the building was re-purposed as the Hotel at Old Town, which includes a large collection of Keen Kutter hardware on display.

== History ==
This building displayed the owners as the "Morton Simmons Hardware Co." and it had Keen Kutter logos on its tower. Keen Kutter was a trademark owned by the Simmons Hardware Company. Simmons was the first company to establish a nationwide brand for a wholesale hardware company. Simmons Hardware was one of the first to publish a full line hardware catalog. These catalogues included thousands of illustrated pages that allowed the purchaser to select items. The goods were sent by rail, direct to one of the warehouses. This building was a warehouse supplied by a spur line of the Frisco Railway to nine shipping bays. There is little evidence of the bays today.

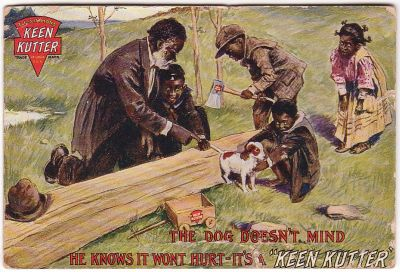
"The Dog Doesn't Mind": A Keen Kutter advertising postcard, depicting a family about to dock a dog's tail with an axe.

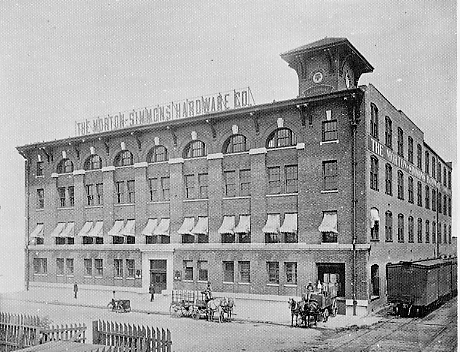
The Morton Simmons Hardware Company building. Note the railway car delivering goods.

Simmons products were supplied to customers via warehouses like this one in six states. The other warehouses were in New York, Iowa, Minnesota, Ohio, and the warehouse at Sioux City in Iowa. The warehouse's stock included ammunition, lawn mowers, axes, knives, wires, and cutlery. The company's motto was, "The Recollection Of Quality Remains Long After The Price Is Forgotten".

This 80,000-square-foot (7,400 m^{2}) building was constructed in 1905–1906, designed by the St. Louis architects Mauran, Russell & Garden, and was strongly based on the Cupples Building in St Louis. The building was constructed in brick by the Wurster Construction company.

The tall free standing tower was designed to be and became an important landmark. On each side of the building the owners advertised their name. The faded remains of the logos for "E.C.Simmons - Keen Kutter" and the subsequent owners "Harwi" can still be seen today (2013). The tower's more practical purpose was to hold 20,000 US gallons (76,000 L; 17,000 imp gal) of water that could be delivered to sprinklers on each of the four floors in the event of a fire. This was a modern purpose-built building that is estimated to have cost $250,000 at the time of its construction. The design included electric elevators, an internal telephone system and messenger call boxes. An unusual part of the design was the offices, which were situated to maximize their use of natural light. These offices were placed in a 17-foot (5.2 m) wide strip that stretched 150-foot (46 m) along the south side of the first (ground level) and second stories. On the ground floor was a sample room where the company's goods were displayed and a room with easy chairs that was available to both customers and employees. The Simmons company designed their buildings for efficiency and were known to employ the leading time and motion pioneer Frank Bunker Gilbreth, Sr.

In the 1920s the Winchester Repeating Arms Company diversified to include knives and hardware. They merged with the Simmons Hardware Company. During the 1920s this warehouse was at the disposal of the merged Winchester and Simmons company. The Winchester and Keen Kutter brands did good business but in 1929 they agreed to separate and Simmons and this building returned to their core business.

The Keen Kutter tools that were stored and sold from this warehouse are now collectibles. The contemporary book Keen Kutter Planes lists over 800 items from the brand.

== After Simmons and Winchester ==
The building was sold in October 1929 to Alfred Jonathon Harwi who had a Kansas-based hardware company. The Harwi company started in 1875 and was incorporated in 1889. The Harwi company had a slightly smaller building of 75,000 square feet (7,000 m^{2}), based in Atchison, Kansas. Harwi's purchase of the Wichita building was the same year that Simmons and the Winchester became separate companies again.

The building was later purchased by Jack deBoer, a local hotel owner, who had the building converted into a hotel. The new 115-room hotel opened as the "Hotel in Old Town" in 1999. The hotel has purchased what it claims to be the "largest authentic collection ever assembled" of Keen Kutter hardware which are displayed on all the floors like a private museum focusing on Keen Kutter and old Wichita.
