= Simmons Hardware Company =

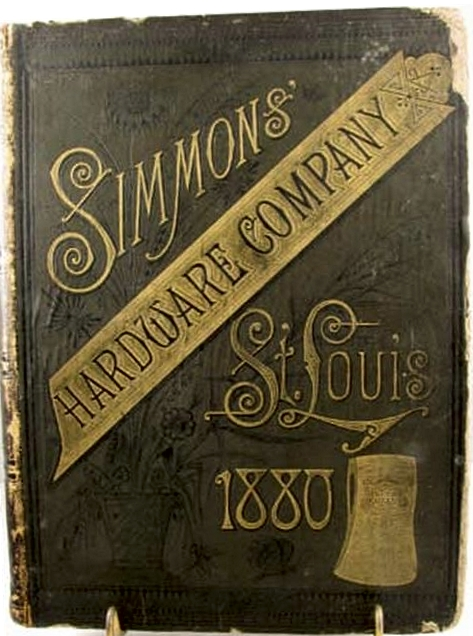
- brochure from 1880
- Industry: Hardware
- Founded: 1874
- Founder: Edward C. Simmons
- Headquarters: St Louis, United States
- Number of locations: Six
- Products: hammers, hinges

The Simmons Hardware Company was a hardware manufacturer based in St. Louis with locations in six states.

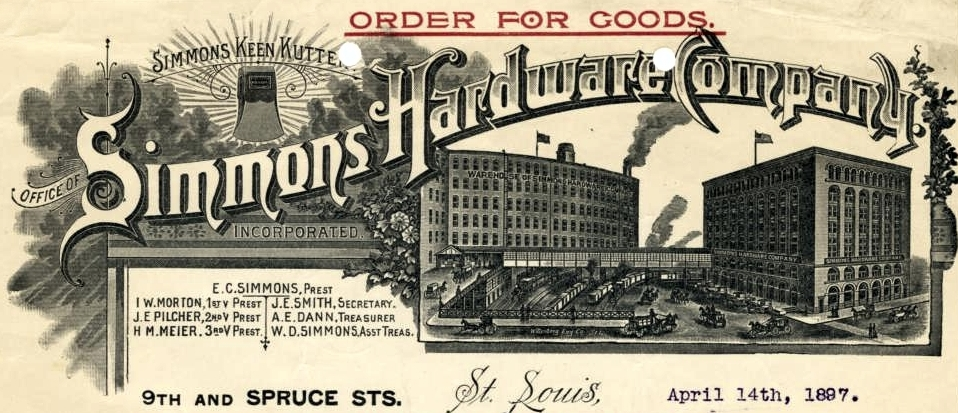
Simmonds Hardware Company order for goods, 1897

== Staff ==
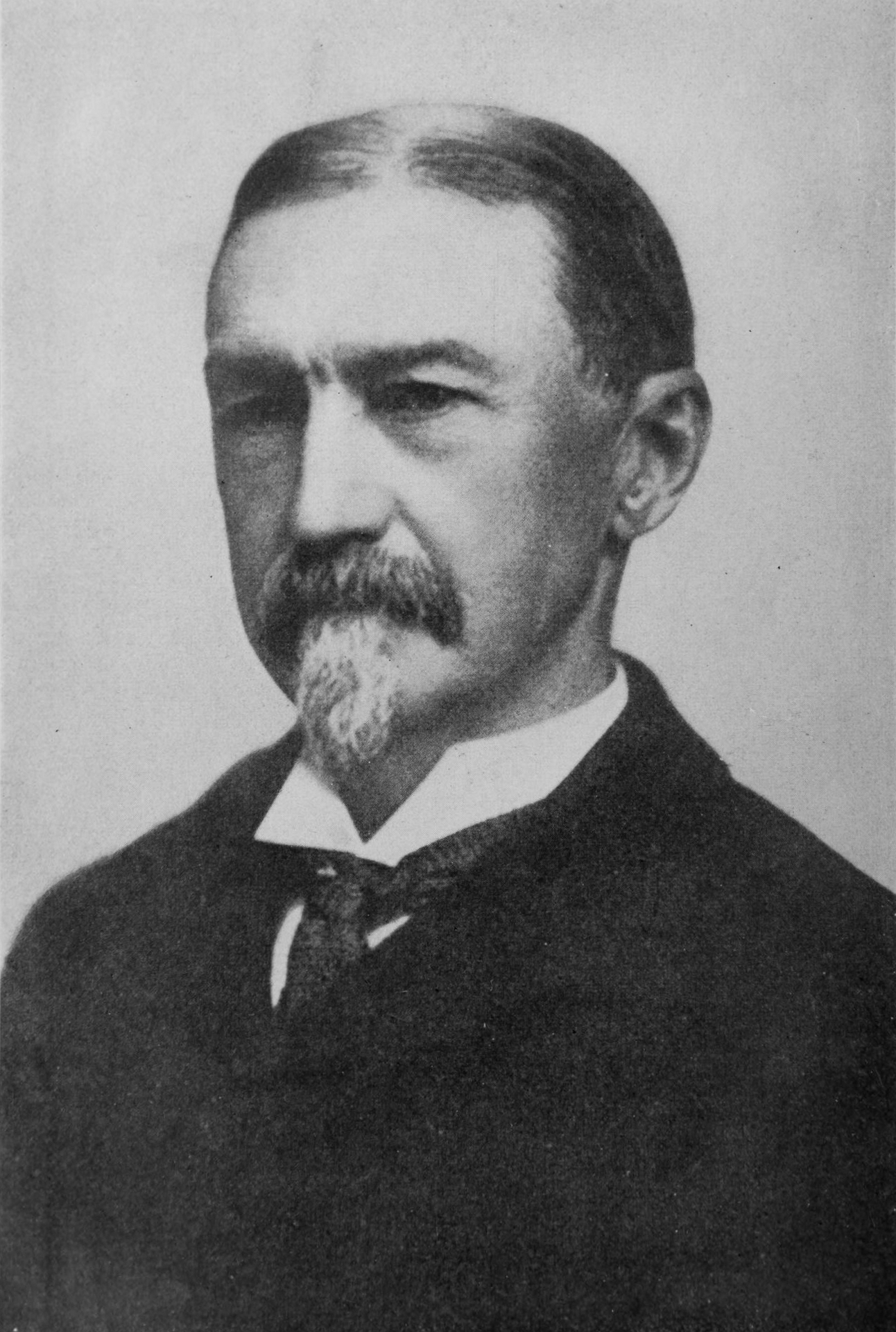
Edward C. Simmons

The founder of the company was Edward C. Simmons, who started the company in 1874 and retired in 1898.

The founder's son, George Welch Simmons, started working his way up through the company in 1901, with a salary of $20 a week for driving trucks to the St. Louis warehouse. In 1904, he became the general manager and then later the vice-president of all the warehouses. Simmons was a Distinguished Successful Americans of his Day in 1912.

L. E. Crandall was originally working as part of the Churchill Hardware Company. After entering into a partnership with the Simmons Hardware Company, he became well known as a salesman by traveling through Illinois. Crandall became a sales manager at the St. Louis warehouse due to this reputation, later becoming General Sales Manager of all locations. His office was in New Haven, Connecticut.

== History ==
The company's stock consisted of many items, including ammunition, knives, mincers, wires, and even dog collars. They defined its products saying, "If you can't eat it, and it don't pour or fold, it's hardware". Salesmen were employed to sell either all items or specific items.

Keen Kutter tools were manufactured by the company, and are now collectibles. The book Keen Kutter Planes lists over 800 items from the brand.

Most of the company's capital stock were companies which resulted in the net worth of these companies rising. A Sioux City warehouse was opened after the corporation bought out the stock of the Baker Hardware Company, which was located in the city. Their intention was to have the same quality in that location.

The company was involved in a legal case, titled "Simmons Hardware Co. v. City of St. Louis", that was heard by the Supreme Court of Missouri. The case was filed by the corporation to retrieve part of their payment on three taxes, which they paid in order to receive a merchant's license for the years of 1908 and 1909. Part of their payment of the sales tax, ad valorem tax, and the value added tax were thought by the company to be incorrect.

The warehouse chain expanded from Missouri to five other states, located in New York, Iowa, Minnesota, Ohio, and Kansas.

== Merger with Winchester ==
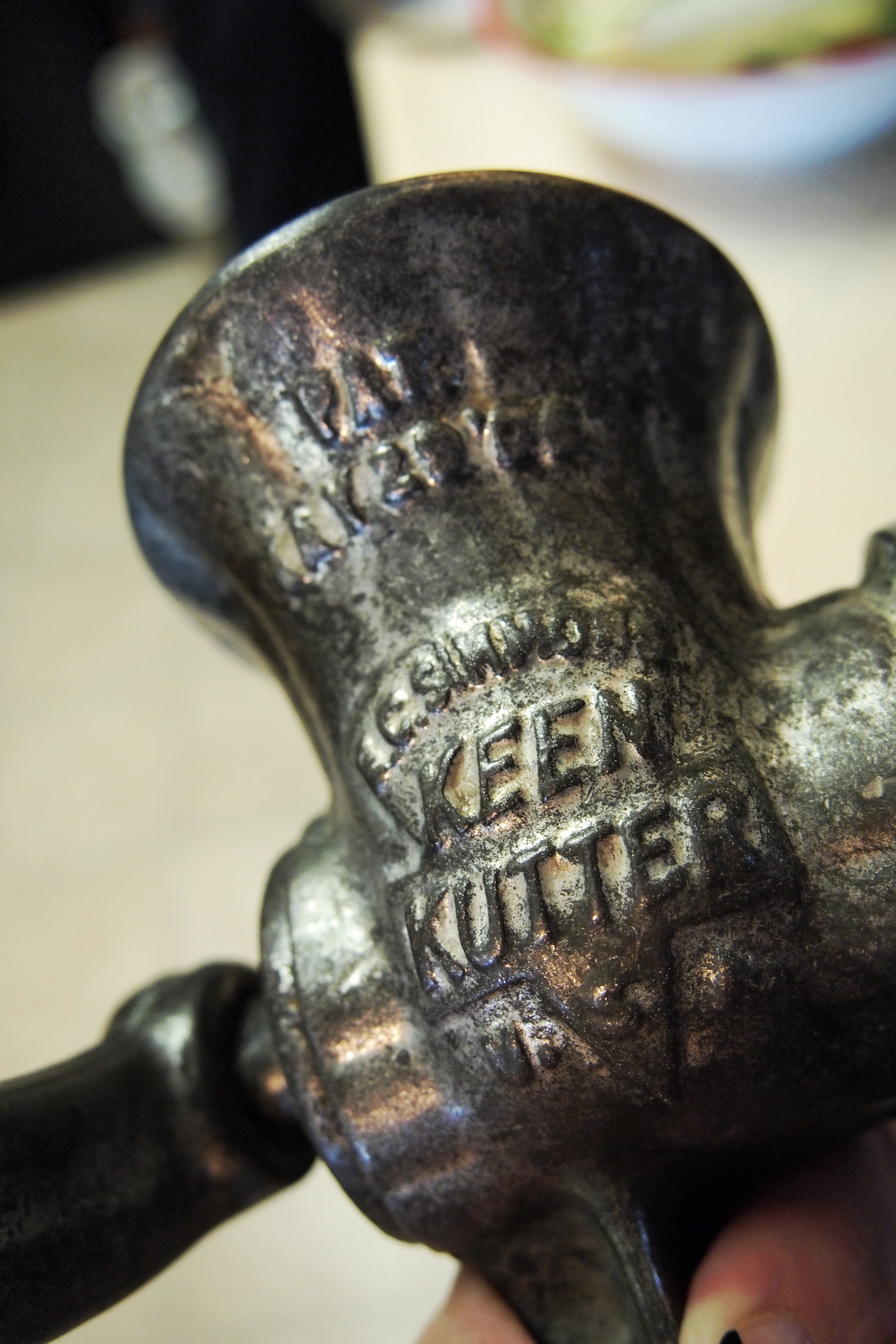
A Keen Kutter mincer from E. Simmons

The company had used an aggressive system of business where it aimed to buy up its suppliers so that it had the choice of best machinery and they could give priority to their needs. The company would then sell off the excess capacity in these companies. Their Keen Kutter brand advertised nationally, and the KK initials were used for several of their other brands. In 1902 they bought the Walden Knife company in Walden, New York. This was of interest when the Winchester Repeating Arms Company decided to include knives among their products. They merged with the Simmons Hardware Company, and moved the Walden machinery from New York to their base in Connecticut. The Winchester and Keen Kutter brands flourished during the 1920s but in 1929 they agreed to separate and Simmons returned to their core business. In October of the same year they sold the Keen Kutter Building in Wichita to Alfred Jonathon Harwi's who had a hardware company in Atchison, Kansas.

== See also ==
- Keen Kutter
