= Grace Methodist Episcopal Church (Wichita, Kansas) =

Historic church in Kansas, United States

- U.S. National Register of Historic Places
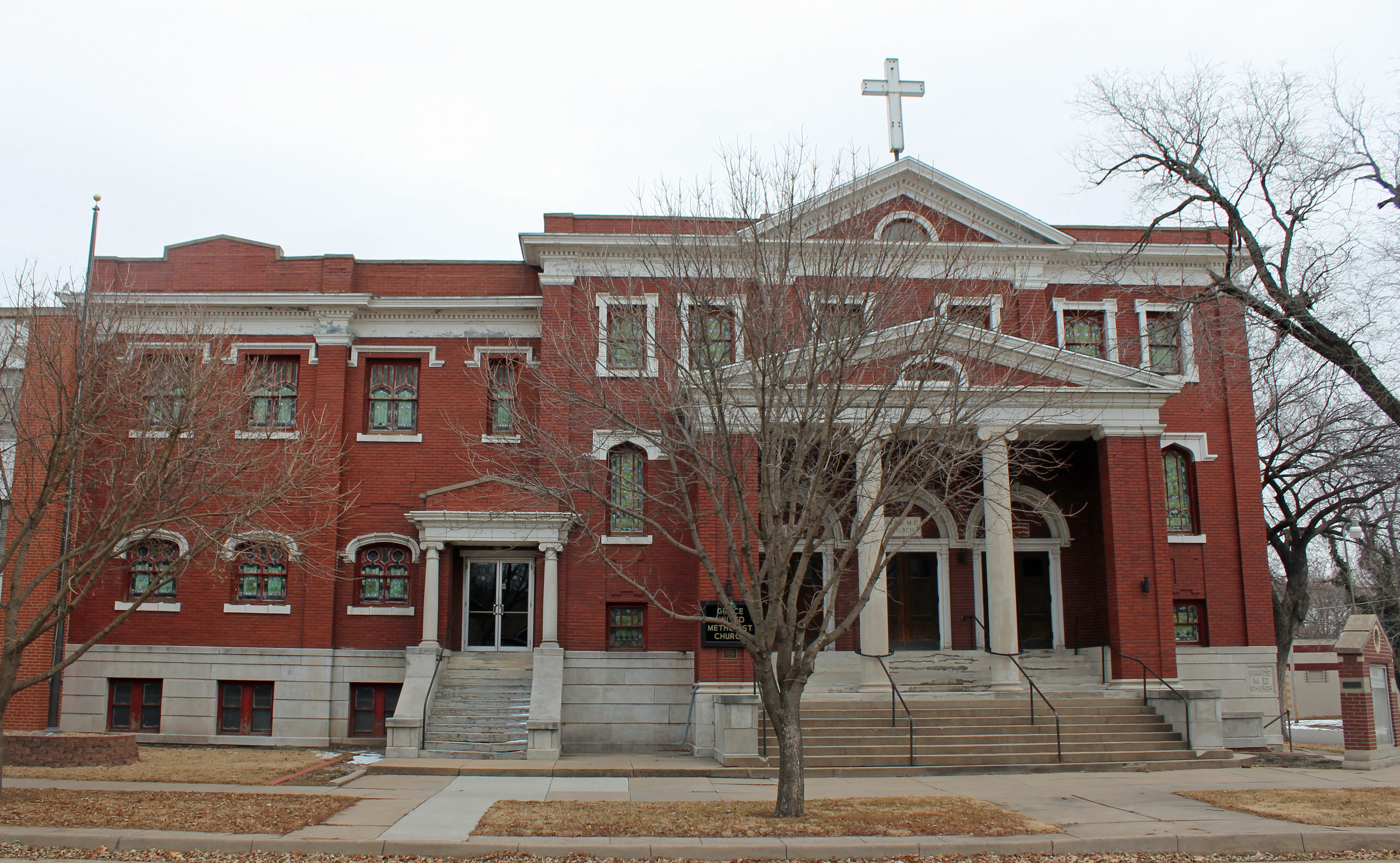
- The church in 2013.

- Location within Kansas Location within the United States
- Location: 944 S. Topeka, Wichita, Kansas
- Coordinates: 37°40′30″N 97°20′0″W
- Area: Less than one acre
- Built: 1910
- Architect: C.W. Terry
- Architectural style: Classical Revival
- NRHP reference No.: 06000599
- Added to NRHP: July 12, 2006

The Grace Methodist Episcopal Church in Wichita, Kansas, later known as Grace United Methodist Church, is a historic church at 944 S. Topeka. It was built in 1910 and added to the National Register in 2006.

It is a two-story Classical Revival-style church designed by architect C. W. Terry, and was built at a cost of $65,000.

C.W. Terry also designed the J.E. Raymond House in Girard, Kansas. It too is NRHP-listed.
