= Keen Kutter =

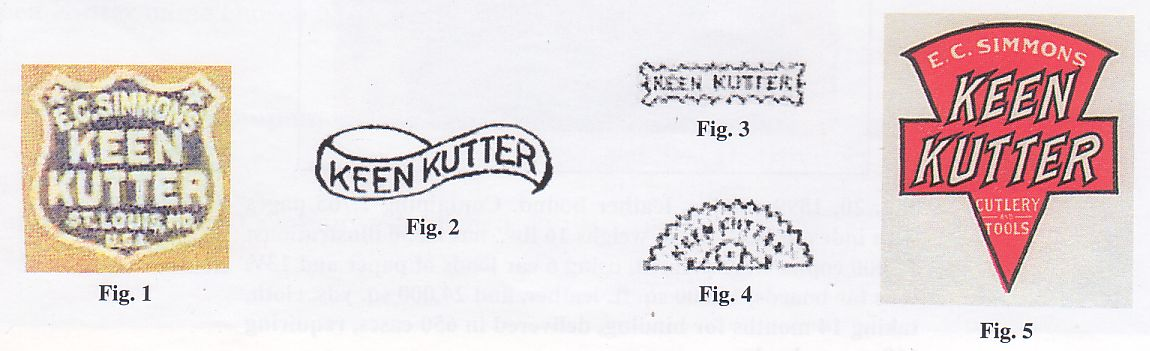
Figures 1 through 4 are examples of logos used by Simmons Hardware Co. prior to 1900. The common trademark (Fig. 5) was first used around 1900. It represents the tooth of a saw through a piece of wood.

Keen Kutter is a trademark used by the Simmons Hardware Company of St. Louis, Missouri, and was used on their highest quality tools and cutlery.

== History ==
Simmons Hardware Company was purchased by arch rival Shapleigh Hardware Company (also of St. Louis) in 1940. Shapleigh Hardware Company was known for their premium brand Diamond Edge. After Shapleigh acquired the Keen Kutter trademark it was modified by replacing the "E.C. Simmons" in the top of the logo with Shapleigh's (Fig. 6). Shapleigh continued to use the trademark on products until they went out of business in 1960.

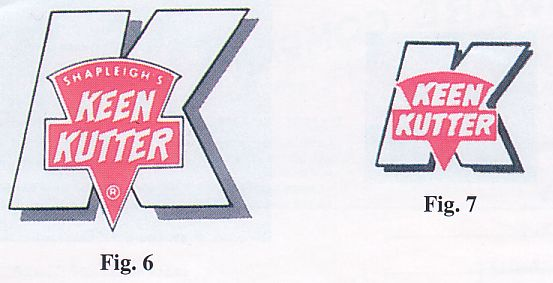

After several years the Keen Kutter trademark was sold to Val-Test Distributors of Chicago, Illinois, a wholesale hardware buyers' group. Val-Test allows smaller wholesale hardware companies to order goods. The orders are combined with orders from other hardware companies allowing for quantity discounts from manufactures. After Val-Test acquired the trademark, they removed the "Shapleigh's" leaving the top of the logo blank (Fig. 7). Throughout the 1960s, '70s and '80s, Keen Kutter knives were made for VAL-TEST by Schrade Cutlery Co. and in the 2000s, limited use of the Keen Kutter trademark was authorized for the manufacturer of knives by Frost Cutlery Co. and Bear and Sons Cutlery Co.. These knives are currently distributed by VAL-TEST.

The Keen Kutter trademark is currently privately held.

== Collectible interest ==
Items bearing the Keen Kutter trademark are considered collectible. There were numerous items produced which have cross collectibility. Pocket knives, hand tools, railway locks, and advertising items from Keen Kutter are of interest to many collectors. Jerry and Elaine Heuring, authors of Collector's Guide To Keen Kutter, have documented current values and general information in their books. The Hardware Companies Kollector's Klub founded in 1995 is another great source of information for Keen Kutter collectors.
