= Lorenz Schmidt =

Lorenz Schmidt from the University of Erlangen-Nuremberg, Erlangen, Germany was named Fellow of the Institute of Electrical and Electronics Engineers (IEEE) in 2016 for contributions to millimeter-wave and terahertz imaging systems.
