= Carey House (Kansas) =

Hotel in Wichita, Kansas, U.S.

- U.S. National Register of Historic Places
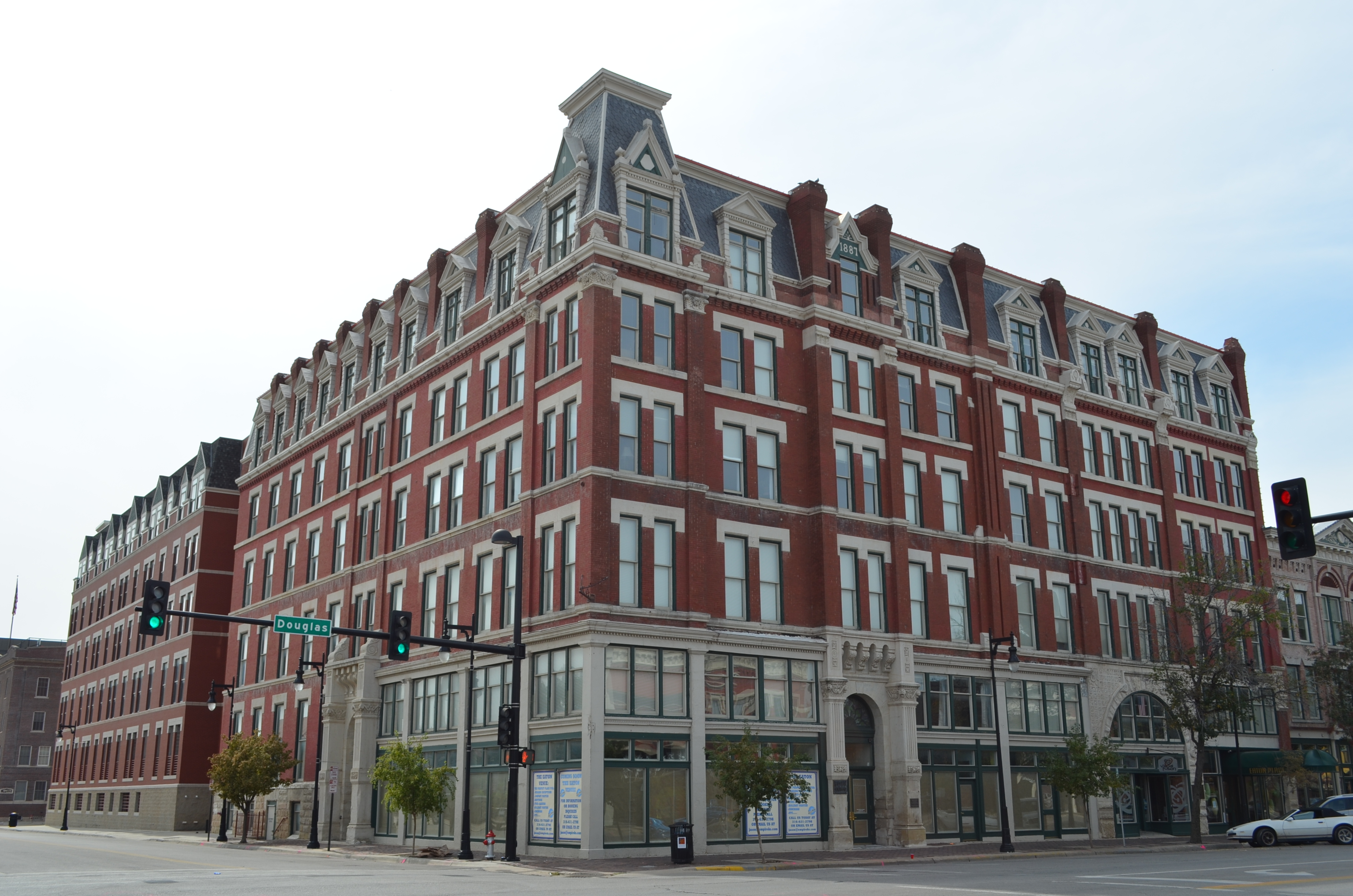

- Location within Kansas Location within the United States
- Location: 525 E. Douglas Ave. Wichita, Kansas
- Coordinates: 37°41′09″N 97°19′53″W
- Area: 1 acre (0.40 ha)
- Built: 1886-1887
- Architects: Terry & Dumont
- Architectural style: Late Victorian
- NRHP reference No.: 72000526
- Added to NRHP: April 13, 1972

Carey House, also known as the Eaton Hotel, is a historic building completed in 1887 in Wichita, Kansas, United States. It was built by businessman and mayor John B. Carey and has a tower at its northeast corner. It is listed on the National Register of Historic Places.

The building was designed by the firm Terry & Dumont (Charles W. Terry and Elbert Dumont). It is at 525 East Douglas Avenue in the heart of Carey House Square District, a contiguous block of late 19th and early 20th century buildings. The 5-story building is an example of eclectic architecture.

Terry & Dumont are also credited with designing the Bitting Building in Wichita and Dumont with the H.F. Smith House at 721 W. Harvey Avenue in Wellington, Kansas, both properties NRHP listed.

== See also ==
- National Register of Historic Places listings in Sedgwick County, Kansas
