= Scottish Rite Temple (Wichita, Kansas) =

- U.S. National Register of Historic Places
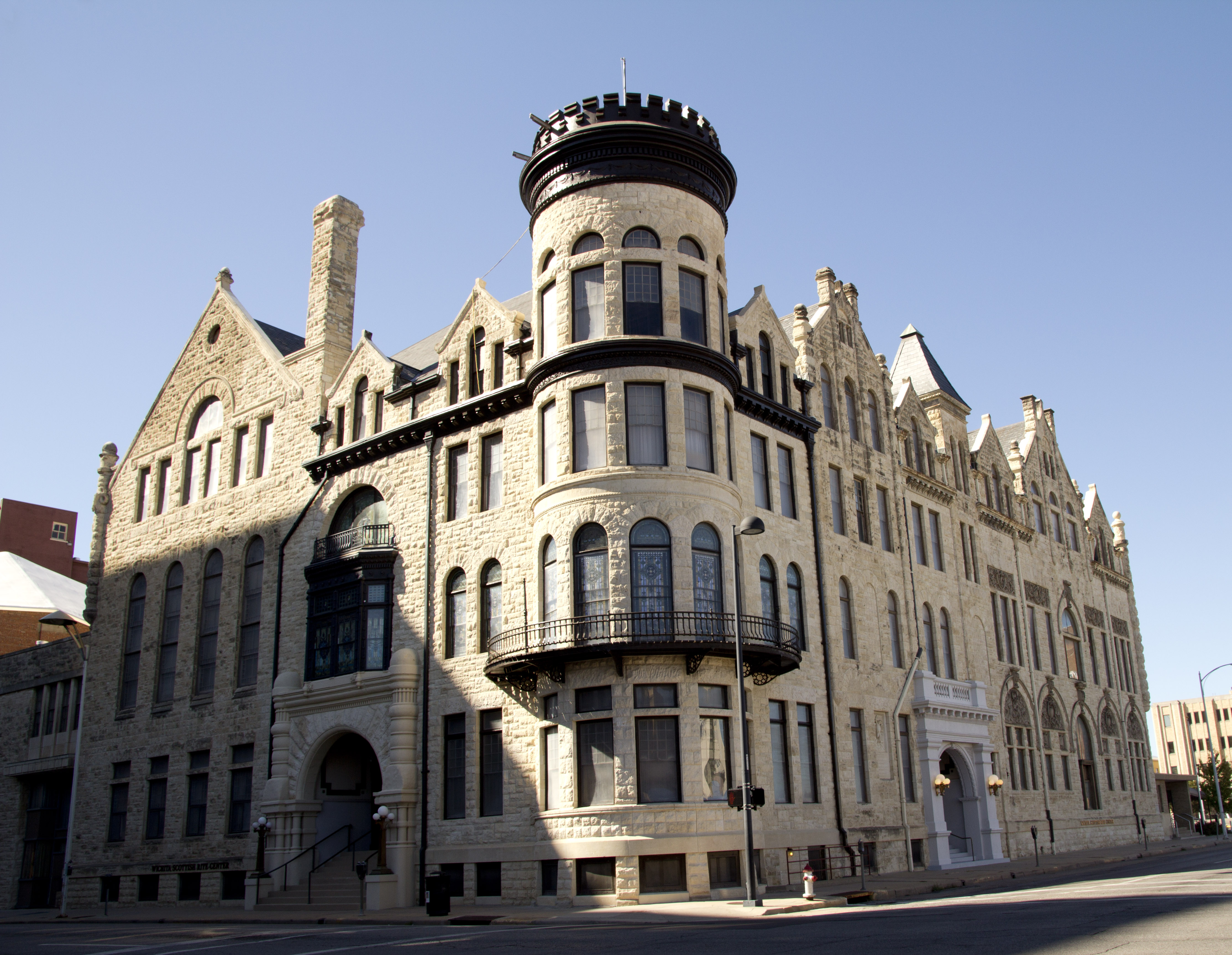
- Location: First Street at Topeka, northwest corner, Wichita, Kansas
- Coordinates: 37°41′18″N 97°20′3″W
- Area: 2 acres (0.81 ha)
- Built: 1887–1888, 1907, 1956
- Architect: Proudfoot & Bird (1887); C.W. Terry (1907)
- Architectural style: Romanesque
- NRHP reference No.: 72000527
- Added to NRHP: May 5, 1972

The Wichita Scottish Rite Center, originally known as YMCA's Building, is a historic building in the Romanesque style, located in Wichita, Kansas. Originally constructed in 1887–1888 for YMCA, the building was sold to the Scottish Rite Freemasons in 1898. It was listed on the National Register of Historic Places in 1972 as Scottish Rite Temple.

The original building was designed by architects Proudfoot & Bird of Wichita. It was expanded in 1907 and in 1956.

The 1907 expansion was an "elegant north addition" designed by Wichita architect C.W. Terry.
