= Arkansas Valley Lodge No. 21, Prince Hall Masons =

- U.S. National Register of Historic Places
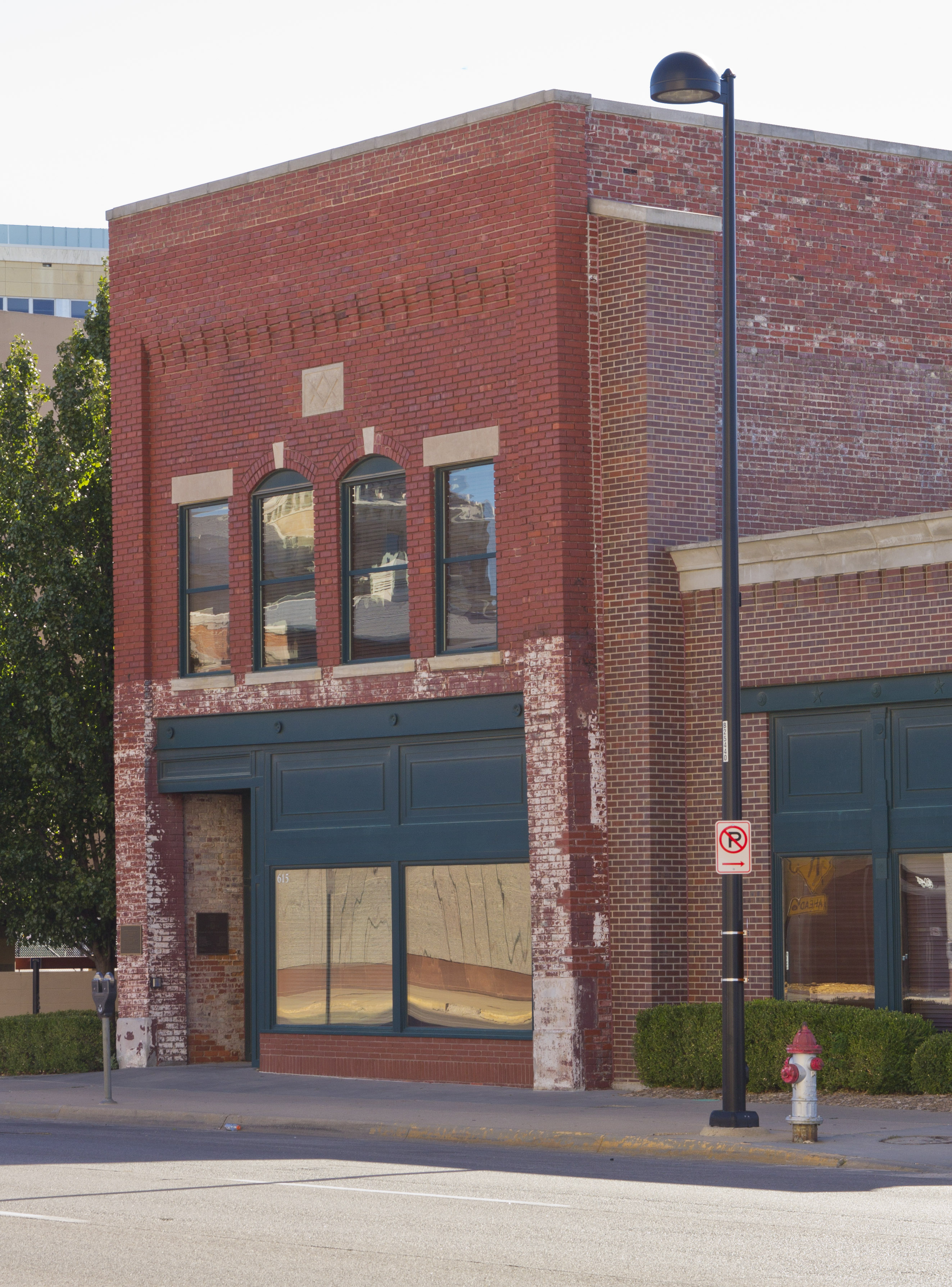

- Location within Kansas Location within the United States
- Location: 615 N. Main St., Wichita, Kansas
- Coordinates: 37°41′44″N 97°20′17″W
- Area: less than one acre
- Built: 1910
- NRHP reference No.: 77000596
- Added to NRHP: August 24, 1977

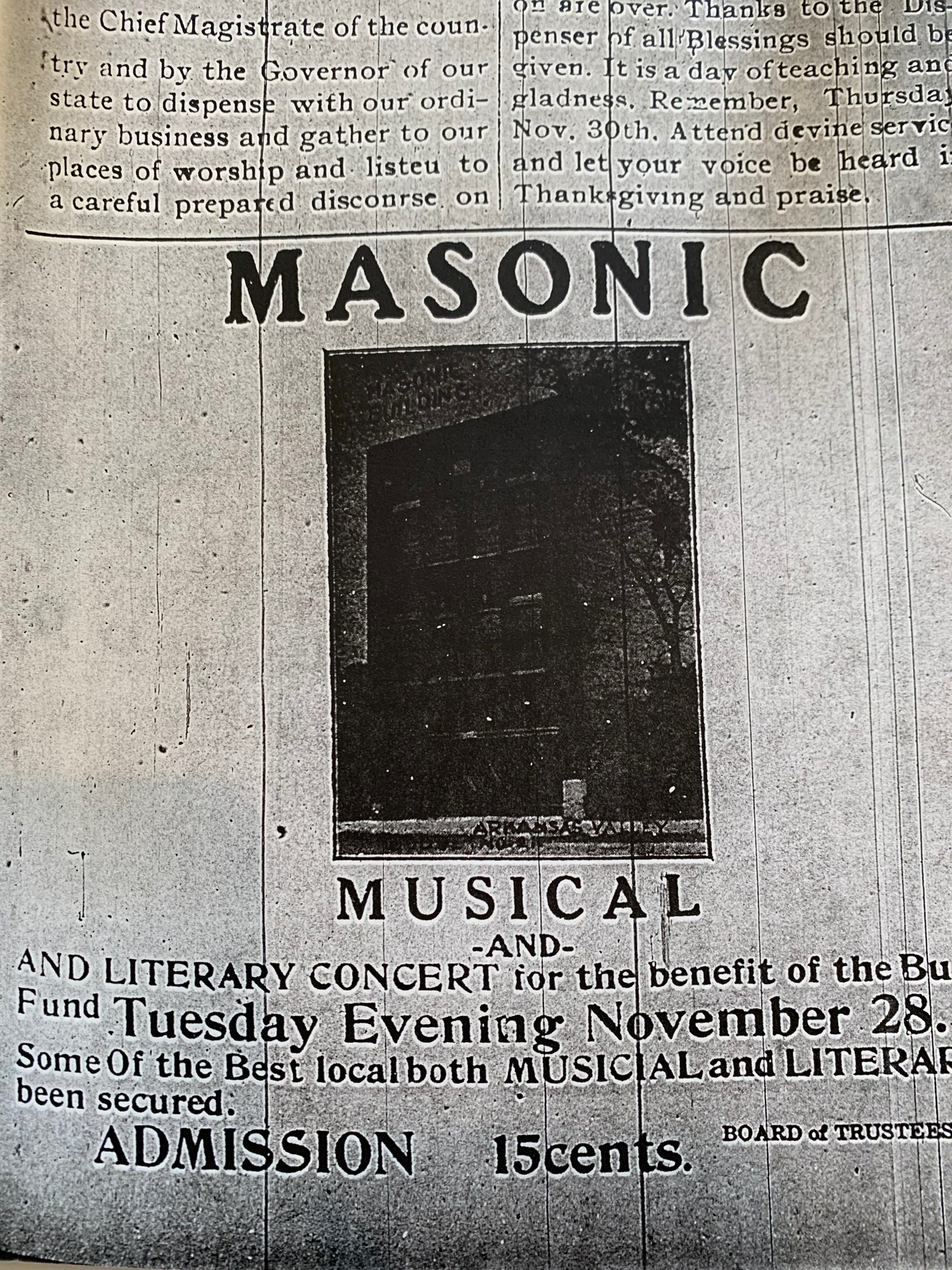
The Negro Star, Masonic Musical Benefit

The Arkansas Valley Lodge No. 21, Prince Hall Masons is a historic building in Wichita, Kansas. The lodge was chartered in 1885.

The cornerstone for the Arkansas Valley Lodge was laid on April 3, 1910. The Architect and Contractor for the building was Joshua (Josiah) Walker. Joshua (Josiah) Walker was an experienced plasterer, bricklayer and contractor as well as the operator of a real estate office and a boarding house. He was a man "well though of" and a pillar to the local black community. He had three sons Richard, Reuben and Edward. Joshua died July 24, 1923, but not after he had designed and built many other churches around 1900 including the Baptist church at Elm and Water in Wichita. Walker's brother, Sam Jones, completed the construction of the Arkansas Valley Lodge, one of the buildings built during Wichita's second "Boom Age," which began in the 1880s. The original building as designed by Joshua Walker was to consist of a 26' x 80' feet building with "thirteen inch thick walls and a concrete foundation." At the time, the Wichita Eagle simply listed J. Walker as a Plasterer and the black newspaper The Searchlight lists him as the Architect of Record.

The Beacon and the Wichita Eagle both contain accounts of the cornerstone laying from April 2 and 3 1910 in which a "daily paper, lodge archives, coins and all the accepted articles thus encased in a corner stone.." were included. The items in the cornerstone was discovered by Bradley Hardin an intern at Law Kingdon Architects in Wichita during its renovation. The items are now in display in the lobby of the building.

The building was completed with three floors. The first floor was rented to various businesses, the second floor was used as a recreation and community center and the third floor was the meeting room of the lodge, complete with a skylight. Local historian, Gerald Norwood and Mr. A.E. Titchenor a General Chairman of the lodge recount that the building originally had hardwood floors, tin ceilings and painted green window frames. According to Mr. Titchenor, the low budget for the project didn't allow for high end items with the exception of the first floor that had some chandeliers. The doors were originally trimmed in wood and the walls were white painted plaster. The Lodge underwent many renovations over the years including a plumbing renovation in 1912, the addition of a fire escape and skylight repair in 1919, a reflooring of the tile in 1955 and a new roof added in 1969.

It is unclear at what point the building went from a three-story structure to a two-story structure.

On April 29, 1974, the Urban Renewal Authority purchased the building for $28,875. The building was scheduled to be torn down in 1975, but a visiting professor at Wichita State University named Maya Angelou, the now famous poet, offered a challenge to her students to "explore black history, the forgotten history of Wichita." As a product of this movement, and after much resistance, the building was put on the local historic register in 1978.

Constructed to be a local Prince Hall Freemasons Lodge in 1910, it was listed on the National Register of Historic Places in 1977. It has also been known as Black Masonic Lodge.
