= Riverview Apartments (Wichita, Kansas) =

- U.S. National Register of Historic Places
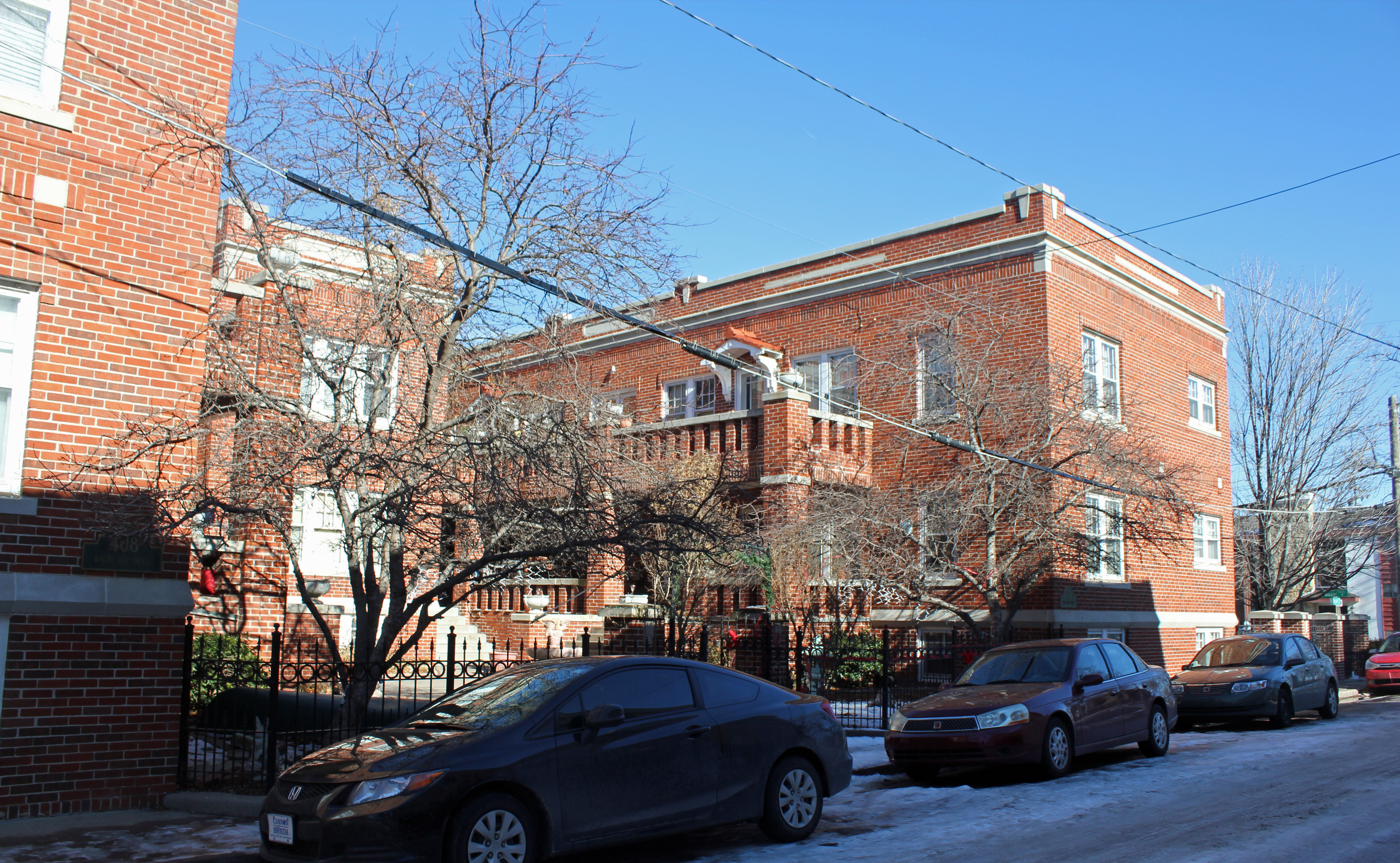
- The property in late 2013.

- Location within Kansas Location within the United States
- Location: 404–408 Back Bay Blvd., Wichita, Kansas
- Coordinates: 37°41′56″N 97°20′32″W
- Built: 1928
- Built by: Schrader, J.W.
- Architect: Schultz, William L.
- Architectural style: Late 19th And Early 20th Century American Movements
- NRHP reference No.: 02000765
- Added to NRHP: July 11, 2002

The Riverview Apartments in Wichita, Kansas were built in 1928. They were listed on the National Register of Historic Places in 2002.

The building was designed by Wichita architect William L. Schultz (c.1884–1968). The building has an E-shaped plan.
