= Bitting Building =

- U.S. National Register of Historic Places
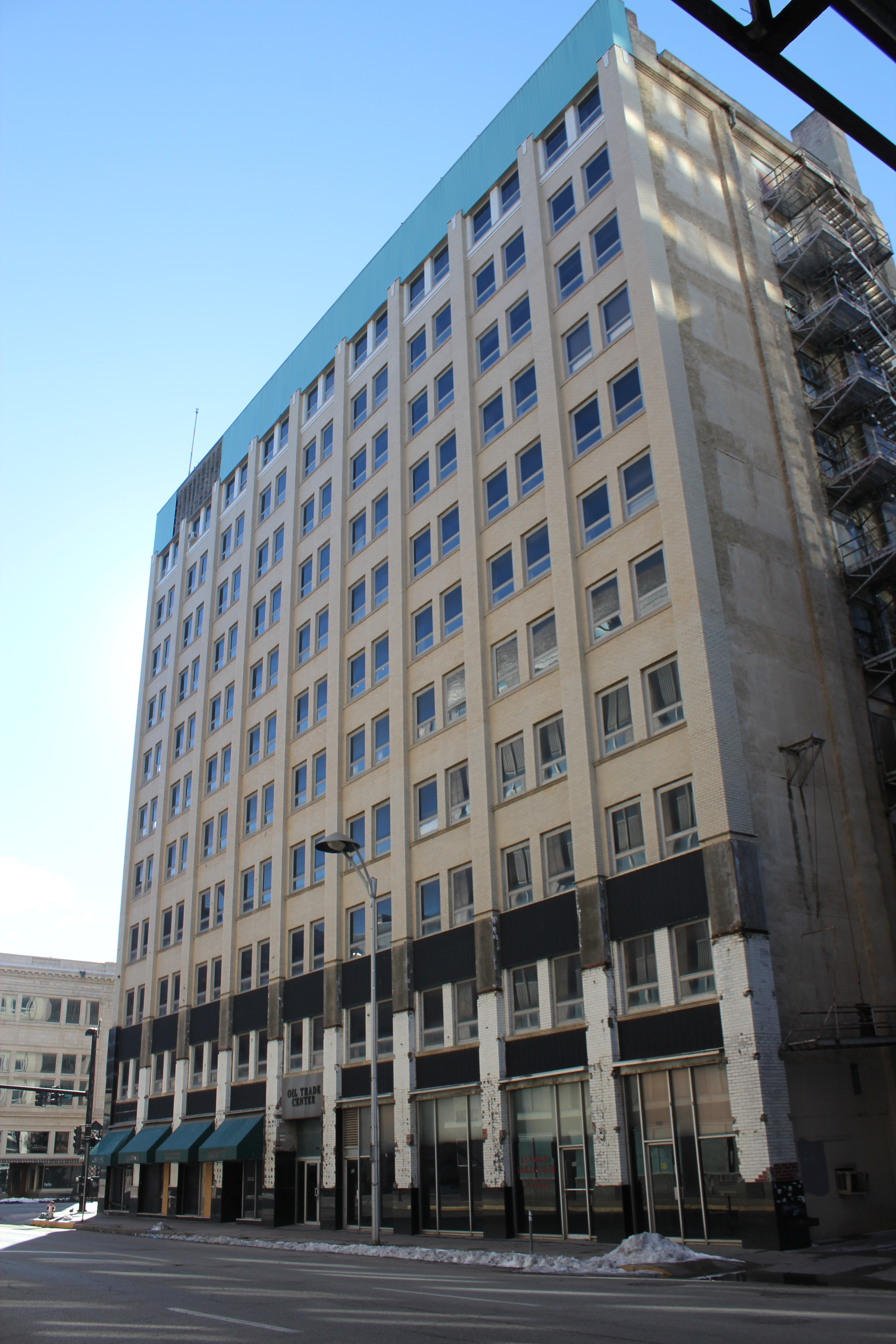
- Bitting Building in 2013

- Location within Kansas Location within the United States
- Location: 107 N. Market St., Wichita, Kansas
- Coordinates: 37°41′11″N 97°20′13″W
- Area: 0.1 acres (0.040 ha)
- Built: 1911
- Architect: Terry & Dumont (Charles W. Terry and Elbert Dumont)
- Architectural style: Skyscraper
- NRHP reference No.: 12000046
- Added to NRHP: February 28, 2012

The Bitting Building is a historic structure in Wichita, Kansas. It was built in 1912 as a four-story building replacing an earlier building on the site. Seven additional stories were added in 1919. Major renovations were carried out in 1959 and the 1980s. It was listed on the National Register of Historic Places in 2012. It is at 107 N. Market Street.

The current building was one of a series built for brothers who established a retail business and who were avid book collectors. It has 11 stores.

It sold in 1998 when it had a barber shop on its ground floor as well as retail. The top floor was occupied by an oil business and geologists had offices in the building. It was empty in 2002 and was being converted to apartments in 2015.

== See also ==
- Bitting Historic District
- National Register of Historic Places listings in Sedgwick County, Kansas
