= Ryan Township, Kansas =

Township in Sumner County, Kansas, U.S.

Ryan Township
- Township
- Location within Sumner County
- Coordinates: 37.256416°N 97.638377°W
- Country: United States
- State: Kansas
- County: Sumner
- Established: 1879

Government
  - Trustee: Garett Hagar

Area
  - Total: 35.543 sq mi (92.06 km^{2})
  - Land: 35.543 sq mi (92.06 km^{2})
  - Water: 0 sq mi (0 km^{2}) 0%

Population (2020)
  - Total: 143
  - Density: 4.02/sq mi (1.55/km^{2})
- Time zone: UTC-6 (CST)
  - Summer (DST): UTC-5 (CDT)
- Area code: 620
- GNIS feature ID: 470176

Ryan Township is a township in Sumner County, Kansas, United States. As of the 2020 census, its population was 143.

== History ==
Ryan Township was established in 1879 from part of Dixon Township.

== Geography ==
Ryan Township covers an area of 35.543 square miles (92.06 km^{2}), all of it land. The Chikaskia River flows through it, as well as Beaver Creek.

=== Communities ===
- Milan

=== Adjacent townships ===
Springdale Township, Sumner County
Creek Township, Sumner County	northwest	north	northeast	Sumner Township, Sumner County
Dixon Township, Sumner County	west	self	east	Osborne Township, Sumner County
Morris Township, Sumner County	southwest	south	southeast	Downs Township, Sumner County
Chikaskia Township, Sumner County

== Transportation ==
=== Major highways ===
- US-160
- K-49

== Demographics ==
As of the 2020 census, the township had a population of 143, giving a population density of 33.06 people per square mile (12.76 people/km^{2}). The racial makeup of the township was 88.1% White, 2.1% Asian, 0.7% Black or African American, and 9.1% from two or more races. Hispanics or Latinos of any race were 1.4% of the population.

The 2020–2024 American Community Survey estimated that the township contained 52 households and 79 housing units.
