= Seventy-Six Township, Kansas =

Township in Sumner County, Kansas, U.S.

Seventy-Six Township
- Township
- Location within Sumner County
- Coordinates: 37.347153°N 97.421815°W
- Country: United States
- State: Kansas
- County: Sumner
- Established: 1876

Government
  - Trustee: Melvin Ast

Area
  - Total: 35.305 sq mi (91.44 km^{2})
  - Land: 35.305 sq mi (91.44 km^{2})
  - Water: 0 sq mi (0 km^{2}) 0%

Population (2020)
  - Total: 274
  - Density: 7.76/sq mi (3.00/km^{2})
- Time zone: UTC-6 (CST)
  - Summer (DST): UTC-5 (CDT)
- Area code: 620
- GNIS feature ID: 470161

Seventy-Six Township is a township in Sumner County, Kansas, United States. As of the 2020 census, its population was 274.

== History ==
Seventy-Six Township was established in 1876 from parts of London Township and Wellington Township.

== Geography ==
Seventy-Six Township covers an area of 35.305 square miles (91.44 km^{2}), all of it land. The township completely surrounds an exclave of the city of Wellington, which is the Wellington Municipal Airport, that is governmentally independent from the township.

=== Communities ===
- Riverdale

=== Adjacent townships ===
London Township, Sumner County
		north
Sumner Township, Sumner County	west	self	east	Harmon Township, Sumner County
Osborne Township, Sumner County	southwest	south	southeast	Avon Township, Sumner County
Wellington Township, Sumner County

== Transportation ==
=== Major highways ===
- US-81

== Demographics ==
As of the 2020 census, the township had a population of 274, giving a population density of 33.06 people per square mile (12.76 people/km^{2}). The racial makeup of the township was 89.8% White, 2.6% Black or African American, 0.4% Asian, 0.4% Native American, 1.1% from some other race, and 5.8% from two or more races. Hispanics or Latinos of any race were 5.8% of the population.

The 2020–2024 American Community Survey estimated that the township contained 189 households and 189 housing units.
