= Conway Township, Kansas =

Township in Sumner County, Kansas, U.S.

Conway Township
- Township
- Location within Sumner County
- Coordinates: 37.431107°N 97.64203°W
- Country: United States
- State: Kansas
- County: Sumner
- Established: 1879

Government
  - Trustee: Kevin Doll

Area
  - Total: 36.285 sq mi (93.98 km^{2})
  - Land: 36.285 sq mi (93.98 km^{2})
  - Water: 0 sq mi (0 km^{2}) 0%

Population (2020)
  - Total: 1,081
  - Density: 29.79/sq mi (11.50/km^{2})
- Time zone: UTC-6 (CST)
  - Summer (DST): UTC-5 (CDT)
- Area code: 620
- GNIS feature ID: 470266

Conway Township is a township in Sumner County, Kansas, United States. As of the 2020 census, its population was 1,081.

== History ==
Conway Township was established in 1879 from part of Illinois Township.

== Geography ==
Conway Township covers an area of 36.285 square miles (93.98 square kilometers). Slate Creek flows through it.

=== Communities ===
- part of Conway Springs

=== Adjacent townships ===
Viola Township, Sedgwick County
Erie Township, Sedgwick County	northwest	north	northeast	Ninnescah Township, Sedgwick County
Eden Township, Sumner County	west	self	east	Illinois Township, Sumner County
Creek Township, Sumner County	southwest	south
Springdale Township, Sumner County

== Transportation ==
=== Major highways ===
- K-42
- K-49

== Demographics ==
As of the 2020 census, there were 1,081 people and 514 households residing in the township. The population density was 29.79 people per square mile (11.50 people/km^{2}). There were 538 housing units. The racial makeup of the township was 92.4% White, 1.1% Native American, 0.1% Asian, 0.1% Black or African American, 0.3% from some other race, and 6.0% from two or more races. Hispanics or Latinos of any race were 1.6% of the population.

There were 514 households: 48.4% were married couples living together, 10.9% had a male householder with no spouse present, and 33.9% had a female householder with no spouse present. The average family size was 3.18 people. 47.7% of people in the township older than 24 had a college degree, and the township had an employment rate of 63.4%.
