= Morris Township, Kansas =

Township in Sumner County, Kansas, U.S.

Morris Township
- Township
- Location within Sumner County
- Coordinates: 37.169061°N 97.747633°W
- Country: United States
- State: Kansas
- County: Sumner
- Established: 1879

Government
  - Trustee: Rick McGee

Area
  - Total: 36.484 sq mi (94.49 km^{2})
  - Land: 36.484 sq mi (94.49 km^{2})
  - Water: 0 sq mi (0 km^{2}) 0%

Population (2020)
  - Total: 39
  - Density: 1.1/sq mi (0.41/km^{2})
- Time zone: UTC-6 (CST)
  - Summer (DST): UTC-5 (CDT)
- Area code: 620
- GNIS feature ID: 470298

Morris Township is a township in Sumner County, Kansas, United States. As of the 2020 census, its population was 39.

== History ==
Morris Township was established in 1879 from part of Chikaskia Township.

== Geography ==
Morris Township covers an area of 36.484 square miles (94.49 km^{2}), all of it land.

=== Adjacent townships ===
Dixon Township, Sumner County
| Township 5, Harper County | northwest | north | northeast | Ryan Township, Sumner County |
| Township 4, Harper County | west | self | east | Chikaskia Township, Sumner County |
| | | south | southeast | Caldwell Township, Sumner County |
Bluff Township, Sumner County

== Transportation ==
=== Major highways ===
- K-44

== Demographics ==
As of the 2020 census, the township had a population of 39, giving a population density of 1.1 people per square mile (0.42 people/km^{2}). The racial makeup of the township was 74.4% White and 25.6% from two or more races.

The 2020–2024 American Community Survey estimated that the township contained 5 households and 5 housing units.
