= Bluff Township, Kansas =

Township in Sumner County, Kansas, U.S.

Bluff Township
- Township
- Location within Sumner County
- Coordinates: 37.061925°N 97.747643°W
- Country: United States
- State: Kansas
- County: Sumner
- Established: 1878

Government
  - Trustee: Duane Nulik

Area
  - Total: 52.601 sq mi (136.24 km^{2})
  - Land: 52.601 sq mi (136.24 km^{2})
  - Water: 0 sq mi (0 km^{2}) 0%

Population (2020)
  - Total: 59
  - Density: 1.1/sq mi (0.43/km^{2})
- Time zone: UTC-6 (CST)
  - Summer (DST): UTC-5 (CDT)
- Area code: 620
- GNIS feature ID: 470094

Bluff Township is a township in Sumner County, Kansas, United States. As of the 2020 census, its population was 59.

== History ==
Bluff Township was established in 1878 from part of Caldwell Township.

== Geography ==
Bluff Township covers an area of 52.601 square miles (136.24 square kilometers). Bluff Creek flows through it.

=== Adjacent townships ===
Morris Township, Sumner County
		north	northeast	Chikaskia Township, Sumner County
Township 4, Harper County	west	self	east	Caldwell Township, Sumner County
		south
Grant County, Oklahoma

== Demographics ==
As of the 2020 census, there were 59 people and 26 households residing in the township. The population density was 1.1 people per square mile (0.42 people/km^{2}). There were 39 housing units. The racial makeup of the township was 84.7% White, 1.7% Native American, 1.7% Asian, and 11.9% from two or more races.

There were 26 households: 65.4% were married couples living together, 26.9% had a male householder with no spouse present, and 7.7% had a female householder with no spouse present. The average family size was 2.82 people. 73.7% of people in the township older than 24 had a college degree, and the township had an employment rate of 65.8%.
