= Ohio Township, Sedgwick County, Kansas =

Township in Sedgwick County, Kansas, U.S.

Ohio Township Sedgwick County, Kansas
- Township
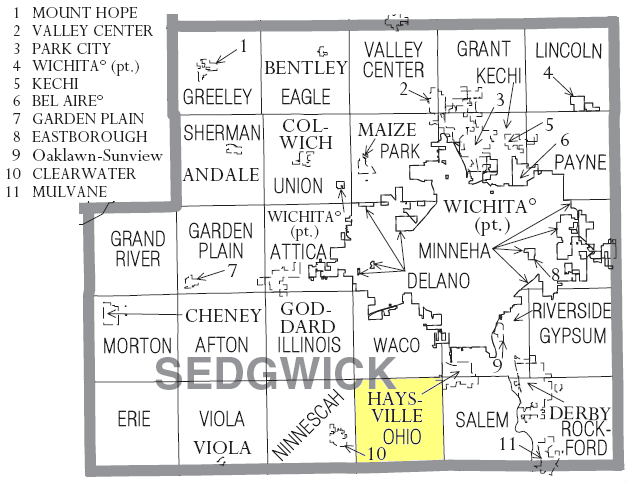
- Location within Sedgwick County

- Location within state of Kansas
- Coordinates: 37°31′15″N 97°25′26″W
- Country: United States
- State: Kansas
- County: Sedgwick
- Founded: 1873
- Named for: Ohio

Government
  - District 2 County Commissioner: Jeff Blubaugh

Area
  - Total: 36.16 sq mi (93.7 km^{2})
  - Land: 36.11 sq mi (93.5 km^{2})
  - Water: 0.05 sq mi (0.13 km^{2})
- Elevation: 1,270 ft (390 m)

Population (2020)
  - Total: 2,159
  - Density: 59.79/sq mi (23.08/km^{2})
- Time zone: UTC-6 (CST)
  - Summer (DST): UTC-5 (CDT)
- Area code: 620
- FIPS code: 20-52450
- GNIS ID: 474325

Ohio Township is a township in Sedgwick County, Kansas, United States. As of the 2020 census, its population was 2,159.

== History ==
Ohio Township was established on March 8, 1873. The first settler in what was to become Ohio Township was E. H. Brown, who settled there in 1870. Many of its original settlers were from the state of Ohio, which is where the township gets its name.

== Geography ==
Spring Creek flows through the township.

=== Communities ===
- part of Haysville
- part of Peck
- Bayneville

=== Adjacent townships ===
Waco Township, Sedgwick County
Illinois Township, Sedgwick County	northwest	north	northeast	Riverside Township, Sedgwick County
Ninnescah Township, Sedgwick County	west	self	east	Salem Township, Sedgwick County
Illinois Township, Sumner County	southwest	south
London Township, Sumner County
