= Dixon Township, Kansas =

Township in Sumner County, Kansas, U.S.

Dixon Township
- Township
- Location within Sumner County
- Coordinates: 37.256307°N 97.747344°W
- Country: United States
- State: Kansas
- County: Sumner
- Established: 1877

Government
  - Trustee: Dan Warner

Area
  - Total: 36.473 sq mi (94.46 km^{2})
  - Land: 36.473 sq mi (94.46 km^{2})
  - Water: 0 sq mi (0 km^{2}) 0%

Population (2020)
  - Total: 606
  - Density: 16.6/sq mi (6.42/km^{2})
- Time zone: UTC-6 (CST)
  - Summer (DST): UTC-5 (CDT)
- Area code: 620
- GNIS feature ID: 470182

Dixon Township is a township in Sumner County, Kansas, United States. As of the 2020 census, its population was 606.

== History ==
Dixon Township was established in 1877 from part of Chikaskia Township. In 1879, Ryan Township was created from part of Dixon Township.

== Geography ==
Dixon Township covers an area of 36.473 square miles (94.46 km^{2}), all of it land. The Chikaskia River flows through it, as well as Spring Creek, Argonia Creek, and Sand Creek.

=== Communities ===
- Argonia

=== Adjacent townships ===
Creek Township, Sumner County
Township 6, Harper County	northwest	north	northeast	Springdale Township, Sumner County
Township 5, Harper County	west	self	east	Ryan Township, Sumner County
Township 4, Harper County	southwest	south	southeast	Chikaskia Township, Sumner County
Morris Township, Sumner County

== Transportation ==
=== Major highways ===
- US-160

== Demographics ==
As of the 2020 census, the township had a population of 1,081, giving a population density of 29.79 people per square mile (11.50 people/km^{2}). The racial makeup of the township was 92.4% White, 1.1% Native American, 0.1% Asian, 0.1% Black or African American, 0.3% from some other race, and 6.0% from two or more races. Hispanics or Latinos of any race were 1.6% of the population.

The 2020–2024 American Community Survey estimated that the township contained 313 households and 389 housing units.
