= London Township, Kansas =

Township in Sumner County, Kansas, U.S.

London Township
- Township
- Location within Sumner County
- Coordinates: 37.425925°N 97.41307°W
- Country: United States
- State: Kansas
- County: Sumner
- Established: 1871

Government
  - Trustee: Jeffrey Potucek

Area
  - Total: 41.791 sq mi (108.24 km^{2})
  - Land: 41.406 sq mi (107.24 km^{2})
  - Water: 0.385 sq mi (1.00 km^{2}) 0.92%

Population (2020)
  - Total: 694
  - Density: 16.8/sq mi (6.47/km^{2})
- Time zone: UTC-6 (CST)
  - Summer (DST): UTC-5 (CDT)
- Area code: 316 and 620
- GNIS feature ID: 470246

London Township is a township in Sumner County, Kansas, United States. As of the 2020 census, its population was 694.

== History ==
London Township was established in 1871. In 1876, part of Seventy-Six Township was created from part of London Township. In 1877, Illinois Township was created from part of London Township. London Township eventually annexed a part of Belle Plaine Township. London Township was home to two towns that are now extinct: Boon, whose post office was in operation from January 20, 1879 to March 11, 1887, and London, whose post office was in operation from 1871 to 1887. London had a peak population of 30 people in 1880.

== Geography ==
London Township covers an area of 41.791 square miles (108.24 km^{2}), with 0.92% being water. The Ninnescah River flows through it, as well as Elm Creek and Spring Creek.

=== Communities ===
- part of Peck
- Zyba

=== Adjacent townships ===
Ohio Township, Sedgwick County
Ninnescah Township, Sedgwick County	northwest	north	northeast	Salem Township, Sedgwick County
Illinois Township, Sumner County	west	self	east	Belle Plaine Township, Sumner County
Sumner Township, Sumner County	southwest	south	southeast	Harmon Township, Sumner County
Seventy-Six Township, Sumner County

== Transportation ==
=== Major highways ===
- US-81

== Demographics ==
As of the 2020 census, the township had a population of 694, giving a population density of 16.8 people per square mile (6.5 people/km^{2}). The racial makeup of the township was 89.8% White, 1.7% Native American, 0.6% Black or African American, 0.4% Asian, 0.7% from some other race, and 6.8% from two or more races. Hispanics or Latinos of any race were 4.6% of the population.

The 2020–2024 American Community Survey estimated that the township contained 187 households and 266 housing units.
