= Salem Township, Sedgwick County, Kansas =

Township in Sedgwick County, Kansas, U.S.

Salem Township Sedgwick County, Kansas
- Township
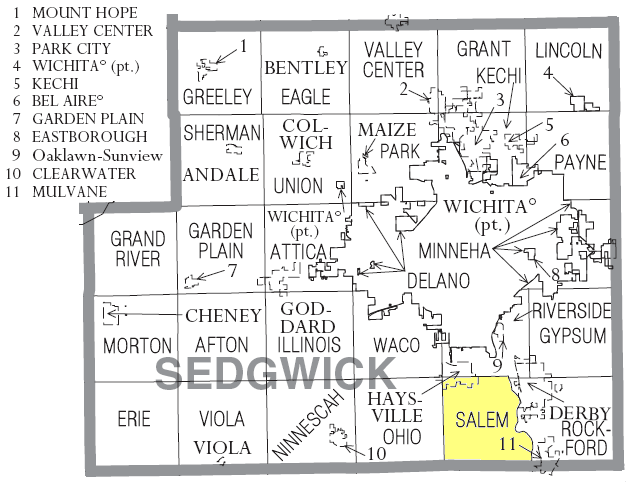
- Location within Sedgwick County

- Location within state of Kansas
- Coordinates: 37°31′15″N 97°18′56″W
- Country: United States
- State: Kansas
- County: Sedgwick
- Founded: 1871

Government
  - District 2 County Commissioner: Jeff Blubaugh

Area
  - Total: 32.136 sq mi (83.23 km^{2})
  - Land: 31.906 sq mi (82.64 km^{2})
  - Water: 0.23 sq mi (0.60 km^{2}) 0.72%
- Elevation: 1,240 ft (380 m)

Population (2020)
  - Total: 9,368
  - Density: 293.6/sq mi (113.4/km^{2})
- Time zone: UTC-6 (CST)
  - Summer (DST): UTC-5 (CDT)
- Area code: 620
- FIPS code: 20-62675
- GNIS ID: 474324
- Website: salemtownship.us

Salem Township is a township in Sedgwick County, Kansas, United States. As of the 2020 census, its population was 9,368. It is located south of Wichita.

== History ==
Salem Township was established in 1871. The first settler in what was to become Salem Township was W. F. Ransom, who settled there in November 1869.

== Geography ==
The Arkansas River and MS Mitch Mitchell Floodway flow through the township.

=== Communities ===
- part of Haysville
- part of Mulvane
- part of Peck
- Waco

=== Adjacent townships ===
Riverside Township, Sedgwick County
Waco Township, Sedgwick County	northwest	north
Ohio Township, Sedgwick County	west	self	east	Rockford Township, Sedgwick County
London Township, Sumner County	southwest	south	southeast	Gore Township, Sumner County
Belle Plaine Township, Sumner County

== Transportation ==
=== Major highways ===
- I-35 / Kansas Turnpike
- US-81
- K-53
