= Illinois Township, Sumner County, Kansas =

Township in Sumner County, Kansas, U.S.

Illinois Township
- Township
- Location within Sumner County
- Coordinates: 37.41964°N 97.539622°W
- Country: United States
- State: Kansas
- County: Sumner
- Established: 1877

Government
  - Trustee: Clint Van Allen

Area
  - Total: 36.413 sq mi (94.31 km^{2})
  - Land: 36.401 sq mi (94.28 km^{2})
  - Water: 0.012 sq mi (0.031 km^{2}) 0.03%

Population (2020)
  - Total: 171
  - Density: 4.70/sq mi (1.81/km^{2})
- Time zone: UTC-6 (CST)
  - Summer (DST): UTC-5 (CDT)
- Area code: 620
- GNIS feature ID: 470261

Illinois Township is a township in Sumner County, Kansas, United States. As of the 2020 census, its population was 171.

== History ==
Illinois Township was established in 1877 from part of London Township. In 1878, Eden Township was created from part of Illinois Township. In 1879, Conway Township was created from part of Illinois Township as well. Illinois Township was home to two now extinct towns: Beverly, whose post office was in operation from 1878 to 1885, and Sunny Slope, whose post office was in operation from 1877 to 1884. Beverly had a peak population of over 800 in 1880. Sunny Slope had a peak population of around 100 people in 1880.

== Geography ==
Illinois Township covers an area of 36.413 square miles (94.31 km^{2}), with 0.03% being water. The Ninnescah River flows through it.

=== Communities ===
- Millerton

=== Adjacent townships ===
Ninnescah Township, Sedgwick County
Viola Township, Sedgwick County	northwest	north	northeast	Ohio Township, Sedgwick County
Conway Township, Sumner County	west	self	east	London Township, Sumner County
Springdale Township, Sumner County	southwest	south
Sumner Township, Sumner County

== Demographics ==
As of the 2020 census, the township had a population of 171, giving a population density of 4.70 people per square mile (1.81 people/km^{2}). The racial makeup of the township was 93.0% White, 1.2% Native American, 0.6% from some other race, and 5.3% from two or more races. Hispanics or Latinos of any race were 2.3% of the population.

The 2020–2024 American Community Survey estimated that the township contained 55 households and 55 housing units.
