= Osborne Township, Sumner County, Kansas =

Township in Sumner County, Kansas, U.S.

Osborne Township
- Township
- Location within Sumner County
- Coordinates: 37.25907°N 97.530572°W
- Country: United States
- State: Kansas
- County: Sumner
- Established: 1877

Government
  - Trustee: Jed Tencleve

Area
  - Total: 34.439 sq mi (89.20 km^{2})
  - Land: 34.439 sq mi (89.20 km^{2})
  - Water: 0 sq mi (0 km^{2}) 0%

Population (2020)
  - Total: 226
  - Density: 6.56/sq mi (2.53/km^{2})
- Time zone: UTC-6 (CST)
  - Summer (DST): UTC-5 (CDT)
- Area code: 620
- GNIS feature ID: 485520

Osborne Township is a township in Sumner County, Kansas, United States. As of the 2020 census, its population was 226.

== History ==
Osborne Township was established in 1877 from parts of Chikaskia Township and Wellington Township. Osborne Township was home to two towns that are now extinct: Orie, whose post office was in operation from 1877 to 1893, and Marengo, whose post office was in operation from 1877 to 1880. Orie had a peak population of 50 people in 1880. Marengo was originally called Bellevue until March 15, 1878.

== Geography ==
Osborne Township covers an area of 34.439 square miles (89.20 km^{2}), all of it land. Slate Creek flows through it.

=== Communities ===
- Mayfield

=== Adjacent townships ===
Sumner Township, Sumner County
Springdale Township, Sumner County	northwest	north	northeast	Seventy-Six Township, Sumner County
Ryan Township, Sumner County	west	self	east	Wellington Township, Sumner County
Chikaskia Township, Sumner County	southwest	south	southeast	Jackson Township, Sumner County
Downs Township, Sumner County

== Transportation ==
=== Major highways ===
- US-160
- K-49

== Demographics ==
As of the 2020 census, the township had a population of 226, giving a population density of 6.56 people per square mile (2.53 people/km^{2}). The racial makeup of the township was 89.4% White, 0.4% Asian, and 10.2% from two or more races. Hispanics or Latinos of any race were 2.2% of the population.

The 2020–2024 American Community Survey estimated that the township contained 57 households and 73 housing units.
