= Afton Township, Kansas =

Township in Sedgwick County, Kansas, U.S.

Afton Township Sedgwick County, Kansas
- Township
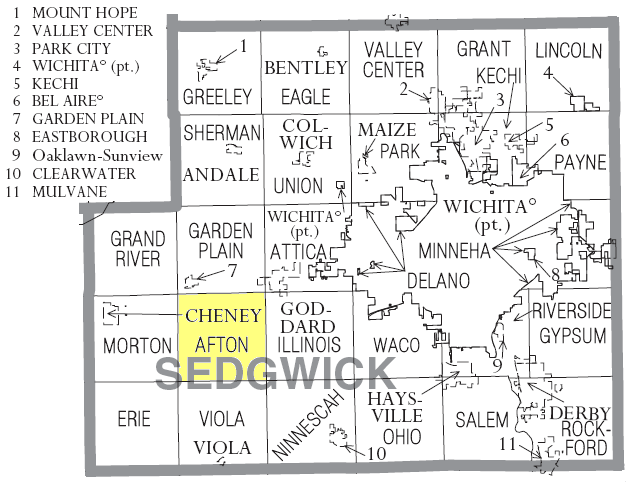
- Location within Sedgwick County

- Location within state of Kansas
- Coordinates: 37°36′10″N 97°37′54″W
- Country: United States
- State: Kansas
- County: Sedgwick
- Founded: 1874

Government
  - District 3 County Commissioner: Stephanie Wise

Area
  - Total: 35.9 sq mi (93.0 km^{2})
  - Land: 35.3 sq mi (91.4 km^{2})
  - Water: 0.62 sq mi (1.6 km^{2})
- Elevation: 1,371 ft (418 m)

Population (2020)
  - Total: 1,563
  - Density: 44.3/sq mi (17.1/km^{2})
- Time zone: UTC-6 (CST)
  - Summer (DST): UTC-5 (CDT)
- Area code: 316
- FIPS code: 20-00425
- GNIS ID: 473997

Afton Township is a township in Sedgwick County, Kansas, United States. As of the 2020 census, its population was 1,536.

== History ==
Afton Township was established in October of 1874 by William Lyman. The first settler in what was to become Afton Township was Albert Southard, who settled there in 1872.

== Geography ==
Lake Afton lies in the township, as well as Lake Waltanna. The Ninnescah River and Clearwater Creek flow through the township as well. Lake Afton Public Observatory also lies within the township.

=== Adjacent townships ===
Garden Plain Township, Sedgwick County
Grand River Township, Sedgwick County	northwest	north	northeast	Attica Township, Sedgwick County
Morton Township, Sedgwick County	west	self	east	Illinois Township, Sedgwick County
Erie Township, Sedgwick County	southwest	south	southeast	Ninnescah Township, Sedgwick County
Viola Township, Sedgwick County
