= Illinois Township, Sedgwick County, Kansas =

Township in Sedgwick County, Kansas, U.S.

Illinois Township Sedgwick County, Kansas
- Township
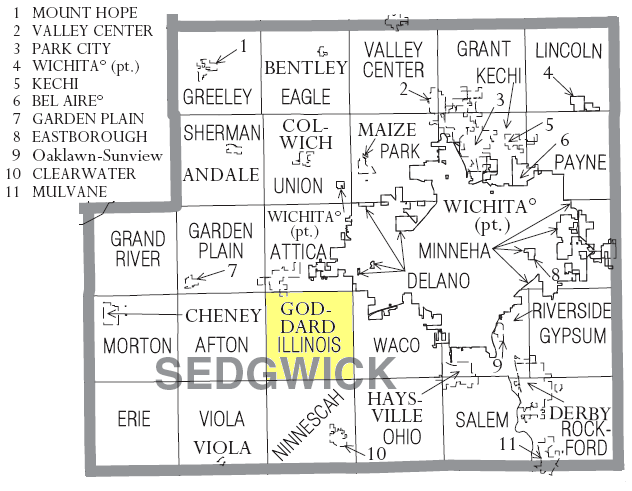
- Location within Sedgwick County

- Location within state of Kansas
- Coordinates: 37°36′25″N 97°32′06″W
- Country: United States
- State: Kansas
- County: Sedgwick
- Founded: 1873
- Named for: Illinois

Government
  - District 3 County Commissioner: Stephanie Wise

Area
  - Total: 35.447 sq mi (91.81 km^{2})
  - Land: 35.404 sq mi (91.70 km^{2})
  - Water: 0.043 sq mi (0.11 km^{2}) 0.12%
- Elevation: 1,378 ft (420 m)

Population (2020)
  - Total: 1,999
  - Density: 56.46/sq mi (21.80/km^{2})
- Time zone: UTC-6 (CST)
  - Summer (DST): UTC-5 (CDT)
- Area code: 316
- FIPS code: 20-33775
- GNIS ID: 474006

Illinois Township is a township in Sedgwick County, Kansas, United States. As of the 2020 census, its population was 1,999.

== History ==
Illinois Township was established in 1873. The first settler in what was to become Illinois Township was William Spencer, who settled there in 1871. The township was named after the state of Illinois as many of the original settlers were from there.

== Geography ==
=== Communities ===
- part of Goddard
- Clonmel

=== Adjacent townships ===
Attica Township, Sedgwick County
| Garden Plain Township, Sedgwick County | northwest | north |
| Afton Township, Sedgwick County | west | self | east | Waco Township, Sedgwick County |
| Viola Township, Sedgwick County | southwest | south | southeast | Ohio Township, Sedgwick County |
Ninnescah Township, Sedgwick County

== Transportation ==
=== Major highways ===
- K-42
