= Viola, Kansas =

City in Sedgwick County, Kansas

- City
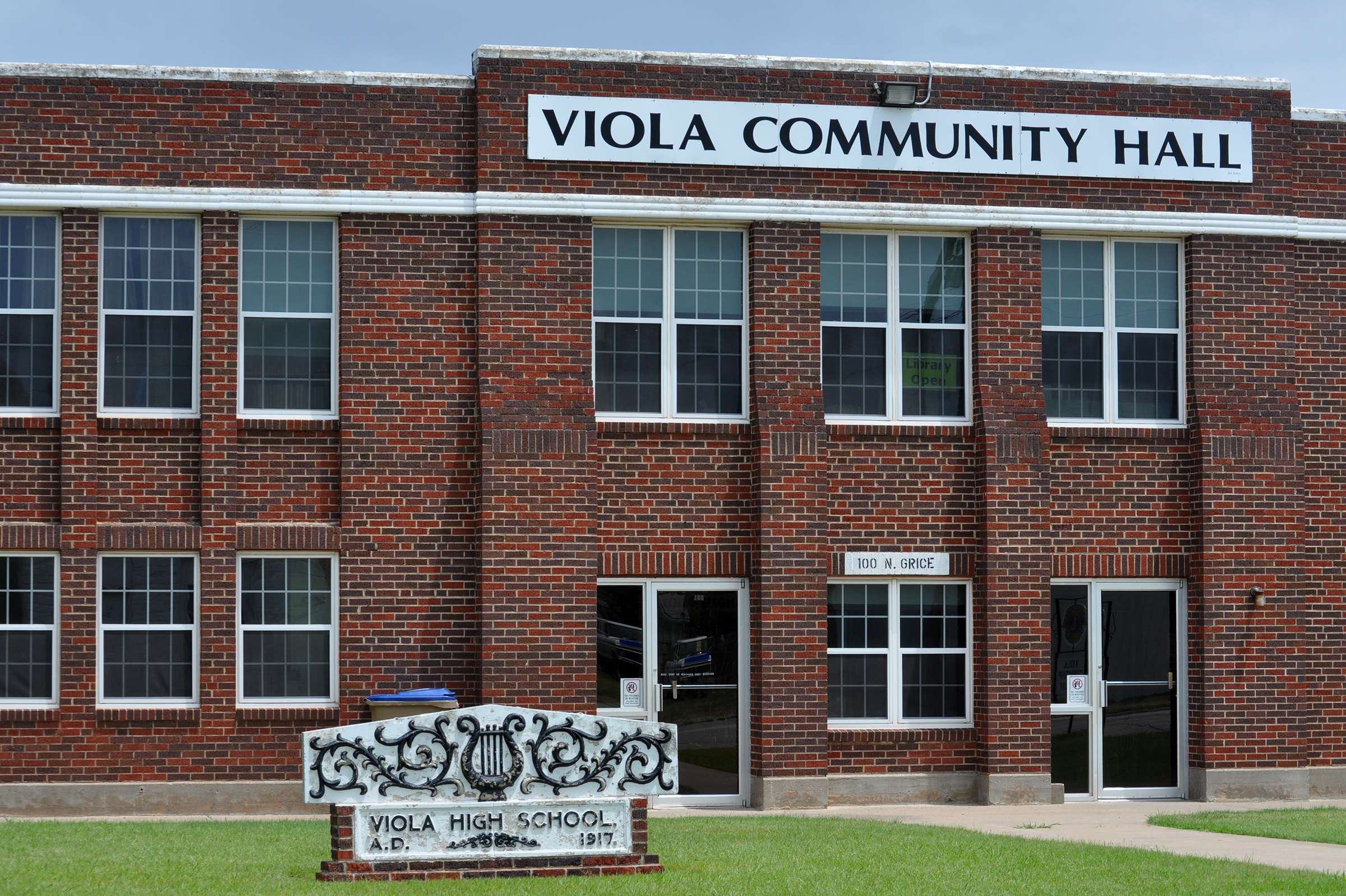
- Former High School is now Community Center (2015)

- Location within Sedgwick County and Kansas

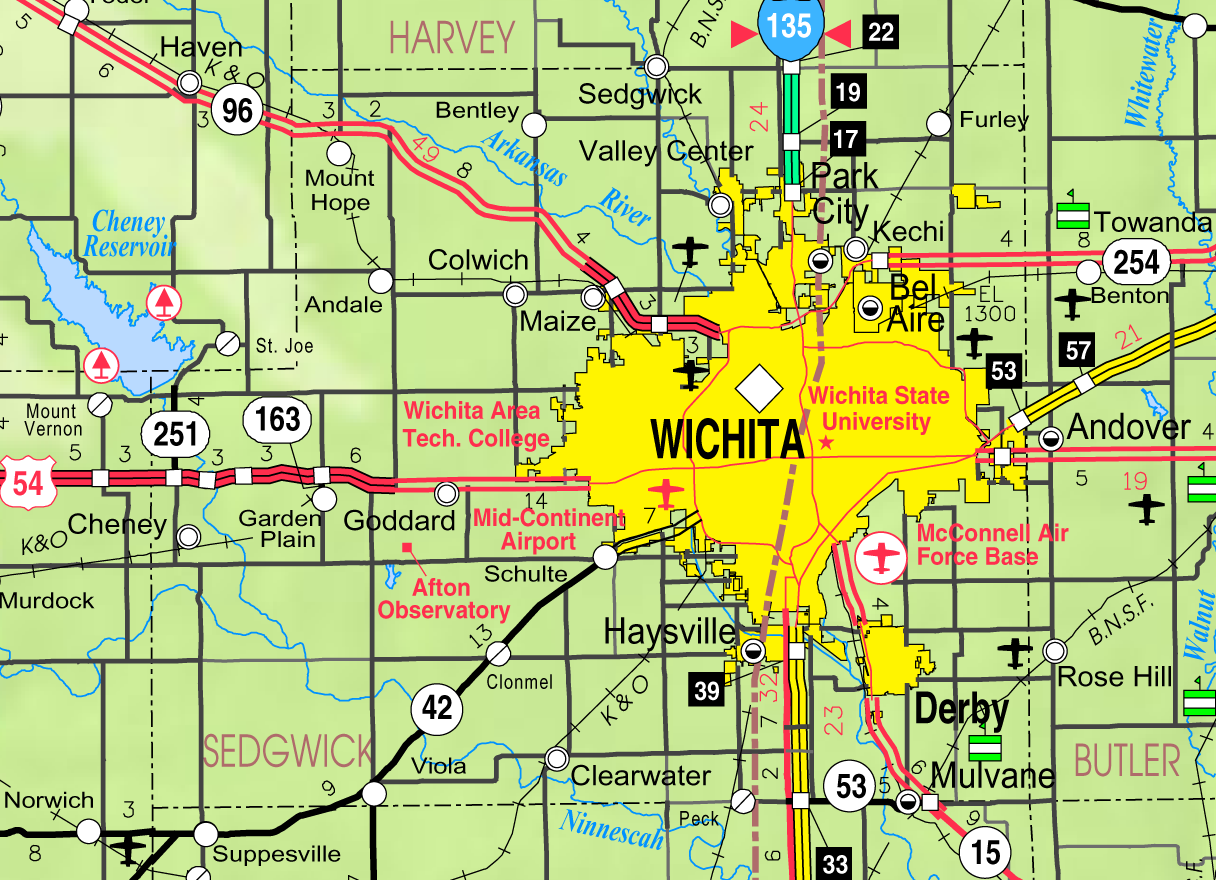
- KDOT map of Sedgwick County (legend)
- Coordinates: 37°29′1″N 97°38′42″W
- Country: United States
- State: Kansas
- County: Sedgwick
- Township: Viola
- Founded: 1870s
- Incorporated: 1909

Area
  - Total: 0.17 sq mi (0.43 km^{2})
  - Land: 0.17 sq mi (0.43 km^{2})
  - Water: 0 sq mi (0.00 km^{2})
- Elevation: 1,339 ft (408 m)

Population (2020)
  - Total: 115
  - Density: 690/sq mi (270/km^{2})
- Time zone: UTC-6 (CST)
  - Summer (DST): UTC-5 (CDT)
- ZIP Code: 67149
- Area code: 620
- FIPS code: 20-74025
- GNIS ID: 470265

Viola is a city in Sedgwick County, Kansas, United States. As of the 2020 census, the population of the city was 115.

== History ==
Viola had its start when the Englewood branch of the Santa Fe railroad was extended to that point.

The first post office at Viola was established in 1877, but the post office was called Peotone until 1899.

== Geography ==
Viola is located at 37°29′1″N 97°38′42″W (37.483526, -97.644918). It is southwest of Wichita on Highway 42 at the intersection of Highway 49. According to the United States Census Bureau, the city has a total area of 0.16 square miles (0.41 km^{2}), all land.

== Demographics ==
Historical population
| Census | Pop. | Note | %± |
|---|---|---|---|
| 1880 | 290 | | — |
| 1890 | 537 | | 85.2% |
| 1900 | 510 | | −5.0% |
| 1910 | 517 | | 1.4% |
| 1920 | 173 | | −66.5% |
| 1930 | 159 | | −8.1% |
| 1940 | 131 | | −17.6% |
| 1950 | 132 | | 0.8% |
| 1960 | 203 | | 53.8% |
| 1970 | 193 | | −4.9% |
| 1980 | 199 | | 3.1% |
| 1990 | 185 | | −7.0% |
| 2000 | 211 | | 14.1% |
| 2010 | 130 | | −38.4% |
| 2020 | 115 | | −11.5% |
U.S. Decennial Census

=== 2010 census ===
As of the census of 2010, there were 130 people, 51 households, and 37 families living in the city. The population density was 812.5 inhabitants per square mile (313.7/km^{2}). There were 64 housing units at an average density of 400.0 per square mile (154.4/km^{2}). The racial makeup of the city was 91.5% White, 1.5% African American, 1.5% Native American, 1.5% from other races, and 3.8% from two or more races. Hispanic or Latino of any race were 8.5% of the population.

There were 51 households, of which 37.3% had children under the age of 18 living with them, 66.7% were married couples living together, 5.9% had a female householder with no husband present, and 27.5% were non-families. 19.6% of all households were made up of individuals, and 7.8% had someone living alone who was 65 years of age or older. The average household size was 2.55 and the average family size was 2.89.

The median age in the city was 38.7 years. 23.8% of residents were under the age of 18; 10% were between the ages of 18 and 24; 21.5% were from 25 to 44; 26.8% were from 45 to 64; and 17.7% were 65 years of age or older. The gender makeup of the city was 50.8% male and 49.2% female.

=== 2000 census ===
As of the census of 2000, there were 211 people, 74 households, and 56 families living in the city. The population density was 1,331.7 inhabitants per square mile (514.2/km^{2}). There were 79 housing units at an average density of 498.6 per square mile (192.5/km^{2}). The racial makeup of the city was 96.21% White, 2.37% Native American, 0.47% from other races, and 0.95% from two or more races. Hispanic or Latino of any race were 1.42% of the population.

There were 74 households, out of which 41.9% had children under the age of 18 living with them, 55.4% were married couples living together, 14.9% had a female householder with no husband present, and 24.3% were non-families. 21.6% of all households were made up of individuals, and 8.1% had someone living alone who was 65 years of age or older. The average household size was 2.85 and the average family size was 3.25.

In the city, the population was spread out, with 36.0% under the age of 18, 8.1% from 18 to 24, 25.6% from 25 to 44, 19.9% from 45 to 64, and 10.4% who were 65 years of age or older. The median age was 32 years. For every 100 females, there were 99.1 males. For every 100 females age 18 and over, there were 101.5 males.

The median income for a household in the city was $45,469, and the median income for a family was $47,031. Males had a median income of $42,000 versus $20,625 for females. The per capita income for the city was $16,804. About 3.4% of families and 7.9% of the population were below the poverty line, including 15.4% of those under the age of eighteen and none of those 65 or over.

== Education ==
The community is served by Conway Springs USD 356 public school district.

Viola High School was closed through school unification. The Viola High School mascot was Bulldogs.

== Parks and recreation ==
- Lake Afton

== Transportation ==
The Atchison, Topeka and Santa Fe Railway formerly provided passenger rail service to Viola on a line between Wichita and Englewood. Dedicated passenger service was provided until at least 1958, while mixed trains continued until at least 1961. As of 2025, the nearest passenger rail station is located in Newton, where Amtrak's Southwest Chief stops once daily on a route from Chicago to Los Angeles.
