= Viola Township, Kansas =

Township in Sedgwick County, Kansas, U.S.

Viola Township Sedgwick County, Kansas
- Township
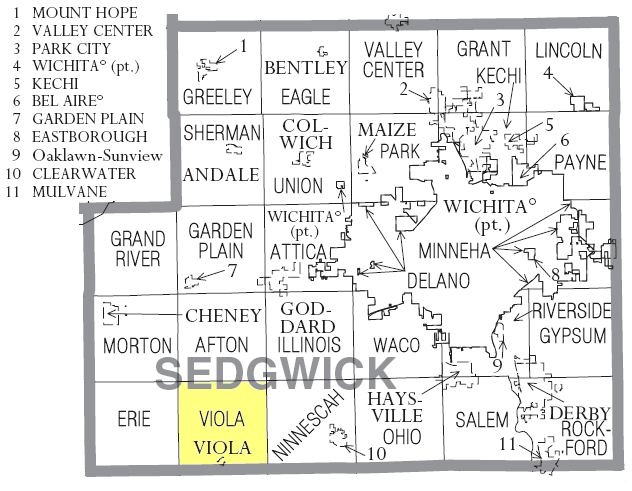
- Location within Sedgwick County

- Location within state of Kansas
- Coordinates: 37°31′05″N 97°38′36″W
- Country: United States
- State: Kansas
- County: Sedgwick
- Founded: 1876

Government
  - District 3 County Commissioner: Stephanie Wise

Area
  - Total: 36.43 sq mi (94.4 km^{2})
  - Land: 36.07 sq mi (93.4 km^{2})
  - Water: 0.36 sq mi (0.93 km^{2})
- Elevation: 1,316 ft (401 m)

Population (2020)
  - Total: 497
  - Density: 13.8/sq mi (5.32/km^{2})
- Time zone: UTC-6 (CST)
  - Summer (DST): UTC-5 (CDT)
- Area code: 620
- FIPS code: 20-74050
- GNIS ID: 474308

Viola Township is a township in Sedgwick County, Kansas, United States. As of the 2020 census, its population was 497.

== History ==
Viola Township was established in 1876. The first settlers in what was to become Viola Township was C. Wood Davis and his two sons, who settled there in May 1870.

== Geography ==
The Ninnescah River flows through the township, as well as Sand Creek.

=== Communities ===
- Viola

=== Adjacent townships ===
Afton Township, Sedgwick County
Morton Township, Sedgwick County	northwest	north	northeast	Illinois Township, Sedgwick County
Erie Township, Sedgwick County	west	self	east	Ninnescah Township, Sedgwick County
Eden Township, Sumner County	southwest	south	southeast	Illinois Township, Sumner County
Conway Township, Sumner County

== Transportation ==
=== Major highways ===
- K-42
- K-49
