= Clonmel, Kansas =

Unincorporated community in Kansas, US

- Unincorporated community
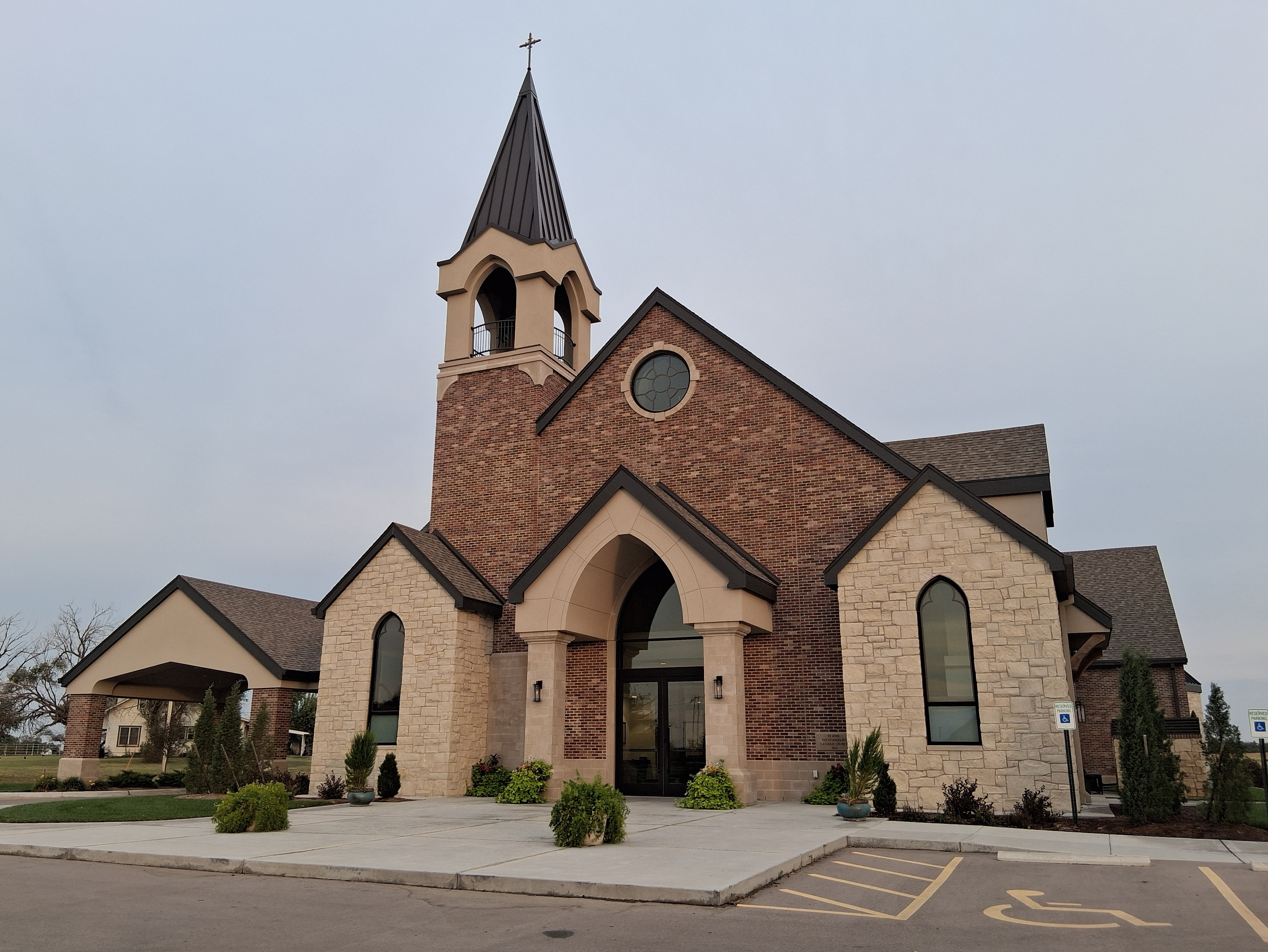
- St. John the Evangelist Church in 2026

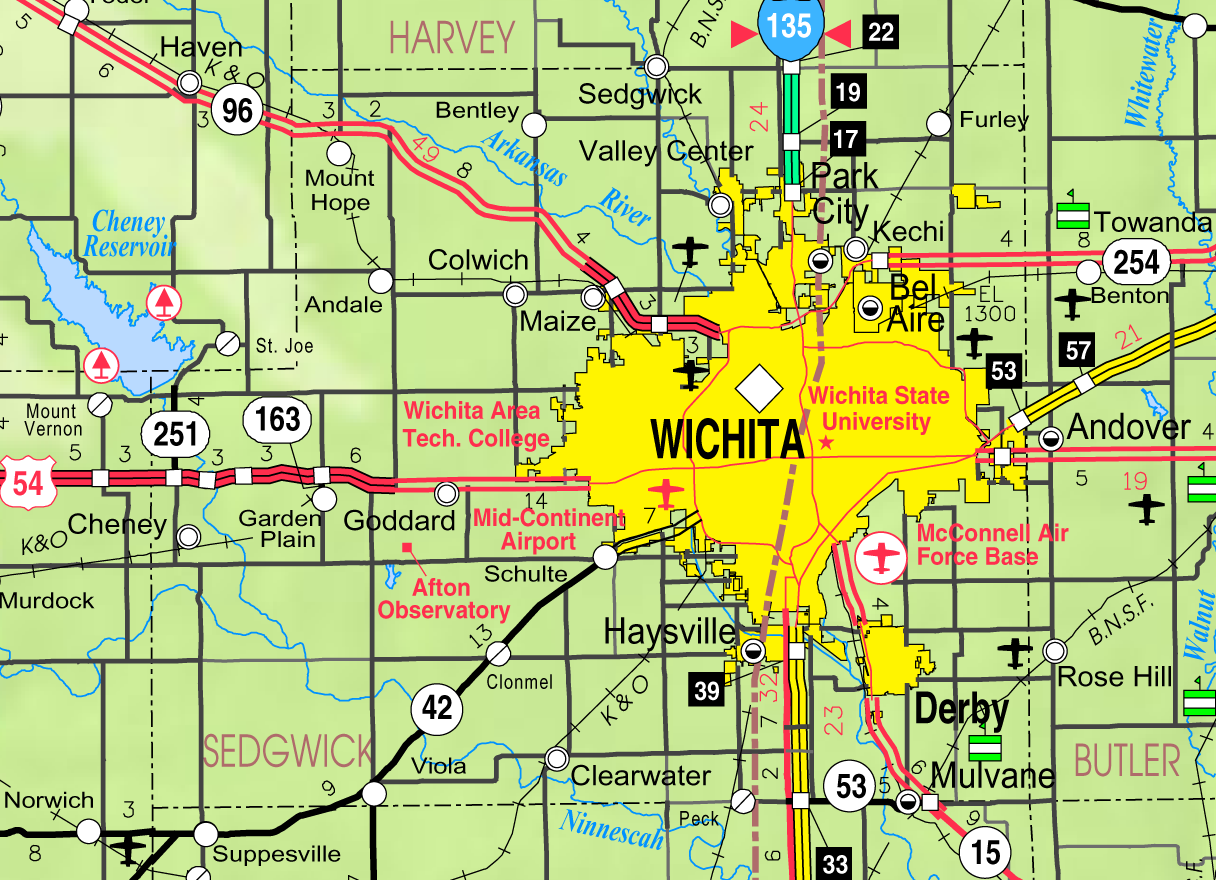
- KDOT map of Sedgwick County (legend)

- Location within Kansas Location within the United States
- Coordinates: 37°33′46″N 97°33′14″W
- Country: United States
- State: Kansas
- County: Sedgwick
- Township: Illinois
- Elevation: 1,371 ft (418 m)
- Time zone: UTC-6 (CST)
  - Summer (DST): UTC-5 (CDT)
- ZIP Code: 67149
- Area code: 620
- FIPS code: 20-14375
- GNIS ID: 484677

Clonmel is an unincorporated community in Illinois Township, Sedgwick County, Kansas, United States. It is located at Highway K42 and W 71st St S.

== History ==
Clonmel was a station on the Kansas City, Mexico and Orient Railway.

A post office was opened in Clonmel in 1905, and remained in operation until it was discontinued in 1938. It was named after Clonmel in Ireland.

== Education ==
The community is served by Clearwater USD 264 public school district.

== Transportation ==
The Atchison, Topeka and Santa Fe Railway formerly provided passenger rail service to Clonmel on a line between Wichita and Englewood. Dedicated passenger service was provided until at least 1958, while mixed trains continued until at least 1961. As of 2025, the nearest passenger rail station is located in Newton, where Amtrak's Southwest Chief stops once daily on a route from Chicago to Los Angeles.
