= Waco Township, Kansas =

Township in Sedgwick County, Kansas, U.S.

Waco Township Sedgwick County, Kansas
- Township
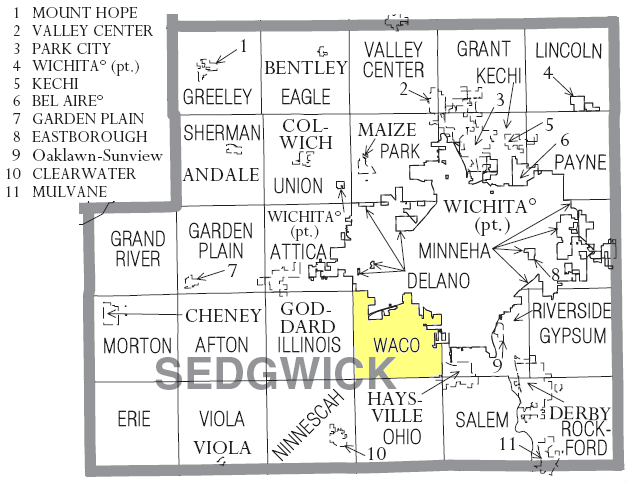
- Location within Sedgwick County

- Location within state of Kansas
- Coordinates: 37°36′30″N 97°25′31″W
- Country: United States
- State: Kansas
- County: Sedgwick
- Founded: 1871

Government
  - District 2 County Commissioner: Jeff Blubaugh

Area
  - Total: 24.649 sq mi (63.84 km^{2})
  - Land: 24.5 sq mi (63 km^{2})
  - Water: 0.149 sq mi (0.39 km^{2}) 0.60%
- Elevation: 1,309 ft (399 m)

Population (2020)
  - Total: 660
  - Density: 27/sq mi (10/km^{2})
- Time zone: UTC-6 (CST)
  - Summer (DST): UTC-5 (CDT)
- Area code: 620
- FIPS code: 20-74300
- GNIS ID: 474181

Waco Township is a township in Sedgwick County, Kansas, United States. As of the 2020 census, its population was 660.

== History ==
Waco Township was established on May 2, 1871. Riverside Township was created from part of Gypsum Township and Waco Township in the 1910s.

== Geography ==
The MS Mitch Mitchell Floodway flows through the township, as well as Cowskin Creek. Several exclaves of the city of Wichita are completely surrounded by Waco Township.

=== Communities ===
- part of Haysville
- part of Schulte

=== Adjacent townships ===
Attica Township, Sedgwick County	northwest
Illinois Township, Sedgwick County	west	self	east	Riverside Township, Sedgwick County
Ninnescah Township, Sedgwick County	southwest	south	southeast	Salem Township, Sedgwick County
Ohio Township, Sedgwick County

== Transportation ==
Part of the Wichita Dwight D. Eisenhower National Airport lies within the township.

=== Major highways ===
- K-42
