= Ewell, Kansas =

Ghost town in Kansas, U.S.

Coordinates: 37°20′24″N 97°41′26″W

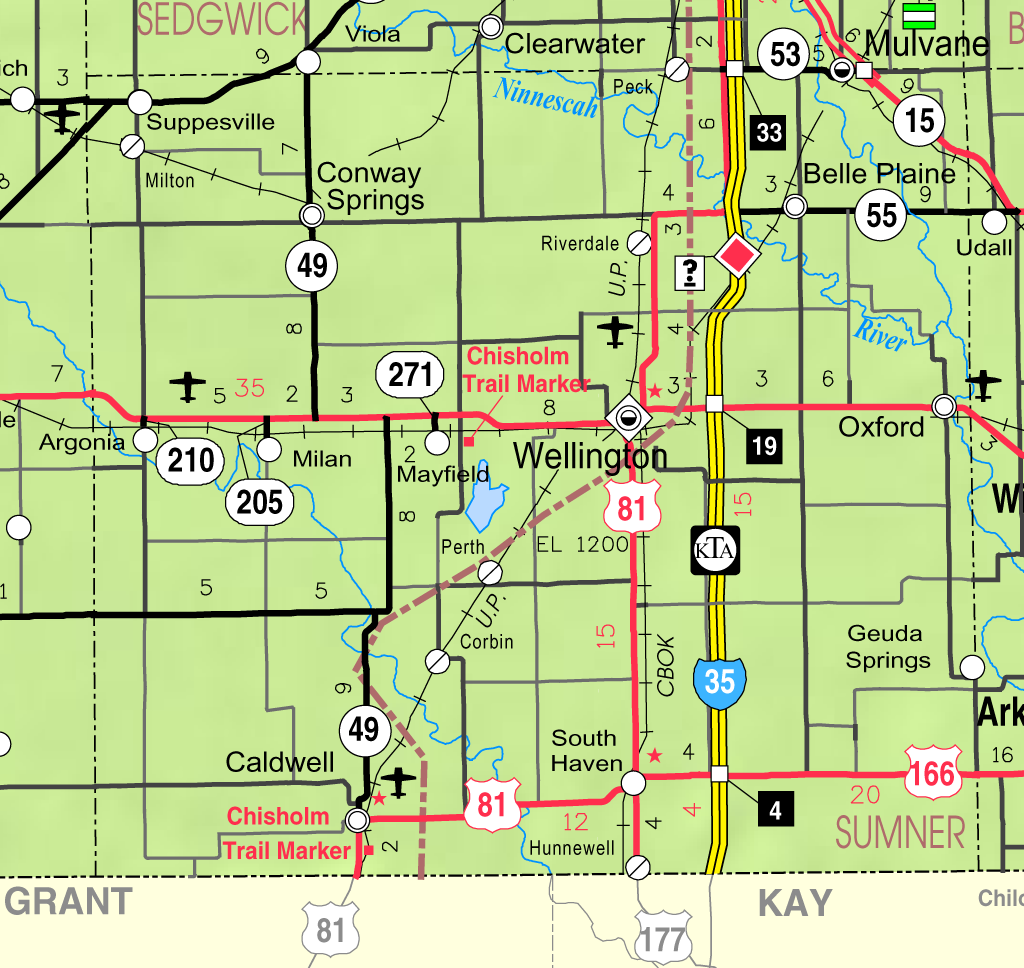
KDOT map of Sumner County (legend)

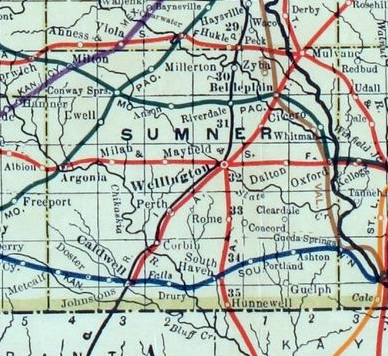
1915 railroad map of Sumner County

Ewell is a ghost town in Sumner County, Kansas, United States. It is located about 3.5 miles southwest of Conway Springs at 0.25 mile southeast of the intersection of N Bluff Rd and W 60th Ave N, next to an abandoned railroad.

== History ==
Ewell was located next to a former railroad between Conway Springs and Argonia.

Ewell had a post office between 1885 and 1906.

This community no longer exists, though a modern home and its buildings exist on the site.

== Education ==
The rural area around the former community is currently served by Conway Springs USD 356 public school district.

== See also ==
- List of ghost towns in Kansas
