= Harmon Township, Kansas =

Township in Sumner County, Kansas, U.S.

Harmon Township
- Township
- Location within Sumner County
- Coordinates: 37.342226°N 97.316352°W
- Country: United States
- State: Kansas
- County: Sumner

Government
  - Trustee: Lindley Zimmerman

Area
  - Total: 30.609 sq mi (79.28 km^{2})
  - Land: 30.609 sq mi (79.28 km^{2})
  - Water: 0 sq mi (0 km^{2}) 0%

Population (2020)
  - Total: 235
  - Density: 7.68/sq mi (2.96/km^{2})
- Time zone: UTC-6 (CST)
  - Summer (DST): UTC-5 (CDT)
- Area code: 620 and 316
- GNIS feature ID: 470140

Harmon Township is a township in Sumner County, Kansas, United States. As of the 2020 census, its population was 235.

== History ==
Harmon Township was established from part of Belle Plaine Township.

== Geography ==
Harmon Township covers an area of 30.609 square miles (79.28 km^{2}), all of it land. The Ninnescah River flows through it, as well as Dry Creek.

=== Communities ===
- Cicero

=== Adjacent townships ===
Belle Plaine Township, Sumner County
London Township, Sumner County	northwest	north
Seventy-Six Township, Sumner County	west	self	east	Palestine Township, Sumner County
Wellington Township, Sumner County	southwest	south	southeast	Oxford Township, Sumner County
Avon Township, Sumner County

== Transportation ==
=== Major highways ===
- I-35 / Kansas Turnpike
- US-81

== Demographics ==
As of the 2020 census, the township had a population of 235, giving a population density of 7.68 people per square mile (2.97 people/km^{2}). The racial makeup of the township was 91.1% White, 0.9% Native American, 0.9% Black or African American, 0.9% from some other race, and 6.4% from two or more races. Hispanics or Latinos of any race were 4.3% of the population.

The 2020–2024 American Community Survey estimated that the township contained 52 households and 52 housing units.
