= Clearwater USD 264 =

Public school district in Kansas, US

Address
- 151 S. 1st Ave. Clearwater, Kansas, 67026; United States
- Coordinates: 37°30′14″N 97°30′6″W

District information
- Type: Public
- Grades: Pre-K to 12
- Schools: 3

Other information
- Website: usd264.org

Clearwater USD 264 is a public unified school district headquartered in Clearwater, Kansas, United States. The district includes the communities of Clearwater, Bayneville, Clonmel, Millerton, and nearby rural areas.

== Schools ==
The school district operates the following schools:

- Clearwater High School
- Clearwater Intermediate-Middle School
- Clearwater Elementary West School

== See also ==
- Kansas State Department of Education
- Kansas State High School Activities Association
- List of high schools in Kansas
- List of unified school districts in Kansas
