= Creek Township, Kansas =

Township in Sumner County, Kansas, U.S.

Creek Township
- Township
- Location within Sumner County
- Coordinates: 37.342788°N 97.747902°W
- Country: United States
- State: Kansas
- County: Sumner

Government
  - Trustee: Christopher Stevens

Area
  - Total: 36.648 sq mi (94.92 km^{2})
  - Land: 36.629 sq mi (94.87 km^{2})
  - Water: 0.019 sq mi (0.049 km^{2}) 0.05%

Population (2020)
  - Total: 181
  - Density: 4.94/sq mi (1.91/km^{2})
- Time zone: UTC-6 (CST)
  - Summer (DST): UTC-5 (CDT)
- Area code: 620
- GNIS feature ID: 470181

Creek Township is a township in Sumner County, Kansas, United States. As of the 2020 census, its population was 181.

== History ==
Creek Township was created from part of Springdale Township.

== Geography ==
Creek Township covers an area of 36.648 square miles (94.92 square kilometers). Argonia Creek flows through it.

=== Adjacent townships ===
Eden Township, Sumner County
		north	northeast	Conway Township, Sumner County
Township 6, Harper County	west	self	east	Springdale Township, Sumner County
Township 5, Harper County	southwest	south	southeast	Ryan Township, Sumner County
Dixon Township, Sumner County

== Demographics ==
As of the 2020 census, there were 181 people and 42 households residing in the township. The population density was 4.94 people per square mile (1.91 people/km^{2}). There were 42 housing units. The racial makeup of the township was 93.4% White, 1.7% from some other race, and 5.0% from two or more races. Hispanics or Latinos of any race were 2.2% of the population.

There were 42 households: 81.0% were married couples living together and 19,0% had a male householder with no spouse present. The average family size was 2.24 people. 38.8% of people in the township older than 24 had a college degree, and the township had an employment rate of 76.1%.
