= Caldwell USD 360 =

Public school district in Caldwell, Kansas

Address
- 22 N. Webb St. Caldwell, Kansas, 67022; United States
- Coordinates: 37°1′59″N 97°36′37″W

District information
- Type: Public
- Grades: K to 12
- Schools: 2

Other information
- Website: usd360.com

Caldwell USD 360 is a public unified school district headquartered in Caldwell, Kansas, United States. The district includes the communities of Caldwell, Corbin, Drury, and nearby rural areas.

== Schools ==
The school district operates the following schools:

- Caldwell Middle/High School
- Caldwell Elementary School

== See also ==
- Kansas State Department of Education
- Kansas State High School Activities Association
- List of high schools in Kansas
- List of unified school districts in Kansas
