= Bayneville, Kansas =

Unincorporated community in Sedgwick County, Kansas

Coordinates: 37°33′15″N 97°26′38″W

Bayneville is an unincorporated community in Ohio Township, Sedgwick County, Kansas, United States. It is located on S 87th W between W 71st S and W 79st S.

== History ==
Bayneville had its start by the building of the Missouri Pacific Railroad through that territory. It was named for Judge Bayne, a railroad promoter.

A post office was opened in Bayneville in 1884, and remained in operation until it was discontinued in 1934.

== Education ==
The community is served by Clearwater USD 264 public school district.
