= Wellington Township, Kansas =

Township in Sumner County, Kansas, U.S.

Wellington Township
- Township
- Location within Sumner County
- Coordinates: 37.255482°N 97.424219°W
- Country: United States
- State: Kansas
- County: Sumner
- Established: 1871

Government
  - Trustee: Steve Brown

Area
  - Total: 30.614 sq mi (79.29 km^{2})
  - Land: 30.595 sq mi (79.24 km^{2})
  - Water: 0.019 sq mi (0.049 km^{2}) 0.06%

Population (2020)
  - Total: 284
  - Density: 9.28/sq mi (3.58/km^{2})
- Time zone: UTC-6 (CST)
  - Summer (DST): UTC-5 (CDT)
- Area code: 620
- GNIS feature ID: 470157

Wellington Township is a township in Sumner County, Kansas, United States. As of the 2020 census, its population was 284.

== History ==
Wellington Township was established in 1871. In 1876, part of Seventy-Six Township was created from part of Wellington Township. In 1877, part of Osborne Township was created from part of Wellington Township.

== Geography ==
Wellington Township covers an area of 30.614 square miles (79.29 km^{2}), 0.06% of it water. Slate Creek and Beaver Creek flow through it. The township almost completely surrounds the city of Wellington, although the city is governmentally independent from it.

=== Adjacent townships ===
Seventy-Six Township, Sumner County
| Sumner Township, Sumner County | northwest | north | northeast | Harmon Township, Sumner County |
| Osborne Township, Sumner County | west | self | east | Avon Township, Sumner County |
| Downs Township, Sumner County | southwest | south | southeast | Greene Township, Sumner County |
Jackson Township, Sumner County

== Transportation ==
=== Major highways ===
- US-81
- US-160

== Demographics ==
As of the 2020 census, the township had a population of 284, giving a population density of 9.28 people per square mile (3.58 people/km^{2}). The racial makeup of the township was 94.0% White, 1.4% Black or African American, 0.4% Native American, 1.4% from some other race, and 2.8% from two or more races. Hispanics or Latinos of any race were 3.2% of the population.

The 2020–2024 American Community Survey estimated that the township contained 81 households and 104 housing units.
