= Ninnescah Township, Sedgwick County, Kansas =

Township in Sedgwick County, Kansas, U.S.

Ninnescah Township Sedgwick County, Kansas
- Township
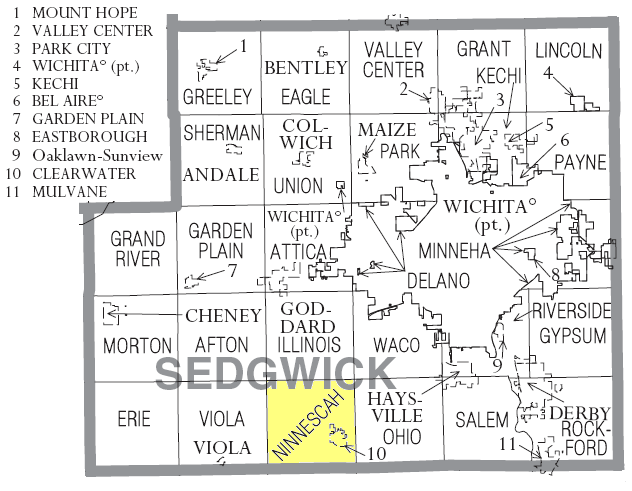
- Location within Sedgwick County

- Location within state of Kansas
- Coordinates: 37°31′05″N 97°32′01″W
- Country: United States
- State: Kansas
- County: Sedgwick
- Founded: 1872
- Named for: Ninnescah River

Government
  - District 2 County Commissioner: Jeff Blubaugh

Area
  - Total: 36.14 sq mi (93.6 km^{2})
  - Land: 35.97 sq mi (93.2 km^{2})
  - Water: 0.17 sq mi (0.44 km^{2})
- Elevation: 1,293 ft (394 m)

Population (2020)
  - Total: 3,376
  - Density: 93.86/sq mi (36.24/km^{2})
- Time zone: UTC-6 (CST)
  - Summer (DST): UTC-5 (CDT)
- Area code: 620
- FIPS code: 20-50725
- GNIS ID: 470254

Ninnescah Township is a township in Sedgwick County, Kansas, United States. As of the 2020 census, its population was 3,376.

== History ==
Ninnescah Township was established in October of 1872. The first settler in what was to become Ninnescah Township was Edward Murray, an immigrant from County Down, Ireland, who settled there in the winter of 1869. It is named after the Ninnescah River.

== Geography ==
The Ninnescah River flows through the township.

=== Communities ===
- Clearwater

=== Adjacent townships ===
Illinois Township, Sedgwick County
Afton Township, Sedgwick County	northwest	north	northeast	Waco Township, Sedgwick County
Viola Township, Sedgwick County	west	self	east	Ohio Township, Sedgwick County
Conway Township, Sumner County	southwest	south	southeast	London Township, Sumner County
Illinois Township, Sumner County

== Transportation ==
=== Major highways ===
- K-42
