= Mayfield, Kansas =

City in Sumner County, Kansas

- City
- Location within Sumner County and Kansas

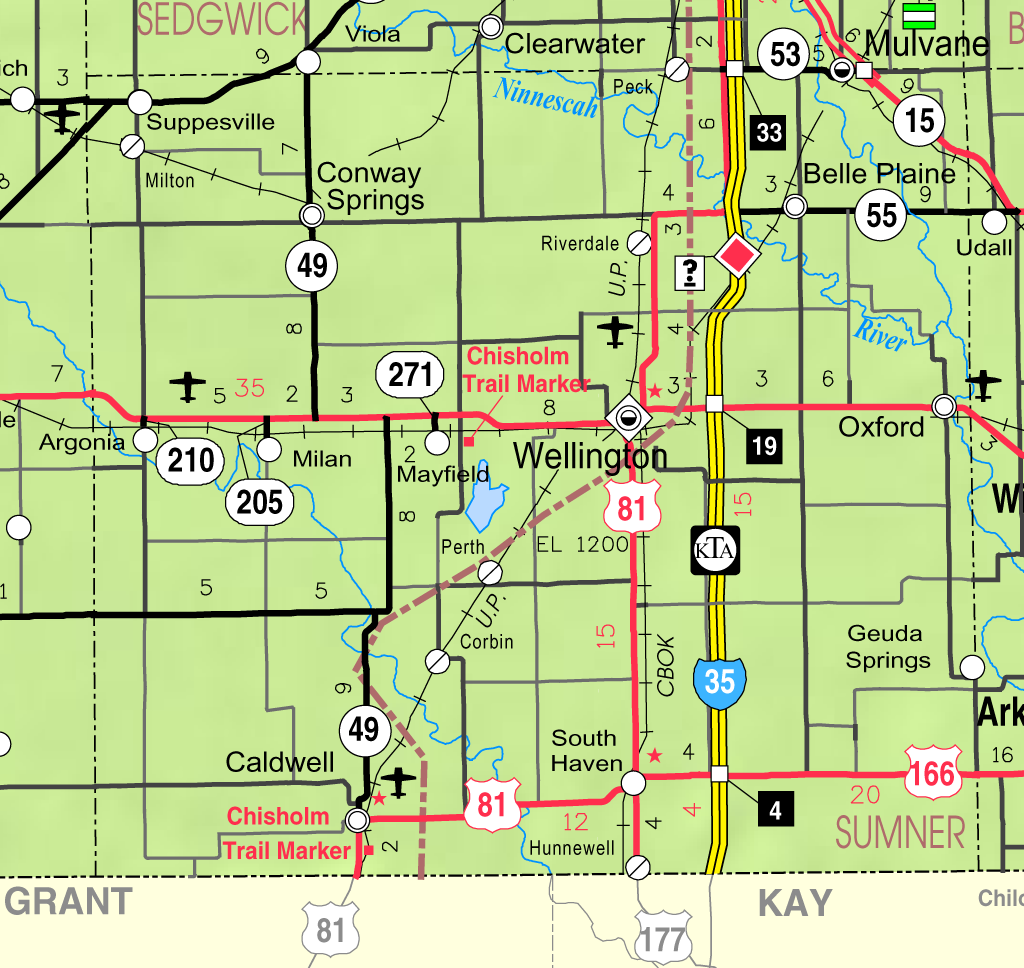
- KDOT map of Sumner County (legend)
- Coordinates: 37°15′47″N 97°32′25″W
- Country: United States
- State: Kansas
- County: Sumner
- Founded: 1880s
- Incorporated: 1927

Area
  - Total: 0.30 sq mi (0.77 km^{2})
  - Land: 0.30 sq mi (0.77 km^{2})
  - Water: 0 sq mi (0.00 km^{2})
- Elevation: 1,283 ft (391 m)

Population (2020)
  - Total: 75
  - Density: 250/sq mi (97/km^{2})
- Time zone: UTC-6 (CST)
  - Summer (DST): UTC-5 (CDT)
- ZIP Code: 67103
- Area code: 620
- FIPS code: 20-45275
- GNIS ID: 2395051

Mayfield is a city in Sumner County, Kansas, United States. As of the 2020 census, the population of the city was 75.

== History ==
The first post office in Mayfield was established in 1880.

== Geography ==
According to the United States Census Bureau, the city has a total area of 0.11 square miles (0.28 km^{2}), all land.

== Demographics ==
Historical population
Census	Pop.	Note	%±
1930	187		—
1940	150		−19.8%
1950	134		−10.7%
1960	119		−11.2%
1970	110		−7.6%
1980	128		16.4%
1990	110		−14.1%
2000	113		2.7%
2010	113		0.0%
2020	75		−33.6%
U.S. Decennial Census

=== 2020 census ===
The 2020 United States census counted 75 people, 30 households, and 19 families in Mayfield. The population density was 253.4 per square mile (97.8/km^{2}). There were 48 housing units at an average density of 162.2 per square mile (62.6/km^{2}). The racial makeup was 88.0% (66) white or European American (88.0% non-Hispanic white), 0.0% (0) black or African-American, 0.0% (0) Native American or Alaska Native, 0.0% (0) Asian, 0.0% (0) Pacific Islander or Native Hawaiian, 0.0% (0) from other races, and 12.0% (9) from two or more races. Hispanic or Latino of any race was 0.0% (0) of the population.

Of the 30 households, 26.7% had children under the age of 18; 53.3% were married couples living together; 23.3% had a female householder with no spouse or partner present. 36.7% of households consisted of individuals and 20.0% had someone living alone who was 65 years of age or older. The average household size was 1.8 and the average family size was 2.6. The percent of those with a bachelor's degree or higher was estimated to be 12.0% of the population.

13.3% of the population was under the age of 18, 13.3% from 18 to 24, 10.7% from 25 to 44, 28.0% from 45 to 64, and 34.7% who were 65 years of age or older. The median age was 53.3 years. For every 100 females, there were 114.3 males. For every 100 females ages 18 and older, there were 109.7 males.

The 2016–2020 5-year American Community Survey estimates show that the median family income was $74,844 (+/- $26,651). Males had a median income of $70,313 (+/- $49,271). The median income for those above 16 years old was $38,750 (+/- $15,561). Approximately, 0.0% of families and 1.6% of the population were below the poverty line, including 0.0% of those under the age of 18 and 3.4% of those ages 65 or over.

=== 2010 census ===
As of the census of 2010, there were 113 people, 45 households, and 34 families residing in the city. The population density was 1,027.3 inhabitants per square mile (396.6/km^{2}). There were 55 housing units at an average density of 500.0 per square mile (193.1/km^{2}). The racial makeup of the city was 99.1% White and 0.9% Asian. Hispanic or Latino of any race were 1.8% of the population.

There were 45 households, of which 31.1% had children under the age of 18 living with them, 64.4% were married couples living together, 8.9% had a female householder with no husband present, 2.2% had a male householder with no wife present, and 24.4% were non-families. 24.4% of all households were made up of individuals, and 13.3% had someone living alone who was 65 years of age or older. The average household size was 2.51 and the average family size was 3.00.

The median age in the city was 42.8 years. 27.4% of residents were under the age of 18; 5.2% were between the ages of 18 and 24; 19.5% were from 25 to 44; 29.1% were from 45 to 64; and 18.6% were 65 years of age or older. The gender makeup of the city was 42.5% male and 57.5% female.

=== 2000 census ===
As of the census of 2000, there were 113 people, 48 households, and 39 families residing in the city. The population density was 1,081.7 inhabitants per square mile (417.6/km^{2}). There were 52 housing units at an average density of 497.8 per square mile (192.2/km^{2}). The racial makeup of the city was 95.58% White, 1.77% Asian, and 2.65% from two or more races. Hispanic or Latino of any race were 1.77% of the population.

There were 48 households, out of which 25.0% had children under the age of 18 living with them, 70.8% were married couples living together, 8.3% had a female householder with no husband present, and 18.8% were non-families. 16.7% of all households were made up of individuals, and 6.3% had someone living alone who was 65 years of age or older. The average household size was 2.35 and the average family size was 2.64.

In the city, the population was spread out, with 20.4% under the age of 18, 3.5% from 18 to 24, 28.3% from 25 to 44, 26.5% from 45 to 64, and 21.2% who were 65 years of age or older. The median age was 44 years. For every 100 females, there were 101.8 males. For every 100 females age 18 and over, there were 87.5 males.

The median income for a household in the city was $40,417, and the median income for a family was $45,625. Males had a median income of $41,250 versus $24,500 for females. The per capita income for the city was $18,399. There were 7.3% of families and 4.1% of the population living below the poverty line, including no under eighteens and none of those over 64.

== Area attractions ==
- Chisholm Trail Marker

== Education ==
The community is served by Wellington USD 353 public school district.
