= Mulvane USD 263 =

Public school district in Mulvane, Kansas

Address
- 628 E. Mulvane St. Mulvane, Kansas, 67110; United States
- Coordinates: 37°28′35″N 97°14′6″W

District information
- Type: Public
- Grades: Pre-K to 12
- Schools: 4
- NCES District ID: 2009840

Students and staff
- Students: 1,807 (2020–21)
- Teachers: 153.3 (FTE)
- Student–teacher ratio: 11.79

Other information
- Website: usd263.com

Mulvane High School

Location
- 1900 North Rock Road; Mulvane, (Sedgwick County), Kansas 67110; United States

Information
- Type: Public high school
- Principal: Jeromy Swearingen
- Staff: 43.40 (FTE)
- Enrollment: 562 (2023-24)
- Student to teacher ratio: 12.95
- Colors: Green and white
- Nickname: Wildcats
- Website: Mulvane High School

Mulvane USD 263 is a public unified school district headquartered in Mulvane, Kansas, United States. The district includes the communities of Mulvane, Peck, and nearby rural areas.

== Schools ==
The school district operates the following schools:

- Mulvane High School
- Mulvane Middle School
- Mulvane Grade School
- Munson Primary School

== See also ==
- List of high schools in Kansas
- List of unified school districts in Kansas
- Kansas State Department of Education
- Kansas State High School Activities Association
