= Cicero, Kansas =

Unincorporated community in Sumner County, Kansas

Coordinates: 37°20′02″N 97°20′26″W

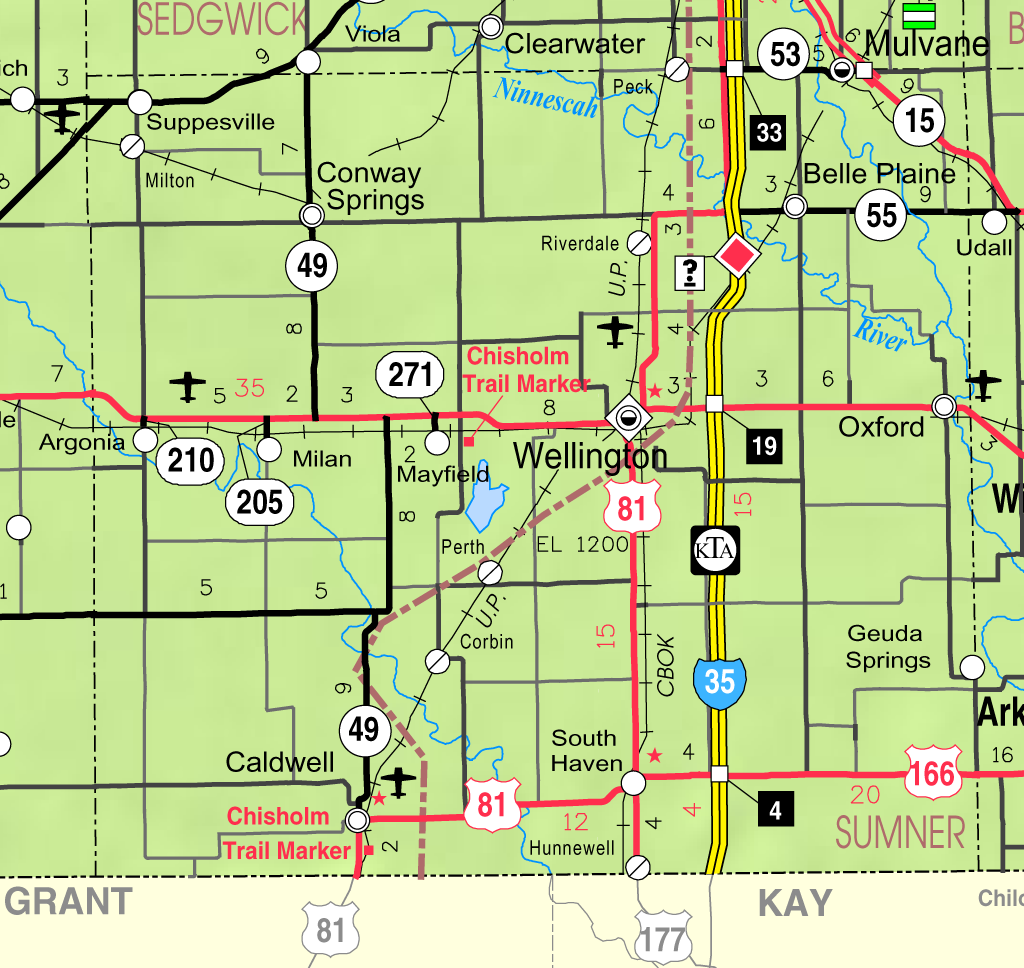
KDOT map of Sumner County (legend)

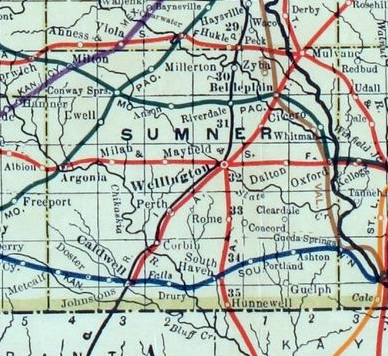
1915 railroad map of Sumner County

Cicero is an unincorporated community in Sumner County, Kansas, United States. It is located approximately four miles northeast of Wellington at about 2.5 miles east of the intersection of U.S. Route 81 and E 50th Ave N, adjacent to the railroad.

== History ==
A post office was opened in Cicero in 1883, and remained in operation until it was discontinued in 1934.

== Education ==
The community is served by Belle Plaine USD 357 public school district.
