= Belle Plaine USD 357 =

Public school district in Belle Plaine, Kansas

Address
- 719 N. Main St. Belle Plaine, Kansas, 67013; United States
- Coordinates: 37°23′48″N 97°16′48″W

District information
- Type: Public
- Grades: K to 12
- Schools: 3

Other information
- Website: usd357.org

Belle Plaine USD 357 is a public unified school district headquartered in Belle Plaine, Kansas, United States. The district includes the communities of Belle Plaine, Cicero, Zyba, and nearby rural areas.

== History ==
Jim Sutton, previously of the Riverside Community School District in Iowa, left his position in 2016 to work at USD 357.

== Schools ==
The school district operates the following schools:

- Belle Plaine High School
- Belle Plaine Middle School
- Belle Plaine Elementary School

== See also ==
- Kansas State Department of Education
- Kansas State High School Activities Association
- List of high schools in Kansas
- List of unified school districts in Kansas
