= Zyba, Kansas =

Unincorporated community in Sumner County, Kansas

- Unincorporated community
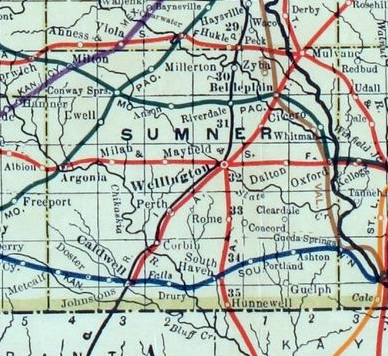
- 1915 railroad map of Sumner County

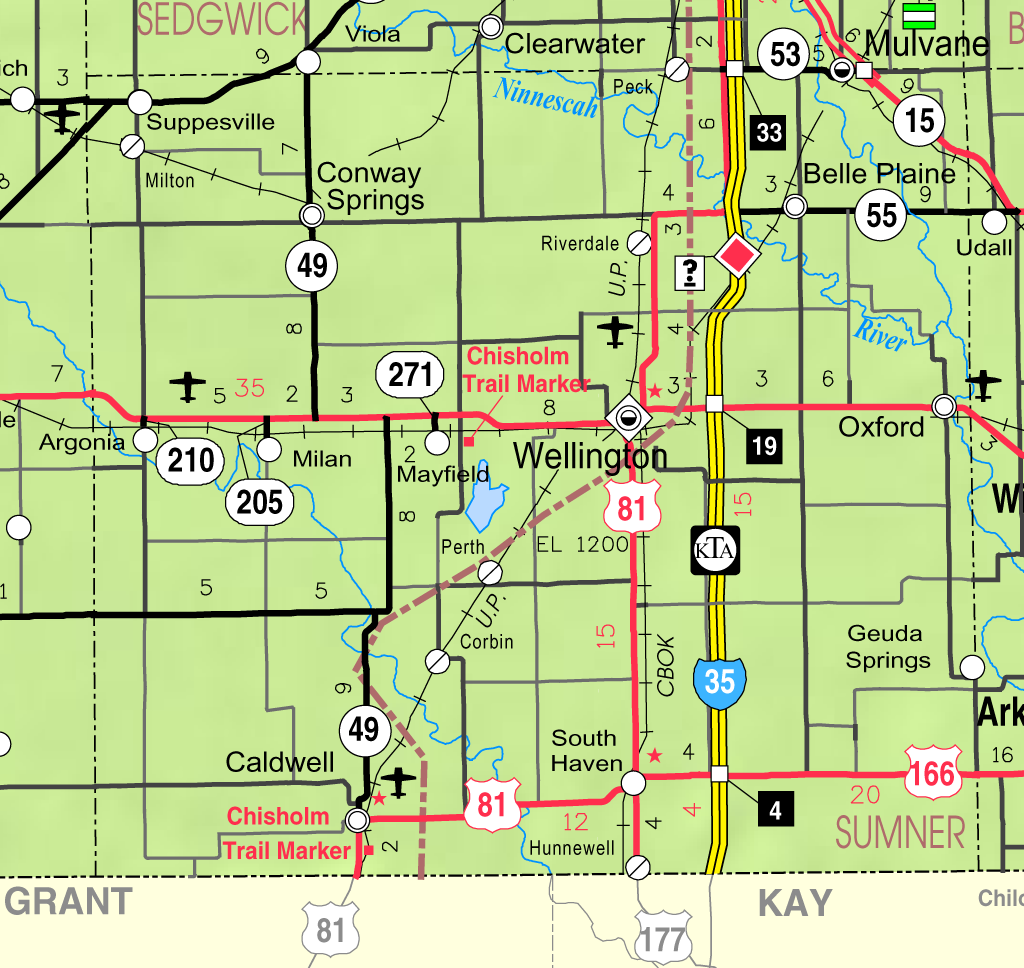
- KDOT map of Sumner County (legend)

- Location within Kansas Location within the United States
- Coordinates: 37°26′05″N 97°23′21″W
- Country: United States
- State: Kansas
- County: Sumner
- Elevation: 1,230 ft (370 m)
- Time zone: UTC-6 (CST)
  - Summer (DST): UTC-5 (CDT)
- Area code: 620
- FIPS code: 20-81050
- GNIS ID: 484508

Zyba is an unincorporated community in Sumner County, Kansas, United States. It is located approximately four miles southwest of the Kansas Star Casino at N West St and E 120th Ave N, next to the railroad and Ninnescah River.

== History ==
A post office was opened in Zyba in 1887, and remained in operation until it was discontinued in 1906.

== Education ==
The community is served by Belle Plaine USD 357 public school district.
