= Avon Township, Sumner County, Kansas =

Township in Sumner County, Kansas, U.S.

Avon Township
- Township
- Location within Sumner County
- Coordinates: 37.253713°N 97.308559°W
- Country: United States
- State: Kansas
- County: Sumner
- Established: 1873

Government
  - Trustee: Jacob Wetta

Area
  - Total: 35.56 sq mi (92.1 km^{2})
  - Land: 35.55 sq mi (92.1 km^{2})
  - Water: 0.01 sq mi (0.026 km^{2}) 0.03%

Population (2020)
  - Total: 274
  - Density: 7.71/sq mi (2.98/km^{2})
- Time zone: UTC-6 (CST)
  - Summer (DST): UTC-5 (CDT)
- Area code: 620
- GNIS feature ID: 470329

Avon Township is a township in Sumner County, Kansas, United States. As of the 2020 census, its population was 274.

== History ==
Avon Township was established in 1873. In 1879, Greene Township was created from part of it.

== Geography ==
Avon Township covers an area of 35.56 square miles (92.1 square kilometers). Antelope Creek, Slate Creek, Deer Creek, and Synder Creek flow through it. An exclave of the city of Wellington is completely surrounded by the township.

=== Communities ===
- Dalton

=== Adjacent townships ===
Harmon Township, Sumner County
Seventy-Six Township, Sumner County	northwest	north	northeast	Palestine Township, Sumner County
Wellington Township, Sumner County	west	self	east	Oxford Township, Sumner County
Jackson Township, Sumner County	southwest	south	southeast	Valverde Township, Sumner County
Greene Township, Sumner County

== Transportation ==
=== Major highways ===
- I-35 / Kansas Turnpike
- US-160

== Demographics ==
As of the 2020 census, there were 274 people and 151 households residing in the township. The population density was 7.71 people per square mile (2.98 people/km^{2}). There were 156 housing units. The racial makeup of the township was 90.9% White, 0.7% from some other race, and 8.4% from two or more races. Hispanics or Latinos of any race were 1.5% of the population.

There were 151 households: 86.1% were married couples living together and 12.6% had a female householder with no spouse present. The average family size was 3.35 people. 38.2% of people in the township older than 24 had a college degree, and the township had an employment rate of 59.8%.
