= Millerton, Kansas =

Unincorporated community in Sumner County, Kansas

- Unincorporated community
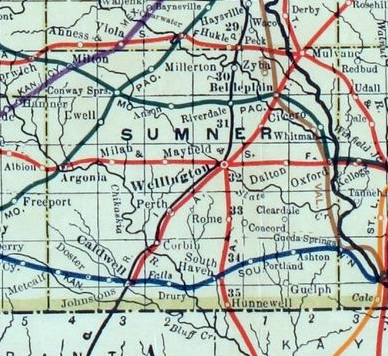
- 1915 railroad map of Sumner County

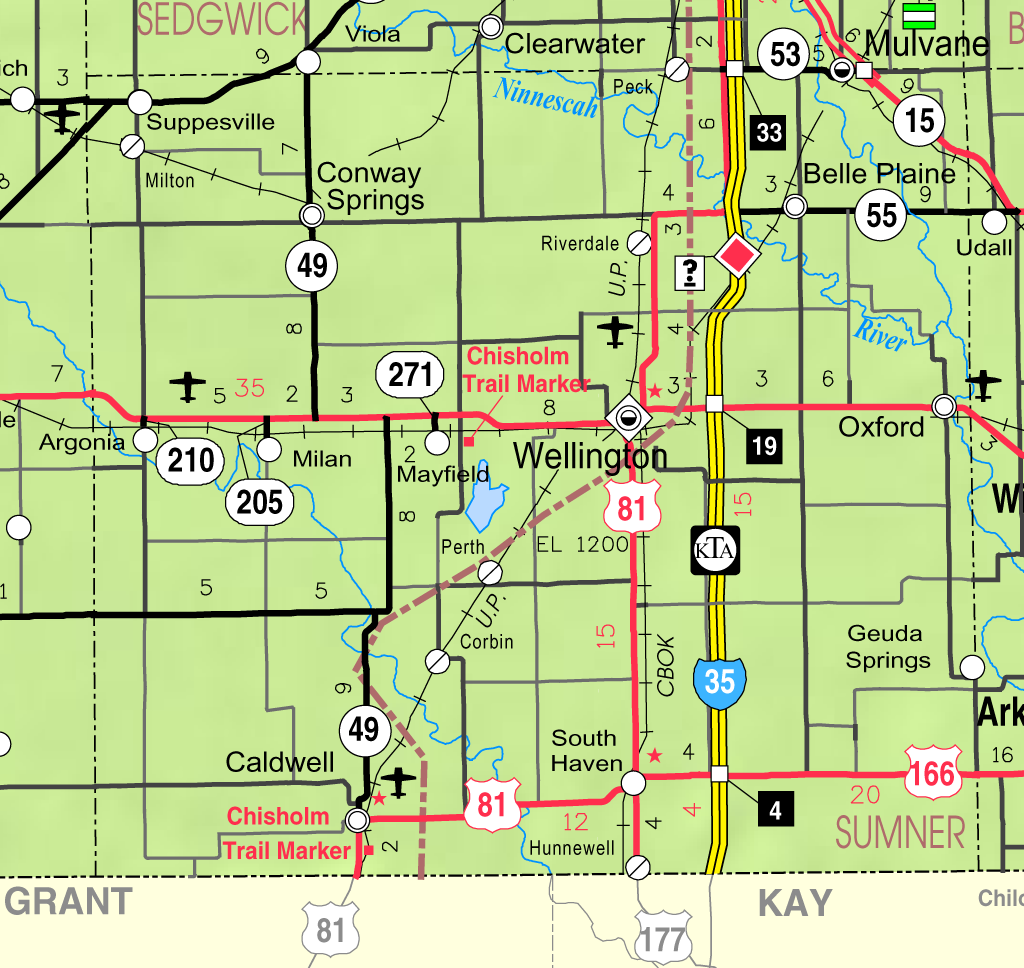
- KDOT map of Sumner County (legend)

- Location within Kansas Location within the United States
- Coordinates: 37°26′12″N 97°33′23″W
- Country: United States
- State: Kansas
- County: Sumner
- Elevation: 1,345 ft (410 m)
- Time zone: UTC-6 (CST)
  - Summer (DST): UTC-5 (CDT)
- Area code: 620
- FIPS code: 20-46800
- GNIS ID: 484509

Millerton is an unincorporated community in Sumner County, Kansas, United States. It is located approximately five miles northeast of Conway Springs at the intersection of N Maple Rd and W 123rd Ave N, adjacent to the railroad.

== History ==
Millerton had a post office from 1875 until 1912, but the post office there was called Rolling Green until 1884.

== Education ==
The community is served by Clearwater USD 264 public school district.
