= Springdale Township, Kansas =

Township in Sumner County, Kansas, U.S.

Springdale Township
- Township
- Location within Sumner County
- Coordinates: 37.343817°N 97.639184°W
- Country: United States
- State: Kansas
- County: Sumner
- Established: 1878

Government
  - Trustee: Chris Vancuren

Area
  - Total: 35.806 sq mi (92.74 km^{2})
  - Land: 35.806 sq mi (92.74 km^{2})
  - Water: 0 sq mi (0 km^{2}) 0%

Population (2020)
  - Total: 669
  - Density: 18.7/sq mi (7.21/km^{2})
- Time zone: UTC-6 (CST)
  - Summer (DST): UTC-5 (CDT)
- Area code: 620
- GNIS feature ID: 470264

Springdale Township is a township in Sumner County, Kansas, United States. As of the 2020 census, its population was 669.

== History ==
Springdale Township was established in 1878 from part of Sumner Township.

== Geography ==
Springdale Township covers an area of 35.806 square miles (92.74 km^{2}), all of it land. Slate Creek flows through it.

=== Communities ===
- part of Conway Springs

=== Adjacent townships ===
Conway Township, Sumner County
		north	northeast	Illinois Township, Sumner County
Creek Township, Sumner County	west	self	east	Sumner Township, Sumner County
Dixon Township, Sumner County	southwest	south	southeast	Osborne Township, Sumner County
Ryan Township, Sumner County

== Transportation ==
=== Major highways ===
- K-49

== Demographics ==
As of the 2020 census, the township had a population of 669, giving a population density of 33.06 people per square mile (12.76 people/km^{2}). The racial makeup of the township was 95.8% White, 0.6% from some other race, and 3.6% from two or more races. Hispanics or Latinos of any race were 1.3% of the population.

The 2020–2024 American Community Survey estimated that the township contained 319 households and 346 housing units.
