= Riverdale, Kansas =

Unincorporated community in Sumner County, Kansas

- Unincorporated community
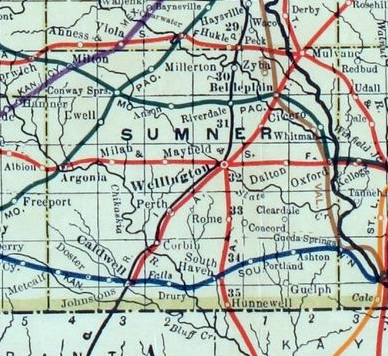
- 1915 railroad map of Sumner County

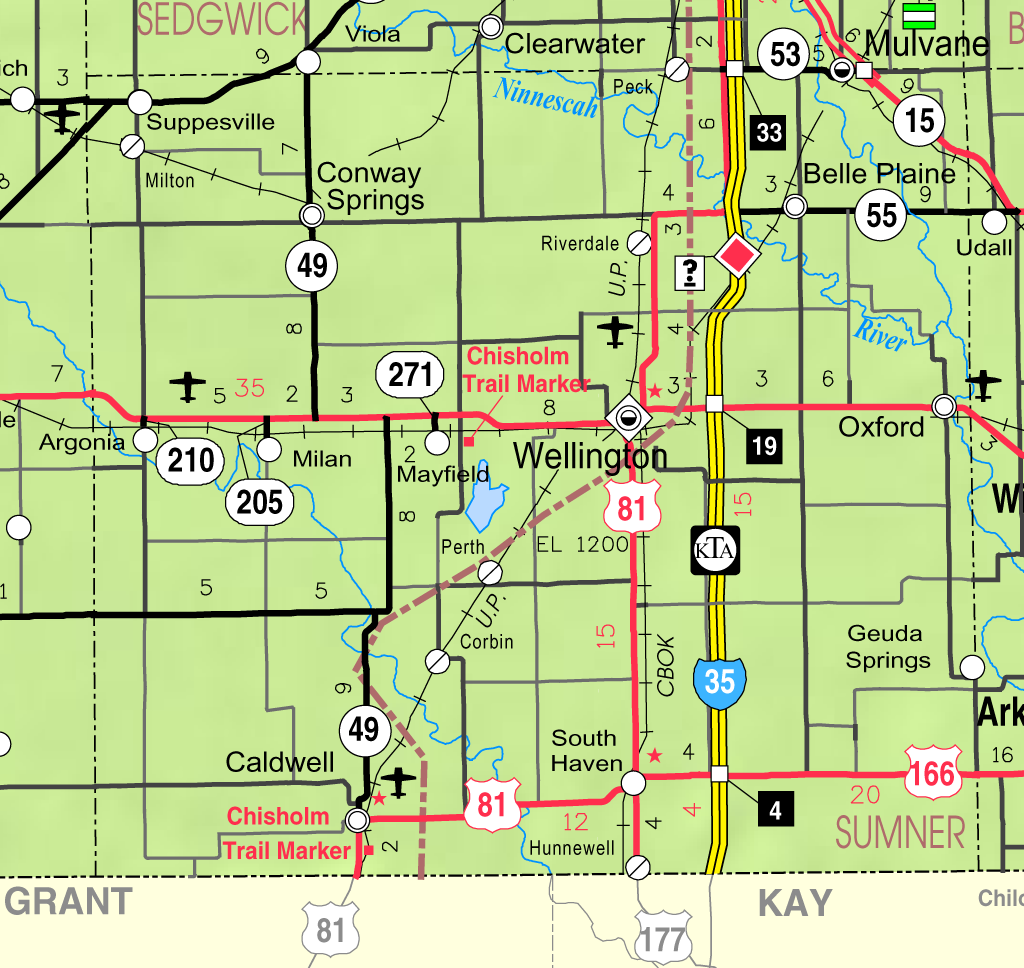
- KDOT map of Sumner County (legend)

- Location within Kansas Location within the United States
- Coordinates: 37°22′20″N 97°23′25″W
- Country: United States
- State: Kansas
- County: Sumner
- Elevation: 1,309 ft (399 m)
- Time zone: UTC-6 (CST)
  - Summer (DST): UTC-5 (CDT)
- Area code: 620
- FIPS code: 20-60075
- GNIS ID: 470163

Riverdale is an unincorporated community in Sumner County, Kansas, United States. It is located approximately six miles southwest of Belle Plaine at the intersection of N Sand Plum Rd and 77th Ave N, or west of U.S. Route 81, adjacent to the railroad.

== History ==
A post office was opened in Riverdale in 1887, and remained in operation until it was discontinued in 1973.

A railroad currently passes through the community, north to south, from Wichita to Wellington. Previously a railroad passed through the community, east to west, from Belle Plaine to Conway Springs.

== Education ==
The community is served by Wellington USD 353 public school district.

== Transportation ==
The Chicago, Rock Island and Pacific Railroad formerly provided passenger rail service to Riverdale on their mainline from Minneapolis to Houston until at least 1951. As of 2025, the nearest passenger rail station is located in Newton, where Amtrak's Southwest Chief stops once daily on a route from Chicago to Los Angeles.
