= Sumner Township, Sumner County, Kansas =

Township in Sumner County, Kansas, U.S.

Sumner Township
- Township
- Location within Sumner County
- Coordinates: 37.344701°N 97.530474°W
- Country: United States
- State: Kansas
- County: Sumner
- Established: 1871

Government
  - Trustee: Rodney Chitwood

Area
  - Total: 36.178 sq mi (93.70 km^{2})
  - Land: 36.178 sq mi (93.70 km^{2})
  - Water: 0 sq mi (0 km^{2}) 0%

Population (2020)
  - Total: 132
  - Density: 3.65/sq mi (1.41/km^{2})
- Time zone: UTC-6 (CST)
  - Summer (DST): UTC-5 (CDT)
- Area code: 620
- GNIS feature ID: 470165

Sumner Township is a township in Sumner County, Kansas, United States. As of the 2020 census, its population was 132.

== History ==
Sumner Township was established in 1871. Sumner Township was the first township in the county settled, which would happen by John Degolia and A. Cadou in 1869. In 1878, Springdale Township was created from part of Sumner Township. The township was home to the now-extinct town of Swedona, which was called Belinda before June 5, 1877. Swedona's post office was open from 1877 to 1885.

== Geography ==
Sumner Township covers an area of 36.178 square miles (93.70 km^{2}), all of it land. Slate Creek flows through it.

=== Communities ===
- Anson

=== Adjacent townships ===
Illinois Township, Sumner County
		north	northeast	London Township, Sumner County
Springdale Township, Sumner County	west	self	east	Seventy-Six Township, Sumner County
Ryan Township, Sumner County	southwest	south	southeast	Wellington Township, Sumner County
Osborne Township, Sumner County

== Demographics ==
As of the 2020 census, the township had a population of 132, giving a population density of 3.65 people per square mile (1.41 people/km^{2}).

The 2020–2024 American Community Survey estimated that the township contained 56 housing units.
