= Chikaskia River =

River in Kansas and Oklahoma, U.S.

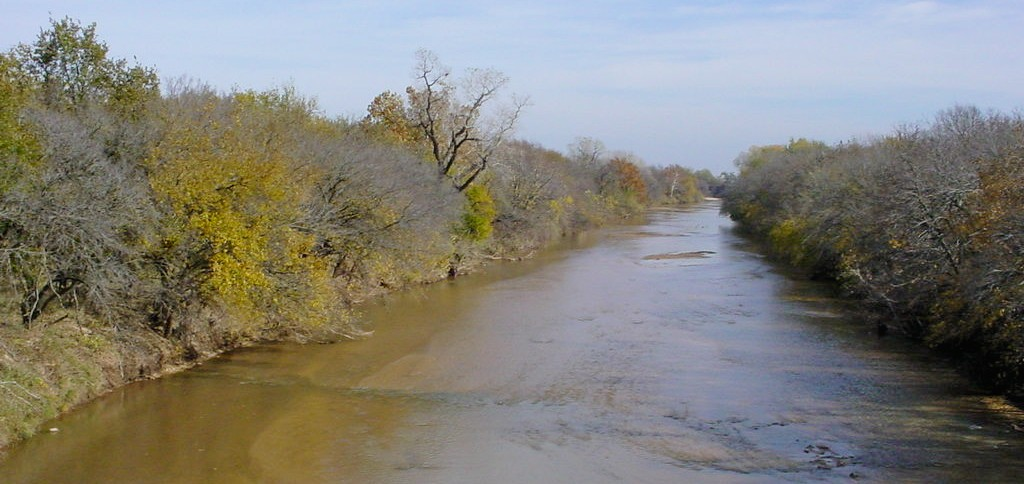
- The Chikaskia River near the community of Corbin in Sumner County, Kansas

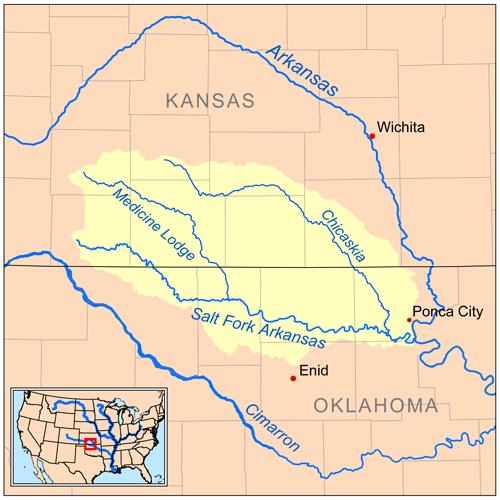
- Map of the Salt Fork Arkansas watershed showing the Chikaskia River

Location
- Country: United States
- State: Kansas, Oklahoma
- Region: Great Plains

Physical characteristics
- Source
  - location: Southwest Pratt County, Great Plains, Kansas, United States
  - coordinates: 37°31′00″N 098°34′43″W
  - elevation: 925 ft (282 m)
- Mouth: Salt Fork of the Arkansas River
  - location: Near Tonkawa, Oklahoma, United States
  - coordinates: 36°37′23″N 097°14′38″W
  - elevation: 282 ft (86 m)
- Length: 159 mi (256 km), Southeast
- Discharge
  - location: near Blackwell
  - average: 621.8 cu ft/s (17.61 m^{3}/s), USGS water years 1936-2019

Basin features
- River system: Salt Fork of the Arkansas River watershed

The Chikaskia River (usually pronounced chi-KAS-kee-uh but often pronounced chi-KAS-kee in southern Kansas) is a 159-mile-long (256 km) tributary of the Salt Fork of the Arkansas River in southern Kansas and northern Oklahoma in the United States. Via the Salt Fork and Arkansas rivers, it is part of the watershed of the Mississippi River.

== Course ==
The Chikaskia River begins as an intermittent stream in southwestern Pratt County, Kansas and initially flows eastwardly into Kingman County, where it turns southeastward for the remainder of its course through Harper and Sumner counties in Kansas and Grant and Kay counties in Oklahoma. In Kay County the river flows past the town of Blackwell and flows into the Salt Fork 5 miles (8 km) southeast of Tonkawa.

== Variant names ==
The United States Board on Geographic Names settled on "Chikaskia River" as the river's official name and spelling in 1897. According to the Geographic Names Information System, the river has also been known as "Chicaskia River", "Sha wa cas kah River", and "Sha-wa-cas-kah River."

Bluff Creek, one of its major tributaries, rises from several saline branches in Harper County, Kansas near Attica and Harper, passes near Bluff City, leaving Kansas in Sumner County and enters Oklahoma in Grant County. After meandering back into Sumner County twice, it returns to Oklahoma and ends at its mouth on the Chikaskia in northwestern Kay County, Oklahoma. In the 1870s, maps showed stretches of Bluff Creek as the Shawacospah.

== Fishing ==
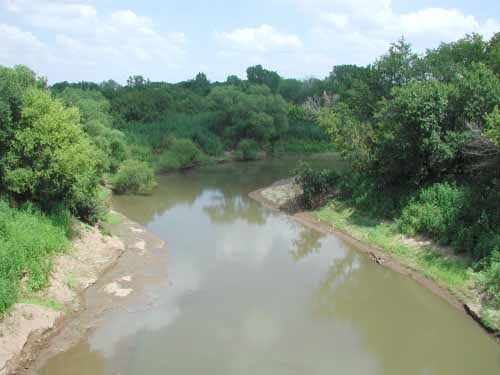
The Chikaskia River at Blackwell, Oklahoma

The Chikaskia River and the Salt Fork are known for their large catfish.

== See also ==
- List of Kansas rivers
- List of Oklahoma rivers
- USS Chikaskia (AO-54) is named after the river
