= Chikaskia Township, Sumner County, Kansas =

Township in Sumner County, Kansas, U.S.

Chikaskia Township
- Township
- Location within Sumner County
- Coordinates: 37.164371°N 97.632032°W
- Country: United States
- State: Kansas
- County: Sumner
- Established: 1871

Government
  - Trustee: Mark Kendrick

Area
  - Total: 36.18 sq mi (93.7 km^{2})
  - Land: 36.171 sq mi (93.68 km^{2})
  - Water: 0.009 sq mi (0.023 km^{2}) 0.02%

Population (2020)
  - Total: 47
  - Density: 1.3/sq mi (0.50/km^{2})
- Time zone: UTC-6 (CST)
  - Summer (DST): UTC-5 (CDT)
- Area code: 620
- GNIS feature ID: 470314

Chikaskia Township is a township in Sumner County, Kansas, United States. As of the 2020 census, its population was 47.

== History ==
Chikaskia Township was established in 1871. In 1877, Dixon Township and part of Osborne Township were created from parts of Chikaskia Township. In 1879, part of Downs Township and Morris Township were created from parts of Chikaskia Township.

== Geography ==
Chikaskia Township covers an area of 36.18 square miles (93.7 square kilometers). The Chikaskia River flows through it, as well as Beaver Creek.

=== Adjacent townships ===
Ryan Township, Sumner County
Dixon Township, Sumner County	northwest	north	northeast	Osborne Township, Sumner County
Morris Township, Sumner County	west	self	east	Downs Township, Sumner County
Bluff Township, Sumner County	southwest	south	southeast	Falls Township, Sumner County
Caldwell Township, Sumner County

== Transportation ==
=== Major highways ===
- K-44
- K-49

== Demographics ==
As of the 2020 census, there were 47 people and 28 households residing in the township. The population density was 1.3 people per square mile (0.50 people/km^{2}). There were 28 housing units. The racial makeup of the township was 89.4% White and 10.6% from two or more races. Hispanics or Latinos of any race were 2.1% of the population.

There were 28 households: 35.7% were married couples living together, 28.6% had a male householder with no spouse present, and 35.7% had a female householder with no spouse present. The average family size was 3.40 people. 29.4% of people in the township older than 24 had a college degree, and the township had an employment rate of 80.8%.
