= Corbin, Kansas =

Unincorporated community in Sumner County, Kansas

- Unincorporated community
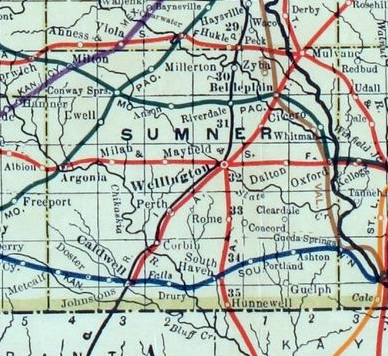
- 1915 railroad map of Sumner County

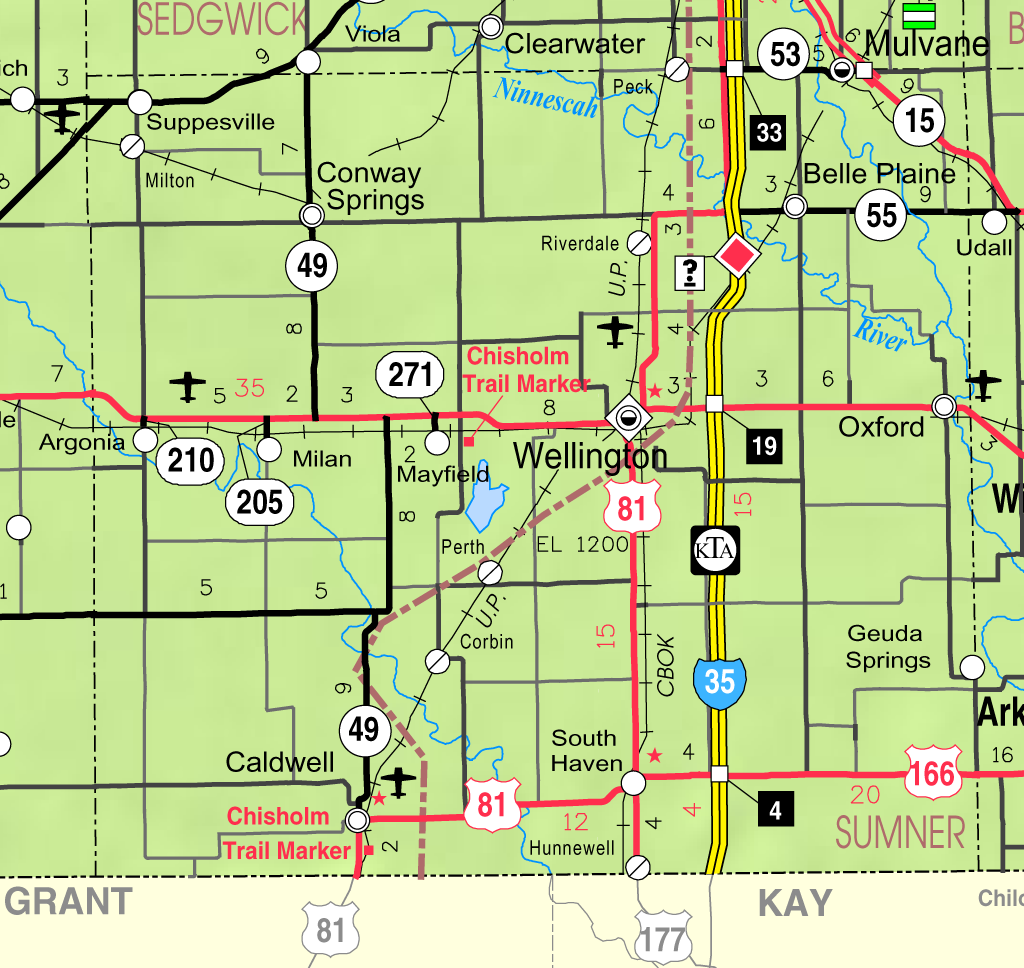
- KDOT map of Sumner County (legend)

- Location within Kansas Location within the United States
- Coordinates: 37°7′35″N 97°32′38″W
- Country: United States
- State: Kansas
- County: Sumner
- Elevation: 1,158 ft (353 m)
- Time zone: UTC-6 (CST)
  - Summer (DST): UTC-5 (CDT)
- Area code: 620
- FIPS code: 20-15575
- GNIS ID: 470307

Corbin is an unincorporated community in Sumner County, Kansas, United States. It is located about 6.5 miles northeast of Caldwell near the intersection of S Mayfield Rd and W 110th St S, next to the railroad.

== History ==
In 1887, the Chicago, Kansas and Nebraska Railway built a branch line north–south from Herington through Corbin to Caldwell. It foreclosed in 1891 and was taken over by Chicago, Rock Island and Pacific Railway, which shut down in 1980 and reorganized as Oklahoma, Kansas and Texas Railroad, merged in 1988 with Missouri Pacific Railroad, merged in 1997 with Union Pacific Railroad. Most locals still refer to this railroad as the "Rock Island".

The post office was established February 6, 1884, and discontinued February 16, 1975. The nearby Spring Creek School is on the National Register of Historic Places.

== Education ==
The community is served by Caldwell USD 360 public school district.

== Transportation ==
The Chicago, Rock Island and Pacific Railroad formerly provided passenger rail service to Corbin on their mainline from Minneapolis to Houston until at least 1951. As of 2025, the nearest passenger rail station is located in Newton, where Amtrak's Southwest Chief stops once daily on a route from Chicago to Los Angeles.
