= K-49 (Kansas highway) =

State highway in Kansas, U.S.

K-49
- K-49 highlighted in red

Route information
- Maintained by KDOT
- Length: 35.354 mi (56.897 km)
- Existed: 1927–present

Major junctions
- South end: US-81 in Caldwell
- US-160 south of Conway Springs
- North end: K-42 in Viola

Location
- Country: United States
- State: Kansas
- Counties: Sedgwick, Sumner

Highway system
- Kansas State Highway System; Interstate; US; State; Spurs
← K-48	→ US-50

K-49 is a 35.354-mile-long (56.897 km) north–south state highway in the U.S. state of Kansas. K-49 begins at U.S. Route 81 (US-81) in Caldwell, and runs north to K-42 in Viola. Along the way, K-49 has a brief overlap with US-160 south of Conway Springs. The majority of the route exists in Sumner County, with only a mile existing in Sedgwick County.

Before state highways were numbered in Kansas, there were auto trails. The southern terminus was part of the former South West Trail and Meridian Highway. K-49 was first designated as a state highway by the Kansas State Highway Commission, now known as the Kansas Department of Transportation, in 1927. At that time it ran from US-81 in Caldwell north to K-42 in Conway Springs. Then, by 1928, K-42 was realigned to a new alignment and at that time K-49 was extended north to Viola.

== Route description ==
K-49's southern terminus is in downtown Caldwell at an intersection with US-81 and West Central Avenue. The highway begins traveling north as Main Street and soon exits the city. The highway shifts east slightly with an S-shaped curve, as it passes through flat farmland. It crosses the Chikaskia River west of Corbin, and shifts northeast to avoid a second crossing with the river before intersecting the eastern terminus of K-44 in a slightly wooded area. K-49 shifts east once again with a gentle S-shaped curve. The roadway continues north through flat fields, where it intersects the Chisholm Trail. The highway continues north to an at-grade crossing with a BNSF Railway track, and then reaches an intersection with US-160.

K-49 overlaps the U.S. highway westward, crosses Beaver Creek, then resumes its northerly course as US-160 continues west. The highway continues through more flat fields before shifting west slightly and entering Conway Springs. K-49 continues through the city as 5th Street, then exits just south of an at-grade crossing with a Kansas and Oklahoma Railroad track. The highway continues north, crossing Slate Creek, before entering into Sedgwick County. K-49 soon enters Viola as Grice Street. The highway exits the city and reaches its northern terminus at K-42 southwest of Wichita.

The Kansas Department of Transportation (KDOT) tracks the traffic levels on its highways. On K-49 in 2020, they determined that on average the traffic varied from 705 vehicles per day near just south of K-44 to 2,600 vehicles per day north of Conway Springs.

== History ==
Prior to the formation of the Kansas state highway system, there were auto trails, which were an informal network of marked routes that existed in the United States and Canada in the early part of the 20th century. K-49's southern terminus was part of the former South West Trail and Meridian Highway.

K-49 was first designated as a state highway in 1927. At that time it ran from US-81 in Caldwell north to K-42 in Conway Springs. By 1928, K-42 was realigned to turn north, north of Milton, then continue through Viola to just west of Clearwater. From there, K-42 zig-zagged northeastward to Wichita. At this time K-49 was extended north to Viola, to meet the new alignment of K-42. By 1929, K-49 was truncated to the current eastern terminus of K-44 and K-44 was extended south to Caldwell.

By 1931, K-44 was truncated back to its original eastern terminus and K-49 was extended back to Caldwell. The entire length was gravelled by 1931. In early March 1948, the SHC accepted a bid for a project to pave the entire length of K-49. In a resolution approved on December 10, 1957, the overlap with US-160 was moved north one mile (1.6 km) to a new alignment. The new alignment was completed by 1960.

== Major junctions ==
County	Location	mi	km	Destinations	Notes
Sumner	Caldwell	0.000	0.000	US-81 – Enid Oklahoma, South Haven	Southern terminus; highway continues as US-81 south (Main Street south)
Sumner	Chikaskia Township	8.914	14.346	K-44 west – Anthony	Eastern terminus of K-44
Sumner	Ryan–Osborn township line	17.318	27.871	US-160 east – Wellington	Southern end of US-160 concurrency
Sumner	Ryan Township	20.251	32.591	US-160 west – Medicine Lodge, Argonia	Northern end of US-160 concurrency
Sedgwick	Viola	35.354	56.897	K-42 – Norwich, Wichita	Northern terminus; former K-2; road continues north as 263rd Street West
1.000 mi = 1.609 km; 1.000 km = 0.621 mi: Concurrency terminus
