= Township 5, Harper County, Kansas =

Township 5
- Township
- Location in Harper County
- Coordinates: 37°16′10″N 098°03′31″W
- Country: United States
- State: Kansas
- County: Harper

Area
  - Total: 107.04 sq mi (277.22 km^{2})
  - Land: 106.87 sq mi (276.79 km^{2})
  - Water: 0.17 sq mi (0.43 km^{2}) 0.16%
- Elevation: 1,424 ft (434 m)

Population (2020)
  - Total: 406
  - Density: 3.80/sq mi (1.47/km^{2})
- GNIS feature ID: 0470503

Township 5 is a township in Harper County, Kansas, United States. As of the 2020 census, its population was 406.

== History ==
The township was officially designated "Township Number 5" until late 2007, when "Number" was dropped.

== Geography ==
Township 5 covers an area of 107.04 square miles (277.2 km^{2}) and contains Danville.
