= Township 4, Harper County, Kansas =

Township 4
- Township
- Location in Harper County
- Coordinates: 37°10′03″N 097°50′29″W
- Country: United States
- State: Kansas
- County: Harper

Area
  - Total: 114.75 sq mi (297.21 km^{2})
  - Land: 114.68 sq mi (297.03 km^{2})
  - Water: 0.073 sq mi (0.19 km^{2}) 0.06%
- Elevation: 1,299 ft (396 m)

Population (2020)
  - Total: 178
  - Density: 1.55/sq mi (0.599/km^{2})
- GNIS feature ID: 0470104

Township 4 is a township in Harper County, Kansas, United States. As of the 2020 census, its population was 178.

== History ==
The township was officially designated "Township Number 4" until late 2007, when "Number" was dropped.

== Geography ==
Township 4 covers an area of 114.75 square miles (297.2 km^{2}) and contains Bluff City and Freeport.
