= Peck, Kansas =

Unincorporated community in Sedgwick and Sumner Counties of Kansas

- Unincorporated community and CDP
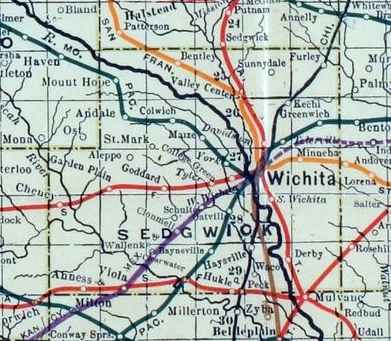
- 1915 railroad map of Sedgwick County

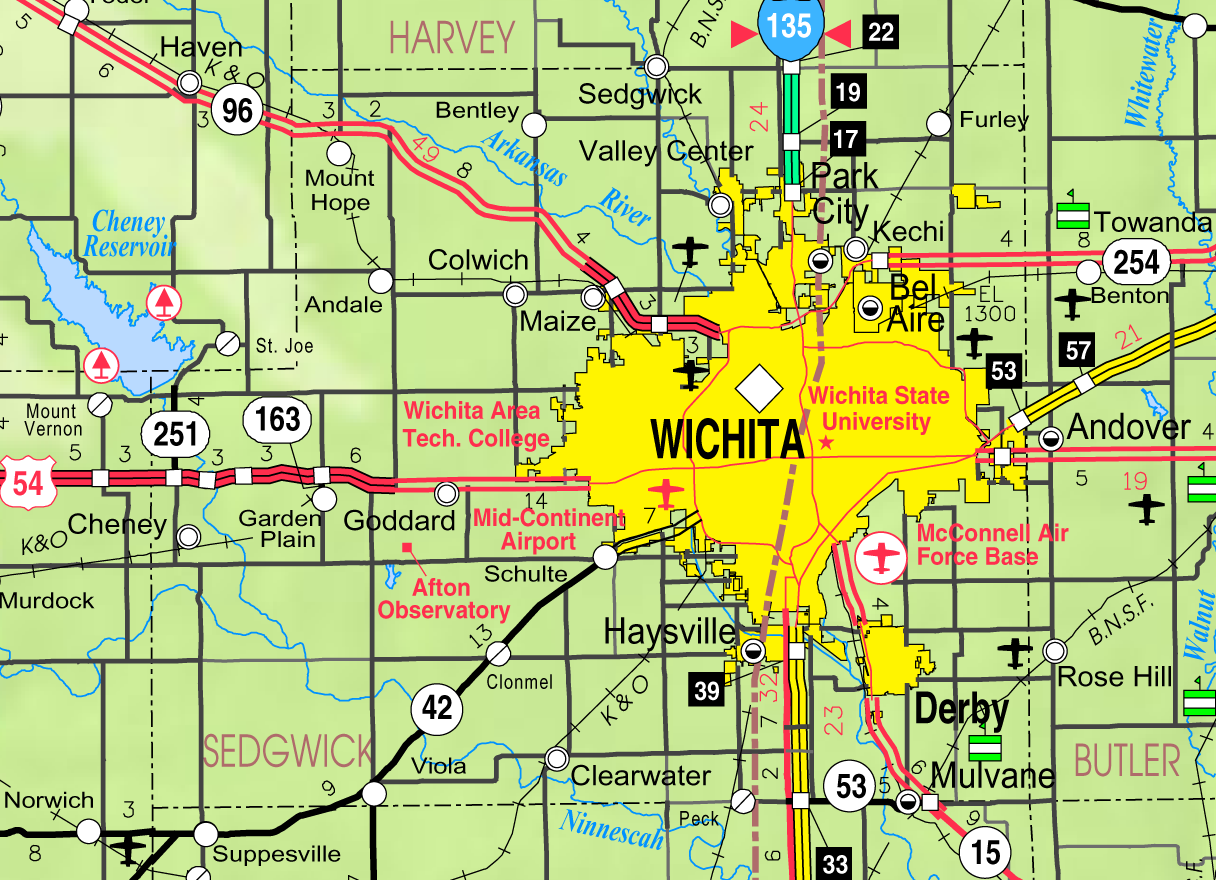
- KDOT map of Sedgwick County (legend)

- Location within Kansas Location within the United States
- Coordinates: 37°28′39″N 97°22′20″W
- Country: United States
- State: Kansas
- County: Sedgwick
- Elevation: 1,260 ft (380 m)

Population (2020)
  - Total: 162
- Time zone: UTC-6 (CST)
  - Summer (DST): UTC-5 (CDT)
- ZIP Code: 67120
- Area code: 316
- FIPS code: 20-55175
- GNIS ID: 470233

Peck is an unincorporated community and census-designated place (CDP) in Sedgwick and Sumner counties in the U.S. state of Kansas. As of the 2020 census, the population was 162. It is located about 2 miles west of the Kansas Star Casino at Meridian Ave and 119th St S, next to the Union Pacific Railroad.

== History ==
=== 19th century ===
In 1887, the Chicago, Kansas and Nebraska Railway built a branch line north–south from Herington through Peck to Caldwell. It foreclosed in 1891 and was taken over by Chicago, Rock Island and Pacific Railway, which shut down in 1980 and reorganized as Oklahoma, Kansas and Texas Railroad, merged in 1988 with Missouri Pacific Railroad, merged in 1997 with Union Pacific Railroad. Most locals still refer to this railroad as the "Rock Island".

The first post office in Peck was established in October 1887. The town was named for George Peck, who owned a hotel there.

== Geography ==
=== Climate ===
The climate in this area is characterized by hot, humid summers and generally mild to cool winters. According to the Köppen Climate Classification system, Peck has a humid subtropical climate, abbreviated "Cfa" on climate maps.

== Demographics ==
Historical population
| Census | Pop. | Note | %± |
|---|---|---|---|
| 2020 | 162 | | — |
U.S. Decennial Census

=== 2020 census ===
The 2020 United States census counted 162 people, 66 households, and 52 families in Peck. The population density was 457.6 per square mile (176.7/km^{2}). There were 68 housing units at an average density of 192.1 per square mile (74.2/km^{2}). The racial makeup was 79.63% (129) white or European American (75.93% non-Hispanic white), 1.23% (2) black or African-American, 4.32% (7) Native American or Alaska Native, 0.0% (0) Asian, 0.0% (0) Pacific Islander or Native Hawaiian, 0.62% (1) from other races, and 14.2% (23) from two or more races. Hispanic or Latino of any race was 10.49% (17) of the population.

Of the 66 households, 36.4% had children under the age of 18; 63.6% were married couples living together; 6.1% had a female householder with no spouse or partner present. 13.6% of households consisted of individuals and 6.1% had someone living alone who was 65 years of age or older. The average household size was 2.3 and the average family size was 4.9. The percent of those with a bachelor's degree or higher was estimated to be 9.9% of the population.

22.2% of the population was under the age of 18, 5.6% from 18 to 24, 29.0% from 25 to 44, 31.5% from 45 to 64, and 11.7% who were 65 years of age or older. The median age was 42.0 years. For every 100 females, there were 74.2 males. For every 100 females ages 18 and older, there were 63.6 males.

== Education ==
The community is served by Mulvane USD 263 public school district.

== Community Center ==
Community events such as car shows and dinners are typically hosted at The Peck Community Center; a former school building of USD 263.

== Transportation ==
The Chicago, Rock Island and Pacific Railroad formerly provided passenger rail service to Peck on their mainline from Minneapolis to Houston until at least 1951. As of 2025, the nearest passenger rail station is located in Newton, where Amtrak's Southwest Chief stops once daily on a route from Chicago to Los Angeles.
