= Sumner County, Kansas =

County in Kansas, United States

- County
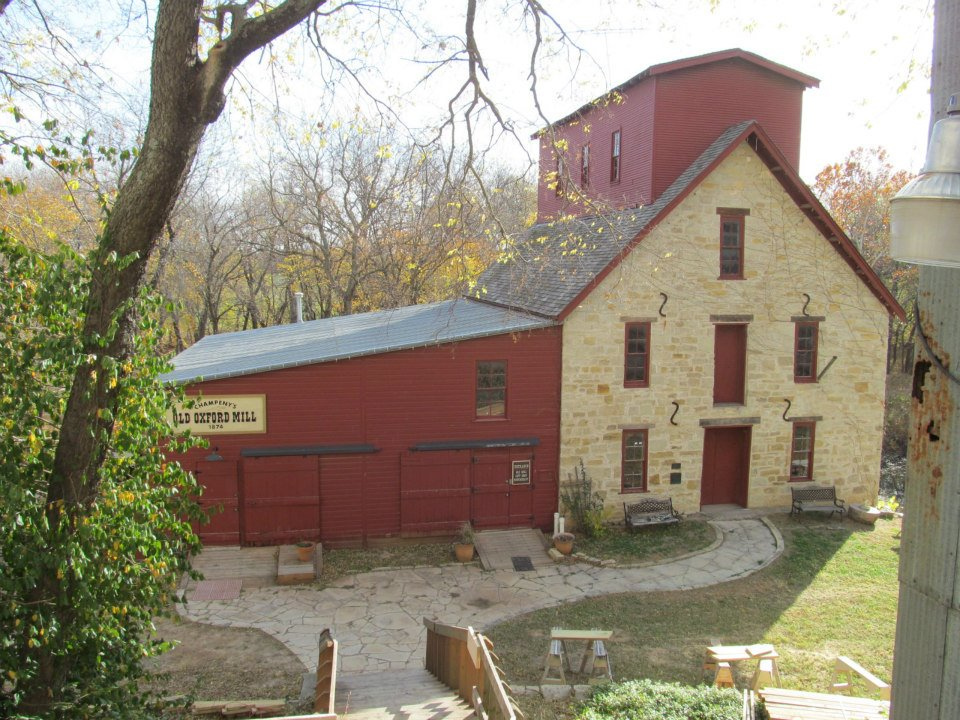
- Old Oxford Mill in Oxford (2012)

- Location within the U.S. state of Kansas
- Coordinates: 37°14′N 97°29′W
- Country: United States
- State: Kansas
- Founded: December 20, 1870
- Named for: Charles Sumner
- Seat: Wellington
- Largest city: Wellington

Area
  - Total: 1,185 sq mi (3,070 km^{2})
  - Land: 1,182 sq mi (3,060 km^{2})
  - Water: 3.0 sq mi (7.8 km^{2}) 0.3%

Population (2020)
  - Total: 22,382
  - Estimate (2025): 22,312 ▼
  - Density: 18.94/sq mi (7.311/km^{2})
- Time zone: UTC−6 (Central)
  - Summer (DST): UTC−5 (CDT)
- Area code: 620
- Congressional district: 4th
- Website: County website

Sumner County is a county located in the U.S. state of Kansas. Its county seat is Wellington. As of the 2020 census, the population was 22,382. The county is named after Charles Sumner, a U.S. senator from Massachusetts who was a leader of Reconstruction politics.

== History ==
=== Early history ===
For many millennia, the Great Plains of North America was inhabited by nomadic Native Americans. From the 16th century to 18th century, the Kingdom of France claimed ownership of large parts of North America. In 1762, after the French and Indian War, France secretly ceded New France to Spain, per the Treaty of Fontainebleau. In 1802, Spain returned most of the land to France, but keeping title to about 7,500 square miles.

In 1803, most of the land for modern day Kansas was acquired by the United States from France as part of the 828,000 square mile Louisiana Purchase for 2.83 cents per acre. In 1848, after the Mexican–American War, the Treaty of Guadalupe Hidalgo with Spain brought into the United States all or part of land for ten future states, including southwest Kansas. In 1854, the Kansas Territory was organized, then in 1861 Kansas became the 34th U.S. state.

=== 19th century ===
On February 26, 1867, Sumner County was created from parts of Marion and Butler counties. It was named in honor of Charles Sumner, a U.S. Senator from Massachusetts (1811–74), who was a strong advocate of Kansas becoming a free state.

In 1887, the Chicago, Kansas and Nebraska Railway built a branch line north–south from Herington to Caldwell. This branch line connected Herington, Lost Springs, Lincolnville, Antelope, Marion, Aulne, Peabody, Elbing, Whitewater, Furley, Kechi, Wichita, Peck, Corbin, Wellington and Caldwell. By 1893, this branch line was incrementally built to Fort Worth, Texas. This line is called the "OKT". The Chicago, Kansas and Nebraska Railway was foreclosed in 1891 and was taken over by Chicago, Rock Island and Pacific Railway, which shut down in 1980 and reorganized as Oklahoma, Kansas and Texas Railroad, merged in 1988 with Missouri Pacific Railroad, and finally merged in 1997 with Union Pacific Railroad. Most locals still refer to this railroad as the "Rock Island".

=== 21st century ===
In December 2011, the Kansas Star Casino opened approximately 4.5 miles (7.2 km) west of the center of Mulvane, adjacent to an exit on the Kansas Turnpike that was added in the mid-1980s. The casino is located just west of the turnpike exit.

== Geography ==
According to the U.S. Census Bureau, the county has a total area of 1,185 square miles (3,070 km^{2}), of which 1,182 square miles (3,060 km^{2}) is land and 3.0 square miles (7.8 km^{2}) (0.3%) is water.

=== Adjacent counties ===
- Sedgwick County (north)
- Butler County (northeast)
- Cowley County (east)
- Kay County, Oklahoma (southeast)
- Grant County, Oklahoma (southwest)
- Harper County (west)
- Kingman County (northwest)

== Demographics ==
Historical population
Census	Pop.	Note	%±
1870	22		—
1880	20,812		94,500.0%
1890	30,271		45.4%
1900	25,631		−15.3%
1910	30,654		19.6%
1920	29,213		−4.7%
1930	28,960		−0.9%
1940	26,163		−9.7%
1950	23,646		−9.6%
1960	25,316		7.1%
1970	23,553		−7.0%
1980	24,928		5.8%
1990	25,841		3.7%
2000	25,946		0.4%
2010	24,132		−7.0%
2020	22,382		−7.3%
2025 (est.)	22,312	▼	−0.3%
U.S. Decennial Census; 1790-1960 1900-1990; 1990-2000 2010-2020

Sumner County is part of the Wichita Metropolitan Statistical Area. It reached its historic peak population in 1910.

=== Racial and ethnic composition ===
Sumner County, Kansas – Racial and ethnic composition Note: the US Census treats Hispanic/Latino as an ethnic category. This table excludes Latinos from the racial categories and assigns them to a separate category. Hispanics/Latinos may be of any race.
Race / Ethnicity (NH = Non-Hispanic)	Pop 1980	Pop 1990	Pop 2000	Pop 2010	Pop 2020	% 1980	% 1990	% 2000	% 2010	% 2020
White alone (NH)	23,893	24,455	24,067	22,044	19,347	95.85%	94.64%	92.76%	91.35%	86.44%
Black or African American alone (NH)	136	138	175	211	200	0.55%	0.53%	0.67%	0.87%	0.89%
Native American or Alaska Native alone (NH)	155	280	258	255	215	0.62%	1.08%	0.99%	1.06%	0.96%
Asian alone (NH)	46	69	57	50	73	0.18%	0.27%	0.22%	0.21%	0.33%
Native Hawaiian or Pacific Islander alone (NH)	x	x	14	4	0	x	x	0.05%	0.02%	0.00%
Other race alone (NH)	2	11	8	12	93	0.01%	0.04%	0.03%	0.05%	0.42%
Mixed race or Multiracial (NH)	x	x	438	459	1,200	x	x	1.69%	1.90%	5.36%
Hispanic or Latino (any race)	696	888	929	1,097	1,254	2.79%	3.44%	3.58%	4.55%	5.60%
Total	24,928	25,841	25,946	24,132	22,382	100.00%	100.00%	100.00%	100.00%	100.00%

=== 2020 census ===
As of the 2020 census, the county had a population of 22,382. The median age was 41.9 years. 24.4% of residents were under the age of 18 and 20.2% of residents were 65 years of age or older. For every 100 females there were 100.4 males, and for every 100 females age 18 and over there were 99.2 males age 18 and over.

The racial makeup of the county was 89.1% White, 0.9% Black or African American, 1.1% American Indian and Alaska Native, 0.3% Asian, 0.0% Native Hawaiian and Pacific Islander, 1.6% from some other race, and 7.0% from two or more races. Hispanic or Latino residents of any race comprised 5.6% of the population.

37.4% of residents lived in urban areas, while 62.6% lived in rural areas.

There were 9,028 households in the county, of which 29.7% had children under the age of 18 living with them and 22.8% had a female householder with no spouse or partner present. About 28.8% of all households were made up of individuals and 13.8% had someone living alone who was 65 years of age or older.

There were 10,324 housing units, of which 12.6% were vacant. Among occupied housing units, 73.7% were owner-occupied and 26.3% were renter-occupied. The homeowner vacancy rate was 2.0% and the rental vacancy rate was 11.8%.

=== 2000 census ===
As of the census of 2000, there were 25,946 people, 9,888 households, and 7,089 families residing in the county. The population density was 22 people per square mile (8.5 people/km^{2}). There were 10,877 housing units at an average density of 9 per square mile (3.5/km^{2}). The racial makeup of the county was 94.62% White, 0.71% Black or African American, 1.05% Native American, 0.22% Asian, 0.05% Pacific Islander, 1.29% from other races, and 2.06% from two or more races. 3.58% of the population were Hispanic or Latino of any race.

There were 9,888 households, out of which 34.50% had children under the age of 18 living with them, 59.90% were married couples living together, 8.00% had a female householder with no husband present, and 28.30% were non-families. 25.60% of all households were made up of individuals, and 12.40% had someone living alone who was 65 years of age or older. The average household size was 2.58 and the average family size was 3.10.

In the county, the population was spread out, with 28.50% under the age of 18, 7.50% from 18 to 24, 26.20% from 25 to 44, 22.40% from 45 to 64, and 15.50% who were 65 years of age or older. The median age was 38 years. For every 100 females, there were 96.80 males. For every 100 females age 18 and over, there were 93.90 males.

The median income for a household in the county was $39,415, and the median income for a family was $46,739. Males had a median income of $36,616 versus $23,020 for females. The per capita income for the county was $18,305. About 7.20% of families and 9.50% of the population were below the poverty line, including 11.20% of those under age 18 and 6.80% of those age 65 or over.

== Government ==
=== Presidential elections ===
Sumner County, like many neighboring counties, often votes for the Republican Party in presidential elections. However, in 1992 independent candidate Ross Perot came within two percent of winning the county against George H. W. Bush. The last time the county voted for a Democratic candidate was Jimmy Carter in 1976, but towards the end of the Great Plains drought of the 1980s, Michael Dukakis managed to crack 40%, the last Democratic nominee to do so.

Presidential election results

United States presidential election results for Sumner County, Kansas
Year	Republican		Democratic		Third party(ies)	
Year	No.	%	No.	%	No.	%
1888	3,499	49.72%	2,139	30.39%	1,400	19.89%
1892	3,503	45.52%	0	0.00%	4,192	54.48%
1896	2,515	44.76%	3,048	54.24%	56	1.00%
1900	3,184	50.61%	2,982	47.40%	125	1.99%
1904	3,264	61.61%	1,489	28.10%	545	10.29%
1908	3,235	51.30%	2,772	43.96%	299	4.74%
1912	781	12.21%	2,557	39.97%	3,060	47.83%
1916	4,079	39.37%	5,519	53.27%	763	7.36%
1920	5,830	60.49%	3,454	35.84%	354	3.67%
1924	5,552	54.93%	2,556	25.29%	2,000	19.79%
1928	8,951	79.64%	2,108	18.75%	181	1.61%
1932	4,926	42.40%	6,353	54.68%	340	2.93%
1936	4,946	38.23%	7,966	61.57%	27	0.21%
1940	6,585	51.86%	5,988	47.16%	125	0.98%
1944	6,343	59.87%	4,187	39.52%	64	0.60%
1948	5,922	55.42%	4,571	42.78%	192	1.80%
1952	8,134	68.95%	3,567	30.24%	96	0.81%
1956	7,024	62.95%	4,088	36.64%	46	0.41%
1960	7,219	61.51%	4,462	38.02%	55	0.47%
1964	4,760	45.55%	5,574	53.34%	116	1.11%
1968	5,622	54.48%	3,562	34.52%	1,136	11.01%
1972	6,941	68.08%	2,685	26.34%	569	5.58%
1976	4,645	44.92%	5,385	52.08%	310	3.00%
1980	6,038	57.53%	3,761	35.83%	697	6.64%
1984	6,942	64.32%	3,708	34.36%	143	1.32%
1988	5,394	53.71%	4,417	43.99%	231	2.30%
1992	4,087	35.27%	3,564	30.76%	3,937	33.97%
1996	5,952	54.22%	3,638	33.14%	1,387	12.64%
2000	6,176	60.36%	3,549	34.69%	507	4.96%
2004	7,092	67.62%	3,217	30.67%	179	1.71%
2008	6,737	65.17%	3,353	32.44%	247	2.39%
2012	6,260	68.48%	2,658	29.08%	223	2.44%
2016	6,984	71.84%	2,076	21.35%	662	6.81%
2020	8,105	74.17%	2,591	23.71%	232	2.12%
2024	7,810	74.04%	2,527	23.95%	212	2.01%

=== Laws ===
Following amendment to the Kansas Constitution in 1986, Sumner County remained a prohibition, or "dry", county until 1992, when voters approved the sale of alcoholic liquor by the individual drink with a 30 percent food sales requirement.

== Education ==
=== Unified school districts ===
School districts covering parts of the county include:

- Mulvane USD 263
- Wellington USD 353
- Conway Springs USD 356
- Belle Plaine USD 357
- Oxford USD 358
- Argonia USD 359
- Caldwell USD 360
- South Haven USD 509
- Arkansas City USD 470
- Clearwater USD 264
- Kingman-Norwich USD 331
- Udall USD 463

== Communities ==
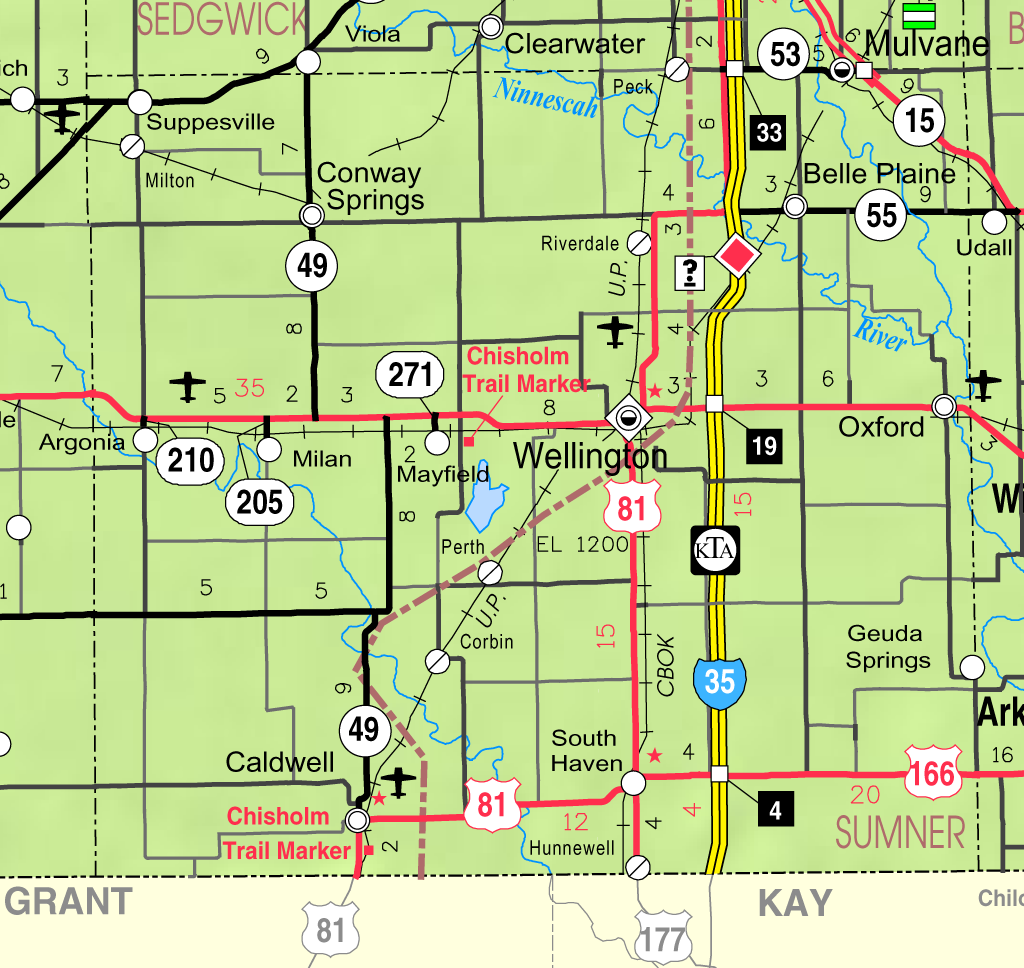
2005 map of Sumner County (map legend)

List of townships / incorporated cities / unincorporated communities / extinct former communities within Sumner County.

=== Cities ===
‡ means a community has portions in an adjacent county.

- Argonia
- Belle Plaine
- Caldwell
- Conway Springs
- Geuda Springs‡
- Hunnewell
- Mayfield
- Milan
- Mulvane‡
- Oxford
- South Haven
- Wellington (county seat)

=== Unincorporated communities ===
† means a community is designated a Census-Designated Place (CDP) by the United States Census Bureau.

- Adamsville
- Anson
- Ashton
- Cicero
- Corbin
- Dalton
- Drury
- Millerton
- Milton†
- Peck†‡
- Perth
- Portland
- Riverdale
- Rome
- Suppesville
- Zyba

=== Ghost towns ===
- Ewell

=== Townships ===
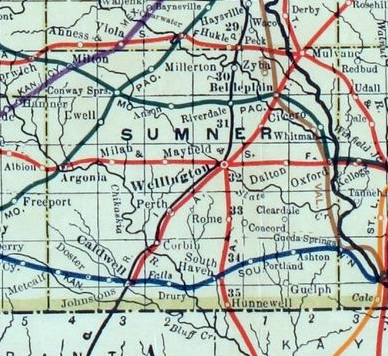
1915 railroad map of Sumner County

Sumner County is divided into thirty townships. The cities of Caldwell and Wellington are considered governmentally independent and are excluded from the census figures for the townships. In the following table, the population center is the largest city (or cities) included in that township's population total, if it is of a significant size.

Sources: 2000 U.S. Gazetteer from the U.S. Census Bureau.
Township	FIPS	Population center	Population	Population density /km^{2} (/sq mi)	Land area km^{2} (sq mi)	Water area km^{2} (sq mi)	Water %	Geographic coordinates
Avon	03575		319	3 (9)	93 (36)	0 (0)	0.03%	37°15′58″N 97°18′56″W
Belle Plaine	05525		3,504	33 (87)	105 (40)	1 (0)	0.69%	37°24′33″N 97°17′19″W
Bluff	07750		74	1 (1)	136 (53)	0 (0)	0%	37°3′19″N 97°44′18″W
Caldwell	09925		200	1 (4)	136 (52)	0 (0)	0.02%	37°3′42″N 97°37′52″W
Chikaskia	13150		69	1 (2)	94 (36)	0 (0)	0.02%	37°10′4″N 97°38′4″W
Conway	15300		1,286	14 (35)	94 (36)	0 (0)	0%	37°24′33″N 97°39′4″W
Creek	16300		241	3 (7)	95 (37)	0 (0)	0.05%	37°20′10″N 97°44′18″W
Dixon	18200		738	8 (20)	94 (36)	0 (0)	0%	37°15′55″N 97°45′44″W
Downs	18525		159	2 (5)	91 (35)	0 (0)	0%	37°10′43″N 97°31′12″W
Eden	19800		452	5 (12)	95 (37)	0 (0)	0%	37°25′45″N 97°45′36″W
Falls	22875		187	1 (3)	139 (54)	0 (0)	0%	37°4′48″N 97°31′52″W
Gore	26975		2,220	27 (70)	83 (32)	1 (1)	1.69%	37°26′56″N 97°12′28″W
Greene	28525		80	1 (2)	93 (36)	0 (0)	0.10%	37°10′28″N 97°18′26″W
Guelph	29175		164	1 (3)	141 (55)	0 (0)	0%	37°4′10″N 97°19′21″W
Harmon	30125		277	3 (9)	79 (31)	0 (0)	0%	37°21′31″N 97°19′6″W
Illinois	33800		178	2 (5)	94 (36)	0 (0)	0.05%	37°25′20″N 97°31′6″W
Jackson	34925		153	2 (4)	94 (36)	0 (0)	0.02%	37°10′36″N 97°24′38″W
London	42400		774	7 (19)	107 (41)	1 (0)	0.93%	37°26′4″N 97°24′32″W
Morris	48375		35	0 (1)	94 (36)	0 (0)	0%	37°10′35″N 97°44′17″W
Osborne	53335		273	3 (8)	92 (35)	1 (0)	1.30%	37°15′11″N 97°32′9″W
Oxford	53875		1,403	14 (37)	99 (38)	1 (0)	1.08%	37°16′29″N 97°10′31″W
Palestine	54175		249	3 (9)	72 (28)	1 (0)	1.26%	37°21′7″N 97°13′5″W
Ryan	61950		239	3 (7)	92 (36)	0 (0)	0%	37°15′37″N 97°38′51″W
Seventy-Six	64000		238	3 (7)	93 (36)	0 (0)	0%	37°21′15″N 97°24′40″W
South Haven	66675		670	5 (12)	140 (54)	0 (0)	0%	37°2′44″N 97°24′51″W
Springdale	67575		761	8 (21)	93 (36)	0 (0)	0%	37°21′57″N 97°38′54″W
Sumner	69225		150	2 (4)	94 (36)	0 (0)	0%	37°21′8″N 97°31′12″W
Valverde	73350		147	2 (4)	93 (36)	1 (0)	0.76%	37°11′5″N 97°12′13″W
Walton	75300		431	3 (8)	139 (54)	0 (0)	0%	37°4′43″N 97°11′36″W
Wellington	76500		344	4 (11)	81 (31)	0 (0)	0.06%	37°16′17″N 97°25′16″W

== See also ==
- National Register of Historic Places listings in Sumner County, Kansas
- Chisholm Trail

Community information for Kansas

- Kansas locations by per capita income
- List of counties in Kansas
- List of townships in Kansas
- List of cities in Kansas
- List of unincorporated communities in Kansas
- List of ghost towns in Kansas
