= Lincoln Township, Sedgwick County, Kansas =

Township in Sedgwick County, Kansas, U.S.

Lincoln Township Sedgwick County, Kansas
- Township
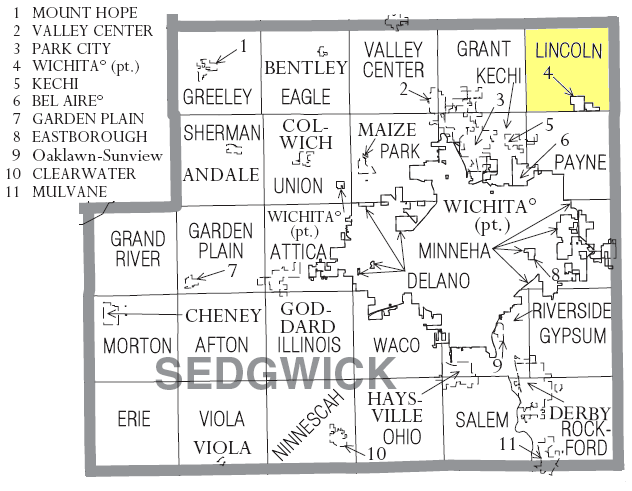
- Location within Sedgwick County

- Location within state of Kansas
- Coordinates: 37°52′10″N 97°12′26″W
- Country: United States
- State: Kansas
- County: Sedgwick
- Founded: 1871

Government
  - District 1 County Commissioner: Pete Meitzner

Area
  - Total: 36.435 sq mi (94.37 km^{2})
  - Land: 36.382 sq mi (94.23 km^{2})
  - Water: 0.053 sq mi (0.14 km^{2}) 0.15%
- Elevation: 1,401 ft (427 m)

Population (2020)
  - Total: 519
  - Density: 14.3/sq mi (5.51/km^{2})
- Time zone: UTC-6 (CST)
  - Summer (DST): UTC-5 (CDT)
- Area code: 316
- FIPS code: 20-41150
- GNIS ID: 473867

Lincoln Township is a township in Sedgwick County, Kansas, United States. As of the 2020 census, its population was 519.

== History ==
Lincoln Township was established in 1871. The first settler in what was to become Lincoln Township was Henry Engot from Switzerland, who settled there in 1870.

== Geography ==
Wildcat Creek flows through the township.

=== Communities ===
- Furley

=== Adjacent townships ===
Richland Township, Harvey County
Darlington Township, Harvey County	northwest	north	northeast	Milton Township, Butler County
Grant Township, Sedgwick County	west	self	east	Murdock Township, Butler County
Kechi Township, Sedgwick County	southwest	south	southeast	Benton Township, Butler County
Payne Township, Sedgwick County
