= Payne Township, Sedgwick County, Kansas =

Township in Sedgwick County, Kansas, U.S.

Payne Township Sedgwick County, Kansas
- Township
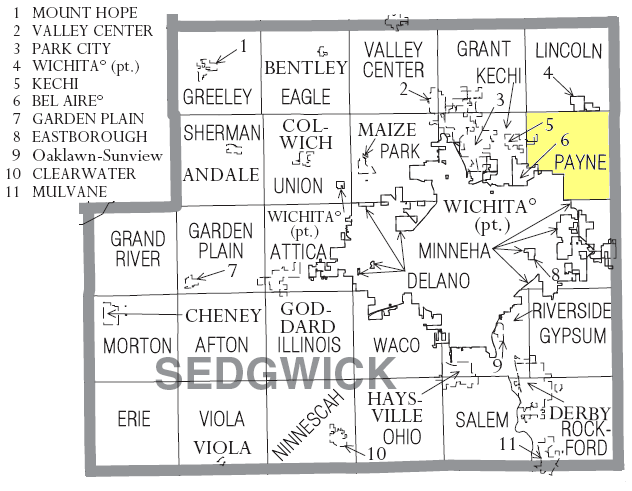
- Location within Sedgwick County

- Location within state of Kansas
- Coordinates: 37°46′55″N 97°12′31″W
- Country: United States
- State: Kansas
- County: Sedgwick
- Founded: 1870
- Named for: David L. Payne

Government
  - District 1 County Commissioner: Pete Meitzner

Area
  - Total: 25.622 sq mi (66.36 km^{2})
  - Land: 25.56 sq mi (66.2 km^{2})
  - Water: 0.062 sq mi (0.16 km^{2}) 0.24%
- Elevation: 1,401 ft (427 m)

Population (2020)
  - Total: 1,296
  - Density: 50.70/sq mi (19.58/km^{2})
- Time zone: UTC-6 (CST)
  - Summer (DST): UTC-5 (CDT)
- Area code: 620
- FIPS code: 20-55075
- GNIS ID: 473868
- Website: paynetownship.org

Payne Township is a township in Sedgwick County, Kansas, United States. As of the 2020 census, its population was 1,296.

== History ==
Payne Township was named for David L. Payne, a pioneer known as the "Father of Oklahoma", who was also the first settler in what was to become the township. Payne settled there on April 5, 1870. The township was established in the fall of 1870.

== Geography ==
=== Communities ===
- part of Kechi
- Greenwich

=== Adjacent townships ===
Lincoln Township, Sedgwick County
Grant Township, Sedgwick County	northwest	north
Kechi Township, Sedgwick County	west	self	east	Benton Township, Butler County
		south	southeast	Bruno Township, Butler County
Minneha Township, Sedgwick County

== Transportation ==
=== Major highways ===
- K-254
