= Gypsum Township, Sedgwick County, Kansas =

Township in Sedgwick County, Kansas, U.S.

Gypsum Township Sedgwick County, Kansas
- Township
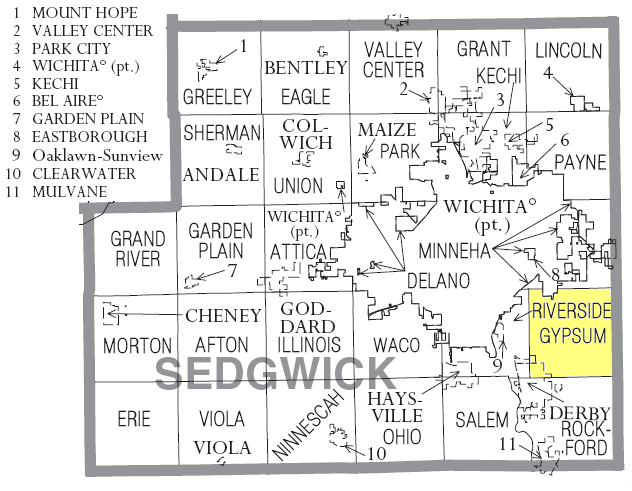
- Location within Sedgwick County

- Location within state of Kansas
- Coordinates: 37°36′25″N 97°12′31″W
- Country: United States
- State: Kansas
- County: Sedgwick
- Founded: 1871

Government
  - District 5 County Commissioner: Jim Howell

Area
  - Total: 34.514 sq mi (89.39 km^{2})
  - Land: 34.289 sq mi (88.81 km^{2})
  - Water: 0.225 sq mi (0.58 km^{2}) 0.65%
- Elevation: 1,348 ft (411 m)

Population (2020)
  - Total: 9,959
  - Density: 290.4/sq mi (112.1/km^{2})
- Time zone: UTC-6 (CST)
  - Summer (DST): UTC-5 (CDT)
- Area code: 316
- FIPS code: 20-29300
- GNIS ID: 474213

Gypsum Township is a township in Sedgwick County, Kansas, United States. As of the 2020 census, its population was 9,959.

== History ==
Gypsum Township was established on March 2, 1871. The first settler in what was to become Gypsum Township was Joseph Gifford, who settled there in 1868. Riverside Township was created from part of Gypsum Township and Waco Township in the 1910s.

== Geography ==
Spring Creek flows through the township. Gypsum Township also completely surrounds some exclaves of Wichita.

=== Communities ===
- part of Derby
- part of McConnell Air Force Base

=== Adjacent townships ===
Minneha Township, Sedgwick County
		north	northeast	Bruno Township, Butler County
Riverside Township, Sedgwick County	west	self	east	Pleasant Township, Butler County
		south	southeast	Richland Township, Butler County
Rockford Township, Sedgwick County

== Transportation ==
Cessna Aircraft Field lies partially within Gypsum Township.
