= Grant Township, Sedgwick County, Kansas =

Township in Sedgwick County, Kansas, U.S.

Grant Township Sedgwick County, Kansas
- Township
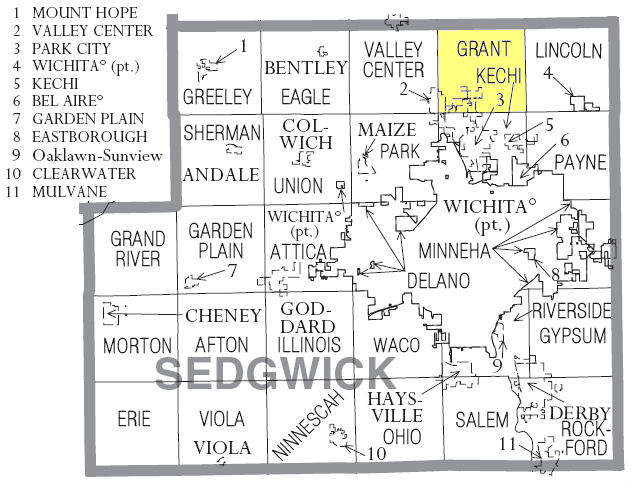
- Location within Sedgwick County

- Location within state of Kansas
- Coordinates: 37°52′05″N 97°19′01″W
- Country: United States
- State: Kansas
- County: Sedgwick
- Named for: Ulysses S. Grant

Government
  - District 4 County Commissioner: Ryan Baty

Area
  - Total: 35.94 sq mi (93.1 km^{2})
  - Land: 35.77 sq mi (92.6 km^{2})
  - Water: 0.17 sq mi (0.44 km^{2})
- Elevation: 1,440 ft (440 m)

Population (2020)
  - Total: 5,465
  - Density: 152.8/sq mi (58.99/km^{2})
- Time zone: UTC-6 (CST)
  - Summer (DST): UTC-5 (CDT)
- Area code: 316
- FIPS code: 20-28125
- GNIS ID: 473829

Grant Township is a township in Sedgwick County, Kansas, United States. As of the 2020 census, its population was 5,465.

== History ==
Grant Township was named after Ulysses S. Grant. The first settler in the township was the murderer and criminal Alexander Jester, who settled there in January 1868.

== Geography ==
=== Communities ===
- part of Kechi
- part of Park City
- part of Valley Center

=== Adjacent townships ===
Darlington Township, Harvey County
Sedgwick Township, Harvey County	northwest	north	northeast	Richland Township, Harvey County
Valley Center Township, Sedgwick County	west	self	east	Lincoln Township, Sedgwick County
Park Township, Sedgwick County	southwest	south	southeast	Payne Township, Sedgwick County
Kechi Township, Sedgwick County

== Transportation ==
=== Major highways ===
- I-135
- US-81
- K-15
