= Minneha Township, Kansas =

Township in Sedgwick County, Kansas, U.S.

Minneha Township Sedgwick County, Kansas
- Township
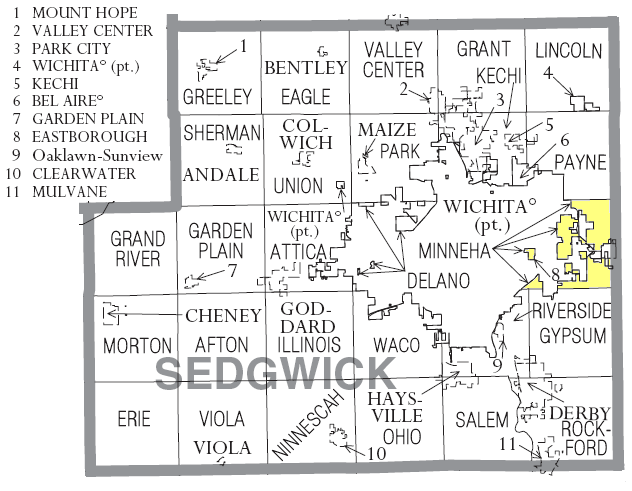
- Location within Sedgwick County

- Location within state of Kansas
- Coordinates: 37°41′35″N 97°12′31″W
- Country: United States
- State: Kansas
- County: Sedgwick
- Founded: 1871

Government
  - Districts 1 and 5 County Commissioners: Pete Meitzner and Jim Howell

Area
  - Total: 9.532 sq mi (24.69 km^{2})
  - Land: 9.348 sq mi (24.21 km^{2})
  - Water: 0.184 sq mi (0.48 km^{2}) 1.93%
- Elevation: 1,335 ft (407 m)

Population (2020)
  - Total: 3,365
  - Density: 360.0/sq mi (139.0/km^{2})
- Time zone: UTC-6 (CST)
  - Summer (DST): UTC-5 (CDT)
- Area code: 620
- FIPS code: 20-47125
- GNIS ID: 474228
- Website: minnehatownship.com

Minneha Township is a township in Sedgwick County, Kansas, United States. As of the 2020 census, its population was 3,365.

== History ==
Minneha Township was established in October of 1871. The first settlers in what was to become Minneha Township was W. D. Highly and his family, who settled there in 1870. In 1963, the township of Wichita was dissolved due to being mostly overtaken by Wichita, with its remaining land divided up between Delano Township, Kechi Township, and Minneha Township.

== Geography ==
Spring Branch and Fourmile Creek flow through the township. Minneha Township completely surrounds multiple exclaves of the city of Wichita, as well as Wichita surrounding multiple exclaves of Minneha Township.

=== Communities ===
- Eastborough

=== Adjacent townships ===
Payne Township, Sedgwick County
		north	northeast	Benton Township, Butler County
		self	east	Bruno Township, Butler County
Riverside Township, Sedgwick County	southwest	south	southeast	Pleasant Township, Butler County
Gypsum Township, Sedgwick County

== Transportation ==
Two airports lie partially within Minneha Township: Beech Factory Airport and Cessna Aircraft Field.

=== Major highways ===
- I-35 / Kansas Turnpike
- US-54
- US-400
- K-96
