= Kechi Township, Kansas =

Township in Sedgwick County, Kansas, U.S.

Kechi Township Sedgwick County, Kansas
- Township
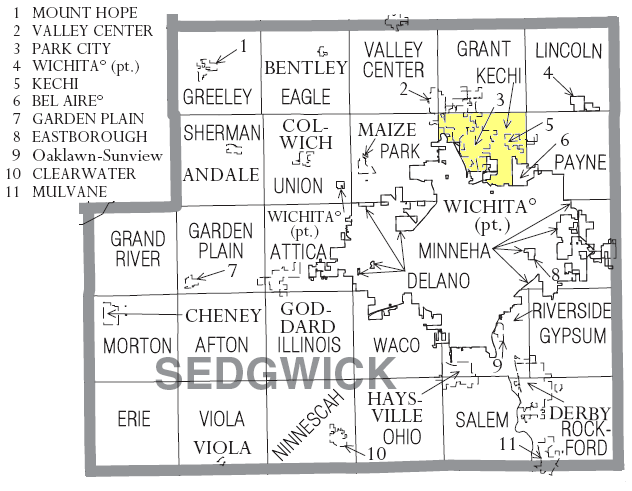
- Location within Sedgwick County

- Location within state of Kansas
- Coordinates: 37°46′55″N 97°19′01″W
- Country: United States
- State: Kansas
- County: Sedgwick
- Founded: 1871

Government
  - Districts 1 and 4 County Commissioners: Pete Meitzner and Ryan Baty

Area
  - Total: 19.304 sq mi (50.00 km^{2})
  - Land: 19.185 sq mi (49.69 km^{2})
  - Water: 0.119 sq mi (0.31 km^{2}) 0.62%
- Elevation: 1,381 ft (421 m)

Population (2020)
  - Total: 9,776
  - Density: 509.6/sq mi (196.7/km^{2})
- Time zone: UTC-6 (CST)
  - Summer (DST): UTC-5 (CDT)
- Area code: 316
- FIPS code: 20-36250
- GNIS ID: 473863

Kechi Township is a township in Sedgwick County, Kansas, United States. As of the 2020 census, its population was 9,776.

== History ==
Kechi Township was established in 1871. The first settler in what was to become Kechi Township was John Allison, who settled there in the fall of 1868. In 1963, the township of Wichita was dissolved due to being mostly overtaken by Wichita, with its remaining land divided up between Delano Township, Kechi Township, and Minneha Township. Since then, the parts of Wichita Township that Kechi Township absorbed have all been incorporated into Wichita.

== Geography ==
The Little Arkansas River and Chisholm Creek flow through the township. Kechi Township completely surrounds multiple exclaves of the city of Wichita.

=== Communities ===
- part of Kechi
- part of Park City
- part of Valley Center

=== Adjacent townships ===
Grant Township, Sedgwick County
Valley Center Township, Sedgwick County	northwest	north	northeast	Lincoln Township, Sedgwick County
Park Township, Sedgwick County	west	self	east	Payne Township, Sedgwick County

== Transportation ==
=== Major highways ===
- I-135
- I-235
- US-81
- K-15
- K-96
- K-254
