= Clay Township, Kansas =

Clay Township, Kansas may refer to:

- Clay Township, Butler County, Kansas
- Clay Township, Reno County, Kansas

== See also ==
- List of Kansas townships
- Clay Township (disambiguation)
