= Rockford Township, Kansas =

Township in Sedgwick County, Kansas, U.S.

Rockford Township Sedgwick County, Kansas
- Township
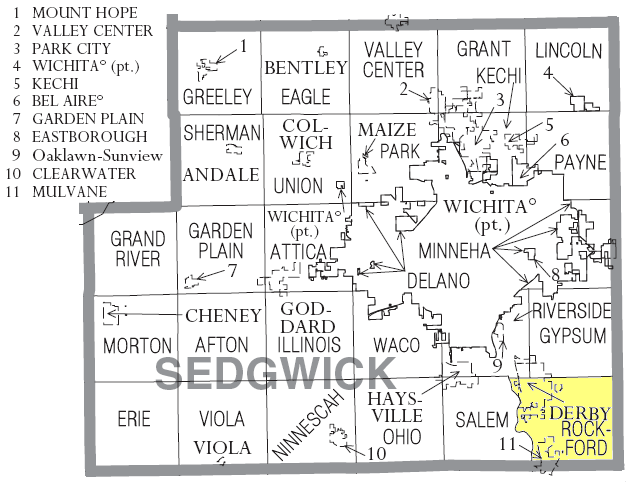
- Location within Sedgwick County

- Location within state of Kansas
- Coordinates: 37°31′10″N 97°12′26″W
- Country: United States
- State: Kansas
- County: Sedgwick
- Founded: 1871

Government
  - District 5 County Commissioner: Jim Howell

Area
  - Total: 39.35 sq mi (101.9 km^{2})
  - Land: 38.96 sq mi (100.9 km^{2})
  - Water: 0.39 sq mi (1.0 km^{2})
- Elevation: 1,303 ft (397 m)

Population (2020)
  - Total: 23,462
  - Density: 602.2/sq mi (232.5/km^{2})
- Time zone: UTC-6 (CST)
  - Summer (DST): UTC-5 (CDT)
- Area code: 620
- FIPS code: 20-60675
- GNIS ID: 474358

Rockford Township is a township in Sedgwick County, Kansas, United States. As of the 2020 census, its population was 23,462.

== History ==
Rockford Township was established on May 2, 1871. The first settler in what would become Rockford Township was Henry Stein, who settled there in June of 1869.

== Geography ==
The Arkansas River flows through the township, as well as Spring Creek

=== Communities ===
- part of Derby
- part of Mulvane

=== Adjacent townships ===
Gypsum Township, Sedgwick County
Riverside Township, Sedgwick County	northwest	north	northeast	Pleasant Township, Butler County
Salem Township, Sedgwick County	west	self	east	Richland Township, Butler County
Belle Plaine Township, Sumner County	southwest	south	southeast	Maple Township, Cowley County
Gore Township, Sumner County

== Transportation ==
=== Major highways ===
- K-15
- K-53
