= Gypsum Township =

Gypsum Township may refer to:

- Gypsum Township, Saline County, Kansas
- Gypsum Township, Sedgwick County, Kansas
