= Delano Township =

Delano Township may refer to the following townships in the United States:

- Delano Township, Sedgwick County, Kansas
- Delano Township, Pennsylvania
