= Eastborough, Kansas =

City in Sedgwick County, Kansas

- City
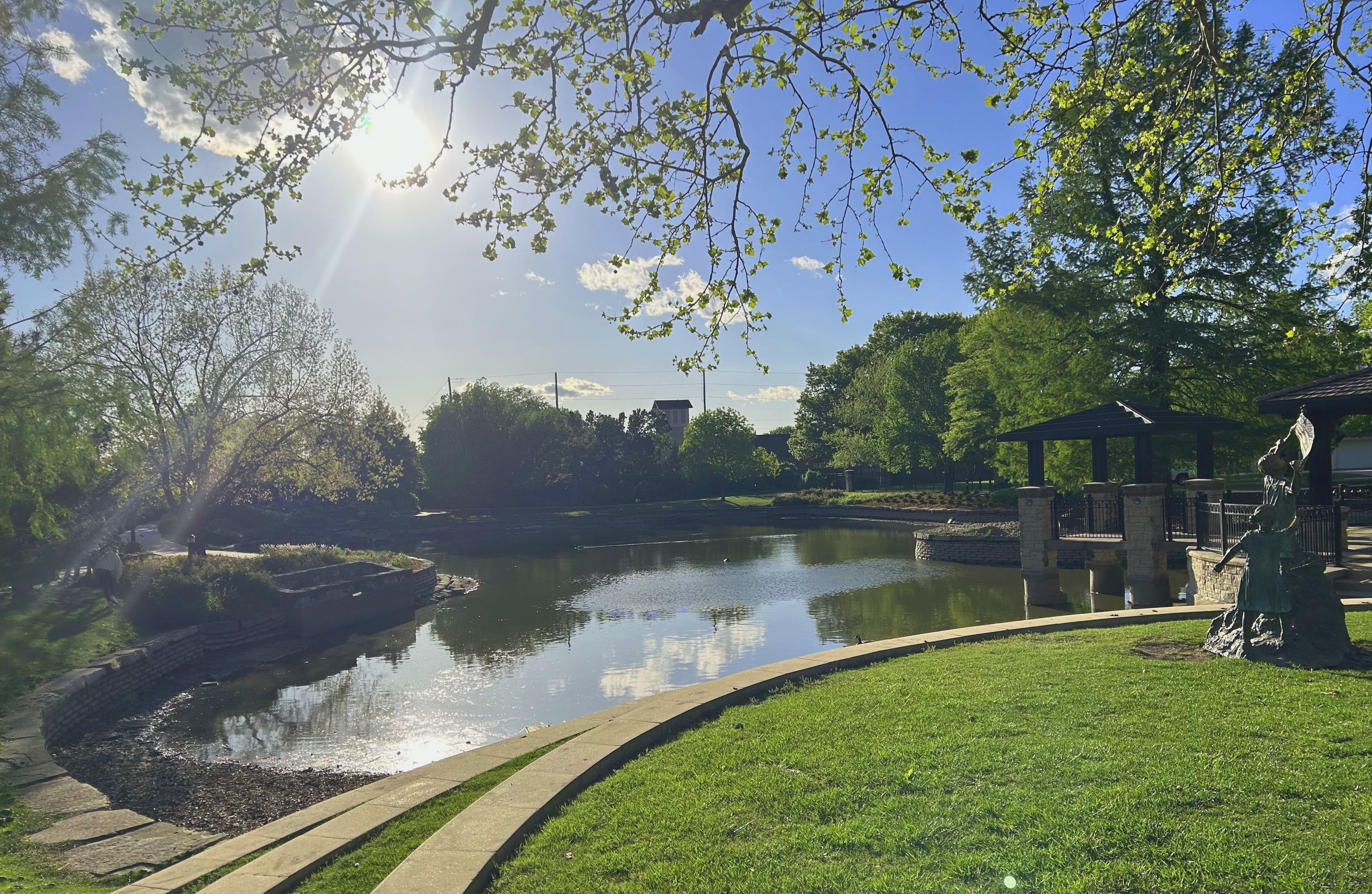
- Eastborough Park

- Location within Sedgwick County and Kansas
- Interactive map of Eastborough, Kansas
- Coordinates: 37°41′11″N 97°15′32″W
- Country: United States
- State: Kansas
- County: Sedgwick
- Township: Minneha
- Founded: 1929
- Incorporated: 1937
- Named for: East borough of Wichita

Government
  - Type: Mayor–Council
  - Mayor: Daniel Wallace

Area
  - Total: 0.39 sq mi (1.00 km^{2})
  - Land: 0.39 sq mi (1.00 km^{2})
  - Water: 0 sq mi (0.00 km^{2})
- Elevation: 1,371 ft (418 m)

Population (2020)
  - Total: 756
  - Density: 1,960/sq mi (756/km^{2})
- Time zone: UTC−6 (CST)
  - Summer (DST): UTC−5 (CDT)
- ZIP Codes: 67206–67208
- Area code: 316
- FIPS code: 20-19300
- GNIS ID: 474118
- Website: eastborough-ks.gov

Eastborough is a city in Sedgwick County, Kansas, United States, and an enclave of the city of Wichita. As of the 2020 census, the population of the city was 756.

== History ==
Eastborough was originally envisioned by Burdon Hunter, a British architect. The first development in the Eastborough area began in 1929, but the discovery of oil in the area postponed its establishment until the middle of the 1930s. Sale of Eastborough Village started April 10, 1929. It was planned to incorporate when the first thirty homes were completed, but Eastborough found itself in disputes with the neighboring Woodlawn subdivision, i. e. they could not agree upon a name for the street between them. The disputes were resolved after the two agreed to apply together for incorporation, and Eastborough and Woodlawn were incorporated as the city of Eastborough on June 1, 1937.

Eastborough became known as a "speed trap", because it has a lower speed limit than Wichita, which surrounds it. The speed limit of Douglas Avenue on both sides in Wichita is 30 miles per hour, whereas it was 20 miles per hour in Eastborough, a reduction of 33%. Eastborough has many residents who regularly walk in the streets of the city. There are no sidewalks in Eastborough, which is why the city has a lower speed limit. This issue became well known after Towne East Square shopping center was built east of Eastborough in 1975, because Wichita residents would commonly travel through Eastborough to get to Towne East since nearby Kellogg Avenue had traffic congestion problems. After Wichita completed an overhaul of nearby east Kellogg in 2009, Douglas Avenue was no longer the best route to Towne East.

The city gave up some land to the expansion of Kellogg/U.S. Route 54 on its southern boundary in 2002 and a wall was constructed along the southern boundary. As part of this construction, a new pond and playground was constructed and opened in 2003.

== Geography ==
Eastborough is located at 37°41′11″N 97°15′32″W (37.6864752, -97.2588378). According to the United States Census Bureau, the city has a total area of 0.40 square miles (1.04 km^{2}), all land.

Its southern boundary is Kellogg/U.S. Route 54, and its northern boundary is 2nd Street, and mostly on the east side of Woodlawn St.

== Demographics ==
Historical population
Census	Pop.	Note	%±
1940	312		—
1950	708		126.9%
1960	1,001		41.4%
1970	1,141		14.0%
1980	854		−25.2%
1990	896		4.9%
2000	826		−7.8%
2010	773		−6.4%
2020	756		−2.2%
U.S. Decennial Census

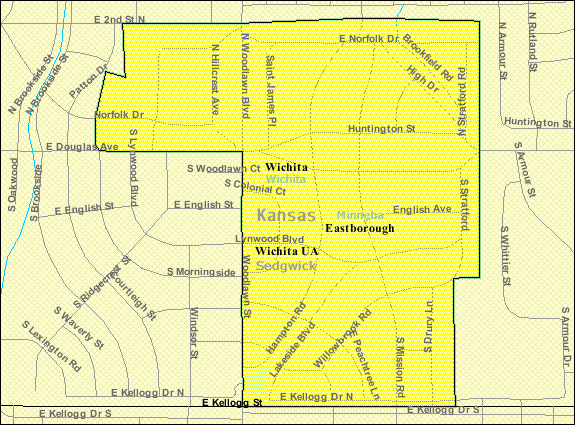
Detailed map of Eastborough

Eastborough is part of the Wichita, KS Metropolitan Statistical Area.

=== 2020 census ===
The 2020 United States census counted 756 people, 289 households, and 236 families in Eastborough. The population density was 1,963.6 per square mile (758.2/km^{2}). There were 313 housing units at an average density of 813.0 per square mile (313.9/km^{2}). The racial makeup was 92.33% (698) white or European American (90.48% non-Hispanic white), 1.19% (9) black or African-American, 0.93% (7) Native American or Alaska Native, 1.06% (8) Asian, 0.0% (0) Pacific Islander or Native Hawaiian, 0.4% (3) from other races, and 4.1% (31) from two or more races. Hispanic or Latino of any race was 3.17% (24) of the population.

Of the 289 households, 31.1% had children under the age of 18; 74.7% were married couples living together; 12.8% had a female householder with no spouse or partner present. 13.5% of households consisted of individuals and 6.2% had someone living alone who was 65 years of age or older. The average household size was 2.2 and the average family size was 2.7. The percent of those with a bachelor's degree or higher was estimated to be 60.3% of the population.

20.8% of the population was under the age of 18, 7.5% from 18 to 24, 17.5% from 25 to 44, 29.5% from 45 to 64, and 24.7% who were 65 years of age or older. The median age was 49.2 years. For every 100 females, there were 98.4 males. For every 100 females ages 18 and older, there were 97.0 males.

The 2016−2020 5-year American Community Survey estimates show that the median household income was $138,750 (with a margin of error of +/- $42,513) and the median family income was $146,458 (+/- $56,389). Males had a median income of $79,000 (+/- $21,507) versus $40,577 (+/- $8,422) for females. The median income for those above 16 years old was $47,016 (+/- $9,605). Approximately, 2.8% of families and 3.7% of the population were below the poverty line, including 11.5% of those under the age of 18 and 0.9% of those ages 65 or over.

=== 2010 census ===
As of the census of 2010, there were 773 people, 306 households, and 223 families residing in the city. The population density was 1,932.5 inhabitants per square mile (746.1/km^{2}). There were 328 housing units at an average density of 820.0 per square mile (316.6/km^{2}). The racial makeup of the city was 96.8% White, 0.9% African American, 0.4% Native American, 0.9% Asian, 0.3% from other races, and 0.8% from two or more races. Hispanic or Latino of any race were 0.8% of the population.

There were 306 households, of which 32.0% had children under the age of 18 living with them, 68.6% were married couples living together, 2.0% had a female householder with no husband present, 2.3% had a male householder with no wife present, and 27.1% were non-families. 23.2% of all households were made up of individuals, and 7.5% had someone living alone who was 65 years of age or older. The average household size was 2.53 and the average family size was 3.01.

The median age in the city was 46.3 years. 26.1% of residents were under the age of 18; 4.1% were between the ages of 18 and 24; 17.7% were from 25 to 44; 37.9% were from 45 to 64; and 14.2% were 65 years of age or older. The gender makeup of the city was 49.2% male and 50.8% female.

== Government ==
The Eastborough government consists of a mayor and five council members. The council meets the fourth Tuesday of each month at 5:30 pm.

== Education ==
The city is served by Wichita USD 259 public school district.

The school zoning is as follows: Most of the municipality is in the boundaries of Price-Harris Communications Magnet School (elementary) and Coleman Middle School. Parts west of Woodlawn are zoned to Hyde International Studies Magnet School (for elementary) and Robinson Middle School. All areas are zoned to Wichita East High School.

== Infrastructure ==
Eastborough contracts with the city of Wichita for water purification, sewage treatment, and fire protection service.

== Notable people ==
- Olive Ann Beech (1903−1993), aviation entrepreneur
