= Glencoe Township =

Glencoe Township may refer to the following townships in the United States:

- Glencoe Township, Butler County, Kansas
- Glencoe Township, McLeod County, Minnesota
