= Union Township, Butler County, Kansas =

Union Township Butler County, Kansas
- Township
- Location within Butler County

- Location within Kansas
- Coordinates: 37°31′33″N 96°35′0″W
- Country: United States
- State: Kansas
- County: Butler

Area
  - Total: 62.54 sq mi (161.98 km^{2})
  - Land: 62.09 sq mi (160.81 km^{2})
  - Water: 0.45 sq mi (1.17 km^{2}) 0.72%
- Elevation: 1,529 ft (466 m)

Population (2000)
  - Total: 226
  - Density: 3.64/sq mi (1.41/km^{2})
- Time zone: UTC-6 (CST)
  - Summer (DST): UTC-5 (CDT)
- FIPS code: 20-72050
- GNIS ID: 469948
- Website: County website

Union Township is a township in Butler County, Kansas, United States. As of the 2000 census, its population was 226.

== History ==
Union Township was organized in 1879.

== Geography ==
Union Township covers an area of 62.54 square miles (162.0 km^{2}) and contains one incorporated settlement, Latham. According to the USGS, it contains one cemetery, Latham.
