= Clifford Township =

Clifford Township may refer to the following townships in the United States:

- Clifford Township, Butler County, Kansas
- Clifford Township, Susquehanna County, Pennsylvania
