= Augusta Township =

Augusta Township may refer to:

== Canada ==
- Augusta township, Ontario

== United States ==
- Augusta Township, Hancock County, Illinois
- Augusta Township, Butler County, Kansas
- Augusta Charter Township, Michigan
- Augusta Township, Lac qui Parle County, Minnesota
- Augusta Township, Carroll County, Ohio
- Augusta Township, Northumberland County, Pennsylvania
