= Hickory Township, Kansas =

Hickory Township Butler County, Kansas
- Township
- Location within Butler County

- Location within Kansas
- Coordinates: 37°36′25″N 096°37′26″W
- Country: United States
- State: Kansas
- County: Butler

Area
  - Total: 62.87 sq mi (162.83 km^{2})
  - Land: 62.45 sq mi (161.74 km^{2})
  - Water: 0.42 sq mi (1.09 km^{2}) 0.67%
- Elevation: 1,467 ft (447 m)

Population (2000)
  - Total: 90
  - Density: 1.4/sq mi (0.56/km^{2})
- Time zone: UTC-6 (CST)
  - Summer (DST): UTC-5 (CDT)
- FIPS code: 20-31750
- GNIS ID: 474846
- Website: County website

Hickory Township is a township in Butler County, Kansas, United States. As of the 2000 census, its population was 90.

== History ==
Hickory Township was organized in 1875. Its early history is retold by J.O. Evertson, an early settler, in Vol. P. Mooney's, History of Butler County Kansas, Standard Publishing Company, 1916.

According to Evertson, the first settler was a man by the name of Myers. He and his two wives settled at the forks of two branches of Hickory Creek. Subsequently, in 1868, J. A. McGinnis and his brother A. F. McGinnis and family established their claims in the township. J.A. Armstrong then arrived and took up Myers claim, compelling him to move on, along with his two wives. Armstrong would establish a general store at a location called Old Brownlow, which since has disappeared with the exception of Brownlow Cemetery which rests on a rise in the hill.

On June 16, 1871, a cyclone, having destroyed the city of El Dorado, touched down in Hickory Township and did damage to the timber. In the fall of 1873, a prairie fire, originating near El Dorado, driven by a northwest wind swept across the land, driving "coyotes, deer and other wild inhabitants of the prairie scurrying before it, leaping streams as it came to them and leaving desolation in its wake, surging on toward the Indian Territory." In July 1874, following a prolonged drought, an invasion of millions of grasshoppers began in the eastern part of Kansas and Hickory Township, causing great loss to crops. In the early days, law enforcement was rare, law abiding citizens including Dr. McGinnis formed groups, some called vigilantes, to keep offenders in check.

The township was formed in 1875, on April 6, 1875, an election was held at J. A. McGinnis' home.

== Geography ==
Hickory Township covers an area of 62.87 square miles (162.8 km^{2}) and contains no incorporated settlements. According to the USGS, it contains one cemetery, Brownlow.

The streams of Honey Creek, North Branch Hickory Creek, South Branch Hickory Creek and Stony Branch run through this township.
