= Towanda Township, Butler County, Kansas =

Towanda Township Butler County, Kansas
- Township
- Location within Butler County

- Location within Kansas
- Coordinates: 37°46′55″N 96°59′21″W
- Country: United States
- State: Kansas
- County: Butler

Area
  - Total: 36.00 sq mi (93.25 km^{2})
  - Land: 35.95 sq mi (93.12 km^{2})
  - Water: 0.050 sq mi (0.13 km^{2}) 0.14%
- Elevation: 1,306 ft (398 m)

Population (2000)
  - Total: 2,727
  - Density: 75.85/sq mi (29.28/km^{2})
- Time zone: UTC-6 (CST)
  - Summer (DST): UTC-5 (CDT)
- FIPS code: 20-71150
- GNIS ID: 474577
- Website: County website

Towanda Township is a township in Butler County, Kansas, United States. As of the 2000 census, its population was 2,727.

== History ==
Towanda Township was established in 1867. Towanda is an Osage-language name meaning "many waters".

== Geography ==
Towanda Township covers an area of 36 square miles (93 km^{2}) and contains one incorporated settlement, Towanda. According to the USGS, it contains one cemetery, Sutton.

The streams of Badger Creek, Spring Branch and West Branch Whitewater River run through this township.

== Transportation ==
Towanda Township contains one airport or landing strip, Greer Miller Landing Strip.
