= Sedgwick County Extension Arboretum =

Arboretum in Sedgwick County, Kansas, US

Coordinates: 37°43′21″N 97°25′18″W

- Interactive map of Sedgwick County Extension Arboretum
- Website: Official website

The Sedgwick County Extension Arboretum is located in Sedgwick County, Kansas, United States, at 7001 W. 21st North Wichita, Kansas. It was established in 1994 and formally dedicated on Thursday, October 23, 2003.

The Arboretum currently contains 195 trees, representing 97 species adapted to south central Kansas. Each is marked with its name.

== See also ==
- List of botanical gardens in the United States
