= Delano Township, Kansas =

Township in Sedgwick County, Kansas, U.S.

Delano Township Sedgwick County, Kansas
- Township
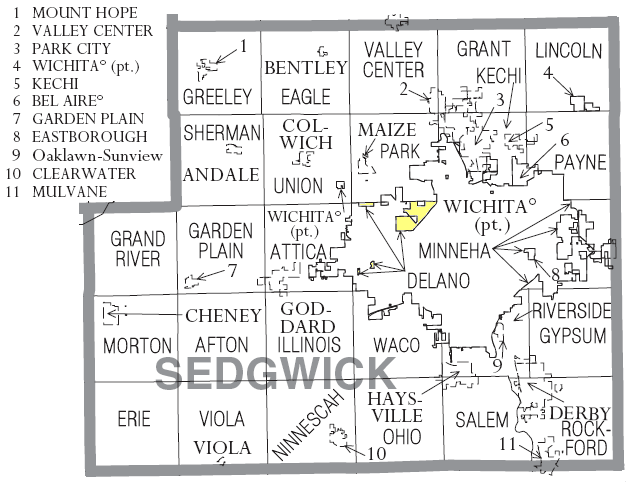
- Location within Sedgwick County

- Location within state of Kansas
- Coordinates: 37°44′00″N 97°26′01″W
- Country: United States
- State: Kansas
- County: Sedgwick
- Founded: 1871

Government
  - District 3 County Commissioner: Stephanie Wise

Area
  - Total: 1.375 sq mi (3.56 km^{2})
  - Land: 1.181 sq mi (3.06 km^{2})
  - Water: 0.194 sq mi (0.50 km^{2}) 14.11%
- Elevation: 1,312 ft (400 m)

Population (2020)
  - Total: 11
  - Density: 9.3/sq mi (3.6/km^{2})
- Time zone: UTC-6 (CST)
  - Summer (DST): UTC-5 (CDT)
- Area code: 316
- FIPS code: 20-17375
- GNIS ID: 1729698

Delano Township is a township in Sedgwick County, Kansas, United States. As of the 2020 census, its population was 11.

== History ==
Delano Township was established in 1871. The first settler in what would become Delano Township was Isaac Walker in 1869. In 1963, the township of Wichita was dissolved due to being mostly overtaken by Wichita, with its remaining land divided up between Delano Township, Kechi Township, and Minneha Township. Since then, Delano Township has also lost most of its land to the expanding city, becoming various neighborhoods of the city. What remains of the township is mostly made up of the Sedgwick County Park and Zoo.

== Geography ==
The MS Mitch Mitchell Floodway as part of the Arkansas River flows through the township. The township is completely surrounded by the city of Wichita.
