= Riverside Township, Kansas =

Township in Sedgwick County, Kansas, U.S.

Riverside Township Sedgwick County, Kansas
- Township
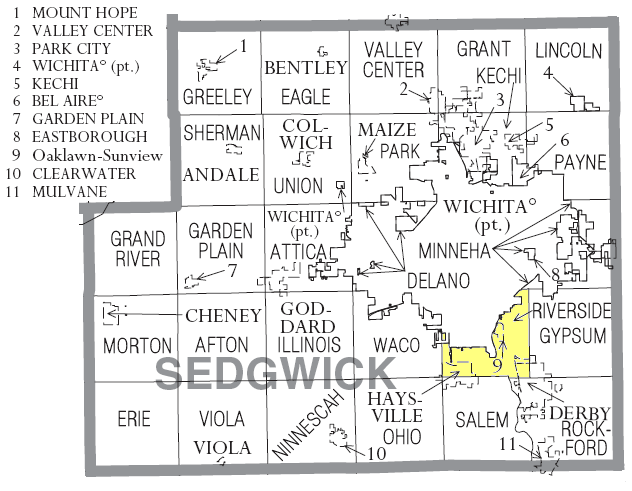
- Location within Sedgwick County

- Location within state of Kansas
- Coordinates: 37°36′05″N 97°18′56″W
- Country: United States
- State: Kansas
- County: Sedgwick
- Founded: 1910s

Government
  - Districts 2 and 5 County Commissioners: Jeff Blubaugh and Jim Howell

Area
  - Total: 15.054 sq mi (38.99 km^{2})
  - Land: 14.669 sq mi (37.99 km^{2})
  - Water: 0.385 sq mi (1.00 km^{2}) 2.56%
- Elevation: 1,316 ft (401 m)

Population (2020)
  - Total: 13,175
  - Density: 898.15/sq mi (346.78/km^{2})
- Time zone: UTC-6 (CST)
  - Summer (DST): UTC-5 (CDT)
- Area code: 620
- FIPS code: 20-60125
- GNIS ID: 474180

Riverside Township is a township in Sedgwick County, Kansas, United States. As of the 2020 census, its population was 13,175.

== History ==
Riverside Township was created from part of Gypsum Township and Waco Township in the 1910s.

== Geography ==
The Arkansas River and MS Mitch Mitchell Floodway flow through the township. Multiple exclaves of the city of Wichita are completely surrounded by Riverside Township.

=== Communities ===
- part of Derby
- part of Haysville
- part of McConnell Air Force Base
- Oaklawn-Sunview

=== Adjacent townships ===
			northeast	Minneha Township, Sedgwick County
Waco Township, Sedgwick County	west	self	east	Gypsum Township, Sedgwick County
Ohio Township, Sedgwick County	southwest	south	southeast	Rockford Township, Sedgwick County
Salem Township, Sedgwick County

== Transportation ==
=== Major highways ===
- I-35 / Kansas Turnpike
- US-81
- K-15
