= Waco, Kansas =

Unincorporated community in Sedgwick County, Kansas, United States

Coordinates: 37°31′14.07″N 97°18′27.16″W

Waco is an unincorporated community in Sedgwick County, Kansas, United States. It is located south of Haysville at the intersection of 95th Street South and US Route 81 Highway.

== History ==
Waco had a post office from 1873 to 1905.
