= El Dorado Township, Kansas =

El Dorado Township Butler County, Kansas
- Township
- Location within Butler County

- Location within Kansas
- Coordinates: 37°48′00″N 096°51′36″W
- Country: United States
- State: Kansas
- County: Butler

Area
  - Total: 54.74 sq mi (141.78 km^{2})
  - Land: 53.9 sq mi (139.7 km^{2})
  - Water: 0.80 sq mi (2.07 km^{2}) 1.46%
- Elevation: 1,289 ft (393 m)

Population (2000)
  - Total: 1,700
  - Density: 32/sq mi (12/km^{2})
- Time zone: UTC-6 (CST)
  - Summer (DST): UTC-5 (CDT)
- FIPS code: 20-20100
- GNIS ID: 474388
- Website: County website

El Dorado Township is a township in Butler County, Kansas, United States. As of the 2000 census, its population was 1,700.

== History ==
El Dorado Township was organized in 1867.

== Geography ==
El Dorado Township covers an area of 54.74 square miles (141.8 km^{2}) and contains one incorporated settlement, El Dorado (the county seat). According to the USGS, it contains three cemeteries: Belle Vista, Sunset Lawns and Walnut Valley Memorial Park.

The streams of Constant Creek, Sutton Creek and West Branch Walnut River run through this township.

== Transportation ==
El Dorado Township contains one airport or landing strip, El Dorado Municipal Airport.
