= Spring Township, Kansas =

Spring Township Butler County, Kansas
- Township
- Location within Butler County

- Location within Kansas
- Coordinates: 37°41′40″N 096°52′51″W
- Country: United States
- State: Kansas
- County: Butler

Area
  - Total: 36.27 sq mi (93.94 km^{2})
  - Land: 36.22 sq mi (93.81 km^{2})
  - Water: 0.050 sq mi (0.13 km^{2}) 0.14%
- Elevation: 1,299 ft (396 m)

Population (2000)
  - Total: 1,566
  - Density: 43.24/sq mi (16.69/km^{2})
- Time zone: UTC-6 (CST)
  - Summer (DST): UTC-5 (CDT)
- FIPS code: 20-67275
- GNIS ID: 474827
- Website: County website

Spring Township is a township in Butler County, Kansas, United States. As of the 2000 census, its population was 1,566.

== History ==
Spring Township was organized in 1871. It was named on account of its numerous springs.

== Geography ==
Spring Township covers an area of 36.27 square miles (93.9 km^{2}) and contains no incorporated settlements. According to the USGS, it contains two cemeteries: Butts-Wakefield and Garrison.

The stream of Turkey Creek runs through this township.
