= Fairview Township, Butler County, Kansas =

Fairview Township Butler County, Kansas
- Township
- Location within Butler County

- Location within Kansas
- Coordinates: 37°52′10″N 096°59′11″W
- Country: United States
- State: Kansas
- County: Butler

Area
  - Total: 35.74 sq mi (92.6 km^{2})
  - Land: 35.69 sq mi (92.4 km^{2})
  - Water: 0.05 sq mi (0.13 km^{2})
- Elevation: 1,375 ft (419 m)

Population (2000)
  - Total: 491
  - Density: 13.8/sq mi (5.31/km^{2})
- Time zone: UTC-6 (CST)
  - Summer (DST): UTC-5 (CDT)
- FIPS code: 20-22450
- GNIS ID: 474378
- Website: County website

Fairview Township is a township in Butler County, Kansas, United States. As of the 2000 census, its population was 491.

== History ==
Fairview Township was organized in 1873.

== Geography ==
Fairview Township covers an area of 35.74 square miles (92.6 km^{2}) and contains no incorporated settlements.

The stream of Rock Creek runs through this township.
