= Logan Township, Butler County, Kansas =

Logan Township Butler County, Kansas
- Township
- Location within Butler County

- Location within Kansas
- Coordinates: 37°35′30″N 096°46′16″W
- Country: United States
- State: Kansas
- County: Butler

Area
  - Total: 36.26 sq mi (93.91 km^{2})
  - Land: 36.20 sq mi (93.76 km^{2})
  - Water: 0.058 sq mi (0.15 km^{2}) 0.16%
- Elevation: 1,408 ft (429 m)

Population (2000)
  - Total: 154
  - Density: 4.25/sq mi (1.64/km^{2})
- Time zone: UTC-6 (CST)
  - Summer (DST): UTC-5 (CDT)
- FIPS code: 20-41775
- GNIS ID: 474836
- Website: County website

Logan Township is a township in Butler County, Kansas, United States. As of the 2000 census, its population was 154.

== History ==
Logan Township was organized in 1874.

== Geography ==
Logan Township covers an area of 36.26 square miles (93.9 km^{2}) and contains no incorporated settlements.

The streams of Eagle Creek and Plum Creek run through this township.
