= Douglass Township, Kansas =

Douglass Township Butler County, Kansas
- Township
- Location within Butler County

- Location within Kansas
- Coordinates: 37°31′44″N 096°58′16″W
- Country: United States
- State: Kansas
- County: Butler

Area
  - Total: 36.02 sq mi (93.29 km^{2})
  - Land: 35.90 sq mi (92.99 km^{2})
  - Water: 0.12 sq mi (0.3 km^{2}) 0.32%
- Elevation: 1,247 ft (380 m)

Population (2000)
  - Total: 2,306
  - Density: 64.23/sq mi (24.80/km^{2})
- Time zone: UTC-6 (CST)
  - Summer (DST): UTC-5 (CDT)
- FIPS code: 20-18425
- GNIS ID: 470019
- Website: County website

Douglass Township is a township in Butler County, Kansas, United States. As of the 2000 census, its population was 2,306.

== History ==
Douglass Township was organized in 1874. The township was named after Captain Joseph Douglass, a pioneer settler.

== Geography ==
Douglass Township covers an area of 36.02 square miles (93.3 km^{2}) and contains one incorporated settlement, Douglass. According to the USGS, it contains one cemetery, Douglass.

The stream of Little Walnut River runs through this township.
