= Rosalia Township, Kansas =

Rosalia Township Butler County, Kansas
- Township
- Location within Butler County

- Location within Kansas
- Coordinates: 37°46′52″N 096°42′31″W
- Country: United States
- State: Kansas
- County: Butler

Area
  - Total: 62.98 sq mi (163.12 km^{2})
  - Land: 62.62 sq mi (162.18 km^{2})
  - Water: 0.36 sq mi (0.94 km^{2}) 0.58%
- Elevation: 1,470 ft (450 m)

Population (2000)
  - Total: 631
  - Density: 10.1/sq mi (3.89/km^{2})
- Time zone: UTC-6 (CST)
  - Summer (DST): UTC-5 (CDT)
- FIPS code: 20-61125
- GNIS ID: 474612
- Website: County website

Rosalia Township is a township in Butler County, Kansas, United States. As of the 2010 census, its population was 631.

== History ==
Rosalia Township was created in 1871. The township was named after the town of Rosalia, which was named in honor of the wife of its first postmaster.

== Geography ==
Rosalia Township covers an area of 62.98 square miles (163.1 km^{2}) and contains no incorporated settlements. According to the USGS, it contains one cemetery.

The streams of De Haas Creek, Middle Branch Little Walnut River and Nicholas Creek run through this township.
