= Greenwich, Kansas =

Unincorporated community in Sedgwick County, Kansas

- Unincorporated community and CDP
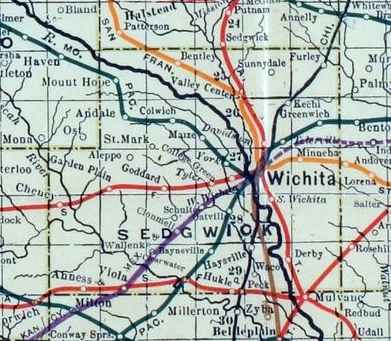
- 1915 railroad map of Sedgwick County

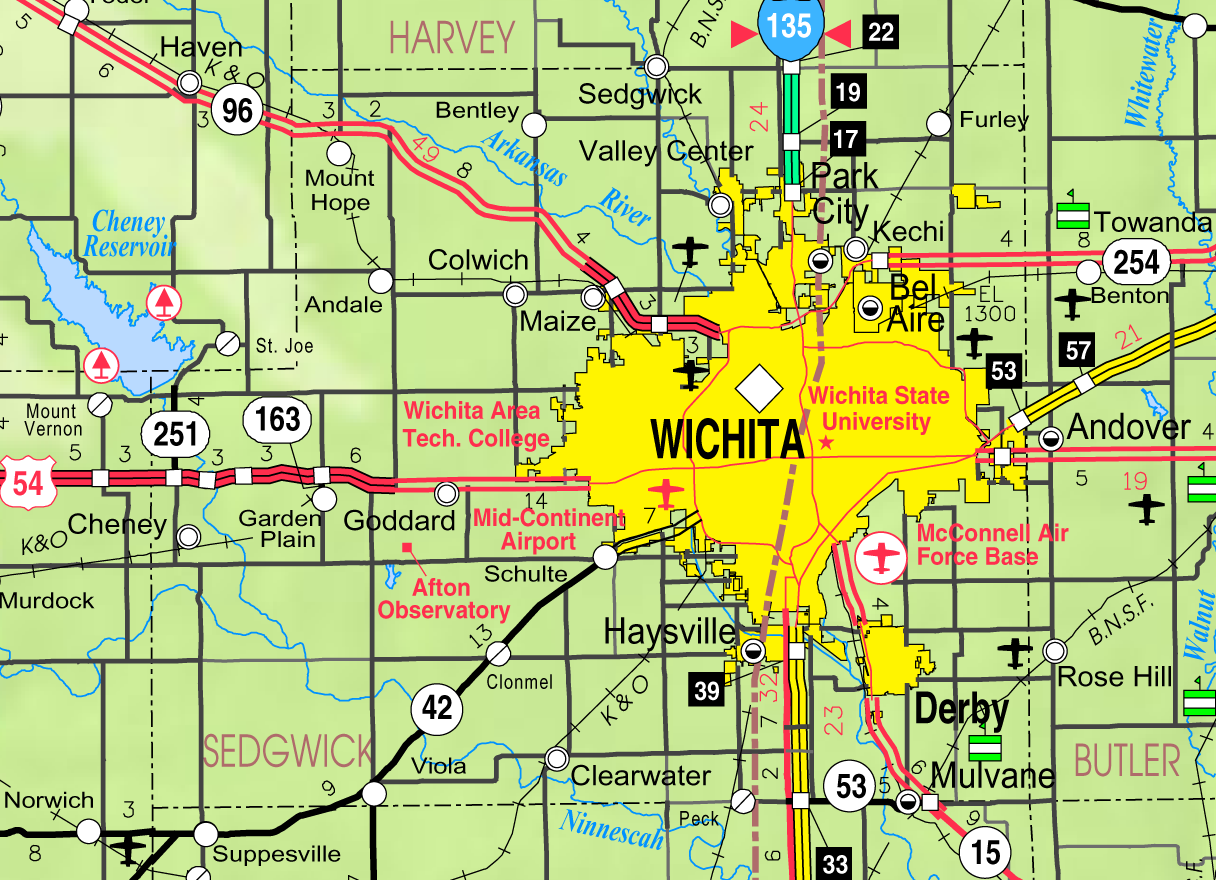
- KDOT map of Sedgwick County (legend)

- Location within Kansas Location within the United States
- Coordinates: 37°46′58″N 97°12′13″W
- Country: United States
- State: Kansas
- County: Sedgwick
- Elevation: 1,401 ft (427 m)

Population (2020)
  - Total: 64
- Time zone: UTC-6 (CST)
  - Summer (DST): UTC-5 (CDT)
- ZIP Code: 67055
- Area code: 316
- FIPS code: 20-28700
- GNIS ID: 473873

Greenwich (pronounced /ˈɡriːnwɪtʃ/) is an unincorporated community and census-designated place (CDP) in Sedgwick County, Kansas, United States. As of the 2020 census, the population was 64. It is located northeast of 53rd St North and Greenwich Rd.

== History ==
Greenwich had its start by the building of the St. Louis, Fort Scott & Wichita Railroad through that territory.

The first post office in Greenwich was established in September 1874.

== Geography ==
=== Climate ===
The climate in this area is characterized by hot, humid summers and generally mild to cool winters. According to the Köppen Climate Classification system, Greenwich has a humid subtropical climate, abbreviated "Cfa" on climate maps.

== Demographics ==
Historical population
Census	Pop.	Note	%±
2020	64		—
U.S. Decennial Census

The 2020 United States census counted 64 people, 31 households, and 15 families in Greenwich. The population density was 503.9 per square mile (194.6/km^{2}). There were 31 housing units at an average density of 244.1 per square mile (94.2/km^{2}). The racial makeup was 81.25% (52) white or European American (81.25% non-Hispanic white), 3.12% (2) black or African-American, 0.0% (0) Native American or Alaska Native, 0.0% (0) Asian, 0.0% (0) Pacific Islander or Native Hawaiian, 4.69% (3) from other races, and 10.94% (7) from two or more races. Hispanic or Latino of any race was 4.69% (3) of the population.

Of the 31 households, 22.6% had children under the age of 18; 41.9% were married couples living together; 38.7% had a female householder with no spouse or partner present. 48.4% of households consisted of individuals and 29.0% had someone living alone who was 65 years of age or older. The average household size was 2.1 and the average family size was 2.6. The percent of those with a bachelor's degree or higher was estimated to be 0.0% of the population.

20.3% of the population was under the age of 18, 15.6% from 18 to 24, 12.5% from 25 to 44, 34.4% from 45 to 64, and 17.2% who were 65 years of age or older. The median age was 45.5 years. For every 100 females, there were 45.5 males. For every 100 females ages 18 and older, there were 54.5 males.

== Education ==
The community is served by Circle USD 375 public school district.
