= Sedgwick County, Kansas =

County in Kansas, United States

- County
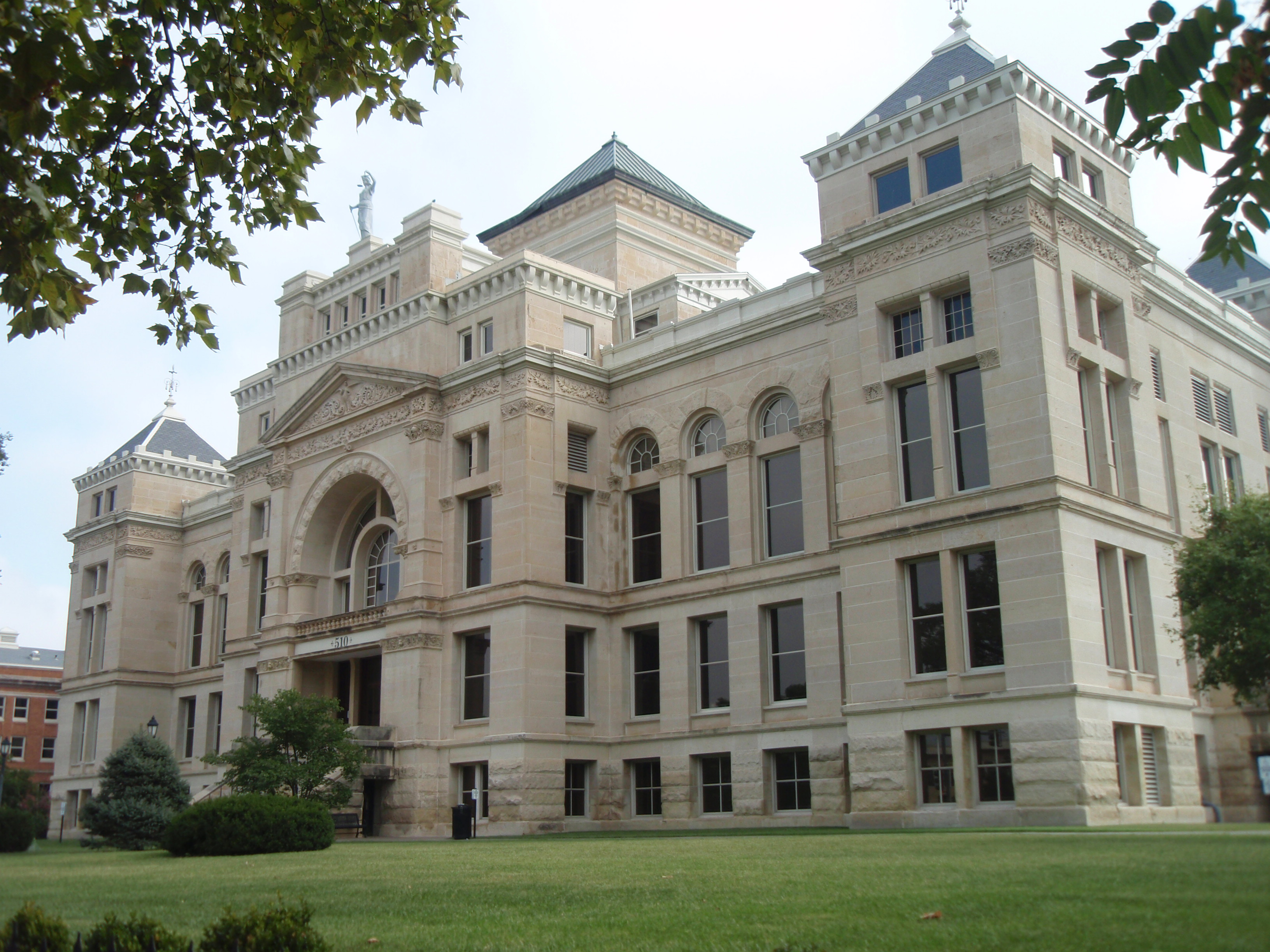
- Old Sedgwick County Courthouse in Wichita (2009)

- Location within the U.S. state of Kansas
- Coordinates: 37°43′N 97°27′W
- Country: United States
- State: Kansas
- Founded: February 26, 1867
- Named for: John Sedgwick
- Seat: Wichita
- Largest city: Wichita

Area
  - Total: 1,009 sq mi (2,610 km^{2})
  - Land: 998 sq mi (2,580 km^{2})
  - Water: 12 sq mi (31 km^{2}) 1.2%

Population (2020)
  - Total: 523,824
  - Estimate (2025): 538,433 ▲
  - Density: 524.9/sq mi (202.7/km^{2})
- Time zone: UTC−6 (Central)
  - Summer (DST): UTC−5 (CDT)
- Area code: 316
- Congressional district: 4th
- Website: sedgwickcounty.org

Sedgwick County is located in the U.S. state of Kansas. Its county seat is Wichita, the most populous city in the state. As of the 2020 census, the population was 523,824, making it the second-most populous county in Kansas. The county was named after John Sedgwick, the highest ranking Union general killed during the American Civil War.

== History ==
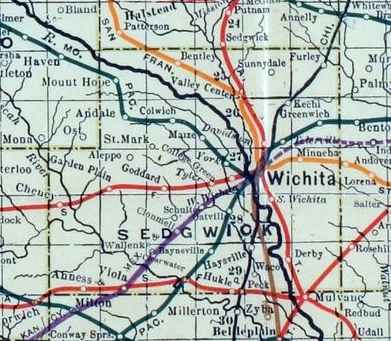
1915 railroad map of Sedgwick County

=== Early history ===
For many millennia, the Great Plains of North America was inhabited by nomadic Native Americans. From the 16th century to 18th century, the Kingdom of France claimed ownership of large parts of North America. In 1762, after the French and Indian War, France secretly ceded New France to Spain, per the Treaty of Fontainebleau. In 1802, Spain returned most of the land to France.

In 1803, most of the land for modern day Kansas was acquired by the United States from France as part of the 828,000 square mile Louisiana Purchase for 2.83 cents per acre. In 1848, after the Mexican–American War, the Treaty of Guadalupe Hidalgo with Spain brought into the United States all or part of land for ten future states, including southwest Kansas. In 1854, the Kansas Territory was organized, and in 1861 Kansas became the 34th U.S. state.

=== 19th century ===
Sedgwick County was founded in 1867, and named after John Sedgwick, who was a major general in the Union Army during the Civil War.

In 1887, the Chicago, Kansas and Nebraska Railway built a branch line north–south from Herington to Caldwell. This branch line connected Herington, Lost Springs, Lincolnville, Antelope, Marion, Aulne, Peabody, Elbing, Whitewater, Furley, Kechi, Wichita, Peck, Corbin, Wellington and Caldwell. By 1893, this branch line was incrementally built to Fort Worth, Texas. This line is called the "OKT". The Chicago, Kansas and Nebraska Railway was foreclosed in 1891 and was taken over by Chicago, Rock Island and Pacific Railway, which shut down in 1980 and reorganized as Oklahoma, Kansas and Texas Railroad, merged in 1988 with Missouri Pacific Railroad, and finally merged in 1997 with Union Pacific Railroad. Most locals still refer to this railroad as the "Rock Island".

=== 20th century ===
Sedgwick County was the setting for the murders committed by the BTK strangler from 1974 until 1991. Dennis Rader, an employee of the Sedgwick County city of Park City was arrested in early 2005 after he began sending incriminating letters taunting the police in 2004. He had not been heard from since 1979. Ken Landwehr of the Wichita Police Department led the task force which captured Rader, setting a new standard of serial crime detection in the process, which is still studied by police departments across the world. Rader is serving 10 life sentences at the El Dorado Correctional Facility in El Dorado.

== Geography ==
According to the United States Census Bureau, the county has a total area of 1,009 square miles (2,610 km^{2}), of which 998 square miles (2,580 km^{2}) is land and 12 square miles (31 km^{2}) (1.2%) is water.

=== Adjacent counties ===
- Harvey County (north)
- Butler County (east)
- Cowley County (southeast)
- Sumner County (south)
- Kingman County (west)
- Reno County (northwest)

== Demographics ==
Historical population
Census	Pop.	Note	%±
1870	1,095		—
1880	18,753		1,612.6%
1890	43,626		132.6%
1900	44,037		0.9%
1910	73,095		66.0%
1920	92,234		26.2%
1930	136,330		47.8%
1940	143,311		5.1%
1950	222,290		55.1%
1960	343,231		54.4%
1970	350,694		2.2%
1980	366,531		4.5%
1990	403,662		10.1%
2000	452,869		12.2%
2010	498,365		10.0%
2020	523,824		5.1%
2025 (est.)	538,433	▲	2.8%
U.S. Decennial Census; 1790-1960 1900–1990; 1990-2000 2010–2020

Sedgwick County is part of the Wichita, KS Metropolitan Statistical Area.

=== 2020 census ===
Sedgwick County, Kansas – Racial and ethnic composition Note: the US Census treats Hispanic/Latino as an ethnic category. This table excludes Latinos from the racial categories and assigns them to a separate category. Hispanics/Latinos may be of any race.
Race / Ethnicity (NH = Non-Hispanic)	Pop 1980	Pop 1990	Pop 2000	Pop 2010	Pop 2020	% 1980	% 1990	% 2000	% 2010	% 2020
White alone (NH)	314,661	337,788	345,925	348,434	336,271	85.85%	83.68%	76.39%	69.92%	64.20%
Black or African American alone (NH)	31,502	35,516	40,748	44,931	45,076	8.59%	8.80%	9.00%	9.02%	8.61%
Native American or Alaska Native alone (NH)	3,291	4,183	4,480	4,456	4,450	0.90%	1.04%	0.99%	0.89%	0.85%
Asian alone (NH)	4,393	8,513	15,021	20,167	22,205	1.20%	2.11%	3.32%	4.05%	4.24%
Native Hawaiian or Pacific Islander alone (NH)	x	x	229	378	513	x	x	0.05%	0.08%	0.10%
Other race alone (NH)	1,428	227	612	580	1,979	0.39%	0.06%	0.14%	0.12%	0.38%
Mixed race or Multiracial (NH)	x	x	9,457	14,783	30,700	x	x	2.09%	2.97%	5.86%
Hispanic or Latino (any race)	11,256	17,435	36,397	64,636	82,630	3.07%	4.32%	8.04%	12.97%	15.77%
Total	366,531	403,662	452,869	498,365	523,824	100.00%	100.00%	100.00%	100.00%	100.00%

=== 2020 census ===
As of the 2020 census, the county had a population of 523,824. The median age was 36.1 years. 25.0% of residents were under the age of 18 and 15.3% of residents were 65 years of age or older. For every 100 females there were 98.0 males, and for every 100 females age 18 and over there were 96.2 males age 18 and over.

The racial makeup of the county was 68.3% White, 8.9% Black or African American, 1.3% American Indian and Alaska Native, 4.3% Asian, 0.1% Native Hawaiian and Pacific Islander, 6.1% from some other race, and 11.0% from two or more races. Hispanic or Latino residents of any race comprised 15.8% of the population.

92.6% of residents lived in urban areas, while 7.4% lived in rural areas.

There were 205,247 households in the county, of which 31.2% had children under the age of 18 living with them and 27.0% had a female householder with no spouse or partner present. About 30.0% of all households were made up of individuals and 10.8% had someone living alone who was 65 years of age or older.

There were 223,640 housing units, of which 8.2% were vacant. Among occupied housing units, 61.6% were owner-occupied and 38.4% were renter-occupied. The homeowner vacancy rate was 1.5% and the rental vacancy rate was 10.7%.

=== 2000 census ===
As of the census of 2000, there were 452,869 people, 176,444 households, and 117,688 families residing in the county. The population density was 453 inhabitants per square mile (175/km^{2}). There were 191,133 housing units at an average density of 191 per square mile (74/km^{2}). The racial makeup of the county was 79.38% White, 9.13% Black or African American, 1.11% Native American, 3.34% Asian, 0.06% Pacific Islander, 4.17% from other races, and 2.81% from two or more races. 8.04% of the population were Hispanic or Latino of any race.

There were 176,444 households, out of which 34.40% had children under the age of 18 living with them, 51.70% were married couples living together, 10.90% had a female householder with no husband present, and 33.30% were non-families. 28.20% of all households were made up of individuals, and 8.70% had someone living alone who was 65 years of age or older. The average household size was 2.53 and the average family size was 3.14.

In the county, the population was spread out, with 28.20% under the age of 18, 9.50% from 18 to 24, 30.30% from 25 to 44, 20.60% from 45 to 64, and 11.40% who were 65 years of age or older. The median age was 34 years. For every 100 females, there were 97.80 males. For every 100 females age 18 and over, there were 95.20 males.

The median income for a household in the county was $42,485, and the median income for a family was $51,645. Males had a median income of $37,770 versus $26,153 for females. The per capita income for the county was $20,907. About 7.00% of families and 9.50% of the population were below the poverty line, including 11.90% of those under age 18 and 7.00% of those age 65 or over.

== Economy ==
Sedgwick County is the birthplace of famous restaurants such as White Castle and Pizza Hut. It is also the aviation headquarters of well-known Cessna and Learjet.

== Government ==
=== Elections ===
Presidential election results

United States presidential election results for Sedgwick County, Kansas
Year	Republican		Democratic		Third party(ies)	
Year	No.	%	No.	%	No.	%
1880	2,288	57.11%	1,354	33.80%	364	9.09%
1884	3,464	53.56%	2,467	38.14%	537	8.30%
1888	6,071	55.51%	4,025	36.80%	841	7.69%
1892	4,770	46.68%	0	0.00%	5,448	53.32%
1896	4,122	42.68%	5,434	56.26%	102	1.06%
1900	5,363	50.03%	5,144	47.99%	212	1.98%
1904	6,697	60.77%	2,869	26.03%	1,455	13.20%
1908	6,756	50.25%	6,049	44.99%	640	4.76%
1912	1,419	9.77%	5,752	39.61%	7,350	50.62%
1916	10,899	41.79%	13,391	51.34%	1,792	6.87%
1920	16,642	59.15%	10,998	39.09%	494	1.76%
1924	21,144	57.23%	8,712	23.58%	7,087	19.18%
1928	32,132	74.40%	10,649	24.66%	405	0.94%
1932	21,815	41.48%	29,344	55.79%	1,435	2.73%
1936	21,654	35.29%	39,503	64.39%	197	0.32%
1940	32,160	48.05%	34,219	51.13%	547	0.82%
1944	38,896	52.78%	34,442	46.73%	360	0.49%
1948	39,165	49.56%	38,621	48.87%	1,243	1.57%
1952	70,983	66.47%	34,926	32.71%	879	0.82%
1956	72,292	61.08%	45,732	38.64%	336	0.28%
1960	73,501	55.23%	58,887	44.25%	696	0.52%
1964	52,592	43.76%	66,372	55.23%	1,217	1.01%
1968	60,853	51.80%	44,041	37.49%	12,575	10.70%
1972	83,949	65.74%	39,220	30.71%	4,532	3.55%
1976	69,828	50.74%	63,989	46.49%	3,812	2.77%
1980	75,317	51.79%	55,105	37.89%	15,009	10.32%
1984	95,874	62.53%	55,263	36.05%	2,178	1.42%
1988	86,124	55.30%	65,618	42.13%	4,003	2.57%
1992	75,577	40.53%	62,670	33.61%	48,228	25.86%
1996	93,397	56.06%	59,643	35.80%	13,559	8.14%
2000	93,724	57.35%	62,561	38.28%	7,132	4.36%
2004	110,381	62.12%	64,839	36.49%	2,459	1.38%
2008	106,849	55.15%	82,337	42.50%	4,544	2.35%
2012	106,506	58.23%	71,977	39.35%	4,412	2.41%
2016	104,353	55.28%	69,627	36.88%	14,803	7.84%
2020	122,416	54.44%	95,870	42.64%	6,576	2.92%
2024	120,118	56.09%	90,506	42.26%	3,528	1.65%

Sedgwick County is fairly conservative for an urban county. It has only gone Democratic in a presidential election once since 1944. Democratic strength is concentrated in Wichita, while the suburban areas are strongly Republican. However, the county often backs Democrats for the governorship - for example Laura Kelly in 2022 and Cindy Holscher in 2026. This makes it a bellwether in local Kansas elections, with the statewide winner almost always winning the county. Until 2026, the last Democratic Senate candidate to win the county was Bill Roy in 1974, while Kansas as a whole had not been represented by a Democrat in the Senate since 1938. In the U.S. House of Representatives, Sedgwick County is represented by Republican Ron Estes. He won the county with a 20.6% margin in 2024. Sedgewick County continued its bellweather status in the 2026 US senate election in Kansas, where it backed the winner of the state, Democrat Adam Hamilton, thus continuing its tendency to back the statewide winner.

=== Laws ===
Sedgwick County was a prohibition, or "dry", county until the Kansas Constitution was amended in 1986 and voters approved the sale of alcoholic liquor by the individual drink with a 30 percent food sales requirement. The food sales requirement was removed with voter approval in 1988.

Despite its conservative reputation, Sedgwick County voted "No" on the 2022 Kansas abortion referendum, an anti-abortion ballot measure, by 58% to 42%.

== Transportation ==
=== Major highways ===
- I-35 / Kansas Turnpike
- I-135
- I-235
- US-81
- US-54 / US-400
- K-15
- K-42
- K-49
- K-96
- K-251
- K-254

=== Public transportation ===
- Wichita Transit

=== Airports ===
The following public-use airports are located in Sedgwick County:

- Wichita Dwight D. Eisenhower National Airport (ICT)
- Beech Factory Airport (BEC)
- Cessna Aircraft Field (CEA)
- Colonel James Jabara Airport (AAO)
- Cook Airfield (K50)
- Maize Airport (70K)
- Westport Airport (71K)
- Westport Auxiliary Airport (72K)

The following are closed airports:

- Riverside Airport (K32)

== Education ==
=== Colleges and universities ===
- Friends University
- Kansas College of Osteopathic Medicine
- Newman University
- University of Kansas School of Medicine
- WSU Tech
- Wichita State University

=== Unified school districts ===
School districts include:

- Andover USD 385
- Burrton USD 369
- Cheney USD 268
- Circle USD 375
- Clearwater USD 264
- Conway Springs USD 356
- Derby USD 260
- Goddard USD 265
- Halstead–Bentley USD 440
- Haven USD 312
- Haysville USD 261
- Kingman-Norwich USD 331
- Maize USD 266
- Mulvane USD 263
- Remington USD 206
- Renwick USD 267
- Rose Hill USD 394
- Sedgwick USD 439
- Valley Center USD 262
- Wichita USD 259

=== Libraries ===
Libraries were a priority for the early settlers of Wichita. In 1873, the Wichita Library Association was granted with the "purpose of establishing and maintaining a public library and reading room and for the diffusion of knowledge and the promotion of intellectual improvement in the city of Wichita, Sedgwick County, Kansas." Despite a plan set forth, this library and the following attempt at establishing one in 1874 never came to pass. Shortly later, another library association was formed by the same name of Wichita Library Association with a required membership fee of three dollars. Women in the community organized events to raise funds. However, this library struggled as well and stopped functioning in 1885. It wasn't until the city hall was built that the development of a library began to take shape.

"In making their plans for housing the books, the board, then located in the Sedgwick block, petitioned and obtained permission from the city council to occupy rooms on the first floor of the city hall," and so it was this decision that proved successful in paving the way for future libraries in Wichita.

It was at this time that philanthropist, Andrew Carnegie, was providing funds for libraries in many states to be built. In fact, Andrew Carnegie funded fifty-eight libraries in Kansas. So, it is not surprising that in 1911, the city clerk wrote Andrew Carnegie for donations for a public library, which led to an offer of $75,000 for a building. The Wichita Carnegie Library building opened to the public on May 14, 1915, and under the administration of Mr. Julius Lucht "the library was organized into its present departmental state, with a greatly augmented budget, staff and book collection.". The Wichita Carnegie Library was the main library for the city until 1967."

Today, Sedgwick County has seven Wichita Public Libraries: Advanced Learning Library, Alford Branch, Angelou N.E. Branch, Evergreen Branch, Rockwell Branch, Walters Branch, and Westlink Branch.

Other public libraries in the county include: Andale District Library, Cheney Public Library, Clearwater Public Library, Derby Public Library, Garden Plain Community Library, Goddard Public Library, Haysville Community Library, McConnell Base Library, Mount Hope Public Library, Mulvane Public Library, Park City Public Library, Valley Center Public Library, Viola Township Library.

== Points of interest ==
- Sedgwick County Extension Arboretum
- Sedgwick County Zoo
- Sedgwick County Fair
- Wichita-Sedgwick County Historical Museum
- INTRUST Bank Arena

== Communities ==
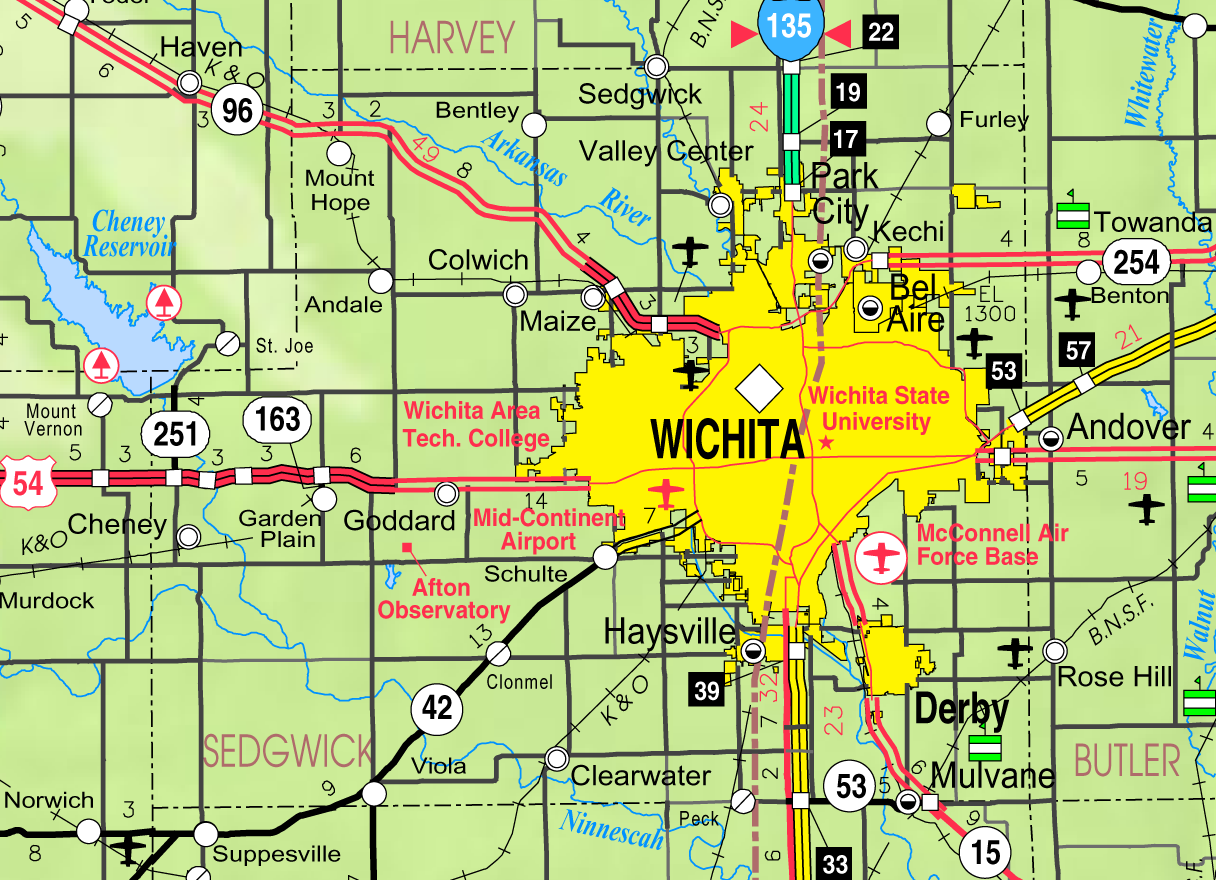
2005 map of Sedgwick County (map legend)

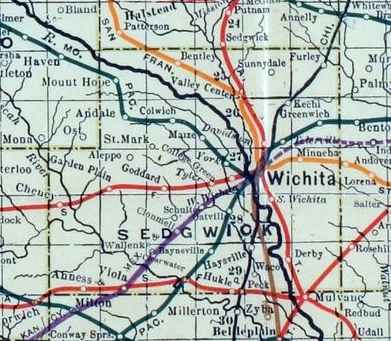
1915-1918 railroad map of Sedgwick County

List of townships / incorporated cities / unincorporated communities / extinct former communities within Sedgwick County.

=== Cities ===
‡ means a community has portions in an adjacent county.

- Andale
- Bel Aire
- Bentley
- Cheney
- Clearwater
- Colwich
- Derby
- Eastborough
- Garden Plain
- Goddard
- Haysville
- Kechi
- Maize
- Mount Hope
- Mulvane‡
- Park City
- Sedgwick‡
- Valley Center
- Viola
- Wichita (county seat)

=== Unincorporated communities ===
† means a community is designated a Census-Designated Place (CDP) by the United States Census Bureau.

- Anness
- Aleppo (located at "W 13th St N" and "N 263rd St W")
- Bayneville
- Clonmel
- Furley†
- Greenwich†
- McConnell AFB†
- Oaklawn-Sunview†
- Peck†‡
- Schulte
- St. Marks† (located along "W 29th St N")
- Sunnydale
- Trails View (previously named Spasticville)
- Waco

=== Ghost towns ===
- Davidson
- Hatfield
- Huckle
- Jamesburg
- Marshall
- Oatville
- Wichita Heights

=== Townships ===
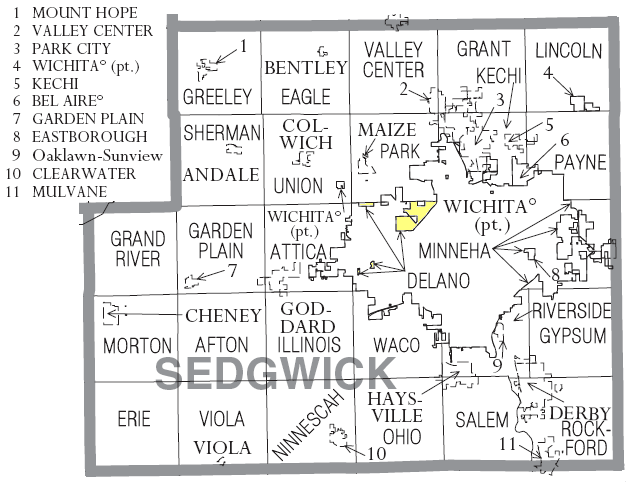
Map of townships in Sedgwick County

Sedgwick County is divided into twenty-seven townships. The cities of Bel Aire and Wichita are considered governmentally independent and are excluded from the census figures for the townships. In the following table, the population center is the largest city (or cities) included in that township's population total, if it is of a significant size. The county used to have one more township, Wichita Township, but it no longer exists.

Sources: 2000 U.S. Gazetteer from the U.S. Census Bureau.
Township	FIPS	Population center	Population	Population density /km^{2} (/sq mi)	Land area km^{2} (sq mi)	Water area km^{2} (sq mi)	Water %	Geographic coordinates
Afton	00425		1,290	14 (37)	91 (35)	2 (1)	1.73%	37°36′10″N 97°37′54″W
Attica	03125	Goddard	4,959	62 (161)	80 (31)	0 (0)	0.23%	37°40′44″N 97°32′16″W
Delano	17375		196	25 (64)	8 (3)	1 (0)	13.81%	37°43′2″N 97°25′13″W
Eagle	19250	Bentley	1,069	12 (30)	92 (36)	1 (1)	1.44%	37°51′48″N 97°32′26″W
Erie	21550		106	1 (3)	94 (36)	0 (0)	0.03%	37°31′24″N 97°44′51″W
Garden Plain	25400	Garden Plain	1,780	19 (50)	92 (36)	0 (0)	0.15%	37°40′25″N 97°39′47″W
Grand River	27300		607	7 (17)	91 (35)	2 (1)	2.20%	37°40′6″N 97°45′14″W
Grant	28125	Valley Center (part)	3,710	40 (104)	93 (36)	0 (0)	0.47%	37°50′55″N 97°20′23″W
Greeley	28400	Mount Hope	1,094	12 (31)	93 (36)	1 (1)	1.43%	37°52′21″N 97°39′17″W
Gypsum	29300		5,822	64 (164)	92 (35)	0 (0)	0.51%	37°36′26″N 97°12′34″W
Illinois	33775		1,620	18 (45)	93 (36)	0 (0)	0.12%	37°35′54″N 97°31′53″W
Kechi	36250	Park City	8,041	143 (370)	56 (22)	0 (0)	0.23%	37°47′35″N 97°19′14″W
Lincoln	41150		473	5 (13)	91 (35)	0 (0)	0.12%	37°52′35″N 97°11′53″W
Minneha	47125	Eastborough	5,084	117 (304)	43 (17)	1 (0)	1.49%	37°41′11″N 97°11′25″W
Morton	48550	Cheney	2,380	26 (67)	91 (35)	1 (0)	1.14%	37°37′24″N 97°46′33″W
Ninnescah	50725	Clearwater	2,913	31 (81)	93 (36)	0 (0)	0.47%	37°30′51″N 97°31′28″W
Ohio	52450		1,146	12 (32)	94 (36)	0 (0)	0.14%	37°31′56″N 97°25′21″W
Park	54425	Maize	4,128	51 (131)	82 (32)	2 (1)	2.04%	37°46′26″N 97°26′13″W
Payne	55075		1,119	14 (36)	80 (31)	0 (0)	0.21%	37°46′58″N 97°12′22″W
Riverside	60125	Haysville (part); Derby (part); Oaklawn-Sunview CDP	15,694	333 (862)	47 (18)	1 (0)	1.98%	37°34′56″N 97°18′22″W
Rockford	60675	Derby (part)	20,019	198 (514)	101 (39)	1 (0)	0.99%	37°31′55″N 97°14′47″W
Salem	62675	Haysville (part)	8,411	102 (263)	83 (32)	1 (0)	0.95%	37°32′23″N 97°20′11″W
Sherman	65100	Andale	1,362	14 (37)	96 (37)	0 (0)	0.22%	37°47′23″N 97°38′4″W
Union	72375	Colwich	2,156	23 (60)	93 (36)	0 (0)	0.23%	37°46′55″N 97°32′8″W
Valley Center	73275	Valley Center (part)	3,642	39 (100)	94 (36)	0 (0)	0.16%	37°51′22″N 97°24′10″W
Viola	74050	Viola	547	6 (15)	93 (36)	1 (0)	0.98%	37°30′41″N 97°39′3″W
Waco	74300		3,381	45 (117)	75 (29)	0 (0)	0.12%	37°36′35″N 97°24′57″W

== See also ==
- National Register of Historic Places listings in Sedgwick County, Kansas
- Chisholm Trail
