= Butler County, Kansas =

County in Kansas, United States

- County
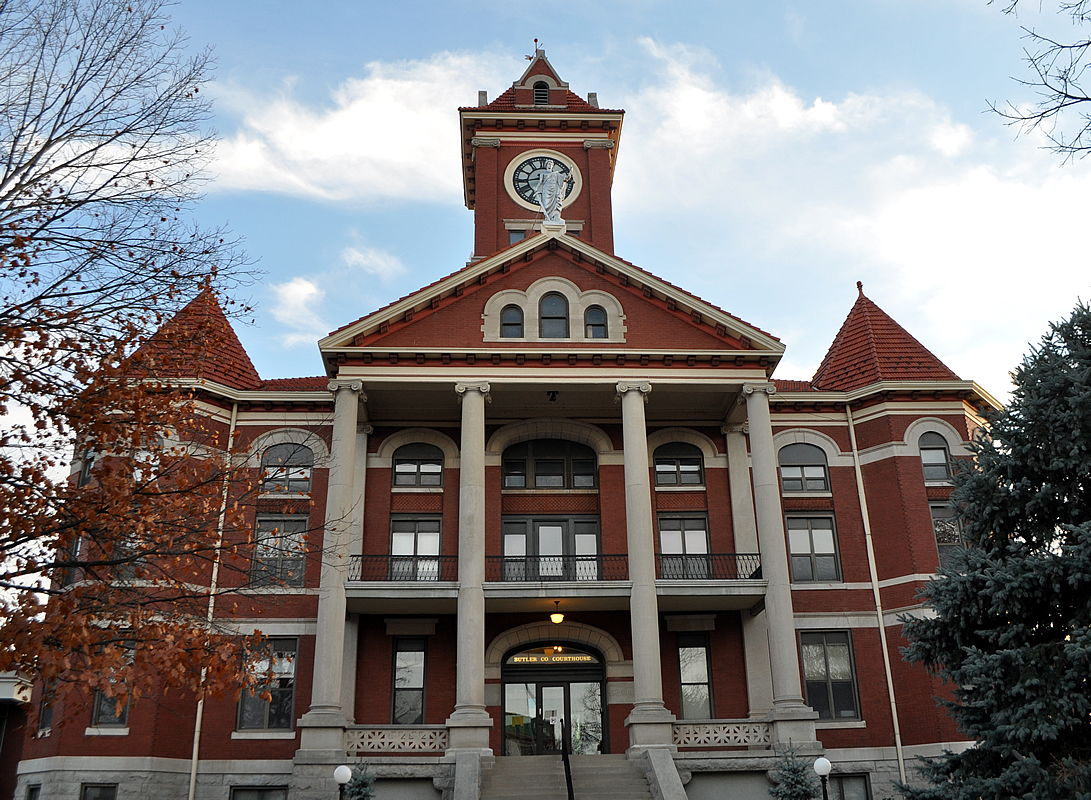
- Butler County Courthouse in El Dorado (2011)

- Location within the U.S. state of Kansas
- Country: United States
- State: Kansas
- Founded: August 25, 1855
- Named for: Andrew Pickens Butler
- Seat: El Dorado
- Largest city: Andover

Area
  - Total: 1,447 sq mi (3,750 km^{2})
  - Land: 1,430 sq mi (3,700 km^{2})
  - Water: 17 sq mi (44 km^{2}) 1.2%

Population (2020)
  - Total: 67,380
  - Estimate (2025): 69,484 ▲
  - Density: 47.1/sq mi (18.2/km^{2})
- Time zone: UTC−6 (Central)
  - Summer (DST): UTC−5 (CDT)
- Area code: 316
- Congressional district: 4th
- Website: www.bucoks.gov

Butler County is a county in the U.S. state of Kansas and is the largest county in the state by total area. Its county seat is El Dorado and its most populous city is Andover. As of the 2020 census, the county population was 67,380. The county was named for Andrew Butler, a U.S. Senator from South Carolina who coauthored the Kansas–Nebraska Act. As of 2025, it is the eighth-most populated county in Kansas.

== History ==
=== Early history ===
For many millennia, the Great Plains of North America was inhabited by nomadic Native Americans. From the 16th century to 18th century, the Kingdom of France claimed ownership of large parts of North America. In 1762, after the French and Indian War, France secretly ceded New France to Spain, per the Treaty of Fontainebleau. In 1802, Spain returned most of the land to France, but keeping title to about 7,500 square miles.

In 1803, most of the land for modern day Kansas was acquired by the United States from France as part of the 828,000 square mile Louisiana Purchase for 2.83 cents per acre. In 1848, after the Mexican–American War, the Treaty of Guadalupe Hidalgo with Spain brought into the United States all or part of land for ten future states, including southwest Kansas. In 1854, the Kansas Territory was organized, then in 1861 Kansas became the 34th U.S. state.

=== 19th century ===
In 1855, Butler County was founded. It was named in honor of a U.S. senator from South Carolina, Andrew Butler (1796-1857), who was one of the authors of the Kansas-Nebraska Act of 1854 and a strong advocate of Kansas becoming a slave state.

In 1877, the Florence, El Dorado, and Walnut Valley Railroad Company built a branch line from Florence to El Dorado, in 1881 it was extended to Douglass, and later to Arkansas City. The line was leased and operated by the Atchison, Topeka and Santa Fe Railway. The line from Florence to El Dorado was abandoned in 1942. The original branch line connected Florence, Burns, De Graff, El Dorado, Augusta, Douglass, Rock, Akron, Winfield, Arkansas City.

In 1887, the Chicago, Kansas and Nebraska Railway built a branch line north–south from Herington to Caldwell. This branch line connected Herington, Lost Springs, Lincolnville, Antelope, Marion, Aulne, Peabody, Elbing, Whitewater, Furley, Kechi, Wichita, Peck, Corbin, Wellington, Caldwell. By 1893, this branch line was incrementally built to Fort Worth, Texas. This line is called the "OKT". The Chicago, Kansas and Nebraska Railway was foreclosed in 1891 and was taken over by Chicago, Rock Island and Pacific Railway, which shut down in 1980 and reorganized as Oklahoma, Kansas and Texas Railroad, merged in 1988 with Missouri Pacific Railroad, and finally merged in 1997 with Union Pacific Railroad. Most locals still refer to this railroad as the "Rock Island".

=== 21st century ===
In 2010, the Keystone-Cushing Pipeline (Phase II) was constructed north to south through Butler County (near Potwin, Towanda, Augusta, Douglass), with much controversy over tax exemption and environmental concerns (if a leak ever occurs). A pumping station named Burns was built two miles north of Potwin, and new power lines were built from a high-voltage line 0.3 mile east of De Graff.

In an unusual technical glitch, a farmstead approximately four miles northeast of Potwin became the default site of 600 million IP addresses (due to their lack of fine granularity) when the Massachusetts-based digital mapping company MaxMind changed the putative geographic center of the contiguous United States from 39.8333333,-98.585522 to 38.0000,-97.0000.

== Geography ==
According to the United States Census Bureau, the county has an area of 1,447 square miles (3,750 km^{2}), of which 1,430 square miles (3,700 km^{2}) is land and 17 square miles (44 km^{2}) (1.2%) is water. It is the largest county by area in Kansas.

=== Adjacent counties ===
- Chase County (northeast)
- Greenwood County (east)
- Elk County (southeast)
- Cowley County (south)
- Sumner County (southwest)
- Harvey County (west)
- Sedgwick County (west)
- Marion County (northwest)

=== Major highways ===
Sources: National Atlas, U.S. Census Bureau

- I-35
- US-54
- US-77
- K-96
- K-177
- K-196
- K-254

== Demographics ==
Historical population
Census	Pop.	Note	%±
1860	437		—
1870	3,035		594.5%
1880	18,586		512.4%
1890	24,055		29.4%
1900	23,363		−2.9%
1910	23,059		−1.3%
1920	43,842		90.1%
1930	35,904		−18.1%
1940	32,013		−10.8%
1950	31,001		−3.2%
1960	38,395		23.9%
1970	38,658		0.7%
1980	44,782		15.8%
1990	50,580		12.9%
2000	59,482		17.6%
2010	65,880		10.8%
2020	67,380		2.3%
2025 (est.)	69,484	▲	3.1%
U.S. Decennial Census; 1790-1960 1900-1990; 1990-2000 2010-2020

Butler County is part of the Wichita metropolitan area.

=== Racial and ethnic composition ===
Butler County, Kansas – Racial and ethnic composition Note: the US Census treats Hispanic/Latino as an ethnic category. This table excludes Latinos from the racial categories and assigns them to a separate category. Hispanics/Latinos may be of any race.
Race / Ethnicity (NH = Non-Hispanic)	Pop 1980	Pop 1990	Pop 2000	Pop 2010	Pop 2020	% 1980	% 1990	% 2000	% 2010	% 2020
White alone (NH)	43,554	48,861	55,655	59,920	56,846	97.26%	96.60%	93.57%	90.95%	84.37%
Black or African American alone (NH)	269	361	810	1,054	1,398	0.60%	0.71%	1.36%	1.60%	2.07%
Native American or Alaska Native alone (NH)	246	449	509	586	489	0.55%	0.89%	0.86%	0.89%	0.73%
Asian alone (NH)	107	161	236	452	996	0.24%	0.32%	0.40%	0.69%	1.48%
Native Hawaiian or Pacific Islander alone (NH)	x	x	19	31	37	x	x	0.03%	0.05%	0.05%
Other race alone (NH)	48	6	32	48	222	0.11%	0.01%	0.05%	0.07%	0.33%
Mixed race or Multiracial (NH)	x	x	885	1,187	3,814	x	x	1.49%	1.80%	5.66%
Hispanic or Latino (any race)	558	742	1,336	2,602	3,578	1.25%	1.47%	2.25%	3.95%	5.31%
Total	44,782	50,580	59,482	65,880	67,380	100.00%	100.00%	100.00%	100.00%	100.00%

=== 2020 census ===
As of the 2020 census, the county had a population of 67,380. The median age was 38.3 years. 25.7% of residents were under the age of 18 and 16.3% of residents were 65 years of age or older. For every 100 females there were 103.2 males, and for every 100 females age 18 and over there were 102.3 males age 18 and over. 53.9% of residents lived in urban areas, while 46.1% lived in rural areas.

The racial makeup of the county was 86.3% White, 2.2% Black or African American, 0.8% American Indian and Alaska Native, 1.5% Asian, 0.1% Native Hawaiian and Pacific Islander, 1.4% from some other race, and 7.8% from two or more races. Hispanic or Latino residents of any race comprised 5.3% of the population.

There were 24,660 households in the county, of which 34.7% had children under the age of 18 living with them and 21.6% had a female householder with no spouse or partner present. About 23.7% of all households were made up of individuals and 10.9% had someone living alone who was 65 years of age or older.

There were 26,901 housing units, of which 8.3% were vacant. Among occupied housing units, 74.4% were owner-occupied and 25.6% were renter-occupied. The homeowner vacancy rate was 1.5% and the rental vacancy rate was 10.2%.

=== 2000 census ===
As of the census of 2000, 59,482 people, 21,527 households, and 16,059 families resided in the county. The population density was 42 inhabitants per square mile (16/km^{2}). There were 23,176 housing units at an average density of 16 per square mile (6.2/km^{2}). The county's racial makeup was 94.94% White, 1.38% Black or African American, 0.91% Native American, 0.40% Asian, 0.03% Pacific Islander, 0.66% from other races, and 1.69% two or more races. Hispanic or Latino of any race were 2.25% of the population.

There were 21,527 households, of which 37.90% had children under the age of 18 living with them, 62.60% were married couples living together, 8.30% had a female householder with no husband present, and 25.40% were non-families. 21.90% of all households were made up of individuals, and 9.40% had someone living alone who was 65 years of age or older. The average household size was 2.67 and the average family size was 3.13.

In the county, the population was spread out, with 28.60% under the age of 18, 8.30% from 18 to 24, 28.80% from 25 to 44, 21.70% from 45 to 64, and 12.60% who were 65 years of age or older. The median age was 36 years. For every 100 females, there were 100.90 males. For every 100 females age 18 and over, there were 98.80 males.

The county's median household income was $45,474, and the median family income was $53,632. Males had a median income of $38,675 versus $26,109 for females. The county's per capita income was $20,150. About 5.40% of families and 7.30% of the population were below the poverty line, including 9.00% of those under age 18 and 6.40% of those age 65 or over.

== Government ==
=== Presidential elections ===
Presidential election results

United States presidential election results for Butler County, Kansas
Year	Republican		Democratic		Third party(ies)	
Year	No.	%	No.	%	No.	%
1888	3,172	55.36%	1,616	28.20%	942	16.44%
1892	2,650	48.62%	0	0.00%	2,800	51.38%
1896	2,414	44.91%	2,926	54.44%	35	0.65%
1900	2,947	50.64%	2,752	47.29%	120	2.06%
1904	3,306	61.90%	1,540	28.83%	495	9.27%
1908	3,049	53.97%	2,290	40.54%	310	5.49%
1912	971	18.30%	2,005	37.79%	2,330	43.91%
1916	3,614	43.16%	4,248	50.73%	511	6.10%
1920	6,821	60.56%	4,112	36.51%	331	2.94%
1924	7,367	57.93%	3,642	28.64%	1,707	13.42%
1928	10,168	79.43%	2,533	19.79%	101	0.79%
1932	6,116	43.70%	7,447	53.22%	431	3.08%
1936	6,204	39.99%	9,283	59.84%	27	0.17%
1940	7,619	49.60%	7,615	49.58%	126	0.82%
1944	7,064	53.50%	6,084	46.08%	55	0.42%
1948	6,551	50.58%	6,269	48.40%	132	1.02%
1952	10,179	65.04%	5,359	34.24%	113	0.72%
1956	9,591	60.73%	6,158	38.99%	45	0.28%
1960	10,059	58.37%	7,112	41.27%	61	0.35%
1964	6,364	40.97%	9,061	58.34%	107	0.69%
1968	7,893	50.79%	5,952	38.30%	1,696	10.91%
1972	11,045	67.39%	4,669	28.49%	675	4.12%
1976	8,390	48.45%	8,540	49.32%	386	2.23%
1980	10,210	55.33%	6,875	37.26%	1,368	7.41%
1984	12,976	66.33%	6,371	32.56%	217	1.11%
1988	10,976	57.60%	7,690	40.35%	390	2.05%
1992	9,166	38.79%	7,029	29.75%	7,434	31.46%
1996	13,979	58.70%	7,294	30.63%	2,543	10.68%
2000	13,377	63.69%	6,755	32.16%	870	4.14%
2004	18,438	70.16%	7,495	28.52%	347	1.32%
2008	18,155	65.13%	9,159	32.86%	559	2.01%
2012	18,157	69.61%	7,282	27.92%	646	2.48%
2016	19,073	68.96%	6,573	23.77%	2,011	7.27%
2020	22,634	69.60%	9,181	28.23%	705	2.17%
2024	22,426	69.57%	9,150	28.38%	660	2.05%

Like of most of Kansas’ counties, Butler County is solidly Republican. In 2008, John McCain carried the county by a nearly two-to-one margin over Barack Obama. Since 1992, no Democratic candidate has received so much as forty percent of the county's vote. The last Democratic candidate to carry the county was Jimmy Carter in 1976.

=== Laws ===
Butler County was a prohibition, or "dry", county until the Kansas Constitution was amended in 1986 and voters approved the sale of alcoholic liquor by the individual drink with a 30% food sales requirement.

== Education ==
=== College ===
- Butler County Community College in El Dorado

=== Unified school districts ===
School districts include:

- Bluestem USD 205
- Remington USD 206
- Circle USD 375
- Andover USD 385
- Rose Hill USD 394
- Douglass USD 396
- Augusta USD 402
- El Dorado USD 490
- Flinthills USD 492

School districts with offices in neighboring counties

- Peabody–Burns USD 398
- Central USD 462
- Eureka USD 389

=== Private schools ===
- Berean Academy in Elbing

== Communities ==
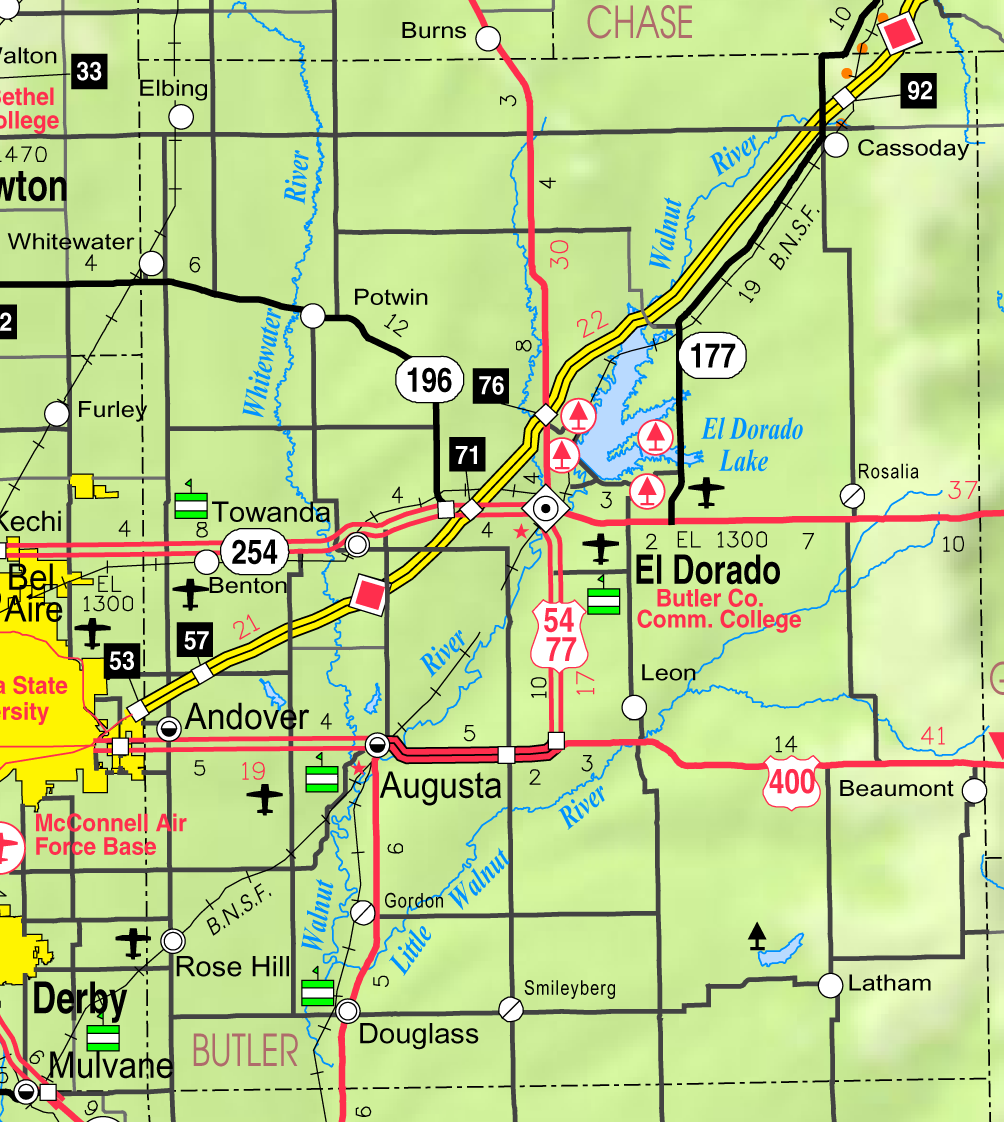
2005 map of Butler County (map legend)

List of townships / incorporated cities / unincorporated communities / extinct former communities within Butler County.

=== Cities ===
- Andover
- Augusta
- Benton
- Cassoday
- Douglass
- Elbing
- El Dorado (county seat)
- Latham
- Leon
- Potwin
- Rose Hill
- Towanda
- Whitewater

=== Unincorporated communities ===
† means a community is designated a Census-Designated Place (CDP) by the United States Census Bureau.

- Beaumont†
- Bois d'Arc
- Brainerd
- De Graff
- Gordon
- Haverhill
- Keighley
- Lorena
- Midian
- Pontiac
- Rosalia†

=== Ghost towns ===
- Aikman
- Alki
- Amador
- Browntown
- Chelsea (now under El Dorado Lake)
- Dixon
- Durachen
- Edgecomb
- Frazier
- Indianola
- Little Walnut
- Magna City
- Oil Hill
- Nellans
- Numa
- Oil Valley
- Ophir
- Palmyra
- Pine Grove
- Plum Grove
- Providence
- Quito
- Ramsey
- Salter
- Sycamore Springs
- Vanora
- Wingate

=== Townships ===
Butler County is divided into twenty-nine townships. The cities of Augusta and El Dorado are considered governmentally independent and are excluded from the census figures for the townships. In the following table, the population center is the largest city (or cities) included in that township's population total, if it is of a significant size.

Township	FIPS	Population center	Population	Population density /km^{2} (/sq mi)	Land area km^{2} (sq mi)	Water area km^{2} (sq mi)	Water %	Geographic coordinates
Augusta	03325		1,405	17 (43)	84 (32)	1 (0)	0.68%	37°41′32″N 96°59′15″W
Benton	06200	Benton	2,211	24 (61)	93 (36)	0 (0)	0%	37°47′0″N 97°6′11″W
Bloomington	07500		544	6 (15)	93 (36)	0 (0)	0%	37°35′57″N 96°54′1″W
Bruno	08825	Andover	9,744	107 (278)	91 (35)	0 (0)	0.10%	37°41′37″N 97°6′48″W
Chelsea	12750		190	1 (2)	261 (101)	17 (7)	6.15%	37°55′27″N 96°44′34″W
Clay	13575		83	1 (2)	94 (36)	0 (0)	0.22%	37°31′21″N 96°45′39″W
Clifford	14175		259	2 (6)	108 (42)	0 (0)	0.18%	38°2′7″N 96°58′41″W
Douglass	18425	Douglass	2,306	25 (64)	93 (36)	0 (0)	0.32%	37°31′1″N 97°0′33″W
El Dorado	20100		1,700	12 (32)	140 (54)	2 (1)	1.46%	37°48′38″N 96°52′23″W
Fairmount	22275	Elbing	511	5 (14)	94 (36)	0 (0)	0.14%	38°2′34″N 97°5′53″W
Fairview	22450		491	5 (14)	92 (36)	0 (0)	0.14%	37°52′15″N 96°59′46″W
Glencoe	26400		239	1 (4)	161 (62)	1 (0)	0.60%	37°41′29″N 96°36′57″W
Hickory	31750		90	1 (1)	162 (62)	1 (0)	0.67%	37°37′5″N 96°37′45″W
Lincoln	40500		317	1 (3)	257 (99)	2 (1)	0.64%	37°57′6″N 96°53′1″W
Little Walnut	41625	Leon	1,002	11 (28)	94 (36)	0 (0)	0.44%	37°41′34″N 96°46′37″W
Logan	41775		154	2 (4)	94 (36)	0 (0)	0.16%	37°37′15″N 96°45′13″W
Milton	46875	Whitewater	1,136	12 (31)	94 (36)	0 (0)	0.15%	37°57′21″N 97°7′14″W
Murdock	49225		378	4 (10)	93 (36)	0 (0)	0%	37°51′42″N 97°6′23″W
Pleasant	56200	Rose Hill (part)	4,649	50 (129)	93 (36)	0 (0)	0.11%	37°35′49″N 97°6′54″W
Plum Grove	56850	Potwin	661	7 (19)	92 (36)	1 (0)	0.58%	37°56′46″N 97°0′51″W
Prospect	57775		2,033	10 (26)	203 (78)	16 (6)	7.20%	37°49′25″N 96°45′35″W
Richland	59250	Rose Hill (part)	2,399	26 (66)	94 (36)	0 (0)	0.02%	37°31′37″N 97°6′29″W
Rock Creek	60475		299	3 (8)	94 (36)	0 (0)	0%	37°31′19″N 96°53′3″W
Rosalia	61125		589	4 (9)	162 (63)	1 (0)	0.58%	37°46′47″N 96°37′22″W
Spring	67275		1,566	17 (43)	94 (36)	0 (0)	0.13%	37°41′36″N 96°52′52″W
Sycamore	69700	Cassoday	333	1 (3)	295 (114)	2 (1)	0.76%	38°1′15″N 96°40′19″W
Towanda	71150	Towanda	2,727	29 (76)	93 (36)	0 (0)	0.14%	37°47′32″N 96°59′43″W
Union	72050	Latham	226	1 (4)	161 (62)	1 (0)	0.72%	37°32′2″N 96°38′41″W
Walnut	74900		760	8 (21)	92 (36)	1 (0)	0.77%	37°36′4″N 96°59′31″W
Sources: "Census 2000 U.S. Gazetteer Files". U.S. Census Bureau, Geography Division. Archived from the original on August 2, 2002.

== See also ==
- National Register of Historic Places listings in Butler County, Kansas

Community information for Kansas

- Kansas locations by per capita income
- List of counties in Kansas
- List of townships in Kansas
- List of cities in Kansas
- List of unincorporated communities in Kansas
- List of ghost towns in Kansas
