= Walnut Township, Butler County, Kansas =

Walnut Township Butler County, Kansas
- Township
- Location within Butler County

- Location within Kansas
- Coordinates: 37°36′10″N 96°59′26″W
- Country: United States
- State: Kansas
- County: Butler

Area
  - Total: 35.88 sq mi (92.92 km^{2})
  - Land: 35.60 sq mi (92.21 km^{2})
  - Water: 0.27 sq mi (0.71 km^{2}) 0.76%
- Elevation: 1,234 ft (376 m)

Population (2000)
  - Total: 760
  - Density: 21/sq mi (8.2/km^{2})
- Time zone: UTC-6 (CST)
  - Summer (DST): UTC-5 (CDT)
- FIPS code: 20-74900
- GNIS ID: 474804
- Website: County website

Walnut Township is a township in Butler County, Kansas, United States. As of the 2000 census, its population was 760.

== History ==
Walnut Township was organized in 1867.

== Geography ==
Walnut Township covers an area of 35.88 square miles (92.9 km^{2}) and contains no incorporated settlements. According to the USGS, it contains three cemeteries: Fairview, Golden and Little Walnut.

The stream of Fourmile Creek runs through this township.
