= Clifford Township, Kansas =

Clifford Township Butler County, Kansas
- Township
- Location within Butler County

- Location within Kansas
- Coordinates: 38°02′35″N 096°58′41″W
- Country: United States
- State: Kansas
- County: Butler

Area
  - Total: 41.8 sq mi (108.3 km^{2})
  - Land: 41.7 sq mi (108.1 km^{2})
  - Water: 0.077 sq mi (0.2 km^{2}) 0.18%
- Elevation: 1,417 ft (432 m)

Population (2000)
  - Total: 259
  - Density: 6.21/sq mi (2.40/km^{2})
- Time zone: UTC-6 (CST)
  - Summer (DST): UTC-5 (CDT)
- FIPS code: 20-14175
- GNIS ID: 474376
- Website: County website

Clifford Township is a township in Butler County, Kansas, United States. As of the 2000 census, its population was 259.

== History ==
Clifford Township was organized in 1876. The township was named for John A. Clifford, a pioneer settler.

== Geography ==
Clifford Township covers an area of 41.81 square miles (108.3 km^{2}) and contains no incorporated settlements.

== Cemeteries ==
The township contains the following cemeteries:

- Clifford Cemetery (aka Pleasant Center Cemetery), located in Section 14 T23S R4E.
- Ebenezer Methodist Church Cemetery, located in Section 19 T23S R5E.
