= Clay Township, Butler County, Kansas =

Clay Township Butler County, Kansas
- Township
- Location within Butler County

- Location within Kansas
- Coordinates: 37°31′30″N 096°46′51″W
- Country: United States
- State: Kansas
- County: Butler

Area
  - Total: 36.43 sq mi (94.36 km^{2})
  - Land: 36.35 sq mi (94.15 km^{2})
  - Water: 0.081 sq mi (0.21 km^{2}) 0.22%
- Elevation: 1,335 ft (407 m)

Population (2000)
  - Total: 83
  - Density: 2.3/sq mi (0.88/km^{2})
- Time zone: UTC-6 (CST)
  - Summer (DST): UTC-5 (CDT)
- FIPS code: 20-13575
- GNIS ID: 470031
- Website: County website

Clay Township is a township in Butler County, Kansas, United States. As of the 2000 census, its population was 83.

== History ==
Clay Township was created in 1879.

== Geography ==
Clay Township covers an area of 36.43 square miles (94.4 km^{2}) and contains no incorporated settlements. According to the United States Geological Survey, it contains two cemeteries: Bryant and Lone Star.

The stream of North Branch Rock Creek runs through this township.
