= Augusta Township, Kansas =

Augusta Township Butler County, Kansas
- Township
- Location within Butler County

- Location within Kansas
- Coordinates: 37°41′40″N 096°59′21″W
- Country: United States
- State: Kansas
- County: Butler

Area
  - Total: 32.53 sq mi (84.25 km^{2})
  - Land: 32.31 sq mi (83.68 km^{2})
  - Water: 0.22 sq mi (0.57 km^{2}) 0.68%
- Elevation: 1,227 ft (374 m)

Population (2000)
  - Total: 1,405
  - Density: 43.49/sq mi (16.79/km^{2})
- Time zone: UTC-6 (CST)
  - Summer (DST): UTC-5 (CDT)
- FIPS code: 20-03325
- GNIS ID: 474835
- Website: County website

Augusta Township is a township in Butler County, Kansas, United States. As of the 2000 census, its population was 1,405.

== History ==
Augusta Township was organized in 1870. It was named Augusta in honor of a postmaster's wife.

== Geography ==
Augusta Township covers an area of 32.53 square miles (84.3 km^{2}) and contains one incorporated settlement, Augusta. According to the USGS, it contains one cemetery, Calvary. It also contains a cemetery called Augusta Township Cemetery (Kuster).

The streams of Elm Creek and Whitewater River run through this township.

== Transportation ==
Augusta Township contains three airports or landing strips: Augusta Airport, Augusta Municipal Airport and Sills Air Park.
