= Latham, Kansas =

City in Butler County, Kansas

- City
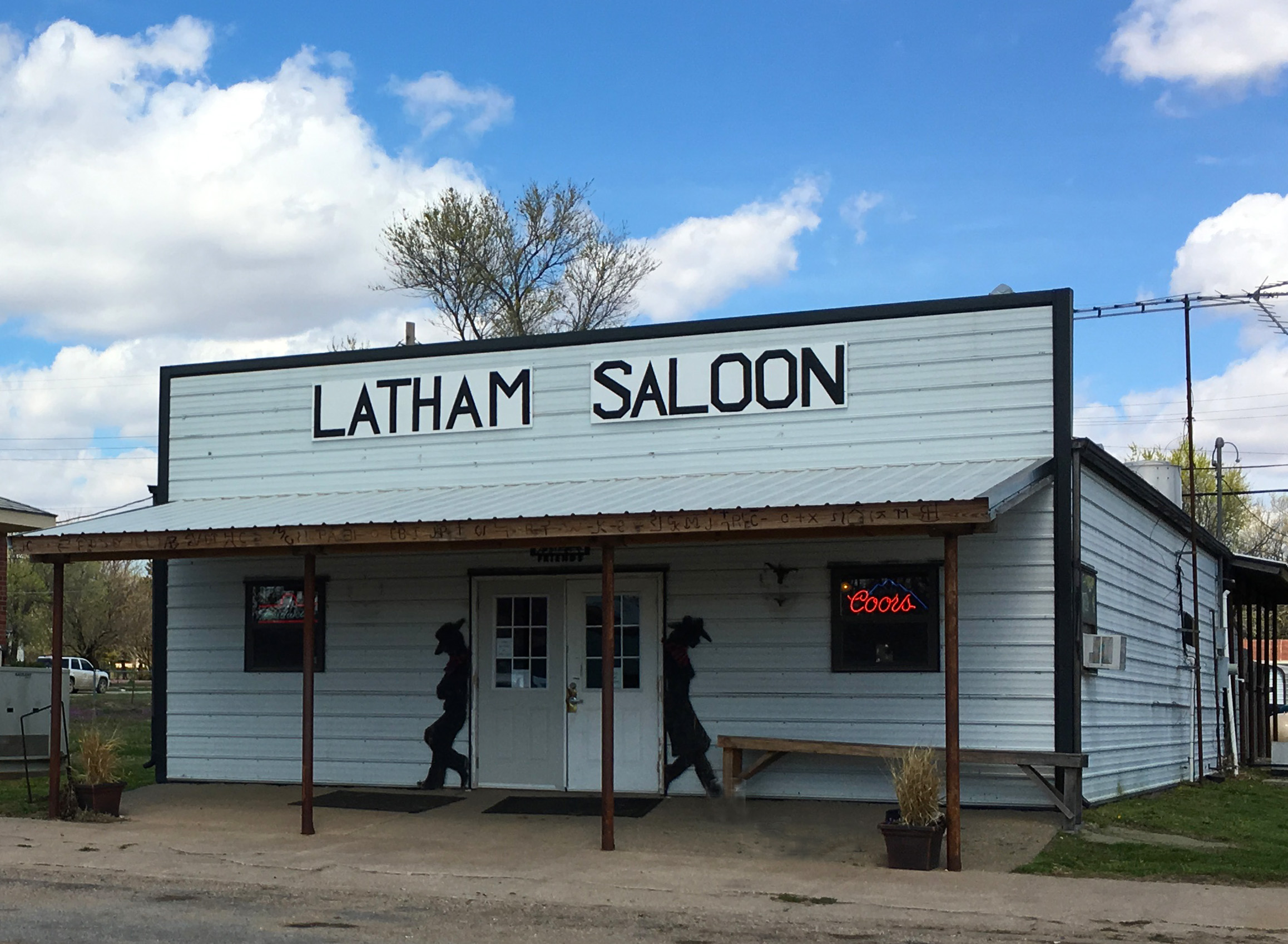
- Latham Saloon and restaurant (2016)

- Location within Butler County and Kansas

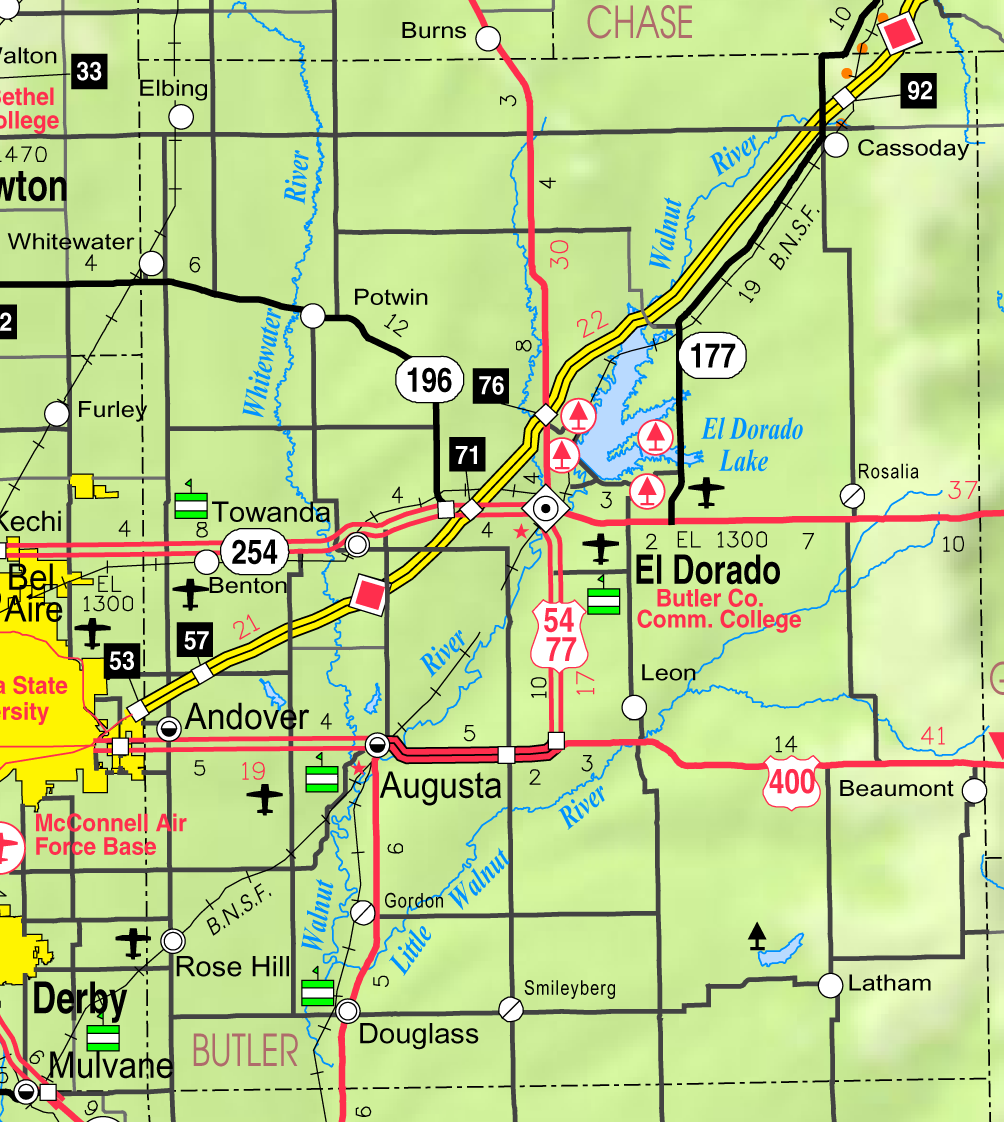
- KDOT map of Butler County (legend)
- Coordinates: 37°32′08″N 96°38′33″W
- Country: United States
- State: Kansas
- County: Butler
- Founded: 1880s
- Platted: 1885
- Incorporated: 1902
- Named for: Latham Young

Area
  - Total: 0.22 sq mi (0.56 km^{2})
  - Land: 0.22 sq mi (0.56 km^{2})
  - Water: 0 sq mi (0.00 km^{2})
- Elevation: 1,467 ft (447 m)

Population (2020)
  - Total: 96
  - Density: 440/sq mi (170/km^{2})
- Time zone: UTC-6 (CST)
  - Summer (DST): UTC-5 (CDT)
- ZIP Code: 67072
- Area code: 620
- FIPS code: 20-38775
- GNIS ID: 2395638

Latham is a city in Butler County, Kansas, United States. As of the 2020 census, the population of the city was 96.

== History ==
Latham was laid out in 1885. It may have been named for Latham Young, a railroad official.

A post office was opened in Bodock (an extinct town) in 1883, but it was moved to Latham in 1885.

The first newspaper in Latham was founded in 1901.

== Geography ==
According to the United States Census Bureau, the city has a total area of 0.25 square miles (0.65 km^{2}), all land.

== Demographics ==
Historical population
Census	Pop.	Note	%±
1890	268		—
1910	364		—
1920	334		−8.2%
1930	291		−12.9%
1940	307		5.5%
1950	218		−29.0%
1960	203		−6.9%
1970	156		−23.2%
1980	148		−5.1%
1990	160		8.1%
2000	164		2.5%
2010	139		−15.2%
2020	96		−30.9%
U.S. Decennial Census

=== 2020 census ===
The 2020 United States census counted 96 people, 47 households, and 26 families in Latham. The population density was 442.4 per square mile (170.8/km^{2}). There were 64 housing units at an average density of 294.9 per square mile (113.9/km^{2}). The racial makeup was 86.46% (83) white or European American (85.42% non-Hispanic white), 0.0% (0) black or African-American, 0.0% (0) Native American or Alaska Native, 0.0% (0) Asian, 0.0% (0) Pacific Islander or Native Hawaiian, 0.0% (0) from other races, and 13.54% (13) from two or more races. Hispanic or Latino of any race was 4.17% (4) of the population.

Of the 47 households, 25.5% had children under the age of 18; 38.3% were married couples living together; 17.0% had a female householder with no spouse or partner present. 34.0% of households consisted of individuals and 21.3% had someone living alone who was 65 years of age or older. The average household size was 1.8 and the average family size was 1.9. The percent of those with a bachelor's degree or higher was estimated to be 2.1% of the population.

14.6% of the population was under the age of 18, 1.0% from 18 to 24, 18.8% from 25 to 44, 45.8% from 45 to 64, and 19.8% who were 65 years of age or older. The median age was 54.0 years. For every 100 females, there were 71.4 males. For every 100 females ages 18 and older, there were 70.8 males.

The 2016–2020 5-year American Community Survey estimates show that males had a median income of $66,250 (+/- $39,944) versus $3,926 (+/- $632) for females. Approximately, 79.6% of families and 64.1% of the population were below the poverty line, including 69.5% of those under the age of 18 and 0.0% of those ages 65 or over.

=== 2010 census ===
As of the census of 2010, there were 139 people, 61 households, and 36 families living in the city. The population density was 556.0 inhabitants per square mile (214.7/km^{2}). There were 82 housing units at an average density of 328.0 per square mile (126.6/km^{2}). The racial makeup of the city was 96.4% White, 1.4% Native American, and 2.2% from two or more races. Hispanic or Latino of any race were 2.2% of the population.

There were 61 households, of which 31.1% had children under the age of 18 living with them, 42.6% were married couples living together, 9.8% had a female householder with no husband present, 6.6% had a male householder with no wife present, and 41.0% were non-families. 37.7% of all households were made up of individuals, and 6.5% had someone living alone who was 65 years of age or older. The average household size was 2.28 and the average family size was 2.86.

The median age in the city was 43.3 years. 26.6% of residents were under the age of 18; 4.4% were between the ages of 18 and 24; 20.9% were from 25 to 44; 35.3% were from 45 to 64; and 12.9% were 65 years of age or older. The gender makeup of the city was 51.1% male and 48.9% female.

=== 2000 census ===
As of the census of 2000, there were 164 people, 65 households, and 41 families living in the city. The population density was 682.8 inhabitants per square mile (263.6/km^{2}). There were 81 housing units at an average density of 337.2 per square mile (130.2/km^{2}). The racial makeup of the city was 93.90% White, 0.61% Native American, and 5.49% from two or more races. Hispanic or Latino of any race were 0.61% of the population.

There were 65 households, out of which 33.8% had children under the age of 18 living with them, 52.3% were married couples living together, 7.7% had a female householder with no husband present, and 35.4% were non-families. 32.3% of all households were made up of individuals, and 10.8% had someone living alone who was 65 years of age or older. The average household size was 2.52 and the average family size was 3.17.

In the city, the population was spread out, with 34.1% under the age of 18, 6.1% from 18 to 24, 30.5% from 25 to 44, 20.1% from 45 to 64, and 9.1% who were 65 years of age or older. The median age was 32 years. For every 100 females, there were 105.0 males. For every 100 females age 18 and over, there were 116.0 males.

The median income for a household in the city was $35,417, and the median income for a family was $42,292. Males had a median income of $33,750 versus $25,536 for females. The per capita income for the city was $13,385. About 12.8% of families and 21.7% of the population were below the poverty line, including 33.3% of those under the age of eighteen and 66.7% of those 65 or over.

== Education ==
The community is served by Bluestem USD 205 public school district.

Latham High School was closed through school unification. The Latham High School mascot was Crusaders.
