= Murdock Township, Kansas =

Murdock Township Butler County, Kansas
- Township
- Location within Butler County

- Location within Kansas
- Coordinates: 37°52′N 97°6′W
- Country: United States
- State: Kansas
- County: Butler

Area
  - Total: 36.01 sq mi (93.27 km^{2})
  - Land: 36.01 sq mi (93.27 km^{2})
  - Water: 0 sq mi (0 km^{2}) 0%
- Elevation: 1,358 ft (414 m)

Population (2000)
  - Total: 378
  - Density: 10.5/sq mi (4.05/km^{2})
- Time zone: UTC-6 (CST)
  - Summer (DST): UTC-5 (CDT)
- FIPS code: 20-49225
- GNIS ID: 473878
- Website: County website

Murdock Township is a township in Butler County, Kansas, United States. As of the 2000 census, its population was 378.

== History ==
Murdock Township was named for Thomas Benton Murdock, a native of Virginia who settled in Butler County.

Anthony G. Davis is reported to be the first settler in Murdock Township, arriving in 1857.

Murdock Township was organized in March 1873 and voting occurred in April 1873.

== Geography ==
Murdock Township covers an area of 36.01 square miles (93.3 km^{2}) and contains no incorporated settlements. According to the USGS, it contains two cemeteries: Shafer and Union.

The streams of Fourmile Creek, Prairie Creek, Whitewater Creek and Wildcat Creek run through this township.
