= Glencoe Township, Kansas =

Glencoe Township Butler County, Kansas
- Township
- Location within Butler County

- Location within Kansas
- Coordinates: 37°41′40″N 096°37′28″W
- Country: United States
- State: Kansas
- County: Butler

Area
  - Total: 62.60 sq mi (162.13 km^{2})
  - Land: 62.22 sq mi (161.15 km^{2})
  - Water: 0.38 sq mi (0.98 km^{2}) 0.6%
- Elevation: 1,493 ft (455 m)

Population (2000)
  - Total: 239
  - Density: 3.84/sq mi (1.48/km^{2})
- Time zone: UTC-6 (CST)
  - Summer (DST): UTC-5 (CDT)
- FIPS code: 20-26400
- GNIS ID: 474845
- Website: County website

Glencoe Township is a township in Butler County, Kansas, United States. As of the 2000 census, its population was 239.

== History ==
Glencoe Township was created in 1877.

== Geography ==
Glencoe Township covers an area of 62.6 square miles (162 km^{2}) and contains no incorporated settlements. According to the USGS, it contains three cemeteries: Beaumont, Butts and Harmony.

== Transportation ==
Glencoe Township contains one airport or landing strip, Beaumont Hotel Airport.
