= Richland Township, Butler County, Kansas =

Richland Township Butler County, Kansas
- Township
- Location within Butler County

- Location within Kansas
- Coordinates: 37°31′10″N 097°05′56″W
- Country: United States
- State: Kansas
- County: Butler

Area
  - Total: 36.31 sq mi (94.03 km^{2})
  - Land: 36.30 sq mi (94.01 km^{2})
  - Water: 0.0077 sq mi (0.02 km^{2}) 0.02%
- Elevation: 1,306 ft (398 m)

Population (2000)
  - Total: 2,399
  - Density: 66.09/sq mi (25.52/km^{2})
- Time zone: UTC-6 (CST)
  - Summer (DST): UTC-5 (CDT)
- FIPS code: 20-59250
- GNIS ID: 474367
- Website: County website

Richland Township is a township in Butler County, Kansas, United States. As of the 2000 census, its population was 2,399.

== History ==
Richland Township was organized in 1874.

== Geography ==
Richland Township covers an area of 36.3 square miles (94 km^{2}) and contains no incorporated settlements. According to the USGS, it contains two cemeteries: Friends and Richland.

The stream of Maple Creek runs through this township.
