= Darlington Township, Kansas =

Township in Kansas, United States

Darlington Township Harvey County, Kansas
- Township
- Location within Harvey County

- Location within state of Kansas
- Coordinates: 37°57′20″N 97°19′6″W
- Country: United States
- State: Kansas
- County: Harvey

Area
  - Total: 35.53 sq mi (92.03 km^{2})
  - Land: 35.50 sq mi (91.94 km^{2})
  - Water: 0.035 sq mi (0.09 km^{2}) 0.1%
- Elevation: 1,437 ft (438 m)

Population (2020)
  - Total: 586
  - Density: 16.5/sq mi (6.37/km^{2})
- Time zone: UTC-6 (CST)
  - Summer (DST): UTC-5 (CDT)
- FIPS code: 20-17025
- GNIS ID: 473686
- Website: County website

Darlington Township is a township in Harvey County, Kansas, United States. As of the 2020 census, its population was 586.

== Geography ==
Darlington Township covers an area of 35.53 square miles (92.0 km^{2}) and contains no incorporated settlements. The streams of East Fork Jester Creek and West Fork Jester Creek run through this township.
