= Benton Township, Butler County, Kansas =

Benton Township Butler County, Kansas
- Township
- Location within Butler County

- Location within Kansas
- Coordinates: 37°46′00″N 097°05′56″W
- Country: United States
- State: Kansas
- County: Butler

Area
  - Total: 36.09 sq mi (93.47 km^{2})
  - Land: 36.09 sq mi (93.47 km^{2})
  - Water: 0 sq mi (0 km^{2}) 0%
- Elevation: 1,378 ft (420 m)

Population (2000)
  - Total: 2,211
  - Density: 61.27/sq mi (23.65/km^{2})
- Time zone: UTC-6 (CST)
  - Summer (DST): UTC-5 (CDT)
- FIPS code: 20-06200
- GNIS ID: 473879
- Website: County website

Benton Township is a township in Butler County, Kansas, United States. As of the 2000 census, its population was 2,211.

== History ==
Benton Township was organized in 1872. It was named for Thomas Benton Murdock, a state politician.

== Geography ==
Benton Township covers an area of 36.09 square miles (93.5 km^{2}) and contains one incorporated settlement, Benton. According to the USGS, it contains three cemeteries: Benton, Indianola and Old Benton.

== Transportation ==
Benton Township contains one airport or landing strip, Benton Airport.
