= Kechi, Kansas =

City in Sedgwick County, Kansas

- City
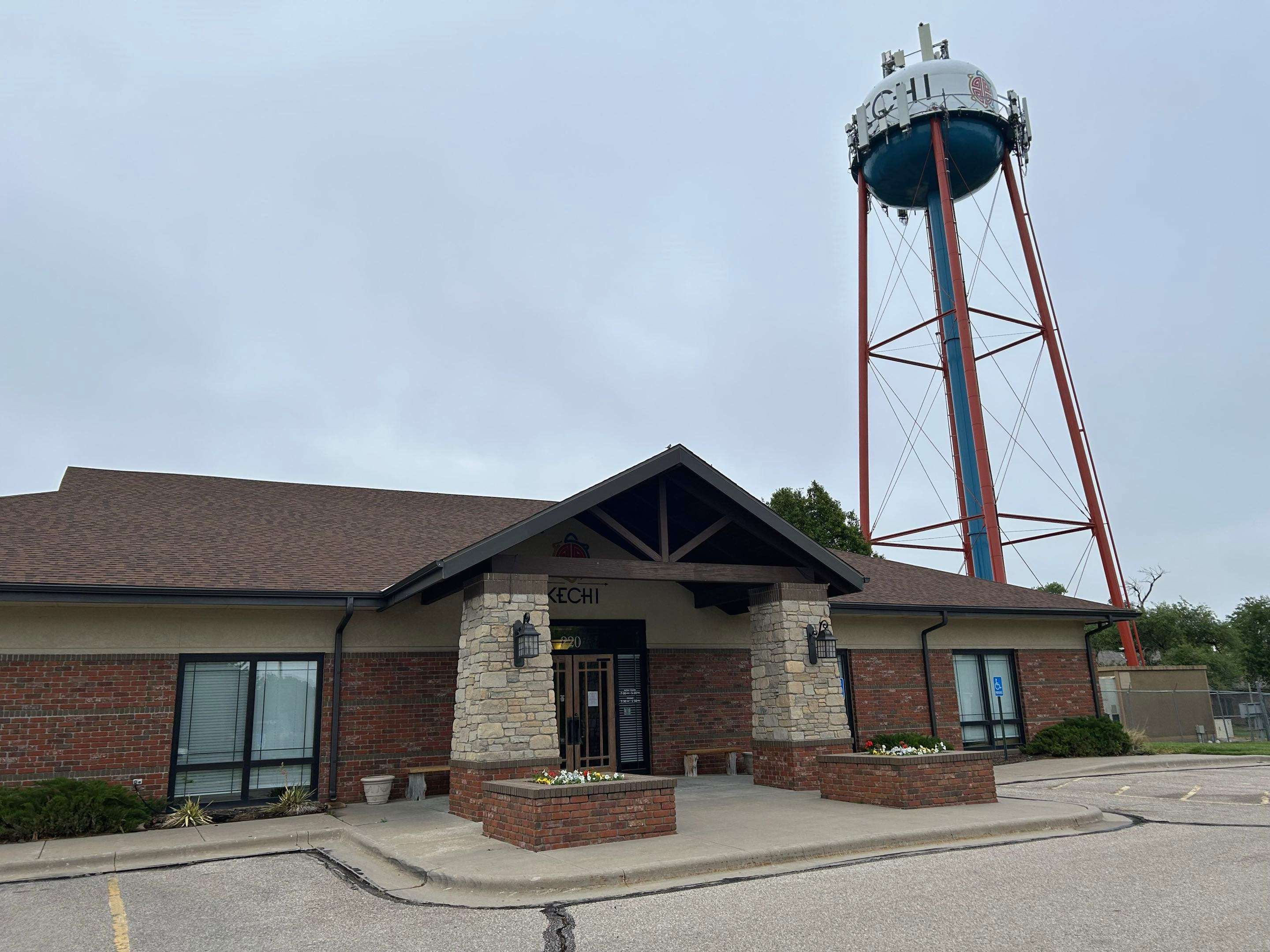
- City hall and water tower in Kechi (2026)

- Location within Sedgwick County and Kansas
- Interactive map of Kechi, Kansas
- Coordinates: 37°47′43″N 97°16′43″W
- Country: United States
- State: Kansas
- County: Sedgwick
- Founded: 1880s
- Incorporated: 1957
- Named for: Kichai people

Area
  - Total: 6.08 sq mi (15.74 km^{2})
  - Land: 6.03 sq mi (15.61 km^{2})
  - Water: 0.050 sq mi (0.13 km^{2})
- Elevation: 1,381 ft (421 m)

Population (2020)
  - Total: 2,217
  - Density: 367.8/sq mi (142.0/km^{2})
- Time zone: UTC-6 (CST)
  - Summer (DST): UTC-5 (CDT)
- ZIP Code: 67067
- Area code: 316
- FIPS code: 20-36225
- GNIS ID: 473859
- Website: kechiks.gov

Kechi /ˈkiːtʃaɪ/ is a city in Sedgwick County, Kansas, United States, and a suburb of Wichita. As of the 2020 census, the population of the city was 2,217.

== History ==
=== 19th century ===
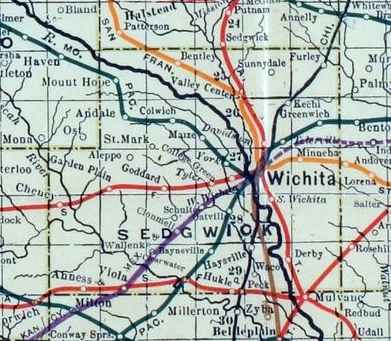
1915 railroad map of Sedgwick County

Kechi was named for the Kichai people.

In 1887, the Chicago, Kansas and Nebraska Railway built a branch line north-south from Herington through Kechi to Caldwell. It foreclosed in 1891 and was taken over by Chicago, Rock Island and Pacific Railway, which shut down in 1980 and reorganized as Oklahoma, Kansas and Texas Railroad, merged in 1988 with Missouri Pacific Railroad, merged in 1997 with Union Pacific Railroad. Most locals still refer to this railroad as the "Rock Island".

The first post office in Kechi was established in 1888.

== Geography ==
Kechi is located at 37°47′43″N 97°16′43″W (37.795228, -97.278660). According to the United States Census Bureau, the city has a total area of 6.02 square miles (15.59 km^{2}), of which 5.97 square miles (15.46 km^{2}) is land and 0.05 square miles (0.13 km^{2}) is water.

== Demographics ==
Historical population
Census	Pop.	Note	%±
1960	245		—
1970	229		−6.5%
1980	288		25.8%
1990	517		79.5%
2000	1,038		100.8%
2010	1,909		83.9%
2020	2,217		16.1%
U.S. Decennial Census

Kechi is part of the Wichita, KS Metropolitan Statistical Area.

=== 2020 census ===
As of the 2020 census, Kechi had a population of 2,217 people. The population density was 367.9 per square mile (142.0/km^{2}). There were 871 housing units at an average density of 144.5 per square mile (55.8/km^{2}).

Of the population, 22.2% was under the age of 18, 8.3% was from 18 to 24, 23.4% was from 25 to 44, 29.3% was from 45 to 64, and 16.9% was 65 years of age or older. The median age was 41.2 years. For every 100 females, there were 103.8 males, and for every 100 females ages 18 and older, there were 103.5 males.

There were 840 households and 661 families, with 33.2% of households having children under the age of 18. Of all households, 67.3% were married-couple households, 10.6% were households with a male householder and no spouse or partner present, and 16.7% were households with a female householder and no spouse or partner present. About 15.7% of households were made up of individuals, and 8.6% had someone living alone who was 65 years of age or older.

Of Kechi residents, 76.2% lived in urban areas and 23.8% lived in rural areas.

Racial composition as of the 2020 census
Race	Number	Percent
White	1,839	82.9%
Black or African American	101	4.6%
American Indian and Alaska Native	22	1.0%
Asian	45	2.0%
Native Hawaiian and Other Pacific Islander	1	0.0%
Some other race	55	2.5%
Two or more races	154	6.9%
Hispanic or Latino (of any race)	131	5.9%

Non-Hispanic white residents were 80.97% of the population.

=== Demographic estimates ===
The 2016–2020 5-year American Community Survey estimates show that the average household size was 3.1 and the average family size was 3.4. The percent of those with a bachelor's degree or higher was estimated to be 35.0% of the population.

=== Income and poverty ===
The 2016–2020 5-year American Community Survey estimates show that the median household income was $100,069 (with a margin of error of +/- $6,154) and the median family income was $103,854 (+/- $5,773). Males had a median income of $59,268 (+/- $8,204) versus $28,571 (+/- $3,892) for females. The median income for those above 16 years old was $42,955 (+/- $7,572). Approximately, 2.9% of families and 2.9% of the population were below the poverty line, including 1.1% of those under the age of 18 and 7.5% of those ages 65 or over.

=== 2010 census ===
As of the census of 2010, there were 1,909 people, 701 households, and 566 families living in the city. The population density was 319.8 inhabitants per square mile (123.5/km^{2}). There were 732 housing units at an average density of 122.6 per square mile (47.3/km^{2}). The racial makeup of the city was 87.7% White, 5.5% African American, 0.9% Native American, 2.0% Asian, 1.2% from other races, and 2.8% from two or more races. Hispanic or Latino of any race were 3.1% of the population.

There were 701 households, of which 33.2% had children under the age of 18 living with them, 73.0% were married couples living together, 5.6% had a female householder with no husband present, 2.1% had a male householder with no wife present, and 19.3% were non-families. 15.5% of all households were made up of individuals, and 4.6% had someone living alone who was 65 years of age or older. The average household size was 2.72 and the average family size was 3.06.

The median age in the city was 42.6 years. 24.6% of residents were under the age of 18; 6.1% were between the ages of 18 and 24; 22.7% were from 25 to 44; 36% were from 45 to 64; and 10.7% were 65 years of age or older. The gender makeup of the city was 49.7% male and 50.3% female.

== Education ==
The city is served by Wichita USD 259 and Valley Center USD 262 public school districts.

== Transportation ==
The Chicago, Rock Island and Pacific Railroad formerly provided passenger rail service to Kechi on their mainline from Minneapolis to Houston until at least 1951. As of 2025, the nearest passenger rail station is located in Newton, where Amtrak's Southwest Chief stops once daily on a route from Chicago to Los Angeles.
