= Pleasant Township, Butler County, Kansas =

Pleasant Township Butler County, Kansas
- Township
- Location within Butler County

- Location within Kansas
- Coordinates: 37°36′25″N 97°5′56″W
- Country: United States
- State: Kansas
- County: Butler

Area
  - Total: 36.10 sq mi (93.49 km^{2})
  - Land: 36.06 sq mi (93.39 km^{2})
  - Water: 0.039 sq mi (0.1 km^{2}) 0.11%
- Elevation: 1,329 ft (405 m)

Population (2000)
  - Total: 4,649
  - Density: 128.9/sq mi (49.78/km^{2})
- Time zone: UTC-6 (CST)
  - Summer (DST): UTC-5 (CDT)
- FIPS code: 20-56200
- GNIS ID: 474233
- Website: County website

Pleasant Township is a township in Butler County, Kansas, United States. As of the 2000 census, its population was 4,649.

== History ==
Pleasant Township was organized in 1873.

== Geography ==
Pleasant Township covers an area of 36.1 square miles (93 km^{2}) and contains one incorporated settlement, Rose Hill. According to the USGS, it contains two cemeteries: Dunlap and Rose Hill.

== Transportation ==
Pleasant Township contains three airports or landing strips: Flying H Ranch Airport, Graham Airport and Trabue Airport.
