= Bruno Township, Kansas =

Bruno Township Butler County, Kansas
- Township
- Location within Butler County

- Location within Kansas
- Coordinates: 37°41′40″N 097°05′56″W
- Country: United States
- State: Kansas
- County: Butler

Area
  - Total: 35.07 sq mi (90.84 km^{2})
  - Land: 35.03 sq mi (90.74 km^{2})
  - Water: 0.035 sq mi (0.09 km^{2}) 0.1%
- Elevation: 1,342 ft (409 m)

Population (2000)
  - Total: 9,744
  - Density: 278.1/sq mi (107.4/km^{2})
- Time zone: UTC-6 (CST)
  - Summer (DST): UTC-5 (CDT)
- FIPS code: 20-08825
- GNIS ID: 474232
- Website: County website

Bruno Township is a township in Butler County, Kansas, United States. As of the 2000 census, its population was 9,744.

== History ==
Bruno Township was organized in 1873.

== Geography ==
Bruno Township covers an area of 35.07 square miles (90.8 km^{2}) and contains one incorporated settlement, Andover. According to the USGS, it contains one cemetery, Andover.

The stream of Republican Creek runs through this township.
