= Area code 316 =

Telephone area code for Wichita, Kansas

Coordinates: 37°41′N 97°20′W

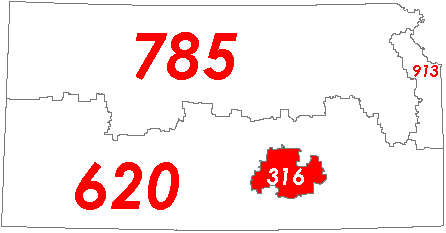
Map of Kansas with area code 316 in red

Area code 316 is the telephone area code in the North American Numbering Plan (NANP) for the city of Wichita, Kansas, and surrounding communities. The area code was one of the original North American area codes and formerly served all of southern Kansas. Today it is an enclave area code, in that it is surrounded by area code 620.

== History ==
Despite its relatively modest population, Kansas was divided into two numbering plan areas (NPAs) when the original North American Numbering Plan was established in 1947. Under a preliminary plan, area codes were to be assigned sequentially based on geography and Kansas received area codes 617 and 618. When the final plan was adopted In October 1947, Kansas' two numbering plan areas were redrawn. The southern half (Wichita, Kansas, Dodge City, Emporia, Garden City) received 316, while the northern half (Kansas City, Topeka, Lawrence, Salina, Hays) got 913. Long-distance dialing by subscribers using area codes would not be implemented until late 1951 in New Jersey.

The 316-913 dividing line ran from west to east roughly following a path along K-4 and K-96. It dipped along I-135 in McPherson County and continued east to just north of Emporia in Lyon County, and ended at the Missouri state line.

The north-south split avoided cutting the major toll traffic routes that ran in east-west directions, a rule of traffic and implementation cost analysis. However, a north-south split would have been necessary in any event because Kansas' three largest cities, and hence the bulk of the state's landlines, are all in the east.

=== Kansas goes from two area codes to four ===
The configuration with two area codes remained constant for more than 40 years. But by the mid-1990s, the pool of available exchange codes in area code 913 was being exhausted due to rapid growth in demand on the Kansas side of the Kansas City metropolitan area, particularly Overland Park and Johnson County from the proliferation of cell phones and pagers.

Late in 1996, the Kansas Corporation Commission (KCC), which oversees telecommunications in the state, requested relief from the North American Numbering Plan Administration (NANPA) for the exchanges of area code 913, and on February 12, 1997, the NANPA responded by splitting most of northern Kansas from area code 913 into the new area code 785. From July 20, 1997, through October 2, 1998, customers affected by the new area code could use either 913 or 785 when dialing long-distance. On October 3, 1998, the 785 area code became mandatory in the new calling area.

The southern half of the state would soon follow. With a similar proliferation of cell phones, especially in and around Wichita, the KCC requested relief for area code 316. On September 21, 2000, the NANPA split off most of southern Kansas and gave it the new 620 area code, which now completely surrounds 316, making it one of the six pairs of doughnut area codes in the numbering plan (and the only one that is not currently part of an overlay complex in itself). 620 began its split on February 3, 2001; permissive dialing of 316 continued across southern Kansas until November 2, 2001.

Even with the continued proliferation of cell phones and pagers, 316 is nowhere near exhaustion. Under current projections, Wichita will not need another area code until after 2050.

== Service area ==
- Andover
- Augusta
- Bel Aire
- Cheney
- Colwich
- Derby
- Douglass
- El Dorado
- Goddard
- Haysville
- Maize
- Mulvane
- Newton
- Park City
- Rose Hill
- Valley Center
- Wichita

== Boundaries ==
When most of the area of the original numbering plan area was reassigned with the new area code 620, all of Sedgwick County, home to Wichita, as well as portions of Butler, Kingman, Reno, Harvey and Sumner counties remained in area code 316. This area is largely coextensive with the Wichita metropolitan area.

With the area code now shrunken to a fraction of its former size, 316 is the only one of Kansas' four area codes that does not reach the Missouri border.

Kansas area codes: 316, 620, 785, 913
	North: 620	
West: 620	area code 316	East: 620
	South: 620	
