= Plum Grove, Kansas =

- Ghost town
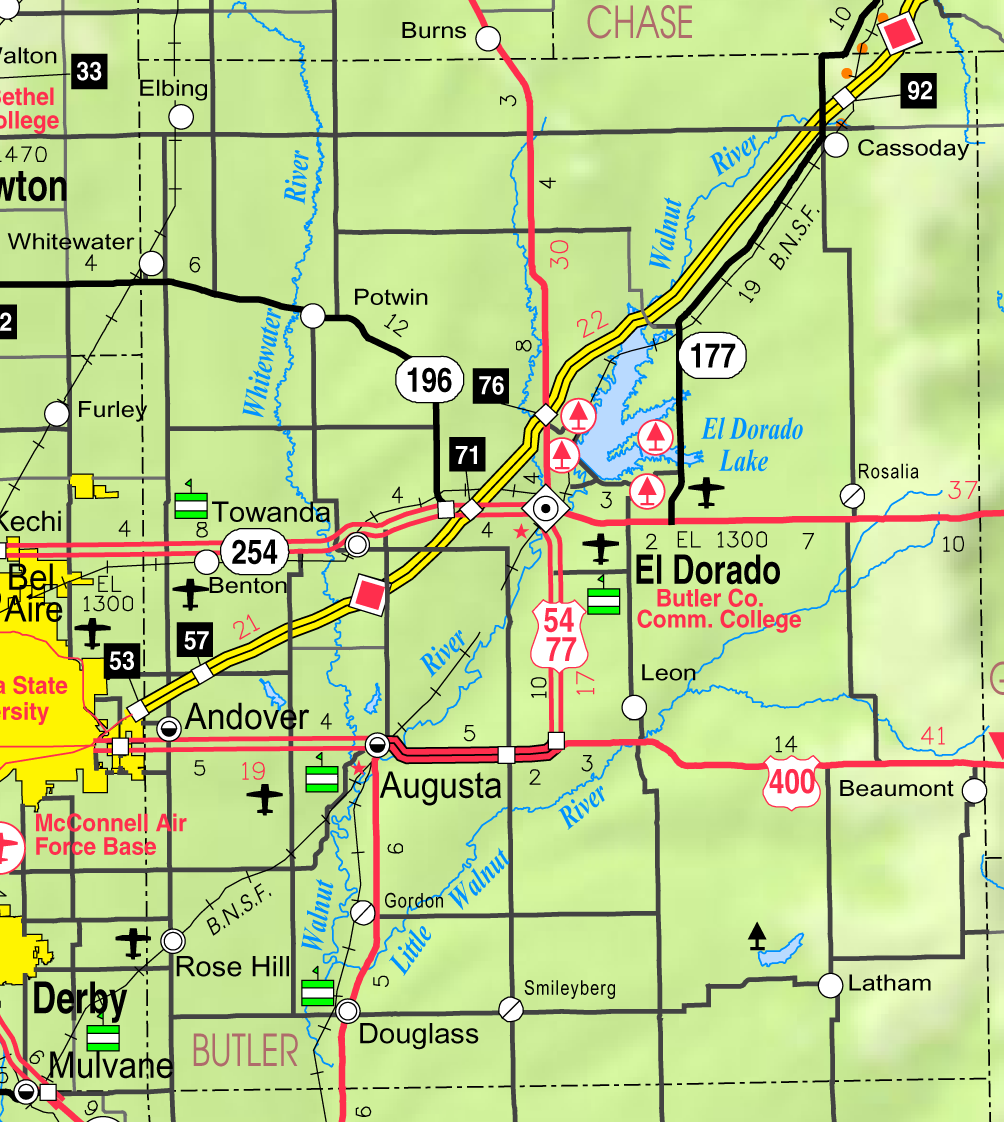
- KDOT map of Butler County (legend)

- Location within Kansas Location within the United States
- Coordinates: 37°59′6″N 97°2′31″W
- Country: United States
- State: Kansas
- County: Butler
- Township: Plum Grove and Milton
- Named for: Plum bushes

Population
  - Total: 0
- Time zone: UTC-6 (CST)
  - Summer (DST): UTC-5 (CDT)
- Area code: 620

Plum Grove is a ghost town in Butler County, Kansas, United States. It was located in a rural area north of modern-day Potwin. No buildings remain at this former community site.

== History ==
A post office named Plum Grove was established on July 1, 1870 in northwestern Butler County. The postmaster (and landowner) was John R. Wentworth and the post office was named for the established plum bushes near his homestead. This post office was located next to the East Branch of the Whitewater River near the modern day intersection of NW 110th Street and NW Buffalo Road. Over the next two years, some businesses were started at Plum Grove.

On October 7, 1872 a county election passed, funding bonds for a proposed railroad through the Whitewater River valley. The route was close to Plum Grove, so it was decided to move the tiny community 1.5 miles (2.4 km) west to ensure it would be next to the future railroad. The financial panic of 1873 caused the rail project to be abandoned. Though it was a setback, the community continued to grow while it kept trying to get a rail depot. At its peak, Plum Grove had a maximum population of 60 or 100 (depending on source), several general stores, drug store, tree nursery, boarding house, blacksmith shop / livery barn / hog pens, saw mill, and a community water well.

In the spring of 1885, the McPherson branch of the Missouri Pacific Railroad was built east/west, a few miles south of Plum Grove. Again a railroad failed to route through Plum Grove, after which the community started to dissolve. Merchants, houses, people moved over time to one of the nearby new communities of Brainerd or Potwin, and a small number to Whitewater and Peabody. In 1887, the Chicago, Kansas and Nebraska Railway was built north/south approximately five miles west of Plum Grove, and it was the "final straw". The post office closed on October 31, 1888 and most lots were vacated by 1889.

Afterward, the rural school was the only thing that remained. A new school was rebuilt at the site in 1895, and it served until 1955, when it was discontinued and the building was moved. The school water well was filled in the late 1960s, thus erasing the last evidence of Plum Grove. Today, it is active farmland.

== Geography ==
Plum Grove was located at the modern day intersection of NW 110th Street and NW Santa Fe Lake Road in northwestern Butler County, which is three miles north and one mile west of modern-day Potwin. It sits on the shared township boundary of Plum Grove and Milton.

== Education ==
The modern day rural area around Plum Grove is served by the Remington USD 206 public school district, and the rural Frederic Remington High School is about 4 miles south of the former Plum Grove.

== Notable people ==
- Daniel McCurdy Elder (1844-1923), 1889 member of the Kansas House of Representatives, saw mill owner/operator (Plum Grove and other sites along Whitewater River), stone quarry owner (east of El Dorado).
- Frederic Sackrider Remington (1861-1909), American Old West artist, sheep rancher. In 1883 to 1884, he owned a ranch north of Plum Grove. The south edge of it was located 2 miles north then 0.5 to 1.5 miles west. Initially his ranch started as 160 acres then later expanded to 320 acres. Many texts describe the location of his ranch near Peabody, because it was the closest railroad depot during that era. He spent free time in both communities. A monument dedicated to Remington is located at the nearby Frederic Remington High School.

== See also ==
Other communities with same name in Kansas:

- Plum Grove in Atchison County, where a post office existed from October 3, 1862 to January 6, 1868, then it was moved to the community of Oak Mills.
- Plum Grove in Jefferson County, a colony that exist from 1854 to 1855.
