= Whitewater High School =

Whitewater High School may refer to:

- Whitewater High School (Georgia), Fayetteville, Georgia
- Whitewater High School — Whitewater, Kansas, closed, merged with Frederic Remington High School
- Whitewater High School (Wisconsin)
