= Augusta Daily Gazette =

- Type: Daily newspaper
- Owner(s): GateHouse Media
- Publisher: Kent Bush
- Editor: Belinda Larsen
- Founded: c. 1902, as The Daily Gazette
- Headquarters: 204 East Fifth Street, Augusta, Kansas 67010, United States
- OCLC number: 9856509
- Website: AugustaGazette.com

The Augusta Daily Gazette was an American daily newspaper in Augusta, Kansas. It was owned by GateHouse Media.

The paper covered several communities in suburban Butler County, Kansas, part of the Wichita metropolitan area. In addition to Augusta, the Gazette's coverage area includes Andover, Douglass, Leon, Towanda and Rose Hill.

GateHouse has since merged the Gazette with the Andover American and The El Dorado Times. The new publication is called the Butler County Times-Gazette.

== See also ==
- List of newspapers in Kansas
