= Brainerd, Kansas =

Unincorporated community in Butler County, Kansas

- Unincorporated community
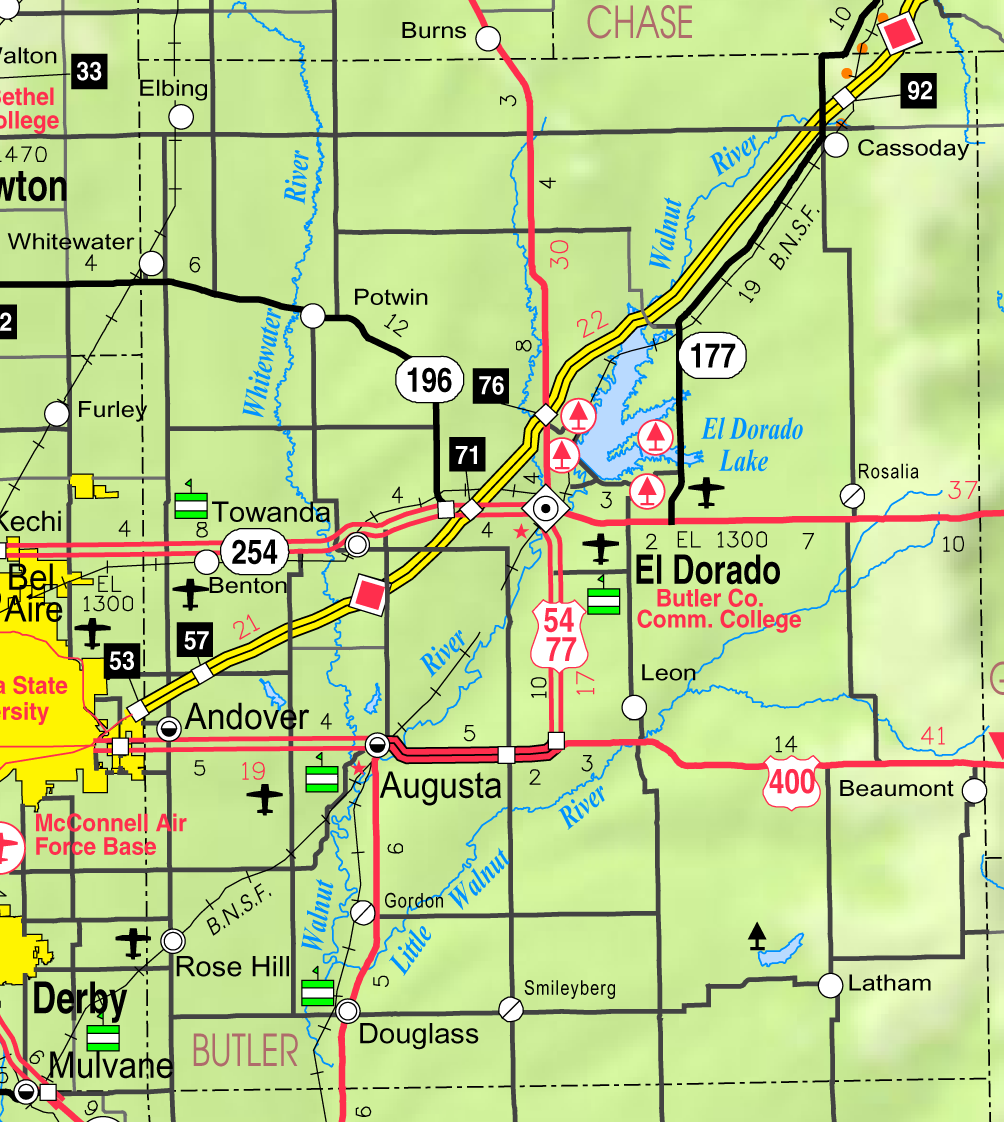
- KDOT map of Butler County (legend)

- Location within Kansas Location within the United States
- Coordinates: 37°57′04″N 97°05′43″W
- Country: United States
- State: Kansas
- County: Butler
- Township: Milton
- Platted: 1885
- Named for: Elisha B. Brainerd (landowner)
- Elevation: 1,385 ft (422 m)
- Time zone: UTC-6 (CST)
  - Summer (DST): UTC-5 (CDT)
- ZIP Code: 67154
- Area code: 316
- FIPS code: 20-08200
- GNIS ID: 473721

Brainerd is an unincorporated community in Butler County, Kansas, United States. It is located on the north side of K-196 highway between the cities of Whitewater and Potwin.

== History ==
=== Early history ===
For many millennia, the Great Plains of North America was inhabited by nomadic Native Americans. From the 16th century to 18th century, the Kingdom of France claimed ownership of large parts of North America. In 1762, after the French and Indian War, France secretly ceded New France to Spain, per the Treaty of Fontainebleau.

=== 19th century ===
In 1802, Spain returned most of the land to France. In 1803, most of the land for modern day Kansas was acquired by the United States from France as part of the 828,000 square mile Louisiana Purchase for 2.83 cents per acre.

In 1854, the Kansas Territory was organized, then in 1861 Kansas became the 34th U.S. state. In 1855, Butler County was established within the Kansas Territory, which included the land for modern day Brainerd.

A post office was established in Holden on December 14, 1870, then renamed to Brainerd on January 25, 1886. The post office closed on August 31, 1907.

Brainerd was platted in 1885 around a depot along the McPherson branch of the Missouri Pacific Railroad. The community was named for Elisha B. Brainerd, an original landowner. It quickly grew, including some businesses and houses from nearby community of Plum Grove.

=== 20th century ===
In 1961, Frederic Remington High School was built immediately north of Brainerd. Leading up to this new school, Whitewater, Potwin, Brainerd, Elbing, Furley, Countryside, and Golden Gate schools merged to form a joint rural high school. Heated opposition between Whitewater and Potwin occurred during the discussion for the location of the new high school. Rural voters pushed for a centralized location in neither town. A public vote was passed to build the new school near Brainerd.

=== 21st century ===
In 2006, the Remington Rock monument was built near the Frederic Remington High School.

== Geography ==
Brainerd is located at 37°57′4″N 97°5′43″W (37.9511267, -97.0953122), which is the north side of K-196 highway between the cities of Whitewater and Potwin.

== Education ==
The community is served by Remington USD 206 public school district. The Remington High School mascot is a Bronco.

- Frederic Remington High School north side of Brainerd.
- Remington Middle School in Whitewater.
- Remington Elementary School in Potwin.

== Media ==
=== Print ===
- The Newton Kansan, regional newspaper from Newton.
- Butler County Times-Gazette, regional newspaper from El Dorado.
- The Wichita Eagle, major regional newspaper from Wichita.

=== Radio ===
Brainerd is served by numerous radio stations of the Wichita-Hutchinson listening market area, and satellite radio. See Media in Wichita, Kansas.

=== Television ===
Brainerd is served by over-the-air ATSC digital TV of the Wichita-Hutchinson viewing market area, cable TV, and satellite TV. See Media in Wichita, Kansas.

== Infrastructure ==
=== Transportation ===
K-196 highway runs along the south side of the community.

The Missouri Pacific Railroad formerly provided passenger rail service along a route from Eldorado to McPherson although this had ended prior to 1946. As of 2025, the nearest passenger rail station is located in Newton, where Amtrak's Southwest Chief stops once daily on a route from Chicago to Los Angeles.
