= Madyan =

Madyan may refer to:

- Midian, a geographical place and a people mentioned in the Bible and in the Qur'an
- Madyan, Pakistan, a town in the Swat district of Pakistan

== See also ==
- Midian (disambiguation)
