= Fairmount Township =

Fairmount Township may refer to the following townships in the United States:

- Fairmount Township, Pike County, Illinois
- Fairmount Township, Grant County, Indiana
- Fairmount Township, Butler County, Kansas
- Fairmount Township, New Jersey
- Fairmount Township, Luzerne County, Pennsylvania
