= Elbing, Kansas =

City in Butler County, Kansas

- City
- Location within Butler County and Kansas

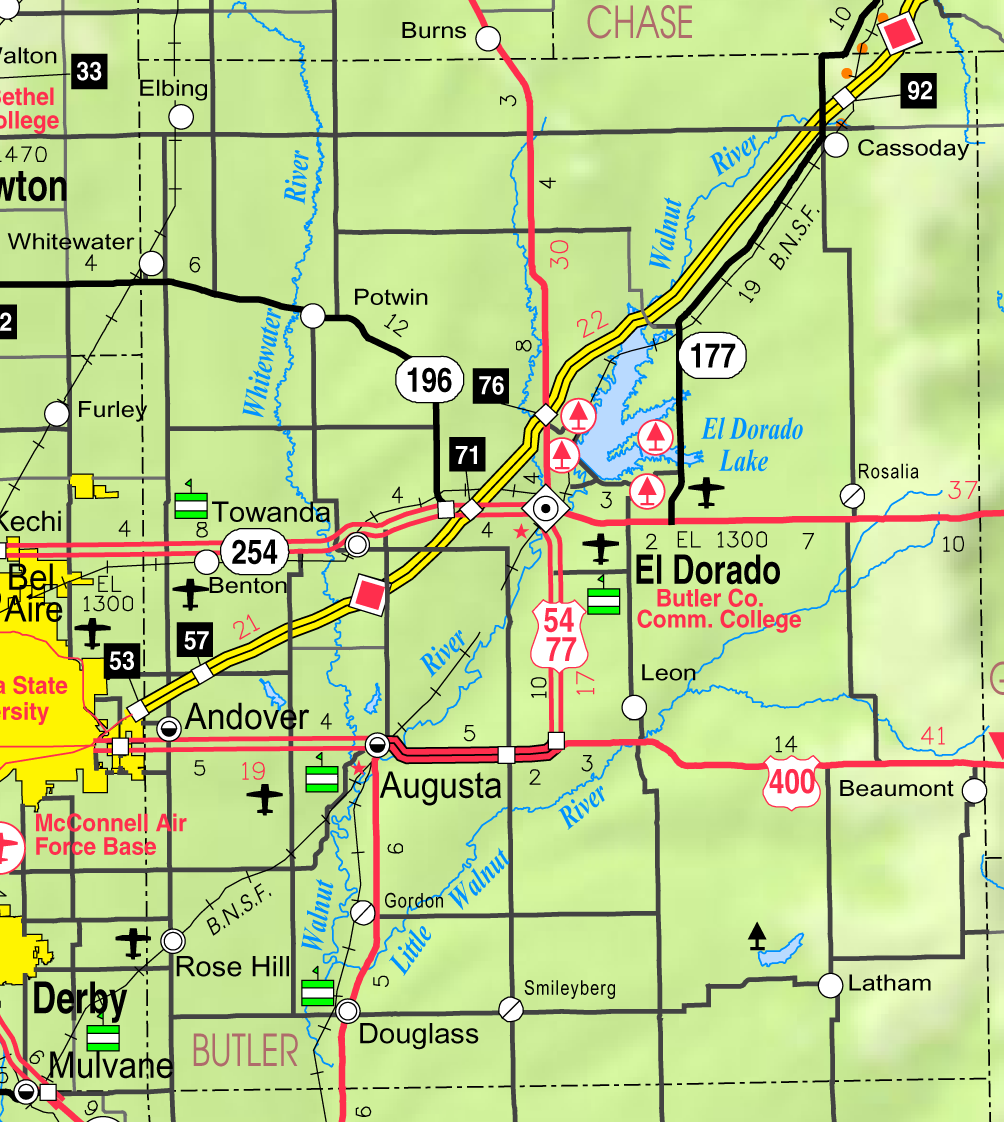
- KDOT map of Butler County (legend)
- Coordinates: 38°3′15″N 97°7′38″W
- Country: United States
- State: Kansas
- County: Butler
- Founded: 1887
- Incorporated: 1919
- Named for: Elbląg (Elbing)

Government
  - Type: Mayor–Council
  - Mayor: Clinton Clark

Area
  - Total: 0.17 sq mi (0.45 km^{2})
  - Land: 0.17 sq mi (0.45 km^{2})
  - Water: 0 sq mi (0.00 km^{2})
- Elevation: 1,437 ft (438 m)

Population (2020)
  - Total: 226
  - Density: 1,300/sq mi (500/km^{2})
- Time zone: UTC-6 (CST)
  - Summer (DST): UTC-5 (CDT)
- ZIP Code: 67041
- Area code: 316
- FIPS code: 20-20050
- GNIS ID: 2394635

Elbing is a city in Butler County, Kansas, United States. It is named after the city Elbląg (German: Elbing) in northern Poland, formerly Prussia. As of the 2020 census, the population of the city was 226. It is located about 10.7 miles east of Interstate 135 in Newton, along the Union Pacific Railroad.

== History ==
=== Early history ===
For many millennia, the Great Plains of North America was inhabited by nomadic Native Americans. From the 16th century to 18th century, the Kingdom of France claimed ownership of large parts of North America. In 1762, after the French and Indian War, France secretly ceded New France to Spain, per the Treaty of Fontainebleau.

=== 19th century ===
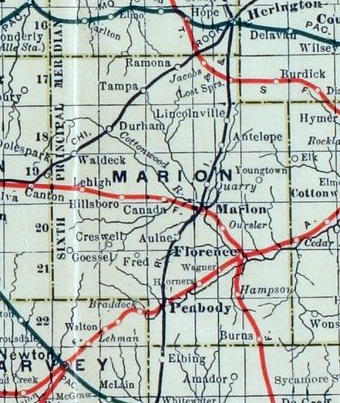
1915 railroad map of Marion County

In 1802, Spain returned most of the land to France. In 1803, most of the land for modern day Kansas was acquired by the United States from France as part of the 828,000 square mile Louisiana Purchase for 2.83 cents per acre.

In 1854, the Kansas Territory was organized, then in 1861 Kansas became the 34th U.S. state. In 1855, Butler County was established within the Kansas Territory, which included the land for modern day Elbing.

In 1887, the Chicago, Kansas and Nebraska Railway built a branch line north–south from Herington through Elbing to Caldwell. It foreclosed in 1891 and was taken over by Chicago, Rock Island and Pacific Railway, which shut down in 1980 and reorganized as Oklahoma, Kansas and Texas Railroad, merged in 1988 with Missouri Pacific Railroad, merged in 1997 with Union Pacific Railroad. Most locals still refer to this railroad as the "Rock Island".

The track passed through the land of Jacob W. Regier in section 17 of the Fairmount Township in Butler county in south central Kansas. The Regiers sold 80 acres (320,000 m^{2}) of section 17 to the Elbing Town Company for $5,000. The 1/4 mile by 1/2 mile plot ran along the west side of the CK&NR tracks. The railroad wanted to call the town Regier but Mr. Regier suggested three other possibilities: Elbing, Danzig and Marienburg, all cities in Prussia (Prussian Partition of Poland), where he had lived. Elbing was chosen. The town was founded May 18, 1887. Within a few months people began to build houses and businesses in Elbing. By November four passenger trains (two in each direction) served Elbing. The trains also provided mail delivery and pick-up twice daily.

A post office was established in Worth (an extinct town) on March 16, 1886, but was moved to Elbing on November 2, 1887.

School district 160 for the Elbing community was established in 1887 and provided public education for several local primary school students. The original frame building was replaced by a red brick building in 1919. The brick building stands vacant today and students who attend a public school travel to nearby cities.

The Methodist Episcopal Church, Elbing's first church, was built in 1905, but the church disbanded in 1937. The Missionary Church, built in Elbing in 1910, was used until the 1960s when the congregation moved to nearby Newton. The building was razed in 1975. The Zion Mennonite Church, which was built in Elbing in 1924, is the only church which remains in town.

Elbing grew slowly. By 1895, it had a few businesses and 50 residents. By the turn of the century, telephone service was available to the residents of Elbing on a party-line basis–four families for each telephone line. By 1910, the population had reached 100 and the town had several businesses: general store (with a post office), hardware store, implement store, bank, blacksmith shop, lumber yard, barber shop, cafe, and hotel. The town also had a doctor. Electricity did not come to Elbing until 1929 and residents had to provide their own water from wells or cisterns until the city installed a citywide water system in 1967. The city sewer system was installed in 1972. Until then, each residence had its own septic tank.

In 1919, the first of several oil wells were drilled near Elbing. As a result of the oil boom, Elbing grew dramatically for a brief time. Although the town's population increased for a few years, the new residents had little lasting effect upon the town. The oil field rapidly declined and a fire destroyed much of Elbing in 1933. Although new residences were eventually rebuilt, Elbing never regained its businesses. For several decades downtown Elbing included only a grocery/hardware store, a gas station/garage, a post office, and a grain elevator. Elbing's grocery/hardware store closed a little over a year ago. Today the garage and grain elevator are the only downtown businesses.

In 1946, Berean Academy was founded at the south end of Elbing. Although it began with fifteen students in grades nine and ten, it quickly expanded to include grades nine through twelve. By the 1970 Berean Academy had an enrollment of 300 students. Today, Berean Academy includes grades K to 12. The academy was established as a Mennonite school, but in 1966 it dropped its Mennonite distinctives to become an interdenominational Christian school. Berean Academy, probably more than any business or group of people, has sustained the life of Elbing. Although the town has several residents who are retired or are employed in nearby towns, a significant number of families reside in Elbing because of their connection to Berean Academy. Some live here because they teach at the school and others make it their home here so that their children can attend Berean Academy.

Today, Elbing has about 350 residents. It still has only three north and south streets (Main, Regier, and Johnson); and with the exception of about 20 acres (81,000 m^{2}) that were added at the south end by annexing Berean Academy, it is still 1/4 mile wide and 1/2 mile long. The area surrounding Elbing is mostly devoted to grain farming–primarily red winter wheat and sorghum grain. Nearby farms also raise a few cattle and hogs. During the last three decades, almost forty houses have been built in Elbing, so only a few of its original lots remain unoccupied. The town still has a small Post Office and is in the process of building its first fire station. Until the fire station is in operation, Elbing continues to depend upon the help of volunteer firemen and the fire protection services of nearby Newton.

In 1961, Frederic Remington High School was built immediately north of Brainerd. Leading up to this new school, Whitewater, Potwin, Brainerd, Elbing, Furley, Countryside, and Golden Gate schools merged to form Remington USD 206 public school district. Heated opposition between Whitewater and Potwin occurred during the discussion for the location of the new high school. Rural voters pushed for a centralized location in neither town. A public vote was passed to build the new school near Brainerd.

== Geography ==
According to the United States Census Bureau, the city has a total area of 0.19 square miles (0.49 km^{2}), all land.

=== Climate ===
The climate in this area is characterized by hot, humid summers and generally mild to cool winters. According to the Köppen Climate Classification system, Elbing has a humid subtropical climate, abbreviated "Cfa" on climate maps.

== Demographics ==
Historical population
Census	Pop.	Note	%±
1920	230		—
1930	110		−52.2%
1940	101		−8.2%
1950	98		−3.0%
1960	105		7.1%
1970	128		21.9%
1980	175		36.7%
1990	184		5.1%
2000	218		18.5%
2010	229		5.0%
2020	226		−1.3%
U.S. Decennial Census

In 2014, Elbing was ranked the most conservative city in Kansas.

=== 2020 census ===
The 2020 United States census counted 226 people, 77 households, and 62 families in Elbing. The population density was 1,314.0 per square mile (507.3/km^{2}). There were 77 housing units at an average density of 447.7 per square mile (172.8/km^{2}). The racial makeup was 93.81% (212) white or European American (93.81% non-Hispanic white), 0.44% (1) black or African-American, 0.0% (0) Native American or Alaska Native, 0.88% (2) Asian, 0.0% (0) Pacific Islander or Native Hawaiian, 0.0% (0) from other races, and 4.87% (11) from two or more races. Hispanic or Latino of any race was 0.88% (2) of the population.

Of the 77 households, 42.9% had children under the age of 18; 66.2% were married couples living together; 14.3% had a female householder with no spouse or partner present. 15.6% of households consisted of individuals and 6.5% had someone living alone who was 65 years of age or older. The average household size was 3.5 and the average family size was 3.9. The percent of those with a bachelor's degree or higher was estimated to be 21.2% of the population.

29.6% of the population was under the age of 18, 11.9% from 18 to 24, 19.0% from 25 to 44, 27.9% from 45 to 64, and 11.5% who were 65 years of age or older. The median age was 34.7 years. For every 100 females, there were 98.2 males. For every 100 females ages 18 and older, there were 98.8 males.

The 2016–2020 5-year American Community Survey estimates show that the median household income was $61,250 (with a margin of error of +/- $12,527) and the median family income was $68,250 (+/- $22,134). Males had a median income of $47,292 (+/- $15,784). The median income for those above 16 years old was $39,375 (+/- $10,319). Approximately, 0.0% of families and 0.6% of the population were below the poverty line, including 0.0% of those under the age of 18 and 5.3% of those ages 65 or over.

=== 2010 census ===
As of the census of 2010, there were 229 people, 73 households, and 63 families residing in the city. The population density was 1,205.3 inhabitants per square mile (465.4/km^{2}). There were 77 housing units at an average density of 405.3 per square mile (156.5/km^{2}). The racial makeup of the city was 99.6% White and 0.4% from two or more races. Hispanic or Latino of any race were 0.4% of the population.

There were 73 households, of which 47.9% had children under the age of 18 living with them, 75.3% were married couples living together, 6.8% had a female householder with no husband present, 4.1% had a male householder with no wife present, and 13.7% were non-families. 11.0% of all households were made up of individuals, and 5.5% had someone living alone who was 65 years of age or older. The average household size was 3.14 and the average family size was 3.38.

The median age in the city was 30.8 years. 36.2% of residents were under the age of 18; 4.8% were between the ages of 18 and 24; 20.5% were from 25 to 44; 21.4% were from 45 to 64; and 17% were 65 years of age or older. The gender makeup of the city was 52.0% male and 48.0% female.

=== 2000 census ===
As of the census of 2000, there were 218 people, 73 households, and 62 families residing in the city. The population density was 1,275.0 inhabitants per square mile (492.3/km^{2}). There were 77 housing units at an average density of 450.3 per square mile (173.9/km^{2}). The racial makeup of the city was 94.95% White, 2.75% African American, and 2.29% from two or more races. Hispanic or Latino of any race were 2.75% of the population.

There were 73 households, out of which 43.8% had children under the age of 18 living with them, 79.5% were married couples living together, 5.5% had a female householder with no husband present, and 13.7% were non-families. 11.0% of all households were made up of individuals, and 6.8% had someone living alone who was 65 years of age or older. The average household size was 2.99 and the average family size was 3.27.

In the city, the population was spread out, with 35.8% under the age of 18, 3.2% from 18 to 24, 22.9% from 25 to 44, 18.3% from 45 to 64, and 19.7% who were 65 years of age or older. The median age was 38 years. For every 100 females, there were 98.2 males. For every 100 females age 18 and over, there were 89.2 males.

The median income for a household in the city was $45,417, and the median income for a family was $49,375. Males had a median income of $40,750 versus $16,250 for females. The per capita income for the city was $16,513. None of the families and 0.8% of the population were living below the poverty line.

== Government ==
The Elbing consists of a mayor and five council members. The council meets once a month.

- City Hall, 215 Main St.

== Education ==
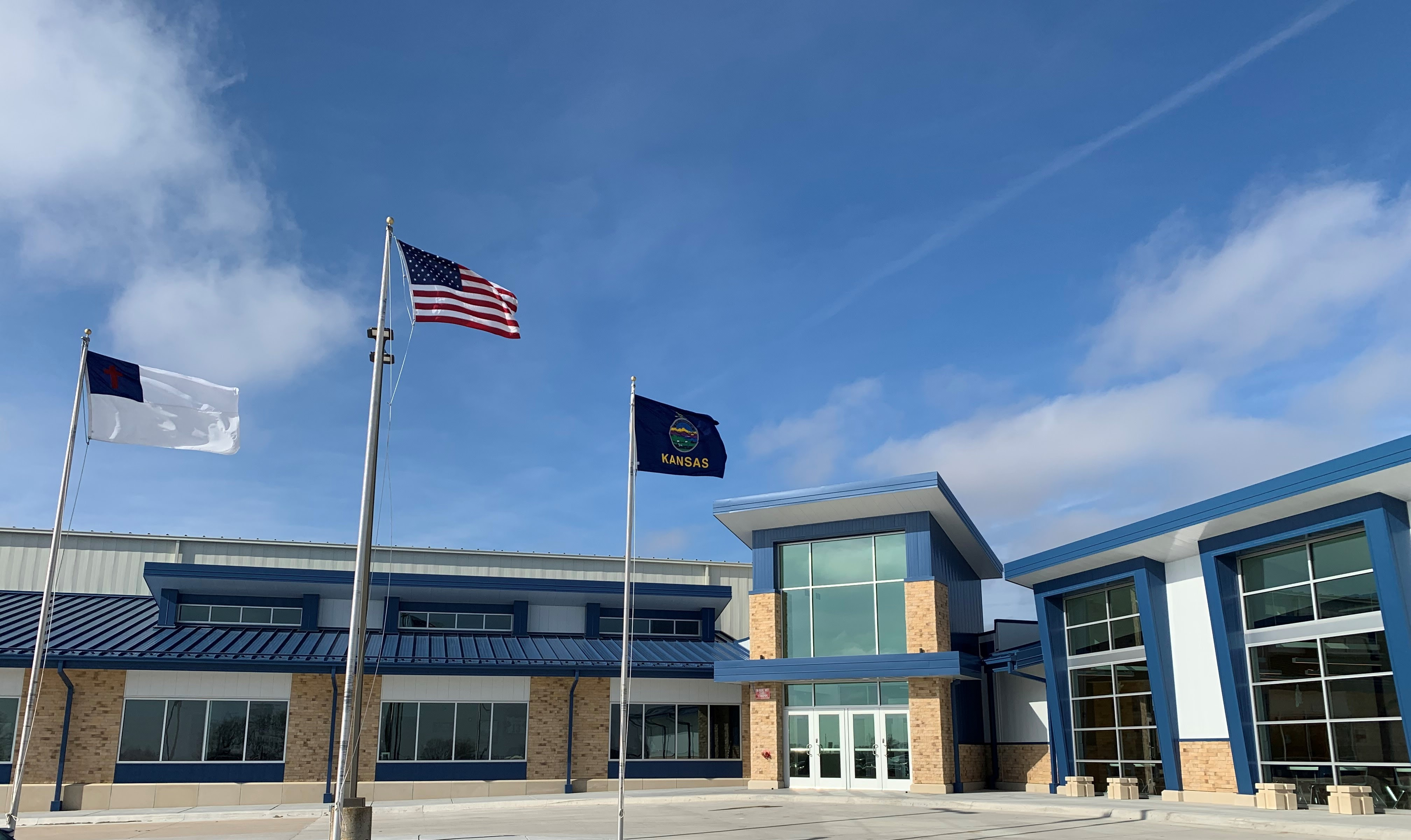
Berean Academy (2023)

=== Primary and secondary ===
The community is served by Remington USD 206 public school district. The Remington High School mascot is a Bronco.

- Frederic Remington High School north of Brainerd.
- Remington Middle School in Whitewater.
- Remington Elementary School in Potwin.

Elbing is home to a private school:

- Berean Academy, 201 South Elbing Road in Elbing.

== Media ==
=== Print ===
- The Newton Kansan, regional newspaper from Newton.
- The Wichita Eagle, major regional newspaper from Wichita.

=== Radio ===
Elbing is served by numerous radio stations of the Wichita-Hutchinson listening market area, and satellite radio. See Media in Wichita, Kansas.

=== Television ===
Elbing is served by over-the-air ATSC digital TV of the Wichita-Hutchinson viewing market area, cable TV, and satellite TV. See Media in Wichita, Kansas.

== Infrastructure ==
=== Transportation ===
The Oklahoma Kansas Texas (OKT) line of the Union Pacific Railroad runs north–south through the east side of the city. Elbing had a depot when the city was founded but was removed in the 1970s.

The Chicago, Rock Island and Pacific Railroad formerly provided passenger rail service to Elbing on their mainline from Minneapolis to Houston until at least 1951. As of 2025, the nearest passenger rail station is located in Newton, where Amtrak's Southwest Chief stops once daily on a route from Chicago to Los Angeles.

== See also ==
- Fairmount Township, Butler County, Kansas (location of Elbing)
