= Midian (disambiguation) =

Midian is a geographical place and a people mentioned in the Bible and Qur'an, located in modern Al-Bad' in Tabuk Region, Hejaz.

Midian may also refer to:

- Midian, son of Abraham, fourth son of Biblical patriarch Abraham by Keturah
- Midian, Kansas, a community in the United States
- Midian (album) (2000) by Cradle of Filth
- Midian, a mythical city in Clive Barker's novella Cabal and the inspiration for Cradle of Filth's album
  - Midian, a mythical city in the film Nightbreed, based on Clive Barker's novella, Cabal
