= Hattie Horner Louthan =

American writer

Hattie Horner Louthan (1865 – 1950) was an American writer. She was the author of five books and contributed to newspapers and magazines.

== Early years and education ==
Hattie Horner was born at Muscatine, Iowa, (Note: Quincy, Illinois is also reported.) but lived nearly all her life in Whitewater, Butler County, Kansas. She was a graduate of her town's high school, as well as of the class of 1883 of the Kansas State Normal School, Emporia, Kansas.

== Career ==
Louthan taught for five years, and served as principal of the Arkansas City and El Dorado high schools.

She was editor of The Great Southwest: A Monthly Journal of Horticulture (San Diego, California) and a member of the staff of the Denver Republican (Denver, Colorado). Her first volume of poems came out in 1885; the next year, "Some Reasons For Our Choice." "Not At Home," a book of travels, was published in 1889; "Collection of Kansas Poetry," in 1891; and "Thoughts Adrift," in 1902. State fame came to her when her "Kansas: 1874-1884" was published. It was written as the last train for the relief of the Ohio flood sufferers left the depot at El Dorado, aud was a comparison between the grasshopper year and the present time of plenty. It was through the medium of her "Letters" written while traveling for her health during vacation, and comprising four series, from Wisconsin, New Orleans, Colorado, New Mexico and California. While engaged in writing these letters, the Kansas Publishing House issued the first volume of poems; it was successful. In January, 1889, her "Letters" were published in book form, under the suggestive title of "Not at Home."

== Personal life ==
Louthan was member of the Authors' and Artists' Club of Kansas. She married Overton Earl Louthan (1868-1906). She died in 1950 and is buried at Brainerd Cemetery, Brainerd, Kansas.

The Hattie Horner Louthan Collection is held by the Emporia State University Special Collections and Archives.
