= Butler County Times-Gazette =

American daily newspaper

The Butler County Times-Gazette
- Type: Daily newspaper
- Owner(s): CherryRoad Media
- Editor: Charles Chaney (sports)
- Founded: December 1, 1919
- Headquarters: 114 North Vine Street, El Dorado, Kansas 67042, U.S.
- ISSN: 2835-4575
- Website: butlercountytimesgazette.com

The Butler County Times-Gazette is an American daily newspaper published in El Dorado, Kansas. The paper covers several communities in northern and eastern Butler County, Kansas, part of the Wichita metropolitan area. In addition to El Dorado, The Times-Gazette's coverage area includes Benton, Leon, Potwin, Towanda and Whitewater.

== History ==
The Times-Gazette was founded in 1919 through the merger of two competing El Dorado dailies, the El Dorado Republican (founded May 5, 1885) and the Walnut Valley Times (founded March 4, 1870, daily since March 1, 1887).

GateHouse Media merged the operations of the Times-Gazette with the Andover American and Augusta Daily Gazette. The publication was renamed from the El Dorado Times to the Butler County Times-Gazette.

Gannett sold the paper in 2021 to CherryRoad Media.

== See also ==
- List of newspapers in Kansas
