= Jordan Phillips =

American football player (born 1992)

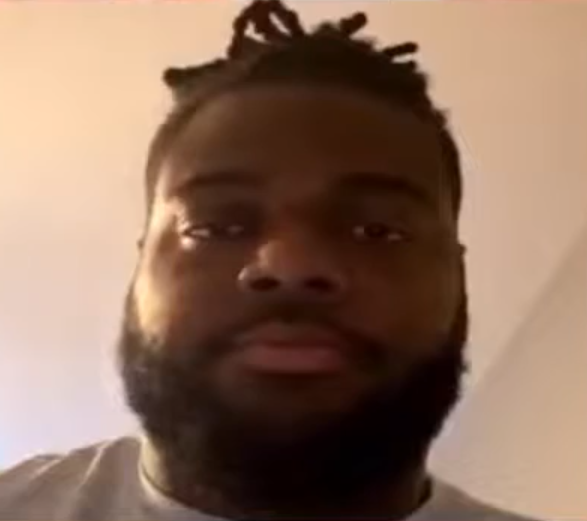
- Phillips in 2019

Profile
- Position: Defensive tackle

Personal information
- Born: September 21, 1992 (age 34); Wichita, Kansas, U.S.
- Listed height: 6 ft 6 in (1.98 m)
- Listed weight: 341 lb (155 kg)

Career information
- High school: Circle (Towanda, Kansas)
- College: Oklahoma (2011–2014)
- NFL draft: 2015: 2nd round, 52nd overall pick

Career history
- Miami Dolphins (2015–2018); Buffalo Bills (2018–2019); Arizona Cardinals (2020–2021); Buffalo Bills (2022–2023); New York Giants (2024)*; Dallas Cowboys (2024); Buffalo Bills (2024–2025)
- * Offseason or practice squad member only

Awards and highlights
- Second-team All-Big 12 (2014)

Career NFL statistics as of 2025
- Total tackles: 196
- Sacks: 25
- Forced fumbles: 3
- Fumble recoveries: 2
- Pass deflections: 26
- Interceptions: 2
- Stats at Pro Football Reference

Jordan Phillips (born September 21, 1992) is an American professional football defensive tackle. He played college football for the Oklahoma Sooners and was selected by the Miami Dolphins in the second round of the 2015 NFL draft. He has played for the Arizona Cardinals, New York Giants, Dallas Cowboys, and three separate stints with the Buffalo Bills.

== Early life ==
Phillips attended Circle High School in Towanda, Kansas, where he played high school football. He was rated by Scout.com as a five-star recruit and Rivals.com as a four-star. He committed to the University of Oklahoma to play college football.

== College career ==
Phillips played at Oklahoma from 2011 to 2014. As a freshman in 2011, he was redshirted. As a redshirt freshman in 2012, he appeared in 12 games, recording 12 tackles. Phillips played in only four games his sophomore season in 2013 due to a back injury. He had seven tackles and 1.5 sacks before the injury. Phillips returned from the injury in 2014. He finished the year with 31 tackles and two sacks.

After his junior season, Phillips entered the 2015 NFL draft.

== Professional career ==
Pre-draft measurables
Height	Weight	Arm length	Hand span	40-yard dash	10-yard split	20-yard split	20-yard shuttle	Three-cone drill	Vertical jump	Broad jump	Bench press
6 ft 5 1/4 in (1.96 m)	329 lb (149 kg)	34 3/4 in (0.88 m)	9 3/8 in (0.24 m)	5.17 s	1.82 s	3.01 s	4.68 s	7.88 s	30 in (0.76 m)	8 ft 9 in (2.67 m)	28 reps
All values from NFL Combine

=== Miami Dolphins ===
Phillips was selected by the Miami Dolphins in the second round with the 52nd overall pick of the 2015 NFL draft. During his rookie year, Phillips played 15 games, making 19 tackles, 2 sacks, and 4 passes defended.

Phillips entered the 2018 season as a starting defensive tackle. However his playing time dipped as the season progressed, leading to an outburst on the sideline about his playing time in a Week 4 blowout loss to the New England Patriots. On October 2, 2018, Phillips was waived by the Dolphins.

=== Buffalo Bills (first stint) ===
On October 3, 2018, Phillips was claimed off waivers by the Buffalo Bills.

On March 4, 2019, Phillips re-signed with the Bills. In Week 5 against the Tennessee Titans, Phillips sacked Marcus Mariota three times in the 14–7 win. Phillips emerged as a premier pass rusher for the Bills, racking up 9.5 sacks in the 2019 season.

=== Arizona Cardinals ===
On April 6, 2020, Phillips signed a three–year contract with the Arizona Cardinals.

In Week 2 against the Washington Football Team, Phillips recorded his first sack as a Cardinal, a strip sack on Dwayne Haskins which was recovered by teammate Chandler Jones during the 30–15 win. In Week 6 against the Dallas Cowboys on Monday Night Football, Phillips recovered a fumble lost by running back Ezekiel Elliott and forced a fumble on Elliott on the Cowboys' next drive of the game during the 38–10 win. He was placed on injured reserve on November 19, 2020, with a hamstring injury. He was activated on December 12, 2020. He aggravated the hamstring injury in Week 14 and was placed on injured reserve on December 19, ending his season.

On September 2, 2021, Phillips was placed on injured reserve to start the season. He was activated on October 16.

On March 16, 2022, Phillips was released by the Cardinals.

=== Buffalo Bills (second stint) ===
On March 17, 2022, Phillips signed with the Bills on a one-year deal. Following the year, Phillips revealed he had played the last few weeks of the season with a torn rotator cuff, and would undergo offseason surgery.

Phillips re-signed with the Bills on April 6, 2023. He was placed on the active/physically unable to perform list on July 25. Phillips was activated on August 6. He finished the season with 15 tackles, 2.5 sacks, and a career-high five passes defensed through 14 games and nine starts.

=== New York Giants ===
On April 11, 2024, Phillips signed with the New York Giants.

=== Dallas Cowboys ===
On August 14, 2024, the Giants traded Phillips and a 2026 seventh-round pick (No. 221, traded to the Cincinnati Bengals) to the Dallas Cowboys in exchange for a 2026 sixth-round pick (No. 193: Jack Kelly) . On November 5, Phillips was released by the Cowboys.

=== Buffalo Bills (third stint) ===
On November 6, 2024, Phillips was signed by the Buffalo Bills. He made seven appearances for Buffalo, recording one interception, one pass deflection, and five combined tackles.

On August 25, 2025, Phillips re-signed with the Bills but was released the following day as part of final roster cuts. He was then signed to the practice squad the next day. On October 28, Phillips was signed to the active roster.

== NFL career statistics ==
Legend
**Bold**	Career high

=== Regular season ===
Year	Team	Games		Tackles							Interceptions						Fumbles				
Year	Team	GP	GS	Cmb	Solo	Ast	TFL	QBH	Sck	Sfty	PD	Int	Yds	Y/I	Lng	TD	FF	FR	Yds	Y/R	TD
2015	MIA	15	4	19	14	5	2	5	2.0	0	4	0	0	—	0	0	0	0	0	—	0
2016	MIA	16	11	23	13	10	5	3	0.5	0	3	**1**	**17**	**17.0**	**17**	0	0	0	0	—	0
2017	MIA	13	11	16	10	6	4	6	2.0	0	3	0	0	—	0	0	0	0	0	—	0
2018	MIA	4	0	5	3	2	1	3	1.0	0	1	0	0	—	0	0	0	0	0	—	0
2018	BUF	12	0	19	12	7	2	0	0.0	0	3	0	0	—	0	0	0	**1**	0	**0.0**	0
2019	BUF	16	9	**31**	**25**	6	**13**	**16**	**9.5**	0	0	0	0	—	0	0	1	0	0	—	0
2020	ARI	9	9	11	10	1	1	3	2.0	0	1	0	0	—	0	0	**2**	**1**	0	**0.0**	0
2021	ARI	9	8	22	14	8	3	4	3.0	0	2	0	0	—	0	0	0	0	0	—	0
2022	BUF	12	1	20	9	**11**	3	6	1.5	0	2	0	0	—	0	0	0	0	0	—	0
2023	BUF	14	9	15	10	5	2	5	2.5	0	**5**	0	0	—	0	0	0	0	0	—	0
2024	DAL	2	0	1	0	1	0	1	0.0	0	0	0	0	—	0	0	0	0	0	—	0
2024	BUF	9	0	5	4	1	0	1	0.0	0	1	**1**	2	2.0	2	0	0	0	0	—	0
2025	BUF	11	1	9	5	4	2	1	1.0	0	1	0	0	—	0	0	0	0	0	—	0
Career		140	63	196	129	67	38	54	25.0	0	26	2	19	9.5	17	0	3	2	0	0.0	0

=== Postseason ===
Year	Team	Games		Tackles							Interceptions						Fumbles				
Year	Team	GP	GS	Cmb	Solo	Ast	TFL	QBH	Sck	Sfty	PD	Int	Yds	Y/I	Lng	TD	FF	FR	Yds	Y/R	TD
2016	MIA	1	1	**3**	**2**	1	**2**	0	0.0	0	0	0	0	—	0	0	0	0	0	—	0
2019	BUF	1	1	0	0	0	0	**1**	0.0	0	0	0	0	—	0	0	0	0	0	—	0
2022	BUF	1	0	1	1	0	0	0	0.0	0	0	0	0	—	0	0	0	0	0	—	0
2024	BUF	3	0	**3**	1	**2**	1	**1**	**1.0**	0	0	0	0	—	0	0	0	0	0	—	0
2025	BUF	Did not play due to injury																			
Career		6	2	7	4	3	3	2	1.0	0	0	0	0	—	0	0	0	0	0	—	0
