= K-196 (Kansas highway) =

State highway in Kansas, U.S.

K-196
- K-196 highlighted in red

Route information
- Maintained by KDOT
- Length: 28.474 mi (45.824 km)
- Existed: March 29, 1937–present

Major junctions
- West end: I-135 / US-81 / K-15 south of Newton
- East end: K-254 in El Dorado

Location
- Country: United States
- State: Kansas
- Counties: Harvey, Butler

Highway system
- Kansas State Highway System; Interstate; US; State; Spurs
← K-195	→ K-197

K-196 is a 28.474-mile-long (45.824 km) east–west state highway in Harvey and Butler Counties in the U.S. state of Kansas. K-196's western terminus is at Interstate 135 (I-135), U.S. Route 81 (US-81) and K-15 just south of Newton and the eastern terminus is at K-254 just east of El Dorado, Kansas. The highway runs along the south border the town of Whitewater and bypasses Potwin to the south.

K-196 was first established as a state highway on March 29, 1937, and at that time ran from US-81 and K-15 south of Newton to US-54 and US-77 in El Dorado. Then between 1957 and 1968, K-254 was extended along K-196 through El Dorato to US-54 and US-77. The overlap with K-254 was removed on May 6, 1994, and K-196 was truncated to end at K-254 west of El Dorado.

== Route description ==
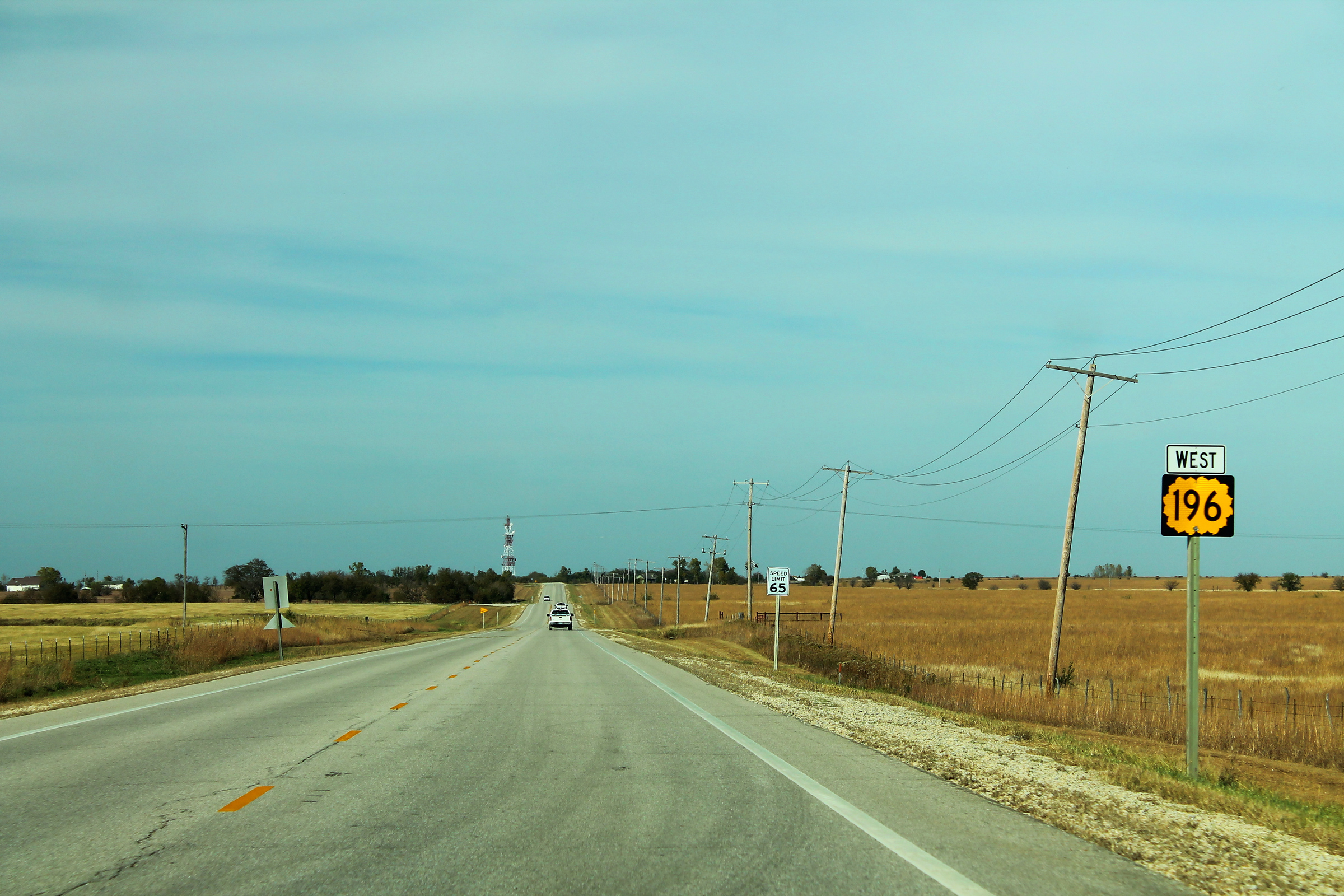
K-196 westbound

K-196 begins at a diamond interchange with I-135 exit 25, which is co-designated as US-81 and K-15. It begins heading east through rural farmlands as it crosses Jester Creek. About three miles (4.8 km) past here it crosses West Wildcat Creek at South Woodlawn Road. Another two miles (3.2 km) east it crosses Wildcat Creek at Webb Road. About 1.9 miles (3.1 km) east from here, K-196 crosses Gypsum Creek. The highway then passes north of Whitewater Cemetery, crosses U.P. S.Y.S Railroad, then crosses into Butler County. As K-196 enters the county, it passes south of Whitewater, and then curves east-southeastward. It then passes by Brainerd and soon crosses Dry Creek, then Whitewater River about one mile (1.6 km) later. The highway then curves east as it passes south of Potwin. Past Potwin, K-196 curves to a more southeast direction, then crosses Fourmile Creek. Just over 1.5 miles (2.4 km) past Fourmile Creek, it crosses Rock Creek. After another 1.3 miles (2.1 km) it curves south as it passes to the west of Baker Cemetery. After curving south it continues roughly four miles (6.4 km), then curves southeast for one mile (1.6 km) then ends at a diamond interchange with K-254 west of El Dorado, near I-35/Kansas Turnpike.

The Kansas Department of Transportation (KDOT) tracks the traffic levels on its highways, and in 2018, they determined that on average the traffic varied from 1430 vehicles near Potwin, 2280 vehicles near the western terminus, to 2380 vehicles near the eastern terminus. K-196 is not included in the National Highway System. The National Highway System is a system of highways important to the nation's defense, economy, and mobility. K-196 does connect to the National Highway System at each terminus. As of 2017, the portion of the route in Harvey County is paved with partial design bituminous pavement and the portion of the route in Butler County is paved with full design bituminous pavement.

== History ==
=== Early roads ===
Before state highways were numbered in Kansas there were auto trails, which were an informal network of marked routes that existed in the United States and Canada in the early part of the 20th century. K-196's western terminus (I-135, US-81, K-15) closely follows the Meridian Highway and South West Trail. The former eastern terminus (US-77, US-54) was part of the Atlantic and Pacific Highway, Fort Scott Wichita Road and Kansas-Oklahoma-Texas Highway.

=== Establishment and realignments ===
K-196 Alternate
- Location: El Dorado
- Length: 1.190 mi (1.915 km)
- Existed: October 8, 1958–c. 1978

K-196 was first established as a state highway on March 29, 1937, by the State Highway Commission of Kansas, now known as Kansas Department of Transportation (KDOT). In an April 10, 1946 resolution, K-196 was slightly realigned in Butler County northwest of El Dorado. Before mid 1953, K-196 followed the railroad through Oil Hill, then in a May 19, 1953 resolution, K-196 was moved slightly southwest to a new alignment. By June 1957, Butler county had finished projects on the new K-254 and in a June 26, 1957 resolution, it was established as a state highway from the Sedgwick–Butler County line to K-196 west of El Dorado. Then sometime between June 26, 1957, and 1968, K-254 was extended along K-196 through El Dorato to US-54 and US-77. In an October 8, 1958 resolution, K-196 Alternate (K-196 Alt.) was created on the west end of El Dorado. In a January 27, 1967 resolution it was approved to build I-35W from the Sedgewick–Harvey County line north to the Harvey–McPherson County line and then realign K-15 and US-81 onto I-35W. Then by 1970, I-35W was built and K-196 was truncated .479 miles (0.771 km) to it current western terminus. I-35W was remembered to I-135 on September 13, 1976. Then sometime between 1975 and 1981, K-196 Alt. was decommissioned. The overlap with K-254 was removed on May 6, 1994, and K-196 was truncated to end at K-254 west of El Dorado.

== Major intersections ==
County	Location	mi	km	Destinations	Notes
Harvey	Darlington Township	0.000	0.000	I-135 / US-81 / K-15 – Wichita, Salina	Western terminus; I-135 exit 25; diamond interchange; road continues as SE 72nd Street
Butler	El Dorado	28.474	45.824	K-254 to I-35 / Kansas Turnpike – El Dorado, Wichita	Eastern terminus; diamond interchange; road continues as SW Purity Springs Road
1.000 mi = 1.609 km; 1.000 km = 0.621 mi
