= Circle USD 375 =

School district in Towanda, Kansas

Address
- 901 Main St. Towanda, Kansas, 67144; United States
- Coordinates: 37°47′43″N 96°59′45″W

District information
- Type: Public
- Grades: K to 12
- Superintendent: Don Potter
- Schools: 6

Students and staff
- Students: 1,916

Other information
- Website: usd375.org

Circle USD 375 is a public unified school district headquartered in Towanda, Kansas, United States. The district includes the communities of Towanda, Benton, Greenwich, Midian, western El Dorado, eastern Bel Aire, and nearby rural areas.

== Schools ==
The school district has six schools:

- Circle High School
- Circle Middle School
- Circle Benton Elementary School
- Circle Greenwich Elementary School
- Circle Oil Hill Elementary School
- Circle Towanda Elementary School

== See also ==
- Kansas State Department of Education
- Kansas State High School Activities Association
- List of high schools in Kansas
- List of unified school districts in Kansas
