= Towanda Masonic Lodge No. 30 A.F. and A.M. =

- U.S. National Register of Historic Places
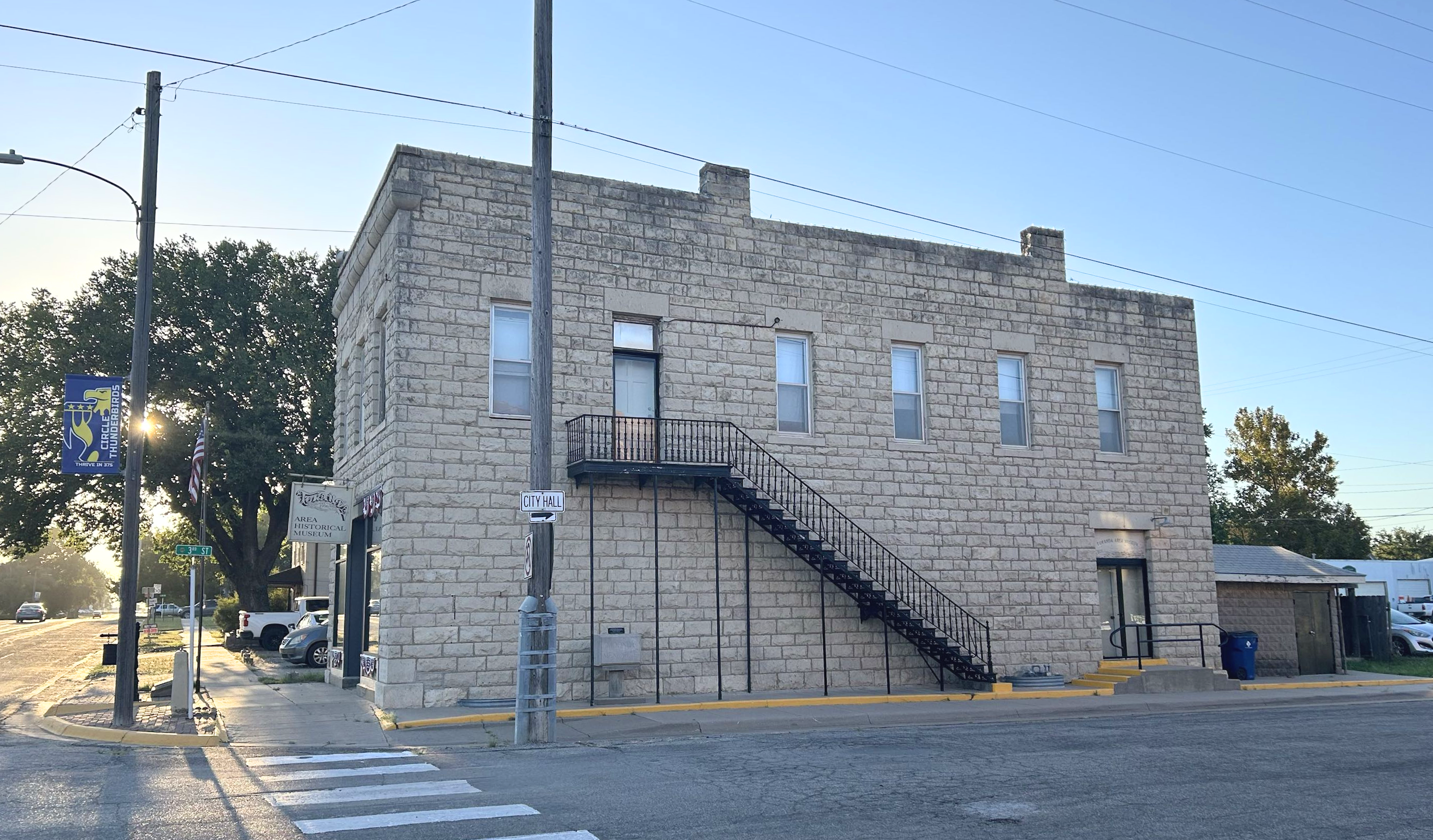
- The building in 2026

- Location within Kansas Location within the United States
- Location: 401 Main St., Towanda, Kansas
- Coordinates: 37°47′44″N 97°0′9″W
- Area: Less than one acre
- Built: 1904
- Architect: Reed, T.R.
- Architectural style: Late 19th and Early 20th Century American Movements
- NRHP reference No.: 03001392
- Added to NRHP: January 14, 2004

Towanda Masonic Lodge No. 30 A.F. and A.M. is a historic building located in Towanda, Kansas, built in 1904. It was listed on the National Register of Historic Places in 2004.

Originally constructed by Towanda Lodge No. 30 (which no longer exists), the building was used as a meeting hall until 1996, when it was sold to the City of Towanda and converted into a local history museum, the "Towanda Area Historical Museum".
