= Oak Lawn Farm Dairy Barn =

- U.S. National Register of Historic Places
- Location within Kansas Location within the United States
- Nearest city: Whitewater, Kansas
- Coordinates: 38°0′24″N 97°5′46″W
- Area: less than one acre
- Built: 1926
- Built by: Wiens, Bill; Wiebe, Jacob
- Architectural style: Late Gothic Revival
- NRHP reference No.: 05001202
- Added to NRHP: November 5, 2005

Oak Lawn Farm Dairy Barn is a historic Gothic-arch barn building northeast of Whitewater, Kansas, United States. It was built in a Late Gothic Revival style in 1926 and was added to the National Register of Historic Places in 2005. It was deemed "an excellent example of an early twentieth century, bent-rafter gothic roof style barn."

It is an L-shaped wooden barn with a rounded roof, and is about 80 by 60 feet (24 m × 18 m) in plan.
