= Circle High School (Towanda, Kansas) =

Public high school in Towanda, Kansas, United States

Coordinates: 37.7949°N 96.9935°W

Location
- 905 Main Street; Towanda, (Butler County), Kansas 67144; United States

Information
- Type: Public high school
- School district: Circle USD 375
- Principal: Matthew Carroll
- Staff: 31.80 (FTE)
- Enrollment: 605 (2023-24)
- Student to teacher ratio: 19.03
- Colors: Blue and gold
- Nickname: Thunderbirds
- Website: Circle High School

Circle High School is a public high school in Towanda, Kansas, United States, and located at 905 Main Street. It is operated by Circle USD 375 school district. The school mascot is the Thunderbird. Blue and gold are the school colors.

== History ==
In 2013 a bond measure passed to build a new high school building to expand the 1962 building. The school's population outgrew that building.

In 2025, Mom's Pantry, a food charity, started at the school.

In 2025, the school had 605 students in grades 9-12, and a 90 percent graduation rate.

== Notable alumni ==
- Jordan Phillips, football player

== See also ==
- List of high schools in Kansas
- List of unified school districts in Kansas
