= Remington USD 206 =

Public school district in Whitewater, Kansas

Address
- 110 S. Main St. Whitewater, Kansas, 67154; United States
- Coordinates: 37°57′48″N 97°8′56″W

District information
- Type: Public
- Grades: PK to 12
- School board: 7 members
- Schools: 3
- NCES District ID: 2006240

Students and staff
- Students: 511 (2023–24)
- Teachers: 39.25 (on an FTE basis)
- Student–teacher ratio: 13.02

Other information
- Website: www.usd206.org

Remington USD 206 is a public unified school district headquartered in Whitewater, Kansas, United States. Depending on the historic use, it may also have the word "Whitewater" either before or after "Remington". The district includes the communities of Whitewater, Potwin, Brainerd, Elbing, Furley, and nearby rural areas in Butler, Harvey, Sedgwick counties.

== History ==
In 1945, the School Reorganization Act in Kansas caused the consolidation of thousands of rural school districts in Kansas. In 1963, the School Unification Act in Kansas caused the further consolidatation of thousands of tiny school districts into hundreds of larger Unified School Districts.

In 1961, Whitewater, Potwin, Brainerd, Elbing, Furley, Countryside, and Golden Gate schools merged to form a joint rural high school. Heated opposition between Whitewater and Potwin occurred during the discussion for the location of the new high school. Rural voters pushed for a centralized location in neither town. A public vote was taken to determine if the school should be built halfway between Whitewater and Potwin, near Brainerd, which passed 745 "yes" to 155 "no". A contest was held to find a unique name for the new high school, which was chosen to honor the famous American Old West artist Frederic Remington who lived about 4 miles north near Plum Grove in the 1880s.

== Schools ==
The school district operates the following schools:

- Frederic Remington High School at 8850 NW Meadowlark Road, north of Brainerd.
- Remington Middle School at 316 E Topeka Street in Whitewater.
- Remington Elementary School at 200 E Ellis Avenue in Potwin.

== See also ==
- List of high schools in Kansas
- List of unified school districts in Kansas
- Kansas State Department of Education
- Kansas State High School Activities Association
