= Frederic Remington High School =

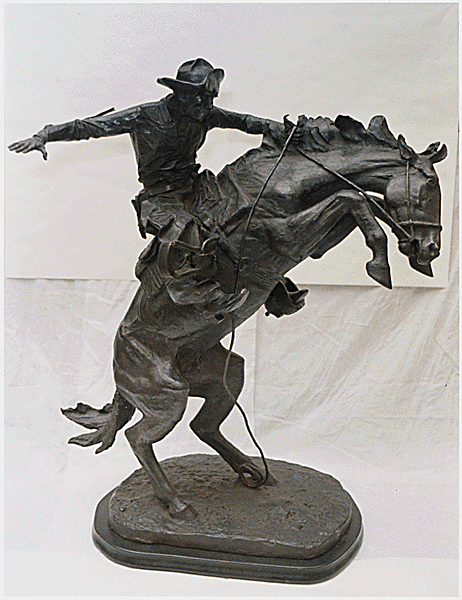
- The Broncho Buster by Frederic Remington, 1909

Location
- 8850 Northwest Meadowlark Road; Whitewater, Kansas 67154; United States; 37.955074°N 97.094739°W

Information
- School type: Public, High School
- School board: Board Website
- School district: Remington USD 206
- CEEB code: 173155
- NCES School ID: 200624000042
- Principal: James O'Brien
- Staff: 14.08 (on an FTE basis)
- Grades: 9 to 12
- Gender: coed
- Enrollment: 162 (2023–2024)
- Student to teacher ratio: 11.51
- Campus type: rural
- Colors: Blue; Silver
- Athletics: Class 2A, District 9
- Athletics conference: Heart of America
- Mascot: Bronco
- Rival: Berean Warriors
- Communities served: Whitewater, Potwin, Brainerd, Elbing, Furley
- Website: rhs.usd206.org/rhs

Frederic Remington High School is a public secondary school in rural Butler County, Kansas between the cities of Whitewater and Potwin. It is located north of K-196 highway, along the north side of the unincorporated community of Brainerd and southeast of the intersection of NW Meadowlark Rd and NW 90th St. It is one of three schools operated by Remington USD 206 public school district. This school is also commonly known as Remington High School as the shorter name, and Whitewater-Remington High School on KSHSAA sport lists.

== History ==
In 1961, Whitewater, Potwin, Brainerd, Elbing, Furley, Countryside, and Golden Gate schools merged to form a joint rural high school. Heated opposition between Whitewater and Potwin occurred during the discussion for the location of the new high school. Rural voters pushed for a centralized location in neither town. A public vote was taken to determine if the school should be built halfway between Whitewater and Potwin, near Brainerd, which passed 745 "yes" to 155 "no". A contest was held to find a unique name for the new high school, which was chosen to honor the famous American Old West artist Frederic Remington who lived about 4 miles north in the 1880s. USD 206 covers an area of 253 square miles (660 km^{2}) in Butler, Harvey, and Sedgwick counties.

In 2006, the Remington Rock monument was built near the high school.

== Extracurricular activities ==
The Broncos compete in the Heart of America League. The KSHSAA classification is 2A. The school also has a variety of organizations for the students to participate in.

=== Athletics ===
The Broncos compete in the Heart of America League and are classified as a 2A school, except in football, where Remington is classified in 1A. Frederic Remington High School offers the following sports:

Fall Sports

- Cross Country
- Football
- Volleyball

Winter

- Basketball
- Wrestling

Spring

- Baseball / Softball
- Golf
- Track and Field

=== Organizations ===
- Debate and Forensics
- Family, Career and Community Leaders of America (FCCLA)
- International Club
- National Forensics League
- Scholars' Bowl
- Science Club
- Student Council (STUCO)
- Table Top Gaming Club
- Thespians/Drama
- Young Adults Advisory Council to the Library (YAACL)
- Skills USA
- Cheerleading

== Notable alumni ==
Former Whitewater High School

- Hattie Louthan (1865–1950), writer, author of five books and contributed to newspapers and magazines.

== See also ==
- List of high schools in Kansas
- List of unified school districts in Kansas
