= Whitewater, Kansas =

City in Butler County, Kansas

- City
- Location within Butler County and Kansas

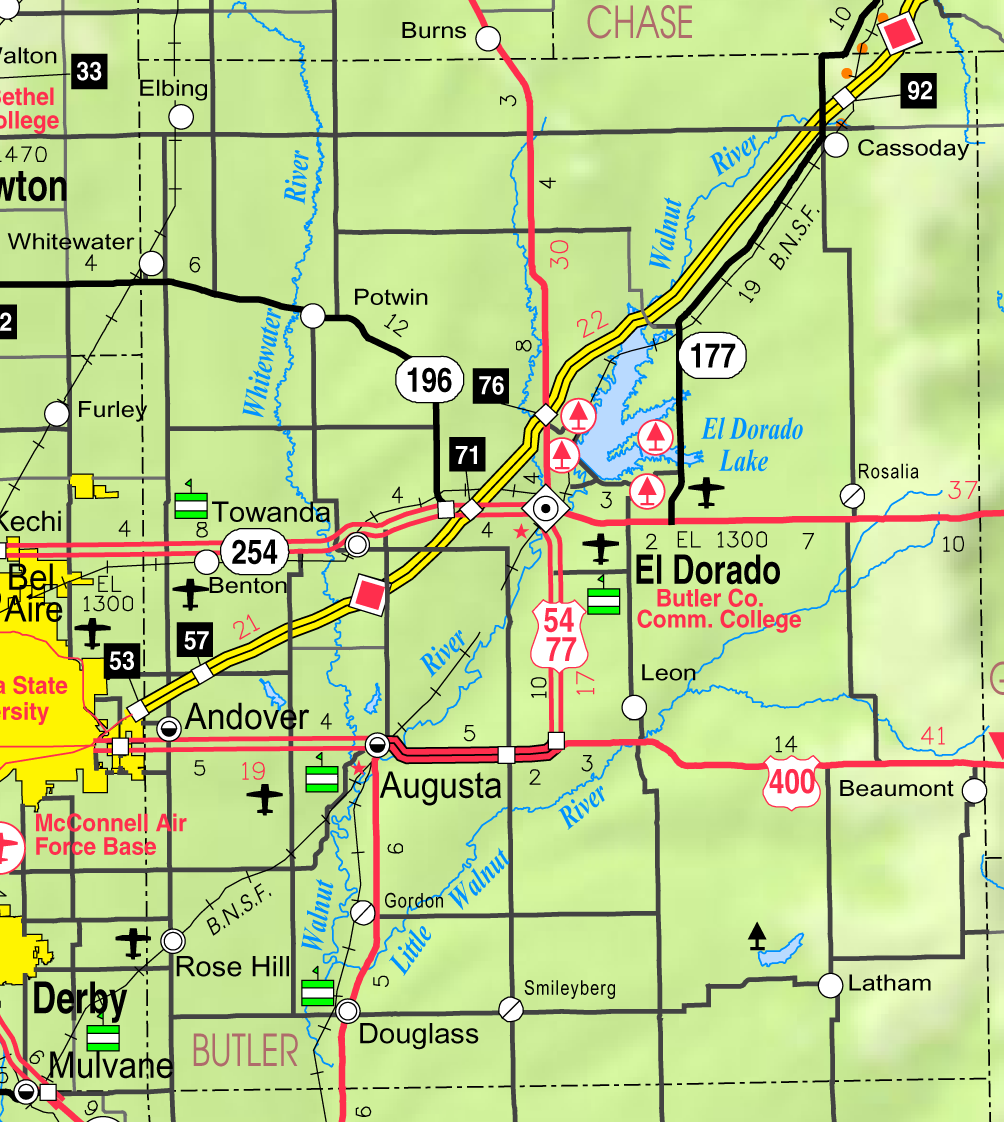
- KDOT map of Butler County (legend)
- Coordinates: 37°57′49″N 97°08′46″W
- Country: United States
- State: Kansas
- County: Butler
- Founded: 1870s
- Platted: 1885
- Incorporated: 1890

Government
  - Type: Mayor–Council
  - Mayor: Tim Eldredge

Area
  - Total: 0.41 sq mi (1.06 km^{2})
  - Land: 0.41 sq mi (1.06 km^{2})
  - Water: 0 sq mi (0.00 km^{2})
- Elevation: 1,365 ft (416 m)

Population (2020)
  - Total: 661
  - Density: 1,620/sq mi (624/km^{2})
- Time zone: UTC-6 (CST)
  - Summer (DST): UTC-5 (CDT)
- ZIP Code: 67154
- Area code: 316
- FIPS code: 20-78050
- GNIS ID: 2397303
- Website: whitewaterks.gov

Whitewater is a city in Butler County, Kansas, United States. As of the 2020 census, the population of the city was 661.

== History ==
=== Early history ===
For many millennia, the Great Plains of North America were inhabited by nomadic Native Americans. From the 16th century to 18th century, the Kingdom of France claimed ownership of large parts of North America. In 1762, after the French and Indian War, France secretly ceded New France to Spain, per the Treaty of Fontainebleau.

=== 19th century ===
In 1802, Spain returned most of the land to France. In 1803, most of the land for modern day Kansas was acquired by the United States from France as part of the 828,000 square mile Louisiana Purchase for 2.83 cents per acre.

In 1854, the Kansas Territory was organized, then in 1861 Kansas became the 34th U.S. state. In 1855, Butler County was established within the Kansas Territory, which included the land for modern day Whitewater.

The city originally formed several miles to the east. A post office was established as White Water (as two words) on August 7, 1871. The post office was renamed to Ovo on July 7, 1882.

In 1887, the Chicago, Kansas and Nebraska Railway built a branch line north–south from Herington through Whitewater to Caldwell. It foreclosed in 1891 and was taken over by Chicago, Rock Island and Pacific Railway, which shut down in 1980 and reorganized as Oklahoma, Kansas and Texas Railroad, merged in 1988 with Missouri Pacific Railroad, merged in 1997 with Union Pacific Railroad. Most locals still refer to this railroad as the "Rock Island".

Between 1885 and 1888, several buildings were moved to the present location on the Whitewater River after the Missouri Pacific railroad came through the area. The city was established where the Missouri Pacific and Rock Island railroads intersected. The post office was renamed to White Water on May 15, 1888.

=== 20th century ===
The historic Oak Lawn Farm Dairy Barn was built near Whitewater in 1926.

On November 1, 1950, the post office name was changed to Whitewater (one word).

In 1961, Frederic Remington High School was built immediately north of Brainerd. Leading up to this new school, Whitewater, Potwin, Brainerd, Elbing, Furley, Countryside, and Golden Gate schools merged to form a joint rural high school. Heated opposition between Whitewater and Potwin occurred during the discussion for the location of the new high school. Rural voters pushed for a centralized location in neither town. A public vote was passed to build the new school near Brainerd.

== Geography ==
Whitewater is located along the West Branch of the Whitewater River.

According to the United States Census Bureau, the city has a total area of 0.40 square miles (1.04 km^{2}), all land.

== Demographics ==
Historical population
| Census | Pop. | Note | %± |
|---|---|---|---|
| 1890 | 184 | | — |
| 1900 | 267 | | 45.1% |
| 1910 | 518 | | 94.0% |
| 1920 | 556 | | 7.3% |
| 1930 | 556 | | 0.0% |
| 1940 | 515 | | −7.4% |
| 1950 | 453 | | −12.0% |
| 1960 | 499 | | 10.2% |
| 1970 | 520 | | 4.2% |
| 1980 | 751 | | 44.4% |
| 1990 | 683 | | −9.1% |
| 2000 | 653 | | −4.4% |
| 2010 | 718 | | 10.0% |
| 2020 | 661 | | −7.9% |
U.S. Decennial Census

=== 2010 census ===
As of the census of 2010, there were 718 people, 254 households, and 189 families living in the city. The population density was 1,795.0 inhabitants per square mile (693.1/km^{2}). There were 267 housing units at an average density of 667.5 per square mile (257.7/km^{2}). The racial makeup of the city was 93.3% White, 1.8% Native American, 0.1% Asian, 0.8% Pacific Islander, 0.4% from other races, and 3.5% from two or more races. Hispanic or Latino of any race were 2.6% of the population.

There were 254 households, of which 37.8% had children under the age of 18 living with them, 60.2% were married couples living together, 8.7% had a female householder with no husband present, 5.5% had a male householder with no wife present, and 25.6% were non-families. 23.6% of all households were made up of individuals, and 9.5% had someone living alone who was 65 years of age or older. The average household size was 2.60 and the average family size was 3.05.

The median age in the city was 42.7 years. 25.6% of residents were under the age of 18; 5.1% were between the ages of 18 and 24; 22.4% were from 25 to 44; 27% were from 45 to 64; and 19.8% were 65 years of age or older. The gender makeup of the city was 47.8% male and 52.2% female.

=== 2000 census ===
As of the census of 2000, there were 653 people, 232 households, and 171 families living in the city. The population density was 1,976.0 inhabitants per square mile (762.9/km^{2}). There were 255 housing units at an average density of 771.6 per square mile (297.9/km^{2}). The racial makeup of the city was 96.78% White, 0.31% Native American, 0.15% Asian, 0.15% from other races, and 2.60% from two or more races. Hispanic or Latino of any race were 0.46% of the population.

There were 232 households, out of which 36.6% had children under the age of 18 living with them, 62.5% were married couples living together, 8.2% had a female householder with no husband present, and 25.9% were non-families. 23.3% of all households were made up of individuals, and 11.6% had someone living alone who was 65 years of age or older. The average household size was 2.53 and the average family size was 2.99.

In the city, the population was spread out, with 24.3% under the age of 18, 5.5% from 18 to 24, 25.4% from 25 to 44, 20.8% from 45 to 64, and 23.9% who were 65 years of age or older. The median age was 41 years. For every 100 females, there were 89.3 males. For every 100 females age 18 and over, there were 83.0 males.

The median income for a household in the city was $42,813, and the median income for a family was $43,984. Males had a median income of $33,958 versus $21,417 for females. The per capita income for the city was $20,078. About 3.3% of families and 5.4% of the population were below the poverty line, including 5.0% of those under age 18 and 4.2% of those age 65 or over.

== Government ==
The Whitewater government consists of a mayor and five council members. The council meets the fourth Monday of each month at 7PM.

- City Hall, 201 S Elm St.
- US Post Office, 117 S Main St.

== Education ==
=== Public ===
The community is served by Remington USD 206 public school district. The Remington High School mascot is a Bronco.

- Frederic Remington High School north of Brainerd.
- Remington Middle School in Whitewater.
- Remington Elementary School in Potwin.

=== Library ===
- Whitewater Memorial Library

== Media ==
=== Print ===
- The Newton Kansan, regional newspaper from Newton.
- Butler County Times-Gazette, regional newspaper from El Dorado.
- The Wichita Eagle, major regional newspaper from Wichita.

=== Radio ===
Whitewater is served by numerous radio stations of the Wichita-Hutchinson listening market area, and satellite radio. See Media in Wichita, Kansas.

=== Television ===
Whitewater is served by over-the-air ATSC digital TV of the Wichita-Hutchinson viewing market area, cable TV, and satellite TV. See Media in Wichita, Kansas.

== Infrastructure ==
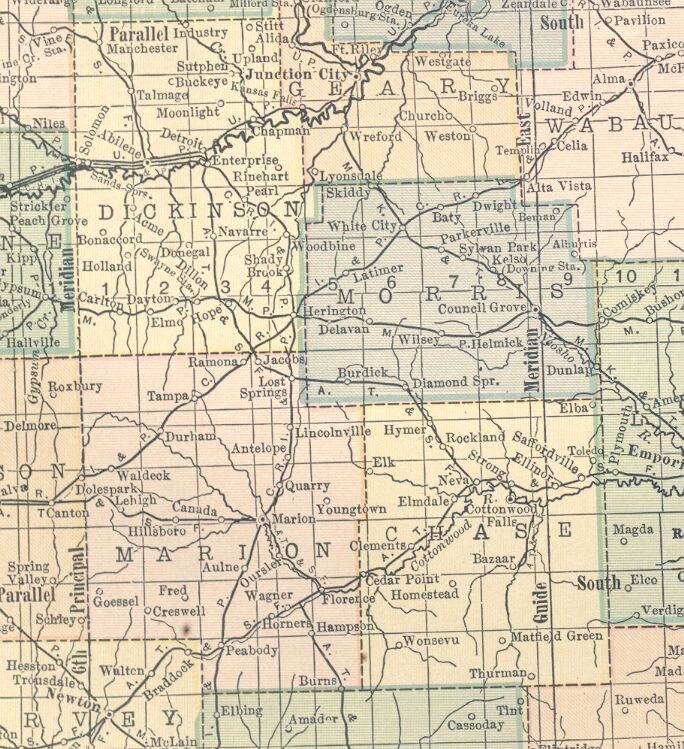
1914 railroad map

=== Transportation ===
K-196 highway runs along the southern side of the city. The Oklahoma Kansas Texas (OKT) line of the Union Pacific Railroad runs through the northwestern side of the city.

The Missouri Pacific Railroad formerly provided passenger rail service along a route from Eldorado to McPherson although this had ended prior to 1946. Additionally, the Chicago, Rock Island and Pacific Railroad provided passenger rail service to Whitewater on their mainline from Minneapolis to Houston until at least 1951. As of 2025, the nearest passenger rail station is located in Newton, where Amtrak's Southwest Chief stops once daily on a route from Chicago to Los Angeles.

== Notable person ==
- Hattie Louthan (1865–1950), writer, author of five books and contributed to newspapers and magazines.

== See also ==
- Milton Township, Butler County, Kansas
- Frederic Remington High School
- Berean Academy
- National Register of Historic Places listings in Butler County, Kansas
  - Oak Lawn Farm Dairy Barn
