= Berean Academy (Kansas) =

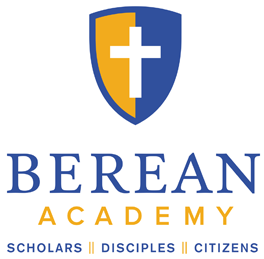

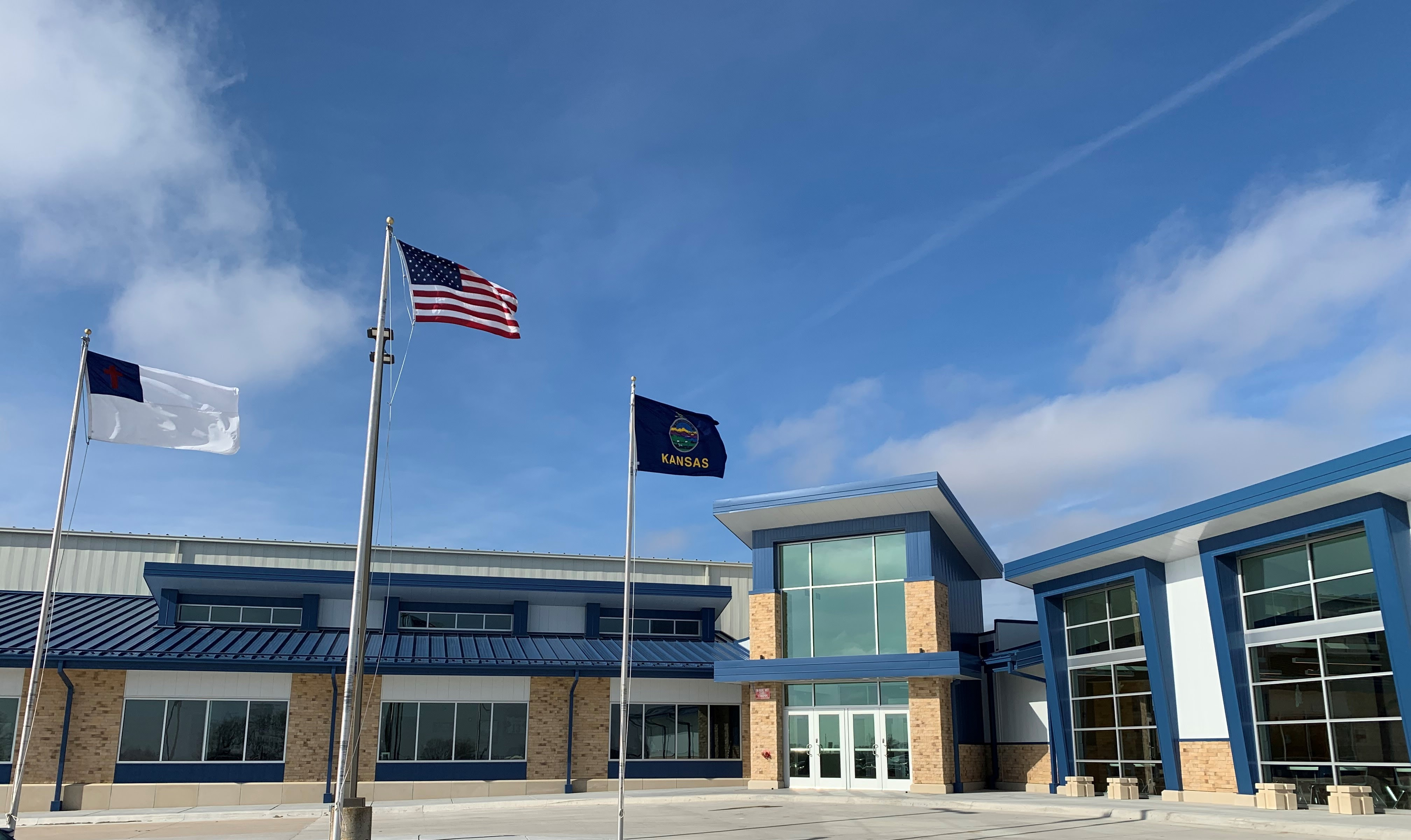

Location
- 201 South Elbing Road; Elbing, Kansas 67041; United States
- Coordinates: 38.050022°N 97.127728°W

Information
- School type: Private, School
- Motto: Scholars || Disciples || Citizens
- Established: 1946
- K-6 Principal: Joni Nord
- 7–12 Principal: Jason Wine
- Head of school: David Funk
- Grades: Kindergarten to 12
- Gender: Coeducational
- Campus size: 40 acres (16 ha)
- Campus type: Rural
- Colors: Blue; Gold
- Slogan: Acts 17:11
- Athletics: Class 2A
- Athletics conference: Heart of America
- Team name: Warriors
- Accreditation: Association of Christian Schools International
- Affiliation: KSHSAA
- Website: bereanwarriors.org

Berean Academy is a private Christian school in Elbing, Kansas, United States, and serves students of grades K to 12.

== History ==
Berean Academy was founded in 1946. It began with fifteen students in grades nine and ten, but quickly expanded to include grades nine through twelve.

The academy was established as a Mennonite school, but in 1966 it dropped its Mennonite affiliation to become an interdenominational Christian school.

By the 1970s, Berean Academy's enrollment was 300 students. Today, Berean Academy includes grades K-12 and has an enrollment of about 350 students.

== Chapel ==
Elementary students meet weekly for chapel. The school has guest speakers from area churches and communities are invited to make presentations to the students. Many missionaries on furlough share at elementary chapel as well as former students, pastors, and parents.

Junior and senior high students meets twice weekly for chapel. Administrators and faculty take turns sharing in chapel. The school brings in outside speakers which include community pastors and youth pastors, missionaries, and college representatives. Student ministry teams lead worship frequently and summer missions reports are given by students.

== Athletics ==
Berean Academy is classified as a 2A school and is a full member of the Kansas State High School Activities Association. The school participate in the Heart of America League.

Junior High Boys

- Basketball
- Soccer
- Track & Field
- Cross country
- Clay Target Club

Junior High Girls

- Basketball
- Track & Field
- Volleyball
- Cross country
- Clay Target Club

High School Boys

- Basketball
- Cross country
- Soccer
- Track & Field
- Golf
- Clay Target Club

High School Girls

- Basketball
- Cross country
- Track and Field
- Volleyball
- Golf
- Clay Target Club

== Notable alumni ==
- John Janzen, Professor Emeritus in the Department of Anthropology at the University of Kansas.

== See also ==
- List of high schools in Kansas
- List of unified school districts in Kansas
