= Whitewater River (Kansas) =

River in Kansas, United States

Whitewater River Whitewater Creek
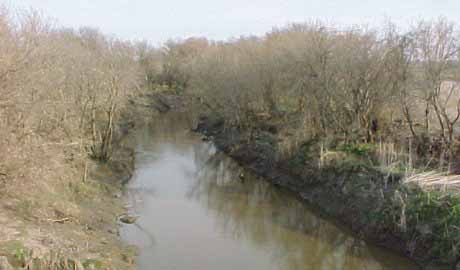
- The Whitewater River near Towanda

Location
- Country: United States
- State: Kansas

Physical characteristics
- Source
  - location: Southern Marion County, Kansas, United States
  - coordinates: 38°06′55″N 097°05′22″W
  - elevation: 1,184 ft (361 m)
- Mouth: Walnut River
  - location: Near Augusta, Kansas, United States
  - coordinates: 37°39′25″N 096°59′30″W
  - elevation: 361 ft (110 m)
- Length: 62 mi (100 km), South

Basin features
- River system: Walnut River

The Whitewater River is a 62-mile-long (100 km) tributary of the Walnut River in southern Kansas in the United States. Via the Walnut and Arkansas Rivers, it is part of the watershed of the Mississippi River.

According to the Geographic Names Information System, the stream has also been known as Whitewater Creek.

== Course ==
The Whitewater River rises in southern Marion County (southeast of Peabody) and flows southwardly into Butler County, past the towns of Potwin and Towanda, then joins the Walnut River at Augusta.

In Butler County, the river collects the West Branch Whitewater River, which rises in Harvey County and flows southeastwardly past Whitewater; and the East Branch Whitewater River, which rises near Burns in Marion County and flows southwestwardly.

== Lakes ==
- Harvey County East Lake, east of Newton
- Augusta Lake, northwest side of Augusta
- Santa Fe Lake, west of Augusta

== See also ==
- List of Kansas rivers
