= Plum Grove Township, Kansas =

Plum Grove Township Butler County, Kansas
- Township
- Location within Butler County

- Location within Kansas
- Coordinates: 37°57′20″N 96°59′16″W
- Country: United States
- State: Kansas
- County: Butler

Area
  - Total: 35.8 sq mi (92.7 km^{2})
  - Land: 35.58 sq mi (92.16 km^{2})
  - Water: 0.21 sq mi (0.54 km^{2}) 0.58%
- Elevation: 1,391 ft (424 m)

Population (2000)
  - Total: 661
  - Density: 18.6/sq mi (7.17/km^{2})
- Time zone: UTC-6 (CST)
  - Summer (DST): UTC-5 (CDT)
- FIPS code: 20-56850
- GNIS ID: 474377
- Website: County website

Plum Grove Township is a township in Butler County, Kansas, United States. As of the 2000 census, its population was 661.

== History ==
Plum Grove Township was organized in 1873.

== Geography ==
Plum Grove Township covers an area of 35.79 square miles (92.7 km^{2}) and contains one incorporated settlement, Potwin. According to the USGS, it contains three cemeteries: Holderman, McGill and Potwin.

The streams of Brush Creek, Diamond Creek, East Branch Whitewater River and Henry Creek run through this township.
