= Fairmount Township, Butler County, Kansas =

Fairmount Township Butler County, Kansas
- Township
- Location within Butler County

- Location within Kansas
- Coordinates: 38°02′35″N 097°05′51″W
- Country: United States
- State: Kansas
- County: Butler

Area
  - Total: 36.43 sq mi (94.35 km^{2})
  - Land: 36.38 sq mi (94.22 km^{2})
  - Water: 0.050 sq mi (0.13 km^{2}) 0.14%
- Elevation: 1,385 ft (422 m)

Population (2000)
  - Total: 511
  - Density: 14.0/sq mi (5.42/km^{2})
- Time zone: UTC-6 (CST)
  - Summer (DST): UTC-5 (CDT)
- FIPS code: 20-22275
- GNIS ID: 473726
- Website: County website

Fairmount Township is a township in Butler County, Kansas, United States. As of the 2000 census, its population was 511.

== History ==
Fairmount Township was organized in 1873.

== Geography ==
Fairmount Township covers an area of 36.43 square miles (94.4 km^{2}) and contains one incorporated settlement, Elbing.

== Cemeteries ==
The township contains the following cemeteries:

- Fairmount Cemetery
- Pleasant View Cemetery.
- Zion Cemetery.
