= Potwin, Kansas =

City in Butler County, Kansas

- City
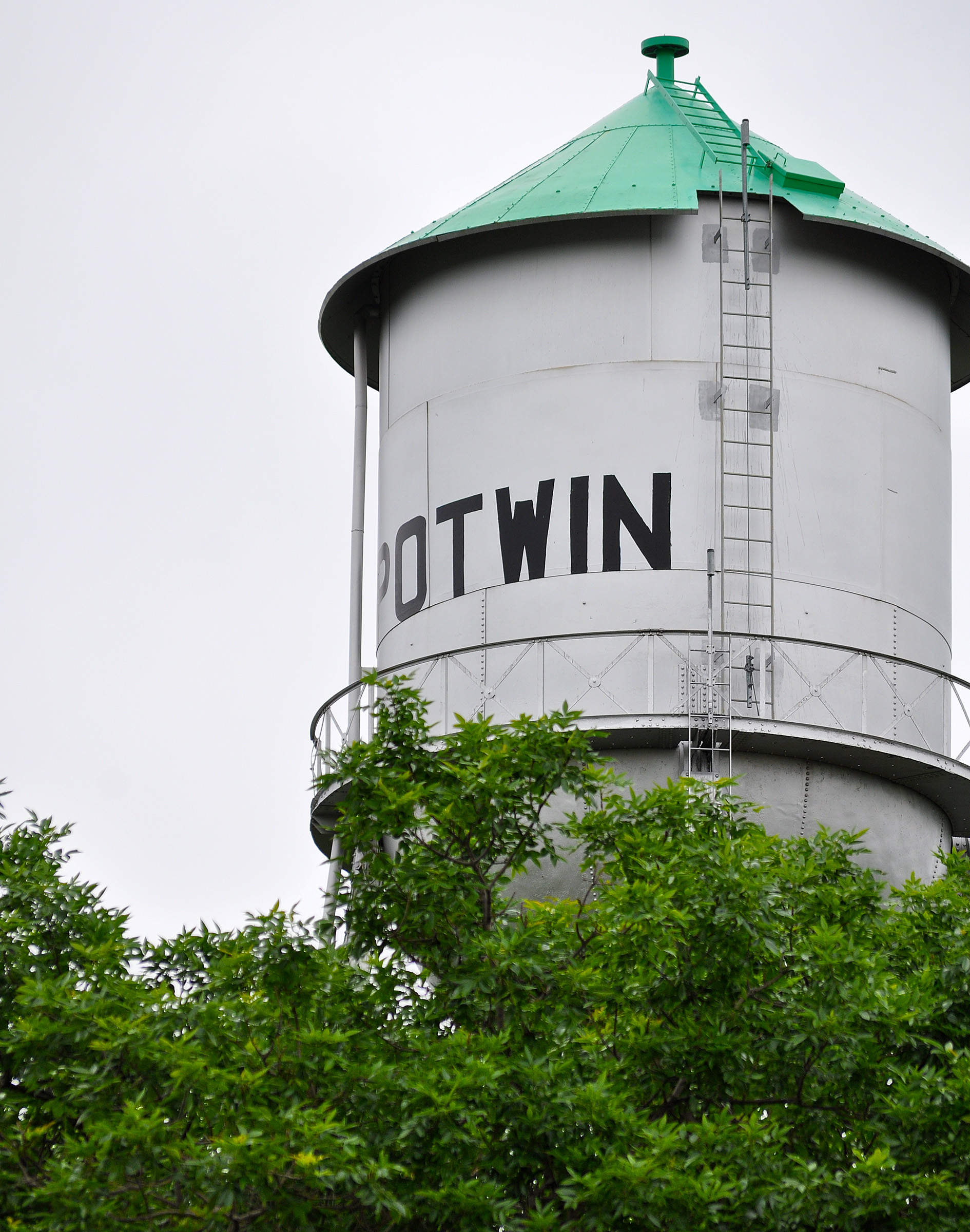
- Potwin water tower (2015)

- Location within Butler County and Kansas

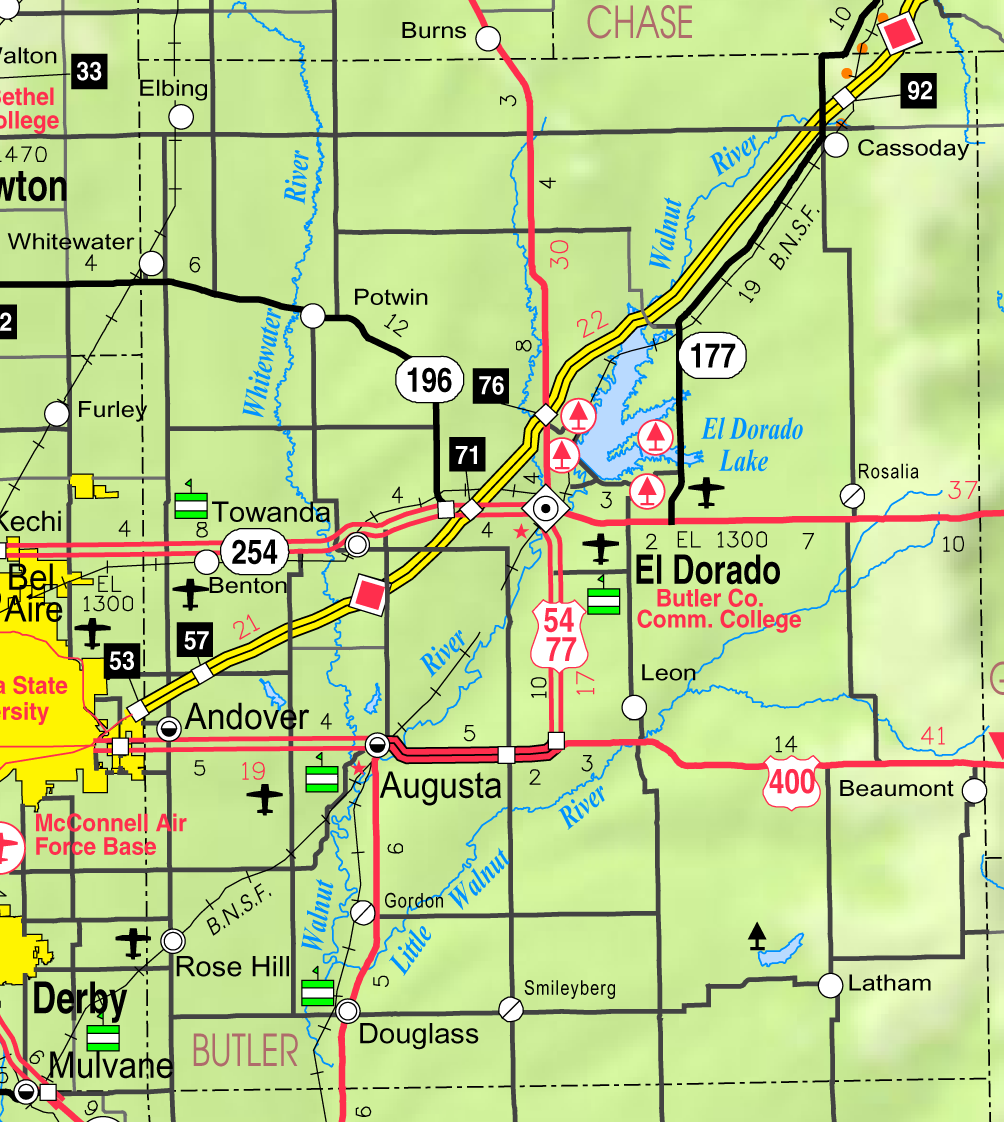
- KDOT map of Butler County (legend)
- Coordinates: 37°56′19″N 97°01′06″W
- Country: United States
- State: Kansas
- County: Butler
- Founded: 1880s
- Incorporated: 1885
- Named for: Charles Potwin

Government
  - Type: Mayor–Council
  - Mayor: Heath Austin

Area
  - Total: 0.24 sq mi (0.61 km^{2})
  - Land: 0.24 sq mi (0.61 km^{2})
  - Water: 0 sq mi (0.00 km^{2})
- Elevation: 1,345 ft (410 m)

Population (2020)
  - Total: 421
  - Density: 1,800/sq mi (690/km^{2})
- Time zone: UTC-6 (CST)
  - Summer (DST): UTC-5 (CDT)
- ZIP Code: 67123
- Area code: 620
- FIPS code: 20-57300
- GNIS ID: 2396263
- Website: potwinks.com

Potwin is a city in Butler County, Kansas, United States. It is named after the town site land owner Charles Potwin. As of the 2020 census, the population of the city was 421.

== History ==
=== Early history ===
For many millennia, the Great Plains of North America was inhabited by nomadic Native Americans. From the 16th century to 18th century, the Kingdom of France claimed ownership of large parts of North America. In 1762, after the French and Indian War, France secretly ceded New France to Spain, per the Treaty of Fontainebleau.

=== 19th century ===
In 1802, Spain returned most of the land to France. In 1803, most of the land for modern day Kansas was acquired by the United States from France as part of the 828,000 square mile Louisiana Purchase for 2.83 cents per acre.

In 1854, the Kansas Territory was organized, then in 1861 Kansas became the 34th U.S. state. In 1855, Butler County was established within the Kansas Territory, which included the land for modern day Potwin.

Potwin was incorporated as a town on April 8, 1885. This land, owned by Charles Potwin, whereby the town received its name, became a station for the Missouri Pacific Railroad, instigated by William I. Joseph, known as the Father of Potwin.

Joseph came from West Virginia and, as more settlers arrived, became interested in a railroad to serve the area. After much diligent pursuit, the station was built and Joseph, a land agent for Charles Potwin, began development of a town site around the Potwin station. He opened a land office where the Potwin grocery now stands.

A post office was established in Ayr (an extinct town) on July 12, 1875, but it was moved to Potwin on September 22, 1885.

It quickly grew, including some businesses and houses from nearby community of Plum Grove.

=== 20th century ===
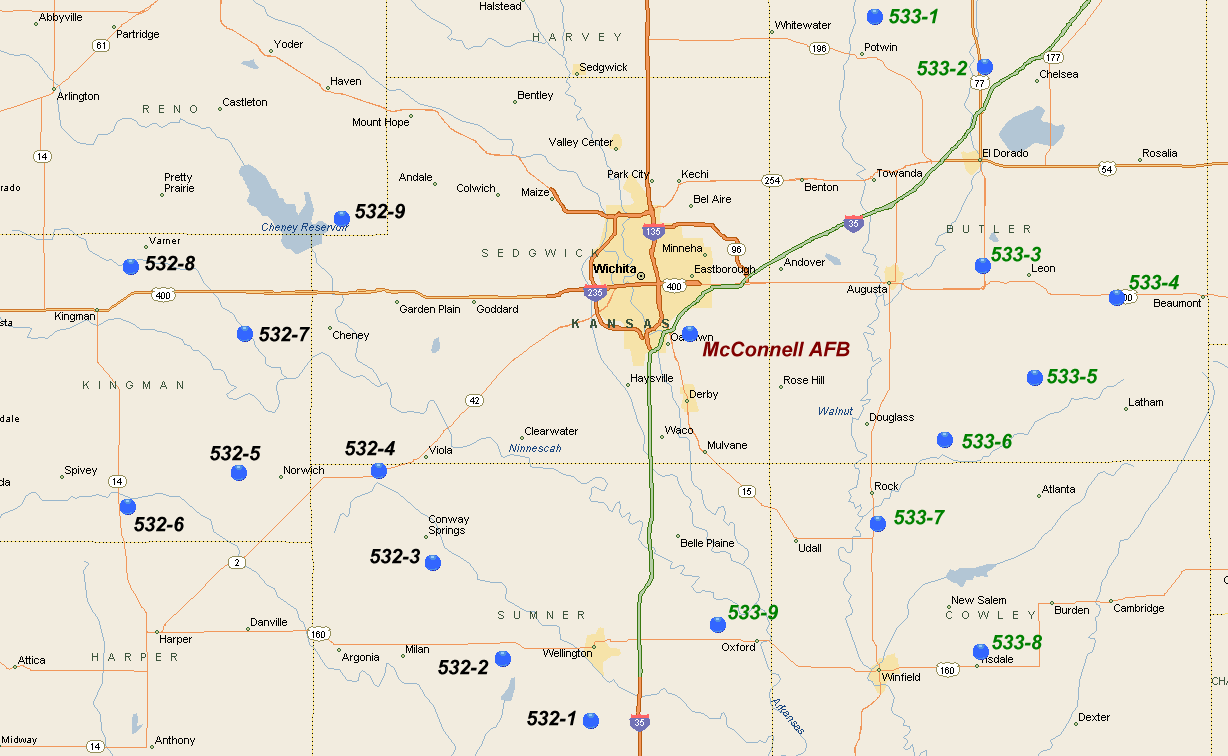
381st Strategic Missile Wing Titan II intercontinental ballistic missile sites

During half of the twentieth century, Potwin enjoyed the prosperity of oil fields in the Mid-Continent oil province. In 1920, John (Jack) Vickers (1891–1940) built the Vickers Oil Refinery in Potwin. He got his start in oil fields in Butler County, commencing with the lease on the Parris Farm 10 miles north of Potwin, production reached 16,000 barrels a day during the 1950s. In 1964, distressed economic conditions shut down the oil processing facilities. The company was sold to Swift & Company and the remaining operations were closed in 1970, and later demolished. In 1934, Vickers built a large mansion (named "Vickridge") east of Wichita (now in the city limits), which his estate later become the current site of Kapaun Mt. Carmel High School.

In 1961, Frederic Remington High School was built immediately north of Brainerd. Leading up to this new school, Whitewater, Potwin, Brainerd, Elbing, Furley, Countryside, and Golden Gate schools merged to form a joint rural high school. Heated opposition between Whitewater and Potwin occurred during the discussion for the location of the new high school. Rural voters pushed for a centralized location in neither town. A public vote was passed to build the new school near Brainerd.

From 1960s to 1980s, a Titan II intercontinental ballistic missile site was located north of Potwin. The site was one of eighteen overseen by the 381st Strategic Missile Wing at McConnell Air Force Base in Wichita, Kansas. The Titan II near Potwin likely contained a 9 megaton W-53 nuclear warhead.

=== 21st century ===
In 2010, the Keystone-Cushing Pipeline (Phase II) was constructed along the east city limits of Potwin, north to south through Butler County, with much controversy over tax exemption and environmental concerns (if a leak ever occurs). A pumping station named Burns was built two miles north of Potwin, and new power lines were built from a high-voltage line 0.3 mile east of De Graff.

In 2002, an unusual technical decision caused a farmstead approximately four miles northeast of Potwin to be the default geolocation of 600 million IP addresses when the Massachusetts-based digital mapping company MaxMind changed the putative geographic center of the contiguous United States from 39.8333333,-98.585522 to 38.0000,-97.0000. In 2016, the couple that lived at the farmstead sued MaxMind because of their negligent conduct. The default geolocation was later changed to the middle of Cheney Reservoir in Kansas.

== Geography ==
According to the United States Census Bureau, the city has a total area of 0.24 square miles (0.62 km^{2}), all land.

=== Climate ===
The climate in this area is characterized by hot, humid summers and generally mild to cool winters. According to the Köppen Climate Classification system, Potwin has a humid subtropical climate, abbreviated "Cfa" on climate maps.

== Demographics ==
Historical population
Census	Pop.	Note	%±
1910	249		—
1920	415		66.7%
1930	427		2.9%
1940	487		14.1%
1950	465		−4.5%
1960	635		36.6%
1970	497		−21.7%
1980	563		13.3%
1990	448		−20.4%
2000	457		2.0%
2010	449		−1.8%
2020	421		−6.2%
U.S. Decennial Census

=== 2020 census ===
The 2020 United States census counted 421 people, 168 households, and 113 families in Potwin. The population density was 1,791.5 per square mile (691.7/km^{2}). There were 195 housing units at an average density of 829.8 per square mile (320.4/km^{2}). The racial makeup was 90.74% (382) white or European American (89.07% non-Hispanic white), 0.48% (2) black or African-American, 2.14% (9) Native American or Alaska Native, 0.0% (0) Asian, 0.0% (0) Pacific Islander or Native Hawaiian, 0.95% (4) from other races, and 5.7% (24) from two or more races. Hispanic or Latino of any race was 4.75% (20) of the population.

Of the 168 households, 32.7% had children under the age of 18; 44.6% were married couples living together; 27.4% had a female householder with no spouse or partner present. 29.2% of households consisted of individuals and 14.3% had someone living alone who was 65 years of age or older. The average household size was 2.8 and the average family size was 3.4. The percent of those with a bachelor's degree or higher was estimated to be 12.6% of the population.

22.6% of the population was under the age of 18, 9.7% from 18 to 24, 24.5% from 25 to 44, 23.8% from 45 to 64, and 19.5% who were 65 years of age or older. The median age was 39.4 years. For every 100 females, there were 99.5 males. For every 100 females ages 18 and older, there were 102.5 males.

The 2016–2020 5-year American Community Survey estimates show that the median household income was $41,618 (with a margin of error of +/- $9,667) and the median family income was $43,750 (+/- $12,064). Males had a median income of $39,115 (+/- $3,013) versus $27,250 (+/- $12,459) for females. The median income for those above 16 years old was $33,125 (+/- $8,498). Approximately, 7.8% of families and 7.2% of the population were below the poverty line, including 9.9% of those under the age of 18 and 15.3% of those ages 65 or over.

=== 2010 census ===
As of the census of 2010, there were 449 people, 181 households, and 130 families residing in the city. The population density was 1,870.8 inhabitants per square mile (722.3/km^{2}). There were 205 housing units at an average density of 854.2 per square mile (329.8/km^{2}). The racial makeup of the city was 92.2% White, 0.2% African American, 1.3% Native American, 0.7% Asian, 2.2% from other races, and 3.3% from two or more races. Hispanic or Latino of any race were 5.6% of the population.

There were 181 households, of which 30.4% had children under the age of 18 living with them, 55.8% were married couples living together, 9.9% had a female householder with no husband present, 6.1% had a male householder with no wife present, and 28.2% were non-families. 24.9% of all households were made up of individuals, and 11.1% had someone living alone who was 65 years of age or older. The average household size was 2.48 and the average family size was 2.94.

The median age in the city was 39.4 years. 25.2% of residents were under the age of 18; 8.2% were between the ages of 18 and 24; 24.1% were from 25 to 44; 28.5% were from 45 to 64; and 14% were 65 years of age or older. The gender makeup of the city was 49.9% male and 50.1% female.

=== 2000 census ===
As of the census of 2000, there were 457 people, 187 households, and 123 families residing in the city. The population density was 2,001.1 inhabitants per square mile (772.6/km^{2}). There were 208 housing units at an average density of 910.8 per square mile (351.7/km^{2}).

The racial makeup of the city was 95.40% White, 1.53% Native American, 0.22% Asian, and 2.84% from two or more races. Hispanic or Latino of any race were 0.88% of the population.

There were 187 households, out of which 33.2% had children under the age of 18 living with them, 53.5% were married couples living together, 8.0% had a female householder with no husband present, and 34.2% were non-families. 28.3% of all households were made up of individuals, and 17.1% had someone living alone who was 65 years of age or older. The average household size was 2.44 and the average family size was 2.95.

In the city, the population was spread out, with 26.0% under the age of 18, 9.0% from 18 to 24, 28.0% from 25 to 44, 21.9% from 45 to 64, and 15.1% who were 65 years of age or older. The median age was 37 years. For every 100 females, there were 100.4 males. For every 100 females age 18 and over, there were 94.3 males.

The median income for a household in the city was $39,091, and the median income for a family was $42,500. Males had a median income of $31,544 versus $18,375 for females. The per capita income for the city was $18,254. About 4.7% of families and 8.3% of the population were below the poverty line, including 6.8% of those under age 18 and 8.6% of those age 65 or over.

== Education ==
The community is served by Remington USD 206 public school district. The Remington High School mascot is a Bronco.

- Frederic Remington High School north of Brainerd.
- Remington Middle School in Whitewater.
- Remington Elementary School in Potwin.

Potwin High School was closed through school unification. The Potwin High School mascot was Greyhounds.

== Media ==
=== Print ===
- The Newton Kansan, regional newspaper from Newton.
- Butler County Times-Gazette, regional newspaper from El Dorado.
- The Wichita Eagle, major regional newspaper from Wichita.

=== Radio ===
Potwin is served by numerous radio stations of the Wichita-Hutchinson listening market area, and satellite radio. See Media in Wichita, Kansas.

=== Television ===
Potwin is served by over-the-air ATSC digital TV of the Wichita-Hutchinson viewing market area, cable TV, and satellite TV. See Media in Wichita, Kansas.

== Infrastructure ==
=== Transportation ===
K-196 highway runs along the south side of the city.

The Missouri Pacific Railroad formerly provided passenger rail service along a route from Eldorado to McPherson although this had ended prior to 1946. As of 2025, the nearest passenger rail station is located in Newton, where Amtrak's Southwest Chief stops once daily on a route from Chicago to Los Angeles.

== See also ==
- Plum Grove Township, Butler County, Kansas
- Frederic Remington High School
