= Furley, Kansas =

Unincorporated community in Sedgwick County, Kansas

- Unincorporated community and CDP
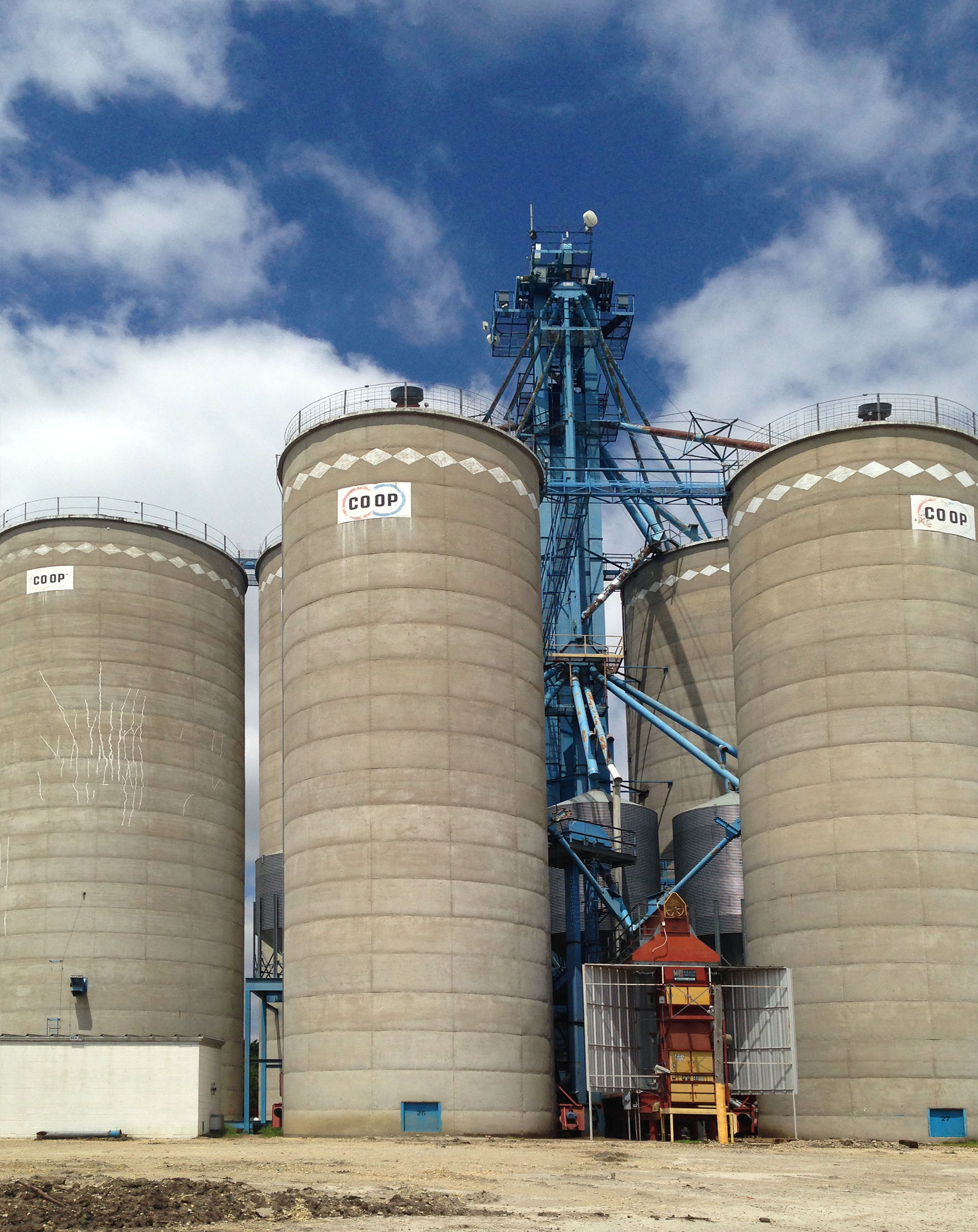
- Furley CO-OP (2015)

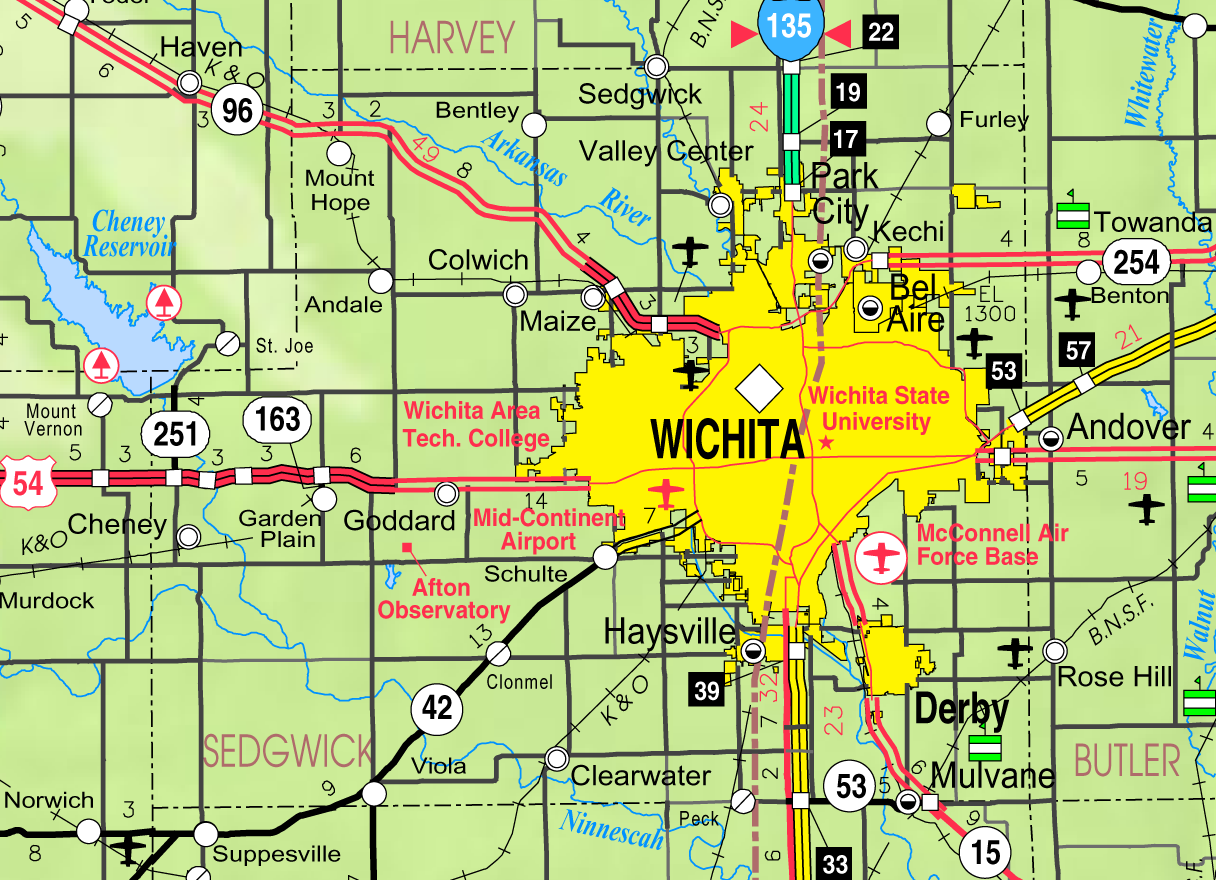
- KDOT map of Sedgwick County (legend)

- Location within Kansas Location within the United States
- Coordinates: 37°52′45″N 097°12′46″W
- Country: United States
- State: Kansas
- County: Sedgwick
- Township: Lincoln
- Elevation: 1,411 ft (430 m)

Population (2020)
  - Total: 39
- Time zone: UTC-6 (CST)
  - Summer (DST): UTC-5 (CDT)
- Area code: 316
- FIPS code: 20-24975
- GNIS ID: 473703

Furley is an unincorporated community and census-designated place (CDP) in Sedgwick County, Kansas, United States. As of the 2020 census, the population was 39. It is located northwest of the intersection of Greenwich Road and 101st Street N, along the Union Pacific Railroad.

== History ==
=== 19th century ===
In 1887, the Chicago, Kansas and Nebraska Railway built a branch line north–south from Herington through Furley to Caldwell. By 1893, this branch line was incrementally built to Fort Worth, Texas. It foreclosed in 1891 and was taken over by Chicago, Rock Island and Pacific Railway, which shut down in 1980 and reorganized as Oklahoma, Kansas and Texas Railroad, merged in 1988 with Missouri Pacific Railroad, and finally merged in 1997 with Union Pacific Railroad. Most locals still refer to this railroad as the "Rock Island".

A post office was opened in Furley in 1887, and remained in operation until it was discontinued in 1953.

== Geography ==
Furley is located at 37°52′45″N 97°12′46″W (37.8791795, -97.2128162).

== Demographics ==
Historical population
Census	Pop.	Note	%±
2020	39		—
U.S. Decennial Census

The 2020 United States census counted 39 people, 18 households, and 15 families in Furley. The population density was 157.9 per square mile (61.0/km^{2}). There were 24 housing units at an average density of 97.2 per square mile (37.5/km^{2}). The racial makeup was 71.79% (28) white or European American (71.79% non-Hispanic white), 0.0% (0) black or African-American, 0.0% (0) Native American or Alaska Native, 0.0% (0) Asian, 5.13% (2) Pacific Islander or Native Hawaiian, 2.56% (1) from other races, and 20.51% (8) from two or more races. Hispanic or Latino of any race was 5.13% (2) of the population.

Of the 18 households, 27.8% had children under the age of 18; 72.2% were married couples living together; 0.0% had a female householder with no spouse or partner present. 11.1% of households consisted of individuals and 0.0% had someone living alone who was 65 years of age or older. The average household size was 2.5 and the average family size was 2.5.

12.8% of the population was under the age of 18, 2.6% from 18 to 24, 20.5% from 25 to 44, 56.4% from 45 to 64, and 7.7% who were 65 years of age or older. The median age was 54.5 years. For every 100 females, there were 77.3 males. For every 100 females ages 18 and older, there were 78.9 males.

== Education ==
The community is served by Remington USD 206 public school district. The Remington High School mascot is a Bronco.

- Frederic Remington High School at 8850 NW Meadowlark Road, north of Brainerd.
- Remington Middle School at 316 E Topeka Street in Whitewater.
- Remington Elementary School at 200 E Ellis Avenue in Potwin.

== Infrastructure ==
=== Transportation ===
I-135 highway is approximately six miles west of the community. The Union Pacific Railroad runs through Furley.

The Chicago, Rock Island and Pacific Railroad formerly provided passenger rail service to Furley on their mainline from Minneapolis to Houston until at least 1951. As of 2025, the nearest passenger rail station is located in Newton, where Amtrak's Southwest Chief stops once daily on a route from Chicago to Los Angeles.

=== Utilities ===
- Internet
  - Wireless is provided by Pixius Communications.
  - Satellite is provided by HughesNet, StarBand, WildBlue.
- TV
  - Satellite is provided by DirecTV, Dish Network.
  - Terrestrial is provided by regional digital TV stations.
- Water
  - Rural is provided by Sedgwick County RWD #2 and Harvey County RWD #1 (map).
