= Midian, Kansas =

Unincorporated community in Butler County, Kansas

Coordinates: 37°48′37″N 96°57′11″W

Midian was an oil boom town in the early 20th century.

Midian is an unincorporated community in Butler County, Kansas, United States.

== History ==
A post office was opened in Midian in 1918, and remained in operation until it was discontinued in 1950.

== Education ==
The community is served by Circle USD 375 public school district.
