= Milton Township, Butler County, Kansas =

Milton Township Butler County, Kansas
- Township
- Location within Butler County

- Location within Kansas
- Coordinates: 37°57′25″N 97°5′51″W
- Country: United States
- State: Kansas
- County: Butler

Area
  - Total: 36.37 sq mi (94.21 km^{2})
  - Land: 36.32 sq mi (94.07 km^{2})
  - Water: 0.054 sq mi (0.14 km^{2}) 0.15%
- Elevation: 1,391 ft (424 m)

Population (2000)
  - Total: 1,136
  - Density: 31.28/sq mi (12.08/km^{2})
- Time zone: UTC-6 (CST)
  - Summer (DST): UTC-5 (CDT)
- FIPS code: 20-46875
- GNIS ID: 473727
- Website: County website

Milton Township is a township in Butler County, Kansas, United States. As of the 2000 census, its population was 1,136.

== History ==
Milton Township was created in 1873. It was named for Milton C. Snorf, a pioneer settler.

== Geography ==
Milton Township covers an area of 36.38 square miles (94.2 km^{2}) and contains one incorporated settlement, Whitewater. According to the USGS, it contains three cemeteries: Brainerd, Harder and Swiss. The stream of Dry Creek runs through this township.
