= Towanda, Kansas =

City in Butler County, Kansas

- City
- Location within Butler County and Kansas

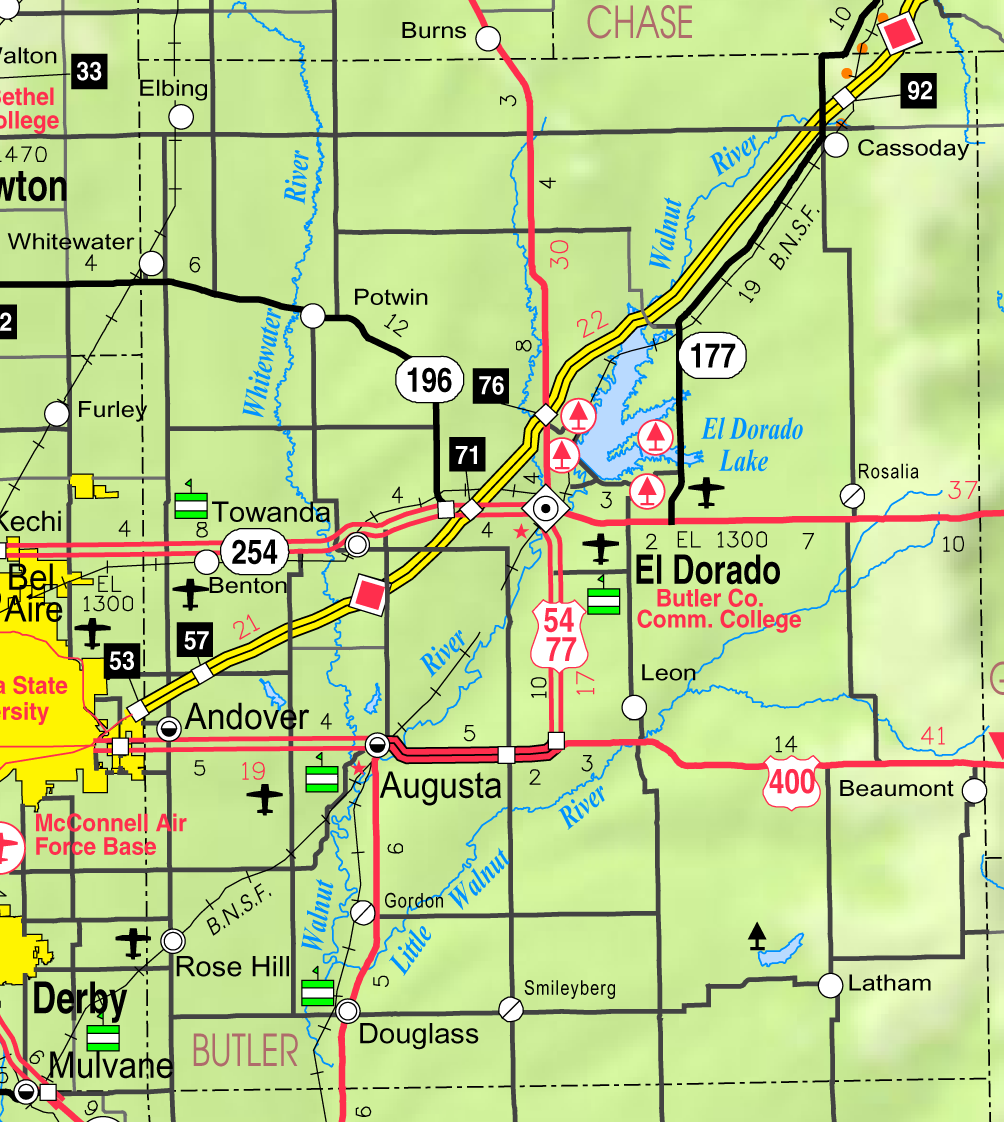
- KDOT map of Butler County (legend)
- Coordinates: 37°47′43″N 96°59′47″W
- Country: United States
- State: Kansas
- County: Butler
- Founded: 1870
- Incorporated: 1905
- Named for: "big village"

Government
  - Type: Council-Mayor
  - Mayor: Jennifer Shaults

Area
  - Total: 0.92 sq mi (2.38 km^{2})
  - Land: 0.92 sq mi (2.37 km^{2})
  - Water: 0.0039 sq mi (0.01 km^{2})
- Elevation: 1,293 ft (394 m)

Population (2020)
  - Total: 1,447
  - Density: 1,580/sq mi (611/km^{2})
- Time zone: UTC-6 (CST)
  - Summer (DST): UTC-5 (CDT)
- ZIP Code: 67144
- Area code: 316
- FIPS code: 20-71125
- GNIS ID: 2397041
- Website: cityoftowanda.com

Towanda is a city in Butler County, Kansas, United States. As of the 2020 census, the population of the city was 1,447.

== History ==
Towanda was established in 1870 and incorporated in 1905. Towanda is an Osage-language name meaning "big village".

An F4 tornado devastated the town on March 31, 1892, killing at least nine people and injuring 60.

=== 21st century ===
In 2010, the Keystone-Cushing Pipeline (Phase II) was constructed a few blocks west of Towanda (immediately west of SW River Valley Rd), running north to south through Butler County. With much controversy over tax exemption and environmental concerns (if a leak ever occurs).

== Geography ==
Towanda is located along the Whitewater River.

According to the United States Census Bureau, the city has a total area of 1.06 square miles (2.75 km^{2}), all land.

== Demographics ==
Historical population
Census	Pop.	Note	%±
1880	53		—
1890	156		194.3%
1910	275		—
1920	718		161.1%
1930	424		−40.9%
1940	374		−11.8%
1950	417		11.5%
1960	1,031		147.2%
1970	1,190		15.4%
1980	1,332		11.9%
1990	1,289		−3.2%
2000	1,338		3.8%
2010	1,450		8.4%
2020	1,447		−0.2%
U.S. Decennial Census

=== 2010 census ===
As of the census of 2010, there were 1,450 people, 524 households, and 397 families living in the city. The population density was 1,367.9 inhabitants per square mile (528.1/km^{2}). There were 577 housing units at an average density of 544.3 per square mile (210.2/km^{2}). The racial makeup of the city was 95.3% White, 0.3% African American, 1.1% Native American, 0.5% Asian, 0.4% Pacific Islander, 0.5% from other races, and 1.9% from two or more races. Hispanic or Latino of any race were 2.7% of the population.

There were 524 households, of which 39.9% had children under the age of 18 living with them, 59.9% were married couples living together, 9.4% had a female householder with no husband present, 6.5% had a male householder with no wife present, and 24.2% were non-families. 20.4% of all households were made up of individuals, and 7.2% had someone living alone who was 65 years of age or older. The average household size was 2.77 and the average family size was 3.15.

The median age in the city was 34.5 years. 30% of residents were under the age of 18; 8.9% were between the ages of 18 and 24; 24.4% were from 25 to 44; 25.1% were from 45 to 64; and 11.7% were 65 years of age or older. The gender makeup of the city was 50.0% male and 50.0% female.

=== 2000 census ===
As of the census of 2000, there were 1,338 people, 492 households, and 383 families living in the city. The population density was 1,804.8 inhabitants per square mile (696.8/km^{2}). There were 537 housing units at an average density of 724.3 per square mile (279.7/km^{2}). The racial makeup of the city was 96.79% White, 0.37% African American, 0.37% Native American, 0.22% Asian, 0.22% from other races, and 2.02% from two or more races. Hispanic or Latino of any race were 0.75% of the population.

There were 492 households, out of which 39.2% had children under the age of 18 living with them, 66.1% were married couples living together, 8.3% had a female householder with no husband present, and 22.0% were non-families. 20.7% of all households were made up of individuals, and 8.1% had someone living alone who was 65 years of age or older. The average household size was 2.72 and the average family size was 3.14.

In the city, the population was spread out, with 29.3% under the age of 18, 9.2% from 18 to 24, 29.0% from 25 to 44, 20.5% from 45 to 64, and 12.0% who were 65 years of age or older. The median age was 34 years. For every 100 females, there were 96.2 males. For every 100 females age 18 and over, there were 92.7 males.

The median income for a household in the city was $41,875, and the median income for a family was $47,188. Males had a median income of $32,250 versus $24,167 for females. The per capita income for the city was $17,815. About 5.1% of families and 6.5% of the population were below the poverty line, including 9.0% of those under age 18 and 5.0% of those ages 65 or over.

== Education ==
The community is served by Circle USD 375 public school district. Circle High School mascot is the Thunderbirds.

== Notable people ==
- Jordan Phillips, defensive lineman for the Dallas Cowboys
- Garner E. Shriver, U.S. Representative from Kansas

== See also ==
- National Register of Historic Places listings in Butler County, Kansas
  - Towanda Masonic Lodge No. 30 A.F. and A.M.
