= Argon (disambiguation) =

Argon is a chemical element with symbol Ar and atomic number 18.

Argon may also refer to:

== Computing ==
- Argon, a family of Soviet computers
- Argon, the codename of the first AMD Athlon core
- Argon, an Augmented Reality browser from Georgia Tech
- Argon, a 3-D modeling software package from Ashlar-Vellum
- Argon2, a cryptographic key derivation function
- Gemini 4 Argon, a large language model

== Fiction ==
- Argons, the main antagonists in the game TERA: Rising
- Argon, a faction in the X game series
- Argon City, the main setting of Tron: Uprising

== Other uses ==
- Argon (1908 automobile), a defunct British automobile
- Argon (clothing), Indian garment
- Argon, a codename used for the KH-5 Argon reconnaissance satellite
- Argon people, of the Ladakh region in the Indian state of Jammu and Kashmir
- Argon Tower, a landform in Utah, USA
- Arghun, a.k.a. Argon (c. 1258 – 1291), the fourth ruler of the Mongol empire's Ilkhanate
- Ali Argon, American engineer
- Argon (TV series), 2017 South Korean TV series
- Argon (band), South Korean boy band

== See also ==
- Aragon (disambiguation)
- Argonne (disambiguation)
- Argonaut (disambiguation)
- Ar (disambiguation)
- Ergon (disambiguation)
- Orgon
