= Argonia (disambiguation) =

Argonia is a small city in Kansas, United States.

Argonia may also refer to:

- Argonia USD 359, a school district centred on the city
- Argonia, or Black Marsh, a fictional region in The Elder Scrolls series of video games
- a fictional location in the 1990 video game StarTropics

== See also ==
- Argonian (disambiguation)
