= Argonian =

Argonian may refer to:

- a fictional race in The Elder Scrolls series of video games
- inhabitants of the fictional Argo City in DC Comics
- inhabitants of any of the places (real or fictional) known as Argonia

== See also ==
- Argonium, a chemical compound
- Aragonian (disambiguation)
- Argon people
- Argon (disambiguation)
- Argo (adjective: Argoan)
- Organians, a race in Star Trek
