= Edmundo Domínguez Aragonés =

Mexican writer

Edmundo Domínguez Aragonés (Note: In this Mexican name, the surname is Domínguez and the second or maternal family name is Aragonés.) (27 November 1938 – 12 September 2014) was a Spanish-born Mexican chronicler, journalist, essayist, novelist and poet.

== Early life and career ==
Edmundo Domínguez Aragonés was born in Argentona, Catalonia, Spain, on 27 November 1938. In 1939, when he was eight months old, he came with his family to the Mexican state of Veracruz. He was naturalized as a Mexican citizen in 1958 under a decree established during the administration of President Lázaro Cárdenas that granted citizenship to Spanish refugees. He studied arts at the University of Guadalajara.

Domínguez Aragonés held numerous positions in Mexican journalism and media throughout his career. He served as director general of the Organización Editorial Mexicana (OEM), collaborator at Notimex, deputy director of supervision and operation of the Dirección General de Radio, Televisión y Cinematografía (RTC), political information director-editor at Entrelíneas, deputy director of El Gallo Ilustrado, and director of the editorial section of El Sol de México. He was also founding director of Opinión Cultural, co-founded with Horacio Enrique Nansen, and founder of La Calle, co-founded with José Barrera Ortiz, as well as founder of the Instituto Politécnico Nacional publication IPN: Ciencia, Arte: Cultura.

He contributed to numerous publications including El Día, El Informador, El Occidental, El Universal, Excélsior, Hoy, La Palabra y El Hombre, Revista de la Universidad de México, Siempre!, Siete, Tiempo, and Ovaciones. He received the Plaza & Janés Award for La fiera de la piel pintada.

=== Works ===
- Argón 18 inicia [Argon 18 begins] (in Spanish). Editorial Diógenes. 1971. OCLC 00426465.
- Contra mitos del mexicano [Countering Mexican myths] (in Spanish). Gernika. 1985. ISBN 9686642242.

== Personal life ==
Domínguez Aragonés was married to Mexican writer María Luisa Mendoza, nicknamed La China, with whom he co-authored Dos palabras dos: crónica de un informe and Allende el Bravo.

He died in Mexico City on 12 September 2014.

== Bibliography ==
- Enciclopedia de México; Alvarez, José Rogelio; Zimmerman Memorial Fund, Irene (2000). Enciclopedia de México: Cordoncillo-Ejército (in Spanish). Enciclopedia de México. ISBN 1564090345.
