= Argonne =

Argonne may refer to:

- The Forest of Argonne, France
- Argonne National Laboratory, a U.S. D.O.E. National Laboratory near Chicago, Illinois
- Meuse-Argonne Offensive, also called the Battle of Argonne Forest, a World War I battle
- Argonne, South Dakota, a ghost town in the United States
- Argonne, Wisconsin, a town, US
- Argonne (CDP), Wisconsin, an unincorporated community, US
- USS Argonne (1918), built in 1916 at Kobe, Japan, by the Kawasaki Dockyards.
- USS Argonne (AS-10), originally designated AP-4 and commissioned 8 November 1921.
- Argonne (automobile), a short-lived U.S. car company
- Argonne Rebels, an inactive DCI Division I drum and bugle corps from Great Bend, Kansas
- Hotel Argonne, a historic hotel in downtown Lima, Ohio, United States
