= Luis Y. Aragón =

Mexican painter & sculptor (1930–2026)

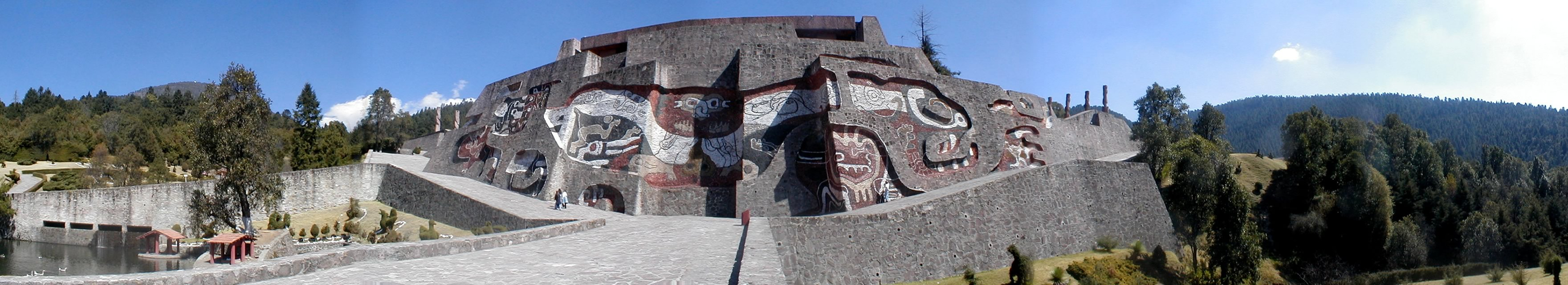
Mural at the Centro Ceremonial Otomí, Temoaya, State of Mexico

Luis Ygnacio Aragón Valladares (Note: In this Mexican name, the surname is Aragón and the second or maternal family name is Valladares.) (April 13, 1930 – November 20, 2026) was a Mexican painter and sculptor, best known for his sculpted mural work, as well as the design of the Gawi Tonara award which is given by the state of Chihuahua. His mural work can be found in various parts of Mexico, especially his home state of Chihuahua and Mexico City. His work has been exhibited in Mexico and abroad, generally in the Americas and Europe. He was a member of the Salón de la Plástica Mexicana and worked in Mexico City.

== Life ==
Luis Y. Aragón was born in the city of Chihuahua on 13 April 1930.

He began his art studies at the Escuela Nacional de Pintura, Escultura y Grabado "La Esmeralda" in 1955, studying under Manuel Rodríguez Lozano, Raúl Anguiano, Pablo O'Higgins and Carlos Arnaldo Lang. His career continued uninterrupted since and he had his own studio at the Calzada del Desierto in Mexico City.

Aragón died on November 20, 2026, aged 96.

== Career ==
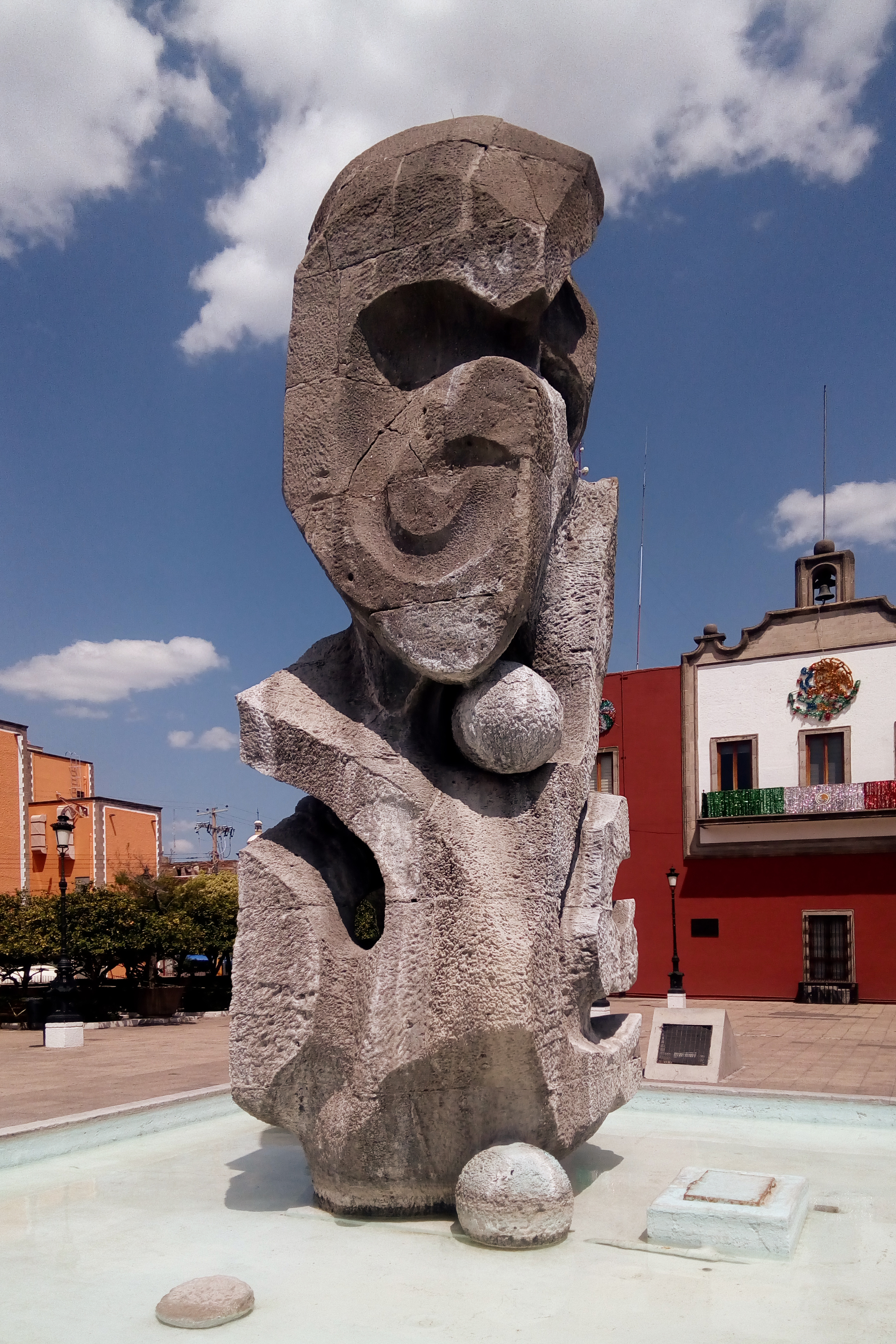
Homage, a quarry sculpture created in 1984 in Irapuato, Guanajuato.

Aragón began his career in 1959, with an individual exhibition called El repartidor de símbolos at the Excélsior gallery, sponsored by Manuel Rodríguez Lozano. From then he became one of the most successful artists from the state of Chihuahua.

Much of his best known work is in the form of murals, especially ones with sculptural elements. These works can be found in various parts of Mexico, especially in the state of Chihuahua. His first was in 1959 for the Centro Deportivo de Polanco in Mexico City. In 1961 he was selected to create the mural “La barca de la vida” for the State of Mexico. In 1971, he was selected to create a monumental sculpture/mural called “Escultura al educador latinoamericano”. The work weighs 110 tons and is located in Toluca. He created another mural for the Plaza de los Jaguares in the same city in 1972. In 1975, he created various sculpted murals for the State of Mexico including Los Tlacuilos, a sculpture/mural with an area of 600 m^{2} (6,500 sq ft) and weighing 1000 tons in the center of Naucalpan. In 1980 he created the mural Da Mishy for the construction of the Centro Ceremonial Otomi, which depicts a number of oral legends of the Otomí people. Inaugurated in 1988, Visión del Mictlán is a sandstone mural of 300 m^{2} (3,200 sq ft) located at the Barranca del Muerto station of the Mexico City Metro. Aragon's other notable murals include “Los Orígenes de Irapuato” and “El Caracol de Corte Transversal” in Guanajuato as well as “ Los Diálogos del Sol y la Luna” and “ La Música de los Números” at the Universidad Autónoma de Chihuahua.

His other sculpture work includes “Madre agua” (1962) for the Saddleback Center in the U.S. state of California, but his best known free sculpture is his design of the “Gawi Tonara” prize which is awarded by his home state during the Festival Internacional de Chihuahua. The small bronze statue is the state's highest award for culture and the arts which has been received by Lucha Villa, Elsa Aguirre, Victor Hugo Rascon Banda, and Erasmo Palma, among others.

From 1959, Aragón's work has been the subject or included in individual and collective exhibitions in the Americas and Europe, in countries such as his native Mexico (including the Polyforum Cultural Siqueiros and the Palacio de Bellas Artes), the United States, Spain, Colombia, France, and Italy. In 1960, he participated in a collective exhibition called “Nueva pintura mexicana” which toured Beirut, Brussels and Paris. In 1962 he participated in the first sculpture biennial at the Instituto Nacional de Bellas Artes y Literatura. He was invited to exhibit his work in Brussels in 1965, traveling in Belgium, France, Spain and north Africa. In Brussels he created a series of drawings based on his experiences in Africa. In 1976 he exhibited at PRONAF in Ciudad Juárez. He participated in the first Salón Nacional de Pintura sponsored by INBA and at the Salón de la Plástica Mexicana in 1996, of which he was a member. His later exhibitions include those in Ciudad Juárez, the Festival Internacional de Chihuahua and the Encuentro Binacional de Artes Visuales Luis Y. Aragón.

In 1976 he lectured at the Universidad Autónoma de Chihuahua on the topic of urban art.

Aragón awards for his work include the Tlacuilo Medal in 2002 from the Instituto Nacional de Bellas Artes and CONACULTA and the Victor Hugo Rascon Banda Medal from the state of Chihuahua in 2009. He received the prize he designed, the Gawi Tonara award, in 2010 and a bronze plaque to honor him was placed in the state's Rotunda of Illustrious Men. In 2004 a book about his work called Escultomurales y mundos oníricos de Luis Y. Aragón was published. An annual event called the “Encuentro Binancial de Artes Visuales Luis Y. Aragón” is named after him. This is sponsored by the Instituto Chihuahuense de la Cultura, CONACULTA and the Fondo Regional para la Cultura y las Artes del Noreste. The bi-national conference has honored the painter and held talks about his life and work.

== Artistry ==
Aragon was a painter, muralist, sculpture and graphic artist, who illustrated a book of poems called Pubis al cielo by Ramon Germonimo Alvera Neder. However, he is best known for his work in sculpture, especially sculptured murals and painting. His mural work includes mixed techniques using acrylics, oils and more, mostly to achieve certain color and textural effects. These also include murals executed in black and white.

The landscapes of his native Chihuahua figure in much of his work, especially his painting. These include areas such as Matachic, Papigochi River and Ciudad Madera, which he knew since childhood. Some of his landscapes are fantastic, often including elements such as angels. These include “Angeles asomandoso a lo desconocido,” “Danzantes en carrusel” and “Musica para angeles viudos.” One of his most important works is a mural called Ángeles, arcángeles, querubines y serafines amalgamados en la línea del infinito, which contains numerous sculpted angels of various types. The work took over two years working at three different points in his life until it was completed in 2002. However, his affinity for angelic figures was not religious but rather aesthetic and as representations of the flow of the universe.
