= Ragonese =

Ragonese is an Italian surname, shortened form of Aragonese, Spanish Aragonés. Notable people with the surname include:

- Ana María Ragonese (1928–1999), Argentine botanist and paleobotanist
- Isabella Ragonese (born 1981), Italian actress
- Jerry Ragonese (born 1986), American lacrosse player
