= Aragonian =

Aragonian may be:

- a somewhat rare adjective form of Aragon
- a name mostly used in Spanish contexts for a geologic age during the Miocene roughly corresponding to the Astaracian, spanning from around 17 to 11 million years ago.

== See also ==
- Argonian (disambiguation)
- Aragonese (disambiguation)
