= María Luisa Mendoza =

Mexican journalist, novelist and politician

- Born: 17 May 1930; Guanajuato, Mexico
- Died: 29 June 2018 (aged 88); Mexico City, Mexico
- Other names: La China Mendoza
- Occupation(s): writer, journalist, politician
- Years active: 1960s–2018

María Luisa Mendoza (17 May 1930 – 29 June 2018), also known as La China Mendoza, was a Mexican journalist, novelist and politician. In the 2003 mid-term election, she was elected to the Chamber of Deputies to represent Guanajuato's 9th district during the 53rd session of Congress (1 September 1985 – 31 August 1988) for the Institutional Revolutionary Party (PRI).

== Biography ==
María Luisa Mendoza was born on 17 May 1930 in Guanajuato, Mexico. She studied Spanish literature at the National Autonomous University of Mexico (UNAM); interior design at Universidad Femenina de México; and scenery design at the National Institute of Fine Arts (INBA).

She began her career writing as a journalist for El Zocalo, collaborating with the cultural paper El Gallo Ilustrado, and co-founding El Día. She also published with Cine Mundial, Excélsior, Fin de Semana, Mujer de Hoy, Revista Mujeres, Novedades, El Sol de México, El Universal, and El Zócalo.

Between 1968 and 1969, Mendoza was a fellow at the Centro Mexicano de Escritores (Center of Mexican Writers). Besides writing, Mendoza has taught both set design and journalism, and served as the secretary of the Awards Commission of the Academia Mexicana de Artes y Ciencias Cinematográficas. She has been a member of the Sistema Nacional de Creadores de Arte (SNCA) since 1997. She has worked in television, as a news reporter and served as a politician to the federal 53rd legislature from the state of Guanajuato.

== Death and legacy ==
Mendoza wrote her last column on 23 June 2018 and died 29 June 2018 in Mexico City at the Hospital de Nutrición.

== Awards ==
- 1971 Magda Donato Prize for Con él, conmigo, con nosotros tres
- 1972 National Journalism Prize and Bernal Díaz del Castillo Prize for Crónicas de Chile
- 1973 Award from the Secretariat of Public Education (SEP) for the best television commentary (for the news show 24 hours) on drug addiction
- 1974 Honorable Mention for a series of news reports sent from the USSR to El Universal
- 1975 Francisco Zarco Prize for periodical works of national interest (articles appeared in US magazines Cosmopolitan, Good Housekeeping, and Vanity)
- 1983 Miguel Hidalgo y Costilla Award from the Congress of the State of Guanajuato
- 1984 National Journalism Prize for her program “Un Día un Escritor” on Channel 13 and lifetime achievements
- 2001 National Novel Prize José Rubén Romero for De amor y lujo

== Selected works ==
- Anthology:

La O por lo redondo, México, Grijalbo, 1971.
Trompo a la uña, artículos periodísticos de 1981 a 1989, México, Gobierno del estado de Tabasco, Los que Escriben la Historia, 1989.

- Biography:

Tris de sol (sobre Carmen Serdán), México, Presidencia de la República, 1976.
María Luisa Mendoza. De cuerpo entero: Menguas y contrafuertes (autobiografía), México, UNAM/Corunda, 1991.

- Short Story:

Ojos de papel volando, México, Joaquín Mortiz, 1985

- Essay:

Crítica de la crítica, México, UNAM, 1966.
Qué pasa con el teatro en México?, México, Novaro, 1971.
2 palabras 2 (en colaboración con Edmundo Domínguez Aragonés), México, Presidencia de la República, 1972.
Oiga usted!, Samo, 1973.
Maquinita de hacer ruido (dibujos de Carmen Parra), edición del autor, 1973.
Las cosas, México, Joaquín Mortiz, 1976.
El teatro Juárez, México, Universidad de Guanajuato, 1978.
El retrato de mi gentedad, México, Guanajuato, Instituto Nacional de Antropología e Historia (INAH)/Museo de la Alhóndiga de Granaditas, 1980.

- Screenplay:

Compañero Presidente (sobre Salvador Allende), cortometraje, Festival Cervantino, 1975.
Carta a una amiga, cortometraje, 1973.
Guanajuato a la vista!, cortometraje, Festival Cervantino 1974.
Guanajuato a tiro de sangre, cortometraje, Festival Cervantino 1975.

- Novel:

Con él, conmigo, con nosotros tres, México, Joaquín Mortiz, 1971.
De ausencia, México, Joaquín Mortiz, 1974.
El perro de la escribana, México, Joaquín Mortiz, 1980.

- Journalism:

Crónicas de Chile, México, El Día, 1972.
Allende el bravo (en colaboración con Edmundo Domínguez Aragonés), México, Diana, 1973.
Ra, Re, Ri, Ro, Rusia! la URSS, México, Fondo de Cultura Económica (FCE), 1974.
