= Susanna M. Salter =

American politician and activist

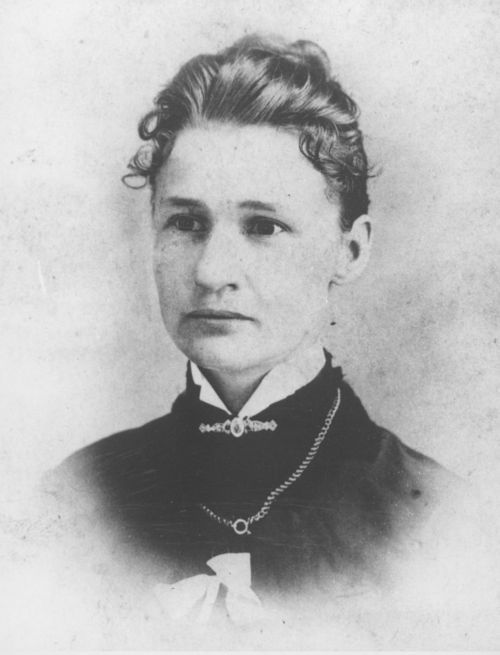
- Salter in 1887

Mayor of Argonia, Kansas
- In office April 4, 1887 – April 8, 1888
- Preceded by: William H. Watson
- Succeeded by: J. S. Baughman

Personal details
- Born: Susanna Madora Kinsey; March 2, 1860 Lamira, Ohio
- Died: March 17, 1961 (aged 101) Norman, Oklahoma
- Resting place: Argonia Cemetery
- Party: Prohibition
- Spouse: Lewis Allison Salter (m. 1880; died 1916)
- Relations: Melville J. Salter (father-in-law), Mary Elizabeth Clark (great niece)
- Children: 9
- Education: Kansas State Agricultural College

Susanna Madora Salter (née Kinsey; March 2, 1860 – March 17, 1961) was an American politician and activist. From 1887 to 1888, she was mayor of Argonia, Kansas, becoming the first woman to serve in that role in the United States and one of the earliest in any U.S. political office. (Note: Nancy Smith of Oskaloosa, Iowa, was elected mayor in 1862 as a protest against the only declared candidate, but chose not to serve.)

== Early life and education ==
Susanna Madora Kinsey was born March 2, 1860, near the unincorporated community of Lamira in Smith Township, Belmont County, Ohio. She was the daughter of Oliver Kinsey and Terissa Ann White Kinsey, the descendants of Quaker colonists from England.

At the age of 12, she moved to Kansas with her parents, settling on an 80-acre (32-hectare) farm near Silver Lake. In 1878, she entered Kansas State Agricultural College (present-day Kansas State University) in Manhattan. She was permitted to skip her freshman year, having taken college-level courses in high school, but was forced to drop out six weeks short of graduation due to illness.

While a student, she met Lewis Allison Salter, an aspiring attorney and the son of former Kansas Lieutenant Governor Melville J. Salter. They married soon thereafter and moved to Argonia, where she was active in the local Woman's Christian Temperance Union and Prohibition Party organizations, and became acquainted with nationally known temperance activist Carrie Nation.

In 1883, she gave birth to the first baby born in Argonia, Francis Argonia Salter. Lewis and Susanna Salter had a total of nine children, one of whom was born during her tenure as mayor and died in infancy. Following the city's incorporation in 1885, her father and husband were elected as the city's first mayor and city clerk, respectively.

== Mayor ==
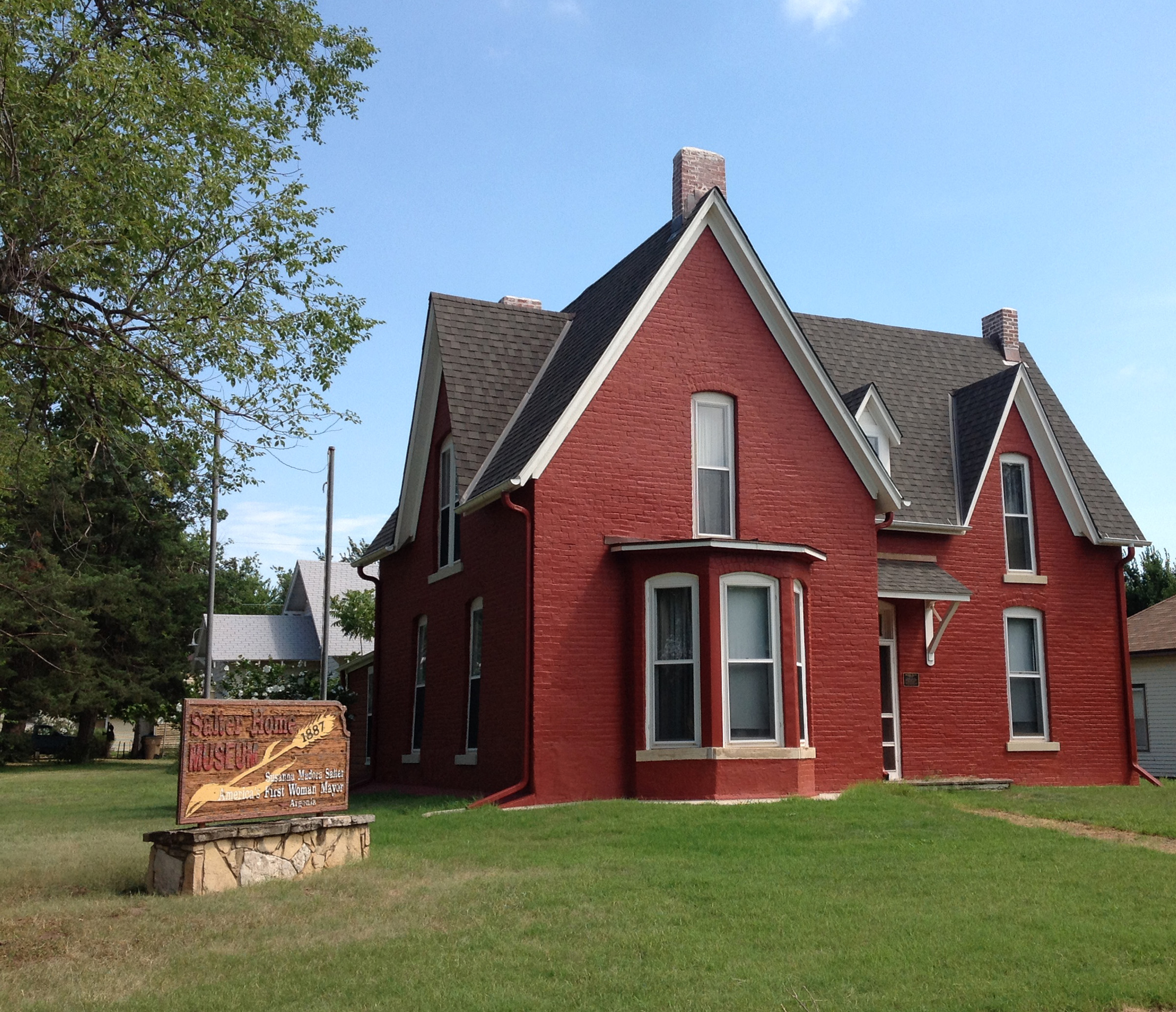
Susanna Salter family home in Argonia, Kansas

Salter was elected mayor of Argonia on April 4, 1887. Her election was a surprise because her name had been placed on a slate of candidates as a stunt by a group of men hoping to secure a loss that would humiliate women and discourage them from participation in politics. Because candidates did not have to be made public before election day, Salter herself did not know she was on the ballot before the polls opened. When, on election day itself, she agreed to accept office if elected, the Women's Christian Temperance Union abandoned its own preferred candidate and voted for Salter en masse. Additionally, the local Republican Party Chairman sent a delegation to her home and confirmed that she would serve and the Republicans agreed to vote for her, helping to secure her election by a two-thirds majority.

Salter did have an advantageous position prior to holding the office of mayor. Her father was the first ever mayor of the town, and her father-in-law served as lieutenant governor of Kansas. Although her term was uneventful, her election generated national interest from the press, sparking a debate regarding the feasibility of other towns following Argonia's lead, which ranged from objections to "petticoat rule" to a "wait-and-see" attitude.

One of the first city council meetings over which the newly elected Mayor Salter presided was attended by a correspondent of the New York Sun. He wrote his story, describing the mayor's dress and hat, and pointing out that she presided with great decorum. He noted that several times she checked irrelevant discussion, demonstrating that she was a good parliamentarian. Other publicity extended to newspapers as far away as Sweden and South Africa. As compensation for her year's service, she was paid one dollar (equivalent to $36 in 2025). After a year in office, she declined to seek reelection.

== Personal life ==
Following her term as mayor, Salter and her family continued to live in Argonia, until 1893 when her husband acquired land on the Cherokee Strip in Alva, Oklahoma (then Oklahoma Territory). Ten years later, they moved to Augusta in Woods County, Oklahoma Territory, where her husband practiced law and established the Headlight newspaper.

They eventually joined the town's settlers in moving to Carmen, Oklahoma. Following her husband's death in 1916, she moved to Norman, Oklahoma, accompanying her younger children during their studies at the University of Oklahoma. She lived in Norman for the remainder of her life and maintained an interest in religious and political matters, but never again sought elected office.

=== Death ===
Salter died on March 17, 1961, in Norman, Oklahoma, two weeks after her 101st birthday, and was buried in Argonia, alongside her husband.

== Honors ==
In 1933, a commemorative bronze plaque was placed in Argonia's public square honoring Salter's service as the first woman mayor in the United States.

The house she lived in during her tenure as mayor was added to the National Register of Historic Places in September 1971.

She is the subject of the children's book A Vote for Susanna: The First Woman Mayor (2021).

== See also ==
- List of first women mayors in the United States
- List of the first women holders of political offices in the United States
