= Salter House =

Historic house in Kansas, United States

- U.S. National Register of Historic Places
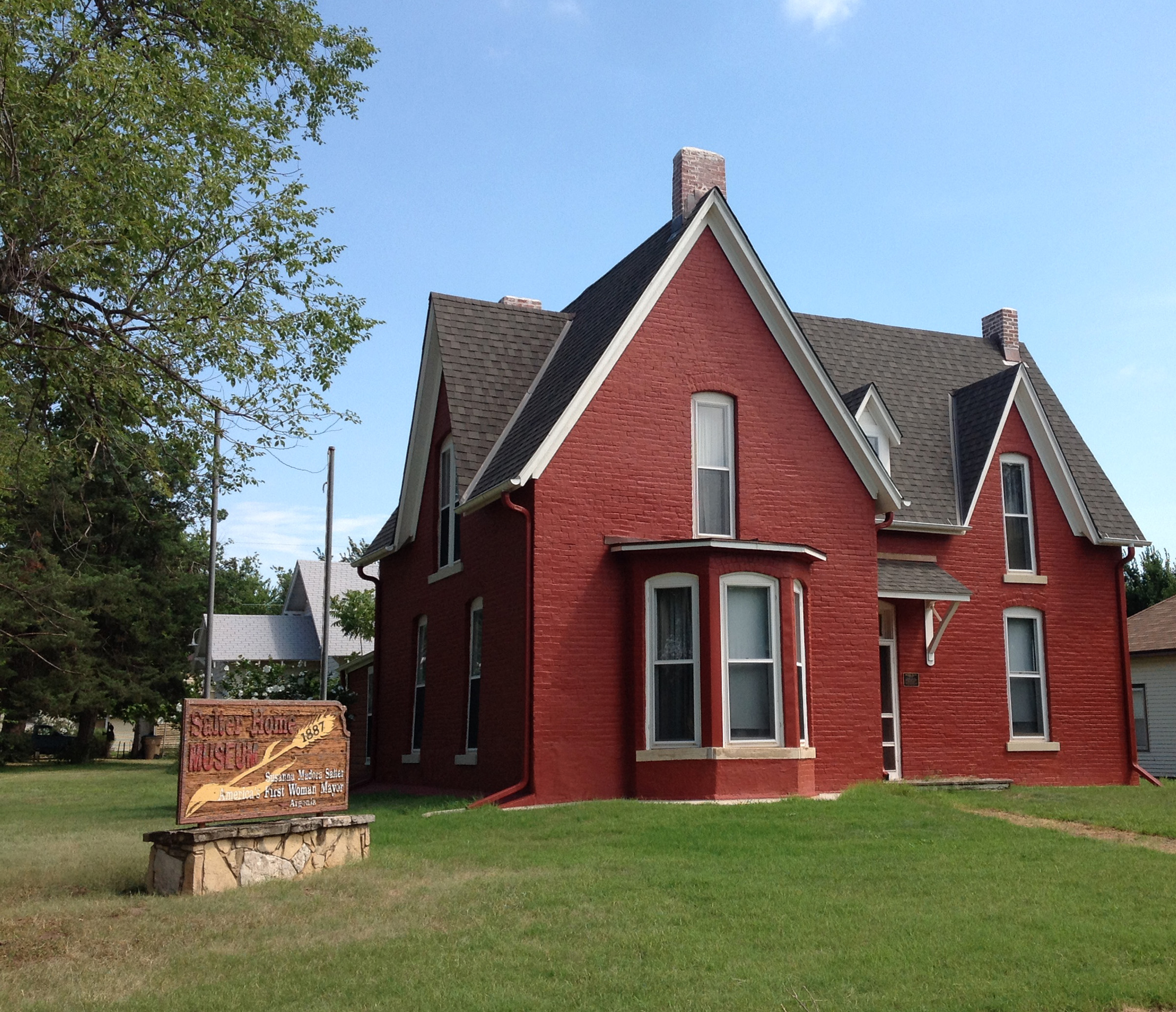

- Location within Kansas Location within the United States
- Location: 220 W. Garfield St., Argonia, Kansas
- Coordinates: 37°15′53″N 97°46′00″W
- Area: 1 acre (0.40 ha)
- Built: 1885
- Built by: Kinsey, Oliver
- NRHP reference No.: 71000332
- Added to NRHP: September 3, 1971

The Salter House in Argonia, Kansas is a historic house at 220 W. Garfield St. which was built in 1884–85. It was listed on the National Register of Historic Places in 1971.

It is a two-story red brick house about 30 by 25 feet (9.1 m × 7.6 m) in plan.

It was the home of Susanna M. Salter (1860–1961) who became internationally famous in 1887 when she became the first woman mayor in the United States.

The house was built by Susanna Salter's father, Oliver Kinsey from bricks he made himself.
