= Milan, Kansas =

City in Sumner County, Kansas

- City
- Location within Sumner County and Kansas

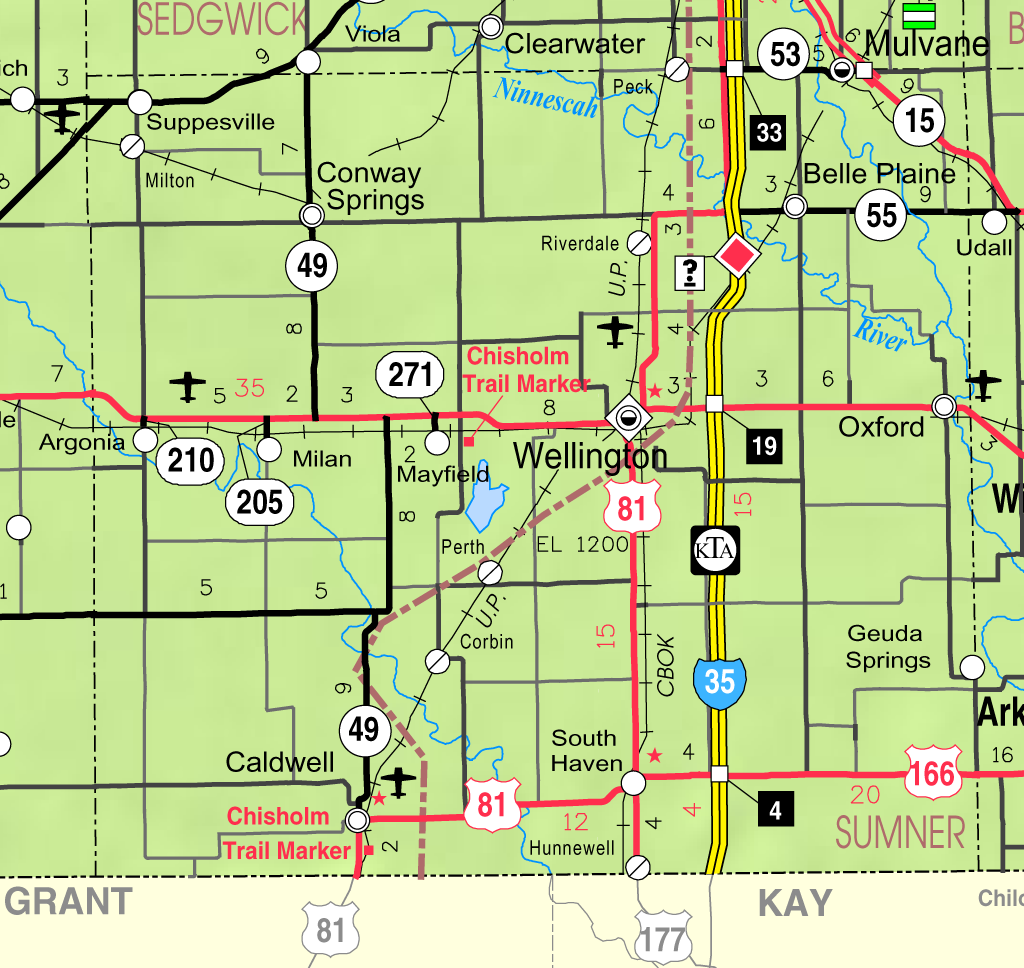
- KDOT map of Sumner County (legend)
- Coordinates: 37°15′27″N 97°40′26″W
- Country: United States
- State: Kansas
- County: Sumner
- Founded: 1880
- Incorporated: 1890
- Named for: Milan, Italy

Area
  - Total: 0.13 sq mi (0.34 km^{2})
  - Land: 0.13 sq mi (0.34 km^{2})
  - Water: 0 sq mi (0.00 km^{2})
- Elevation: 1,224 ft (373 m)

Population (2020)
  - Total: 56
  - Density: 430/sq mi (160/km^{2})
- Time zone: UTC-6 (CST)
  - Summer (DST): UTC-5 (CDT)
- ZIP Code: 67105
- Area code: 620
- FIPS code: 20-46450
- GNIS ID: 2395321

Milan is a city in Sumner County, Kansas, United States. As of the 2020 census, the population of the city was 56.

== History ==
Milan was founded in 1880. It was named after Milan in Italy.

== Geography ==
According to the United States Census Bureau, the city has a total area of 0.13 square miles (0.34 km^{2}), all land.

=== 2014 Earthquake ===
A M4.9 earthquake occurred approximately 2.5 miles (4 km) east-northeast of Milan, Kansas on November 12, 2014. The temblor occurred in a region previously devoid of significant seismic activity and followed rapid increases of fluid injection by multiple wastewater injection wells in the vicinity of the fault.

== Demographics ==
Historical population
Census	Pop.	Note	%±
1890	229		—
1910	240		—
1920	222		−7.5%
1930	198		−10.8%
1940	224		13.1%
1950	165		−26.3%
1960	144		−12.7%
1970	162		12.5%
1980	135		−16.7%
1990	109		−19.3%
2000	137		25.7%
2010	82		−40.1%
2020	56		−31.7%
U.S. Decennial Census

=== 2020 census ===
The 2020 United States census counted 56 people, 27 households, and 20 families in Milan. The population density was 424.2 per square mile (163.8/km^{2}). There were 47 housing units at an average density of 356.1 per square mile (137.5/km^{2}). The racial makeup was 83.93% (47) white or European American (83.93% non-Hispanic white), 1.79% (1) black or African-American, 0.0% (0) Native American or Alaska Native, 5.36% (3) Asian, 0.0% (0) Pacific Islander or Native Hawaiian, 0.0% (0) from other races, and 8.93% (5) from two or more races. Hispanic or Latino of any race was 0.0% (0) of the population.

Of the 27 households, 44.4% had children under the age of 18; 51.9% were married couples living together; 3.7% had a female householder with no spouse or partner present. 22.2% of households consisted of individuals and 11.1% had someone living alone who was 65 years of age or older. The average household size was 2.4 and the average family size was 3.1. The percent of those with a bachelor's degree or higher was estimated to be 10.7% of the population.

28.6% of the population was under the age of 18, 1.8% from 18 to 24, 10.7% from 25 to 44, 25.0% from 45 to 64, and 33.9% who were 65 years of age or older. The median age was 52.0 years. For every 100 females, there were 80.6 males. For every 100 females ages 18 and older, there were 81.8 males.

The 2016–2020 5-year American Community Survey estimates show that the median household income was $76,250 (with a margin of error of +/- $45,443) and the median family income was $77,917 (+/- $46,808). Males had a median income of $41,146 (+/- $10,495) versus $36,397 (+/- $9,808) for females. The median income for those above 16 years old was $37,206 (+/- $11,351). Approximately, 0.0% of families and 5.1% of the population were below the poverty line, including 0.0% of those under the age of 18 and 0.0% of those ages 65 or over.

=== 2010 census ===
As of the census of 2010, there were 82 people, 36 households, and 26 families residing in the city. The population density was 630.8 inhabitants per square mile (243.6/km^{2}). There were 55 housing units at an average density of 423.1 per square mile (163.4/km^{2}). The racial makeup of the city was 93.9% White, 4.9% from other races, and 1.2% from two or more races. Hispanic or Latino of any race were 1.2% of the population.

There were 36 households, of which 27.8% had children under the age of 18 living with them, 61.1% were married couples living together, 11.1% had a female householder with no husband present, and 27.8% were non-families. 22.2% of all households were made up of individuals, and 11.1% had someone living alone who was 65 years of age or older. The average household size was 2.28 and the average family size was 2.65.

The median age in the city was 41 years. 22% of residents were under the age of 18; 8.5% were between the ages of 18 and 24; 20.8% were from 25 to 44; 25.6% were from 45 to 64; and 23.2% were 65 years of age or older. The gender makeup of the city was 50.0% male and 50.0% female.

=== 2000 census ===
As of the census of 2000, there were 137 people, 51 households, and 36 families residing in the city. The population density was 1,070.1 inhabitants per square mile (413.2/km^{2}). There were 61 housing units at an average density of 476.5 per square mile (184.0/km^{2}). The racial makeup of the city was 96.35% White, 1.46% Native American, 2.19% from other races. Hispanic or Latino of any race were 2.19% of the population.

There were 51 households, out of which 29.4% had children under the age of 18 living with them, 58.8% were married couples living together, 13.7% had a female householder with no husband present, and 27.5% were non-families. 21.6% of all households were made up of individuals, and 11.8% had someone living alone who was 65 years of age or older. The average household size was 2.69 and the average family size was 3.24.

In the city, the population was spread out, with 30.7% under the age of 18, 8.0% from 18 to 24, 23.4% from 25 to 44, 27.0% from 45 to 64, and 10.9% who were 65 years of age or older. The median age was 36 years. For every 100 females, there were 114.1 males. For every 100 females age 18 and over, there were 97.9 males.

The median income for a household in the city was $33,750, and the median income for a family was $39,583. Males had a median income of $35,833 versus $16,964 for females. The per capita income for the city was $13,236. There were 11.4% of families and 6.2% of the population living below the poverty line, including no under eighteens and 14.3% of those over 64.

== Economy ==
As of December 2011, there are currently no businesses in Milan. Operations were suspended indefinitely at the United States Post Office on November 29, 2011. Previous businesses in Milan included a grocery store and a restaurant. Milan Grocery was open sporadically during the 1970s and 1980s. Opal's Cafe was open for business during much of the 1980s.

== Education ==
The community is served by Argonia USD 359 public school district.

Milan High School was closed through school unification. The Milan High School mascot was Dragons.
