= Aragon (disambiguation) =

Aragon is a Spanish autonomous community.

Aragon, or Aragón may also refer to:

== Places ==
=== The Iberian Peninsula ===
- County of Aragon, a medieval county in Spain
- Kingdom of Aragon, a medieval kingdom in Spain
- Aragón (river), a tributary of the river Ebro

=== The United States of America ===
- Aragon, Georgia
- Aragon, New Mexico, the site of Fort Tularosa
- Aragon High School, in San Mateo, California

=== Other places ===
- Crown of Aragon, a Mediterranean empire during the Middle Ages
- Aragon, Aude, a commune in the Aude département, France
- Aragon, Antioquia, a place in Colombia

== Ships ==
- Spanish cruiser Aragón, a late 19th-century Spanish Navy warship
- HMT Aragon, a troopship, previously the British ocean liner RMS Aragon

== People ==
- Jesusita Aragón (1908–2005), American midwife
- Louis Aragon (1897–1982), French poet, novelist and editor
- Maria Aragon (born 2000), Canadian singer
- Raoul Aragon (1947 or 1948–2026), Filipino actor
- Catherine of Aragon (1485–1536), first wife of Henry VIII
- List of Aragonese monarchs

== Other uses ==
- "Aragon", a composition by Brian Eno on the album Music for Films
- Aragón TV, a radio and television network in Aragon
- Orquesta Aragón, Cuban musical band

== Transit ==
- Aragón metro station, a station in Line 5 in Mexico City
- Bosque de Aragón metro station, a station in Line B in Mexico City
- Plaza Aragón metro station, a station in Ecatepec, State of Mexico
- San Juan de Aragón (Mexico City Metrobús, Line 5), a BRT station in Line 5 of the bus system
- San Juan de Aragón (Mexico City Metrobús, Line 6), a BRT station in Line 6 of the bus system
- Pueblo San Juan de Aragón (Mexico City Metrobús), a BRT station in Line 6 of the bus system
- Villa de Aragón metro station, a station in Mexico City
  - Villa de Aragón (Mexico City Metrobús), a BRT station in Line 6 of the bus system servicing the metro station
- Aragó (Metrovalencia), formerly Aragón, in Valencia, Spain

== See also ==
- Aragon Ballroom (disambiguation)
- Aragorn (disambiguation)
- Eragon, the first book in the Inheritance Cycle series by Christopher Paolini
- Aragog, a beast in the Harry Potter series
- Aragona, an Italian commune
- Aragonite, a mineral
