= Aragorn (disambiguation) =

Aragorn is a character in J. R. R. Tolkien's The Lord of the Rings.

Aragorn may also refer to:

- Aragorn (Marvel Comics), a fictional winged horse
- Aragorn (horse), a thoroughbred racehorse
- Aragorn! (1970–2020), anarchist theorist

== See also ==
- Aragon (disambiguation)
