= Argonia, Kansas =

City in Sumner County, Kansas

- City
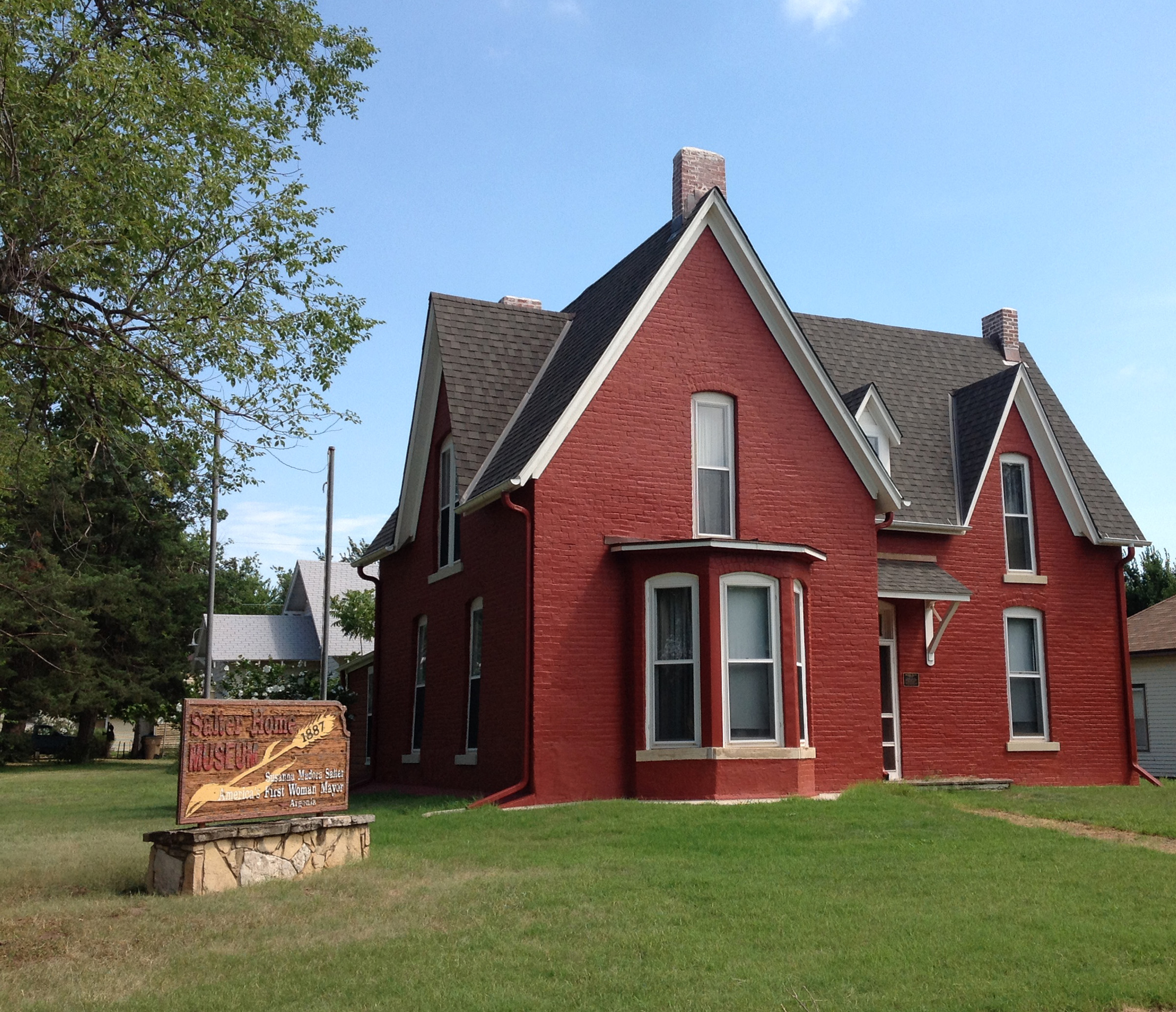
- Home of Susanna M. Salter, first female mayor in the United States

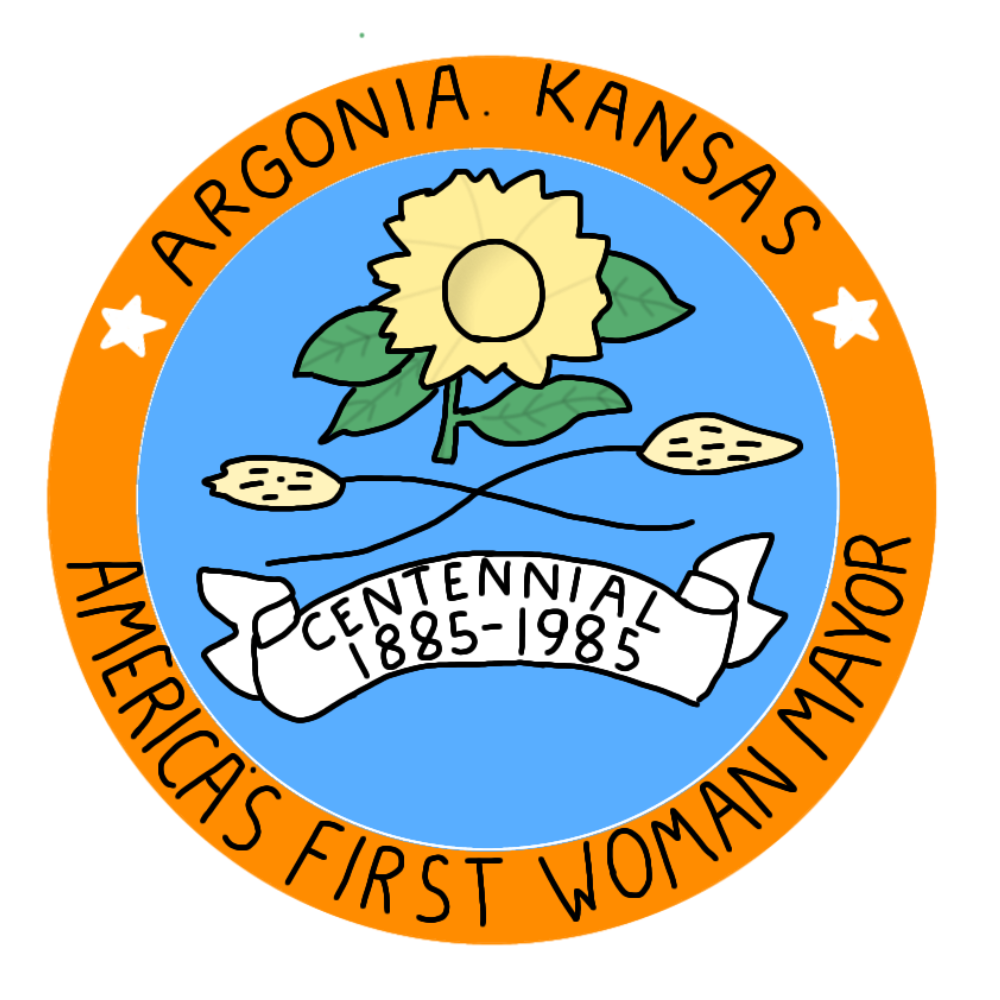
- Seal

- Location within Sumner County and Kansas

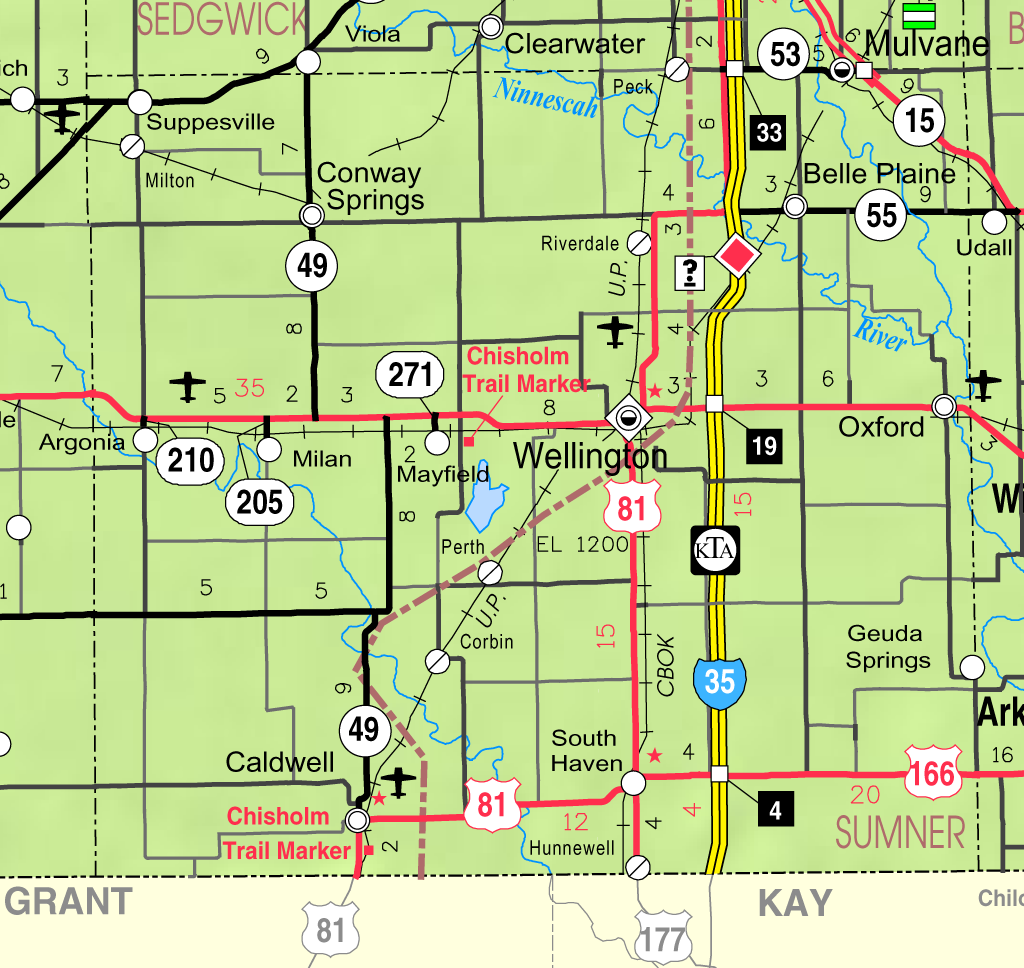
- KDOT map of Sumner County (legend)
- Coordinates: 37°16′04″N 97°45′47″W
- Country: United States
- State: Kansas
- County: Sumner
- Founded: 1881
- Incorporated: 1885
- Named for: Argo

Area
  - Total: 0.70 sq mi (1.82 km^{2})
  - Land: 0.70 sq mi (1.82 km^{2})
  - Water: 0 sq mi (0.00 km^{2})
- Elevation: 1,257 ft (383 m)

Population (2020)
  - Total: 456
  - Density: 649/sq mi (251/km^{2})
- Time zone: UTC-6 (CST)
  - Summer (DST): UTC-5 (CDT)
- ZIP Code: 67004
- Area code: 620
- FIPS code: 20-02250
- GNIS ID: 2393981
- Website: cityofargonia.com

Argonia is a city in Sumner County, Kansas, United States. As of the 2020 census, the population of the city was 456.

== History ==
Argonia was founded in 1881. It was named for the ship Argo in Greek mythology. In 1887, Susanna M. Salter became the first woman to win political office in United States history when she was elected Mayor of Argonia as a member of the Prohibition Party.

== Geography ==
According to the United States Census Bureau, the city has a total area of 0.66 square miles (1.71 km^{2}), all land.

== Demographics ==
Historical population
Census	Pop.	Note	%±
1890	376		—
1900	309		−17.8%
1910	466		50.8%
1920	478		2.6%
1930	546		14.2%
1940	532		−2.6%
1950	562		5.6%
1960	553		−1.6%
1970	591		6.9%
1980	587		−0.7%
1990	529		−9.9%
2000	534		0.9%
2010	501		−6.2%
2020	456		−9.0%
U.S. Decennial Census

=== 2020 census ===
The 2020 United States census counted 456 people, 189 households, and 120 families in Argonia. The population density was 653.3 per square mile (252.2/km^{2}). There were 229 housing units at an average density of 328.1 per square mile (126.7/km^{2}). The racial makeup was 90.13% (411) white or European American (90.13% non-Hispanic white), 0.66% (3) black or African-American, 1.1% (5) Native American or Alaska Native, 0.0% (0) Asian, 0.0% (0) Pacific Islander or Native Hawaiian, 0.66% (3) from other races, and 7.46% (34) from two or more races. Hispanic or Latino of any race was 1.54% (7) of the population.

Of the 189 households, 35.4% had children under the age of 18; 47.1% were married couples living together; 23.8% had a female householder with no spouse or partner present. 33.3% of households consisted of individuals and 14.8% had someone living alone who was 65 years of age or older. The average household size was 2.4 and the average family size was 3.0. The percent of those with a bachelor's degree or higher was estimated to be 12.7% of the population.

28.9% of the population was under the age of 18, 4.4% from 18 to 24, 21.1% from 25 to 44, 27.9% from 45 to 64, and 17.8% who were 65 years of age or older. The median age was 39.5 years. For every 100 females, there were 108.2 males. For every 100 females ages 18 and older, there were 106.4 males.

The 2016–2020 5-year American Community Survey estimates show that the median household income was $58,438 (with a margin of error of +/- $15,400) and the median family income was $72,708 (+/- $14,879). Males had a median income of $40,167 (+/- $20,011) versus $40,833 (+/- $29,427) for females. The median income for those above 16 years old was $40,278 (+/- $10,743). Approximately, 2.9% of families and 8.1% of the population were below the poverty line, including 7.3% of those under the age of 18 and 1.1% of those ages 65 or over.

=== 2010 census ===
As of the census of 2010, there were 501 people, 216 households, and 135 families living in the city. The population density was 759.1 inhabitants per square mile (293.1/km^{2}). There were 244 housing units at an average density of 369.7 per square mile (142.7/km^{2}). The racial makeup of the city was 96.6% White, 0.8% African American, 0.6% Native American, and 2.0% from two or more races. Hispanic or Latino of any race were 1.6% of the population.

There were 216 households, of which 32.9% had children under the age of 18 living with them, 44.4% were married couples living together, 13.0% had a female householder with no husband present, 5.1% had a male householder with no wife present, and 37.5% were non-families. 33.8% of all households were made up of individuals, and 14.8% had someone living alone who was 65 years of age or older. The average household size was 2.32 and the average family size was 2.96.

The median age in the city was 38.6 years. 25.9% of residents were under the age of 18; 10.5% were between the ages of 18 and 24; 22.2% were from 25 to 44; 22.6% were from 45 to 64; and 19% were 65 years of age or older. The gender makeup of the city was 47.5% male and 52.5% female.

=== 2000 census ===
As of the census of 2000, there were 534 people, 225 households, and 146 families living in the city. The population density was 818.4 inhabitants per square mile (316.0/km^{2}). There were 255 housing units at an average density of 390.8 per square mile (150.9/km^{2}). The racial makeup of the city was 96.82% White, 0.37% African American, 0.37% from other races, and 2.43% from two or more races. Hispanic or Latino of any race were 0.19% of the population.

There were 225 households, out of which 25.8% had children under the age of 18 living with them, 54.7% were married couples living together, 8.9% had a female householder with no husband present, and 34.7% were non-families. 34.2% of all households were made up of individuals, and 22.7% had someone living alone who was 65 years of age or older. The average household size was 2.37 and the average family size was 3.04.

In the city, the population was spread out, with 26.4% under the age of 18, 6.9% from 18 to 24, 22.5% from 25 to 44, 21.7% from 45 to 64, and 22.5% who were 65 years of age or older. The median age was 41 years. For every 100 females, there were 94.2 males. For every 100 females age 18 and over, there were 92.6 males.

The median income for a household in the city was $30,125, and the median income for a family was $38,625. Males had a median income of $30,938 versus $19,688 for females. The per capita income for the city was $16,060. About 8.9% of families and 8.8% of the population were below the poverty line, including 8.5% of those under age 18 and 13.4% of those age 65 or over.

== Education ==
The community is served by Argonia USD 359 public school district.

The Argonia Red Raiders of Argonia High School won the following Kansas State High School championships:

- 1969 Boys Basketball - Class 1A
- 2011 Girls Basketball - Class 1A-II

== Notable people ==
- Susanna M. Salter was elected mayor of Argonia in 1887, becoming the first woman elected mayor in the United States.
