= Aragon Ballroom =

Aragon Ballroom may refer to:

- Aragon Ballroom (Chicago), Illinois
- Aragon Ballroom (Ocean Park, Santa Monica, California), now defunct, was on Lick Pier in this district
- Aragon Ballroom (Rancho Bernardo, San Diego, California), built in 2007, at the Rancho Bernardo Inn golf resort
