= USS Argonne (1918) =

Japanese-built cargo steamship

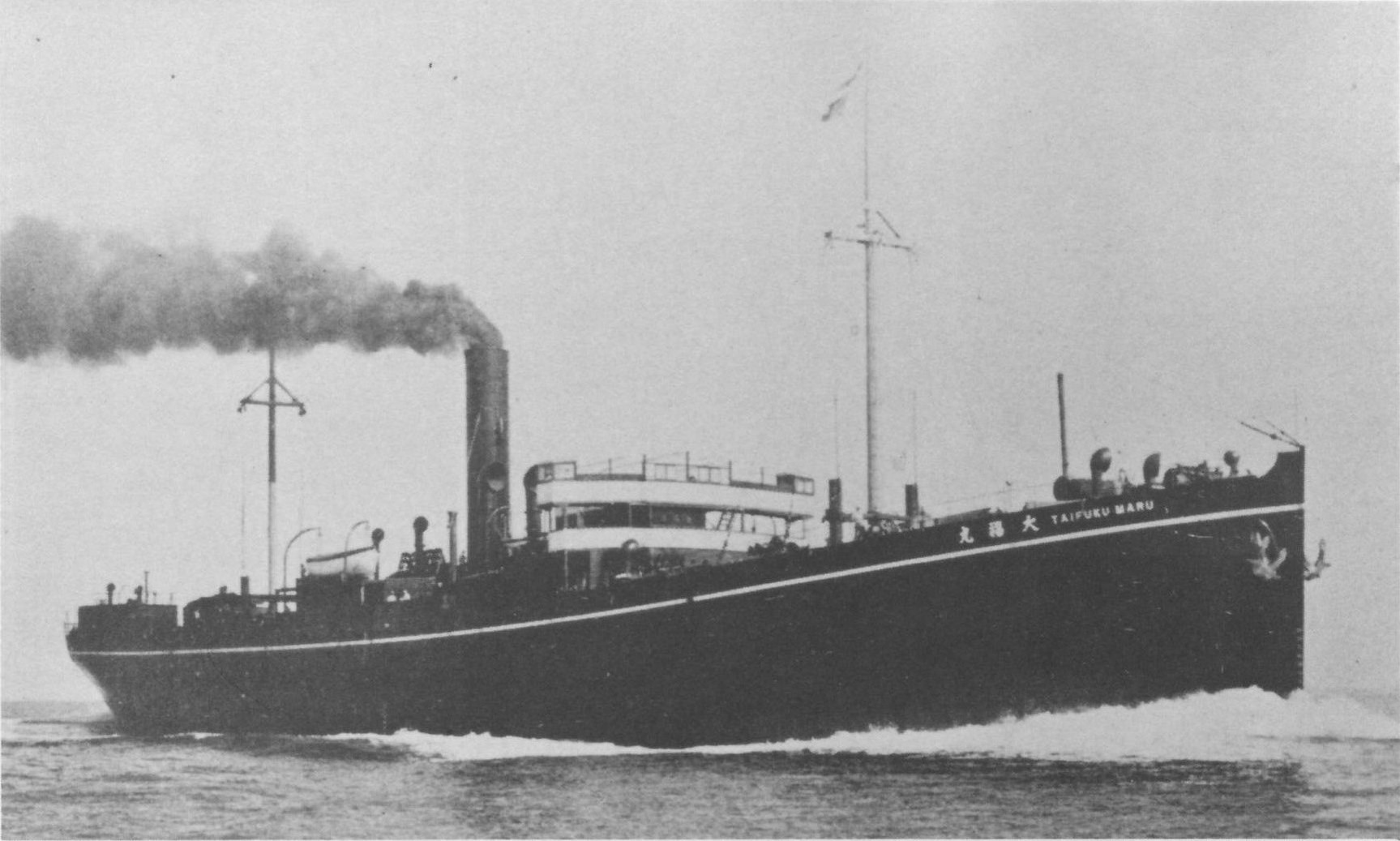
- Taifuku Maru No.1 on her sea trials

History
- Name: 1916: Taifuku Maru No.1; 1917: Argonne; 1922: Calonne; 1934: Wally
- Owner: 1917: Argonne SS Co; 1922: Cie Française de Marine et de Commerce; 1926: SA "Colonne"; 1930: "Calonne" SARL; 1934: INSA Industrie Navali SA
- Operator: 1917: States Marine & Commerce Co; 1926: Cie Française de Marine et de Commerce; 1930: A Grosos & G Anduze-Faris
- Port of registry: 1917: (United States) New York; 1922: (France) Toulon; 1930: (France) Le Havre; 1934: (Kingdom of Italy) Genoa
- Builder: Kawasaki Dockyard, Kobe
- Yard number: 391
- Launched: 12 September 1916
- Completed: December 1916
- Commissioned: into US Navy, 19 Oct 1918
- Decommissioned: from US Navy, 30 Jan 1919
- Stricken: from US Navy, 30 Jan 1919
- Identification: US official number 214840; 1917: code letters LGPH; 1922: code letters OVUP
- Fate: scrapped 1935

General characteristics
- Class & type: Taifuku Maru-class cargo ship
- Tonnage: 5,870 GRT, 4,334 NRT
- Length: 385.0 ft (117.3 m)
- Beam: 51.0 ft (15.5 m)
- Draft: 27 ft 1 in (8.3 m)
- Depth: 36.0 ft (11.0 m)
- Decks: 2
- Installed power: 391 NHP, 3,500 ihp
- Propulsion: 1 × triple-expansion engine; 1 × screw
- Speed: 10 knots (19 km/h)
- Complement: in US Navy, 78
- Armament: in US Navy: 1 × 6-inch/50-caliber gun; 1 × 6-pounder gun

USS Argonne was a cargo steamship that was built in Japan in 1916 as Taifuku Maru No. 1. She served in the United States Navy from October 1918 to January 1919. In 1922 a French company bought her and renamed her Calonne. In 1922 an Italian company bought her and renamed her Wally. She was scrapped in Italy in 1935.

== Building and ownership ==
Kawasaki Dockyard in Kobe built Taifuku Maru No. 1 as yard number 391. She was launched on 12 September 1916 and completed that December. She was the first member of what became the Taifuku Maru-class of cargo ship. Kawasaki continued to build ships to this design until 1921. The total number built was 75.

Taifuku Maru No. 1's registered length was 385.0 ft (117.3 m), her beam was 51.0 ft (15.5 m), her depth was 36.0 ft (11.0 m) and her draft was 27 ft 1 in (8.3 m). Her tonnages were 5,870 GRT and 4,334 NRT.

She had a single screw, driven by a Kawasaki three-cylinder triple-expansion engine. It was rated at 391 NHP or 3,500 ihp, and gave her a speed of 10 knots (19 km/h).

On 28 December 1916 the Argonne Steam Ship Company, Inc bought Taifuku Maru No. 1, renamed her Argonne, and registered her in New York. This seems to have been a one-ship company acting for the States Marine & Commerce Company, Inc, which managed her. Her US official number was 214840 and her code letters were LGPH.

== First World War service ==
In January 1918 the Newport News Shipbuilding and Dry Dock Company overhauled Argonne and she was given an Armed Guard. On 19 October 1918 the US Navy acquired Argonne at Norfolk, Virginia, and commissioned her the same day as USS Argonne. She was bareboat chartered for the United States Army account of the Naval Overseas Transportation Service.

One week after the Armistice of 11 November 1918, Argonne left for France. She landed commissary stores, mules, and horses at Bordeaux, and returned to Norfolk on 17 December 1918. This was her only active service voyage for the Navy.

On 30 January 1919 Argonne was decommissioned at Norfolk and returned via the United States Shipping Board to her owners.

== Calonne ==
In 1922 the Compagnie Française de Marine et de Commerce bought Argonne, renamed her Calonne, and registered her in Toulon. Her code letters were OVUP. In 1926 her ownership was restructured with a Société Anonyme "Calonne", but still managed by the Compagnie Française de Marine et de Commerce. By 1930 her owner was "Calonne" Société à responsabilité limitée, her managers were A Grosos and G Anduze-Faris, and she was registered in Le Havre.

== Wally ==
In 1934 INSA Industrie Navali SA bought Calonne, renamed her Wally, and registered her in Genoa. On 11 May 1935 she arrived in La Spezia to be scrapped.

== Bibliography ==
- Lloyd's Register of Shipping. Vol. II.–Steamers. London: Lloyd's Register of Shipping. 1917 – via Internet Archive.
- Lloyd's Register of Shipping. Vol. II.–Steamers. London: Lloyd's Register of Shipping. 1921 – via Internet Archive.
- Lloyd's Register of Shipping. Vol. II.–Steamers & Motor Vessels. London: Lloyd's Register of Shipping. 1922 – via Internet Archive.
- Lloyd's Register of Shipping. Vol. II.–Steamers & Motorships. London: Lloyd's Register of Shipping. 1926 – via Internet Archive.
- Lloyd's Register of Shipping (PDF). Vol. II.–Steamers and Motorships of 300 tons gross and over. London: Lloyd's Register of Shipping. 1930 – via Southampton City Council.
- Lloyd's Register of Shipping (PDF). Vol. II.–Steamers and Motorships of 300 tons gross and over. London: Lloyd's Register of Shipping. 1934 – via Southampton City Council.
- Silverstone, Paul (2006). The New Navy, 1883–1922. The US Navy Warship. Routledge. ISBN 978-0415978712.
