= Aragonese =

Aragonese or Aragones may refer to:

- Something related to Aragon, an autonomous community and former kingdom in Spain
- the Aragonese people, those originating from or living in the historical region of Aragon, in north-eastern Spain
- the Aragonese language, a Romance language currently spoken in the northernmost area of Aragon
  - the Navarro-Aragonese language, a Romance language spoken in the Middle Ages in parts of the Ebro basin and Middle Pyrenees
- Aragonese cuisine, refers to the typical dishes and ingredients of cuisine in the Aragon region of Spain
- the Aragonese grape, also known as Grenache
- the Aragones grape, also known as Alicante Bouschet
- the music of Aragon
- the medieval Kingdom of Aragon
  - the medieval Crown of Aragon, which included the Kingdom of Aragon as a constituent part
  - the list of Aragonese monarchs from the medieval Kingdom of Aragon
- Aragonese Castle on the Italian island of Ischia, also known as Castello Aragonese
- the Aragonese Crusade, part of the War of the Sicilian Vespers
- Aragonés (surname)
