= Argonia USD 359 =

Public school district in Argonia, Kansas

Address
- 202 E. Allen St Argonia, Kansas, 67004; United States
- Coordinates: 37°16′9″N 97°45′49″W

District information
- Type: Public
- Grades: K to 12
- Schools: 2

Other information
- Website: www.usd359.org

Argonia High School

Location
- 504 North Pine Street; Argonia, (Sumner County), Kansas 67004; United States

Information
- Type: Public high school
- Principal: Luke Greenwood
- Staff: 10.14 (FTE)
- Enrollment: 72 (2023-24)
- Student to teacher ratio: 7.10
- Colors: Red and white
- Nickname: Raiders
- Website: Argonia High School

Argonia USD 359 is a public unified school district headquartered in Argonia, Kansas, United States. The district includes the communities of Argonia, Milan, and nearby rural areas.

== Schools ==
The school district operates the following schools:

- Argonia Jr/Sr High School
- Argonia Elementary School

== History ==
In May 2023, USD 359 announced that it would be going to a 4-day school week for the 2023-2024 school year.

== See also ==
- Kansas State Department of Education
- Kansas State High School Activities Association
- List of high schools in Kansas
- List of unified school districts in Kansas
