= Argon (1908 automobile) =

The Argon was an English automobile made by Grannaway Engineering Co, Earls Court, London S.W. in 1908. It was a fairly large touring car using a 25 hp 6-cylinder Coventry-Simplex engine. It was priced at 750 pounds. In 1905, the company was said to be planning a car deemed the Grannaway, but it is not clear whether this ever came to fruition.
