= Argonne (automobile) =

Defunct American motor vehicle manufacturer

The Argonne was an American automobile manufactured from 1919 to 1920 by the Jersey City Machine Co. of Jersey City, New Jersey.

Only 24 were produced before the company folded. The prototype car was a sports roadster with an aluminum body crafted by the Schutte Body Co. of Lancaster, Pennsylvania. It was powered by an inline-four Buda engine. A Rochester-Duesenberg power plant was also available. Production models included a roadster on a 118-inch (3,000 mm) wheelbase, and some sources list an open Tourer model on a 132-inch (3,400 mm) wheelbase.

The marque featured a sharply pointed radiator similar to that found on the Austro-Daimler.
