= Ergon =

Ergon may refer to:

- Ergon, alien from the Doctor Who serial Arc of Infinity
- Ergon chair, designed by Bill Stumpf for Herman Miller in the 1970s
- Ergon, concept from Aristotle's Nicomachean Ethics that is most often translated as function, task, or work
- Ergon, Inc., petroleum company based in Jackson, Mississippi
- Ergon Energy, electricity company owned by the Government of Queensland

== See also ==
- Potentiality and actuality (Ancient Greek: ἔργον)
- Erg (unit), unit of energy
- Tri-Ergon, sound production technology
