= Aragon, Antioquia =

Aragon
- Populated center
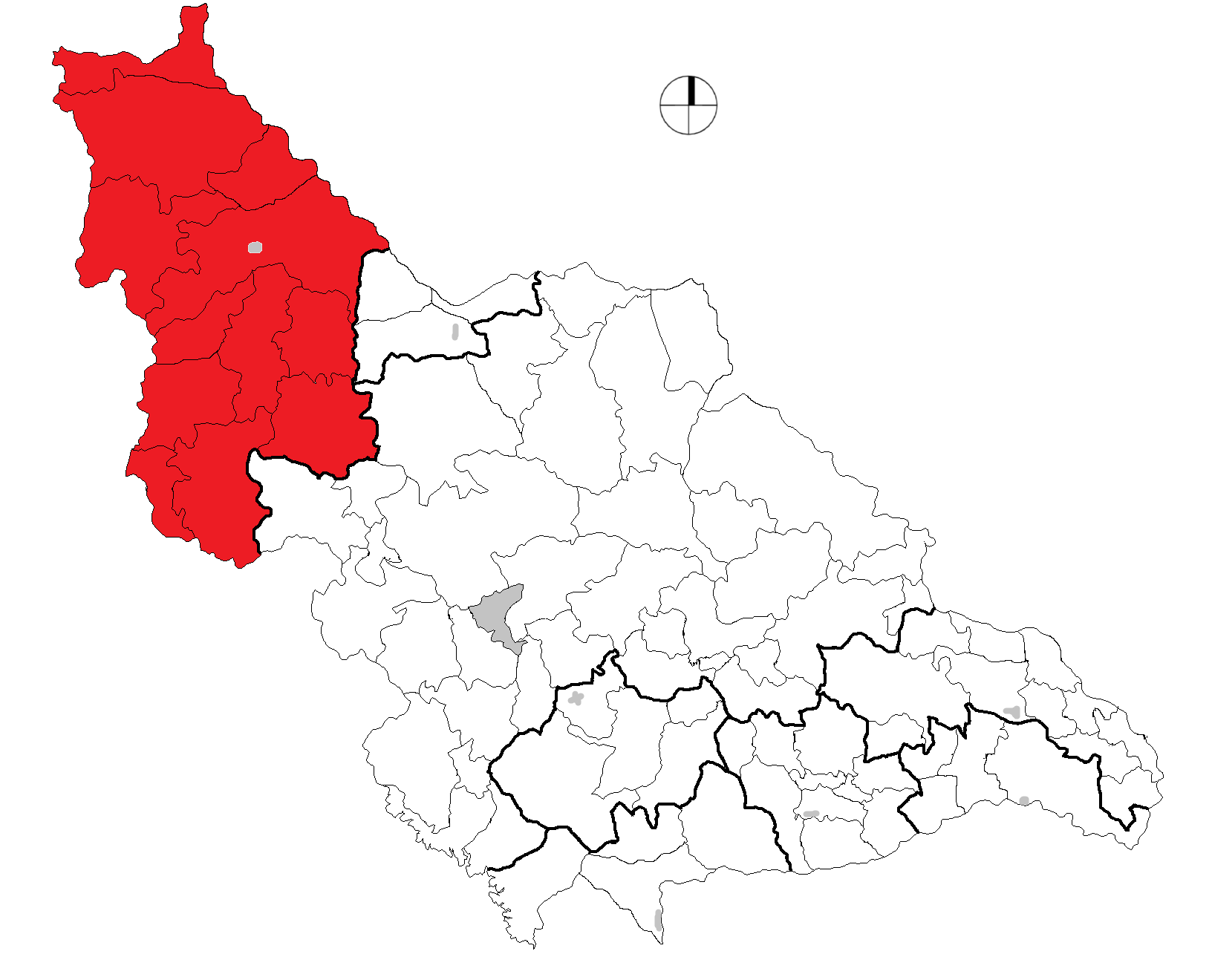
- Location in the municipality of Santa Rosa de Osos in the Antioquia Department of Colombia

- Location in Colombia
- Coordinates: 06°46′N 75°33′W
- Country: Colombia
- Department: Antioquia Department
- Municipality: Santa Rosa de Osos
- Elevation: 2,600 m (8,500 ft)

Population (2015)
  - Total: 4,256
- Time zone: UTC-5 (Colombia Standard Time)

Aragon is populated center of Colombia of Santa Rosa de Osos, Antioquia, Colombia . Located north of the municipality. The urban area and centrality of the township is approximately 32 kilometers from the city of Santa Rosa de Osos. It is characterized for being one of the highest towns that Antioquia has, for this and other conditions it is also one of the urban sites with the coldest climate in the department, in February 2012 temperatures of −3.2 °C were reported and in part of the rural area the temperature can drop even further.

Aragon has countless natural and cultural attractions like the rest of Santa Rosa de Osos, among them is the Parish Temple "Nuestra Señora Del Carmen" built in the 20th century and designed by the Belgian architect Agustín Goovaerts, La Gruta De Nuestra Señora de Lourdes (located on an islet of the Rio Grande .), cloud forests and oak forests. In addition to the Grande and Chocó rivers .

The township presents a big participation of the community in its different festivals such as: the traditional altar of San Isidro that is the last weekend of June, the festivities of the Virgen del Carmen that are on July 16, The festivities of river of Aragon that are in the first weekend of November and communal Christmas, among other activities.

== History and Geography ==
Aragon was one of the first sites in Santa Rosa de Osos where population was established in the eighteenth century; the site was named in ancient times as Tierradentro and due to the gold richness of the region the chapel was built (which would later be replaced by the monumental Church it currently has) and a well-defined population nucleus was established that would later go on to take the name of Aragon.

It is erected as a township by Agreement No. 22 (July 12, 1912). Santa Rosa de Osos Municipal Council.

Within its hydrography; Aragon is crossed from north to south by the Rio Grande, which originates in the San Bernardo path and runs through the urban head of the township; reason why currently called "Fiestas Del Río", an event that brings together locals and strangers; in addition to innumerable tributaries, among them the Quebrada Del Medio, the Chocó river and the San Andrés river that flows directly into the Cauca river near the El Valle district of the municipality of Toledo .

In Aragon are the highs of San Bernardo and Santa Isabel, high altitude points within the plateau, the first, the highest summit of Santa Rosa de Osos.

The territory that the government of Santa Rosa de Osos administers from the centrality of Aragon, limits to the north with the municipality of San Andrés de Cuerquia, to the east with the municipality of Yarumal, to the south with the sidewalks administered directly by the urban capital of Santa Rosa and to the west with the municipalities of Entrerríos, Belmira and San José de la Montaña.

== Climate ==
Aragon has a cold subtropical highland climate (Cfb). It has moderately heavy rainfall year-round.

Climate data for Aragon
Month	Jan	Feb	Mar	Apr	May	Jun	Jul	Aug	Sep	Oct	Nov	Dec	Year
Mean daily maximum °C (°F)	18.3 (64.9)	18.6 (65.5)	18.5 (65.3)	18.3 (64.9)	18.5 (65.3)	18.2 (64.8)	18.0 (64.4)	18.1 (64.6)	18.1 (64.6)	17.8 (64.0)	17.9 (64.2)	18.1 (64.6)	18.2 (64.8)
Daily mean °C (°F)	13.0 (55.4)	13.1 (55.6)	13.2 (55.8)	13.5 (56.3)	13.8 (56.8)	13.7 (56.7)	13.5 (56.3)	13.5 (56.3)	13.4 (56.1)	13.2 (55.8)	13.1 (55.6)	13.1 (55.6)	13.3 (56.0)
Mean daily minimum °C (°F)	6.2 (43.2)	6.4 (43.5)	7.2 (45.0)	8.5 (47.3)	9.1 (48.4)	8.4 (47.1)	7.8 (46.0)	7.7 (45.9)	8.0 (46.4)	8.0 (46.4)	7.7 (45.9)	6.9 (44.4)	7.7 (45.8)
Average rainfall mm (inches)	54.9 (2.16)	86.6 (3.41)	132.2 (5.20)	193.4 (7.61)	246.6 (9.71)	165.8 (6.53)	168.0 (6.61)	157.1 (6.19)	197.9 (7.79)	234.5 (9.23)	188.6 (7.43)	107.3 (4.22)	1,932.9 (76.09)
Average rainy days	9	11	15	20	23	20	20	20	21	24	20	14	217
Average relative humidity (%)	86	87	87	87	87	86	85	85	86	87	88	87	87
Mean monthly sunshine hours	158.1	138.3	124.0	102.0	117.8	153.0	186.0	176.7	132.0	111.6	114.0	136.4	1,649.9
Mean daily sunshine hours	5.1	4.9	4.0	3.4	3.8	5.1	6.0	5.7	4.4	3.6	3.8	4.4	4.5
