= Ali Argon =

American engineer

Ali Suphi Argon (19 December 1930 – 21 December 2019) was a Turkish-American engineer, and the Quentin Berg Professor Emeritus at the Massachusetts Institute of Technology.

== Career ==
Argon, son of M.A. Suphi Argon from a high-ranking Ottoman military and civil service family and Margarethe née Grosche from Berlin, attended school in Turkey. In 1948, he began studying mechanical engineering at Purdue University, gaining a B.S. degree in 1952. This was followed by the S.M. (Scientiae Magister) from the Massachusetts Institute of Technology (MIT) in 1953. At MIT with Egon Orowan, he turned to materials science and engineering and received his D.Sc. doctorate.

For the next two years he worked at the High Voltage Engineering Corporation in Burlington, Massachusetts on Van de Graaff particle accelerators for research and medical applications. In 1959, he returned to Turkey to do his military service, also holding a lectureship at the new Middle East Technical University in Ankara. In 1960, he returned to MIT as an assistant professor, becoming professor there in 1968, Quentin Berg Professor in 1982 and Quentin Berg Professor Emeritus in 2001.

His experimental and theoretical material science research contributed significantly to the elucidation of the physical processes of plastic deformation and fracture of metals, alloys, ceramics, glass, polymers and composite materials. In 1972, he was a visiting professor of polymer physics at the University of Leeds and in 1992 a visiting scientist with the Humboldt Research Award at Peter Haasen's Institute for Metal Physics at the University of Göttingen. He was also a visiting scientist at Stanford University in 1992.

Argon was married to Xenia née Lacher and had two children, the astrophysicist Alice and the environmental biologist Kermit.

== Honours and awards ==
- Charles Russ Richards Memorial Award of the American Society of Mechanical Engineers (1976)
- Inducted a Fellow of the American Physical Society (1987)
- Member of the National Academy of Engineering (1989)
- Nadai Medal of the American Society of Mechanical Engineers (1998)
- Staudinger - Durrer - Prize of ETH Zurich (1999)
- Heyn Memorial medal of the German Society for Material Science (2004)
- Honorary Doctor from Purdue University (2005)

== Publications ==
- Frank A. McClintock, Ali S. Argon Mechanical Behavior of Materials Addison-Wesley 1966 ISBN 0-201-04545-1
- U. F. Kocks, A. S. Argon, M. F. Ashby Thermodynamics And Kinetics of Slip - Progress In Materials Science volume=19 1975 pages 1–281
- Ali S. Argon Strengthening Mechanisms In Crystal Plasticity Oxford University Press 2007 ISBN 978-0-19-965922-7
- A. S. Argon The Physics of Deformation and Fracture of Polymers Cambridge University Press 2013 ISBN 978-0-521-82184-1
