= Aragonés (surname) =

Aragonés (meaning "Aragonese, from Aragón" in the Spanish and Aragonese languages) is a Spanish surname. Notable people with the surname include:

- Carlos Aragonés (born 1956), Bolivian footballer and coach
- Luis Aragonés (1938–2014), Spanish footballer and coach
- Sergio Aragonés (born 1937), Spanish cartoonist and writer

== See also ==
- Aragonese (disambiguation)
