= Argon people =

Community in Ladakh, India

The Argon people are a community in the Indian union territory of Ladakh. Dastan-e-Karwan presented the history of the Arghon or Argon community, an ethnically diverse Sunni Muslim community rooted in Ladakh. Their origins trace back to the 17th century, when traders from Yarkand and Kashgar (now in western China), and Tibet intermarried with the local Ladakhi women.

== Related Reading ==
- Mann, Rann Singh (2002), Ladakh Then and Now: Cultural, Ecological, and Political, Mittal Publications, ISBN 978-8-17099-838-9
