= List of tornadoes in the May 2004 tornado outbreak sequence =

Tornadoes per state/province
State	Total	F0	F1	F2	F3	F4
Alabama	9	3	6	0	0	0
Arkansas	3	1	1	1	0	0
Colorado	1	1	0	0	0	0
Illinois	28	12	14	2	0	0
Indiana	26	13	7	4	2	0
Iowa	52	38	12	1	1	0
Kansas	46	29	12	3	2	0
Kentucky	17	8	5	3	1	0
Maryland	2	1	1	0	0	0
Michigan	9	6	3	0	0	0
Minnesota	3	3	0	0	0	0
Mississippi	2	1	1	0	0	0
Missouri	35	23	7	3	1	1
Nebraska	66	45	18	2	0	1
New York	1	0	1	0	0	0
North Dakota	2	1	1	0	0	0
Ohio	4	2	2	0	0	0
Oklahoma	25	11	11	2	1	0
Ontario	4	1	1	2	0	0
Pennsylvania	2	1	0	1	0	0
South Dakota	19	19	0	0	0	0
Tennessee	6	0	6	0	0	0
Texas	15	13	2	0	0	0
Virginia	5	3	2	0	0	0
West Virginia	1	1	0	0	0	0
Wisconsin	4	4	0	0	0	0
Wyoming	1	1	0	0	0	0
Totals	389					
Each tornado is classed per state based on its starting location.

The tornado outbreak sequence of May 2004 produced several tornado outbreaks between May 21 and May 31, 2004, across mostly the Midwestern and Southern United States as well as southern Ontario, including three major outbreaks on May 22, May 24 and May 29–30. Overall, the sequence produced 389 tornadoes, which makes it one of the most productive tornado outbreak sequences in history.

The Hallam, Nebraska tornado outbreak on May 22 produced nearly 60 tornadoes across mostly Nebraska and Iowa including an F4 that tore through the town Hallam situated halfway between Lincoln and Beatrice. It was recorded as the largest tornado ever with a width of 2.5 miles (4.0 km) and one person was killed. However, in May 2013 it was passed by the El Reno, Oklahoma tornado with a width of 2.6 miles wide. On May 24, another tornado outbreak took place across the central United States, with about 50 tornadoes confirmed in Kansas, Illinois, Nebraska and Missouri. One person was killed in western Illinois near Winchester west of Springfield. A smaller outbreak on May 27 produced a damaging tornado in the city of Lexington in northern Kentucky.

The Memorial Day Weekend outbreak produced one of the largest tornado outbreaks on record from May 29, 2004 to the early morning hours of May 31, 2004. During the Memorial Day Weekend, 168 tornadoes touched down from the Midwestern United States from the Dakotas to Oklahoma eastward towards the Ohio and Tennessee Valleys from Ohio and Indiana southward towards Alabama. This outbreak has been compared with the April 3–4, 1974 Super Outbreak in terms of number of tornadoes, but had much fewer strong to violent tornadoes, with only one violent tornado in Missouri and 16 other strong tornadoes, while there were 30 violent and 66 strong tornadoes during the record-breaking event in 1974. At least five people were killed by this outbreak across two states, including four in Missouri and one in Indiana, but the death toll is much lower than the 315 or more deaths recorded during the 1974 event.

== Confirmed tornadoes ==
Confirmed tornadoes by Fujita rating
FU	F0	F1	F2	F3	F4	F5	Total
0	241	114	24	8	2	0	389

=== May 21 event ===
Confirmed tornadoes by Fujita rating
FU	F0	F1	F2	F3	F4	F5	Total
0	14	7	1	1	0	0	23

F#	Location	County	Time (UTC)	Path length	Damage
Iowa
F0	Holland area	Grundy	1928	3 miles (4.8 km)	Brief touchdown with no damage.
F1	NE of Holland	Grundy	1938	3.5 miles (5.6 km)	Weak tornado with little or no damage.
F0	E of Holland	Grundy	1949	0.5 mile (0.8 km)	Brief touchdown with no damage.
F0	NW of Ivester	Grundy	2015	0.5 mile (0.8 km)	Brief touchdown with no damage.
F0	N of Waterloo	Black Hawk	2021	0.3 mile (0.5 km)	Brief touchdown with no damage.
F0	NW of Holland	Grundy	2022	0.5 mile (0.8 km)	Brief touchdown with no damage.
F0	SE of Newhall	Benton	2105	0.1 mile (0.15.6 km)	Brief touchdown with no damage.
F0	NW of Vinton	Benton	2107	0.1 mile (0.16 km)	Brief touchdown with no damage.
F1	NW of Atkins	Benton	2113	1.7 miles (2.7 km)	Tornado damaged trees and farms, some heavily. Outbuildings were damaged, and one was completely destroyed.
F3	Palo area	Linn	2122	3 miles (4.8 km)	Tornado initially caused damage to a farm two miles southwest of Palo where a garage and three outbuildings were destroyed. As it approached Palo, another farm was severely damaged. The roof and walls were torn off a house, and a car was lofted 50 feet. The tornado continued across the southern edge of Palo, where it destroyed a mobile home before dissipating.
F0	Vinton area	Benton	2144	unknown	Brief touchdown with no damage
F1	E of Martelle	Jones	2206	6 miles (9.6 km)	A cattle shed and a mobile home were destroyed while houses and outbuildings sustained minor damage. Trees were damaged as well.
F1	SE of Royal	Clay	2212	1 mile (1.6 km)	Tornado destroyed a farm house and several other buildings on a farm.
F1	W of Rolfe	Pocahontas	2300	5 miles (8 km)	Weak tornado with little or no damage.
F2	Bradgate area	Pocahontas, Humboldt	2308	12.5 miles (20 km)	Approximately 75% of the buildings in Bradgate were damaged or destroyed by this half-mile-wide tornado. Outbuildings, light structures, and garages were heavily damaged or destroyed. Large trees were snapped, and 15 people were injured.
F0	W of Cornelia	Wright	0030	0.2 mile (0.32 km)	Brief touchdown with no damage.
Ohio
F0	SE of Olivesburg	Richland	2002	unknown	Brief touchdown with no damage.
West Virginia
F0	N of Arden	Berkeley	0114	3 miles (4.8 km)	Damage limited to trees.
Nebraska
F1	N of Hadar	Pierce	0120	1.5 miles (2.4 km)	A garage, a farm, and a few farm outbuildings were damaged. The tornado also downed power lines near Hadar, knocking out the power to part of town.
F0	S of Ainsworth	Brown	0144	0.2 mile (0.32 km)	Brief touchdown with no damage.
F1	SE of Wayne	Wayne	0220	0.5 mile (0.8 km)	One barn and six outbuildings were severely damaged or destroyed. One house sustained lesser damage.
F0	NW of Bartlett	Garfield	0313	0.2 mile (0.32 km)	Brief touchdown with no damage.
South Dakota
F0	W of Gayville	Yankton	0220	0.1 mile (0.16 km)	Brief touchdown with no damage.
Sources: Tornado History Project Storm Data - May 21, 2004, NCDC Database- May 21, 2004

=== May 22 event ===
Confirmed tornadoes by Fujita rating
FU	F0	F1	F2	F3	F4	F5	Total
0	43	19	5	1	1	0	68

F#	Location	County	Time (UTC)	Path length	Damage
Michigan
F0	SW of Burt	Saginaw	1958	2.5 miles (4 km)	Trees and power lines were blown down.
F0	E of Saginaw	Saginaw	2002	0.2 mile (0.32 km)	Trees and wires were blown down.
F0	N of Bennington	Shiawassee	2035	0.1 mile (0.16 km)	One tree was snapped.
F1	NE of Otter Lake	Tuscola	2045	1 mile (1.6 km)	Two houses had roof damage, and numerous trees were knocked down.
F0	SE of Palms	Sanilac	2110	1 mile (1.6 km)	Two barns were blown down.
Wyoming
F0	SW of La Grange	Goshen	2010	0.2 mile (0.32 km)	Brief touchdown with no damage.
Colorado
F0	SE of Padroni	Logan	2120	0.1 mile (0.16 km)	Brief touchdown with no damage.
Nebraska
F0	E of Tryon	McPherson	2222	0.2 mile (0.32 km)	Brief touchdown with no damage.
F0	S of Beaver City	Furnas	2228	0.1 mile (0.16 km)	A dozen power poles were knocked down.
F1	SE of Beaver City	Furnas	2235	3 miles (4.8 km)	Several outbuildings on a farmstead sustained damage. A tractor and six row planter were overturned on top of a car.
F0	NE of Ringgold (1st tornado)	Logan	2240	0.1 mile (0.16 km)	Brief touchdown with no damage.
F0	NE of Ringgold (2nd tornado)	Logan	2240	2 miles (3.2 km)	Weak tornado with no damage.
F0	SE of Stamford	Harlan	2249	0.2 mile (0.32 km)	Brief tornado damaged a mobile home and upset irrigation systems.
F0	N of Orleans	Harlan	2304	0.2 mile (0.32 km)	Brief touchdown with no damage.
F0	SW of Schuyler	Colfax	2310	1.05 miles (1.68 km)	Brief touchdown with no damage.
F0	E of Alma	Harlan	2311	0.2 mile (0.32 km)	Brief touchdown with no damage
F1	SW of Oconto	Custer	2334	0.2 mile (0.32 km)	A center pivot irrigation system was overturned.
F0	NW of Campbell	Franklin	2336	0.1 mile (0.16 km)	A few power poles were snapped.
F0	W of Bladen	Webster	2346	3.5 miles (5.6 km)	Damage to a machine shed and numerous trees.
F1	NE of Oconto	Custer	2350	0.5 mile (0.8 km)	Tornado overturned a center pivot irrigation system and ripped a 90-foot section of roof from a hog confinement building. It also broke large limbs off trees.
F0	NE of Hebron	Thayer	2353	0.2 mile (0.32 km)	Brief touchdown with no damage.
F2	N of Alexandria	Thayer	0000	8 miles (12.8 km)	One house was damaged beyond repair, and six farmsteads were also hit by the tornado. A machine shed and center pivot systems were destroyed, and three semi-trucks were stacked on top of each other.
F1	SW of Pauline	Adams	0010	7 miles (11.2 km)	Damage to center pivot systems.
F0	W of Mason City	Custer	0012	0.2 mile (0.32 km)	Brief touchdown with no damage.
F0	SE of Maxwell	Lincoln	0013	0.1 mile (0.16 km)	Brief touchdown with no damage.
F1	Fremont area	Dodge	0015	2 miles (3.2 km)	Farm buildings and power poles were damaged. An air-conditioning unit on top of a Wal-Mart store was toppled off the roof, landing on an SUV parked below.
F0	W of Ansley	Custer	0017	0.1 mile (0.16 km)	Brief touchdown with no damage.
F2	NE of Blue Hill to NE of Fairfield	Adams, Clay	0019	23 miles (36.8 km)	Fifteen houses sustained damage. Thirty-eight railway wagons/cars were derailed, and 100 center pivot irrigation systems were damaged or destroyed
F0	S of Milligen	Thayer	0024	1 mile (1.6 km)	Brief touchdown with no damage.
F1	NE of Bruning (1st tornado)	Fillmore	0026	2.5 miles (4 km)	One house was dislodged from its foundation. A second tornado (see below) passed just south of the same house six minutes later.
F1	W of Fairfield	Clay	0029	0.2 mile (0.32 km)	Wind equipment recorded a 105 mph (169 km/h) wind gust as the tornado passed over. No reported damage.
F4	W of Daykin to Palmyra	Jefferson, Saline, Gage, Lancaster, Otoe	0030	52 mi (83.69 km)	1 death – See article on this tornado – With a diameter of 2.5 miles (4.0 km), this is tied with the 2016 Jiangsu tornado for second-widest tornado ever recorded after the 2013 El Reno tornado.
F1	NE of Bruning (2nd tornado)	Fillmore	0032	2 miles (3.2 km)	Several outbuildings were damaged.
F0	SE of Benedict	York	0034	0.2 mile (0.32 km)	Power poles and a machine shed were damaged.
F0	E of Daykin	Jefferson	0035	2 miles (3.2 km)	Minor damage to farm outbuildings. Tornado was on the ground at the same time and near the main Hallam tornado.
F1	NE of Byron	Thayer	0153	10 miles (16 km)	Tornado remained in rural areas.
F0	NE of Chester	Thayer	0225	6 miles (9.6 km)	Damage was limited to power poles, center pivot irrigation systems, and trees.
F1	S of Daykin	Jefferson	0230	3 miles (4.8 km)	Minor damage to houses and some irrigation pivots. Grain bins were overturned as well.
F1	S of Murdock	Cass	0240	1.5 miles (2.4 km)	Several outbuildings were destroyed, and many trees and power lines were downed as well.
F1	E of Nehawka	Cass	0257	4 miles (6.4 km)	Greater than 30 homes sustained major damage, and transmission towers were knocked down. Some of the damage could have also been caused by straight line winds that occurred across parts of the area shortly before the reported time of the tornado.
F1	N of Murray	Cass	0312	1 mile (1.6 km)	Some houses and cabins were damaged.
Ontario
F2	Mitchell area	Perth	0000	unknown	Extensive property damage to houses and barns.
F3	Gad's Hill	Perth	0043	unknown	Extensive property damage to barns and houses.
F1	E of Seaforth	Perth	unknown	unknown	Extensive damage to a barn.
Iowa
F1	E of Canby	Adair	0007	7.1 miles (11.4 km)	No reported damage.
F0	S of Dexter	Madison	0011	0.3 mile (0.5 km)	Brief touchdown with no damage.
F0	SW of Maxwell	Story	0045	1.4 miles (2.2 km)	Weak tornado with no damage.
F0	NW of Earlham	Dallas	0045	0.2 mile (0.32 km)	Brief touchdown with no damage.
F1	W of Adel	Dallas	0055	5 miles (8 km)	No reported damage.
F0	NE of Newton	Jasper	0106	0.2 mile (0.32 km)	Brief touchdown with no damage.
F0	NE of Adel	Dallas	0113	0.5 mile (0.8 km)	Brief touchdown with no damage.
F0	N of Beebeetown	Harrison	0119	0.2 mile (0.32 km)	Brief touchdown with no damage.
F0	SW of Ferguson	Marshall	0119	0.5 mile (0.8 km)	Brief touchdown with no damage.
F0	N of Newton	Jasper	0120	0.2 mile (0.32 km)	Brief touchdown with no damage.
F0	W of Newburg	Jasper	0123	0.2 mile (0.32 km)	Brief touchdown with no damage.
F0	SE of Minburn	Dallas	0127	0.2 mile (0.32 km)	Brief touchdown with no damage.
F0	SW of Laurel	Jasper	0135	0.2 mile (0.32 km)	Brief touchdown with no damage.
F0	N of Baxter	Jasper	0136	1.5 miles (2.4 km)	Weak tornado with no damage.
F1	E of Melbourne	Marshall	0140	17 miles (27.2 km)	Minimal damage reported.
F0	NE of Corley	Shelby	0145	2 miles (3.2 km)	Weak tornado with little or no damage
F0	W of Alleman	Polk	0206	2 miles (3.2 km)	Weak tornado with no damage.
F0	S of Garwin	Tama	0215	0.3 mile (0.5 km)	Brief touchdown with no damage
F0	Adair area	Adair	0433	0.2 mile (0.32 km)	Brief touchdown with no damage.
F1	S of Martensdale	Warren	0502	7 miles (11.2 km)	Little or no damage reported.
Kansas
F0	SW of Republic (1st tornado)	Republic	0142	0.1 mile (0.16 km)	One barn was damaged.
F2	SW of Republic (2nd tornado)	Republic	0144	2 miles (3.2 km)	The roof of the Pawnee Indian Museum was damaged, and a one-ton granite memorial was moved eight feet off its foundation there. Center pivoting irrigation systems and a windmill were also damaged, and power lines were downed.
F0	NE of Republic (1st tornado)	Republic	0156	0.1 mile (0.1.6 km)	Brief touchdown with no damage.
F0	NE of Republic (2nd tornado)	Republic	0159	0.1 mile (0.1.6 km)	Brief touchdown with no damage.
Sources: Tornado History Project Storm Data - May 22, 2004, List of Canadian tornadoes and tornado outbreaks (since 2001), 2004 Ontario Tornadoes, NCDC Database- May 22, 2004

=== May 23 event ===
Confirmed tornadoes by Fujita rating
FU	F0	F1	F2	F3	F4	F5	Total
0	7	1	1	0	0	0	9

F#	Location	County	Time (UTC)	Path length	Damage
Wisconsin
F0	SE of Reedsville	Manitowoc	1147	0.1 mile (0.16 km)	One house had siding and shingle damage.
F0	SE of Stoughton	Dane	2355	1 mile (1.6 km)	Brief touchdown with no damage.
F0	SE of DeForest	Dane	2359	1.3 miles (2.1 km)	Weak tornado with no damage.
F0	SW of Fall River	Columbia	0025	0.1 mile (0.16 km)	Brief touchdown with no damage.
Michigan
F0	NE of Brent Creek	Genesee	2200	0.1 mile (0.16 km)	Brief touchdown with no damage.
F0	Mount Morris area	Genesee	2210	0.1 mile (0.16 km)	Brief touchdown with no damage.
F1	E of Yale	St. Clair	0030	1 mile (1.6 km)	One roof was damaged and numerous trees were blown down.
Illinois
F0	NE of Auburn	Sangamon	0027	0.1 mile (0.16 km)	Brief touchdown with no damage.
F2	S of Graymont	McLean, Livingston	0120	13.1 miles (21 km)	Several farm buildings sustained extensive damage, and one farmhouse had its roof torn off.. A mobile home, Grain bins, outbuildings, and a mobile home were destroyed.
Sources: Tornado History Project Storm Data - May 23, 2004, NCDC Database- May 23, 2004

=== May 24 event ===
Confirmed tornadoes by Fujita rating
FU	F0	F1	F2	F3	F4	F5	Total
0	38	14	2	0	0	0	54

F#	Location	County	Time (UTC)	Path length	Damage
Ontario
F0	Waterloo area	Waterloo	1445	unknown	Minor house and tree damage occurred.
Nebraska
F0	SE of Lawrence	Nuckolls	2005	2 miles (3.2 km)	A shed and grain bin were damaged, and power poles were broken
F0	NW of Nelson	Nuckolls	2020	0.1 mile (0.16 km)	Brief touchdown with no damage.
F0	E of Nelson	Nuckolls	2028	0.1 mile (0.16 km)	Brief touchdown with no damage
F0	S of Oak	Nuckolls	2035	0.1 mile (0.16 km)	Brief touchdown with no damage.
F0	N of Nora	Nuckolls	2041	0.1 mile (0.16 km)	Some power poles were snapped.
F0	N of Ruskin	Nuckolls	2052	0.1 mile (0.16 km)	Brief touchdown with no damage.
F1	S of Ruskin	Nuckolls	2058	2 miles (3.2 km)	Five grain bins were destroyed.
F0	SW of Deshler (1st tornado)	Thayer	2102	2 miles (3.2 km)	Several trees and a shed were damaged.
F1	SW of Deshler (2nd tornado)	Thayer	2106	2 miles (3.2 km)	Tornado damaged two farmsteads north of Byron. At the first farm, the roof was torn from the house, the garage was heavily damaged, and the machine shed was ripped apart. At a second farm, damage was confined to metal buildings, grain bins, and farm machinery.
F0	NE of Hardy	Nuckolls	2116	0.1 mile (0.16 km)	Brief touchdown with no damage.
F0	W of Chester	Thayer	2129	0.1 mile (0.16 km)	Brief touchdown with no damage.
Missouri
F1	W of Maitland	Holt	2035	2 miles (3.2 km)	One barn and nearby crops were both damaged.
F0	W of Pumpkin Center	Nodaway	2128	0.5 mile (0.8 km)	Brief touchdown with no damage.
F2	S of Stanberry to SW of New Hampton	Gentry	2155	17 miles (27.2 km)	Three houses were destroyed when a multi-vortex tornado struck Albany. In addition, there were 34 buildings with major damage and 70 other buildings with minor damage.
F0	NW of Bethany	Harrison	2253	0.5 mile (0.8 km)	Brief touchdown with no damage.
F1	SE of Chillicothe	Livingston	2318	9.5 miles (15.2 km)	Unknown isolated F1 damage occurred.
F0	SW of Mount Moriah	Harrison	2324	0.5 mile (0.8 km)	Brief touchdown with no damage.
F1	E of Meadville	Linn	2347	5 miles (8 km)	Weak tornado with little or no damage.
F1	N of Grant City	Worth	0012	2 miles (3.2 km)	Brief touchdown with no damage.
F1	New Cambria area	Macon	0045	1 mile (1.6 km)	Three buildings and a grain elevator were destroyed. The roof of a school and 50 other buildings were damaged.
F0	NW of Hannibal	Marion	0355	2 miles (3.2 km)	Damage limited to trees.
F0	S of Saverton	Ralls	0355	0.2 mile (0.32 km)	Damage limited to trees.
Kansas
F0	NE of Republic (1st tornado)	Republic	2115	0.1 mile (0.16 km)	Brief touchdown with no damage.
F0	NE of Republic (2nd tornado)	Republic	2118	0.1 mile (0.16 km)	Brief touchdown with no damage.
F0	SW of Republic	Republic	2124	0.1 mile (0.16 km)	Brief touchdown with no damage.
F0	NW of Rydal	Republic	2157	0.1 mile (0.16 km)	Brief touchdown with no damage.
F0	SE of Narka	Republic	2208	0.1 mile (0.16 km)	Brief touchdown with no damage.
F0	S of Belleville	Republic	2212	0.1 mile (0.16 km)	Brief touchdown with no damage.
F0	W of Agenda	Republic	2225	0.1 mile (0.16 km)	Brief touchdown with no damage.
F0	NW of Enosdale	Washington	2229	0.1 mile (0.16 km)	Brief touchdown with no damage.
F1	S of Topeka	Shawnee	0025	1.2 miles (1.9 km)	A building and a shed were damaged.
F0	SW of Harveyville	Wabaunsee	0029	0.1 mile (0.16 km)	Brief touchdown with no damage.
F0	W of Harveyville	Wabaunsee	0039	0.1 mile (0.16 km)	Brief touchdown with no damage.
F0	W of Carbondale	Osage	0048	0.1 mile (0.16 km)	Brief touchdown with no damage.
Iowa
F0	N of Thurman	Fremont	2130	3 miles (4.8 km)	Weak tornado with no damage.
F0	S of Earlham	Madison	2158	0.5 mile (0.8 km)	Brief touchdown with no damage.
F0	SW of Bevington	Warren	2240	0.2 mile (0.32 km)	Brief touchdown with no damage.
F1	E of Delphos	Ringgold	0020	0.2 mile (0.32 km)	Brief touchdown with no damage.
F0	Centerville area	Appanoose	0053	0.1 mile (0.16 km)	Brief touchdown with no damage.
New York
F1	NW of Hambletville	Broome, Delaware	2130	6 miles (9.6 km)	A barn and trailer were both destroyed, and the siding on a house was damaged. Many trees were snapped and uprooted along the path.
Oklahoma
F1	NE of Alfalfa	Caddo	2321	0.2 mile (0.32 km)	The Alfalfa Fire Department and a barn both sustained roof damage.
F1	E of Eakly	Caddo	2327	0.2 mile (0.32 km)	A mobile home was heavily damaged.
F0	SW of Manitou (1st tornado)	Tillman	0021	0.5 mile (0.8 km)	Brief touchdown with no damage.
F0	SW of Manitou (2nd tornado)	Tillman	0027	0.7 mile (1.1 km)	Damage limited to trees.
F0	W of Manitou	Tillman	0029	0.3 mile (0.5 km)	Damage limited to trees.
F0	SW of Manitou (3rd tornado)	Tillman	0032	0.2 mile (0.32 km)	Brief touchdown with no damage.
F0	SE of Manitou	Tillman	0058	0.1 mile (0.16 km)	Brief touchdown with no damage.
Illinois
F0	NW of Rockport	Pike	0400	1 mile (1.6 km)	Damage limited to trees.
F1	S of Summer Hill	Pike	0405	5 miles (8 km)	Damage limited to trees.
F0	E of Sunny Hill	Pike	0415	3 miles (4.8 km)	Damage limited to trees.
F1	W of Winchester	Scott	0419	7.3 miles (11.7 km)	1 death – A mobile home and several sheds were destroyed, and multiple houses sustained roof damage. Trees were downed as well. The fatality was from the destroyed mobile home.
F2	Jacksonville area	Morgan	0435	1.2 miles (1.9 km)	A furniture store, house, and church were all destroyed. A motel was heavily damaged, and a number of people were injured there. Several houses and businesses had minor damage.
F1	Divernon	Sangamon	0509	0.3 mile (0.5 km)	Brief touchdown in town. Five garages were destroyed, and several houses were damaged. Numerous trees and power lines were downed.
Sources: Tornado History Project Storm Data - May 24, 2004, 2004 Ontario tornadoes, NCDC Database- May 24, 2004

=== May 25 event ===
Confirmed tornadoes by Fujita rating
FU	F0	F1	F2	F3	F4	F5	Total
0	8	2	1	0	0	0	11

F#	Location	County	Time (UTC)	Path length	Damage
Pennsylvania
F2	W of Cochranton	Crawford	2115	7 miles (11.2 km)	Two large farm buildings and several semi-trailers were destroyed. The roof of a factory was heavily damaged with extensive damage to inventory. Another nearby factory was also damaged. Ten houses were damaged, and hundreds of trees and power poles were downed along the tornado’s track.
F0	NW of Foster Corner	Venango	2210	0.3 mile (0.5 km)	Damage limited to trees.
Maryland
F1	S of Leitersburg	Washington	2137	1.5 miles (2.4 km)	Several houses and a barn had roof and/or structural damage.
F0	W of Pondsville	Frederick	2156	0.5 mile (0.8 km)	Brief touchdown with no damage.
Illinois
F0	NW of Thompsonville	Franklin	2223	0.5 mile (0.8 km)	Brief touchdown with no damage.
Texas
F0	SW of Snyder	Scurry	2245	2 miles (3.2 km)	Brief touchdown with no damage.
F0	NW of Buford	Mitchell	2345	1.2 miles (1.9 km)	Brief touchdown with no damage.
F0	N of Loraine	Mitchell	0012	0.1 mile (0.16 km)	Brief touchdown with no damage.
Virginia
F0	Lovettsville area	Loudoun	2249	0.5 mile (0.8 km)	Brief touchdown with minimal damage.
F1	NW of Irvington	Lancaster	0325	0.1 mile (0.16 km)	A boat house was blown over, and several boats and cars were damaged.
Missouri
F0	NW of Alluance	Bollinger	2255	0.5 mile (0.8 km)	Brief touchdown with no damage.
Sources: Tornado History Project Storm Data - May 25, 2004, NCDC Database- May 25, 2004

=== May 26 event ===
Confirmed tornadoes by Fujita rating
FU	F0	F1	F2	F3	F4	F5	Total
0	7	5	1	0	0	0	13

F#	Location	County	Time (UTC)	Path length	Damage
Virginia
F0	NW of Henegartown	Lee	0735	0.5 mile (0.8 km)	A shed sustained minor damage, and trees were downed.
F1	NW of Kincer Mill	Lee	2104	1.5 miles (2.4 km)	One mobile home was moved from its foundation, and a car was overturned.
F0	NW of Kermit	Scott	2145	0.5 mile (0.8 km)	Damage was limited to trees and roofs.
Tennessee
F1	NW of Mount Carmel	Hawkins	2130	2 miles (3.2 km)	One house lost its roof, and several trees were downed.
Texas
F0	W of Roby (1st tornado)	Fisher	0008	0.1 mile (0.16 km)	Brief touchdown with no damage.
F0	W of Roby	Fisher	0010	0.1 mile (0.16 km)	Brief touchdown with no damage.
Oklahoma
F0	NW of Watchom	Noble, Pawnee	0037	3 miles (4.8 km)	One barn was destroyed, and a garage was “blown in.” Scattered tree limb damage also occurred.
F1	N of New Prue	Osage	0159	1 mile (1.6 km)	Two houses had minor damage, and trees and power poles were downed.
Kansas
F1	NE of Prescott	Linn	0215	5.5 miles (8.8 km)	A mobile home and an old schoolhouse were destroyed. Two people were injured.
F0	N of Girard	Crawford	0615	0.1 mile (0.16 km)	Damage limited to trees.
Missouri
F0	SW of Prairie City	Bates	0250	1 mile (1.6 km)	Brief touchdown with no damage.
F2	Roscoe	St. Clair	0320	12 miles (19.2 km)	Several houses and businesses in Roscoe were heavily damaged or destroyed. One person was injured.
Kentucky
F1	SW of Etna	Pulaski	0600	0.3 mile (0.5 km)	Five mobile homes were destroyed, and several others were damaged. Four people were injured.
Sources: Tornado History Project Storm Data - May 26, 2004, NCDC Database- May 26, 2004

=== May 27 event ===
Confirmed tornadoes by Fujita rating
FU	F0	F1	F2	F3	F4	F5	Total
0	15	5	3	1	0	0	24

F#	Location	County	Time (UTC)	Path length	Damage
Missouri
F0	Melbourne area	Harrison, Daviess	1944	2 miles (3.2 km)	Brief touchdown with no damage.
F0	SW of Edinburg	GRundy	1954	0.5 mile (0.8 km)	Brief touchdown with no damage.
F0	SW of Jonesburg	Montgomery	2340	1 mile (1.6 km)	A dozen buildings sustained roof damage. Numerous trees and power lines were downed.
F0	E of Augusta	St. Charles	0030	0.2 mile (0.32 km)	Damage was limited to trees.
F0	W of Oetters	Franklin	0035	1.5 miles (2.4 km)	Roof damage to some outbuildings.
F0	NW of Hillsboro	Jefferson	0110	0.2 mile (0.32 km)	Three houses had minor roof damage, and a boat deck was damaged. Trees and power lines were downed.
F0	E of French Village	St. Francois	0140	0.2 mile (0.32 km)	Damage to trees and power lines.
Texas
F1	N of Champion	Nolan	2007	2.8 miles (4.5 km)	One barn was destroyed, and power poles were snapped. Irrigation equipment was thrown and twisted.
F0	E of Champion	Nolan	2011	0.1 mile (0.16 km)	One shed was destroyed.
F0	E of Merkel	Taylor	2040	0.1 mile (0.16 km)	Damage limited to power poles.
F1	Del Rio area (1st tornado)	Val Verde	2340	4 miles (6.4 km)	One house lost its roof, while several other roofs and windows were damaged. Vegetation was damaged as well.
F0	Del Rio (2nd tornado)	Val Verde	2347	0.1 mile (0.16 km)	Brief touchdown with no damage.
F0	E of Del Rio	Val Verde	0009	0.1 mile (0.16 km)	Brief touchdown with no damage.
F0	SW of Johnstone	Val Verde	0019	0.8 mile (1.3 km)	Brief touchdown with no damage.
F0	SE of Del Rio	Kinney	0030	1 mile (1.6 km)	Brief touchdown with no damage.
F0	SE of Snyder	Kinney	0031	1.2 miles (1.9 km)	Brief touchdown with no damage.
Ohio
F0	W of Staunton	Fayette	2235	0.1 mile (0.16 km)	Brief touchdown with no damage.
F1	NE of Greenfield	Fayette, Ross	2245	3 miles (4.8 km)	Four barns and a windmill were heavily damaged. A person who was inside one of the barns was injured.
F1	NW of Greenbush	Brown	0020	2 miles (3.2 km)	Several mobile homes and a house were heavily damaged. Numerous trees were downed as well.
Indiana
F2	S of Becks Mill to SE of Charlestown	Washington, Clark	2330	25.9 miles (41.4 km)	Several houses, farm buildings and a garage were heavily damaged or destroyed. Nine houses were destroyed and 31 others damaged in Washington County, while ten houses were either damaged or destroyed in Borden in Clark County. An elementary school was also damaged; although there was a graduation event in progress when the tornado hit, no injuries were reported.
F1	Georgetown area	Floyd	0055	2.9 miles (4.6 km)	Businesses, other commercial buildings, and 25 houses were damaged.
Kentucky
F2	SW of Bethlehem	Henry	0050	7.8 miles (12.5 km)	Twenty-five houses were destroyed, and 326 others were damaged. Two people sustained injuries.
F3	Lexington area	Fayette	0215	3 miles (4.8 km)	This strong tornado moved through multiple subdivisions in Lexington, injuring six people and causing moderate or severe damage to at least 50 houses.
F1	NW of Bluff City	Henderson	0332	0.2 mile (0.32 km)	A shed was destroyed, killing 26 small chickens. A mobile home was tossed from its foundation, and trees were snapped as well. Downgraded from F2 to F1 post-survey.
Sources: Tornado History Project Storm Data - May 27, 2004, NCDC Database- May 27, 2004

=== May 28 event ===
Confirmed tornadoes by Fujita rating
FU	F0	F1	F2	F3	F4	F5	Total
0	15	0	0	0	0	0	15

F#	Location	County	Time (UTC)	Path length	Damage
South Dakota
F0	E of Pearsons Corner	Turner	0004	0.1 mile (0.16 km)	Brief touchdown with no damage.
F0	SW of Lennox (1st tornado)	Lincoln	0020	0.4 mile (0.6 km)	A small shed was destroyed.
F0	SW of Lennox (2nd tornado)	Turner	0034	0.2 mile (0.32 km)	Brief touchdown with no damage.
F0	SE of Worthing	Lincoln	0037	0.2 mile (0.32 km)	Brief touchdown with no damage.
F0	NW of Centerville (1st tornado)	Turner	0053	0.2 mile (0.32 km)	Brief touchdown with no damage.
F0	NW of Centerville (2nd tornado)	Turner	0055	1 mile (1.6 km)	Damage limited to trees.
F0	NW of Beresford	Lincoln	0114	0.2 mile (0.32 km)	Brief touchdown with no damage.
F0	NE of Centerville	Lincoln	0128	0.2 mile (0.32 km)	Brief touchdown with no damage.
F0	SE of Davis (1st tornado)	Lincoln	0141	0.2 mile (0.32 km)	Brief touchdown with no damage.
F0	SE of Davis (2nd tornado)	Lincoln	0144	0.1 mile (0.16 km)	Brief touchdown with no damage.
F0	SE of Davis (3rd tornado)	Lincoln	0146	0.2 mile (0.32 km)	Brief touchdown with no damage.
F0	N of Beresford	Union	0153	0.1 mile (0.16 km)	Brief touchdown with no damage.
F0	NE of Big Springs	Union	0220	0.1 mile (0.16 km)	Brief touchdown with no damage.
Iowa
F0	SE of Owego	Woodbury	0227	0.2 mile (0.32 km)	Brief touchdown with no damage.
F0	W of Oto	Woodbury	0238	0.2 mile (0.32 km)	Brief touchdown with no damage.
Sources: Tornado History Project Storm Data - May 28, 2004, NCDC Database- May 28, 2004

=== May 29 event ===
Confirmed tornadoes by Fujita rating
FU	F0	F1	F2	F3	F4	F5	Total
0	48	22	5	4	1	0	80

F#	Location	County	Time (UTC)	Path length	Damage
Nebraska
F0	S of Maxwell	Lincoln	2121	1 mile (1.6 km)	Brief touchdown with no damage.
F1	NW of Gothenburg	Lincoln	2130	1 mile (1.6 km)	Two grain bins and two center pivot irrigation systems were destroyed. Farm machinery was overturned as well.
F0	W of Callaway	Custer	2155	0.2 mile (0.32 km)	Brief touchdown with no damage.
F0	W of Broken Bow (1st tornado)	Custer	2155	0.1 mile (0.16 km)	Brief touchdown with no damage.
F0	E of Maxwell	Lincoln	2155	0.2 mile (0.32 km)	Brief touchdown with no damage.
F0	SE of Maxwell	Lincoln	2204	0.1 mile (0.16 km)	Brief touchdown with no damage.
F0	W of Oconto	Custer	2206	0.2 mile (0.32 km)	Brief touchdown with no damage.
F0	SW of Sumner	Dawson	2210	0.1 mile (0.16 km)	Brief touchdown with no damage.
F0	W of Broken Bow (2nd tornado)	Custer	2225	0.1 mile (0.16 km)	Brief touchdown with no damage.
F0	SW of O'Neill	Holt	2230	0.1 mile (0.16 km)	Damage limited to broken tree limbs.
F0	NW of Gileadl	Thayer	2230	0.1 mile (0.16 km)	Brief touchdown with no damage.
F0	S of O'Neill	Holt	2233	0.1 mile (0.16 km)	Brief touchdown with no damage.
F0	NW of O'Neill	Holt	2233	0.2 mile (0.32 km)	One poorly constructed barn was destroyed
F0	N of Taylor	Loup	2253	0.1 mile (0.16 km)	Brief touchdown with no damage.
F0	NE of Wymore	Gage	0030	0.1 mile (0.16 km)	Brief touchdown with no damage.
F0	SE of Liberty	Pawnee	0113	0.2 mile (0.32 km)	Brief touchdown with no damage.
F0	SW of Maxwell	Lincoln	0115	0.1 mile (0.16 km)	Brief touchdown with no damage.
Kansas
F0	SW of Beloit	Mitchell	2143	0.1 mile (0.16 km)	Brief touchdown with no damage.
F1	SW of Jamestown	Cloud	2257	4 miles (6.4 km)	One house and two sheds were destroyed, and three other houses were damaged. Irrigation units were also toppled.
F2	NW of Jamestown	Cloud	2311	5 miles (8 km)	Significant damage to farms and power poles. Large trees were downed as well.
F1	SE of Kackley	Republic	2320	1 mile (1.6 km)	Damage limited to trees.
F1	S of Kackley	Cloud	2325	2 miles (3.2 km)	Weak tornado with unknown damage.
F1	SW of Norway	Republic	2328	3.5 miles (5.6 km)	Several farms and outbuildings were damaged or destroyed, and extensive crop damage was observed.
F0	SE of Scandia	Republic	2345	0.5 mile (0.8 km)	Brief touchdown with no damage.
F0	SE of Attica	Harper	0017	0.5 mile (0.8 km)	Brief touchdown with no damage.
F0	SW of Scandia	Republic	0020	1 mile (1.6 km)	Weak tornado with no damage.
F0	SE of Republic	Republic	0020	1 mile (1.6 km)	Weak tornado with no damage.
F1	E of Attica	Harper	0025	6 miles (9.6 km)	One roof was damaged, and there was considerable tree damage.
F0	Oketo area	Mitchell	0028	1 mile (1.66 km)	One mobile home and several other structures were damaged.
F0	SW of Munden	Republic	0036	1 mile (1.6 km)	Weak tornado with no damage.
F2	NE of Anthony	Harper	0043	8 miles (12.2 km)	One house lost its roof as well as most of its contents.
F0	SE of Munden	Republic	0050	1 mile (1.6 km)	Brief touchdown with no damage.
F1	Belleville area	Republic	0056	0.5 mile (0.8 km)	A Dairy Queen restaurant lost its roof.
F0	NW of Harper	Harper	0100	0.5 mile (0.8 km)	Brief touchdown with no damage.
F0	Munden	Republic	0109	0.2 mile (0.32 km)	A few houses were damaged.
F1	SW of Summerfield	Marshall	0110	1 mile (1.6 km)	Weak tornado with no damage.
F1	NW of Freeport	Harper	0119	2.5 miles (4 km)	Several farm dwellings, outbuildings, and farm machinery/equipment were damaged or destroyed. Wheat fields were damaged, and one house lost its roof.
F0	SE of Narka	Republic	0125	1 mile (1.6 km)	Weak tornado without damage.
F1	N of Argonia	Sumner	0128	6 miles (8.4 km)	Damage to one house, several outbuildings, and wheat fields.
F0	N of Milan	Sumner	0132	1 mile (1.6 km)	Weak tornado with minor damage to one home.
F0	SW of Mahaska	Republic	0132	0.5 mile (0.8 km)	Brief touchdown with no damage.
F0	S of Mahaska	Washington	0135	1 mile (1.6 km)	Weak tornado without damage.
F3	E of Conway Springs	Sumner	0142	2.5 miles (4 km)	This was a strong, large, multi-vortex tornado. One mobile home was destroyed (only the frame was left), and its occupant sustained injuries. Several farms - including farm equipment, machinery, and service buildings - were destroyed. Several houses were severely damaged, and one modular home was moved from its foundation.
F3	W of Anson	Sumner	0152	2.5 miles (4 km)	One brick house had only interior walls left, and a modular home was completely removed from its foundation. A “semi-truck” was thrown 100 feet as well.
F1	S of Millerton	Sumner	0155	3.5 miles (5.6 km)	A few roofs and a mobile home were damaged.
North Dakota
F0	SW of Ashley	McIntosh	2208	unknown	Brief touchdown with no damage.
F1	SW of Ashley (2nd tornado)	McIntosh	2214	3 miles (4.8 km)	Weak tornado with no damage reported.
South Dakota
F0	S of Bath	Brown	2308	0.1 mile (0.16 km)	Brief touchdown with no damage.
F0	E of Ordway	Brown	2322	0.3 mile (0.5 km)	Brief touchdown with no damage.
F0	S of Ipswich	Edmunds	2323	1.5 miles (2.4 km)	Weak tornado with no damage.
F0	SE of Ipswich	Edmunds	2335	1.5 miles (2.4 km)	Weak tornado with no damage.
F0	S of Beresford	Clay	0206	0.1 mile (0.16 km)	Brief touchdown with no damage.
Oklahoma
F0	NE of Custer City	Custer	2329	6 miles (9.6 km)	Damage to several power poles occurred.
F2	E of Eagle City	Blaine, Canadian, Kingfisher	0017	19.7 miles (31.5 km)	A wind gust of 181 mph (291 km/h) was documented by Doppler on Wheels. Several barns and outbuildings were destroyed, and there was damage to several homes, one church, and a stock trailer.
F1	NE of Calumet (1st tornado)	Canadian	0104	4.5 miles (7.2 km)	Anticyclonic tornado was documented by the Doppler on Wheels. Two houses and a manufactured home sustained minor damage.
F1	NE of Calumet (2nd tornado)	Canadian	0114	2 miles (3.2 km)	Second anticyclonic tornado with additional minor damage.
F0	NW of Concho	Canadian	0122	0.1 mile (0.16 km)	Brief touchdown with no damage.
F1	SW of Piedmont	Canadian	0145	1 mile (1.6 km)	Damage to several barns and power poles. Was shown live by KOCO-TV.
F2	Edmond area	Oklahoma	0204	4.6 miles (7.4 km)	Seven houses were destroyed, seven others showed significant damage, and 135 others only had minor damage. A church and a public school were also damaged.
F1	W of Fallis	Logan	0301	0.3 mile (0.5 km)	Damage limited to trees.
F0	NW of Fallis	Logan	0317	4 miles (6.4 km)	Weak tornado with no damage.
F1	SW of Carney	Lincoln	0327	2.5 miles (4 km)	Minor tornado damage to several houses. A livestock trailer was rolled 150 yards away, and a riding lawn mower was carried 50 yards. Fences were damaged, and large trees were snapped. Several outbuildings and trailers were damaged or destroyed as well.
F3	N of Depew	Creek	0418	7.5 miles (12 km)	A concrete-anchored iron-pipe cattle gate was removed from the ground.
F1	NW of Bristow	Creek	0433	4.6 miles (7.4 km)	Some structural damage occurred.
F1	N of Kellyville	Creek	0512	5.4 miles (8.6 km)	Damage to trees and power poles.
F0	SW of Sapulpa	Creek	0533	0.1 mile (0.16 km)	One barn was destroyed.
F0	NW of Wagoner	Wagoner	0642	3.5 miles (5.6 km)	Shingle damage to a few houses with additional damage to both outbuildings and trees.
F1	SE of Murphy	Mayes	0651	7.2 miles (11.5 km)	Damage to inhabited houses/buildings, outbuildings, and trees.
Missouri
F3	W of Dearborn	Buchanan, Platte	2322	7 miles (11.2 km)	This large, strong tornado destroyed a barn, and threw a heavy axle from a truck 300 yards.
F0	S of Gower	Clinton	0035	1 mile (1.6 km)	Brief touchdown with no damage.
F0	SW of Agency	Buchanan	0105	0.2 mile (0.32 km)	Brief touchdown with no damage.
F1	Plattsburg area	Clinton, DeKalb	0140	20 miles (32 km)	No reported damage.
F2	E of Osborn	DeKalb	0240	5 miles (8 km)	Tornado stayed in open country with little damage.
F0	NE of Amity	DeKalb	0315	1 mile (1.6 km)	Brief touchdown with no damage.
F4	S of Weatherby to S of Bethany	DeKalb, Daviess, Harrison	0330	22 miles (35.2 km)	3 deaths – This violent tornado destroyed a house and two mobile homes in Weatherby, then remained over open country for the remainder of its path.
F0	SW of Pattonsburg	DeKalb	0340	1 mile (1.6 km)	Brief satellite tornado touchdown to the parent Weatherby tornado with no additional damage.
F0	W of Melbourne	Daviess, Harrison	0418	6 miles (9.6 km)	Weak tornado with no damage.
F0	W of Spickard	Grundy, Mercer	0446	4 miles (6.4 km)	Weak tornado with no damage.
Mississippi
F0	N of Highlandale	Leflore	0039	2 miles (3.2 km)	Weak tornado with no damage.
Kentucky
F1	N of Beelerton	Hickman	0130	5.4 miles (8.6 km)	Damage limited to trees.
Sources: Tornado History Project Storm Data - May 29, 2004, NCDC Database- May 29, 2004

=== May 30 event ===
Confirmed tornadoes by Fujita rating
FU	F0	F1	F2	F3	F4	F5	Total
0	42	37	5	2	0	0	86

F#	Location	County	Time (UTC)	Path length	Damage
Tennessee
F1	N of Tracy	Grundy	1145	1 mile (1.6 km)	Five houses sustained minor shingle damage, and a metal shed was blown away. The porch was torn off of a trailer, and a tree fell onto another trailer.
F1	E of Aspen Hill	Giles	0545	0.3 mile (0.5 km)	Minor roof damage to a few houses. Barns, outbuildings, sheds, and a silo were damaged as well.
F1	NE of Lynchburg	Moore, Franklin	0617	6 miles (9.6 km)	Damage limited to trees.
F1	SE of Pleasant Grove	Bedford	0619	0.8 mile (1.3 km)	One mobile home was destroyed.
Illinois
F0	SE of Green Valley	Tazewell	1437	0.1 mile (0.16 km)	Brief touchdown with no damage.
F1	E of Fruit	Madison	2105	2 miles (3.2 km)	Minor damage to a few houses, and extensive damage to several farm buildings. Sheet metal was carried a quarter-mile away.
F1	SW of Marydale	Clinton	2150	7 miles (11.2 km)	Several farm buildings, one shed, one house, and a silo were all damaged.
F1	E of Eureka	Woodford	2205	9 miles (14.4 km)	Four farm buildings, a grain bin, and a corn crib were destroyed; also, a gas tank and hay bales were thrown an unknown distance.
F0	NW of Patoka	Fayette	2210	0.1 mile (0.16 km)	Brief touchdown with no damage.
F0	S of Lincoln	Logan	2257	0.1 mile (0.16 km)	Three mobile homes were destroyed, and 28 homes were damaged. Three people were injured.
F1	W of Lodemia	Livingston	2311	12 miles (19.2 km)	Several farm buildings, sheds, and outbuildings were damaged. One house lost its roof.
F0	N of Odell	Livingston	2312	0.2 mile (0.32 km)	Brief touchdown with no damage.
F1	N of Du Bois	Washington	2324	4.5 miles (7.2 km)	Damage to trees and outbuildings.
F1	SW of Du Bois	Perry	2325	12 miles (19.2 km)	Five farms, an airport hangar, a machine storage building, and sheds were destroyed. Five houses sustained minor to moderate damage.
F1	SE of Ashley (1st tornado)	Washington	2325	4 miles (6.4 km)	Three large grain bins were destroyed.
F1	Radom area	Washington	2326	4 miles (6.4 km)	Ten houses, several outbuildings, a house trailer, and a school all sustained damage.
F1	NE of Radom	Washington	2327	4.5 miles (5.6 km)	Several outbuildings were damaged.
F1	E of Ashley to NE of Texico	Washington, Jefferson	2328	18.5 miles (29.6 km)	Some sheds and barns were destroyed; a machine shed and a dozen homes were damaged; and a “semi-truck” was blown off of Interstate 64.
F0	S of Eylar	Livingston	2332	0.2 mile (0.32 km)	Brief touchdown with damage limited to downed trees.
F0	N of Etherton	Jackson	2332	0.5 mile (0.8 km)	Brief touchdown with no damage.
F0	E of Saunemin	Livingston	2340	1 mile (1.6 km)	Damage was limited to trees and farm buildings.
F0	Flora area	Clay	0013	0.2 mile (0.32 km)	Minor damage to a few buildings, trees, and power lines.
F0	S of Clay City	Clay	0019	0.2 mile (0.32 km)	Minor damage to a few buildings, trees, and power lines.
Kentucky
F0	S of West Paducah	McCracken	1715	1.5 miles (2.4 km)	A mobile home was blown off its foundation, and a shed was destroyed.
F0	S of Cedar Grove	Todd	1922	0.5 mile (0.8 km)	Damage limited to trees.
F2	S of Barnsley	Hopkins, Muhlenberg	1940	7 miles (11.2 km)	This strong tornado was “caught” on video at Hopkins County Central High School as it damaged their baseball field. A truck stop, several houses, and a number of businesses were damaged, while several barns and outbuildings were destroyed. Several downed trees were discovered in a densely forested area in Muhlenberg County.
F0	S of Masonville	Daviess	2012	0.1 mile (0.16 km)	Brief touchdown with no damage.
F0	SE of Ashville	Jefferson	2127	0.3 mile (0.5 km)	Damaged limited to trees and a few roofs.
F0	NE of Clay City	Powell	2305	0.1 mile (0.16 km)	Brief touchdown with no damage.
F1	S of Providence	Webster	0130	2 miles (3.2 km)	Several houses were significantly damaged, and a dozen utility poles were damaged.
F0	N of Island City	Owsley	0600	0.1 mile (0.16 km)	Damage limited to trees.
F0	S of Ellas	Jackson	0600	0.1 mile (0.16 km)	Damage limited to trees.
F0	N of Dalesburg	Breathitt	0604	0.1 mile (0.16 km)	Brief touchdown with no damage.
F1	S of Hammond	Knox	0605	0.1 mile (0.16 km)	Damage to two trailers, two houses, and a garage.
F1	NW of Erose	Knox	0615	0.2 mile (0.32 km)	Three houses were damaged.
Indiana
F1	E of Arney	Owen	1805	8.4 miles (13.4 km)	This tornado caused significant damage to a few houses.
F0	N of Veedersburg	Fountain	1833	0.1 mile (0.16 km)	Brief touchdown with no damage.
F1	Ellettsville area	Monroe	1909	7 miles (11.2 km)	A cabin was significantly damaged.
F3	S of Taswell to NE of Hogtown	Crawford	1925	15 miles (24 km)	1 death – Multi-vortex tornado. As many as 60 houses in Marengo were destroyed, and 100 others were damaged. About 80% of the town was damaged or destroyed. At least 11 people were injured.
F1	Clarksville area	Clark	1930	2 miles (3.2 km)	Commercial buildings, some businesses, several houses, and a community center were all damaged.
F0	SE of Georgetown	Floyd	1940	3.8 miles (6.1 km)	Damage limited to trees.
F1	Salem area	Washington	2010	10.6 miles (17 km)	Two barns and several outbuildings were destroyed.
F0	S of Bee Ridge	Clay	2155	0.1 mile (0.16 km)	Brief touchdown with no damage.
F0	N of Little Point	Morgan	2300	0.1 mile (0.16 km)	A barn sustained minor damage.
F1	NE of Little Point	Morgan, Hendricks	2310	5 miles (8 km)	Some homes were damaged.
F0	NE of Joppa	Hendricks	2330	0.8 mile (1.3 km)	Brief touchdown with no damage.
F0	NE of Mooresville	Hendricks, Marion	2332	4.1 miles (6.6 km)	Weak tornado with no damage.
F2	Indianapolis to N of Cumberland	Marion, Hancock	0000	20 miles (32 km)	This strong tornado damaged several houses and an elementary school. A nursing home also sustained damages, and. 26 of its residents were injured. In the Indianapolis Metro Area, greater than 600 homes, 24 apartment buildings, and 90 commercial buildings were damaged.
F0	E of Romney	Tippecanoe	0026	0.1 mile (0.16 km)	Brief touchdown with no damage.
F2	Dayton area	Tippecanoe	0029	1.8 miles (2.9 km)	Two buildings lost parts of their roofs, and two houses were nearly destroyed.
F0	E of Kentland	Newton	0032	2.5 miles (4 km)	An antenna was blown down, and two buildings were damaged. A hopper railroad car was pushed 50 yards down a track.
F0	Brook area	Newton	0038	4.5 miles (7.2 km)	Several roofs were damaged, and a machine shed was destroyed
F0	N of Atlanta	Hamilton	0140	0.2 mile (0.32 km)	Damage was limited to a barn and some farm equipment.
F1	N of Darmstadt	Vanderburgh	0140	6 miles (9.6 km)	One house and one business were destroyed. Forty-six houses, six businesses, and an agricultural structure were damaged.
F2	Newburgh area	Warrick	0140	3 miles (4.8 km)	Several businesses lost their roofs, and some carports were destroyed. Several trees landed on houses and vehicles, including the city of Newburgh's maintenance trucks. Four maintenance trucks w incomplete entry?
F3	Peru area	Miami	0155	4.5 miles (7.2 km)	Major damage occurred throughout the town with many structures heavily damaged. Two houses were destroyed, including one where the lone injury was reported. A communication tower was knocked down and several other buildings sustained damage. Miami County was declared a disaster area and damage amounts were estimated at between 6 and 7 million dollars.
F0	Frankton area	Madison	0155	2 miles (3.2 km)	One building sustained minor damage.
F0	NE of Smithville	Monroe	0215	7 miles (11.2 km)	Several sailboats sank at Lake Monroe.
F0	NW of Crothersville	Jackson	0305	1 mile (1.6 km)	A business sustained roof damage and a HAM radio antenna was blown down.
Iowa
F0	NE of Vincennes (1st tornado)	Lee	1918	0.3 mile (0.5 km)	Damage limited to trees.
F1	NE of Vincennes (2nd tornado)	Lee	1923	0.3 mile (0.5 km)	An outbuilding and a machine shed were destroyed.
F0	W of Montrose	Lee	1926	0.3 mile (0.5 km)	Several trees were downed, a satellite dish was damaged, and a picnic table and gas grill were thrown.
F1	SW of Montrose	Lee	1930	0.5 mile (0.8 km)	A garage was destroyed, and a barn sustained roof damage.
F0	N of Urbana	Benton	2028	0.2 mile (0.32 km)	Brief touchdown with no damage.
F1	NE of Williamsburg	Iowa	2036	0.2 mile (0.32 km)	Two grain bins were damaged.
F0	E of Brandon	Buchanan	2050	0.2 mile (0.32 km)	Brief touchdown with no damage.
F0	NE of Quasqueton	Buchanan	2051	0.3 mile (0.5 km)	An outbuilding was destroyed.
F0	SW of Monticello	Jones	2056	0.3 mile (0.5 km)	Brief touchdown with no damage.
Missouri
F0	SW of Delaware	Shannon	2023	0.1 mile (0.16 km)	Damage limited to trees.
F1	SE of Lebanon	Laclede	2053	1 mile (1.6 km)	One barn was severely damaged.
F1	NW of Berkeley	St. Louis	2220	2 miles (3.2 km)	1 death – One business and several apartment buildings sustained roof damage. Several trees and power poles were downed including one branch that fell and killed the driver of an SUV.
F0	SE of Reynolds	Reynolds	2245	0.1 mile (0.16 km)	An electric substation sustained damage.
Minnesota
F0	N of Clear Lake	Sherburne	2035	0.5 mile (0.8 km)	Brief touchdown with no damage.
F0	N of Mazeppa	Goodhue	0028	0.5 mile (0.8 km)	Brief touchdown with no damage.
F0	W of Rush City	Chisago	0028	0.3 mile (0.5 km)	Damage limited to trees and a fence.
Arkansas
F1	NE of Laneburg	Nevada	0000	10 miles (16 km)	One barn was destroyed, and another sustained significant roof damage.
F0	W of Bearden	Ouachita	0047	1.8 miles (2.9 km)	A garage and a mobile home were damaged.
F2	SW of Hydrick	Cross	0105	0.5 mile (0.8 km)	Two farm buildings and five large grain bins were destroyed, while two homes were damaged.
Mississippi
F1	W of Walnut	Tippah	0405	0.2 mile (0.32 km)	One house was severely damaged and the steeple of a church was blown off.
Alabama
F1	NW of Threet	Lauderdale	0440	3.2 miles (5.1 km)	Damage to trees and power lines.
F1	SW of Florencet	Lauderdale	0452	6 miles (9.6 km)	Numerous trees were snapped and some fell on structures.
F1	SE of Killen	Lauderdale	0509	4 miles (6.4 km)	Several trees were snapped and some fell on structures.
F1	NE of Grassy	Lauderdale	0520	2.5 miles (4 km)	Some houses lost their roofs.
F1	SW of Elkmont	Limestone	0526	9 miles (14.4 km)	Several mobile homes were damaged or destroyed, and 3 people were injured.
F1	NW of Hazel Green, Alabama to E of Huntland, TE	Madison, Alabama, Lincoln, TE, Franklin	0555	23.5 miles (37.6 km)	Damage limited to trees and power poles in Tennessee, but several buildings sustained roof damage in Madison County in Alabama.
Ohio
F1	S of Peebles	Adams	0530	0.1 mile (0.16 km)	One fence was destroyed and several trees were uprooted.
Sources: Tornado History Project Storm Data - May 30, 2004, NCDC Database- May 30, 2004

=== May 31 event ===
Confirmed tornadoes by Fujita rating
FU	F0	F1	F2	F3	F4	F5	Total
0	4	2	0	0	0	0	6

F#	Location	County	Time (UTC)	Path length	Damage
Tennessee
F1	W of Felker	Bradley	0730	7.5 miles (12 km)	Damage to several structures and trees.
Alabama
F0	Hueytown area	Jefferson	0922	1.7 miles (2.7 km)	Twenty-six houses had minor or moderate damage.
F0	W of Hoover	Jefferson	0929	4.2 miles (6.7 km)	Seventy-three houses sustained minor or moderate damage, and the roofs of some businesses were also damaged.
F0	NW of Coffee Springs	Geneva	1933	0.2 mile (0.32 km)	Damage to trees and power lines.
Michigan
F1	NW of Port Huron	St. Clair	2120	1.5 miles (2.4 km)	Six to ten homes, 24 cars, and a strip mall sustained damage. A construction trailer was also blown over.
Texas
F0	S of Belott	Houston	2205	0.2 mile (0.32 km)	Brief touchdown with no damage.
Sources: Tornado History Project Storm Data - May 31, 2004

== See also ==
- Weather of 2004
- List of North American tornadoes and tornado outbreaks
- List of F4 and EF4 tornadoes
  - List of F4 and EF4 tornadoes (2000–2009)
- Tornadoes of 2004
