= Milton, Kansas =

Unincorporated community in Sumner County, Kansas

- CDP
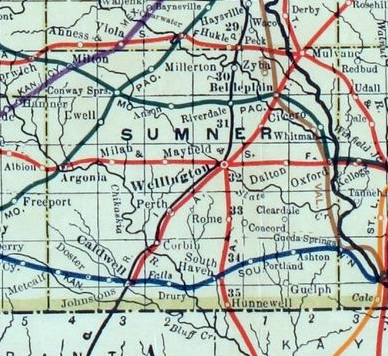
- 1915 railroad map of Sumner County

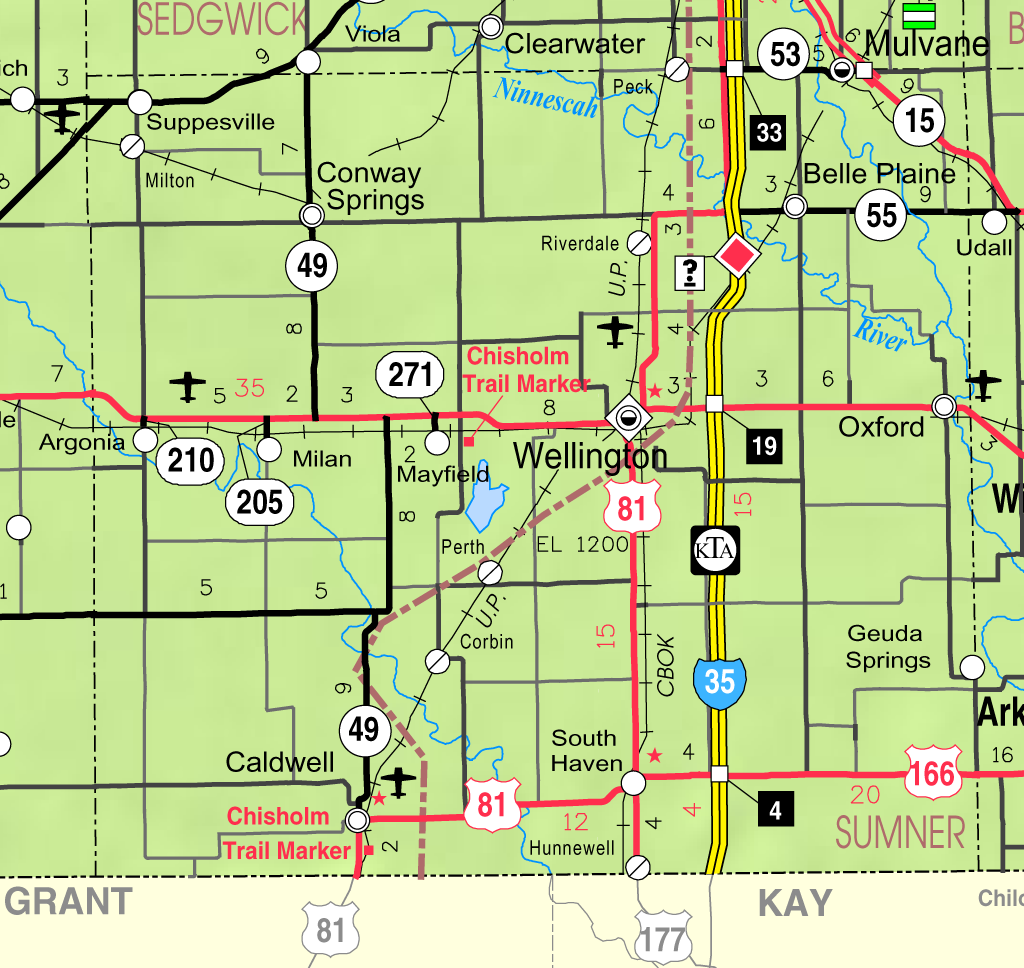
- KDOT map of Sumner County (legend)

- Location within Kansas Location within the United States
- Coordinates: 37°25′54″N 97°46′17″W
- Country: United States
- State: Kansas
- County: Sumner
- Elevation: 1,473 ft (449 m)

Population (2020)
  - Total: 155
- Time zone: UTC-6 (CST)
  - Summer (DST): UTC-5 (CDT)
- ZIP Code: 67106
- Area code: 620
- FIPS code: 20-46925
- GNIS ID: 470277

Milton is a census-designated place (CDP) in Sumner County, Kansas, United States. As of the 2020 census, the population was 155. It is located 4.5 miles (7.2 km) southeast of Norwich at the intersection of N Argonia Rd and W 120th Ave N, next to the railroad.

== History ==
The first post office in Milton was established in the 1870s. Milton has a post office with ZIP Code 67106.

A railroad currently passed through the community from Conway Springs to Norwich. Another railroad previously passed through the community from Viola to Harper.

== Demographics ==
Historical population
Census	Pop.	Note	%±
2020	155		—
U.S. Decennial Census

The 2020 United States census counted 155 people, 62 households, and 44 families in Milton. The population density was 34.9 per square mile (13.5/km^{2}). There were 74 housing units at an average density of 16.7 per square mile (6.4/km^{2}). The racial makeup was 90.97% (141) white or European American (90.97% non-Hispanic white), 0.0% (0) black or African-American, 1.29% (2) Native American or Alaska Native, 0.0% (0) Asian, 0.0% (0) Pacific Islander or Native Hawaiian, 0.65% (1) from other races, and 7.1% (11) from two or more races. Hispanic or Latino of any race was 4.52% (7) of the population.

Of the 62 households, 19.4% had children under the age of 18; 66.1% were married couples living together; 25.8% had a female householder with no spouse or partner present. 25.8% of households consisted of individuals and 9.7% had someone living alone who was 65 years of age or older. The average household size was 2.5 and the average family size was 2.6. The percent of those with a bachelor's degree or higher was estimated to be 0.0% of the population.

23.9% of the population was under the age of 18, 7.1% from 18 to 24, 22.6% from 25 to 44, 28.4% from 45 to 64, and 18.1% who were 65 years of age or older. The median age was 42.5 years. For every 100 females, there were 103.9 males. For every 100 females ages 18 and older, there were 107.0 males.

The 2016–2020 5-year American Community Survey estimates show that the median household income was $27,101 (with a margin of error of +/- $11,208) and the median family income was $26,979 (+/- $16,163). Females had a median income of $13,733 (+/- $709). The median income for those above 16 years old was $13,368 (+/- $2,465). Approximately, 63.2% of families and 69.2% of the population were below the poverty line, including 100.0% of those under the age of 18 and 0.0% of those ages 65 or over.

== Education ==
The majority of the CDP is located in the Kingman–Norwich USD 331 public school district. A piece of the CDP is within the Conway Springs USD 356.
