= Anson, Kansas =

Unincorporated community in Sumner County, Kansas

- Unincorporated community
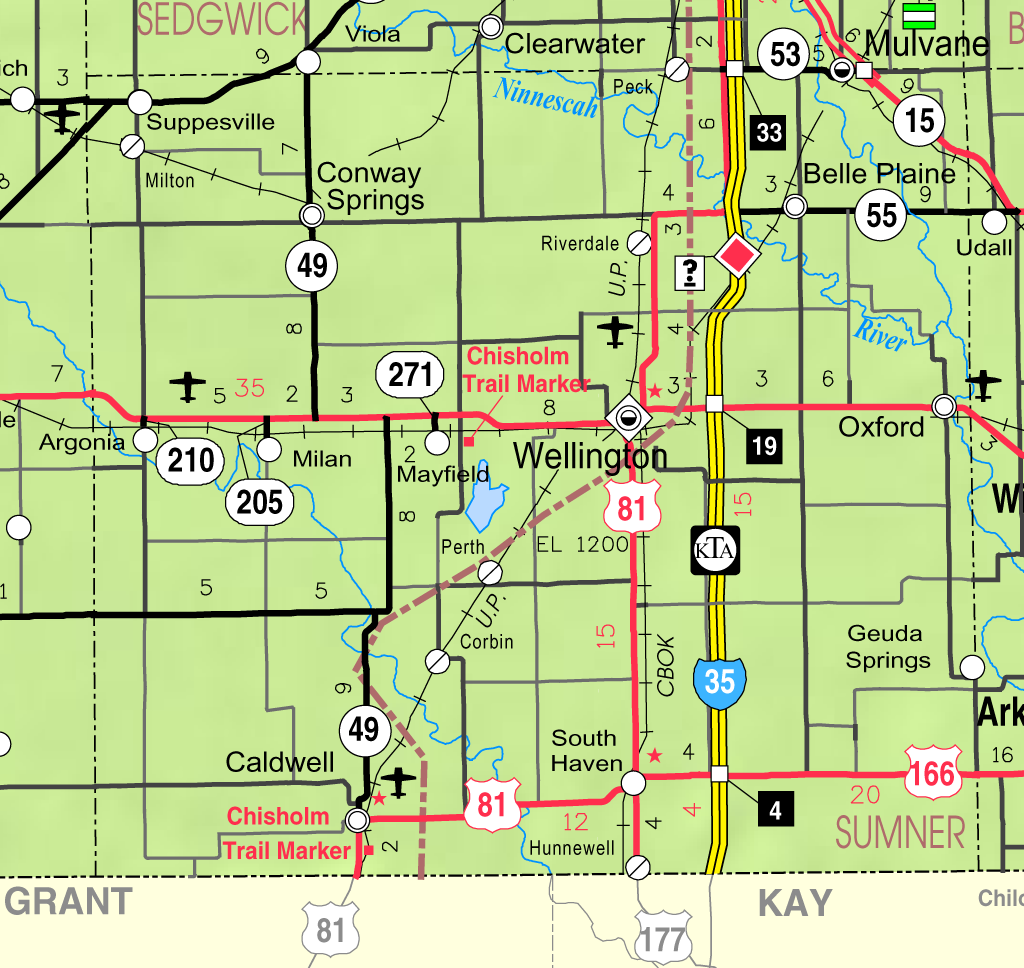
- KDOT map of Sumner County (legend)

- Location within Kansas Location within the United States
- Coordinates: 37°21′55″N 97°31′47″W
- Country: United States
- State: Kansas
- County: Sumner
- Elevation: 1,303 ft (397 m)
- Time zone: UTC-6 (CST)
  - Summer (DST): UTC-5 (CDT)
- Area code: 620
- FIPS code: 20-01925
- GNIS ID: 470174

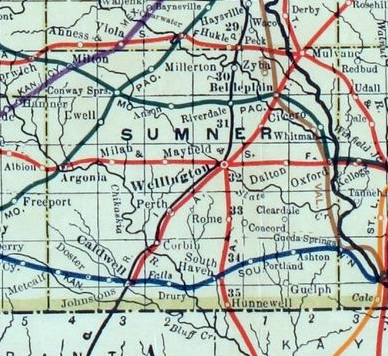
1915 railroad map of Sumner County

Anson is an unincorporated community in Sumner County, Kansas, United States. It is located about 6 miles east of Conway Springs at 1.5 miles south of the intersection of N Anson Rd and W 90th St N, next to an abandoned railroad.

== History ==
A post office was opened in Anson in 1887, and remained in operation until it was discontinued in 1958.

A railroad previously passed through the community, east to west, from Belle Plaine to Conway Springs.

== Education ==
The community is served by Conway Springs USD 356 public school district.
