= Bradgate, Iowa =

- City
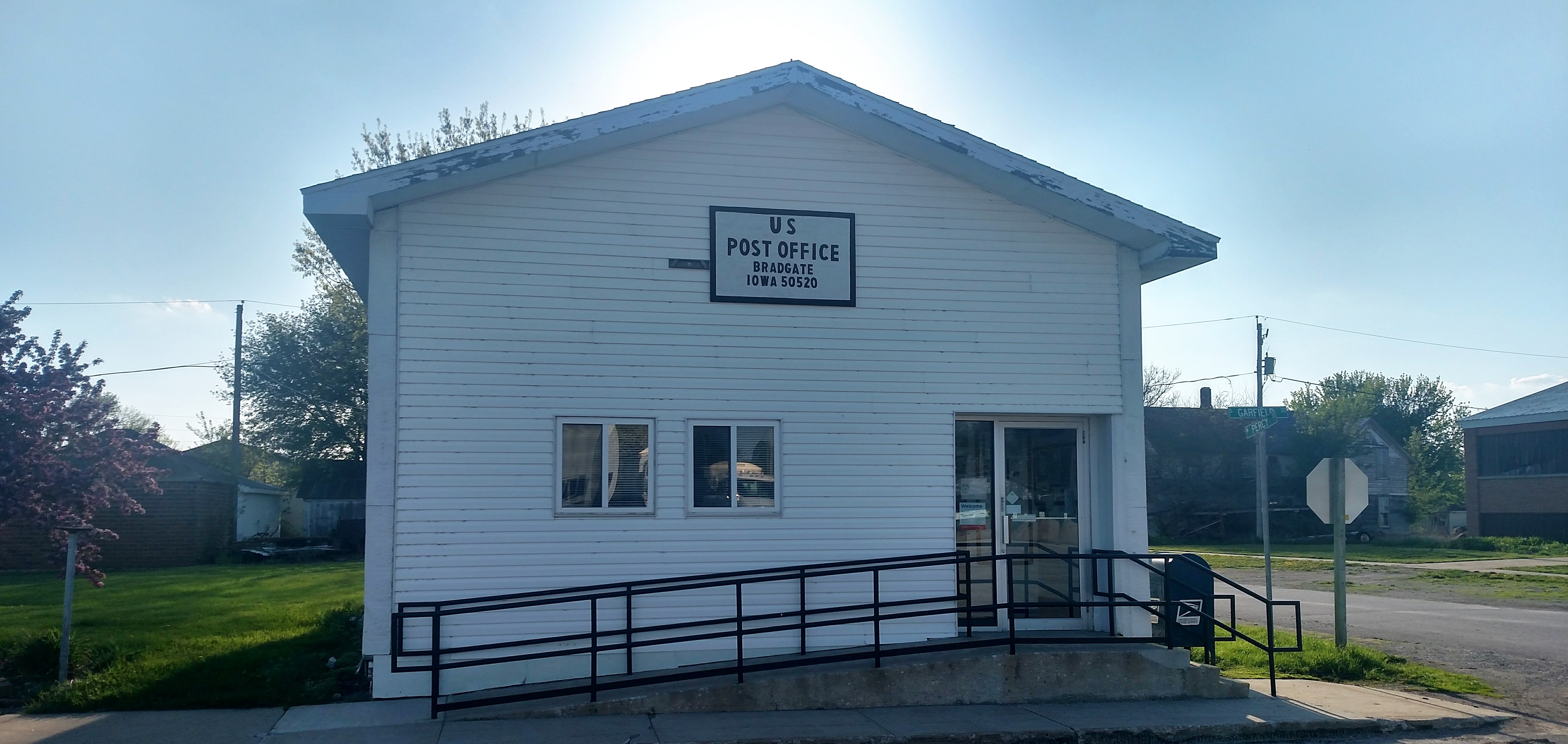
- Post office
- Motto: The town that wouldn’t die
- Location of Bradgate, Iowa
- Coordinates: 42°48′11″N 94°25′12″W
- Country: United States
- State: Iowa
- County: Humboldt
- Incorporated: June 20, 1893

Area
  - Total: 0.53 sq mi (1.37 km^{2})
  - Land: 0.52 sq mi (1.35 km^{2})
  - Water: 0.0039 sq mi (0.01 km^{2})
- Elevation: 1,119 ft (341 m)

Population (2020)
  - Total: 75
  - Density: 143.4/sq mi (55.36/km^{2})
- Time zone: UTC-6 (Central (CST))
  - Summer (DST): UTC-5 (CDT)
- ZIP code: 50520
- Area code: 515
- FIPS code: 19-08065
- GNIS feature ID: 2394235

Bradgate is a city in Humboldt County, Iowa, United States, at the conjunction of Sections 5, 6, 7, and 8 of Avery Township, and rests near the banks of the West Fork of the Des Moines River. The population was 75 in the 2020 census, a decline from 101 in 2000.

On May 21, 2004, the town was almost completely destroyed by a tornado.

== History ==
=== Last battle between two Iowa American Indian tribes ===
Nearby Avery's Hill was the site of a significant event in Iowa history. The last battle between two American Indian tribes in Iowa was fought on this hill in 1854 between the Sioux and the Winnebagos.

Some eighteen Sioux warriors under the leadership of Coustawa (Big Tree) surprised the tribe of Winnebago but were driven back after the death of Coustawa. One of the Sioux warriors was reported to be Inkpaduta, who later led a band of Sioux in the famed Spirit Lake Massacre. The Pocahontas County Historical Society has marked the battle spot on the former Clarence Stearns farm with a flag pole and plaque memorial.

A few area residents of Bradgate and surrounding community have acquired large collections of American Indian artifacts, including arrowheads, discovered during walks along the river and on Avery's Hill.

=== The early days and origin of name ===
The first settlement just east of present Bradgate (Section 8) was named Willow Glen with no record of why this name was chosen. However, when the town was platted, the name was changed to Bradgate. Several theories are given as to why this name was chosen but the one accepted by most is that Bradgate was named after Bradgate Park at Newtown Linford, six miles northwest of Leicester in Leicestershire County, England. Likewise, just as Leicestershire County is located just west of Rutland County in England, the town of Bradgate, Iowa, is similarly located just six miles to the northwest of the town of Rutland in Humboldt County, Iowa. There were at least seven English families who left England and moved directly to the Bradgate, Iowa, area.

Bradgate was platted by the Western Town Lot Company in 1881–1882 on the Toledo branch of the Chicago and North Western Railway in Avery Township of Humboldt County. The plat was filed for record on March 7, 1882. The post office was established April 7, 1882.

Cord N. King came to Avery Township in 1864 and purchased 247 acres. He farmed this land and operated a grocery store. Much of the land was donated to the railroad by Cord N. King. It was hoped that the terminal would be built at this spot, but after the entire valley of the Des Moines River flooded on July 7, 1881, it was decided to move the terminal to Eagle Grove.

John Wesley King built a house near the post office and became the town's first postmaster.

=== "The town that wouldn’t die" ===
In the summer of 1950, three people from Life Magazine spent a number of days in Bradgate taking numerous pictures and interviewing nearly everyone for a special profile on a small Iowa town. When the article came to be published, residents were anxious to read the story which profiled their farm community. But when the August 1950 issue appeared, all were disappointed. Bradgate was pictured as a dying town.

This has remained a sore spot in the years since and in 1976, the motto “The town that wouldn’t die” was chosen to commemorate the community's resolve to withstand the dire premonition and continue forward.

=== 2004 Tornado ===
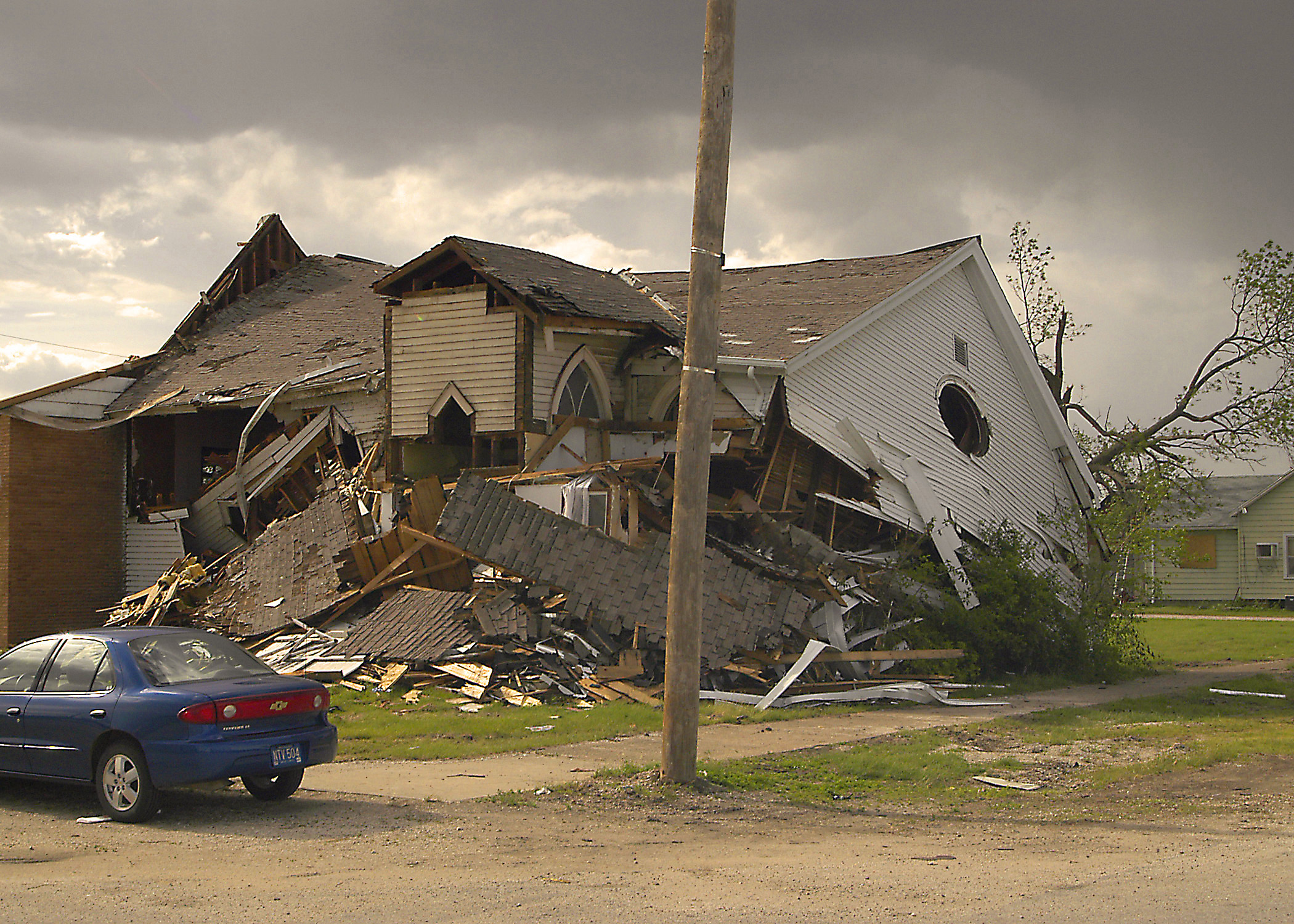
Methodist church destroyed in the 2004 tornado

On May 21, 2004, a tornado rated F2 struck the town of Bradgate causing widespread damage. The National Weather Service reported that a tornado struck near Rolfe at 6:10 p.m. and hit Bradgate at 6:23 p.m. The tornado severely damaged 30 of the 42 homes in Bradgate. The only building in town that did not receive damage was the new fire station. Though fifteen people sustained minor injuries from flying debris, residents were grateful there were no fatalities.

The tornado that started near Rolfe continued on a 16-mile journey, damaging farm houses, trees, and power lines along the way. MidAmerican Energy power lines and poles, from Rutland north to the Bradgate blacktop, were toppled over the roadway. A storm damage survey team from the National Weather Service in Des Moines rated the tornado F2 in strength. A tornado rated F2 has estimated winds of 113-157 mph, based upon estimates in the Fujita Scale.

== Geography ==
According to the United States Census Bureau, the city has a total area of 0.35 square miles (0.91 km^{2}), all land.

== Demographics ==
Historical population
Census	Pop.	Note	%±
1900	223		—
1910	175		−21.5%
1920	230		31.4%
1930	223		−3.0%
1940	261		17.0%
1950	188		−28.0%
1960	166		−11.7%
1970	130		−21.7%
1980	151		16.2%
1990	124		−17.9%
2000	101		−18.5%
2010	86		−14.9%
2020	75		−12.8%
U.S. Decennial Census

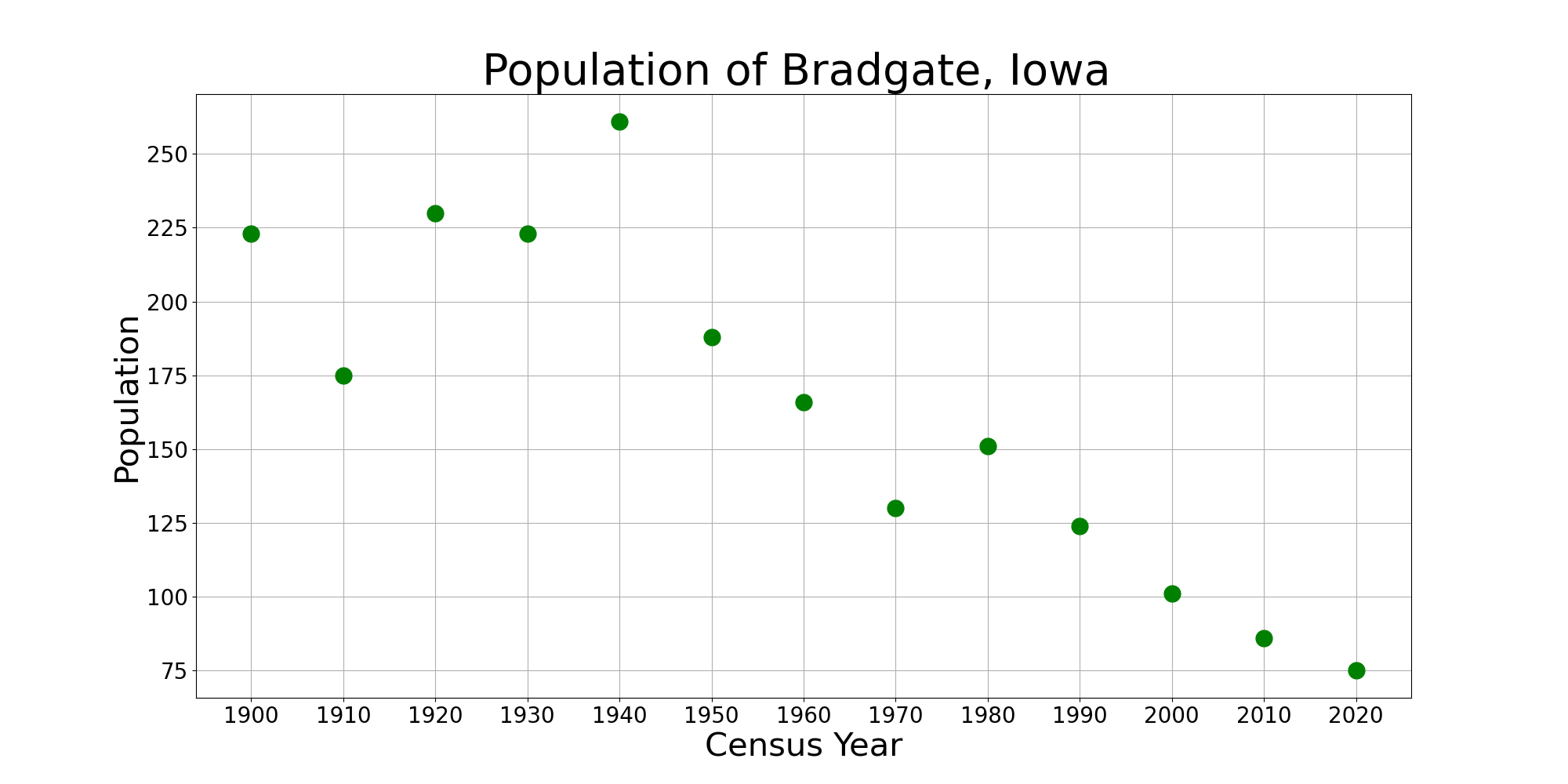
The population of Bradgate, Iowa from US census data

=== 2020 census ===
As of the census of 2020, there were 75 people, 33 households, and 18 families residing in the city. The population density was 143.4 inhabitants per square mile (55.4/km^{2}). There were 38 housing units at an average density of 72.6 per square mile (28.0/km^{2}). The racial makeup of the city was 88.0% White, 0.0% Black or African American, 0.0% Native American, 0.0% Asian, 0.0% Pacific Islander, 5.3% from other races and 6.7% from two or more races. Hispanic or Latino persons of any race comprised 6.7% of the population.

Of the 33 households, 24.2% of which had children under the age of 18 living with them, 36.4% were married couples living together, 9.1% were cohabitating couples, 21.2% had a female householder with no spouse or partner present and 33.3% had a male householder with no spouse or partner present. 45.5% of all households were non-families. 36.4% of all households were made up of individuals, 12.1% had someone living alone who was 65 years old or older.

The median age in the city was 45.5 years. 32.0% of the residents were under the age of 20; 1.3% were between the ages of 20 and 24; 16.0% were from 25 and 44; 30.7% were from 45 and 64; and 20.0% were 65 years of age or older. The gender makeup of the city was 49.3% male and 50.7% female.

=== 2010 census ===
As of the census of 2010, there were 86 people, 37 households, and 25 families residing in the city. The population density was 245.7 inhabitants per square mile (94.9/km^{2}). There were 40 housing units at an average density of 114.3 per square mile (44.1/km^{2}). The racial makeup of the city was 100.0% White. Hispanic or Latino of any race were 2.3% of the population.

There were 37 households, of which 27.0% had children under the age of 18 living with them, 51.4% were married couples living together, 8.1% had a female householder with no husband present, 8.1% had a male householder with no wife present, and 32.4% were non-families. 27.0% of all households were made up of individuals, and 10.8% had someone living alone who was 65 years of age or older. The average household size was 2.32 and the average family size was 2.76.

The median age in the city was 44.3 years. 22.1% of residents were under the age of 18; 5.8% were between the ages of 18 and 24; 25.5% were from 25 to 44; 29% were from 45 to 64; and 17.4% were 65 years of age or older. The gender makeup of the city was 54.7% male and 45.3% female.

=== 2000 census ===
As of the census of 2000, there were 101 people, 48 households, and 30 families residing in the town. The population density was 291.1 inhabitants per square mile (112.4/km^{2}). There were 54 housing units at an average density of 155.6 per square mile (60.1/km^{2}). The racial makeup of the city was 100.00% White.

There were 48 households, out of which 18.8% had children under the age of 18 living with them, 56.3% were married couples living together, 6.3% had a female householder with no husband present, and 37.5% were non-families. 31.3% of all households were made up of individuals, and 6.3% had someone living alone who was 65 years of age or older. The average household size was 2.10 and the average family size was 2.63.

In the town the population was spread out, with 15.8% under the age of 18, 8.9% from 18 to 24, 22.8% from 25 to 44, 33.7% from 45 to 64, and 18.8% who were 65 years of age or older. The median age was 46 years. For every 100 females, there were 114.9 males. For every 100 females age 18 and over, there were 117.9 males.

The median income for a household in the town was $30,000, and the median income for a family was $44,375. Males had a median income of $27,500 versus $15,625 for females. The per capita income for the town was $16,407. There were 8.0% of families and 16.8% of the population living below the poverty line, including 27.8% of under eighteens and none of those over 64.

== Parks and recreation ==
=== Avery's Hill ===
One of the local tourist spots is Avery's Hill, located to the west of town above the West Fork of the Des Moines River, and like the township, named after Oscar F. Avery, the area's first settler who came to farm. The hill is visited for its nature, wildlife, and mushroom hunts. Avery built his house in November 1859 and planted corn the following spring.

Avery's Hill is a wildlife refuge and a place where several generations of area youngsters have engaged in sledding or tobogganing down the large expansive hill.

During the 1920s, an effort was unsuccessfully made to make Avery's Hill into a park. In 1976, after private ownership of the land had changed hands, an effort was successfully made to prevent further tilling and destruction of the scenic area.

The hill was the site of a significant event in Iowa history. The last battle between two American Indian tribes in Iowa was fought on this hill in 1854 between the Sioux and the Winnebagos.

=== Bradgate State Fishing Access ===
The Bradgate State Fishing Access is one of over 140 state parks, forests, and wildlife refuges in Iowa. The Access is one of several fishing areas along the West Fork of the Des Moines River located on Bradgate's southern edge.

=== Three Rivers Bike Trail ===
The Three Rivers Bike Trail, constructed on an abandoned railroad grade, is a recreational bike trail system that passes through town. Completed in 1991, one of its features is its crossing over the West Fork of the Des Moines River on the town's west edge. The "Three Rivers" refers to both the East and West Forks of the Des Moines River and to the Boone River, all of which it spans.

The 35 mile route stretches from Rolfe in Pocahontas County to Eagle Grove in Wright County with access points in Bradgate, Rutland, Dakota City, and Thor. The trail has forested river lowlands on the western end, and small towns, numerous bridges, and open farmlands on the eastern end.

== Education ==
Children from the town of Bradgate and surrounding community are enrolled in the Gilmore City–Bradgate Community School District.

== Twin town ==
Bradgate is the twin town of Newtown Linford near Bradgate Park in Leicestershire, England.
