= Tornadoes of 2004 =

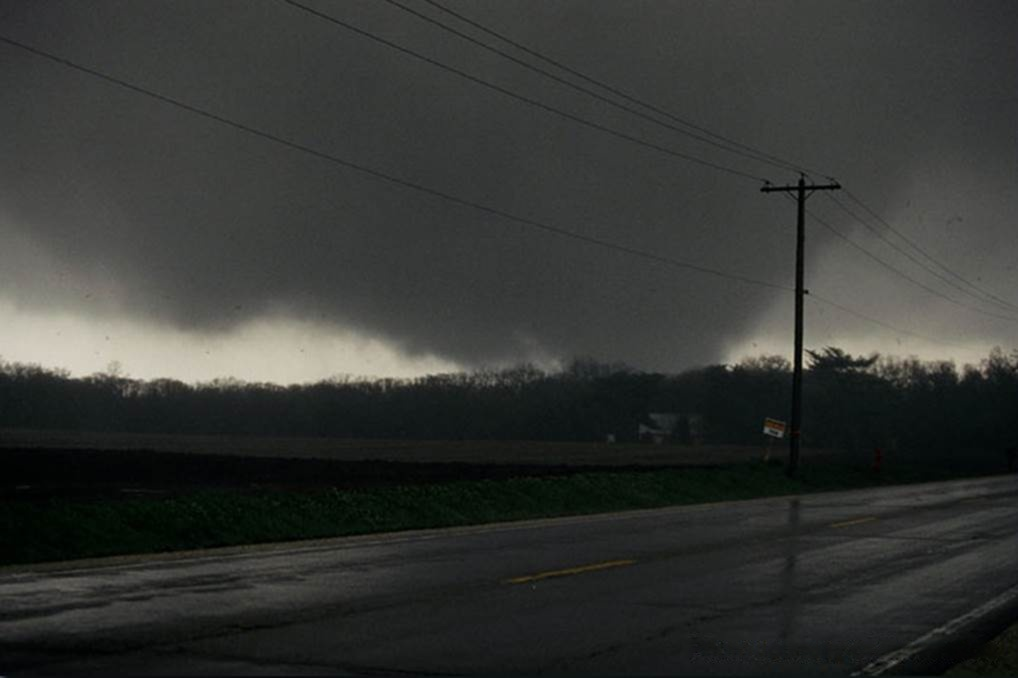
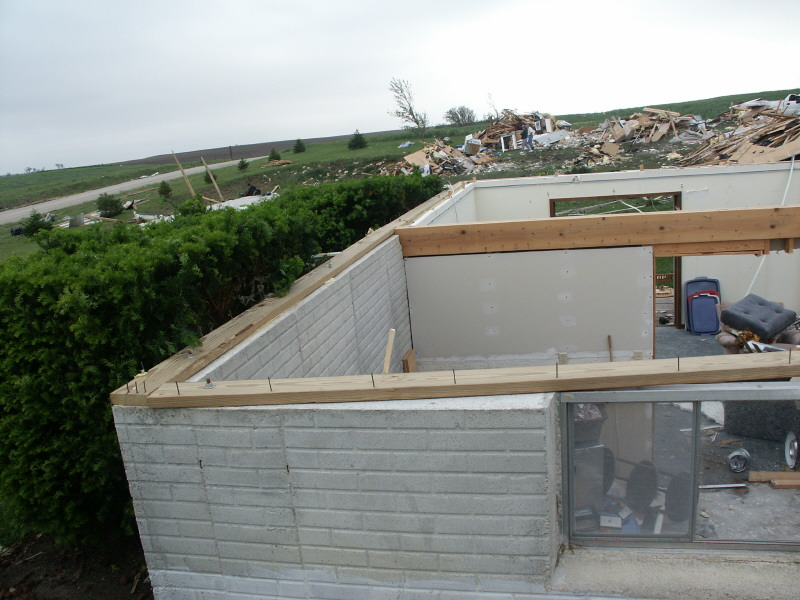
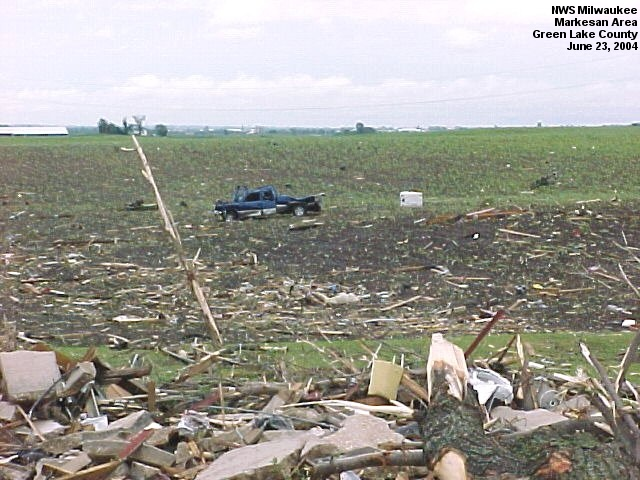
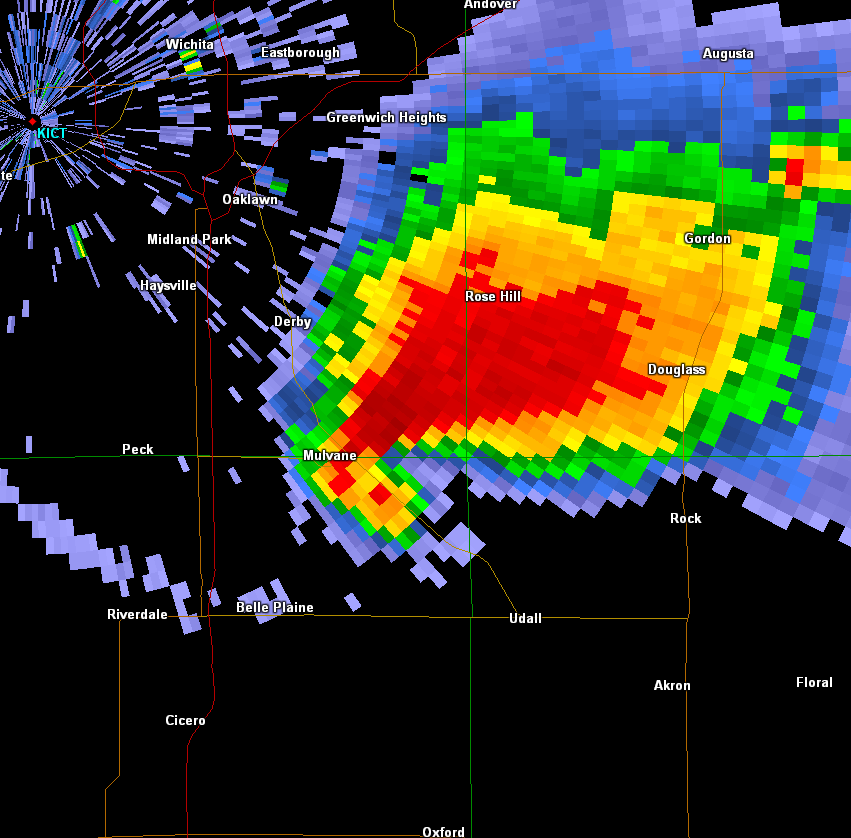
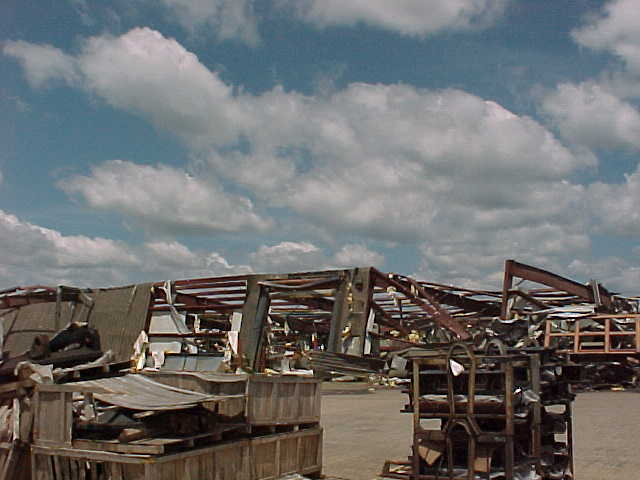
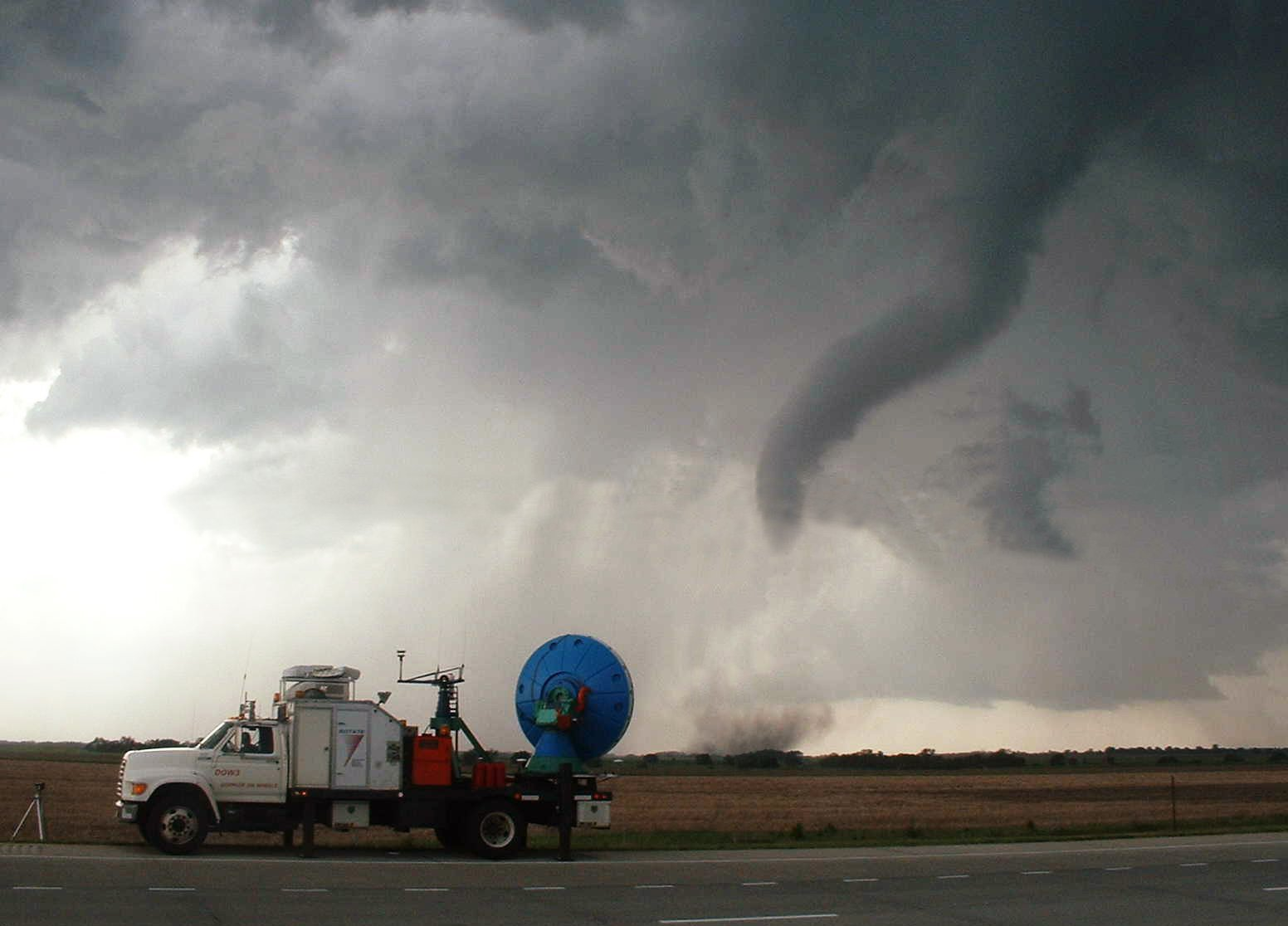
- Clockwise from top: A large F3 tornado approaching Utica, Illinois on April 20; F3 damage to a home in rural Green Lake County, Wisconsin after a tornado on June 23; The Parsons Manufacturing Plant near Roanoke, Illinois after an F4 tornado on July 13; A Doppler on Wheels vehicle observing a tornado near Attica, Kansas on May 12; A radar scan of a supercell producing a high-end F3 tornado near Mulvane, Kansas on June 12; F4 damage to a home near Hallam, Nebraska after a tornado on May 22.
- Timespan: January 17 – December 22, 2004
- Maximum rated tornado: F4 tornado: Harper, Kansas on May 12; Hallam, Nebraska on May 22; Weatherby, Missouri on May 29; Roanoke, Illinois on July 13; Marion, North Dakota on July 18
- Tornadoes in U.S.: 1,817 (Record highest)
- Damage (U.S.): $552.3 million
- Fatalities (U.S.): 35
- Fatalities (worldwide): ≥215

This page documents notable tornadoes and tornado outbreaks worldwide in 2004. Strong and destructive tornadoes form most frequently in the United States, Bangladesh, and Eastern India, but they can occur almost anywhere under the right conditions. Tornadoes also develop occasionally in southern Canada during the Northern Hemisphere's summer and somewhat regularly at other times of the year across Europe, Asia, and Australia. Tornadic events are often accompanied with other forms of severe weather, including strong thunderstorms, strong winds, and hail.

The United States recorded more tornadoes during this year than any other year on record, with 1,817 touching down across the country. Despite the high number of confirmed tornadoes the number of fatalities related to tornadoes were below average.

== Events ==
=== United States yearly total ===
Confirmed tornadoes by Fujita rating
FU	F0	F1	F2	F3	F4	F5	Total
0	1,216	470	103	23	5	0	1,817

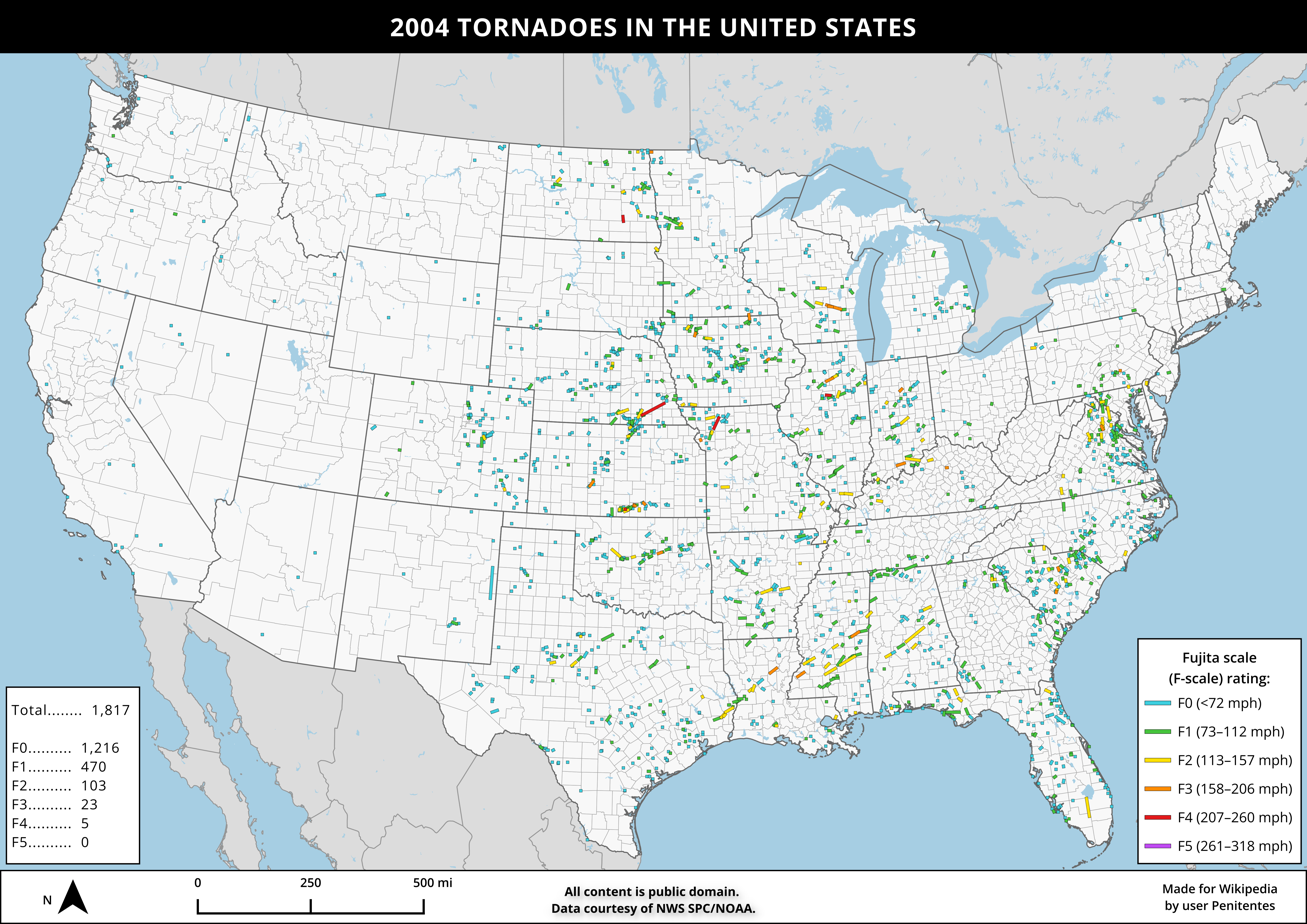
Map of 2004 United States tornado paths.

Fatal United States tornadoes in 2004
- Approximate touchdown location of killer tornadoes in 2004
Summary of tornadoes
- April 20 – Illinois (8 deaths)
- May 22 – Nebraska (1 death)
- May 24 – Illinois (1 death)
- May 29 – Missouri (3 deaths)
- May 30 – Indiana (1 death)
- May 30 – Missouri (1 death)
- June 23 – Wisconsin (1 death)
- June 26 – Texas (1 death)
- August 13 – North Carolina (3 deaths)
- September 15 – Florida (1 death)
- September 15 – Florida (1 death)
- September 15 – Florida (4 deaths)
- September 16 – Georgia (1 death)
- September 27 – South Carolina (1 death)
- October 18 – Missouri (3 deaths)
- November 23 – Texas (1 death)
- November 23 – Louisiana (1 death)
- November 24 – Mississippi (1 death)
- November 24 – Alabama (1 death)
Total fatalities: 35

== January ==
3 tornadoes were confirmed in the U.S.

== February ==
9 tornadoes were confirmed in the U.S.

=== February 5 ===
FU	F0	F1	F2	F3	F4	F5
3	0	2	1	0	0	0

6 tornadoes touched down on February 5, with the strongest being an F2, with a well-constructed home having visible damage on its roof. Hundreds of trees were uprooted or snapped, including 12" pine and cedar trees, with a large tree falling on a house. A fence was flattened, and a small barn was demolished. Other tornadoes include 2 tornadoes that produced no damage, and 2 F1 tornadoes that uprooted several trees, causing minor roof damage, and destroyed a utility shed. One tornado produced minor tree damage in Meadville to Georgetown, Mississippi.

== March ==
46 tornadoes were confirmed in the U.S.

=== March 4–5 ===
FU	F0	F1	F2	F3	F4	F5
0	17	10	2	0	0	0

On March 4, a large storm system produced 29 tornadoes across Texas into parts of Oklahoma. In addition to the tornadoes, heavy rain caused flooding in the Plains and an unusual derecho produced heavy damage, primarily in Texas.

=== March 27 ===
FU	F0	F1	F2	F3	F4	F5
0	13	3	0	1	0	0

== April ==
125 tornadoes were confirmed in the U.S.

=== April 7 (Ukraine) ===
A strong F2 (possibly F3) tornado struck the towns of Velikaya Kostromka and Pervoye-Maya in Ukraine on April 7, killing one person and damaging or destroying 130 homes.

=== April 14 (Bangladesh) ===
A powerful tornado struck portions of North-Central Bangladesh, killing 111 and injuring nearly 1,500 others, making it the deadliest tornado worldwide of the year.

=== April 20 ===
FU	F0	F1	F2	F3	F4	F5
0	18	10	2	1	0	0

A powerful tornado struck the town of Utica, Illinois. It was part of an outbreak of 30 tornadoes that formed in eastern Iowa, northern Illinois, and northern Indiana in a short period of time. The Utica tornado caused the only fatalities. Another tornado struck the city of Joliet, Illinois, causing US$5 million in damage to the historic district in town.

=== April 21 (China) ===
Seven people were killed and 207 injured by a tornado that appeared on the evening of April 21 in Hengyang, Hunan, China. 700 farmers were left homeless by the tornado, according to China Daily.

== May ==
509 tornadoes were confirmed in the U.S.

=== May 9 (China) ===
Two people were killed by a tornado in Huilai County, China. The tornado appeared shortly after noon, with wind speeds reaching up 49.4 m/s (110.5 mi/hr) and causing serious damage to several hundred homes.

=== May 12 ===
FU	F0	F1	F2	F3	F4	F5
0	5	1	3	0	1	0

The same storm system responsible for a small tornado outbreak and notable F2 tornado near Attica, was also responsible for a nighttime F4 tornado that passed near the town of Harper. The rating, however, is a source of controversy. At peak intensity, it completely erased a well-built, two-story farmhouse and scoured away top of basement walls in the process. Complete tree and shrub debarking, as well as deep ground scouring occurred within this tornado. Vehicles and farm equipment were mangled beyond recognition or torn apart and thrown long distances. Five barns adjacent to the farmhouse were also cleanly swept away. The reason for the F4 rating was that the tornado was very slow-moving, which may have added to the extent of the damage, despite the home was anchor-bolted to its foundation. A family survived the tornado underground in their basement; the family dog however, was killed.

=== May 22–30 ===
FU	F0	F1	F2	F3	F4	F5
0	241	115	23	8	2	0

An F4 tornado became the widest tornado ever recorded at the time at 2.5 miles (4.0 km) in diameter, forming on May 22. It caused one death and 37 injuries in the village of Hallam. It was later surpassed by a massive 2.6-mile (4.2 km) wide twister that occurred near El Reno, Oklahoma, on May 31, 2013. That tornado killed 8 people, including 4 storm chasers.

Beginning on May 29, after the Storm Prediction Center issued a high risk for severe weather, 149 tornadoes were confirmed in 32 hours, killing five people. Three of the fatalities were caused by an F4 tornado that struck near Weatherby, Missouri, during the evening of May 29. The Memorial Day Weekend outbreak is considered to be one of the most prolific in US history in terms of the number of tornadoes.

== June ==
268 tornadoes were confirmed in the U.S.

=== June 1 (Russia) ===
One June 1, at least 11 tornadoes touched down in Russia, including a high-end F3 that damaged or destroyed 342 homes.

=== June 9 (Europe) ===
FU	F0	F1	F2	F3	F4	F5
0	0	2	2	1	0	0

Several tornadoes touched down across northern Germany, the Czech Republic, and Hungary on June 9. At 14:30 UTC, an F3 tornado struck Litovel, injuring five people. A T4/F2 tornado injured one person in Lower Saxony, and another F2 tornado struck Budapest.

=== June 9 (Philippines) ===
A tornado was spawned by Tropical Storm Chanthu (Gener) struck Dulag, Leyte where it flattened houses, uprooted coconut trees. It destroyed around 900 houses, killed an elderly man, injured four people, and left 12 people missing. On the nearby island of Samar, the tornado also killed a fisherman and left six others missing after it overturned two fishing boats.

=== June 10–13 ===
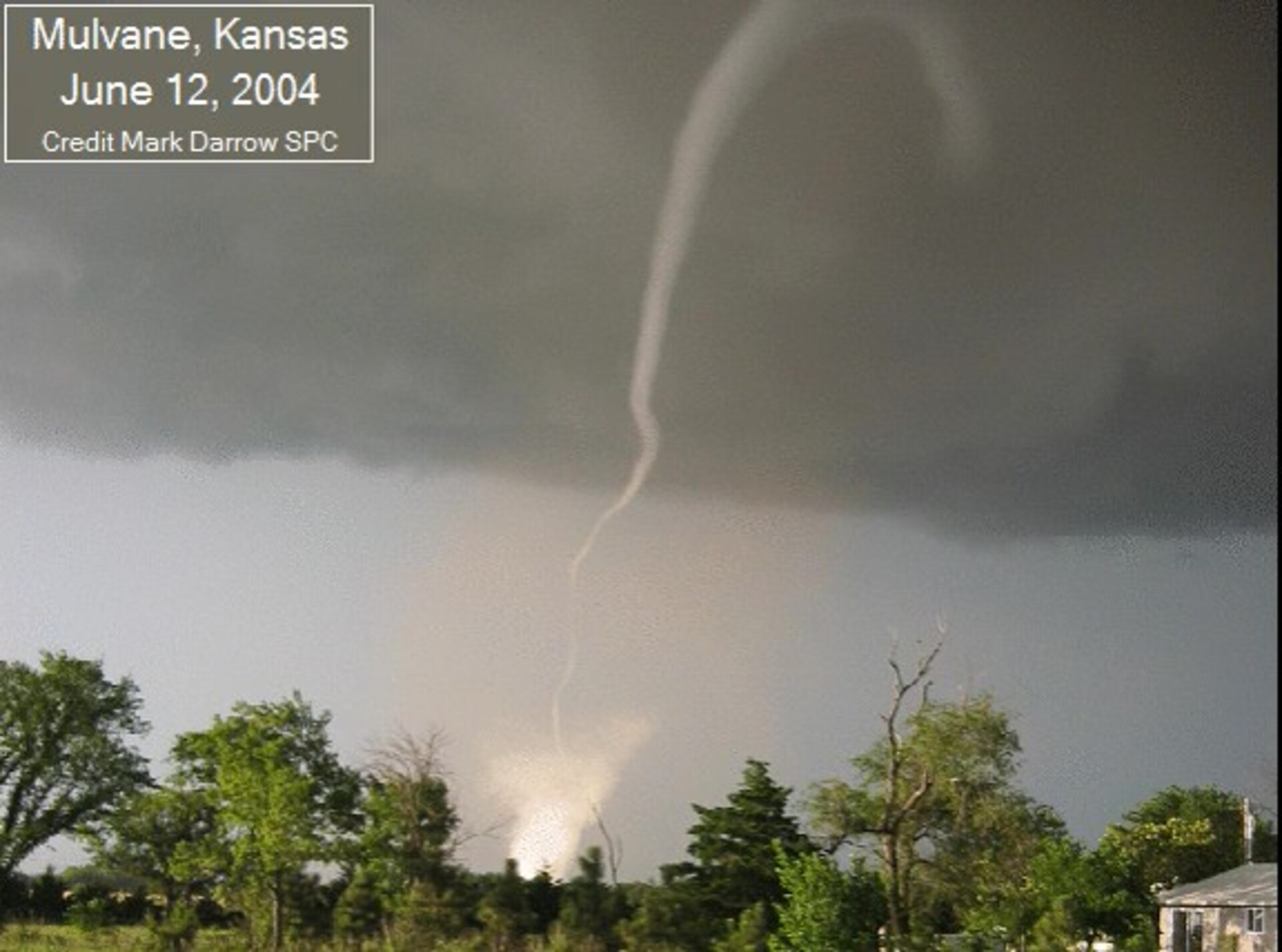
A high-end F3 tornado near Mulvane, Kansas on June 12.

The first day of the three-day tornado outbreak saw several weak tornadoes across Illinois, South Dakota, Colorado, Nebraska, and Wyoming. One of these tornadoes are well documented by several chasers and this tornado damaged a farmstead, destroying two trailers while leaving one slightly damaged, injuring two in an overturned vehicle pulling an U-haul trailer, overturning a center pivot irrigation and unroofing couple of outbuildings in Chappell, Nebraska.

A small tornado outbreak began across the Midwestern United States on June 11, mainly in Iowa and Wisconsin. Most of the tornadoes that occurred this day were weak, being rated F0 or F1. However, a few strong tornadoes did touch down, the most significant being an F3 tornado that caused deep ground scouring and destroyed a home near Le Roy, Minnesota. Another F3 tornado touched down in Buena Vista County, Iowa, before moving towards Clay County, where it destroyed an iron bridge while damaging many crops as it raised a large debris cloud. A strong tornado developed in rural area of Mitchell County, Texas after sunset where it rolled a Ford Expedition at a considerable distance and destroyed eight trailers near the end of its life cycle, three motorists would be injured by this tornado. The next day would bring more tornadoes, this time mostly to Kansas. The first tornado was reported near Belle Plaine, which was rated F0. After the first tornado lifted, the same supercell produced another tornado, which would go on to impact structures near Mulvane. This F3 tornado directly hit an anchor-bolted frame house and completely swept it away. Cars from the garage were thrown over 1/4 mile (0.40 km) and mangled beyond recognition or crumpled into balls. Two inhabitants survived this tornado under the staircase in the basement. After the Mulvane tornado dissipated, another tornado touched down near Rock and was rated F0. This supercell would go on to produce several more tornadoes, all of which were rated F0.

The last day of the outbreak brought several weak tornadoes across Michigan, Nebraska, Ohio, and Tennessee. A large supercell spawned five weak tornadoes with twin F0 tornadoes that occurred in Lancaster County, where both tornadoes did some damage to trees and outbuildings. Overall, 46 tornadoes touched down during this outbreak.

=== June 18 (Russia) ===
On June 18, another F3 tornado touched down in Russia, injuring seven people.

=== June 19 (Turkey) ===
On June 19, an intense F3 tornado touched down in Turkey, killing 3 people and injuring 21. The tornado had a path length of 1 km and a path width of 150 m.

=== June 23 (Germany) ===
FU	F0	F1	F2	F3	F4	F5
0	0	3	2	1	0	0

A severe F3 tornado hit the Saxony-Anhalt villages of Micheln and Trebbichau. Both villages have suffered damage.

=== June 23 (Wisconsin) ===
FU	F0	F1	F2	F3	F4	F5
0	0	0	0	2	0	0

On June 23, two large F3 tornadoes hit the county of Green Lake.

=== June 27 (Japan) ===
On the morning of June 27, an F2 tornado hit the city of Saga in Saga Prefecture. According to the Japan Meteorological Agency, it damaged 345 homes and destroyed 15 others. 15 people suffered minor injuries.

== July ==
124 tornadoes were confirmed in the U.S.

=== July 7–9 (Poland) ===
FU	F0	F1	F2	F3	F4	F5
0	2	2	4	0	0	0

In Poland, a tornado touched down in Wiktorów and Borzęcin near Warsaw. 21 houses were damaged. One 36-year-old man lost his life after he was lifted off the ground by the tornado. An F2 tornado struck Jelonka and Kleszczele near Dubicze Cerkiewne, Podlaskie Voivodeship. 200 buildings were damaged. Skywarn Polska

=== July 13–15 (United States) ===
FU	F0	F1	F2	F3	F4	F5
0	17	4	0	1	1	0

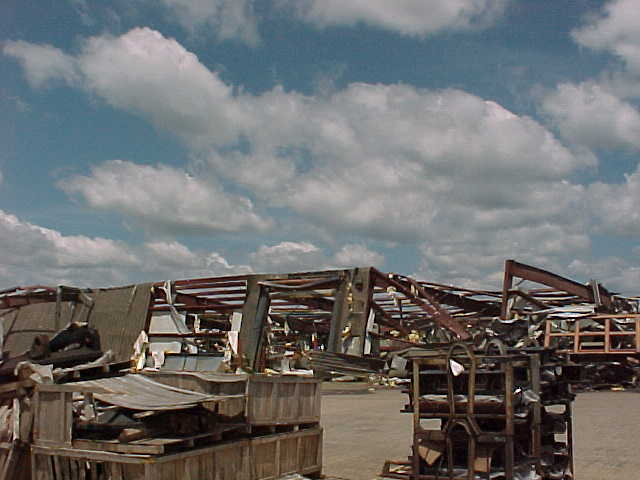
F4 damage inflicted to a manufacturing plant near Roanoke, Illinois.

On July 13, a large, violent F4 tornado struck Roanoke, Illinois, destroying the Parsons Manufacturing Plant and some civilian residences. Despite the extensive damage along its 9.6 miles (15.4 km) path of destruction, well advanced warning of the storm's approach led to only a few minor injuries and no fatalities. Three other F0 tornadoes were confirmed on this day as well.

On July 14, a large storm system passed over the Northeastern United States. It produced several severe storms and numerous tornadoes. The worst destruction was in Campbelltown, Pennsylvania, where 272 properties were damaged or destroyed by an F3 tornado that struck the town around 3:00 PM.

=== July 18 (North Dakota) ===
FU	F0	F1	F2	F3	F4	F5
0	5	1	2	0	1	0

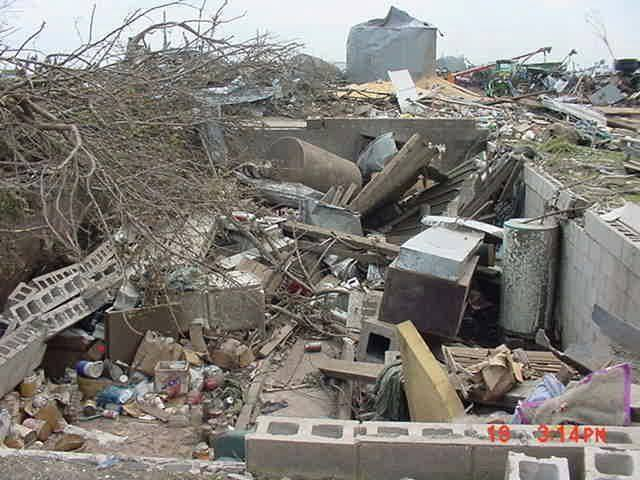
A farmhouse destroyed near Marion, North Dakota by an F4 tornado.

On July 18, a small but volatile tornado outbreak struck eastern North Dakota during the evening. Three of the tornadoes were significant, two were F2 tornadoes across both Cass and Steele Counties. The third tornado however, was a long-lived and highly visible F4 tornado that traveled southwards for 12 miles (19 km). This violent tornado obliterated several rural properties and farmhouses across southwestern Barnes and northern LaMoure Counties, especially near Litchville and Marion. A safe in one of the destroyed homes was ripped away from the basement and thrown miles away. No human injuries or fatalities were reported by any of the tornadoes from this localized event. At least 33 cattle were reportedly killed by the Barnes County F4 tornado. It was the first such rated tornado in eastern North Dakota since another F4 tornado struck near Mountain on June 6, 1999.

== August ==
179 tornadoes were confirmed in the U.S., setting a new record high for August, which stood until 2020.

=== August 11 (France) ===
On August 11, a waterspout moved onshore in Houat, France, damaging the harbor and village. One person was killed after being lifted off the ground by the tornado and falling on rocks, while twelve others were injured.

=== August 12 (Tropical Storm Bonnie) ===
FU	F0	F1	F2	F3	F4	F5
0	6	11	2	0	0	0

The second storm of the 2004 Atlantic hurricane season, Tropical Storm Bonnie caused minor damage while spawning several tornadoes when it made landfall several hours before Hurricane Charley. It spawned a tornado in Pender County, North Carolina, killing 3 and causing $1.27 million in damage. An F0 tornado also moved through Northwestern Jacksonville.

=== August 13–14 (Hurricane Charley) ===
FU	F0	F1	F2	F3	F4	F5
0	17	6	1	0	0	0

Charley Landfall

Hurricane Charley caused major damage along the Florida coast and the Mid-Atlantic while spawning several tornadoes including an F2 tornado.

=== August 4-15 (Philippines) ===
An extremely rare meteorological event occurred in the municipality of Valladolid, Negros Occidental, where four separate tornadoes struck the exact same town over an 11-day period. The sequence began on August 4, when a tornado touched down and uprooted a nipa hut. A second tornado struck on August 6, destroying one house and damaging two others. On August 8 at around 15:00 PhST, a third tornado struck two villages in the town, destroying nine houses and damaging 34 others; an 8-year-old boy was injured with minor burns after being hit by a live wire. The unprecedented sequence culminated on August 15 when a powerful EF1 tornado struck Valladolid, resulting in the destruction of 85 houses.

=== August 13 (New Zealand) ===
A destructive and deadly early-morning tornado struck Motunui, near the town of Waitara, in the Taranaki region of New Zealand. A farmhouse along Epiha Road was demolished. The four sleeping occupants were tossed from the property into nearby fields, with debris scattered up to 400 m away. Two of the occupants were killed, while the two others suffered serious injuries. 70 head of livestock were also killed. The roof of another farmhouse and a glass house were damaged by the tornado. Several power lines were taken out, with roughly 1,200 homes losing power. The tornado traveled for roughly 10 km and was 20 m wide. It was assessed as F3 on the Fujita scale, and remains the strongest on record in New Zealand.

== September ==
Exceptional tornado activity took place in September, with 297 tornadoes confirmed in the U.S. This set a monthly record for September, and more than doubled the previous record of 139 set in 1967. This mainly had to do with three very large outbreaks directly tied to tropical cyclones during the 2004 Atlantic Hurricane Season.

=== September 4–8 (Hurricane Frances) ===
FU	F0	F1	F2	F3	F4	F5
0	72	25	5	1	0	0

Hurricane Frances produced the third-highest number of tornadoes spawned by a single tropical cyclone. At the time of the outbreak, it was the second-highest but was surpassed by Hurricane Ivan later that month.

=== September 15–18 (Hurricane Ivan) ===
FU	F0	F1	F2	F3	F4	F5
0	48	52	18	1	0	0

Hurricane Ivan produced the highest number of tornadoes from a single tropical cyclone on record. During the storm's 3.5-day outbreak, 120 tornadoes touched down over eight states. The outbreak killed nine people, six of which were in Florida and four were from a single tornado.

=== September 25–28 (Hurricane Jeanne) ===
FU	F0	F1	F2	F3	F4	F5
0	28	12	2	0	0	0

Hurricane Jeanne was the final hurricane to strike the U.S. during the 2004 Atlantic hurricane season. It spawned several tornadoes upon and after its landfall. An F2 tornado killed one person and injured thirteen north of Ridgeway, South Carolina on September 27.

== October ==
79 tornadoes were confirmed in the U.S.

=== October 18–19 ===
FU	F0	F1	F2	F3	F4	F5
0	26	16	7	0	0	0

For these two days, a series of 49 tornadoes struck 28 counties in the U.S. across 6 states (Arkansas, Missouri, Alabama, Tennessee, Kentucky, and Illinois). One F2 tornado in Saline County, Arkansas resulted in 11 injuries and another F2 tornado in Pemiscot County, Missouri resulted in 3 deaths and 7 injuries. A total of 3 deaths and 30 injuries were reported for this two-day outbreak.

== November ==
150 tornadoes were confirmed in the U.S.

=== November 12–13 (Italy and Tunisia) ===
FU	F0	F1	F2	F3	F4	F5
0	0	2	4	1	0	0

Several powerful tornadoes struck southern Sicily and northern Tunisia on November 12 and 13. The first and most infamous tornado of this outbreak was a high-end F2 multiple-vortex tornado that touched down near Scicli on November 12 which inflicted roughly €25 million (US$32.4 million) in damage. Another tornado, rated F2, began just offshore Donnalucata before moving inland. The same day a weaker tornado tracked south of Catanzaro and injured nibe children. The following day, a long-tracked F2 tornado struck several towns in northern Tunisia, most notably Kelibia, El Haouaria, and Hammamet, killing 9–12 people and injuring 60–73 others. Three homes were completely destroyed by the tornado while many others sustained varying degrees of damage. Significant agricultural damage as well as loss of livestock also resulted from the storm. A third F2 touched down near Rakkada and injured 21 people. In light of the damage in Tunisia, the Tunisian Red Crescent society assisted approximately 200 affected persons with recovery funds and supplies. On the night of 13 november two other tornadoes touched down in Southern Italy: The first was an F1 tornado near Grottole that causes some damage to trees. Not much time after this, a powerful F3 tornado tracked through the countryside near the town of Matera, causing severe damage to trees, electric transmission towers, and partially collapsing a house.

=== November 20 (Philippines) ===
A strong tornado spawned by Typhoon Muifa (Unding) Struck Roxas, Oriental Mindoro where it damaged several houses, uprooted trees, and toppled power lines which resulted in power outages in the area. Around 12 people were reportedly killed by the tornado.

=== November 22–24 ===
FU	F0	F1	F2	F3	F4	F5
0	61	25	15	3	0	0

In late November, a significant three-day outbreak of tornadoes took place across the Southern United States. The outbreak began on the 22nd, producing six F0 tornadoes in Louisiana and Texas, three of which occurred in the Houston area. The tornadoes caused minimal damage and no injuries.

Tornado activity continued in the same general area on the 23rd. Early on, most of the touchdowns were weak, though an F2 tornado near Kountze, Texas damaged between 10 and 20 houses and killed a woman when trees crushed her mobile home. Several other tornadoes occurred in Texas throughout the afternoon, and soon began touch down in Louisiana as well. An F2 tornado struck the town of Hutton, damaging about 15 houses and injuring three people. Further north, an F3 tornado touched down and ripped directly through the town of Olla, where major damage occurred. A high school in town sustained significant damage, along with 106 homes. Some of the homes only had interior rooms left. A pickup truck outside of town was thrown 200 feet, and in the nearby town of Standard, four homes and a store were destroyed. Overall, the tornado killed one person and injured 20 others. Another F3 touched down near Fayette, Mississippi, destroying a steel-frame shed, damaging several homes, and flattening large swaths of trees.

Vigorous tornado activity continued on the 24th, mainly across Mississippi and Alabama. However, an F2 tornado tore through the northwest side of Slidell, Louisiana, damaging 152 homes in a single subdivision and injuring four people. Numerous tornadoes touched down in Mississippi, with the strongest being an F3 tornado that passed near Noxapater. The tornado downed hundreds of trees, tossed vehicles, and destroyed chicken houses. A house was completely destroyed, resulting in a fatality and two injuries. In Alabama, a large F2 tracked across Autauga, Chilton, and Coosa Counties. The tornado struck the Cooper community, resulting in major structural damage. Another F2 tornado touched down and struck the Talladega Superspeedway, where two concession stands within the infield area of the race track had their roofs blown off. The Bush Garage area received building damage, and the garage doors were bowed out. Debris was scattered between the garage area and Victory Lane. One digital leaderboard was completely destroyed, and another one sustained major damage. The tornado continued east through Eastaboga, where two homes suffered major roof damage, two porches were destroyed, and many trees were blown down. The tornado then struck Bynum, where downed trees heavily damaged two mobile homes, with a 75-year-old woman being killed in one of them. The tornado then caused roof and structural damage in Southern Anniston before dissipating. Overall, the outbreak produced 104 tornadoes and killed four people.

== December ==
26 tornadoes were confirmed in the U.S.

=== December 6–7 ===
FU	F0	F1	F2	F3	F4	F5
0	7	4	3	0	0	0

A small tornado outbreak took place in the Deep South on the evening of December 6 and early on December 7.

=== December 22 ===
This was the last tornado outbreak of 2004, with 16 tornadoes reported.

=== December 29 ===
Three tornadoes were reported in California.

== See also ==
- Weather of 2004
- Tornado
  - Tornadoes by year
  - Tornado records
  - Tornado climatology
  - Tornado myths
- List of tornado outbreaks
  - List of F5 and EF5 tornadoes
  - List of F4 and EF4 tornadoes
  - List of North American tornadoes and tornado outbreaks
  - List of 21st-century Canadian tornadoes and tornado outbreaks
  - List of European tornadoes and tornado outbreaks
  - List of tornadoes and tornado outbreaks in Asia
  - List of Southern Hemisphere tornadoes and tornado outbreaks
  - List of tornadoes striking downtown areas
  - List of tornadoes with confirmed satellite tornadoes
- Tornado intensity
  - Fujita scale
  - Enhanced Fujita scale
  - International Fujita scale
  - TORRO scale
