= Chester, Nebraska =

Village in Thayer County, Nebraska, United States

- Village
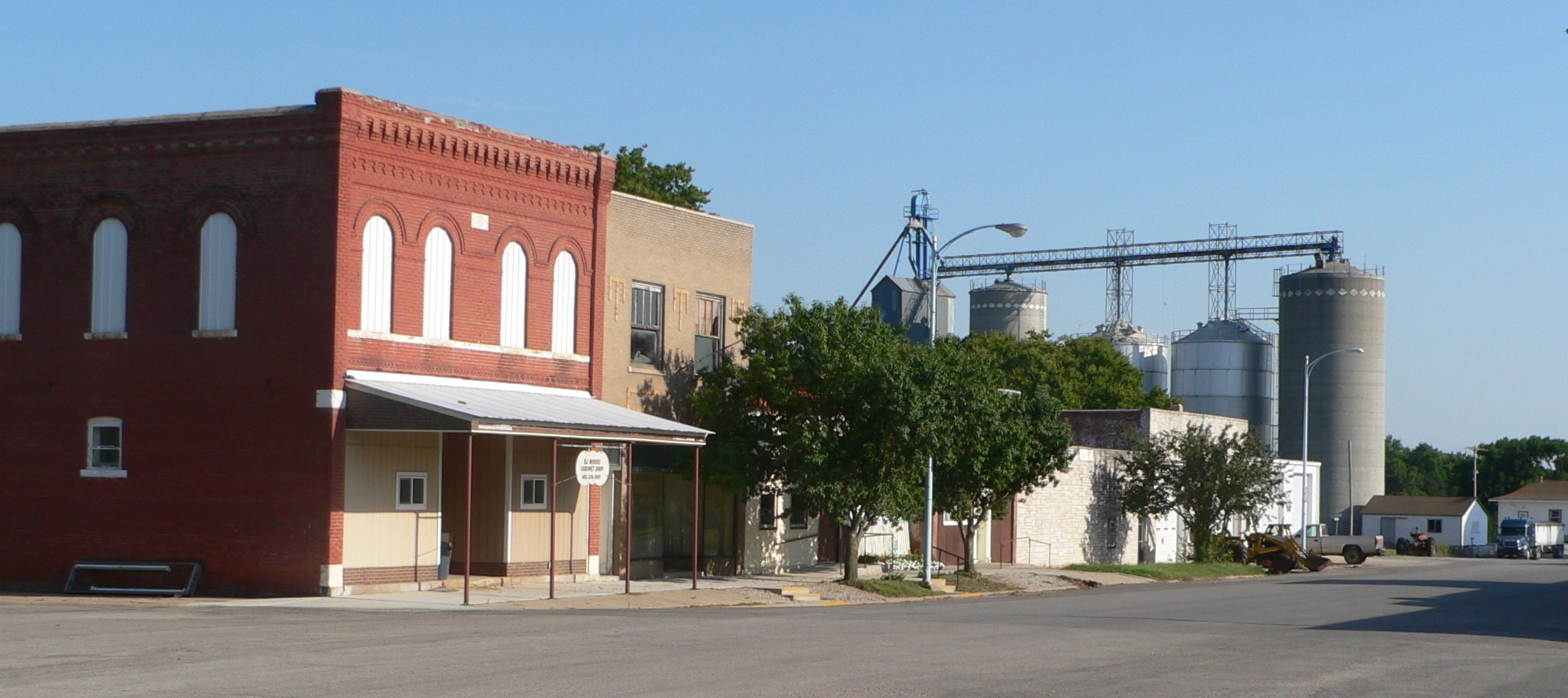
- Downtown Chester, August 2011

- Location of Chester, Nebraska
- Coordinates: 40°00′37″N 97°37′05″W
- Country: United States
- State: Nebraska
- County: Thayer

Area
  - Total: 0.59 sq mi (1.52 km^{2})
  - Land: 0.59 sq mi (1.52 km^{2})
  - Water: 0 sq mi (0.00 km^{2})
- Elevation: 1,627 ft (496 m)

Population (2020)
  - Total: 226
  - Estimate (2021): 220
  - Density: 385/sq mi (149/km^{2})
- Time zone: UTC-6 (Central (CST))
  - Summer (DST): UTC-5 (CDT)
- ZIP codes: 68327, 68429
- Area code: 402
- FIPS code: 31-09095
- GNIS feature ID: 2397616
- Website: www.chesterne.com

Chester is a village in Thayer County, Nebraska, United States. The population was 226 at the 2020 census.

Chester is notable as being the birthplace of six-man football.

Chester's annual celebration, Chesterfest is held the last weekend in June and features vendors, tournaments, car show, kid games, among other attractions, and the ever popular Sat. evening Concert.

== History ==
Chester was platted in 1880 when the railroad was extended to that point. It was named for President Chester A. Arthur.

== Geography ==
According to the United States Census Bureau, the village has a total area of 0.59 square miles (1.53 km^{2}), all land.

== Demographics ==
Historical population
| Census | Pop. | Note | %± |
|---|---|---|---|
| 1890 | 407 | | — |
| 1900 | 439 | | 7.9% |
| 1910 | 560 | | 27.6% |
| 1920 | 529 | | −5.5% |
| 1930 | 579 | | 9.5% |
| 1940 | 634 | | 9.5% |
| 1950 | 539 | | −15.0% |
| 1960 | 480 | | −10.9% |
| 1970 | 459 | | −4.4% |
| 1980 | 435 | | −5.2% |
| 1990 | 351 | | −19.3% |
| 2000 | 294 | | −16.2% |
| 2010 | 232 | | −21.1% |
| 2020 | 224 | | −3.4% |
| 2021 (est.) | 220 | ▼ | −1.8% |
U.S. Decennial Census

=== 2010 census ===
At the 2010 census there were 232 people, 111 households, and 66 families in the village. The population density was 393.2 inhabitants per square mile (151.8/km^{2}). There were 150 housing units at an average density of 254.2 per square mile (98.1/km^{2}). The racial makeup of the village was 96.6% White, 0.4% Native American, 0.9% Asian, and 2.2% from two or more races.

Of the 111 households 18.0% had children under the age of 18 living with them, 55.9% were married couples living together, 1.8% had a female householder with no husband present, 1.8% had a male householder with no wife present, and 40.5% were non-families. 36.0% of households were one person and 18% were one person aged 65 or older. The average household size was 2.09 and the average family size was 2.74.

The median age in the village was 52.6 years. 19% of residents were under the age of 18; 2.1% were between the ages of 18 and 24; 16.8% were from 25 to 44; 33.2% were from 45 to 64; and 28.9% were 65 or older. The gender makeup of the village was 47.8% male and 52.2% female.

=== 2000 census ===
At the 2000 census there were 294 people, 140 households, and 83 families in the village. The population density was 537.7 inhabitants per square mile (207.6/km^{2}). There were 180 housing units at an average density of 329.2 per square mile (127.1/km^{2}). The racial makeup of the village was 98.30% White, 1.02% Native American, and 0.68% from two or more races. Hispanic or Latino of any race were 0.68%.

Of the 140 households 20.7% had children under the age of 18 living with them, 52.1% were married couples living together, 2.1% had a female householder with no husband present, and 40.7% were non-families. 37.9% of households were one person and 22.1% were one person aged 65 or older. The average household size was 2.10 and the average family size was 2.73.

The age distribution was 19.7% under the age of 18, 4.4% from 18 to 24, 21.8% from 25 to 44, 26.5% from 45 to 64, and 27.6% 65 or older. The median age was 48 years. For every 100 females, there were 102.8 males. For every 100 females age 18 and over, there were 96.7 males.

The median household income was $21,389, and the median family income was $30,000. Males had a median income of $22,750 versus $17,000 for females. The per capita income for the village was $14,150. About 5.3% of families and 7.6% of the population were below the poverty line, including none of those under the age of eighteen and 15.4% of those sixty five or over.

== See also ==
- List of municipalities in Nebraska
