= Vincennes, Iowa =

- Unincorporated community
- Location in Iowa Location in the United States
- Coordinates: 40°29′47″N 91°34′12″W
- Country: United States
- State: Iowa
- County: Lee
- Elevation: 554 ft (169 m)
- Time zone: UTC-6 (Central (CST))
  - Summer (DST): UTC-5 (CDT)
- GNIS feature ID: 462576

Vincennes is an unincorporated community in the southern part of Lee County, Iowa, United States. It lies near the junction of 320th Street and Iowa Highway 27, 2.5 miles (4.0 km) south of Argyle.

== History ==
A post office named Camargo began operations in 1852. The name was changed to Vincennes in 1858. The post office at Vincennes closed in 1920.

Vincennes' population was estimated at 125 in 1877, was 128 in 1902, and was 115 in 1925. The population was 54 in 1940.

Vincennes was also known as Sand Point circa 1925.
