= Conway Springs USD 356 =

School district in Conway Springs, Kansas

Address
- 110 N. Monnett St. Conway Springs, Kansas, 67031; United States
- Coordinates: 37°23′28″N 97°38′51″W

District information
- Type: Public
- Grades: K to 12
- Schools: 3

Other information
- Website: usd356.org

Conway Springs USD 356 is a public unified school district headquartered in Conway Springs, Kansas, United States. The district includes the communities of Conway Springs, Viola, Anson, and nearby rural areas.

== Schools ==
The school district currently has three schools:

- Conway Springs High School
- Conway Springs Middle School
- Kyle Trueblood Elementary

== See also ==
- Kansas State Department of Education
- Kansas State High School Activities Association
- List of high schools in Kansas
- List of unified school districts in Kansas
