= Conway Springs, Kansas =

City in Sumner County, Kansas

- City
- Location within Sumner County and Kansas

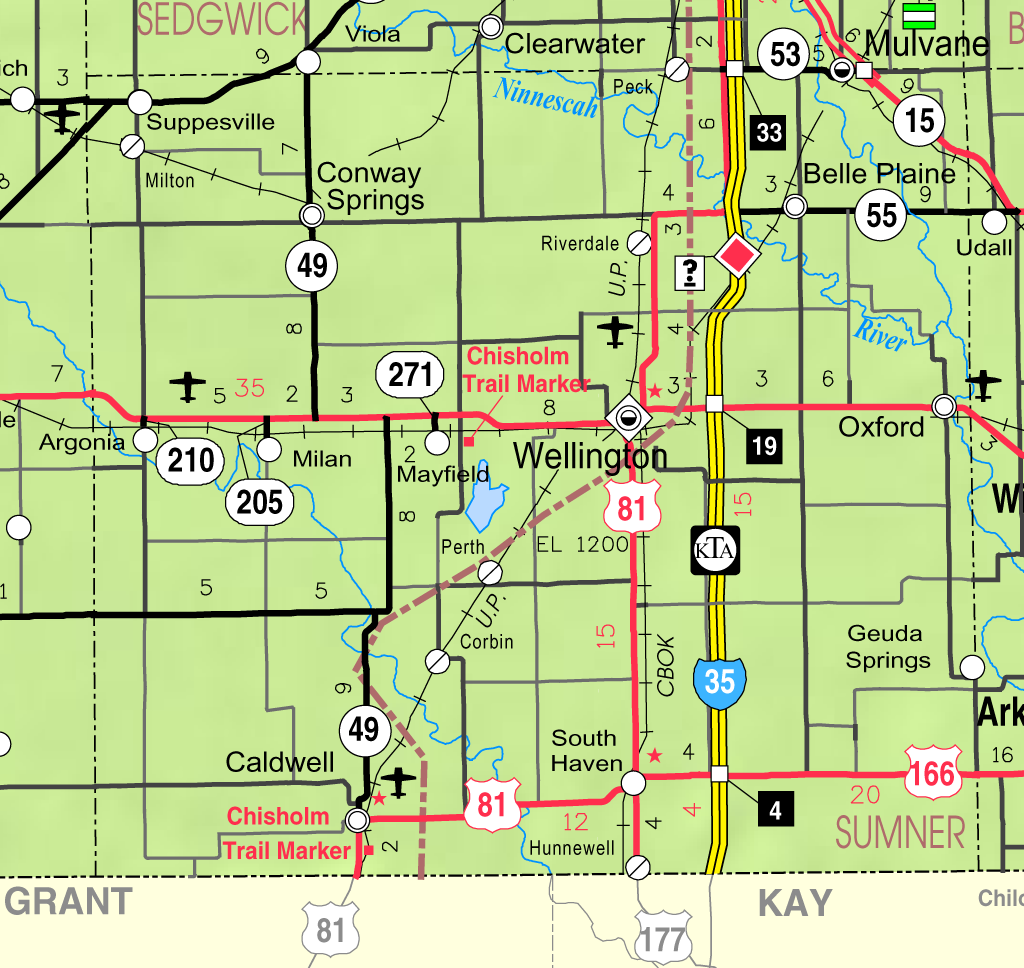
- KDOT map of Sumner County (legend)
- Coordinates: 37°23′22″N 97°38′33″W
- Country: United States
- State: Kansas
- County: Sumner
- Township: Conway
- Founded: 1884
- Incorporated: 1886
- Named for: Conway Township and nearby mineral spring

Area
  - Total: 0.99 sq mi (2.56 km^{2})
  - Land: 0.99 sq mi (2.56 km^{2})
  - Water: 0 sq mi (0.00 km^{2})
- Elevation: 1,375 ft (419 m)

Population (2020)
  - Total: 1,086
  - Density: 1,100/sq mi (424/km^{2})
- Time zone: UTC-6 (CST)
  - Summer (DST): UTC-5 (CDT)
- ZIP Code: 67031
- Area code: 620
- FIPS code: 20-15325
- GNIS ID: 2393624
- Website: conwayspringsks.com

Conway Springs is a city in Sumner County, Kansas, United States. As of the 2020 census, the population of the city was 1,086.

== History ==
Conway Springs was founded in 1884. Its name is derived from both Conway Township and a mineral spring nearby.

Captain Hiram Cranmer built the first home in Conway Springs.

== Geography ==
According to the United States Census Bureau, the city has a total area of 0.82 square miles (2.12 km^{2}), all land.

=== Climate ===
The climate in this area is characterized by hot, humid summers and generally mild to cool winters. According to the Köppen Climate Classification system, Conway Springs has a humid subtropical climate, abbreviated "Cfa" on climate maps.

== Demographics ==
Historical population
| Census | Pop. | Note | %± |
|---|---|---|---|
| 1890 | 681 | | — |
| 1900 | 714 | | 4.8% |
| 1910 | 1,292 | | 81.0% |
| 1920 | 1,120 | | −13.3% |
| 1930 | 981 | | −12.4% |
| 1940 | 849 | | −13.5% |
| 1950 | 816 | | −3.9% |
| 1960 | 1,057 | | 29.5% |
| 1970 | 1,153 | | 9.1% |
| 1980 | 1,313 | | 13.9% |
| 1990 | 1,384 | | 5.4% |
| 2000 | 1,322 | | −4.5% |
| 2010 | 1,272 | | −3.8% |
| 2020 | 1,086 | | −14.6% |
U.S. Decennial Census

=== 2010 census ===
As of the census of 2010, there were 1,272 people, 450 households, and 313 families living in the city. The population density was 1,551.2 inhabitants per square mile (598.9/km^{2}). There were 506 housing units at an average density of 617.1 per square mile (238.3/km^{2}). The racial makeup of the city was 96.6% White, 0.6% African American, 0.6% Native American, 0.4% from other races, and 1.9% from two or more races. Hispanic or Latino of any race were 2.1% of the population.

There were 450 households, of which 40.2% had children under the age of 18 living with them, 56.9% were married couples living together, 8.4% had a female householder with no husband present, 4.2% had a male householder with no wife present, and 30.4% were non-families. 27.6% of all households were made up of individuals, and 12.8% had someone living alone who was 65 years of age or older. The average household size was 2.73 and the average family size was 3.38.

The median age in the city was 34.1 years. 32.5% of residents were under the age of 18; 6% were between the ages of 18 and 24; 23.4% were from 25 to 44; 21.5% were from 45 to 64; and 16.6% were 65 years of age or older. The gender makeup of the city was 47.2% male and 52.8% female.

=== 2000 census ===
As of the census of 2000, there were 1,322 people, 469 households, and 318 families living in the city. The population density was 1,684.6 inhabitants per square mile (650.4/km^{2}). There were 501 housing units at an average density of 638.4 per square mile (246.5/km^{2}). The racial makeup of the city was 97.05% White, 0.23% African American, 0.23% Native American, 1.13% from other races, and 1.36% from two or more races. Hispanic or Latino of any race were 1.29% of the population.

There were 469 households, out of which 38.2% had children under the age of 18 living with them, 55.2% were married couples living together, 10.2% had a female householder with no husband present, and 32.0% were non-families. 31.1% of all households were made up of individuals, and 16.2% had someone living alone who was 65 years of age or older. The average household size was 2.71 and the average family size was 3.46.

In the city, the population was spread out, with 33.5% under the age of 18, 7.2% from 18 to 24, 24.4% from 25 to 44, 17.5% from 45 to 64, and 17.4% who were 65 years of age or older. The median age was 34 years. For every 100 females, there were 86.2 males. For every 100 females age 18 and over, there were 78.7 males.

The median income for a household in the city was $37,566, and the median income for a family was $48,000. Males had a median income of $35,893 versus $21,875 for females. The per capita income for the city was $15,470. About 3.5% of families and 4.8% of the population were below the poverty line, including 3.7% of those under age 18 and 6.3% of those age 65 or over.

== Education ==
The community is served by Conway Springs USD 356 public school district.

== Notable people ==
- Lloyd Bishop (1890–1968), baseball player
- Harvey H. Nininger (1887–1986), born in Conway Springs
