= List of museums in Kansas =

This list of museums in Kansas is a list of museums, defined for this context as institutions (including nonprofit organizations, government entities, and private businesses) that collect and care for objects of cultural, artistic, scientific, or historical interest and make their collections or related exhibits available for public viewing. Also included are non-profit and university art galleries. Museums that exist only in cyberspace (i.e., virtual museums) are not included.

== Museums ==
Name	Location	County	Region	Area of study	Summary
1954 All-Electric House	Shawnee	Johnson	Northeast	Historic house	House decorated and outfitted with 1950s electrical appliances and furnishings
Ag Heritage Park	Alta Vista	Wabaunsee	Topeka metro	Agriculture	website, information, exhibits about historic agricultural life, includes tractors, combines, threshing machines, tools, household items
Albany Museum	Sabetha	Nemaha	Northeast	Open air	Complex includes a schoolhouse, railroad museum, windmill, caboose and other buildings
Allen County Museum	Iola	Allen	Southeast	Local history	Operated by the Allen County Historical Society, also the Old Jail Museum
Allen-Lambe House	Wichita	Sedgwick	South Central	Historic house	Designed by Frank Lloyd Wright
Amelia Earhart Birthplace Museum	Atchison	Atchison	Northeast	Biographical	Turn of the 20th century birth home of aviator Amelia Earhart
Anderson County Museum	Garnett	Anderson	East-Central	Local history	website, operated by the Anderson County Historical Society, also 1888 Harris House open for visitors by appointment
Atchison County Historical Museum	Atchison	Atchison	Northeast	Local history	Exhibits on Lewis and Clark, Amelia Earhart, Jesse Stone, area railroad history, gun collection, located in a historic 1880 Santa Fe Freight depot
Augusta Historical Museum	Augusta	Butler	South Central	Local history	website, local history museum and C. N. James Log Cabin, operated by the Augusta Historical Society
Bancroft Depot Museum	Bancroft	Nemaha	Northeast	Local history	Exhibits about Bancroft and the Kansas City, Wyandotte and Northwestern Railroad
Barton County Historical Society Museum and Village	Great Bend	Barton	South Central	Open air	website
Basehor Historical Museum	Basehor	Leavenworth	Northeast	Local history	Operated by the Basehor Historical Society
Baxter Springs Heritage Center & Museum	Baxter Springs	Cherokee	Southeast	Local history	website, operated by the Baxter Springs Historical Society
Benson Museum	Howard	Elk	Southeast	Local history	information, open by appointment, old school building and barn with farm implements
Bethel College Luyken Fine Arts Center	Newton	Harvey	South Central	Art	website, includes the Robert W. Regier Gallery that features exhibits by local, regional, national and international artists, including Bethel alumni, in all types of media
Big Brutus	West Mineral	Cherokee	Southeast	Industry	160 ft (49 m). electric shovel used in coal mining and exhibits on local coal mining
Big Well Museum	Greensburg	Kiowa	South Central	History	Water well designed to provide water for the Santa Fe and Rock Island railroads
Birger Sandzén Memorial Gallery	Lindsborg	McPherson	South Central	Art	Works by Swedish-born artist Birger Sandzén
Boot Hill Museum	Dodge City	Ford	Southwest	Local history	Includes Kansas Cowboy Hall of Fame, gunfighter show, weapons, saloon, cowboys, Victorian clothing
Booth Family Hall of Athletics	Lawrence	Douglas	Northeast	Sports	website, located in the University of Kansas' Allen Fieldhouse, history and tradition of Kansas Athletics
Brown County Agriculture Museum	Hiawatha	Brown	Northeast	Agriculture	website, includes windmills, antique cars, trucks and farm equipment, miniature farm model, operated by the Brown County Historical Society
Brown County Museum	Hiawatha	Brown	Northeast	Local history	website, operated by the Brown County Historical Society
Brown Mansion	Coffeyville	Montgomery	Southeast	Historic house	website, operated by the Coffeyville Historical Society
Brown v. Board of Education National Historic Site	Topeka	Shawnee	Topeka metro	History	History of Brown v. Board of Education, which ended legal segregation in public schools
Bukovina Society Headquarters and Museum	Ellis	Ellis	Northwest	Ethnic	Collection of artifacts from Bukovina emigrants
Burns Community Museum	Burns	Marion	South Central	Local history	Open by appointment
Bushton Museum	Bushton	Rice	South Central	Local history	Includes an old drug store with a working soda fountain and an old bank
Buster Keaton Museum	Shawnee	Johnson	Northeast	Biographical	website, life of actor Buster Keaton
Butterfield Trail Historical Museum	Russell Springs	Logan	Northwest	Local history	Area pioneers, local history and natural history of the Great Plains, and the history of the Butterfield Overland Despatch stage line
C & R Railroad Museum	Phillipsburg	Phillips	Northwest	Railroad	Model railroads, C& R Railroad memorabilia and artifacts, located in the Huck Boyd Community Center
C.W. Parker Carousel Museum	Leavenworth	Leavenworth	Northeast	Amusement	Carousel memorabilia and history, includes working carousels, operated by the Leavenworth Historical Museum Association
Carnegie Arts Center	Goodland	Sherman	Northwest	Art	Located in a former Carnegie library
Carona Depot Complex	Carona	Cherokee	Southeast	Railroad	website, includes museum building, two depots, railroad locomotives and a railroad signal display, operated by Heart of the Heartlands
Carroll Mansion Museum	Leavenworth	Leavenworth	Northeast	Historic house	website, operated by the Leavenworth County Historical Society, 1890s Victorian mansion
Carry A. Nation Home and Museum	Medicine Lodge	Barber	South Central	Historic house	Included with admission to the Medicine Lodge Stockade Museum
Cassoday Historical Museum	Cassoday	Butler	South Central	Local history	
Cedar Vale Museum	Cedar Vale	Chautauqua	Southeast	Local history	
Central States Scout Museum	Larned	Pawnee	Southwest	Scouting	Boy and girl scout memorabilia
Chanute Art Gallery	Chanute	Neosho	Southeast	Art	website, community art gallery
Chanute Historical Society Museum	Chanute	Neosho	Southeast	Local history	website
Chase County Historical Society Museum	Cottonwood Falls	Chase	Southeast	Local history	website
Cherokee Strip Land Rush Museum	Arkansas City	Cowley	South Central	History	website, history of 1893 Cherokee Strip Land Run, early pioneer and Native American artifacts
Chetopa Museum	Chetopa	Labette	Southeast	Local history	
Cheyenne County Museum	St. Francis	Cheyenne	Northwest	Local history	website, operated by the Cheyenne County Historical Society, local history, fossils, wildlife
Chisholm Trail Museum	Wellington	Sumner	South Central	Local history	website, artifacts of local domestic life
Clay County Museum	Clay Center	Clay	North Central	Local history	website, operated by the Clay County Historical Society
Clearwater Historical Society Museum	Clearwater	Sedgwick		Local history	website, period rooms including a military room, summer kitchen, laundry room, school room, doctor/dentist office, and general store
Clifton Community Historical Society Museum	Clifton	Clay	North Central	Local history	Open by appointment
Cloud County Historical Museum	Concordia	Cloud	North Central	Local history	Located in a former Carnegie library
Clyde Community Museum	Clyde	Cloud	North Central	Local history	
Coffey County Historical Society Museum	Burlington	Coffey	East-Central	Local history	website, includes large collection of antique dolls
Coffeyville Aviation Heritage Museum	Coffeyville	Montgomery	Southeast	Aviation	city information, information and photos, includes memorabilia from the Coffeyville Air Base
Cole House Museum	Moundridge	McPherson	South Central	Historic house	website, pioneer family home, operated by the Moundridge Historical Association, grounds also house the Heritage Museum, Agriculture Museum and blacksmith shop
Columbian Theatre, Museum & Art Center	Wamego	Pottawatomie	Northeast	Art	Historic theater with murals, decorative arts museum and art gallery
Columbus Museum	Columbus	Cherokee	Southeast	Local history	
Comanche County Museum	Coldwater	Comanche	South Central	Local history	
Combat Air Museum	Topeka	Shawnee	Topeka metro	Aviation	Military aircraft, uniforms, medals, photos, artifacts
Constitution Hall State Historic Site	Lecompton	Douglas	Northeast	History	Exhibits on Jim Lane, proslavery and free-state forces in the area, territorial Kansas
Coronado Museum	Liberal	Seward	Southwest	Local history	website, operated by the Seward County Historical Society, exhibits include local settlers, American West, Native American's, Dorothy's House (recreation of Dorothy's house from the Wizard of Oz movie), and animated Oz entertainment and Oz memorabilia
Coronado-Quivira Museum	Lyons	Rice	South Central	Local history	http://www.cqmuseum.org/ website], operated by the Rice County Historical Society
Cosmosphere	Hutchinson	Reno	South Central	Aerospace	Exhibits of U.S. and Russian space artifacts and spacecraft, Justice Planetarium
Cottonwood Ranch State Historic Site	Studley	Sheridan	Northwest	Historic house	19th century rural ranch
Coutts Memorial Museum of Art	El Dorado	Butler	South Central	Art	website, over 1500 paintings, drawings, sculptures and prints from America, the American West, Russia, China, France, the Netherlands, England and South America
Cowley County Historical Society Museum	Winfield	Cowley	South Central	Local history	website
Crispin's Drug Store Museum	Lincoln	Lincoln	North Central	Medical	website, historical artifacts from the pharmaceutical field, with special emphasis in 1880-1920 period
Cunningham Depot Museum	Cunningham	Kingman	South Central	Local history	Located in a historic depot
Dalton Defenders Museum	Coffeyville	Montgomery	Southeast	Local history	website, includes memorabilia from the 1892 Dalton Gang raid; operated by the Coffeyville Historical Society
Dalton Gang Hideout and Museum	Meade	Meade	Southwest	History	website, 1880s period home of Eva Dalton Whipple, sister to the infamous Dalton Gang
Dane G. Hansen Museum	Logan	Phillips	Northwest	Art	website, includes paintings by Kansas artists, early American and foreign coins, European and Western guns
Deanna Rose Children's Farmstead	Overland Park	Johnson	Northeast	Open air	Includes 200 farm animals and birds of prey, gardens, Kanza Indian Encampment and earthen log lodge, a one-room country schoolhouse and a dairy barn with interactive displays
Decatur County Last Indian Raid Museum	Oberlin	Decatur	Northwest	Local history	website
Deines Cultural Center	Russell	Russell	Northwest	Art	website
Delphos Museum	Delphos	Ottawa	North Central	Local history	
Derby Historical Museum	Derby	Sedgwick	South Central	Local history	Operated by the Derby Historical Society
Dietrich Cabin	Ottawa	Franklin	East-Central	Historic house	Operated by the Franklin County Historical Society, located in Ottawa City Park, mid-19th century log cabin and pioneer museum
Dole Institute of Politics	Lawrence	Douglas	Northeast	History	Free exhibits of politics and history
Douglass Historical Museum	Douglass	Butler	South Central	Local history	website
Edna Historical Museum	Edna	Labette	Southeast	Local history	website
Edwards County Historical Society Museum	Kinsley	Edwards	South Central	Local history	website
Eisenhower Presidential Library and Museum	Abilene	Dickinson	North Central	Biographical	Presidential library, museum, and resting place of Dwight David Eisenhower, tours of his boyhood home
El Quartelejo Museum	Scott City	Scott	Southwest	Local history	website, information, operated by the Scott County Historical Society, history of Western Kansas, fossils, local Indian and pioneer history, El Quartelejo Ruins, Western art
Ellis County Historical Society Museum	Hays	Ellis	Northwest	Open air	website, includes local history museum, stone chapel, harness shop, replica Volga German Haus
Ellis Railroad Museum	Ellis	Ellis	Northwest	Railroad	website, railroad memorabilia, miniature trains and dolls
Emmett Kelly Museum	Sedan	Chautauqua	Southeast	Biographical	Life of famous circus clown Emmett Kelly, local history artifacts
Emporia State University Galleries	Emporia	Lyon	East-Central	Art	website, Norman R. Eppink and Gilson Memorial Galleries
Ennis-Handy House	Goodland	Sherman	Northwest	Historic house	Operated by the Sherman County Historical Society, 1907 Victorian period house
Ensor Park and Museum	Olathe	Johnson	Northeast	Historic house	website, information & photos, 1890s dairy farm and house
Epsten Gallery	Overland Park	Johnson	Northeast	Art	website, located in the Village Shalom continuum care facility
Erman B. White Gallery at Butler Community College	El Dorado	Butler	South Central	Art	website, located in the Fine Arts Building
Eudora Community Museum	Eudora	Douglas	Northeast	Local history	website, operated by the Eudora Area Historical Society
Evah C. Cray Historical Home Museum	Atchison	Atchison	Northeast	Historic house	website, 25 room castle-like Victorian mansion
Exploration Place	Wichita	Sedgwick	South Central	Science	
Fick Fossil Museum	Oakley	Logan	Northwest	Natural history	Fossils, folk art, Kansas Wildflower Collection, replica depot, general store display
Finney County Historical Museum	Garden City	Finney	Southwest	Local history	website, operated by the Finney County Historical Society
First City Museum	Leavenworth	Leavenworth	Northeast	Local history	website, operated by the Leavenworth Historical Museum Association
First Territorial Capitol State Historic Site	Fort Riley	Geary	Northeast	History	History of the Kansas Territory, rail and river travel in the region, and the history of Pawnee
Flint Hills Discovery Center	Manhattan	Riley	Northeast	Multiple	Natural history of the prairie, area history and culture
Fort Bissell Museum	Phillipsburg	Phillips	Northwest	Open air	website, 1870s-1880s frontier buildings, also known as Old Fort Bissell
Fort Harker	Kanopolis	Ellsworth	North Central	Military	Operated by the Ellsworth County Historical Society, mid-19th century US Army fort
Fort Hays State Historic Site	Hays	Ellis	Northwest	Military	1870s period fort
Fort Larned National Historic Site	Larned	Pawnee	Southwest	Military	Mid-19th century Indian Wars-period forts
Fort Riley Museums	Fort Riley	Geary	Northeast	Military	Includes the U.S. Cavalry Museum, 1st Infantry Division Museum and Custer Home
Fort Scott National Historic Site	Fort Scott	Bourbon	Southeast	Military	20 historic structures, a parade ground and 5 acres (20,000 m^{2}) of restored tallgrass prairie
Fort Wallace Museum	Wallace	Wallace	Northwest	Local history	website, includes exhibits of antique transportation, farm equipment and machinery, railroads, and animals and scenes made entirely out of barbwire
Fossil Station Museum	Russell	Russell	Northwest	History	website, operated by the Russell County Historical Society, period rooms and artifacts
Frank Walker Museum	Stockton	Rooks	Northwest	Local history	website, operated by the Rooks County Historical Society, large doll collection, period displays
Fromme-Birney Round Barn	Mullinville	Kiowa	South Central	Agriculture	Operated by the Kiowa County Historical Society, 16-sided barn with exhibits on barns and agriculture
Frontier Army Museum	Fort Leavenworth	Leavenworth	Northeast	Military	website, history of the Frontier Army from 1804 to 1916, and Fort Leavenworth from 1827 to the present
Galena Mining and Historical Museum	Galena	Cherokee	Southeast	Mining	Includes mineral specimens, mining equipment and a model of the Grand Central Mine
Galva Museum	Galva	McPherson	South Central	Local history	
Garden of Eden	Lucas	Russell	Northwest	Art	Concrete sculpture garden and home
Gardner Historical Museum	Gardner	Johnson	Northeast	History	website, preservation and exhibition of the history of reverse mortgages
Geary County Museum & Historical Society	Junction City	Geary	Northeast	Local history	website
Geneseo City History Museum	Geneseo	Rice	South Central	Local history	
Gernon House	Russell	Russell	Northwest	Historic house	website, operated by the Russell County Historical Society, 1870s house and blacksmith shop
Goodnow House State Historic Site	Manhattan	Riley	Northeast	Historic house	Mid-19th century stone farmhouse
Graham County Historical Society Museum	Hill City	Graham	Northwest	Local history	website
Grant County Adobe Museum	Ulysses	Grant	Southwest	Local history	website, housed in a 1938 adobe building
Grassroots Art Center	Lucas	Russell	Northwest	Art	website, outsider art and sculpture
Great Overland Station	Topeka	Shawnee	Topeka metro	Railroad	Former railroad station, includes railroad artifacts and photographs, local history displays, Harvey House and Harvey Girls exhibit, model train layout
Great Plains Nature Center	Wichita	Sedgwick	South Central	Natural history	website, exhibits about state ecosystems, wildlife, located in 282-acre Chisholm Creek Park
Great Plains Transportation Museum	Wichita	Sedgwick	South Central	Railway	Includes 6 locomotives and several pieces of rolling stock
Greenwood County Historical Society Museum	Eureka	Greenwood	Southeast	Local history	website
Grenola Elevator Museum	Grenola	Elk	Southeast	Local history	website, operated by the Grenola Historical Society in a former grain mill and elevator
Greyhound Hall of Fame	Abilene	Dickinson	North Central	Hall of fame	website, displays of greyhounds from ancient times to the present
Grinter Place State Historic Site	Kansas City	Wyandotte	Northeast	Historic house	Pioneer farm house
Gunfighters Wax Museum	Dodge City	Ford	Southwest	Wax	website, wax figures of famous Old West people, located inside the Kansas Teachers' Hall of Fame
Halstead Heritage Museum & Depot	Halstead	Harvey	South Central	Local history	website, operated by the Halstead Historical Society
Hamilton County Museum	Syracuse	Hamilton	Southwest	Local history	website, period displays
Harold M. Freund American Museum of Baking	Manhattan	Riley	Northeast	Food	Baking figurines, equipment, memorabilia, part of the American Institute of Baking
Harvey County Historical Museum	Newton	Harvey	South Central	Local history	Operated by the Harvey County Historical Society in a former Carnegie library, also the 1883 Kellas School
Harvey House Museum	Florence	Marion	South Central	Local history	Operated by the Florence Historical Society in a former Harvey House hotel
Haskell County Museum	Sublette	Haskell	Southwest	Local history	website
Haskell Cultural Center and Museum	Lawrence	Douglas	Northeast	Native American	website, part of Haskell Indian Nations University, history and culture of the state's Native Americans, military service, history of the University
Haun Museum	Jetmore	Hodgeman	Southwest	Local history	
Herington Historical Museum	Herington	Dickinson	North Central	Local history	Facebook site, operated by the Herington Historical Society
Heritage Center of Dickinson County	Abilene	Dickinson	North Central	Open air	website, includes Historical Museum, Museum of Independent Telephony, a cabin, a grocery store built in 1932 and a C.W. Parker Carousel
Heym-Oliver House	Russell	Russell	Northwest	Historic house	website, operated by the Russell County Historical Society, 1870s house
High Plains Museum	Goodland	Sherman	Northwest	Local history	website, includes a full-sized, automated replica of America's first patented helicopter
Highbanks Hall of Fame National Midget Auto Racing Museum	Belleville	Republic	North Central	Automotive	website
Historical Museum of Anthony	Anthony	Harper	South Central	Local history	Located in a Santa Fe Railroad Depot
Hoisington Historical Museum	Hoisington	Barton	South Central	Local history	website, operated by the Hoisington Historical Society
Hollenberg Pony Express Station State Historic Site	Hanover	Washington	Northeast	History	Building used as a stop for the Pony Express
Holt-Russell Gallery at Baker University	Baldwin City	Douglas	Northeast	Art	website, located in Parmenter Hall, features art by students, faculty and local, national and international artists
Horace Greeley Museum, formerly the Greeley County Historical Society Museum	Tribune	Greeley			website
Humboldt Historical Museum	Humboldt	Allen	Southeast	Open air	website, five buildings with exhibits including iron toys, tools and farm implements, local history displays
Independence Historical Museum and Art Center	Independence	Montgomery	Southeast	Local history	website, home of Montgomery County Historical Society, early settler' lifestyle, oil industry history, Native American culture, local historical artifacts, period room displays, furnishings and decorative items, art center, Kansas Celebrity Hall of Fame
Indian Pay Station & Museum Complex	St. Marys	Pottawatomie	Northeast	Local history	
Inman Museum	Inman	McPherson	South Central	Open air	website, includes the museum, 1906 telephone office, depot, caboose, 1875 Wilke homestead house; formerly the McCormick - Deering Days Museum
Iron Horse Museum	Parsons	Labette	Southeast	Railroad	Operated by the Ironhorse Historical Society, includes railroad memorabilia, a locomotive and caboose
Jackson County Historical Society Museum	Holton	Jackson	Topeka metro	Local history	website
Jeffcoat Photograph Studio Museum	Abilene	Dickinson	North Central	History	website, historic photographs of Abilene and Dickinson County
Jewell County Historical Society Museum	Mankato	Jewell	North Central	Local history	website
John Brown Museum State Historic Site	Osawatomie	Miami	East-Central	History	Abolition and Civil war displays and furnishings
Johnson County Museum of History	Shawnee	Johnson	Northeast	Local history	website, County history and culture
Johnston Geology Museum	Emporia	Lyon	East-Central	Geology	website, also known as ESU Geology Museum, in ESU Cram Science Hall of Emporia State University
Kansas African American Museum	Wichita	Sedgwick	South Central	African American	website
Kansas Auto Racing Museum	Chapman	Dickinson	North Central	Automotive	website
Kansas Aviation Museum	Wichita	Sedgwick	South Central	Aviation	
Kansas Barbed Wire Museum	La Crosse	Rush	South Central	Commodity	Barbed wire and its history
Kansas Children's Discovery Center	Topeka	Shawnee	Topeka metro	Children's	
Kansas Cowboy Hall of Fame	Dodge City	Ford	Southwest	Hall of fame	Part of Boot Hill Museum
Kansas Firefighters Museum	Wichita	Sedgwick	South Central	Firefighting	website
Kansas Learning Center for Health	Halstead	Harvey	South Central	Medical	website, human body and health displays for children and families
Kansas Motorcycle Museum	Marquette	McPherson	South Central	Transportation	Vintage and rare motorcycles, memorabilia and artifacts
Kansas Museum of History	Topeka	Shawnee	Topeka metro	History	Operated by the Kansas Historical Society
Kansas Museum of Military History	Augusta	Butler	South Central	Military	Includes model airplanes, military vehicles, uniforms, equipment, memorabilia; formerly the Augusta Air Museum
Kansas Oil and Gas Hall of Fame & Museum	Great Bend	Barton	South Central	Industry	Open by appointment
Kansas Oil Museum	El Dorado	Butler	South Central	Industry	website, oil industry, farming, ranching exhibits, oil boom town complex and oil equipment; also known as Butler County History Center
Kansas Soldiers' Home	Fort Dodge	Ford	Southwest	History	Tours of 19th-century former fort buildings
Kansas Sports Hall of Fame	Wichita	Sedgwick	South Central	Sports	History of sports in Kansas
Kansas State Capitol	Topeka	Shawnee	Topeka metro	History	Tours operated by the Kansas State Historical Society
Kansas State University Historic Costume and Textile Museum	Manhattan	Riley	Northeast	Textile	website, located in Justin Hall
Kansas State University Insect Zoo	Manhattan	Riley	Northeast	Natural history	website, housed in the old Dairy Barn
Kansas Teachers' Hall of Fame	Dodge City	Ford	Southwest	Education	website, photos and stories about Kansas' notable teaching professionals
Kauffman Museum	North Newton	Harvey	South Central	History	website, affiliated with Bethel College, exhibits on prairie life and natural history, area immigrant pioneers, historic farmstead house and prairie reconstruction
Kaw Mission State Historic Site	Council Grove	Morris	Southeast	Native American	Early mission for children of the Kaw tribe
Kearny County Historical Museum	Lakin	Kearny	Southwest	Open air	website, complex includes museum building and annex, the White House, the schoolhouse, depot and a metal building to house farm equipment
Keystone Gallery	Oakley	Logan	Northwest	Natural history	website, art gallery and fossil museum
Kingman County Historical Museum	Kingman	Kingman	South Central	Local history	website, operated by the Kingman County Historical Society
Kiowa County Historical Museum & Soda Fountain	Greensburg	Kiowa	South Central	Local history	website, located in the Kiowa County Commons Building, operated by the Kiowa County Historical Society, features a soda fountain display
Koester House Museum	Marysville	Marshall	Northeast	Historic house	website, 1876 house decorated with items all belonging to the members of the family that lived there, operated by the Marshall County Historical Society
La Cygne Historical Society Museum	La Cygne	Linn	East-Central	Local history	website
Lane County Historical Museum	Dighton	Lane	Southwest	Local history	website, operated by the Lane County Historical Society
Lane University & Territorial Capital Museum	Lecompton	Douglas	Northeast	History	Kansas history before the Civil War
Lanesfield School Historic Site	Edgerton	Johnson	Northeast	Education	website, history of rural education in Kansas and Johnson County
Lansing Historical Museum	Lansing	Leavenworth	Northeast	Local history	website, local and railroad history, history of the Lansing Correctional Facility
Lawrence Arts Center	Lawrence	Douglas	Northeast	Art	Visual and performing arts center
Legler Barn Museum	Lenexa	Johnson	Northeast	Local history	website, operated by the Lenexa Historical Society, complex includes the Legler stone barn with local history exhibits and Lenexa historic depot with local transportation exhibits
Lincoln County, Kansas, Historical Museum	Lincoln	Lincoln	North Central	Open air	website, operated by the Lincoln County Historical Society, includes Kyne House Museum, a one-room school and early businesses, such as a newspaper office, funeral home, general store
Lindsborg Old Mill & Swedish Heritage Museum	Lindsborg	McPherson	South Central	Local history, Open Air	website, Includes 1898 Smoky Valley Roller Mills, 1904 World's Fair Swedish Pavilion and other buildings with local history exhibits
Linn County Museum	Pleasanton	Linn	East-Central	Local history	Operated by the Linn County Historical Society
Little House on the Prairie Museum	Independence	Montgomery		Reconstructed cabin on site of one of Laura Ingalls Wilder's homestead	website
Logan Area Historical Museum	Logan	Phillips	Northwest	Local history	Operated by the Logan Area Historical Society
Lowell D. Holmes Museum of Anthropology	Wichita	Sedgwick	South Central	Anthropology	Part of Wichita State University, cultural items from around the world and archaeological objects predominantly from the American Midwest and Southwest
Lowell Milken Center for Unsung Heroes	Fort Scott	Bourbon	Southeast	Unsung Hero History	Showcasing Unsung Heroes discovered by students grade 6-12 - Website: https://www.lowellmilkencenter.org
Lyon County History Center	Emporia	Lyon	East-Central	Local history	website
Mahaffie Stagecoach Stop and Farm Historic Site	Olathe	Johnson	Northeast	Historic house	Mid-19th century stage coach stop and farm
Major General Frederick Funston Home	Iola	Allen	Southeast	Biographical	website, operated by the Allen County Historical Society, Victorian home of Frederick Funston
Marianna Kistler Beach Museum of Art	Manhattan	Riley	Northeast	Art	Part of Kansas State University, emphasizes the art of Kansas and the surrounding region
Marion City Museum	Marion	Marion	South Central	Local history	website
Marshall County Courthouse Museum	Marysville	Marshall	Northeast	Local history	website, operated by the Marshall County Historical Society
Martin and Osa Johnson Safari Museum	Chanute	Neosho	Southeast	Biographical	Life and travels of adventurers Martin and Osa Johnson
Marysville Doll Museum	Marysville	Marshall	Northeast	Doll	
McPherson Museum	McPherson	McPherson	South Central	Local history	History and cultural heritage of the McPherson community, geology, paleontology, pioneer history, fine art, Native American history
Meade County Historical Museum	Meade	Meade	Southwest	Local history	website, operated by the Meade County Historical Society
Medicine Lodge Stockade Museum	Medicine Lodge	Barber	South Central	History	website, includes reproduction frontier fort, museum, Smith Log Cabin, Old Courthouse Jail, admission to the Carrie Nation House
Mem-Erie Museum	Erie	Neosho	Southeast	Local history	Operated by the Neosho County Historical Society
Mennonite Heritage and Agricultural Museum	Goessel	Marion	South Central	Open air	website, late 19th century Russian Mennonite pioneer buildings and history, artifacts about the progression of mechanization in farming from the 1800s to the mid-1960s
Mennonite Settlement Museum	Hillsboro	Marion	South Central	Historic house	website, includes 1876 Peter Paul Loewen House (a Russian Mennonite clay brick house), and reproduction 1876 Friesen Dutch Windmill
Miami County Historical Museum	Paola	Miami	East-Central	Local history	website, also known as Swan River Museum, housed in three 19th-century buildings
Mid-America Air Museum	Liberal	Seward	Southwest	Aviation	Features over 100 aircraft
Mid-America All-Indian Center	Wichita	Sedgwick	South Central	Native American	Art and culture of American Indians of the United States
Mine Creek Battlefield State Historic Site	Pleasanton	Linn	East-Central	Military	Civil War exhibits
Miners Hall Museum	Franklin	Crawford	Southeast	Mining	website, area coal mining, located within the Franklin Community Center & Heritage Museum
Mitchell County Museum	Beloit	Mitchell	North Central	Local history	Facebook site, operated by the Mitchell County Historical Society
Morton County Historical Society Museum	Elkhart	Morton	Southwest	Local history	website, exhibits on pioneer life on the Santa Fe Trail
Moss-Thorns Gallery of Art	Hays	Ellis	Northwest	Art	website, part of Fort Hays State University in Rarick Hall
Mound City Historic Park	Mound City	Linn	East-Central	Open air	website, operated by the Mound City Historical Society, includes school, depot, barn, windmill, log cabin, historic house
Mound Valley Historical Museum	Mound Valley	Labette	Southeast	Local history	
Moundridge Depot Museum	Moundridge	McPherson	South Central	Railroad	website, restored 1880s depot, open by appointment, operated by the Moundridge Historical Association
Mueller-Schmidt House Museum	Dodge City	Ford	Southwest	Historic house	Operated by the Ford County Historical Society, 1880s house
Mulvane Art Museum	Topeka	Shawnee	Topeka metro	Art	website, part of Washburn University, collection features 4,000 pieces of fine art including paintings, prints, sculptures and decorative art
Mulvane Historical Museum	Mulvane	Sedgwick	South Central	Local history	website, operated by the Mulvane Historical Society in a historic Santa Fe Railroad depot
Museum at Prairiefire	Overland Park	Johnson	Northeast	Natural history	Natural history of Kansas, included dinosaurs, traveling exhibitions from the American Museum of Natural History
Museum of Crawford County	Girard	Crawford	Southeast	Local history	
Museum of Deaf History, Arts and Culture	Olathe	Johnson	Northeast	Art, history and culture	History of the Kansas State School For the Deaf and Deaf culture
Museum of the Great Plains	Leoti	Wichita	Southwest	Local history	website, operated by the Wichita County Historical Society
Museum of the Kansas National Guard	Topeka	Shawnee	Topeka metro	Military	website, history of the Kansas National Guard
Museum of World Treasures	Wichita	Sedgwick	South Central	Multiple	Includes exhibits on fossils, ancient Egypt, American military history, American Presidents and European royalty, frontier and Old West history and more
National Agricultural Center and Hall of Fame	Bonner Springs	Wyandotte	Northeast	Agriculture	Includes museum of farming, gallery with rural art and artifacts, National Poultry Museum, 1890s period house, recreated rural village
National Fred Harvey Museum	Leavenworth	Leavenworth	Northeast	Historic house	website, planned museum, operated by the Leavenworth Historical Museum Association
National Glass Museum	Wellington	Sumner	South Central	Glass	website, museum of American-made glass with an emphasis on the Depression era, operated by the National Depression Glass Association
National Orphan Train Complex	Concordia	Cloud	North Central	History	Story of the Orphan Train Movement from 1854-1929
Nehama County Historical Museum	Seneca	Nemaha	Northeast	Local history	website, operated by the Nehama County Historical Society, housed in a former jail and sheriff's residence, also nearby Masonic building with military exhibits
Nerman Museum of Contemporary Art	Overland Park	Johnson	Northeast	Art	Part of Johnson County Community College, features works of international, national and regional artists
Ness County Historical Museum	Ness City	Ness	Southwest	Local history	Includes the museum, Oil and Agriculture Museum, Ness City's first schoolhouse and local artifacts
Nicodemus National Historic Site	Nicodemus	Grant	Southwest	African American	Only remaining western town established by African Americans during the Reconstruction Period following the American Civil War
Norton County Historical Museum	Norton	Norton	Northwest	Local history	Operated by the Norton County Historical Society
Oil Patch Museum	Russell	Russell	Northwest	Industry	website, operated by the Russell County Historical Society, local oil discovery and production
Old Castle Museum	Baldwin City	Douglas	Northeast	Local history	Part of Baker University, artifacts from early Kansas, Methodist, and Baker history, Kibbee cabin
Old Cowtown Museum	Wichita	Sedgwick	South Central	Living	1870s mid-western cattle town
Old Depot Museum	Ottawa	Franklin	East-Central	Local history	Operated by the Franklin County Historical Society, history of local Native Americans, local industries, railroads, recreations of historical rooms
Old Prairie Town at Ward-Meade Historic Site	Topeka	Shawnee	Topeka metro	Open air	Complex with a Victorian home, log cabin, turn-of-the-20th-century town and a 2.5-acre (10,000 m^{2}) botanical garden
Osage County Museum	Lyndon	Osage	Topeka metro	Local history	website, operated by the Osage County Historical Society
Osawatomie History Museum	Osawatomie	Miami	East-Central	Local history	website
Osborne County Historical Museum	Osborne	Osborne	Northwest	Local history	Local artifacts and a school
Oswego Historical Museum	Oswego	Labette	Southeast	Local history	website, period displays, log cabin nearby, operated by the Oswego Historical Society
Ottawa County Historical Museum	Minneapolis	Ottawa	North Central	Local history	website
Oz Museum	Wamego	Pottawatomie	Northeast	Media	website, Oz memorabilia
Palmer Museum	Jewell	Jewell	North Central	Local history	Oen by appointment, history of the community and small-town newspapers, features historic printing equipment
Paradise Doll Hospital & Museum	Towanda	Butler	South Central	Doll	
Parker Museum	Parker	Linn	East-Central	Local history	website, operated by the Parker Community Historical Society
Parsons Historical Museum	Parsons	Labette	Southeast	Local history	website, operated by the Parsons Historical Society
Paul Boyer Museum of Animated Carvings	Belleville	Republic	North Central	Art	Animated folk art carvings
Pawnee Indian Museum State Historic Site	Republic	Republic	North Central	Native American	Archaeological remains and exhibits of an 1820s Pawnee village
Peabody Historical Library Museum	Peabody	Marion	South Central	Local history	Operated by the Peabody Historical Society
Peabody Printing Museum	Peabody	Marion	South Central	Technology	Collection of hot type equipment dating from 1870–1920
Pioneer-Krier Museum	Ashland	Clark	Southwest	Local history	website, operated by the Clark County Historical Society
Pony Express Barn	Marysville	Marshall	Northeast	Transportation	website, operated by the Marshall County Historical Society, barn used as Home Station No. 1 on the Pony Express route
Pony Express Museum	Seneca	Nemaha	Northeast	Local history	Includes saloon, blacksmith shop, schoolroom, stables, kitchen with many items from the historic Smith Hotel, a parlor and bedroom typical of the hotel
Post Rock Scout Museum	Lincoln	Lincoln	North Central	Scouting	website, historical artifacts of scouting organizations, open by appointment
Prairie Museum of Art and History	Colby	Thomas	Northwest	Multiple	website, operated by the Thomas County Historical Society, collections of toys & dolls, glass, ceramics, clothing, furnishings; barn with agriculture machinery & displays, sod house, church, 1930s farmstead, one room school
Pratt County Historical Museum	Pratt	Pratt	South Central	Local history	website
Quayle Bible Collection	Baldwin City	Douglas	Northeast	Literary	website, part of Baker University in the Collins Library
Rawlins County Museum	Atwood	Rawlins	Northwest	Local history	Operated by the Rawlins County Historical Society, includes re-creations of a beauty parlor, post office, doctor's office, dentist's office and a school room
Red Barn Studio Museum	Lindsborg	McPherson	South Central	Art	website, working studio of professional artist and craftsman Lester Raymer (1907-1991), operated by the Raymer Society for the Arts
Reno County Museum	Hutchinson	Reno	South Central	Local history	website
Republic County Historical Society Museum	Belleville	Republic	North Central	Local history	website
Richmond Community Museum	Richmond	Franklin	East-Central Kansas	Local history	Facebook site
Riley County Historical Museum	Manhattan	Riley	Northeast	Local history	website, operated by the Riley County Historical Society, includes the Hartford House
Rock Creek Valley Historical Society Museum	Westmoreland	Pottawatomie	Northeast	Open air	website, includes main museum, a two-story log cabin, historic stone church, an annex for large machinery and equipment
Roebke Memorial Museum	Holton	Jackson	Topeka metro	Local history	website, operated by the Jackson County Historical Society, 1876 house with local history and cultural displays
Roniger Memorial Museum	Cottonwood Falls	Chase	Southeast	Native American	Native American artifacts and local history items
Rush County Historical Society	LaCrosse	Rush	South Central	Multiple	website, complex includes Post Rock Museum with displays of pioneer history, Rush County Historical Museum in a former depot, and Nekoma Bank Museum with bank displays
Salina Art Center	Salina	Saline	North Central	Art	website
Salter House Museum	Argonia	Sumner	South Central	Historic house	Open by appointment by the Argonia and Western Sumner County Historical Society, 1880s period house
Santa Fe Trail Center	Larned	Pawnee	Southwest	Open air	website, local history and history of the Santa Fe Trail
Santa Fe Trail Museum	Ingalls	Gray	Southwest	Local history	
Scandia Museum	Scandia	Republic	North Central	Local history	information
Schmidt Museum of Natural History	Emporia	Lyon	East-Central	Natural history	website, part of Emporia State University
Schuyler Museum	Burlingame	Osage	Topeka metro	Local history	information, operated by the Burlingame Historical Preservation Society in the former Schuyler Grade School
Seelye Mansion	Abilene	Dickinson	North Central	Historic house	website, 1905 25-room mansion, includes Patent Medicine Museum
Shafer Gallery	Great Bend	Barton	South Central	Art	website, officially known as the L. E. "Gus" and Eva Shafer Memorial Art Gallery, part of Barton Community College
Shaffer House Museum and Art Center	Moline	Elk	Southeast	Local history	
Shawnee Indian Mission State Historic Site	Fairway	Johnson	Northeast	History	Mission history and period rooms
Shawnee Town	Shawnee	Johnson	Northeast	Open air	website, small town rural life from the 1920s
Sheridan County Historical Society & Mickey's Museum	Hoxie	Sheridan	Northwest	Local history	https://www.facebook.com/SCHSMMKS/ Facebook site]
Smoky Hill Museum	Salina	Saline	North Central	Local history	website
Souders Historical Museum	Cheney	Sedgwick		Open air	Open by appointment, late 1880s and early 20th century small town buildings
Spencer Museum of Art	Lawrence	Douglas	Northeast	Art	Part of University of Kansas
Stafford County Museum	Stafford	Strafford	South Central	Local history	website, operated by the Stafford County Historical & Genealogical Society
Stanton County Museum	Johnson	Stanton	Southwest	Open air	Facebook site, includes train depot, jail, caboose, grain elevator, general store, 1935 WPA building, historic houses
Stauth Memorial Museum	Montezuma	Gray	Southwest	Cultural	website, handicrafts and arts from around the world, displays about history, art, science
Sternberg Museum of Natural History	Hays	Ellis	Northwest	Natural history	Part of Fort Hays State University, includes dinosaurs, fossils, prehistoric animals, giant sea-swimming lizards and fish
Stevens County Gas & Historical Museum	Hugoton	Stevens	Southwest	Open air	website, complex includes museum of local history artifacts, train depot, 1887 school house, 1887 home, grocery store and barber shop, jail, 1905 church, Professional Building with tribute to Hugoton's past judges and lawyers and the Agricultural Building with displays of farm equipment & implements
Strang Carriage House	Overland Park	Johnson	Northeast	Local history	Serves as home to the Overland Park Historical Society and showcases a collection of items from the early history of Overland Park and the surrounding area.
Strataca	Hutchinson	Reno	South Central	Mining	Underground rock salt mine and museum, also known as Kansas Underground Salt Museum
Strawberry Hill Museum and Cultural Center	Kansas City	Wyandotte	Northwest	Cultural	website, permanent exhibits for the countries of Croatia, the Ukraine, Lithuania, the Netherlands, Poland, Slovakia, Slovenia and Russia
They Also Ran Gallery	Norton	Norton	Northwest	History	website, photographs and information about defeated candidates for the U.S. Presidency
Tonganoxie Community Historical Society and Museum	Tonganoxie	Leavenworth		Open air	website includes the museum of local history housed in the milk parlor, the Fairchild/Knox Dairy barn, Honey Valley School, Reno Methodist Church and fire house
Topeka & Shawnee County Public Library	Topeka	Shawnee	Topeka metro	Art	Includes the Alice C. Sabatini Gallery
Topeka Computing Museum	Topeka	Shawnee	Topeka metro	Technology	website, displays of historic personal computers and electronic game systems
Towanda Area Historical Museum	Towanda	Butler	South Central	Local history	Operated by the Towanda Historical Society
Trading Post Museum	Pleasanton	Linn	East-Central	Local history	
Trail Days Historic Site	Council Grove	Morris	Northeast	Art, history and Culture	A complex of buildings composed of an 1861 Rawlinson-Terwilliger Stone Home, Trail Days Arts & History Center, 1858 log house inside a barn, 1902 Field School House, 1942 World War II Cabin, and 1930 Motor Camp Cabin.
Trego County Museum	WaKeeney	Trego	Northwest	Local history	website, operated by the Trego County Historical Society
Ulrich Museum of Art	Wichita	Sedgwick	South Central	Art	website, part of Wichita State University, modern and contemporary art, features 76-piece Martin H. Bush Outdoor Sculpture Collection
University of Kansas Natural History Museum	Lawrence	Douglas	Northeast	Natural history	Part of University of Kansas, also known as Dyche Museum of Natural History
Valley Center Historical Museum	Valley Center	Sedgwick	South Central	Local history	website, operated by the Valley Center Historical and Cultural Society
Valley Falls Historical Society Museum	Valley Falls	Jefferson	Topeka metro	Local history	website
W.H. Morgan House	Peabody	Marion	South Central	Historic house	1881 two-story cottage, operated by the Peabody Historical Society
Wabaunsee County Historical Museum	Alma	Wabaunsee	Topeka metro	History	website, operated by the Wabaunsee County Historical Society
Wakefield Museum	Wakefield	Clay	North Central	Local history	website
Waller-Coolbaugh 20th Century House	Stockton	Rooks	Northwest	Historic house	1905 High Classical Revival residence
Walter P. Chrysler Boyhood Home & Museum	Ellis	Ellis	Northwest	Biographical	website, information
Wamego Historical Museum	Wamego	Pottawatomie	Northeast	Open air	website, includes Old Dutch Mill and museum complex with a local history museum, prairie town village including a one-room school house, rock jail and log cabin; operated by the Wamego Historical Society
Warkentin House	Newton	Harvey	South Central	Historic house	1880s Victorian mansion
Washington-Ames House	Leoti	Wichita	Southwest	Local history	website, operated by the Wichita County Historical Society
Washington County Museum	Washington	Washington	Northeast	Local history	Operated by the Washington County Historical & Genealogical Society
Watkins Community Museum of History	Lawrence	Douglas	Northeast	Local history	website, operated by the Douglas County Historical Society
Wichita Art Museum	Wichita	Sedgwick	South Central	Art	Works by American painters, potters, sculptors and textile weavers
Wichita-Sedgwick County Historical Museum	Wichita	Sedgwick	South Central	Local history	
Wilcox Classical Museum	Lawrence	Douglas	Northeast	Art	website, part of University of Kansas, plaster casts of Greek and Roman Sculpture and Greek and Roman antiquities
William Allen White House State Historic Site	Emporia	Lyon	East-Central	Biographical	Home of newspaperman and author William Allen White, also known as Red Rocks State Historic Site
William F. Schaeffler House	Hillsboro	Marion	South Central	Historic house	website, early 20th century Edwardian home
Wilson County Historical Museum	Fredonia	Wilson	Southeast	Local history	Operated by the Wilson County Historical Society
Wilson Czech Opera House & Museum	Wilson	Ellsworth	North Central	Local history	Czech immigrant heritage artifacts
Wolf House	Manhattan	Riley	Northeast	Local history	website, operated by the Riley County Historical Society, 1880s period home
Wonderscope	Shawnee	Johnson	Northeast	Children's	website
Woodson County Historical Museum	Yates Center	Woodson	Southeast	Local history	
World War II History Center	El Dorado	Butler	South Central	History	website, includes information about the entire war on the European, Pacific and Home Fronts
Wyandotte County Historical Museum	Bonner Springs	Wyandotte	Northeast	Local history	website, information and photos
Yesterday House Museum	Sylvan Grove	Lincoln	North Central	Local history	website, operated by the Sylvan Grove Historical Society
Yesteryear Museum	Salina	Saline	North Central	Agriculture	website, agriculture, cultural displays depicting early rural life in 1900s, also known as Central Kansas Flywheels Museum
Yost Art Gallery	Highland	Doniphan	Northeast	Art	website, part of Highland Community College

== Defunct museums ==
- Abilene Fashion Museum
- Crawford County Historical Museum, Pittsburg, closed in 2015
- Lebold Mansion, Abilene, a private house as of 2010
- Museum of the Antique Fan Collectors Association, collection of electric fans, moving from Andover, Kansas to Zionsville, Indiana, website
- Norman No. 1 Oil Well Museum, Neodesha
- Scotty's Classic Car Museum, Arma, website, closed and for sale as of 3/3/2016
- Ted's Old Iron Farm and Museum, Columbus, closed in 2014 after owner's death

== See also ==
- Botanical gardens in Kansas (category)
- List of historical societies in Kansas
- List of museums in the United States
- Nature Centers in Kansas

== Resources ==
- Travel Kansas
- Kansas Heritage Tours
- Kansas Travel - descriptions & photos of museums and sights in Kansas
- Kansas Museums Association
