= Museum of the Great Plains =

Museum of the Great Plains or Great Plains Museum may refer to:

- Museum of the Great Plains (Oklahoma), in Lawton, Oklahoma
- Museum of the Great Plains (Wichita County, Kansas), in Leoti, Kansas, in the National Register-listed Municipal Auditorium and City Hall
- Great Plains Black History Museum, North Omaha, Nebraska
- Great Plains Art Museum, at the Center for Great Plains Studies at the University of Nebraska–Lincoln
- Great Plains Transportation Museum, Wichita, Kansas
- Great Plains Dinosaur Museum and Field Station, Malta, Montana
- former Delbridge Museum of Natural History, Sioux Falls, South Dakota

== See also ==
- Plains Art Museum, Fargo, North Dakota
- Southern Plains Indian Museum, Anadarko, Oklahoma
- Laramie Plains Museum, Laramie, Wyoming
- Great Plains section of the Hungarian Open Air Museum, Szentendre, Hungary
