= List of historical societies in Kansas =

The following is a list of historical societies in the state of Kansas, United States.

== Organizations ==
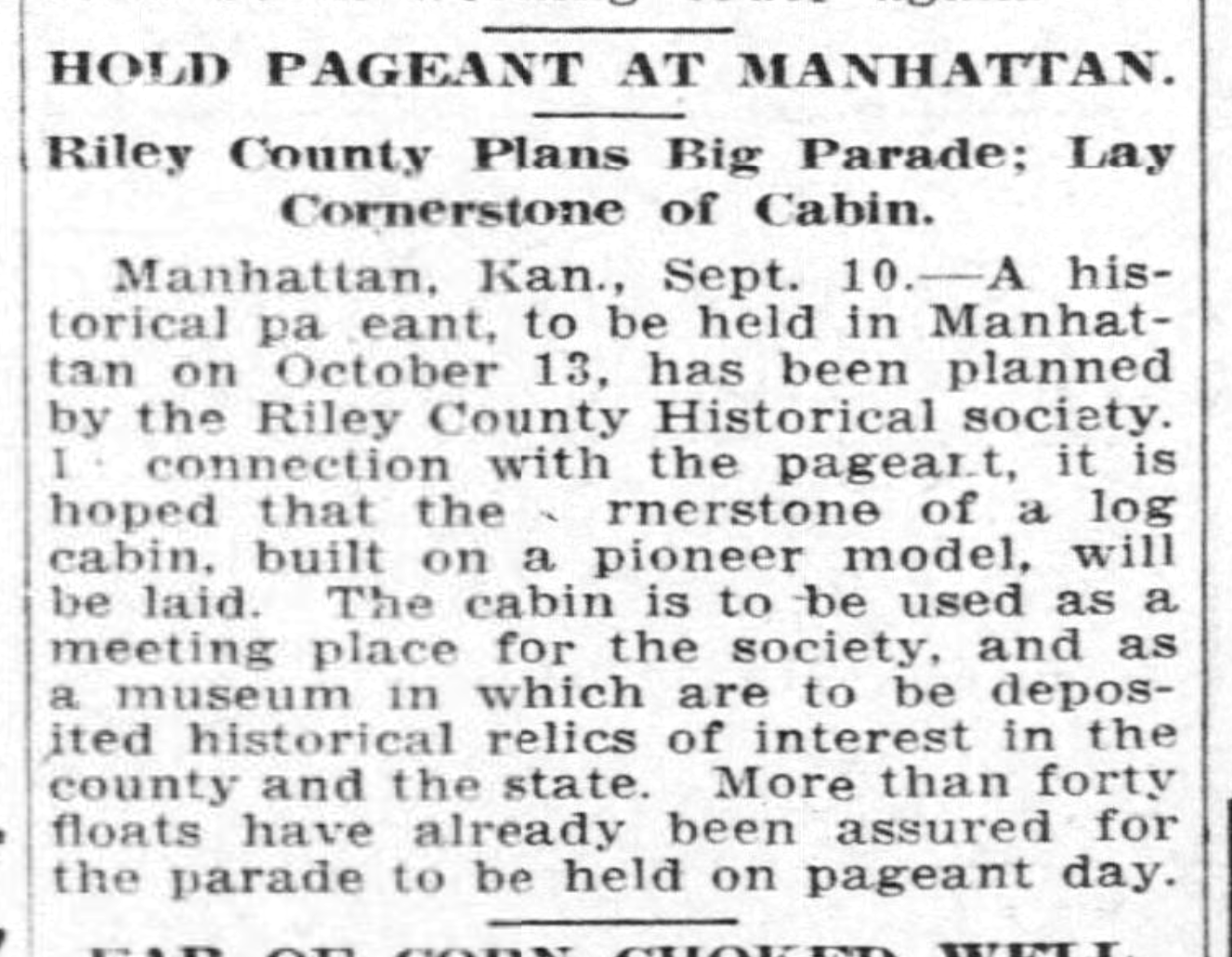
1915 newspaper item about plans for an "historical pageant" organized by the Riley County Historical Society, Kansas

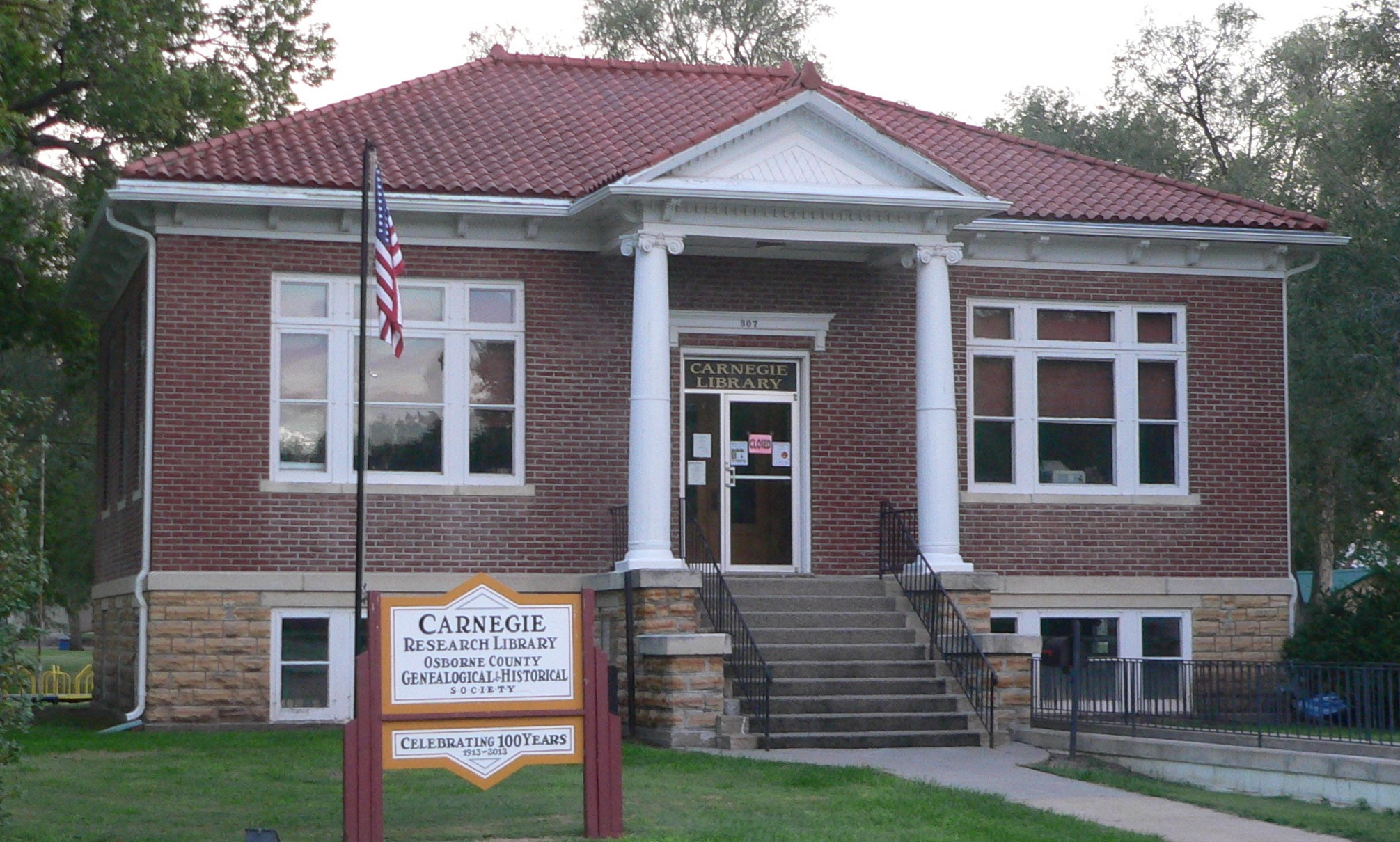
Research library building of the Osborne County Genealogical and Historical Society in Osborne, Kansas (photo 2014)

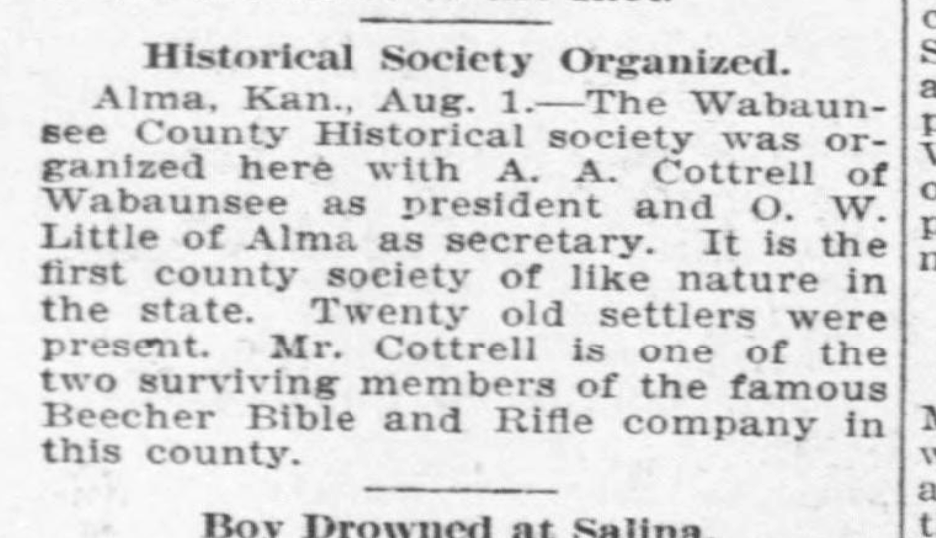
1904 newspaper item about the establishment of the Wabaunsee County Historical Society, Kansas

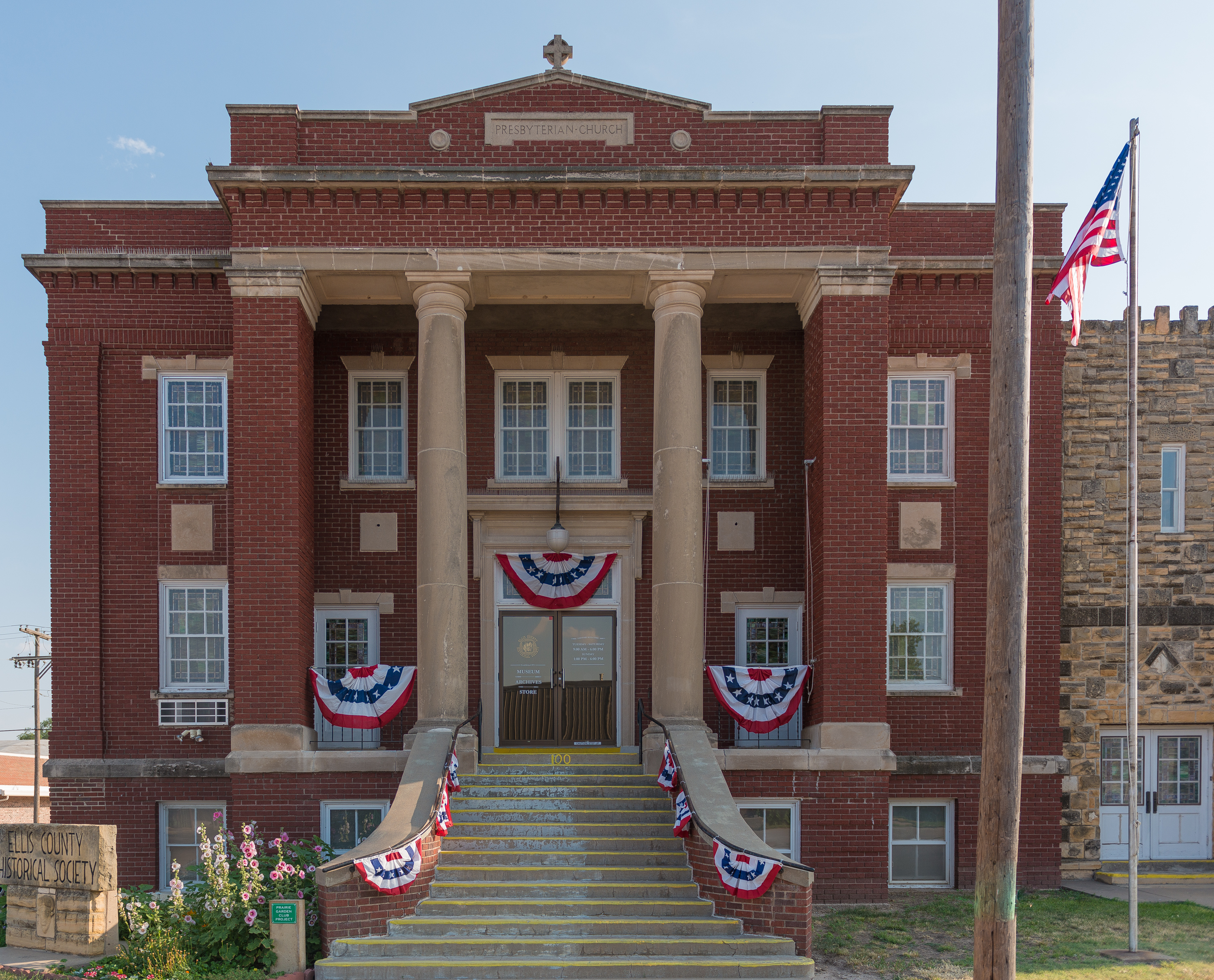
Ellis County Historical Society building in Kansas (photo 2013)

- Atchison County Historical Society
- Caney Valley Historical Society
- Clay County Historical Society
- Clearwater Historical Society
- Clinton Lake Historical Society
- Coffey County Historical Society
- Cowley County Historical Society
- Derby Historical Society
- Dickinson County Historical Society
- Douglas County Historical Society
- Ellis County Historical Society
- Ellsworth County Historical Society
- F Remington Area Historic Society
- Finney County Historical Society
- Franklin County Historical Society
- Hamilton County Historical Society
- Harvey County Historical Society
- Herington Historical Society & Museum
- Hillsboro Historical Society
- Kansas Historical Society
- Kearny County Historical Society
- Kiowa County Historical Society
- Labette County Historical Society
- Leavenworth County Historical Society
- Lenexa Historical Society
- Ma-Hush-Kah Historical Society
- Marquette Historical Society
- McPherson County Historical Society
- Meade County Historical Society
- Mem-Erie Historical Society
- Nemaha County Historical Society
- Neosho County Historical Society
- Nicodemus Historical Society
- Northeast Kansas Historical Society
- Osage County Historical Society
- Osborne County Genealogical and Historical Society
- Overland Park Historical Society
- Republic County Historical Society
- Riley County Historical Society
- Rush County Historical Society
- Santa Fe Trail Historical Society
- Scott County Historical Society
- Shawnee County Historical Society
- Sherman County Historical Society
- Thomas County Historical Society
- Tonganoxie Community Historical Society
- Trego County Historical Society
- Wabaunsee County Historical Society
- Wyandotte County Historical Society

== See also ==
- History of Kansas
- List of museums in Kansas
- National Register of Historic Places listings in Kansas
- List of historical societies in the United States
