= Municipal Auditorium and City Hall (Leoti, Kansas) =

Historic building and museum

- U.S. National Register of Historic Places
- Location within Kansas Location within the United States
- Location: 201 N. 4th St., Leoti, Kansas
- Coordinates: 38.48275°N 101.35798°W
- Area: less than one acre
- Built: 1939 to 1942
- Built by: Archer, Cooper, & Robison
- Architect: Griest & Coolidge
- Engineer: C. W. Suit, Consulting Engineer
- Architectural style: Queen Anne
- MPS: New Deal-Era Resources of Kansas
- NRHP reference No.: 100003427
- Added to NRHP: March 7, 2019

The Museum of the Great Plains, in Leoti, Kansas, in Wichita County, Kansas, is a local history museum founded in 1982. It includes the 1892-built Washington-Ames House. It is located in the Municipal Auditorium and City Hall, at 201 N. 4th St., which was built during 1939-42. The building was listed on the National Register of Historic Places in 2019.

== Architecture ==
It was deemed "significant for its association with the Works Progress/Projects Administration (WPA) and as an excellent example of WPA Moderne architecture in western Kansas. The building served as city hall, fire department, municipal auditorium, and meeting hall for the American Legion. 10 In the early 1980s, the city of Leoti gave the building to the Wichita County Historical Society, which has operated the Museum of the Great Plains out of this building since 1983. Due to its association with the New Deal, this building is nominated to the National Register of Historic Places under the New Deal-era Resources of Kansas MPS as an example of the Civic property type."

It was built of native limestone and poured-in-place concrete.
