= Wilcox Classical Museum =

- Former names: Classical Museum (until 1929)
- Established: 1888; 138 years ago
- Location: Lawrence, Kansas
- Coordinates: 38°57′28″N 95°14′39″W
- Type: University museum
- Collections: Ancient Greek and Roman artifacts, plaster casts
- Director: Dr. Phil Stinson
- Curator: Dr. Phil Stinson
- Website: wilcox.ku.edu/s/wilcox/page/home

The Wilcox Classical Museum is a university museum in Lawrence, Kansas operated by the University of Kansas' Department of Classics. The collection, originally known simply as the "Classical Museum", was formally established in 1888, making it the oldest museum on KU's campus.

== History ==
The museum was organized by University of Kansas Classics professors D. H. Robinson and Alexander M. Wilcox, both of whom hoped it would be a major boon to the university's Latin and Greek departments. The collection was eventually renamed in 1929 to honor Wilcox, who from 1916 until his death in 1928 had served as the museum's curator.

== Collections ==
The core of the museum is a series of plaster cast replicas of famous Classical sculptures, including Hermes and the Infant Dionysus, the Resting Satyr, the Apollo Belvedere, the Winged Victory of Samothrace, the Venus de Milo, and many of the Elgin Marbles. The museum also houses an ancient coin collection, and an assortment of votive objects, lamps, vases, various stone inscriptions, and a collection of Etruscan artifacts donated by Alice Rohe.

== See also ==
- List of museums in Kansas
