= Blair Theatre =

Theatre in Kansas, United States

- The Blair
- Interactive map of Blair Theatre
- Address: 1310 19th St; Belleville, Kansas
- Location: U.S.
- Coordinates: 39°49′21.1″N 97°37′50″W
- Owner: Blair Center for the Arts Foundation
- Capacity: 369
- Screen: 1
- Current use: Cinema, Rentals, Community Events

Construction
- Groundbreaking: 1927
- Built: 1928
- Opened: December 24, 1928
- Renovated: 1987; 2000–2008
- Closed: 1997
- Reopened: November 8, 2008
- Builder: Blair Theatre Enterprises
- Project manager: Sam H. Blair

Website
- www.theblairtheater.com

The Blair Theatre is a venue located in North Central Kansas in the city of Belleville, Kansas, in Republic County.

== History ==
Construction on the Blair Theatre began in 1927 by Blair Theatre Enterprises. While excavating the site for the theater, the remains of a cowboy were found buried on the site. The exterior of the theater is Spanish Eclectic. The auditorium was styled after Andalusian gardens. It was originally built as a venue for Vaudeville performances and later transitioned to a movie theater. A sandwich shop and a Western Union office we also included as part of what is now the lobby. In 1938, the auditorium was renovated to art deco decor.

In 1941, the theater was sold to Commonwealth Theaters.

In June 1987, the theater was sold by Commonwealth Theaters to Struve Enterprises, Inc of Deshler, NE. The auditorium was split in half and converted to a two-screen cinema. The lobby also housed a small video rental shop.

Citing competition from school and community events, the theater closed on May 1, 1996, but continued to rent videos out of the lobby while attempting to sell the building. After not finding a suitable buyer, the deed for the building was transferred to the city of Belleville. In July of that year, the city manager proposed turning the theater into a community center with one portion of the building being an auditorium, one portion being an exhibit hall, and the lobby used for small receptions. During the summer, an agreement with the Kansas State University Interior Architecture program was entered into in order to determine the possible uses for the theater as well as the costs associated with preserving and adapting the theater. The study was presented to the city on December 13, 1997.

In May 1999, the Highbanks Hall of Fame & National Midget Auto Racing Museum asked to use the lobby of the theatre for a racing display and the city negotiated a temporary lease agreement with the organization. This lease was renewed until December 31, 2000.

=== Formation of the Blair Center for the Arts Foundation ===
In January 2000, after years of inaction by the city, the North Central Kansas Association of Artists (NCKAA) expressed interest formed a group to start reusing the theatre. They helped form a not-for-profit business called the Blair Center for the Arts Foundation (the Blair) with the intent of revitalizing the theater and turning it into a facility for the community to use and enjoy. Over the next several years, an aggressive capital campaign was executed and with the help of tax credits, private donations, and minimal government funding the organization was able to begin restoring the theater. By November 2008, they were able to open the theater once again for movies as well as small community events.

In the late 2010s, the Blair entered the planning stages to convert an adjacent storefront it owns to a second cinema in order to offer more programming to the local community.

=== COVID-19 pandemic ===
On March 22, 2020, due to the COVID-19 pandemic, the Blair chose to temporarily close. On June 8, 2020, the Blair reopened but later decided to cancel its standard programming and ceased regular operations on July 30, 2020, due to a lack of ticket sales as well as an increase in COVID-19 cases in the county.

== Current programming ==
Currently, the Blair presents movies and is a host for local community events.

== Restoration efforts ==
While most of the work on the audience side of the proscenium was completed prior to the venue reopening in 2008, the backstage and stagecraft areas of the theater were not finished. The Blair is currently in the preliminary planning stages to determine what is needed to finish the remainder of the theater.

== See also ==
- Republic County, Kansas
- Belleville, Kansas
