= Old Castle Hall =

- Old Castle Hall, Baker University
- U.S. National Register of Historic Places
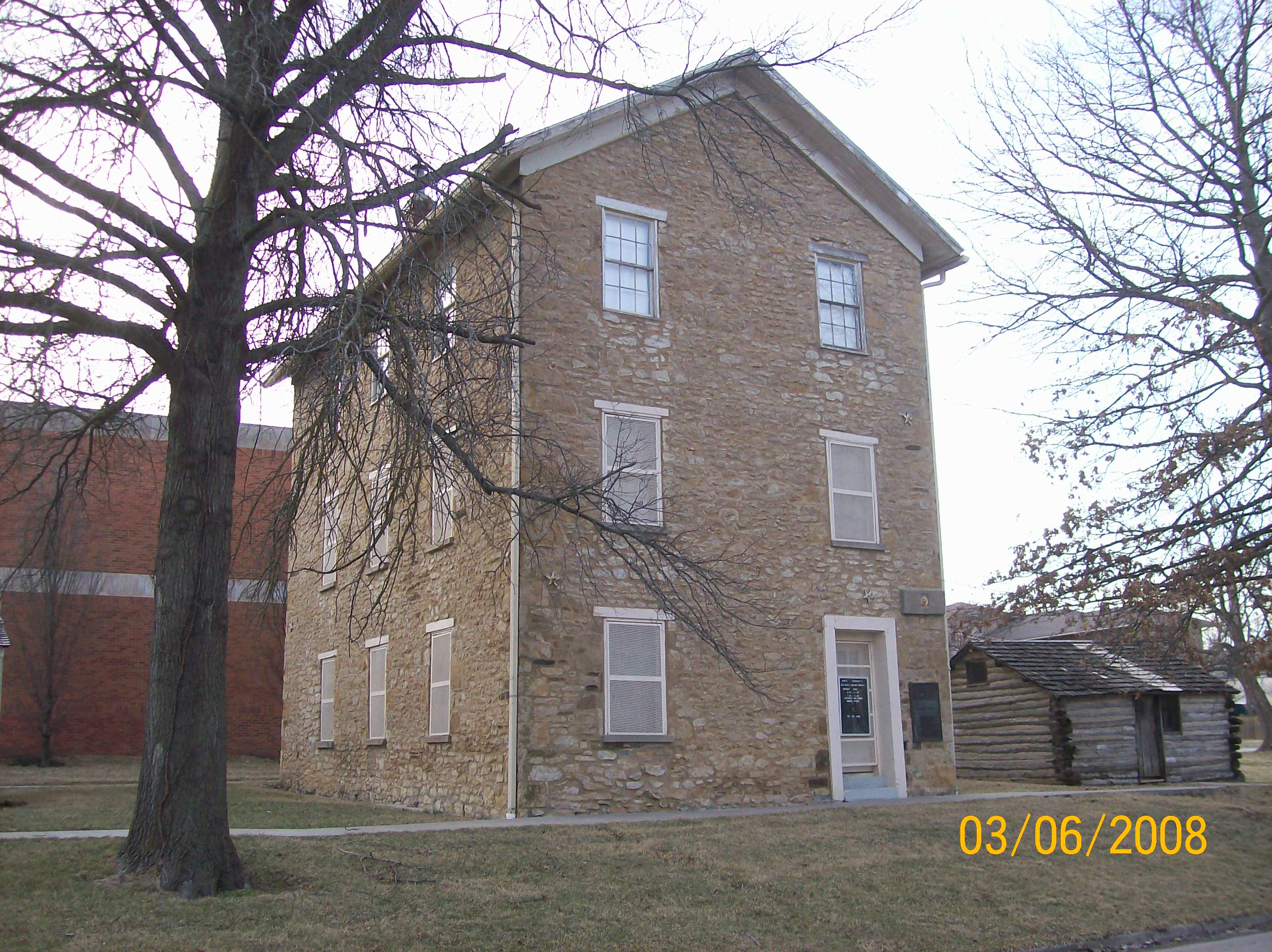

- Location within Kansas Location within the United States
- Location: 513 5th St., Baldwin City, Kansas
- Coordinates: 38°46′38″N 95°11′4″W
- Area: 1 acre (0.40 ha)
- Built: 1858
- Architectural style: Plains Vernacular
- NRHP reference No.: 71000309
- Added to NRHP: February 24, 1971

Old Castle Hall was the first building of Baker University in Baldwin City, Kansas. It was built in 1857–58 to house the university on its first two floors, with the Palmyra Masonic Lodge occupying the third floor. It was used for classes until 1871, when other buildings were constructed for the purpose, and later used as a mill, a dormitory and for storage. The third floor was rebuilt during its service as a mill to address structural problems.

The building was restored in the 1950s and maintained as the Old Castle Museum. The museum features artifacts from early state, Methodist, and University history.

The hall is of rubble stone construction with crude quoining at the corners. The reconstruction of the third floor is visible by the change in material pattern on the outside. The overall plan is a rectangle. The interior has been extensively altered.

Old Castle Hall was listed on the National Register of Historic Places on February 24, 1971.
