= Fromme-Birney Round Barn =

- U.S. National Register of Historic Places
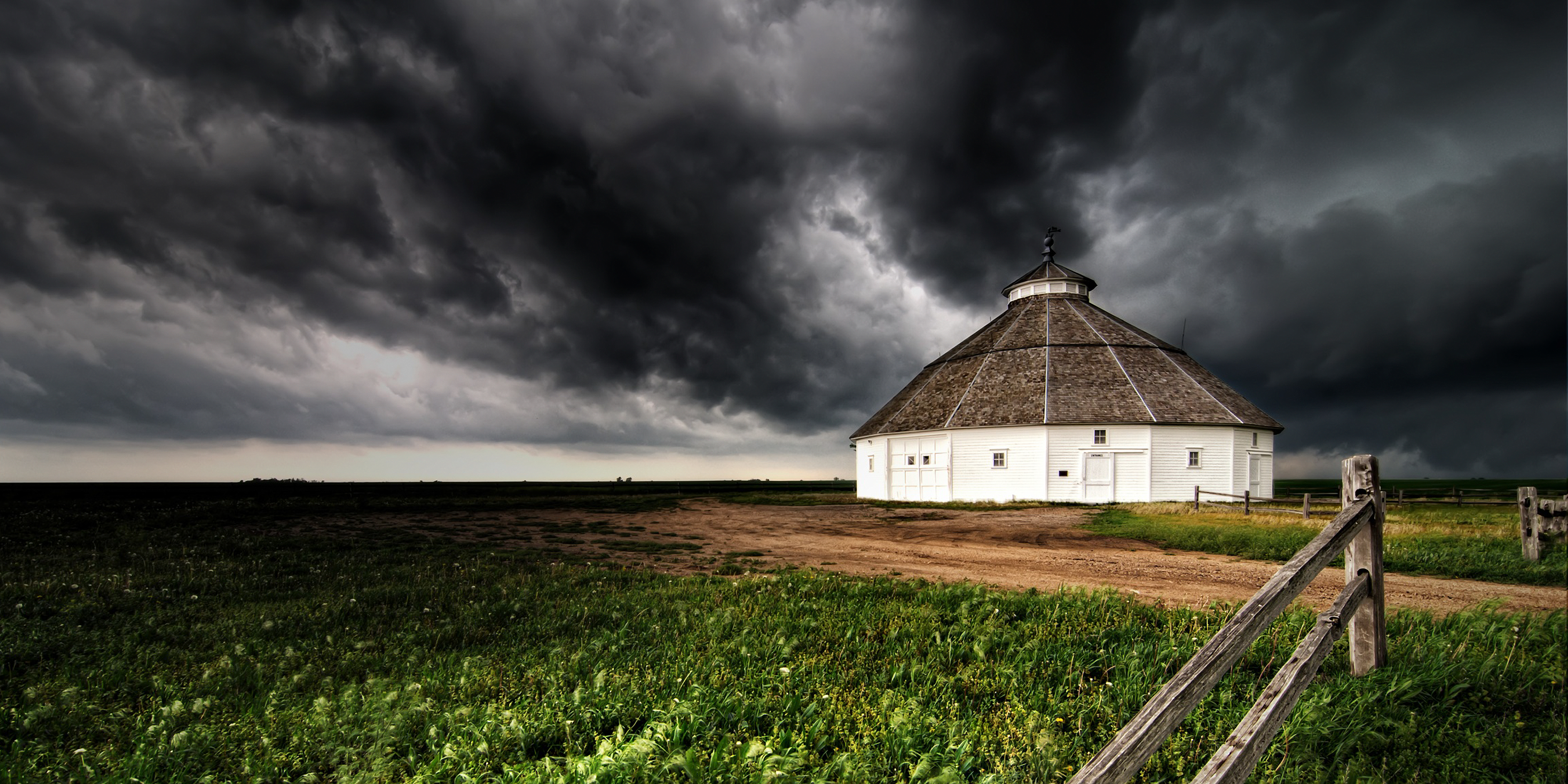

- Location within Kansas Location within the United States
- Nearest city: Mullinville, Kansas
- Coordinates: 37°31′36″N 99°30′30″W
- Area: less than one acre
- Built: 1912; 114 years ago
- Built by: Campbell, William "Pat"
- NRHP reference No.: 87001253
- Added to NRHP: July 16, 1987

The Fromme-Birney Round Barn near Mullinville, Kansas, United States, is a round barn that was built in 1912. The barn is 50 feet (15 m) tall and 70 feet (21 m) in diameter and built with 16 sides to appear round. It was built to house draft horses but the horses were eventually replaced by tractors as the years went on. It was listed on the National Register of Historic Places in 1987.

The barn is now owned and operated by the Kiowa County Historical Society and is open daily for visits.
