= Museum of World Treasures =

Museum in Wichita, Kansas

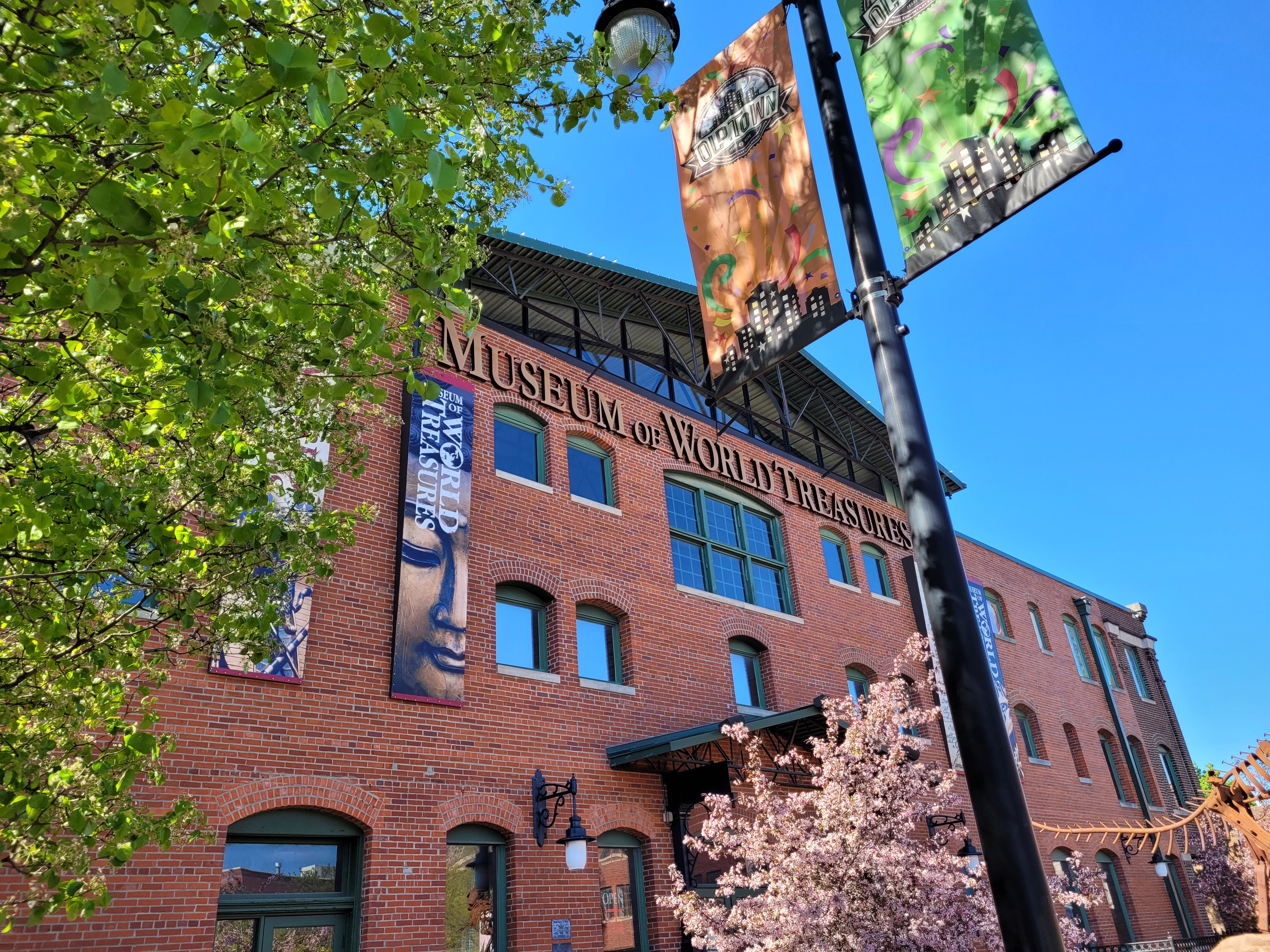

- Location within Kansas
- Established: 2001
- Location: 835 East 1st Street, Wichita, KS 67202 United States
- Coordinates: 37.687305°N 97.327890°W
- Website: worldtreasures.org

Museum of World Treasures is a world history museum in Wichita, Kansas, United States. Among the many items on display are Tyrannosaurus, Daspletosaurus, and Tylosaurus specimens (Including "Ivan the T. rex"), Egyptian mummies, signatures of all the American presidents, a section of the Berlin Wall, and a genuine shrunken head. The Museum of World Treasures is not limited to a particular era of history, but has opted to display a diverse collection representing many different fields of interest and a wide range of subjects. This museum is a member of the American Alliance of Museums, but is not accredited by the organization.

== History ==
The museum first opened as the Museum of Ancient Treasures on April 22, 2001, at the Garvey Building in Downtown Wichita. The bulk of the exhibits were originally from the collection of the museum's founder, Dr. Jon Kardatzke.

In less than a year, the size and diversity of the museum's collection had changed. It now consisted of over 30 individual private collections, and spanned numerous significant events and cultures from prehistory to the present. Spurred by the purchase of three complete fossil dinosaur skeletons, the museum was forced to look for a larger space to exhibit its vast and growing collection.

The museum relocated to the "Farm and Art Market" in Old Town, Wichita, in 2003 and was renamed The Museum of World Treasures. The new location is a reconstructed three story warehouse that was completely renovated to house the expansive museum collection.

There have now been over 300 collectors who have their items stored and on display as loans or donations at the Museum. The museum owns approximately 75% of the artifacts.

== Layout ==
The three stories of the museum contain a diverse array of historical artifacts. Access to the separate floors can be obtained via a central spiral staircase, or the popular glass elevator that rises above the towering dinosaur exhibit. The first floor also contains the entry foyer and Museum Store.

=== First floor ===
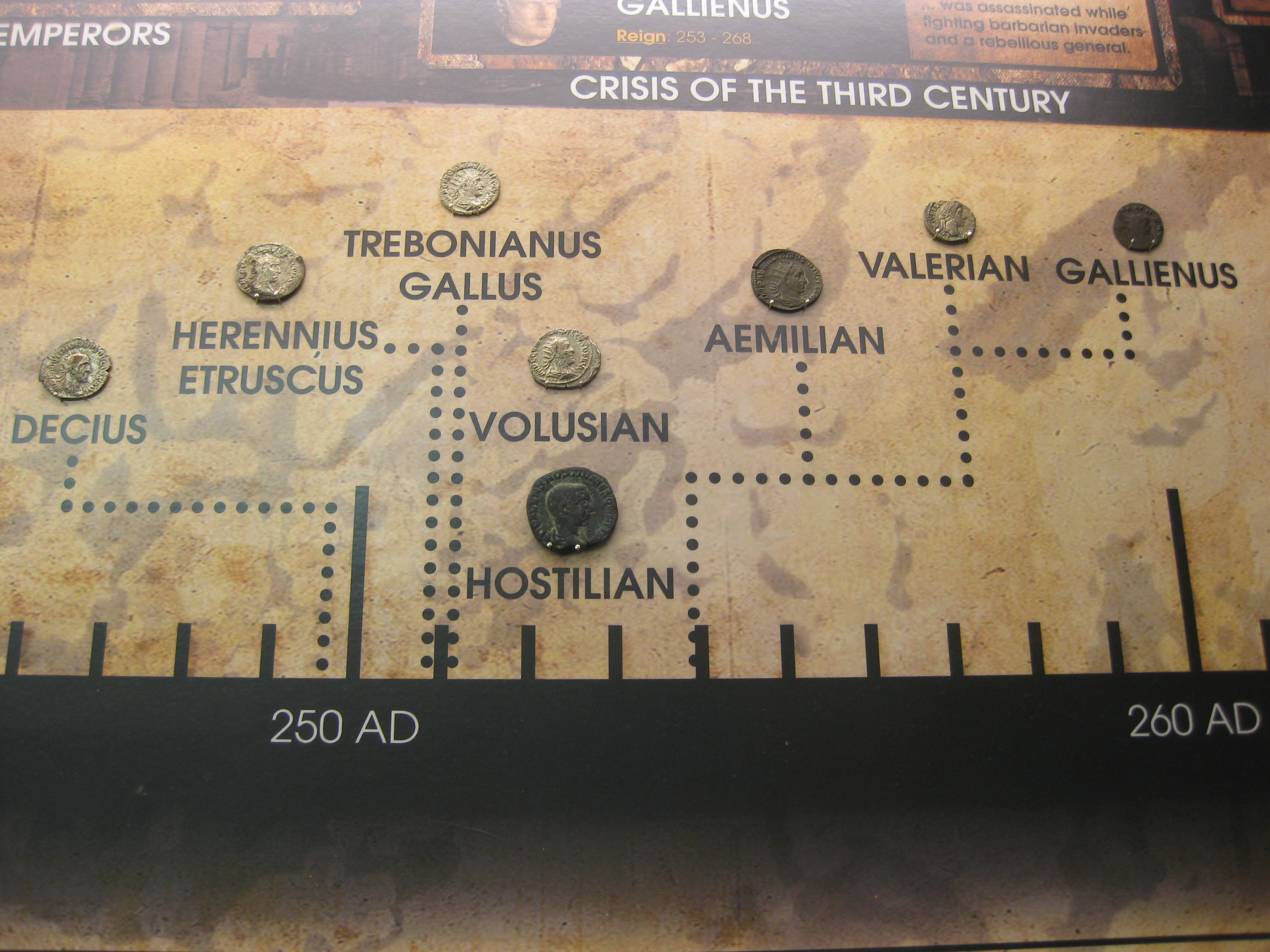
A piece of the 50 ft. long Timeline featuring all the Roman Emperors and their coinage.

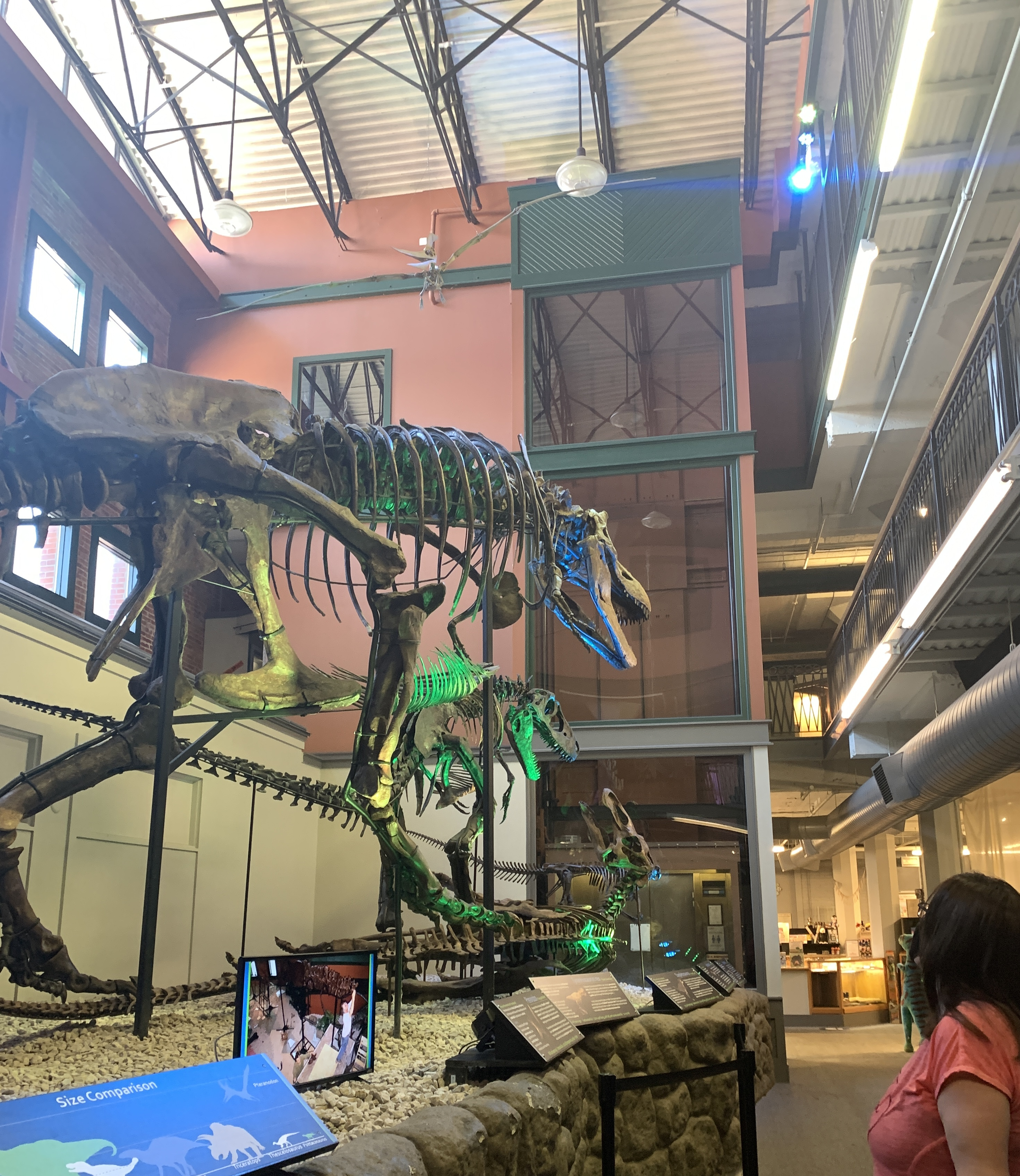
Ivan's size in comparison to an onlooker.

The 1st floor of the museum focuses on fossils and ancient human history, as well as a room dedicated to geology. Exhibits of note are:

- Ivan the T. rex - found by Alan Komrosky and Gary Olson in 2007, this giant Tyrannosaurus rex is about 65% fossil. When it was found, it had the most complete tail of any T. rex, with only three vertebrae missing.
- "Sea Creatures of the Plains" - Showcasing marine fossils from the Late Cretaceous Western interior seaway of Kansas. Such as a 34 ft. Tylosaurus proriger, named Logan after Logan county, Kansas, where it was excavated. Across from Logan is a Xiphactinus audax, a large predatory fish that once lived alongside Tylosaurus.
- Egyptian mummies - Female mummies from ancient Egypt
- Coins of the Roman Emperors - A 50 ft. time line that showcases gold, silver, and bronze coins from nearly every Roman Emperor, as well as write-ups on their exploits and conquests.
- World Civilizations - Greek, Roman, Etruscan, Egyptian, Pre Columbian, African, Southeast Asian & Ancient Near East showcases.

=== Second floor ===
The 2nd floor of the Museum focuses on military history, presidents, and royalty from around the world. Exhibits of note are:

- More Than Darkness - Documents and artifacts from the Middle Ages.
- A Touch of Classicism: Telling the Story of the Renaissance - A journey through the cultural phenomenon known as the Renaissance.
- Military Gallery - Weaponry and artifacts from the Revolutionary War, the American Civil War, World War I (including a large scale recreation of Trench Warfare), World War II, the Korean War, and the Vietnam War.
- American Presidents Gallery - Contains the signature of every American president, as well as a replica of the famous Resolute Desk.

=== Third floor ===
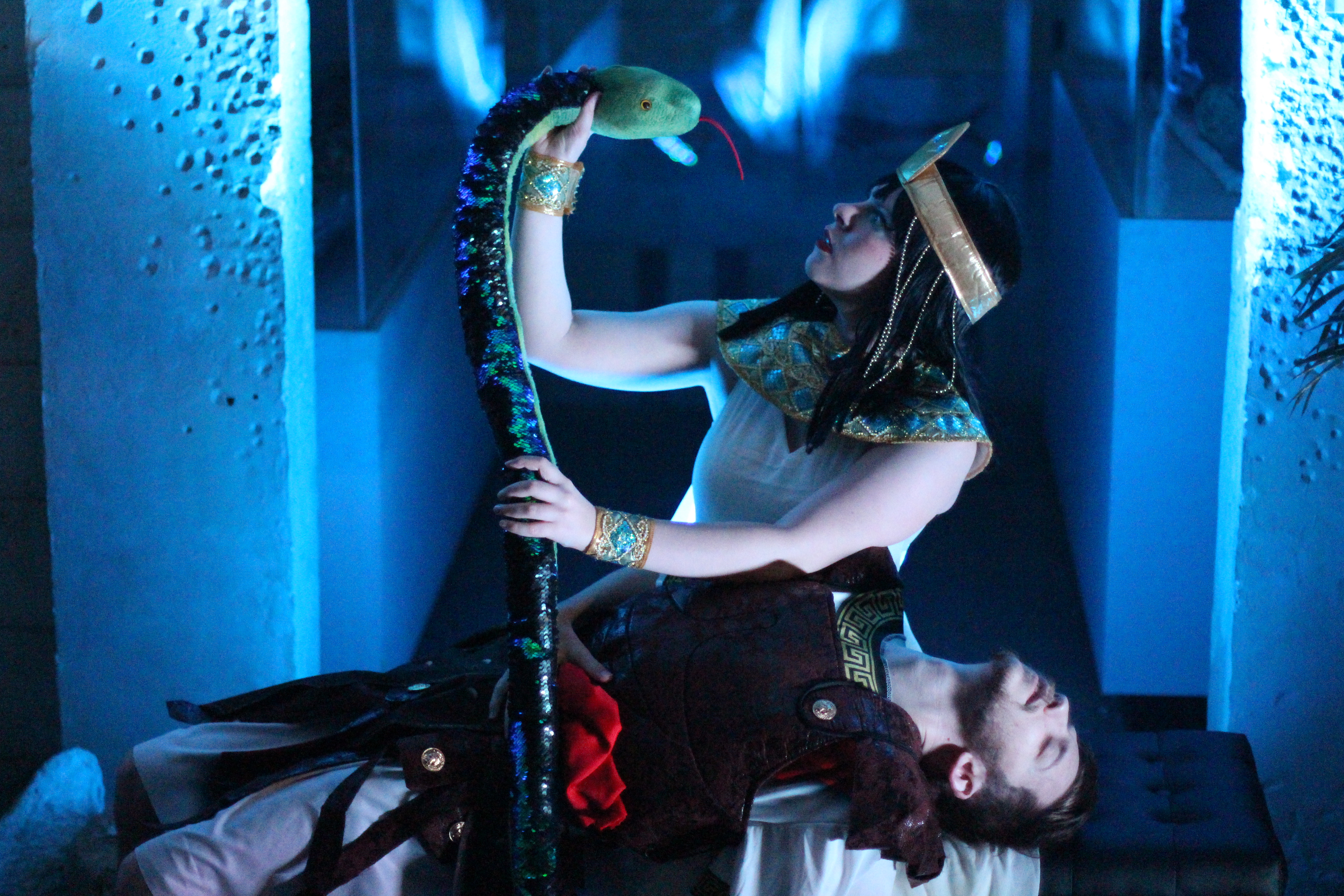
Events such as Night of the Living Museum bring history to life for visitors

The exhibits on the 3rd floor feature an ensemble of material from American history. In addition, the top floor of the museum also has a large banquet room that can be rented out for private functions. Exhibits of note are:

- All Are Not Free - features artifacts from the Cold War telling the story of life east of the Iron Curtain.
- Ivan's PlayHouse - A kid-oriented play space with educational components.
- Romancing the West - contains cowboys, Native Americans, frontier living, the Pony Express, and other Western artifacts.
- Historic Composers and Music - features original manuscripts from Mozart, Beethoven, Elvis, and Frank Sinatra.
- Kardatzke Historic Authors Collection - collections of famous historic authors and poets such as Robert Frost and Mark Twain.
- Rentable Event Space - a large space that may be rented for weddings, dinners, meetings, and more.

=== Rotating exhibits ===
Some exhibits featured at the Museum of World Treasures are on display for a limited time.

== Organization ==
The Museum of World Treasures is a not-for-profit 501(c)(3) Kansas corporation. The Museum is governed by a board of directors.

== Programming ==
The museum focuses heavily on its mission to educate, entertain, and inspire with programs such as:

- Camp-Ins
- Educational Tours
- Scout Programs
- Community Outreach Programs
- Educational Partnerships
- Adult programming in the form of lectures and evening events

== See also ==
Nearby museums west of Arkansas River in Wichita:

- Botanica, The Wichita Gardens
- Exploration Place
- Mid-America All-Indian Center
- Old Cowtown Museum
- Wichita Art Museum

Nearby museums east of Arkansas River in downtown and oldtown areas of Wichita:

- Great Plains Transportation Museum
- Kansas Sports Hall of Fame
- Wichita-Sedgwick County Historical Museum
