= Museum of Deaf History, Arts and Culture =

Museum in Olathe, Kansas, United States

- Established: 2001
- Location: Olathe, Kansas, United States
- Coordinates: 38.8819°N 94.8113°W
- Type: Cultural museum
- President: Chriz Dally
- Website: www.museumofdeaf.org

The Museum of Deaf History, Arts and Culture is a museum dedicated to the unique culture of Deaf and hard of hearing people in the United States. The museum opened in 2001 in Olathe, Kansas, across the street from the Kansas School for the Deaf.

== History and location ==
A museum collection named after William J. Marra, a long-time teacher at the Kansas School for the Deaf, was dedicated at the school in September 1986. Marra collected memorabilia from the school and other memorabilia of Deaf culture for over four decades. Marra's collection was first housed in the basement of the school's Robert Hall.

The idea for starting a deaf cultural center in Olathe began in 1988, after a new highway sign noting the location of the Kansas School for the Deaf was installed, leading to increased interest from passersby. The Kansas Educational Foundation incorporated in 1992 to fundraise and construct a building across the street from the Kansas School for the Deaf. Construction began in December 1995 and the building was opened on September 29, 2001; the first museum exhibit was created in 2005. The organization's name changed multiple times, beginning as the Kansas Educational Foundation, renamed to the Deaf Cultural Center Foundation in 2009, and renamed again in 2017 as the Museum of Deaf History, Arts & Culture, Inc.

In 2005 Marra's collection was moved across the street and became the William J. Marra Museum of Deaf History, which is now located within the Museum of Deaf History, Arts and Culture.

== Programming ==
The museum features multiple events throughout the year. The cultural series features presentations related to Deaf history, arts and culture, along with hands-on immersive workshops introducing elementary school students to Deaf culture and sign language. Visual arts classes, performing arts performances, and American Sign Language classes are part of the organization's outreach efforts. In partnership with The Nelson-Atkins Museum of Art, the museum has coordinated multiple Deaf Cultural Day events, featuring art activities, American Sign Language poetry performances, and film screenings.
