= Belleville, Kansas =

City in Republic County, Kansas

- City and County seat
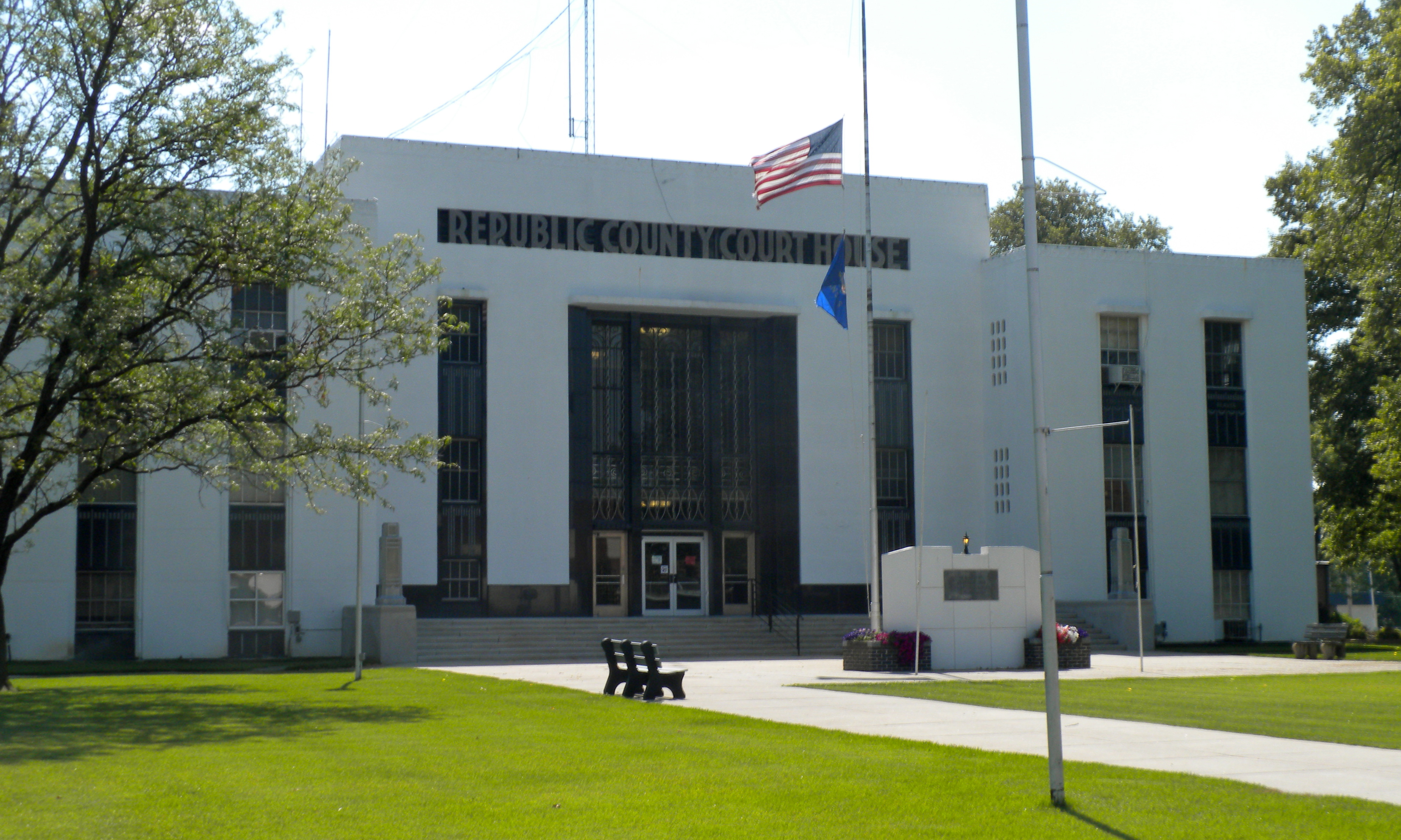
- Republic County Courthouse (2010)

- Location within Republic County and Kansas

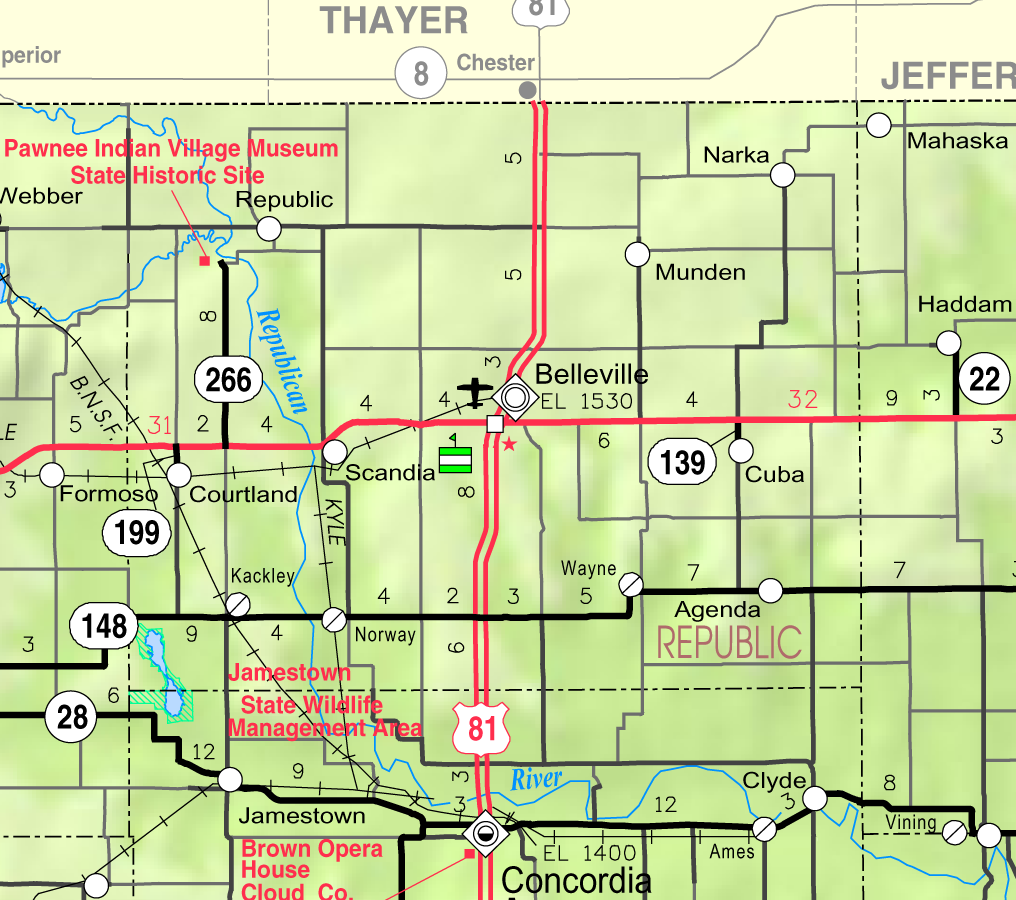
- KDOT map of Republic County (legend)
- Coordinates: 39°49′28″N 97°38′01″W
- Country: United States
- State: Kansas
- County: Republic
- Founded: 1869
- Incorporated: 1887
- Named for: Arabelle Tutton

Area
  - Total: 2.08 sq mi (5.39 km^{2})
  - Land: 2.04 sq mi (5.29 km^{2})
  - Water: 0.039 sq mi (0.10 km^{2})
- Elevation: 1,545 ft (471 m)

Population (2020)
  - Total: 2,007
  - Density: 983/sq mi (379/km^{2})
- Time zone: UTC-6 (CST)
  - Summer (DST): UTC-5 (CDT)
- ZIP Code: 66935
- Area code: 785
- FIPS code: 20-05600
- GNIS ID: 485546
- Website: City website

Belleville is a city in and the county seat of Republic County, Kansas, United States. As of the 2020 census, the population of the city was 2,007.

== History ==
Belleville was founded in 1869, and incorporated as a city in 1878. It was named for Arabelle Tutton, the wife of a member of the town company.

The first post office in Belleville was established in February 1870.

== Geography ==
According to the United States Census Bureau, the city has a total area of 2.02 square miles (5.23 km^{2}), of which 1.98 square miles (5.13 km^{2}) is land and 0.04 square miles (0.10 km^{2}) is water.

=== Climate ===
Climate data for Belleville, Kansas (1991–2020 normals, extremes 1935–present)
Month	Jan	Feb	Mar	Apr	May	Jun	Jul	Aug	Sep	Oct	Nov	Dec	Year
Record high °F (°C)	78 (26)	85 (29)	93 (34)	97 (36)	100 (38)	111 (44)	113 (45)	114 (46)	113 (45)	101 (38)	85 (29)	80 (27)	114 (46)
Mean maximum °F (°C)	60.5 (15.8)	66.8 (19.3)	78.1 (25.6)	85.3 (29.6)	91.8 (33.2)	97.1 (36.2)	101.5 (38.6)	99.6 (37.6)	95.3 (35.2)	87.5 (30.8)	72.5 (22.5)	61.8 (16.6)	102.7 (39.3)
Mean daily maximum °F (°C)	37.5 (3.1)	42.1 (5.6)	54.3 (12.4)	64.3 (17.9)	74.2 (23.4)	85.2 (29.6)	90.0 (32.2)	87.6 (30.9)	80.2 (26.8)	66.9 (19.4)	52.5 (11.4)	40.3 (4.6)	64.6 (18.1)
Daily mean °F (°C)	26.5 (−3.1)	30.4 (−0.9)	41.4 (5.2)	51.6 (10.9)	62.8 (17.1)	73.7 (23.2)	78.4 (25.8)	75.9 (24.4)	67.6 (19.8)	54.3 (12.4)	40.5 (4.7)	29.7 (−1.3)	52.7 (11.5)
Mean daily minimum °F (°C)	15.5 (−9.2)	18.7 (−7.4)	28.5 (−1.9)	38.9 (3.8)	51.3 (10.7)	62.1 (16.7)	66.9 (19.4)	64.1 (17.8)	55.0 (12.8)	41.6 (5.3)	28.6 (−1.9)	19.1 (−7.2)	40.9 (4.9)
Mean minimum °F (°C)	−2.8 (−19.3)	.12 (−17.71)	11.1 (−11.6)	23.9 (−4.5)	36.7 (2.6)	49.9 (9.9)	56.8 (13.8)	54.6 (12.6)	40.1 (4.5)	25.6 (−3.6)	12.8 (−10.7)	2.3 (−16.5)	−7.0 (−21.7)
Record low °F (°C)	−19 (−28)	−21 (−29)	−14 (−26)	10 (−12)	25 (−4)	40 (4)	46 (8)	41 (5)	25 (−4)	14 (−10)	−10 (−23)	−25 (−32)	−25 (−32)
Average precipitation inches (mm)	0.61 (15)	0.97 (25)	1.49 (38)	2.75 (70)	4.57 (116)	4.34 (110)	4.46 (113)	3.72 (94)	3.12 (79)	2.50 (64)	1.15 (29)	0.92 (23)	30.60 (777)
Average snowfall inches (cm)	4.0 (10)	4.9 (12)	2.5 (6.4)	0.1 (0.25)	0.0 (0.0)	0.0 (0.0)	0.0 (0.0)	0.0 (0.0)	0.0 (0.0)	0.3 (0.76)	1.0 (2.5)	2.5 (6.4)	15.3 (39)
Average precipitation days (≥ 0.01 in)	3.5	3.9	6.0	8.3	9.5	8.3	8.4	7.8	6.3	5.7	4.6	3.3	75.6
Average snowy days (≥ 0.1 in)	2.2	2.1	1.1	0.2	0.0	0.0	0.0	0.0	0.0	0.2	0.7	1.6	8.1
Source: NOAA

== Demographics ==
Historical population
Census	Pop.	Note	%±
1880	238		—
1890	1,868		684.9%
1900	1,833		−1.9%
1910	2,224		21.3%
1920	2,254		1.3%
1930	2,383		5.7%
1940	2,580		8.3%
1950	2,858		10.8%
1960	2,940		2.9%
1970	3,063		4.2%
1980	2,805		−8.4%
1990	2,517		−10.3%
2000	2,239		−11.0%
2010	1,991		−11.1%
2020	2,007		0.8%
U.S. Decennial Census

=== 2020 census ===
As of the 2020 census, Belleville had a population of 2,007, with 919 households and 490 families. The population density was 976.2 per square mile (376.9/km^{2}). There were 1,157 housing units at an average density of 562.7 per square mile (217.3/km^{2}).

The median age was 46.8 years. 22.2% of residents were under the age of 18, 6.3% were from 18 to 24, 20.7% were from 25 to 44, 23.6% were from 45 to 64, and 27.2% were 65 years of age or older. For every 100 females there were 90.1 males, and for every 100 females age 18 and over there were 87.2 males age 18 and over. 0.0% of residents lived in urban areas, while 100.0% lived in rural areas.

There were 919 households, of which 22.3% had children under the age of 18 living in them. Of all households, 41.2% were married-couple households, 21.5% were households with a male householder and no spouse or partner present, and 32.6% were households with a female householder and no spouse or partner present. About 42.2% of all households were made up of individuals and 23.1% had someone living alone who was 65 years of age or older. There were 1,157 housing units, of which 20.6% were vacant. The homeowner vacancy rate was 5.2% and the rental vacancy rate was 21.3%.

Racial composition as of the 2020 census
Race	Number	Percent
White	1,881	93.7%
Black or African American	5	0.2%
American Indian and Alaska Native	10	0.5%
Asian	10	0.5%
Native Hawaiian and Other Pacific Islander	5	0.2%
Some other race	6	0.3%
Two or more races	90	4.5%
Hispanic or Latino (of any race)	52	2.6%

The average household size was 2.1 and the average family size was 3.0. The percent of those with a bachelor's degree or higher was estimated to be 16.5% of the population.

The 2016–2020 5-year American Community Survey estimates show that the median household income was $40,238 (with a margin of error of +/- $8,612) and the median family income was $62,813 (+/- $8,702). Males had a median income of $34,273 (+/- $1,482) versus $25,293 (+/- $7,452) for females. The median income for those above 16 years old was $31,806 (+/- $6,989). Approximately, 4.8% of families and 12.2% of the population were below the poverty line, including 19.2% of those under the age of 18 and 3.8% of those ages 65 or over.

=== 2010 census ===
As of the census of 2010, there were 1,991 people, 949 households, and 533 families living in the city. The population density was 1,005.6 inhabitants per square mile (388.3/km^{2}). There were 1,162 housing units at an average density of 586.9 per square mile (226.6/km^{2}). The racial makeup of the city was 97.5% White, 0.3% African American, 0.2% Native American, 0.6% Asian, 0.5% from other races, and 1.0% from two or more races. Hispanic or Latino of any race were 1.4% of the population.

There were 949 households, of which 19.8% had children under the age of 18 living with them, 47.3% were married couples living together, 6.7% had a female householder with no husband present, 2.1% had a male householder with no wife present, and 43.8% were non-families. 41.3% of all households were made up of individuals, and 24.5% had someone living alone who was 65 years of age or older. The average household size was 1.99 and the average family size was 2.67.

The median age in the city was 51.6 years. 18.1% of residents were under the age of 18; 4.5% were between the ages of 18 and 24; 18% were from 25 to 44; 26.5% were from 45 to 64; and 32.9% were 65 years of age or older. The gender makeup of the city was 46.3% male and 53.7% female.

== Media ==
The city is served by The Belleville Telescope newspaper, established in 1870 and published continuously since 1873.

== Education ==
The community is served by Republic County USD 109 public school district. It was formed in 2006 by the consolidation of Belleville USD 427 and Hillcrest USD 455.

== Area attractions ==
- Blair Theatre
- Boyer Gallery
- Republic County Historical Society Museum
- Belleville High Banks, Named "The fastest dirt track in the world"

== Notable people ==
- Larry Cheney (1886–1969), Major League Baseball player
- Nick Hague (born 1975), NASA astronaut, Colonel in United States Air Force, born in Belleville
- Brian A. Larkins (1946–2025), molecular biologist
- Dean Nesmith, professional football player and noted athletic trainer
- A.Q. Miller, namesake of the A.Q. Miller School of Journalism and Mass Communications at Kansas State University.
