= Boyer Gallery =

Folk art museum in Belleville, Kansas

Coordinates: 39°49′43″N 97°37′51″W

The Boyer Gallery, officially known as the Paul Boyer Museum of Animated Carvings and commonly called "The Boyer Museum", is a folk art museum located at 1205 M Street in Belleville, Kansas, United States. It features the animated sculptures of Paul Boyer. Many of the displays are hand carved wooden pieces that have been animated with hand-built motors and mechanics, while others are working models of aircraft or tractor engines. All of the pieces were built from scratch.

The gallery was closed for several years, but was reopened in 2007 by Boyer's daughters.
