= Southeast Kansas =

Region of Kansas, US

Coordinates: 37.5°N 95.5°W

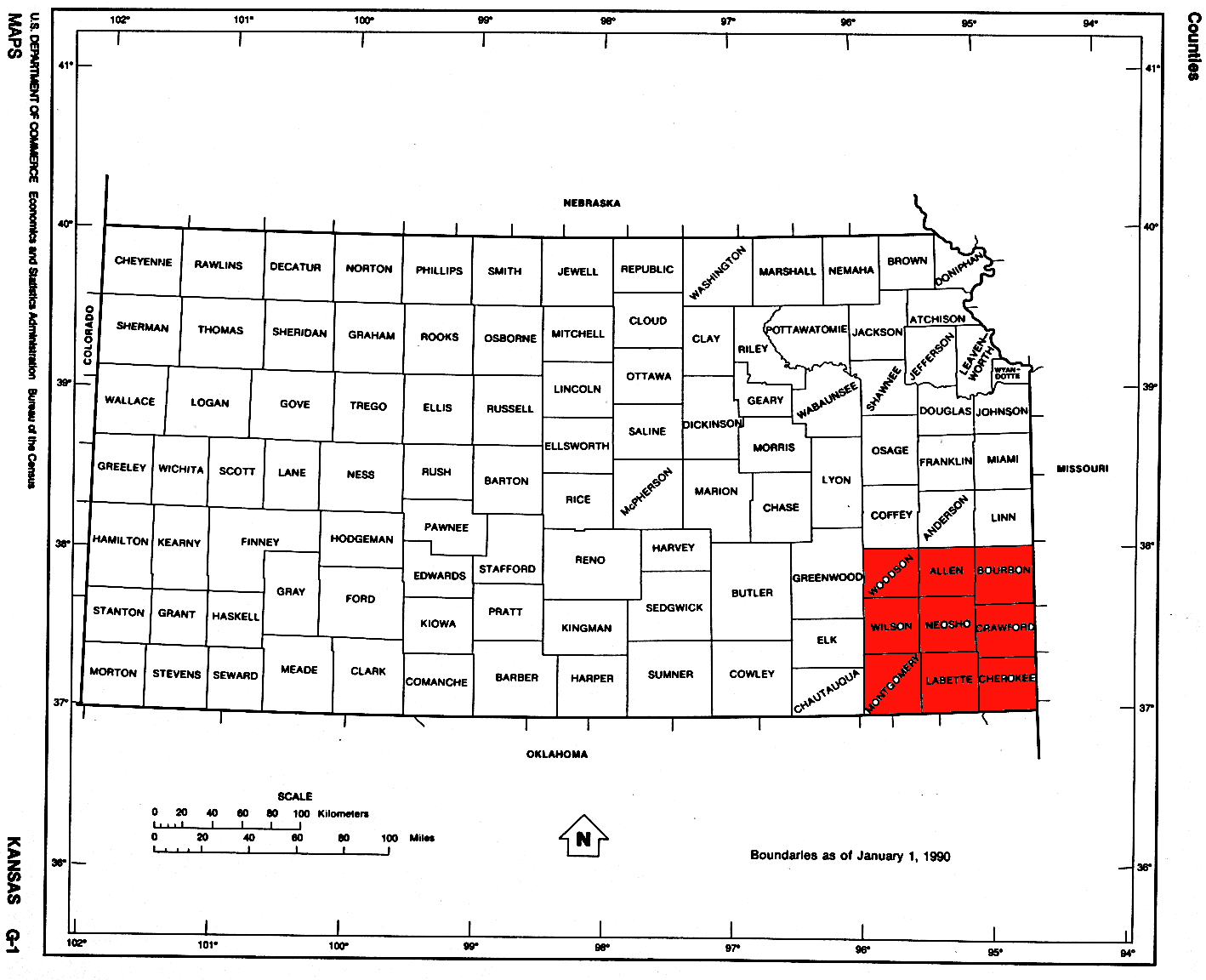
Map of the region

Southeast Kansas is a region of the U.S. state of Kansas. It can be roughly defined by Woodson County in the northwest, Bourbon County in the northeast, Cherokee County in the southeast, and Montgomery County in the southwest. Geographically it is dominated by a broad rolling landscape located between the Flint Hills to the west and includes the Ozarks to the southeast. Some notable towns there include Pittsburg, Parsons, Coffeyville, Independence, Chanute, Fort Scott, and Iola.

The region has a land area of 13,624.13 km² (5,260.30 sq mi) and a 2000 census population of 180,815 inhabitants. It has 6.43% of the state's land area and 6.73% of its population. It is dominated by a broad rolling landscape that includes the Ozarks. It receives more precipitation than any other part of Kansas. Southeast Kansas is located in the tallgrass prairie ecosystem of North America.

Originally inhabited by several Native American tribes, frontier towns largely dependent on cattle ranching, and mining, were wracked by violence over the issue of slavery both before and during the American Civil War (see Bleeding Kansas). While the area was part of the Tri-State lead and zinc mining district of southwest Missouri, southeast Kansas and northeast Oklahoma, the most prevalent mining in Southeast Kansas was coal mining. This is attributed to the amount of coal found and also the quality and thickness of coal in Southeast Kansas. Southeast Kansas offers one of the premier reconstructions of early life in the United States Army at Fort Scott National Historic Site.

== Definition ==
The following nine counties are included in all definitions of Southeast Kansas:

- Allen
- Bourbon
- Cherokee
- Crawford
- Labette
- Montgomery
- Neosho
- Wilson
- Woodson

Southeast Kansas with the addition of Anderson, Chautauqua, Coffey, Elk, and Linn counties is promoted as the Little Ozarks. When KOAM-TV refers to this area, Greenwood is included. The Southeast Kansas Library System also includes Greenwood County in the Southeast Kansas region. When Southeast Kansas, Inc. refers to this area, Miami County is included, with the exclusion of Elk, Chautauqua, and Greenwood counties.

== See also ==
- East-Central Kansas, which partly overlaps with the Little Ozarks region.
