= East-Central Kansas =

Region in Kansas

Coordinates: 38°35′N 95°15′W

East-Central Kansas is a region of Kansas. It is located between the Kansas City metropolitan area and Southeast Kansas, and on the border with Missouri. The region extends westward towards the Flint Hills to Lyon County. East-Central Kansas geographically features rolling hills and deep forested river valleys. The main crop of this predominantly agricultural region is corn. The area is more forested and more moist compared to the rest of the state. East-Central Kansas is rich with state history, as many locations of this region saw battles in Bleeding Kansas, and the infamous abolitionist John Brown and his men battled in Osawatomie. Much of the area is powered by Wolf Creek Nuclear Generating Station which is located near Burlington. The most populous cities of the region include Emporia, Ottawa, Paola, Osawatomie, Garnett, Osage City, Burlington, and Louisburg.

The region consists of the following seven counties:

- Anderson
- Coffey
- Franklin
- Linn
- Lyon
- Miami
- Osage

== See also ==
- The Little Ozarks, which partly overlaps with East-Central Kansas.
