= Mary Seaman Ennis House =

Historic house in Kansas, United States

- U.S. National Register of Historic Places
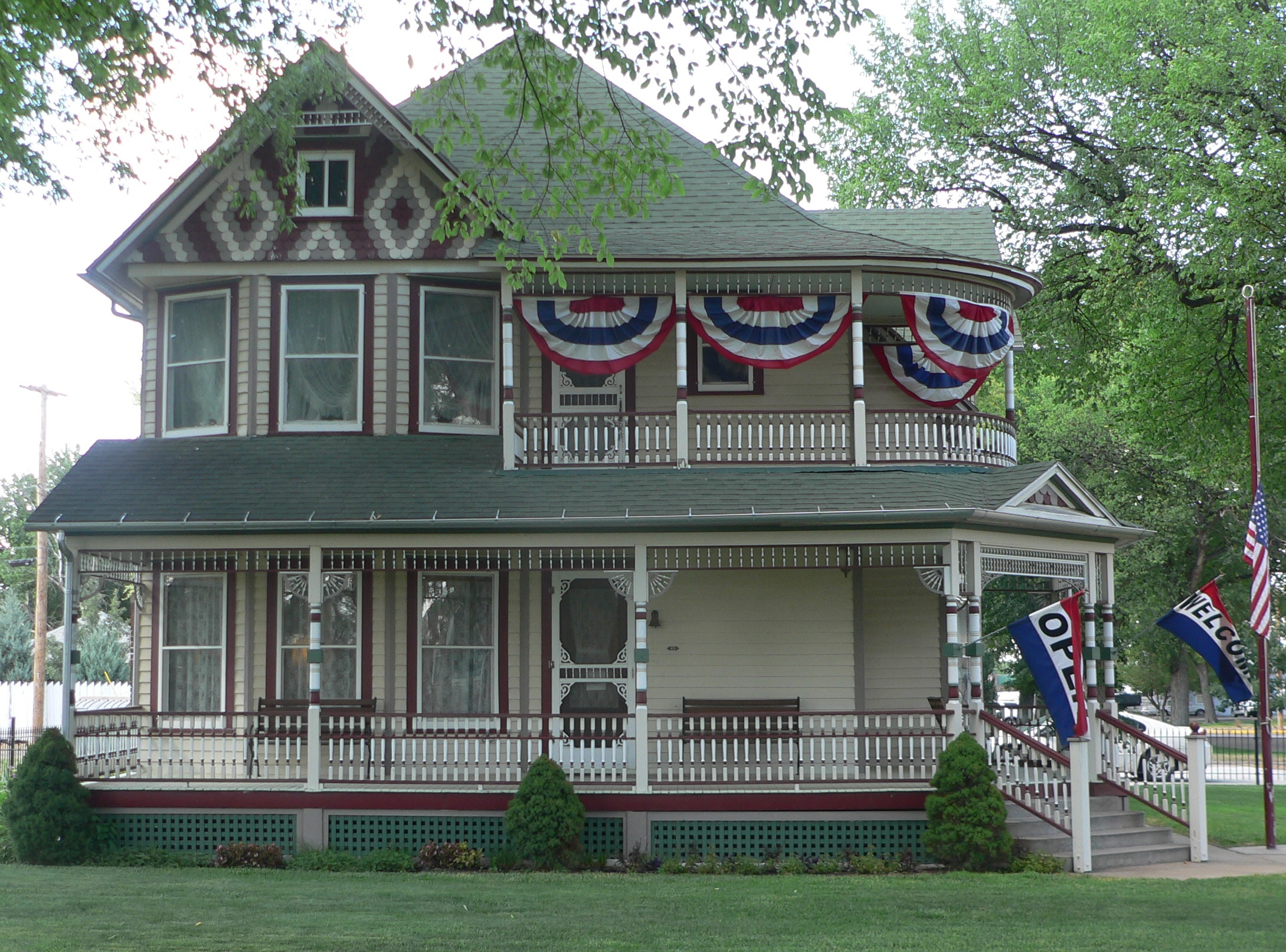
- Photo in 2012

- Location within Kansas Location within the United States
- Location: 202 W. 13th St., Goodland, Kansas
- Coordinates: 39°20′46″N 101°42′48″W
- Area: less than one acre
- Built: 1907
- Built by: Hunt, Fred
- Architectural style: Queen Anne
- NRHP reference No.: 06000598
- Added to NRHP: July 12, 2006

The Mary Seaman Ennis House, located at 202 W. 13th St. in Goodland, Kansas, is a historic Queen Anne style house that was built in 1907 and is listed on the National Register of Historic Places. The house was listed on the National Register in 2006. It was deemed significant as an "outstanding" example of Queen Anne architecture and for association with local builder Fred Hunt.

The house is now known as the Ennis-Handy House and is operated by the Sherman County Historical Society as a Victorian-period historic house museum.
