= Great Plains Transportation Museum =

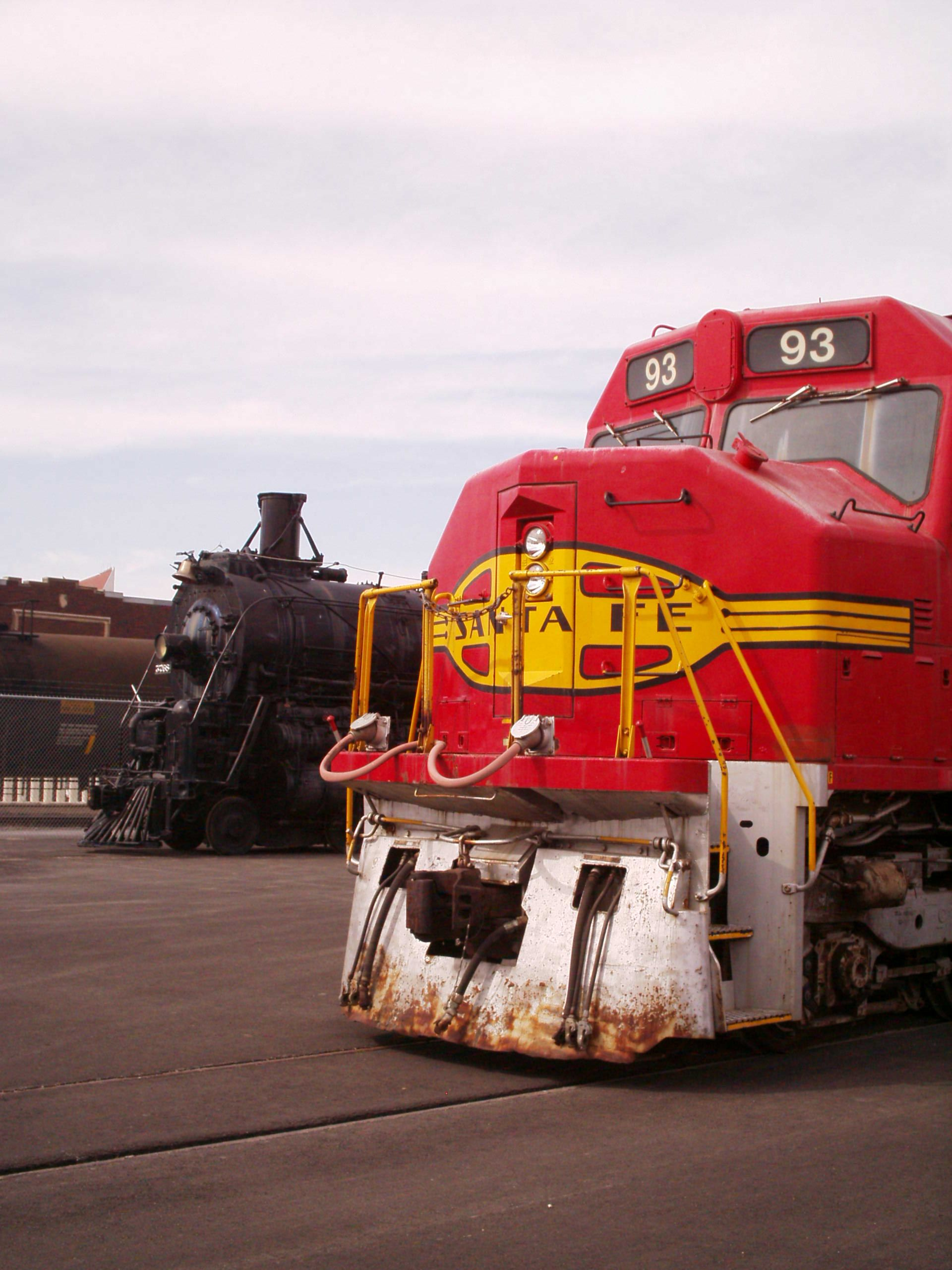
- Santa Fe steam and diesel locomotives on display at the grounds of the Great Plains Transportation Museum (2000)

- Location within Kansas
- Location: 700 East Douglas Ave; Wichita, KS 67202 USA
- Coordinates: 37°41′11″N 97°19′47″W
- Type: Railroad Museum
- Website: gptm.us

The Great Plains Transportation Museum ("GPTM") is a railroad museum in Wichita, Kansas, United States. It is also bome to the Kansas Railroad Hall of Fame.

The museum -- adjacent to an active railroad, and across a street from the city's former train station, downtown -- has several locomotives and other railroad cars, vintage and modern, and indoor exhibits and a gift shop. Visitors are allowed to board some of the cars, including locomotives, and manipulate controls.

== History ==
The Museum was incorporated in 1983, beside Wichita's Douglas Avenue (the main street through downtown), adjacent to the east side of the railroad overpass on the east edge of downtown, and immediately across Douglas from Wichita's idle train terminal, Union Station.

GPTM acquired the assets of the former Great Plains Railway Museum, which had been on the second floor of the Union Station building, but had closed in 1977 when Union Station was cleared out for an urban renewal project, which ultimately led to the building being sold by the City of Wichita to a cable television service, Multimedia Cablevision.

The building sale included the abandoned Santa Fe steam locomotive 3768, which was not relevant to Multimedia's business, so it was donated to the GPTM. The prior museum's assets included a former KG&E electric locomotive, a Frisco wooden caboose, and a Santa Fe drovers’ car, all of which were acquired by the GPTM, along with a former Frisco switcher locomotive stored by Burlington Northern.

In the summer of 1985, volunteers fenced in the property to protect the outdoor displays. The mainly outdoor museum needed space for office, gift shop, and indoor displays, so space was leased in the track-level (second) floor of the Player Piano building, adjacent to the museum space at the tracks.

Thus equipped with sufficient rolling stock artifacts and indoor accommodations to attract the public, the Museum opened to the public in December 1986, and held a “Grand Opening” in June 1987. A Douglas Street-level entrance was opened beginning in November 1999, and the museum acquired additional rolling stock (including various locomotives), and railroading artifacts, memorabilia, and books, improving attendance.

In 2023, actor and rail enthusiast Michael Gross helped boost fundraising for the cosmetic restoration of the museum's 1967 Santa Fe diesel locomotive #93, to meet an estimated cost of around $193,000, and the Wichita-based Kansas and Oklahoma Railroad volunteered the inspections required for the locomotive to use the rails to-and-from restoration facilities at Mid America Car in Kansas City, Missouri. By 2025, the funds had been raised, but costs had grown another $90,000. That, too, was covered by donations, and the locomotive was scheduled to arrive in Wichita in the Summer of 2026.

In 2025, the museum hired its first paid employee: Museum Director Lon Smith, who had formerly led other local museums, including the Museum of World Treasures, the Kansas Aviation Museum, and an interactive animated-dinosaur museum, and had also headed the Wichita Independent Business Association. Smith indicated his goal was to greatly increase attendance, and develop "multiple revenue streams" for the museum, add children’s education and activity centers, increase memberships, and make the museum an essential part of downtown planning.

In March 2026, Smith announced the museum would be converting its 1953 stainless steel baggage car for rental use as an event venue.

== Kansas Railroad Hall of Fame ==
In early 2026 — at the urging of museum director Lon Smith, state senator Oletha Faust-Goudeau (D-Wichita), and local business and tourism organizations — the Kansas Legislature formally established the Kansas Railroad Hall of Fame, setting the Museum as its location. July 20, 2026, Kansas Governor Laura Kelly came to the museum for a ceremonial signing of Sen. Faust-Goudeau's bill establishing the Hall of Fame.

Candidates for enshrinement must have...:

- Worked within Kansas with an officially sanctioned railroad operating in Kansas; or
- Worked in Kansas in the manufacture of railroad-related products, rail cars or locomotives; or
- Been otherwise significantly involved in the railroad industry in Kansas;

...and have...

- Contributed significantly to rail service in Kansas, or to the preservation of Kansas’ rail heritage.

A selection committee will manage the hall of fame and select inductees.

The first class of inductees are expected to be announced in November, 2026, with the first induction ceremony in April 2027.

== Events ==
The Museum hosts various events, on- and off-site, largely as fund-raisers.

- Railfest: The Museum's annual Railfest provides interactive exhibits and activities for visitors of all ages, with the declared priority of expanding understanding and appreciation of the role of railroads in society. Railfest usually includes the opportunity to buy very short "rides" on actual locomotives and/or rail cars.

The Museum also hosts two annual fundraising events:

- the Baron's Ball (a grand banquet and dance), and
- the Baron's Back Nine Golf Tournament.

The Museum has repeatedly hosted the annual global convention of the Santa Fe Railway Historical & Modeling Society.

== Collection ==
The museum's collection includes 6 locomotives and several pieces of rolling stock used on freight and passenger trains.

- Atchison, Topeka and Santa Fe Railway 4-8-4 steam locomotive #3768.
- Atchison, Topeka and Santa Fe Railway EMD SDFP45 diesel locomotive #93.
- Burlington Northern Railroad EMD NW2 diesel locomotive #421 (Ex-St. Louis - San Francisco Railway #261)
- Cargill Incorporated Whitcomb 50-DE-58a-1 #316
- Various other diesel locomotives
- An electric locomotive
- A drover's car
- A tank car
- A box car
- Maintenance of way equipment
- A Postal storage car
- A heavyweight baggage car
- Various types of cabooses
