= Washington-Ames House =

Historic house in Kansas, United States

- William B. and Julia Washington House
- U.S. National Register of Historic Places
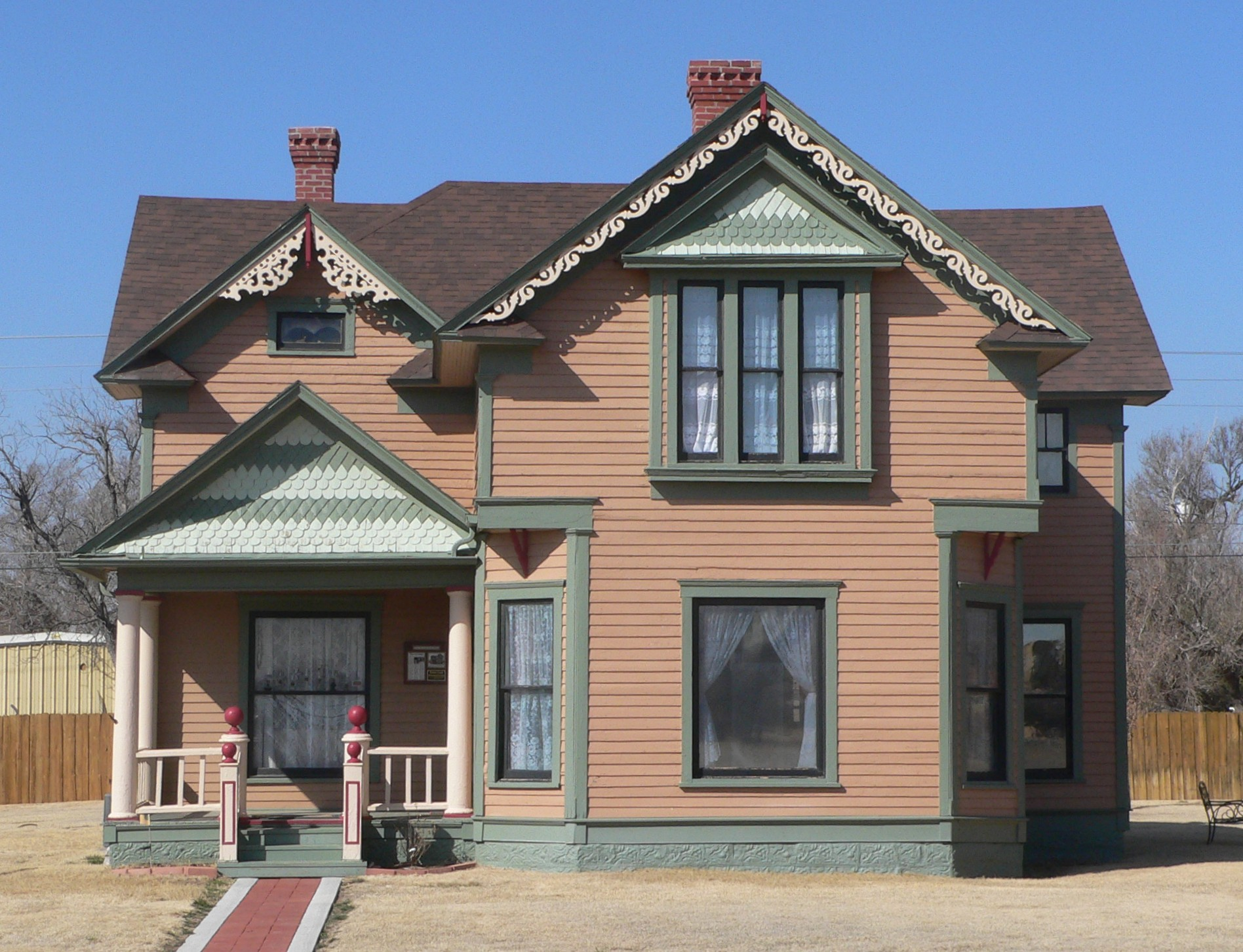

- Location within Kansas Location within the United States
- Location: 112 N. 3rd St., Leoti, Kansas
- Coordinates: 38.482238°N 101.360012°W
- Area: less than one acre
- Built: 1892
- Architectural style: Queen Anne
- NRHP reference No.: 14000351
- Added to NRHP: June 27, 2014

The William B. and Julia Washington House, at 112 N. 3rd St. in Leoti in Wichita County, Kansas. It was completed in 1892. It was listed on the National Register of Historic Places in 2014.

It was deemed to be a "late Victorian-era Queen Anne-style house with Free Classic elements" and "one of the best remaining examples of this style in Wichita County."

It is a museum of the Wichita County Historical Society.

It is associated with the Museum of the Great Plains (Wichita County, Kansas).
