= Tornado outbreak of March 11–13, 1990 =

1990 tornado outbreak in the United States

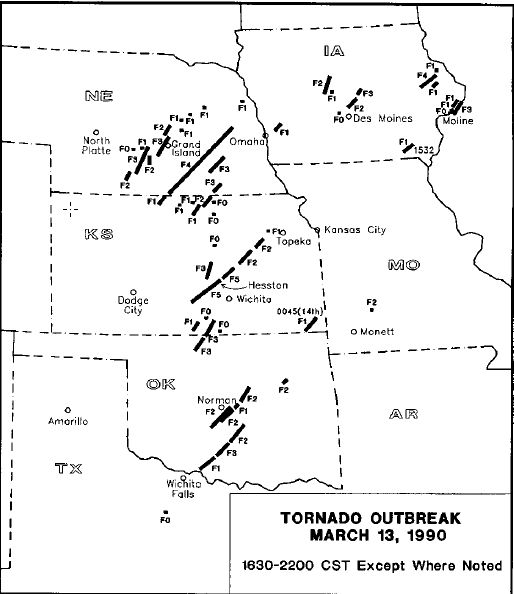
- Map of confirmed tornadoes in the outbreak

Meteorological history
- Duration: March 11–13, 1990

Tornado outbreak
- Tornadoes: 64 (confirmed)
- Max. rating: F5 tornado
- Highest winds: 300–350 mph (480–560 km/h)

Overall effects
- Fatalities: 2 fatalities ≥89 injuries
- Damage: $543.4 million (1990 USD) $1.3 billion (2024 USD)
- Areas affected: Midwestern United States, United States Great Plains
- Part of the tornado outbreaks of 1990

The March 1990 Central United States tornado outbreak was a tornado outbreak that affected portions of the United States Great Plains and Midwest regions from Iowa to Texas from March 11 to March 13, 1990. The outbreak produced at least 64 tornadoes across the region, including four violent tornadoes; two tornadoes, which touched down north and west of Wichita, Kansas, were both rated F5, including the tornado that struck Hesston. In Nebraska, several strong tornadoes touched down across the southern and central portion of the state, including an F4 tornado (possibly a family of tornadoes) that traveled for 131 miles (211 km) making it the longest tracked tornado in the outbreak. Two people were killed in the outbreak, one each by the two F5 tornadoes in Kansas.

== Overview ==
On March 12, upper-air maps indicated a high-pressure area situated over the Southeastern United States and a closed low-pressure area and accompanied trough entrenched across western portions of the country. Southwesterly flow across the Rocky Mountains proved favorable for low-level lee cyclogenesis, and surface analyses late on March 12 depicted the formation of a 1,004 millibars (29.65 inHg) low-pressure area over eastern Colorado. In the lower levels of the atmosphere, a low-level jet stretching from southern Texas into Iowa invigorated the northward transport of moisture from the Gulf of Mexico. The moisture became entrenched in the warm sector of the low-pressure area, to the east of a well-defined dryline extending from western Kansas into western Texas. Overnight on March 12 into the morning hours of March 13, widespread convection developed across Oklahoma and progressed northeastward into Kansas and Iowa, to the south of a quasi-stationary weather front, leaving a distinct outflow boundary across central and eastern Kansas. Early on March 13, morning atmospheric soundings across the Great Plains indicated an increasingly volatile atmosphere, with warming surface temperatures, strengthening low-level wind fields, and veering winds aloft. A modified atmospheric profile near Hesston, Kansas, indicated convective available potential energy around 3,200 J/kg already in place at 12:00 UTC. In general, weather researchers remarked that the overarching pattern on March 13, 1990, was a synoptically evident pattern reminiscent of past tornado outbreaks. The National Severe Storms Forecast Center – known in modern times as the Storm Prediction Center – responded to this pattern by issuing a broad Moderate risk for severe weather across a wide swath of the Great Plains.

As the trough continued its approach from the west, upper-air plots showed enhanced diffluence focused across much of the region. Into the afternoon hours, the surface low deepened to 996 millibars (29.41 inHg) as it progressed into western Kansas and the Oklahoma panhandle. The increasing atmospheric pressure gradient associated with this feature continued to enhance convergence along the dryline, while the influence of warm daytime temperatures exceeding 70 °F (21 °C) pushed the dryline eastward into western Oklahoma. Continued southwesterly flow around the mid-level low over Utah, Wyoming, and Colorado advected cold mid-level temperatures northeastward toward Kansas, Oklahoma, and Texas. Steep mid-level lapse rates further contributed to destabilization of the atmosphere, while moisture content and vertical wind profiles continued to improve. Low-level winds out of the southeast by the evening of March 13 further contributed to convergence along the dryline, which would become the focal point for several tornadic supercells over the ensuing hours as mid-level winds near 100 knots (120 mph; 190 km/h) intersected the region. Additional supercells developed along the outflow boundary in Kansas, notably the Hesston tornado family. Alongside the tornado outbreak in the warm sector of the low-pressure area, seasonally cold air on the backside of the low contributed to severe wintry weather, with snowfall up to 8 inches (200 mm) and blizzard-like conditions reported across the Nebraska panhandle.

== Confirmed tornadoes ==
Confirmed tornadoes by Fujita rating
FU	F0	F1	F2	F3	F4	F5	Total
0	12	25	13	10	2	2	64

(based on NOAA Storm Data)

=== March 11 event ===
F#	Location	County	Time (UTC)	Path length	Damage
Kansas
F0	N of Plevna	Reno	2300	0.1 miles (160 m)	
F1	Alder to S of Geneseo	Rice	2315	14 miles (23 km)	
Sources: NOAA Storm Data Tornado History Project - Storm Data, March 11, 1990

=== March 12 event ===
F#	Location	County	Time (UTC)	Path length	Damage
Iowa
F0	NW of Sawyer	Lee	0440	0.2 miles (0.32 km)	
Kansas
F1	SE of Topeka	Shawnee, Douglas	0549	5 miles (8.0 km)	Rated F2 by Grazulis.
F1	W of McClouth	Jefferson	0610	3 miles (4.8 km)	
Sources: NOAA Storm Data Tornado History Project - Storm Data - March 12, 1990

=== March 13 event ===
F#	Location	County	Time (UTC)	Path length	Damage
Kansas
F1	NW of Jetmore	Hodgeman	0836	1 mile (1.6 km)	
F5	Castleton to Hesston	Reno, Harvey, McPherson	2234	48 miles (77 km)	1 death - See section on this tornado
F1	E of Thornburg	Smith	2248	13 miles (21 km)	
F1	NE of Esbon	Jewell	2300	1.5 miles (2.4 km)	
F5	Goessel to NE of Hillsboro	Harvey, McPherson, Marion	2330	22.0 miles (35.4 km)	1 death - See section on this tornado
F0	SW of Portland	Sumner	0004	0.1 miles (160 m)	
F0	N of Conway Springs	Sumner	0012	0.1 miles (160 m)	
F2	W of Pilsen to NW of Volland	Marion, Morris, Geary, Wabaunsee	0015	55 miles (89 km)	See section on this tornado
F1	SW of Webber	Jewell	0020	5 miles (8.0 km)	
F1	S of Danville	Harper	0035	12 miles (19 km)	
F1	E of Randall	Jewell, Cloud, Republic	0045	13 miles (21 km)	
F3	W of Moundridge	Reno, Harvey, McPherson	0055	18 miles (29 km)	A farm and three homes were destroyed. Caused $275,000 in damage.
F2	W of Belleville	Republic	0100	15 miles (24 km)	Several farmhouses sustained extensive damage.
F0	S of Belleville	Republic	0116	0.5 miles (0.80 km)	
F0	Salina	Saline	0150	0.2 miles (320 m)	
F1	E of Wamego	Pottawatomie	0203	2 miles (3.2 km)	
F0	S of Concordia	Cloud	0240	0.2 miles (320 m)	
F1	S of Chetopa	Labette	0645	2 miles (3.2 km)	
Iowa
F1	N of Stiles to SE of Floris	Davis	2132	14 miles (23 km)	
F0	Bettendorf area	Scott	2231	0.3 miles (480 m)	
F0	E of LeClaire	Scott	2242	0.2 miles (320 m)	
F3	E of LeClaire to SE of Albany, IL	Scott, Rock Island (IL), Whiteside (IL)	2245	15.5 miles (24.9 km)	Multiple-vortex tornado caused major damage in the Cordova and Port Byron areas. 12 homes were heavily damaged or destroyed, and 26 others sustained lesser damage. One man broke his leg when he was blown off of a scaffold at Cordova Nuclear Plant.
F4	Prairieburg to Worthington	Linn, Jones, Delaware, Dubuque	2253	19 miles (31 km)	See section on this tornado — In Worthington, 39 homes and businesses were damaged or destroyed. 13 farms were destroyed as well. Tornado was a half-mile wide at times.
F1	NE of LeClaire	Scott, Clinton	2242	13 miles (21 km)	
F1	Monticello area	Jones	2308	6 miles (9.7 km)	
F1	NE of Crescent	Pottawattamie	2242	8 miles (13 km)	
F1	S of Holy Cross	Dubuque	2355	3 miles (4.8 km)	
F0	NE of Ortonville	Dallas	0120	0.1 miles (160 m)	
F2	Ogden to E of Stanhope	Boone, Hamilton	0125	22 miles (35 km)	Tornado killed livestock and destroyed several outbuildings. Caused $616,000 in damage.
F1	E of Ridgeport	Boone	0135	1 mile (1.6 km)	
F2	Ankeny to S of Maxwell	Polk, Story	0155	15 miles (24 km)	Rain-wrapped tornado severely damaged 20 homes in Ankeny, with 16 others sustaining lesser damage. A condominium lost part of its roof, which was thrown onto I-35, resulting in a major car accident. At least a dozen other cars were blown off of the interstate by the tornado. Caused $2,000,000 in damage and injured 15 people.
F3	E of Fernald	Story	0236	9 miles (14 km)	A tractor-trailer was lifted and thrown into a ditch, injuring the driver. Multiple buildings were damaged or destroyed at a farm as well. Rated F2 by Grazulis.
Oklahoma
F2	NW of Bradley to E of Norman	Grady, McClain, Cleveland	2244	28 miles (45 km)	Two mobile homes were destroyed and frame homes were damaged near the beginning of the path. The tornado crossed into McClain County and destroyed eight additional mobile homes before clipping the north side of Washington, destroying a trailer and the second story of a house. The tornado then struck Noble before dissipating. In Noble, multiple homes sustained roof and structural damage, and an apartment building lost part of its roof. Tractor-trailers and a mobile home were overturned. The high school lost its press box, scoreboard, and several light poles. One person was injured.
F3	SE of Hawley to NE of Wakita	Grant	2315	19 miles (31 km)	One house sustained major damage and another lost its roof.
F2	W of Criner to W of Slaughterville	McClain, Cleveland	2331	18 miles (29 km)	Trailers and outbuildings were damaged and many trees were uprooted. Rated F1 by Grazulis.
F1	NE of Norman	Cleveland	2353	5 miles (8.0 km)	
F3	NE of Wakita to SW of Mayfield, KS	Grant, Sumner (KS)	2354	22 miles (35 km)	Caused tree damage in Oklahoma before crossing into Kansas, where five homes were damaged.
F2	SW of Stella to SE of Jacktown	Cleveland, Pottawatomie, Lincoln	2359	19 miles (31 km)	At the beginning of the path, a mobile home was destroyed in Stella, resulting in a serious injury. A barn was destroyed, a house was unroofed, and three trailers were damaged elsewhere along the path. A mobile home was destroyed near Meeker before the tornado dissipated.
F1	W of Waurika to SW of Loco	Jefferson, Stephens	0001	21 miles (34 km)	
F3	SW of Loco to NW of Alpers	Jefferson, Stephens, Carter, Garvin	0058	22 miles (35 km)	Tornado caused major damage in and around Ratliff City. Five mobile homes were destroyed and a motor home was rolled 100 feet. A five-ton crane was blown over, several vehicles were damaged, and debris was found up to a mile away. Caused $750,000 in damage and injured one person.
F2	NE of Tatums to NE of Paul's Valley	Garvin	0150	28 miles (45 km)	In Pauls Valley, a farm implement company had its roof torn off, and a civic club building lost part of its roof. Barns were destroyed outside of town as well.
F2	NE of Edna	Creek, Okmulgee	0210	9 miles (14 km)	Several barns were destroyed and 14 power poles were snapped. Caused $75,000 in damage.
Nebraska
F1	NW of Shelton	Buffalo	2245	1 mile (1.6 km)	
F3	NW of Minden to S of Cairo	Kearney, Buffalo, Hall	2300	32 miles (51 km)	Numerous outbuildings were destroyed, trees were uprooted, and a county bridge was destroyed. Five farmsteads were heavily damaged as well.
F4	S of Red Cloud to E of Schuyler	Webster, Nuckolls, Clay, Fillmore, York, Seward, Butler, Colfax	2305	131 miles (211 km)	This was either an extremely long-tracked tornado or a tornado family. Near Red Cloud, a farmhouse was completely "wiped out". The tornado moved into Nuckolls County and struck Lawrence, where 8 homes were destroyed and 45 others were damaged. Crossing into Clay County, the tornado struck Sutton, where one business was destroyed and 11 others were damaged. 49 homes in Sutton were damaged, and a truck and a police car were flipped. 20 farms were damaged in rural areas nearby. The tornado downed trees and power lines in Fillmore County before crossing into York County. A farmhouse was destroyed near McCool Junction. South of York, the tornado destroyed another farmhouse, heavily damaged a gas station and convenience store, tore the roof off of a motel, and destroyed two trucks. A dozen farms were damaged in York County, and about 10,000 geese were killed. 57 railroad cars were derailed near Waco before the tornado crossed into Seward County, where trees and power lines were damaged. The tornado then crossed into Butler County and passed near David City, impacting numerous farmsteads. 35 homes and 155 other structures were damaged or destroyed near David City, and about 1,200 livestock were killed or injured. The tornado then moved into Colfax County, damaging four farms near Schuyler before dissipating. A total of nine people were injured.
F2	E of Sacramento	Kearney	2320	8 miles (13 km)	Several farms sustained extensive damage with livestock killed, and outbuildings and irrigation pivots destroyed.
F2	S of Wood River	Adams, Hall	2325	9 miles (14 km)	Two farms were hit, with a farmhouse sustaining extensive damage at one of them. Outbuildings, grain bins, and two barns were destroyed.
F0	N of Kearney	Buffalo	2335	0.1 miles (160 m)	
F3	N of Alda to NW of Archer	Hall, Howard, Merrick	2344	27 miles (43 km)	Five mobile homes were destroyed, and other homes sustained minor damage. 15 train cars were derailed near an Army Ordnance Plant, and 47 others were derailed near Grand Island. Several farms were damaged, some extensively with loss of cattle.
F2	W of Fullerton	Merrick, Nance	0023	13 miles (21 km)	Ten farms were damaged, with farmhouses damaged at four of them.
F1	NE of Boone	Boone	0025	1.5 miles (2.4 km)	
F1	SE of Fullerton	Nance	0030	2 miles (3.2 km)	
F1	Newman Grove area	Madison	0045	0.2 miles (320 m)	
F1	SE of Battle Creek	Madison	0130	0.6 miles (0.97 km)	
F3	N of Carleton to SE of Exeter	Thayer, Fillmore	0145	25 miles (40 km)	A large hog facility and outbuildings were destroyed. A mobile home was destroyed as well. Rated F2 by Grazulis.
F3	NE of Chester	Thayer	0145	13 miles (21 km)	Tornado clipped Chester, where trees, outbuildings and propane tanks were damaged. Several farmsteads were damaged outside of town as well. Rated F2 by Grazulis.
F1	N of Bancroft	Thurston	0401	1.5 miles (2.4 km)	
Texas
F0	NE of Lusk	Throckmorton	2330	0.2 miles (320 m)	
Missouri
F2	SE of Pleasant Hope	Polk	0330	2 miles (3.2 km)	Five homes and 16 barns were damaged.
Sources: NOAA Storm Data Tornado History Project Storm Data - March 13, 1990

=== Hesston–Goessel, Kansas tornado family ===
Hesston–Goessel, Kansas
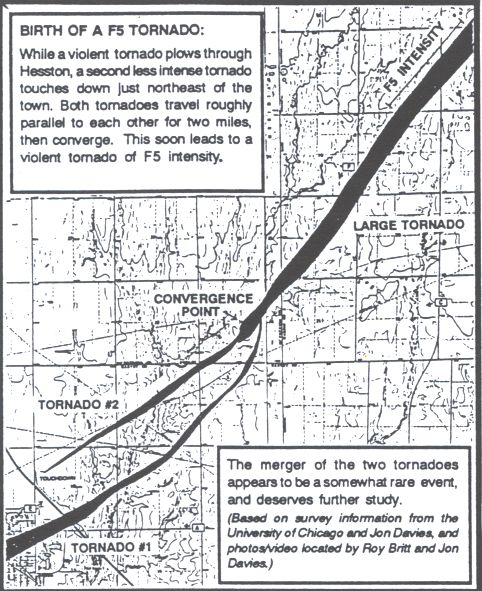
- Clockwise from top: A video still showing the weakening Hesston tornado (left) and the strengthening Goessel tornado (right) shortly before preforming a tornado hand-off north of Hesston –A reconstructed path map, showing the rapid cycle of the supercell that produced the Hesston and Goessel tornadoes – An aerial photograph of Hesston, Kansas following the Hesston tornado

Meteorological history
- Formed: March 13, 1990, 4:34 p.m. CST (UTC–06:00)
- Dissipated: March 13, 1990, 8:03 p.m. CST (UTC–06:00)
- Duration: 3 hours, 29 minutes

Tornado family
- Tornadoes: 4
- Max. rating: F5 tornado
- Highest winds: 300–350 mph (480–560 km/h)

Overall effects
- Fatalities: 2
- Injuries: ≥59
- Damage: Unknown
- Areas affected: Central Kansas
- Part of the Tornadoes of 1990

Around 4:30 p.m the first of two F5 tornadoes that struck Hesston and Goessel touched down. They were both spawned by the same supercell thunderstorm, and were part of what is known as a tornado family; a family that included several additional touchdowns after the Goessel storm dissipated.

The first tornado of the Hesston storm touched down at approximately 4:34 p.m. CDT just to the northeast of Pretty Prairie. The damage path ranged between 1/2 and 3/4 miles wide near Haven, and several homes were completely demolished indicating F4 damage. Had the tornado moved through a more populated area in this stage of its life, it is likely that it would have caused much more dramatic damage.

Northeast of the Little Arkansas River, the track abruptly decreased in width from 0.5 miles (0.80 km) to just over 300 yards (270 m). The tornado plowed into the town of Hesston, just northwest of Newton on I-135. A total of 226 homes and 21 businesses were destroyed, and several were swept completely from their foundations with only slabs and empty basements remaining. Portions of the damage path in Hesston were rated F5. One person died and 59 people were injured.

The series of events that occurred as the tornado moved past the Hesston area were most interesting. Eyewitness accounts observed the touchdown of an additional tornado just to the north. This is consistent with models of what is known as a "tornado handoff", in which an old mesocyclone and tornado occlude as a new mesocyclone and tornado further downwind becomes dominant. Over the course of a few miles, the new tornado intensified and the original one abruptly constricted and apparently became a satellite tornado to the new tornado. Eventually, the Hesston tornado (after traveling nearly 48 miles (77 km)) occluded and merged with the new tornado, and the supercell began to re-intensify. The new tornado rapidly became very large, and violent damage was produced by the second tornado in Marion County. Several homes were again obliterated and completely swept away. An elderly woman was killed when the tornado cleanly swept away her army barracks that was converted into a home, but without a basement. The tornado produced very severe cycloidal ground scouring in farm fields, and damage near the town of Goessel was "extreme F5" according to NWS damage surveyors. The severity of the damage left behind by this tornado led some meteorologists to believe that the Goessel tornado was among the strongest ever documented at that time. The storm passed Goessel, clipped the northwestern portion of Hillsboro, then dissipated just NE of Risley, approximately 22 miles (35 km) from its genesis.

The same supercell would produce another long-tracked F2 tornado that damaged many farms and destroyed four homes on the southern side of Dwight, as well as a short-lived F1 tornado that formed southwest of Belvue

=== Prairieburg–Hopkinton–Worthington, Iowa ===
Prairieburg–Hopkinton–Worthington, Iowa
- Top: A photograph of the Worthington tornado; Bottom: Extensive damage caused to a frame residence by the Worthington tornado

Meteorological history
- Formed: March 13, 1990, 4:53 p.m. CST (UTC–06:00)
- Dissipated: March 13, 1990, 5:25 p.m. CST (UTC–06:00)
- Duration: 32 minutes

F4 tornado
- on the Fujita scale
- Max width: 0.5 mi (0.80 km)
- Path length: 19.0 mi (30.6 km)
- Highest winds: 207–260 mph (333–418 km/h)

Overall effects
- Fatalities: 0
- Injuries: 0
- Damage: $7 million (1990 USD)
- Areas affected: Prairieburg, Hopkinton, and Worthington, Iowa
- Part of the Tornadoes of 1990

As the Hesston–Goessel tornado family was in progress, a rotating storm system spawned a slender but intense tornado to the west of Dubuque, Iowa. This tornado, most commonly known as the Worthington tornado, initially formed around 4:53 p.m. CST, to the southeast of Prairireburg, a farming hamlet in Linn County, Iowa. The tornado quickly proceeded to the northeast, straddling the line between the unincorporated communities of Argand and Castle Grove in Jones County. Near these two communities, a farm was significantly damaged, with trees uprooted and overturned on the property. Throughout rural Jones and Delaware counties, at least 13 separate farms were damaged or destroyed by the tornado; 1 of which reported over $1 million (1990 USD) in damage costs. Several cars were tossed and ruined, and the St. Peter and Paul Lutheran Church was obliterated west of Monticello. Prior to entering Dubuque County, the tornado was estimated at 0.5 mi (0.80 km) wide.

Immediately after crossing into Dubuque County, the tornado struck the town of Worthington, a community of just over 400 at the time of the tornado. The tornado had reduced its size considerably, with its most damaging winds covering only about the width of two blocks. In Worthington, the tornado damaged or destroyed at least 39 structures — some homes, and others, businesses — in addition to 30 cars. One car was thrown into the basement of a completely swept home, barely missing a family that was sheltering there. The tornado wiped out all electrical and communication lines and left 40 homeless in Worthington.

Following the Worthington tornado, several hundreds of community members participated in the cleanup efforts, especially in Worthington, which was the hardest-hit area. The Red Cross, the National Guard, volunteer firefighters, and civil defense groups also assisted with cleanup and rescue. Some victims were consoled by priests and other members of the clergy in Worthington. Various witnesses reported hearing a "freight train" sound coming from the Worthington tornado, and damaging pea-sized and golf ball-sized hail also accompanied the tornado. Despite the extreme damage, no injuries or deaths were reported. Rain, wind, and snow in the following days hindered cleanup operations, but they quickly resumed.

== See also ==
- List of North American tornadoes and tornado outbreaks
