= Cheney High School =

Cheney High School may refer to:

- Cheney High School (Kansas), in Cheney, Kansas
- Cheney High School (Washington), in Spokane County, Washington

== See also ==
- Chaney High School in Youngstown, Ohio
