= 1990 Bakersfield Valley tornado =

Destructive F4 tornado in rural Pecos County, Texas

- Clockwise from top: A photograph of the tornado receding into its storm system as seen from U.S. 190, northwest of Iraan, Texas; A diagram of the Bakersfield Valley tornado's damage path, with specific points of damage labeled; NWS Midland, Texas radar imagery of the storm system that produced the Bakersfield Valley tornado, as the tornado was in progress

Meteorological history
- Formed: June 1, 1990; 5:20 p.m. CDT (UTC–05:00)
- Dissipated: June 1, 1990; 6:30 p.m. CDT (UTC–05:00)
- Duration: 1 hour, 10 minutes

F4 tornado
- on the Fujita scale
- Max width: 1.3 mi (2.1 km)
- Path length: 22 mi (35 km)
- Highest winds: 207–260 mph (333–418 km/h)

Overall effects
- Fatalities: 2
- Injuries: 21
- Damage: $30–40 million (1990 USD)
- Areas affected: Pecos County, Texas
- Part of the Tornadoes of 1990

In the evening hours of June 1, 1990, a potent and fatal tornado struck portions of eastern Pecos County, located in the U.S. state of Texas. This tornado, commonly referred to as the Bakersfield Valley tornado, produced a damage path approximately 22 mi (35 km) long, extending from south of McCamey in Upton County (Note: The entire path of the Bakersfield Valley tornado was in Pecos County. McCamey, which is in a different county, serves as a reference point for where the tornado formed.) to Iraan in Pecos County. The Bakersfield Valley tornado caused an estimated $30–40 million (1990 USD) in damages and reached a maximum width of 1.3 mi (2.1 km). Two motorists were killed and several others were injured.

Numerous oil fields were impacted by the tornado, and pumpjacks and other equipment sustained uprooting, overturning, or even deformation. The Bakersfield Valley tornado also damaged or destroyed multiple permanent homes, mobile homes, and outbuildings in the rural areas of Bakersfield, wiped fields clean of mesquite and greasewood trees in several areas, and exhibited multiple instances of heavy object displacement. The nature of this object displacement, as well as the internal structure of the tornado and the environmental conditions that contributed to its formation, have been subjects of extensive analysis by experts.

The Bakersfield Valley tornado remains one of only a handful of violent (F4+) tornadoes to occur in the West Texas region, with surveyors remarking that this tornado was likely the largest and highest-magnitude tornado to strike the region since the 1970 Lubbock tornado. It is one of only two violent tornadoes to occur in the Pecos Valley region since official records began in 1950, and the last F4 tornado to strike Texas since a short-lived and fatal tornado that struck Saragosa three years earlier.

== Meteorological synopsis ==
=== Episode narrative ===
==== Morning observations ====
By the morning of June 1, 1990, at around 7:00 a.m. CDT, observed conditions for convection and severe weather were already beginning to assemble over West Texas. Atmospheric analysis revealed that a low-level jet with a southerly flow of around 20 m s⁻¹ (45 mph) was centered over the area, with a large pocket of dry air surging into the area at the 700-millibar level. An intense low-pressure system was centered over Idaho, with multiple shortwave troughs (disturbances) moving around the low at 500 mb. Diffluent air existed over West Texas at the 200-millibar level, with a jet streak (Note: A jet streak is a faster-moving current of air embedded in a jet stream.) approaching the region. Atmospheric soundings also confirmed the possibility of severe weather, as the Midland–Odessa weather station revealed the presence of a low-lying layer of moisture, with a layer of drier air above in the mid-levels of the atmosphere. Though winds in the lowest 3 km of the atmosphere were not strong, less than 15 m s⁻¹ (34 mph) at most, the winds in this layer were veering more than 90 degrees, indicating very robust rotation. The weather station in El Paso, Texas also observed a layer of dry air and westerly to southwesterly winds at every level of the atmosphere.

==== Mesoscale convective system interactions ====
Surface analysis at 4:00 p.m. CDT (2100 UTC), showing a dry line progressing over West Texas interacting with an outflow boundary

Because the conditions in West Texas and the surrounding areas were supportive of convection, multiple storms fired near Childress, Texas, in the southeastern Texas Panhandle, eventually forming into a mesoscale convective system. This system moved in a southeasterly direction over the course of several hours, leaving a cool, stable outflow boundary as it moved through West Texas. As this was occurring, a pronounced dry line moved over West Texas, with moisture in the lowest levels of the atmosphere becoming very well-mixed to the west of the dry line. Had the mesoscale convective system not occurred and created an outflow boundary, West Texas would likely have not seen severe weather. However, this outflow boundary caused instability to be focused along the dry line that was moving to the east, resulting in strong storms.

=== Event narrative ===
In West Texas, convection and low-lying radar echoes were first observed around 2:00 p.m. By 3:15 p.m., a supercell had developed in southwestern Crane County, where it produced a tornado approximately 8 mi (13 km) to the west of Crane, Texas. Several cells developed south of the previous one, between McCamey and Grandfalls, one of which would be responsible for producing the Bakersfield Valley tornado. By 4:30 p.m., the Bakersfield Valley cell had acquired many characteristics on radar that are associated with supercellular storms, including a tight reflectivity gradient in the lowest levels of the atmosphere and a distinct inward curve on the south side of the cell. A pronounced hook echo was also seen at this time, over Girvin in Pecos County. By 5:30, the Bakersfield Valley cell had taken on a high-precipitation radar appearance, and still had a defined hook echo and "kidney bean-shaped appearance". The tornado was in progress at the time that this scan was made. By the next radar scan, the cell that produced the Bakersfield Valley tornado had lost many of its characteristics. The supercell continued to produce hail as it moved roughly eastward, but no more tornadoes were reported.

== Tornado summary ==
F3 damage to the Foster residence, where four occupants sheltered and survived

=== Formation, initial damage, and impact on the Foster home ===
The Bakersfield Valley tornado officially made contact with the ground at 5:20 p.m. CDT, an estimated 9 mi (14 km) south of McCamey, Texas. Much of its initial damage path was marked by sporadic F0 damage to lightweight poles and small structures. However, by the time that the tornado had been on the ground for 5 minutes, it began to increase significantly in both size and intensity. Roughly 2 mi (3.2 km) to the west of Farm and Market Road 1901 (FM 1901 for brevity), the tornado struck a pair of empty 500-barrel oil tanks, carrying them for 50 ft (15 m) to the northeast and 0.5 mi (0.80 km) to the north, respectively. Several ranch outbuildings were destroyed in this area, as well. The tornado then struck a farm co-op building, which was relatively lightweight and "of corrugated metal and I-beam construction", significantly damaging its frame at F3 intensity. Vegetation scouring was also noted at this site. This co-op site marked the starting point of a 0.5 by 8-mile (0.8 by 14-kilometer) area of the tornado's path in which all standing vegetation, including grass, mesquite trees, and greasewood trees, was completely removed by the winds and debris impact of the tornado. In this section of extreme vegetation damage, along Co-op Road, the tornado struck the Foster residence, which was a 5-year-old structure made of brick. A barn and workshop of corrugated metal construction were also present on site. The tornado severely damaged the Foster home and workshop at estimated F3 intensity, but the barn was nearly unscathed. Extensive vegetation removal remained apparent at this location. Due to the visibility of the tornado at this point, the Fosters had time to seek shelter in the interior portion of their home; all four escaped with only minor injuries as the tornado directly struck their property.

=== Intensification ===
Around 1 mi (1.6 km) south of the Foster residence sat the McKenzie residence, which was the next substantial structure in the path of the tornado. This residence was described by surveyors as a "3-year-old, two-story, well-engineered home of solid abode brick construction." The structure was destroyed at F4 intensity, with only the staircase and some cabinets at the northeast corner of the first floor remaining. Some papers from within the home were recovered near Big Lake, Texas, which is approximately 55 mi (89 km) to the east-northeast of the Bakersfield Valley area, and the commode of the home was found around 3 mi (4.8 km) away. Similarly to the Fosters, the McKenzies sought shelter in the interior portion of their home, all surviving with minor injuries. 2 mi (3.2 km) to the east of this residence, the Bakersfield Valley tornado removed a 300 ft (91 m) section of pavement from Co-op Road, which the tornado had been paralleling for much of its life. Extreme vegetation damage was also observed in this area. Damage along this section of Co-op Road was assigned an F4 rating, based on a combination of the asphalt removal and the damage to vegetation. Though pavement stripping can be influenced by several other factors besides a tornado's winds, such as the quality and thickness of the asphalt itself, surveyors determined that such a large section of pavement being removed was suggestive of a violent (F4+) tornado. 1 mi (1.6 km) further to the east, two smaller patches of asphalt were removed from Co-op Road.

=== Fatalities, re-intensification, and dissipation ===
The trajectory of one of the full, 500-barrel oil tanks can be seen as the "light" swath extending from the bottom-right of the photograph to the top.

The tornado exhibited a weakening trend as it approached the intersection of Co-op Road and FM 305. Near this intersection, along Co-op Road, a truck was blown approximately 150 ft (46 m) off of the road, killing the occupant. The tornado continued to the southeast and became increasingly rain-wrapped, crossing the intersection of the two roads at 6:00 p.m. Another motor vehicle with a family inside was struck on FM 305, with the vehicle being tossed 500 ft (150 m) away. The father was killed, marking the second and final fatality from the tornado. Following this, the tornado re-intensified greatly, impacting another oil field off of FM 305. Three full, 500-barrel oil tanks, all weighing an estimated 140,000 lb (64,000 kg), or 70 U.S. tons each, were ripped from a tank battery and carried 3 mi (4.8 km) across a field. Suction marks from the tornado were found near the battery. Two of these tanks were pushed 600 ft (180 m) onto a hillside with a 40-degree incline, but the third was rolled bodily up this incline, where it was recovered at the crest of the hill. This object displacement was rated F4 by surveyors. From 6:15 p.m. until its dissipation at 6:30, the Bakersfield Valley tornado moved through rural Pecos County, striking the Kimbrough residence at F3 intensity in the process. The home was carried for 30 ft (9.1 m) and deposited by the tornado. Passing U.S. 190, the tornado struck the Yates Oil Field, damaging or destroying a total of 57 oil pumps and wrecking other oil field equipment. The tornado dissipated 5 mi (8.0 km) west-southwest of Iraan.

== Aftermath ==
=== Immediate aftermath ===
==== Observations and initial response ====
Robert Musick's vehicle. Damage to this vehicle was rated F2.

Initial publications following the Bakersfield Valley tornado reported that one was killed and "several" were injured; however, when further information was made available on the tornado, these values were revised to two fatalities and 21 injuries. Both fatalities occurred in motor vehicles near the intersection of Co-op Road and FM 305 as described in the summary above. It is suspected that the rain-wrapped nature of the tornado by the time it reached this intersection may have contributed to these deaths, as the tornado was difficult to distinguish from the approaching wall of precipitation. Otherwise, surveyors and experts remark that "People who found themselves in or near the tornado's path generally employed proper protective measures." These protective measures were taken by those in the tornado's path as a result of multiple public preparedness programs issued by the National Weather Service, and likely contributed to the low casualty toll of the tornado.

Many of the injuries resulted from car crashes caused by the tornado; two of the injured were state troopers caught directly in the core of the tornado, where their vehicle was rotated around and sustained blown out windows. Several livestock were also killed by the tornado and were scattered along the general path. At the property of Mickey and Roy Neal McKenzie, 30 goats were lost to the tornado. The Pool family lost 123 sheep in the immediate aftermath of the tornado, with several others dying later from injuries. Three horses, seven stock trailers, and two camper trailers were also lost at this site. Surveyors at the National Weather Service offices in Midland, Texas and Lubbock, Texas postponed surveys of the Bakersfield Valley tornado's path until June 4–5, assuming that the tornado was weak and short-lived due to limited information. Odessa American news editor Debra A. Parker received an award after she won first place in "page one make-up" for her June 2–3 coverage of the immediate aftermath of the Bakersfield Valley tornado.

==== List of tornado victims ====
The following table provides information on the two fatalities:

| Name | Age | Gender | Location | Additional Information |
|---|---|---|---|---|
| Robert Musick | 70 | Male | Vehicle | Was traveling alone on Co-op Road, when his vehicle was tossed. Pronounced dead at scene. |
| Pat Dingler | Unknown | Male | Vehicle | Was traveling with his wife and sons, when his vehicle was displaced from FM 305. Pronounced dead at scene. |

=== Recovery efforts ===
==== Damage and resulting aid ====
Following the tornado, it was determined that 20 homes were damaged or destroyed, as many as 60 vehicles were destroyed, 85 oil field pump jacks were blown over or deformed (57 of which were in the Yates Oil Field, east of U.S. 190), and numerous other structures and fields of vegetation were swept. The response to the tornado's impact was swift, with volunteers from the Salvation Army and the Red Cross in Odessa, Texas providing aid and assistance to those left homeless by the tornado. Numerous people left homeless by the tornado momentarily relocated to a shelter set up by the First United Methodist Church in McCamey. Residents in the immediate area donated meals, hotel rooms, food, and jugs of water to workers and the afflicted. Access roads in the path of the tornado were blocked by downed power lines and utility poles, and numerous mobile homes along Co-op Road, as well as in other areas, were swept entirely with only their platforms remaining.

==== Greater impacts ====
The Bakersfield Valley tornado severely damaged the McCamey water supply, preventing water from being distributed to those in the greater McCamey–Iraan area. Residents were instructed to ration their water, as water would not be "coming from that field for a day and a half", according to Judge Jimmy McClure. However, the region had several other water sources in the case of an emergency. Some homes in McCamey were also momentarily without power, due to the tornado downing rows of power lines. Utility crews started working on restoring the power lines immediately after the tornado. Superintendent Johnny Farmer of West Texas Utilities Co. estimated that over 100 power lines were knocked over, cutting power to nearly every oil field in Crane and Upton Counties.

=== Comparisons to the Saragosa tornado ===
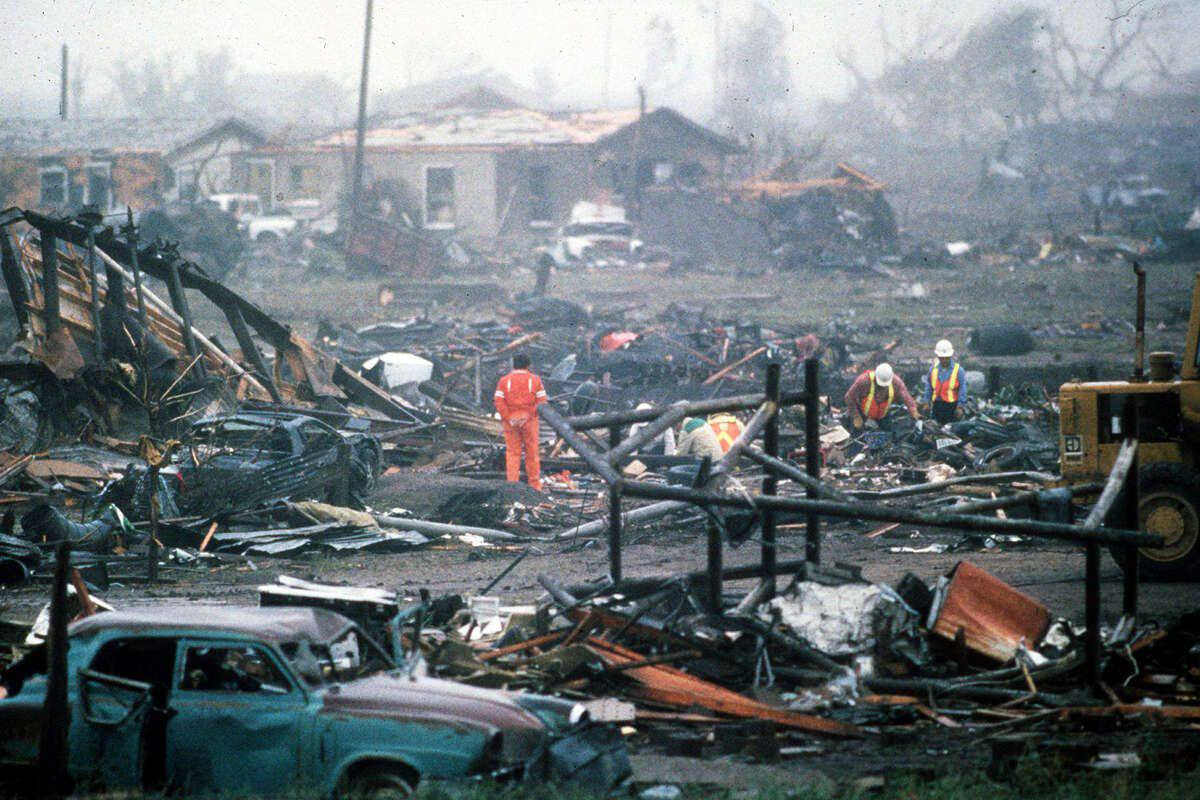
Severe damage in the center of Saragosa

Around three years prior to the Bakersfield Valley tornado, a short-lived F4 tornado struck Saragosa, Texas, on May 22, 1987, killing 30 and injuring numerous others. These two tornadoes are considered to be the only violent (F4+) tornadoes to occur in the Pecos Valley region since official records began in 1950, and because of this, several comparisons have been made between the Saragosa and Bakersfield Valley tornadoes, namely as relating to their impacts and intensities. The occurrence of the Bakersfield Valley caused some residents and witnesses to have vivid memories of the Saragosa tornado, connecting the two tragedies. Some instances of damage, such as the removal of large sections of asphalt and complete sweeping of vegetation, were seen in the Bakersfield Valley tornado but not in the Saragosa tornado. It was concluded from this that the Bakersfield Valley tornado may have at times been stronger than the Saragosa tornado, though there was not enough evidence to upgrade the tornado to an F5 rating. The Saragosa and Bakersfield Valley tornadoes remain intertwined in their impacts and the uniqueness of their intensities given their region.

== See also ==
- 1987 Saragosa tornado — The only other violent (F4+) tornado besides the Bakersfield Valley tornado to strike the Pecos Valley region, since official documentation began in 1950
- Jarrell tornado — Another fatal, slow-moving, and violent tornado that impacted Texas, less than seven years later
- Tornadoes of 1990
- List of F4, EF4, and IF4 tornadoes
