= Pretty Prairie USD 311 =

Public school district in Pretty Prairie, Kansas

Address
- 206 E. Main St. Pretty Prairie, Kansas, 67570; United States
- Coordinates: 37°46′52″N 98°1′1″W

District information
- Type: Public
- Grades: K to 12
- Schools: 3

Other information
- Website: usd311.com

Pretty Prairie USD 311 is a public unified school district headquartered in Pretty Prairie, Kansas, United States. The district includes the communities of Pretty Prairie, Castleton, and nearby rural areas.

== Schools ==
The school district operates the following schools:

- Pretty Prairie High School
- Pretty Prairie Middle School
- Pretty Prairie Grade School

== See also ==
- List of high schools in Kansas
- List of unified school districts in Kansas
