= Mount Vernon, Kansas =

Unincorporated community in Kingman County, Kansas

- Unincorporated community
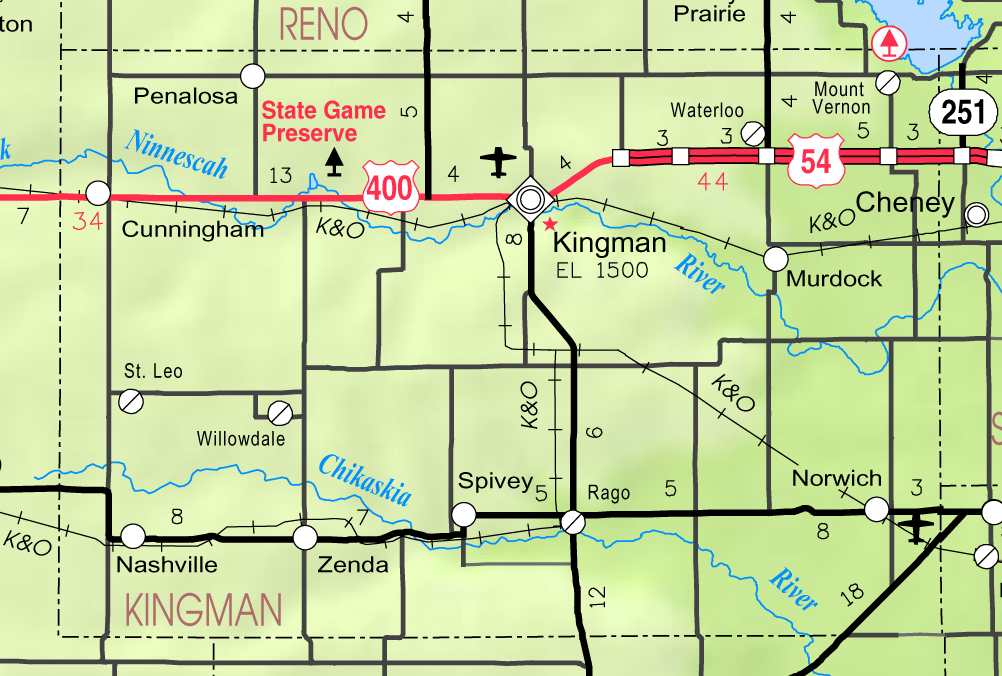
- KDOT map of Kingman County (legend)

- Location within Kansas Location within the United States
- Coordinates: 37°43′3″N 97°50′44″W
- Country: United States
- State: Kansas
- County: Kingman
- Township: Evan
- Elevation: 1,483 ft (452 m)
- Time zone: UTC-6 (CST)
  - Summer (DST): UTC-5 (CDT)
- Area code: 620
- FIPS code: 20-48975
- GNIS ID: 484666

Mount Vernon is an unincorporated community in Kingman County, Kansas, United States. It is located near the southwest side of the Cheney Reservoir dam.

== Education ==
The community is served by Cheney USD 268 public school district.
