= Cheney, Kansas =

City in Sedgwick County, Kansas, US

- City
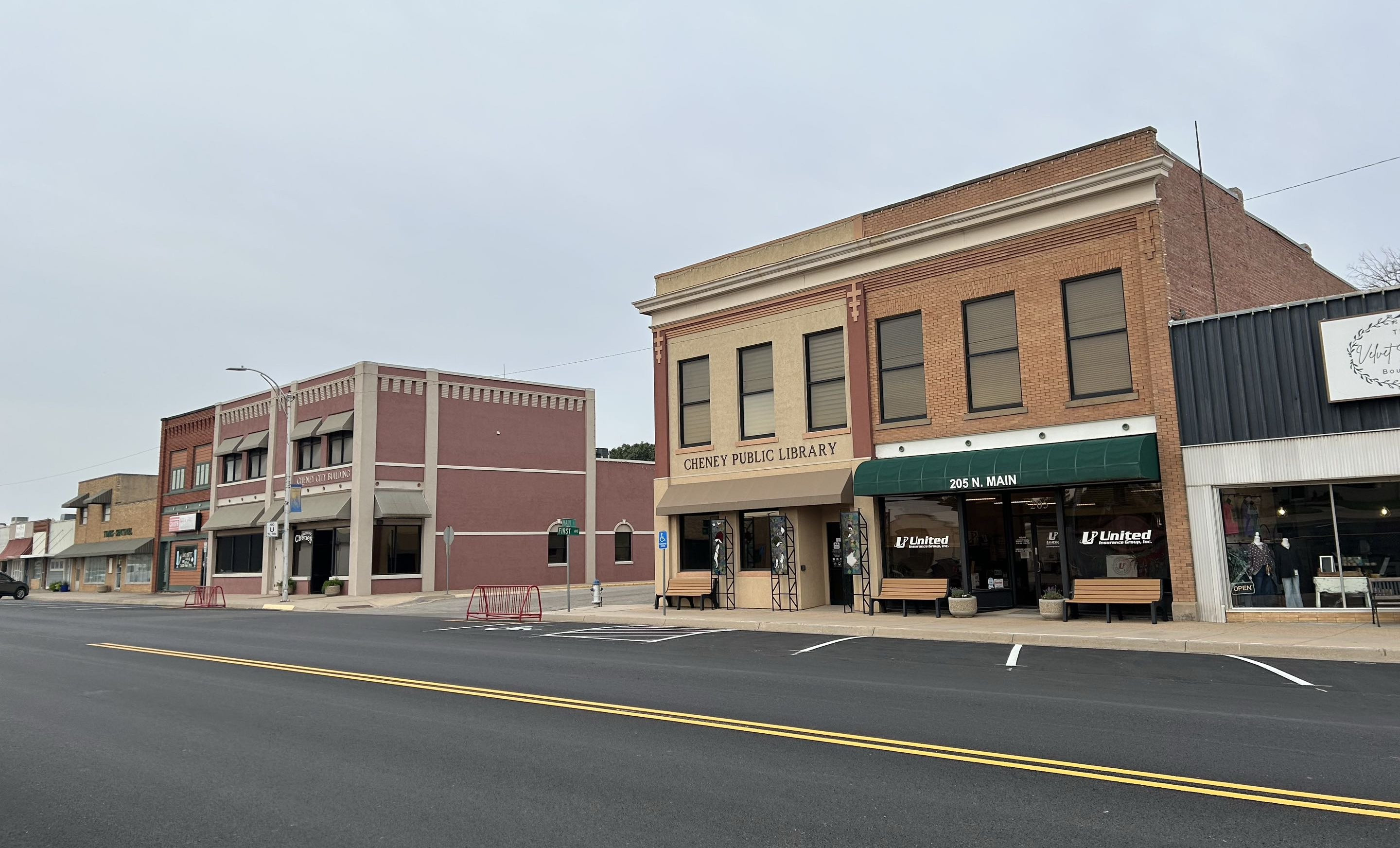
- Downtown Cheney in 2026

- Location within Sedgwick County and Kansas

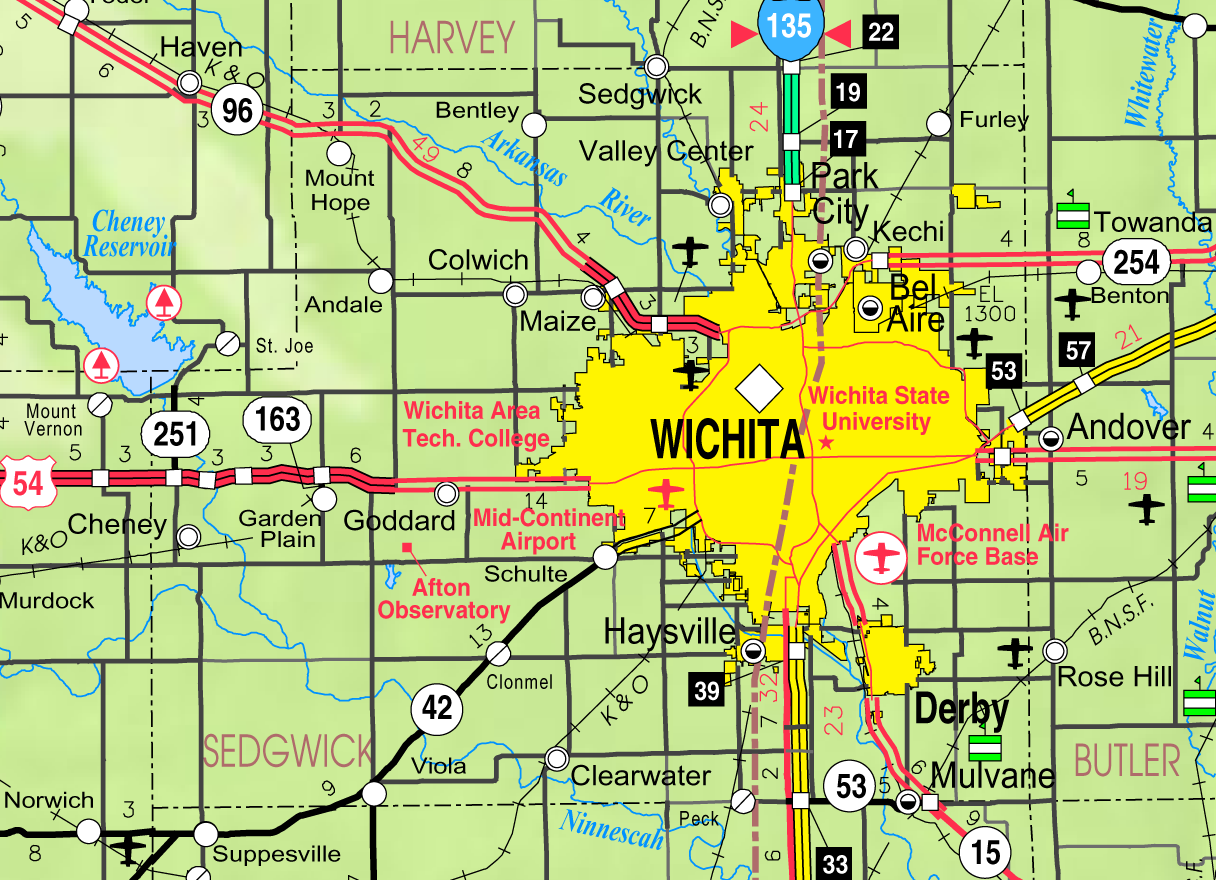
- KDOT map of Sedgwick County (legend)
- Coordinates: 37°37′49″N 97°46′56″W
- Country: United States
- State: Kansas
- County: Sedgwick
- Founded: 1883
- Incorporated: 1884
- Named for: Benjamin Cheney

Area
  - Total: 2.32 sq mi (6.00 km^{2})
  - Land: 2.32 sq mi (6.00 km^{2})
  - Water: 0 sq mi (0.00 km^{2})
- Elevation: 1,388 ft (423 m)

Population (2020)
  - Total: 2,181
  - Density: 941/sq mi (363/km^{2})
- Time zone: UTC-6 (CST)
  - Summer (DST): UTC-5 (CDT)
- ZIP Code: 67025
- Area code: 316
- FIPS code: 20-12775
- GNIS ID: 473976
- Website: www.cheneyks.org

Cheney /ˈtʃiːni/ is a city in Sedgwick County, Kansas, United States. As of the 2020 census, the population of the city was 2,181.

== History ==
Cheney was founded in August, 1883 and was named after Benjamin P. Cheney, a stockholder in the Atchison, Topeka and Santa Fe Railway.

Cheney served as a station and shipping point on the Wichita & Pratt division of the Atchison, Topeka and Santa Fe Railway.

The first post office in Cheney was established in September 1883.

== Geography ==
Cheney is located approximately 22 miles west of the outskirts of Wichita. According to the United States Census Bureau, the city has a total area of 1.99 square miles (5.15 km^{2}), all land.

=== Climate ===
The climate in this area is characterized by hot, humid summers and generally mild to cool winters. According to the Köppen Climate Classification system, Cheney has a humid subtropical climate, abbreviated "Cfa" on climate maps.

== Demographics ==
Historical population
| Census | Pop. | Note | %± |
|---|---|---|---|
| 1890 | 304 | | — |
| 1900 | 429 | | 41.1% |
| 1910 | 734 | | 71.1% |
| 1920 | 636 | | −13.4% |
| 1930 | 669 | | 5.2% |
| 1940 | 714 | | 6.7% |
| 1950 | 777 | | 8.8% |
| 1960 | 1,101 | | 41.7% |
| 1970 | 1,160 | | 5.4% |
| 1980 | 1,404 | | 21.0% |
| 1990 | 1,560 | | 11.1% |
| 2000 | 1,783 | | 14.3% |
| 2010 | 2,094 | | 17.4% |
| 2020 | 2,181 | | 4.2% |
U.S. Decennial Census

=== 2020 census ===
As of the 2020 census, Cheney had a population of 2,181 people, with 818 households and 584 families. The population density was 940.9 per square mile (363.3/km^{2}). There were 859 housing units at an average density of 370.6 per square mile (143.1/km^{2}). 0.0% of residents lived in urban areas, while 100.0% lived in rural areas.

The median age was 37.4 years. 28.7% of residents were under the age of 18 and 17.2% were 65 years of age or older. For every 100 females, there were 97.7 males, and for every 100 females age 18 and over, there were 93.5 males age 18 and over.

Of the 818 households, 39.1% had children under the age of 18 living in them. Of all households, 57.3% were married-couple households, 15.5% were households with a male householder and no spouse or partner present, and 22.2% were households with a female householder and no spouse or partner present. About 25.0% of all households were made up of individuals, and 12.1% had someone living alone who was 65 years of age or older.

There were 859 housing units, of which 4.8% were vacant. The homeowner vacancy rate was 1.4% and the rental vacancy rate was 3.7%.

Racial composition as of the 2020 census
| Race | Number | Percent |
|---|---|---|
| White | 2,044 | 93.7% |
| Black or African American | 1 | 0.0% |
| American Indian and Alaska Native | 14 | 0.6% |
| Asian | 7 | 0.3% |
| Native Hawaiian and Other Pacific Islander | 1 | 0.0% |
| Some other race | 15 | 0.7% |
| Two or more races | 99 | 4.5% |
| Hispanic or Latino (of any race) | 74 | 3.4% |

=== Demographic estimates ===
The 2016–2020 5-year American Community Survey estimates show that the average household size was 3.1 and the average family size was 3.5. The percent of those with a bachelor's degree or higher was estimated to be 16.7% of the population.

=== Income and poverty ===
The 2016–2020 5-year American Community Survey estimates show that the median household income was $64,818 (with a margin of error of +/- $11,045) and the median family income was $81,607 (+/- $13,407). Males had a median income of $44,213 (+/- $5,525) versus $19,221 (+/- $3,118) for females. The median income for those above 16 years old was $30,688 (+/- $9,721). Approximately, 6.9% of families and 8.6% of the population were below the poverty line, including 8.1% of those under the age of 18 and 5.7% of those ages 65 or over.

=== 2010 census ===
As of the census of 2010, there were 2,094 people, 773 households, and 563 families residing in the city. The population density was 1,052.3 inhabitants per square mile (406.3/km^{2}). There were 830 housing units at an average density of 417.1 per square mile (161.0/km^{2}). The racial makeup of the city was 97.3% White, 0.3% African American, 0.5% Native American, 0.5% from other races, and 1.3% from two or more races. Hispanic or Latino of any race were 2.5% of the population.

There were 773 households, of which 40.6% had children under the age of 18 living with them, 55.5% were married couples living together, 11.3% had a female householder with no husband present, 6.1% had a male householder with no wife present, and 27.2% were non-families. 24.3% of all households were made up of individuals, and 12% had someone living alone who was 65 years of age or older. The average household size was 2.64 and the average family size was 3.12.

The median age in the city was 35.6 years. 30.8% of residents were under the age of 18; 6.5% were between the ages of 18 and 24; 25.6% were from 25 to 44; 22.7% were from 45 to 64; and 14.3% were 65 years of age or older. The gender makeup of the city was 48.3% male and 51.7% female.

== Arts and culture ==
- Sedgwick County Fair
- Souders Historical Museum
- Cheney State Park and Cheney Reservoir

== Education ==
The community is served by Cheney USD 268 public school district, which operates three separate schools:

- Cheney High School
- Cheney Middle School
- Cheney Elementary School

Private schools

- St. Paul's Lutheran Church & School

== Transportation ==
The Atchison, Topeka and Santa Fe Railway formerly provided passenger rail service to Cheney on a line between Wichita and Pratt. Dedicated passenger service was provided until at least 1926, while mixed trains continued until at least 1961.
