= Castleton, Kansas =

Unincorporated community in Reno County, Kansas

- Unincorporated community
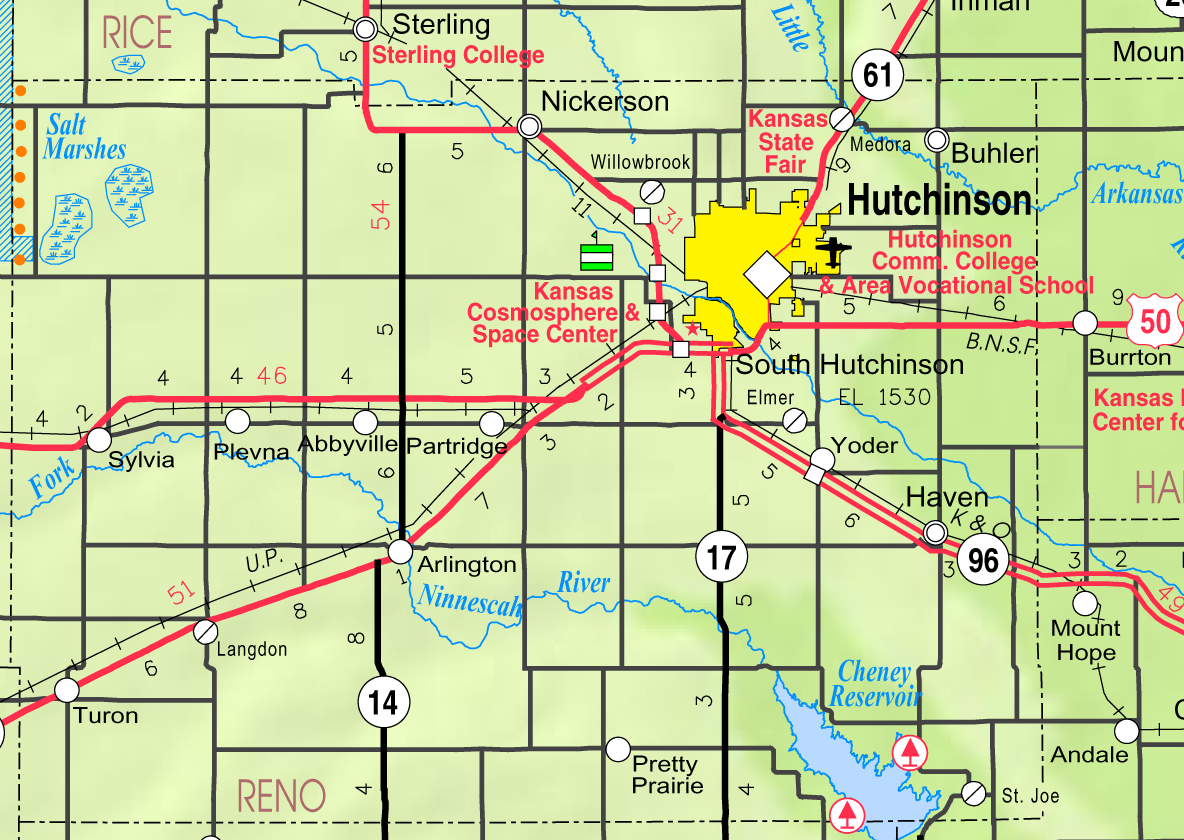
- KDOT map of Reno County (legend)

- Location within Kansas Location within the United States
- Coordinates: 37°52′4″N 97°58′9″W
- Country: United States
- State: Kansas
- County: Reno
- Elevation: 1,467 ft (447 m)
- Time zone: UTC-6 (CST)
  - Summer (DST): UTC-5 (CDT)
- FIPS code: 20-11000
- GNIS ID: 473798

Castleton is an unincorporated community in Reno County, Kansas, United States. It is located northeast of Pretty Prairie between Castleton Road and North Fork Ninnescah River.

== History ==
Castleton was a station and shipping point on the Hutchinson & Blackwell division of the Atchison, Topeka and Santa Fe Railway. It was originally platted by Clinton C. Hutchinson around 1871.

The post office was established December 6, 1872, remained in operation until it was discontinued on June 28, 1957. In 1971, the post office building was moved to the Barton County Historical Society Museum and Village in Great Bend, Kansas.

== Education ==
The community is served by Pretty Prairie USD 311 public school district.

Castleton High School closed in 1954, the mascot was the Pirates, colors red & blue. Castleton Grade School closed in 1970, most students transferred to Pretty Prairie school district.

== Transportation ==
The Atchison, Topeka and Santa Fe Railway formerly provided passenger rail service to Castleton on a line between Hutchinson and Ponca City. Dedicated passenger service was provided until at least 1954, while mixed trains continued until at least 1961. As of 2025, the nearest passenger rail station is located in Hutchinson, where Amtrak's Southwest Chief stops once daily on a route from Chicago to Los Angeles.

== In popular culture ==
Castleton was the setting for "Sevillinois, Illinois 1895" in the movie Wait Till the Sun Shines, Nellie filmed in 1952.

== Notable people ==
- Larry Foss, former MLB pitcher with the Pittsburgh Pirates and New York Mets.
