= Cheney USD 268 =

Public school district in Cheney, Kansas

Address
- 100 W. 6th Ave. Cheney, Kansas, 67025; United States
- Coordinates: 37°37′59″N 97°46′56″W

District information
- Type: Public
- Grades: K to 12
- Schools: 3

Other information
- Website: usd268.org

USD 268 is a public unified school district headquartered in Cheney, Kansas, United States. The district includes the communities of Cheney, Mount Vernon, and nearby rural areas.

== Schools ==
The school district operates the following schools:

- Cheney High School
- Cheney Middle School
- Cheney Elementary

There are approximately 240 students in grades 9-12. The Middle School houses grades six through eight with a population of just under 200 students.

== Sports ==
Fall sports include cross country, football, girls' golf, and volleyball, winter sports include bowling, basketball and wrestling. In the spring students play baseball, softball, track and field, the boys also golf.

The Cheney Cardinals have won the following Kansas State High School Championships:

- 1977 Boys Track and Field - Class 2A
- 1989 Girls Track and Field - Class 3A
- 1990 Girls Track and Field - Class 3A
- 1994 Boys Track and Field - Class 3A
- 2000 Boys Track and Field - Class 3A
- 2010 Girls Basketball - Class 4A
- 2013 Girl Golf - Class 3-2-1A
- 2014 Girls Track and Field - Class 3A
- 2020 Girls Basketball Forever four - Class 3A
- 2021 Girls Basketball - Class 3A
- 2021 Girls Softball - Class 3A
- 2023 Boys Football - Class 3A

== See also ==
- Kansas State Department of Education
- Kansas State High School Activities Association
- List of high schools in Kansas
- List of unified school districts in Kansas
