= Souders Historical Museum =

History museum in Cheney, Kansas

Coordinates: 37°36′55″N 97°47′59″W

The Souders Historical Museum is located 1/2 mile southwest of Cheney, Kansas, United States on MacArthur Road (39th St. S.) and depicts what life was like in Cheney and rural Kansas in the late 1880s and early 1900s.

There are a number of buildings at the museum, including a Main Street, several businesses, a school, a church, a homesteaders cabin, and train depots from both Cheney and neighboring Garden Plain. The buildings contain a variety of artifacts, historical photos and educational materials.

Built by Floyd and Norma Souders, the Museum was built up over several years. Some of the buildings are re-creations while others, such as the Dewey School, are historical structures that have been moved to the Museum. The Dewey School was a one-room school located in Kingman County just a few miles west of Cheney, and was in operation from 1880 until 1944.

The museum is open only by appointment.
