= Cheney Reservoir =

Reservoir in Kansas, United States

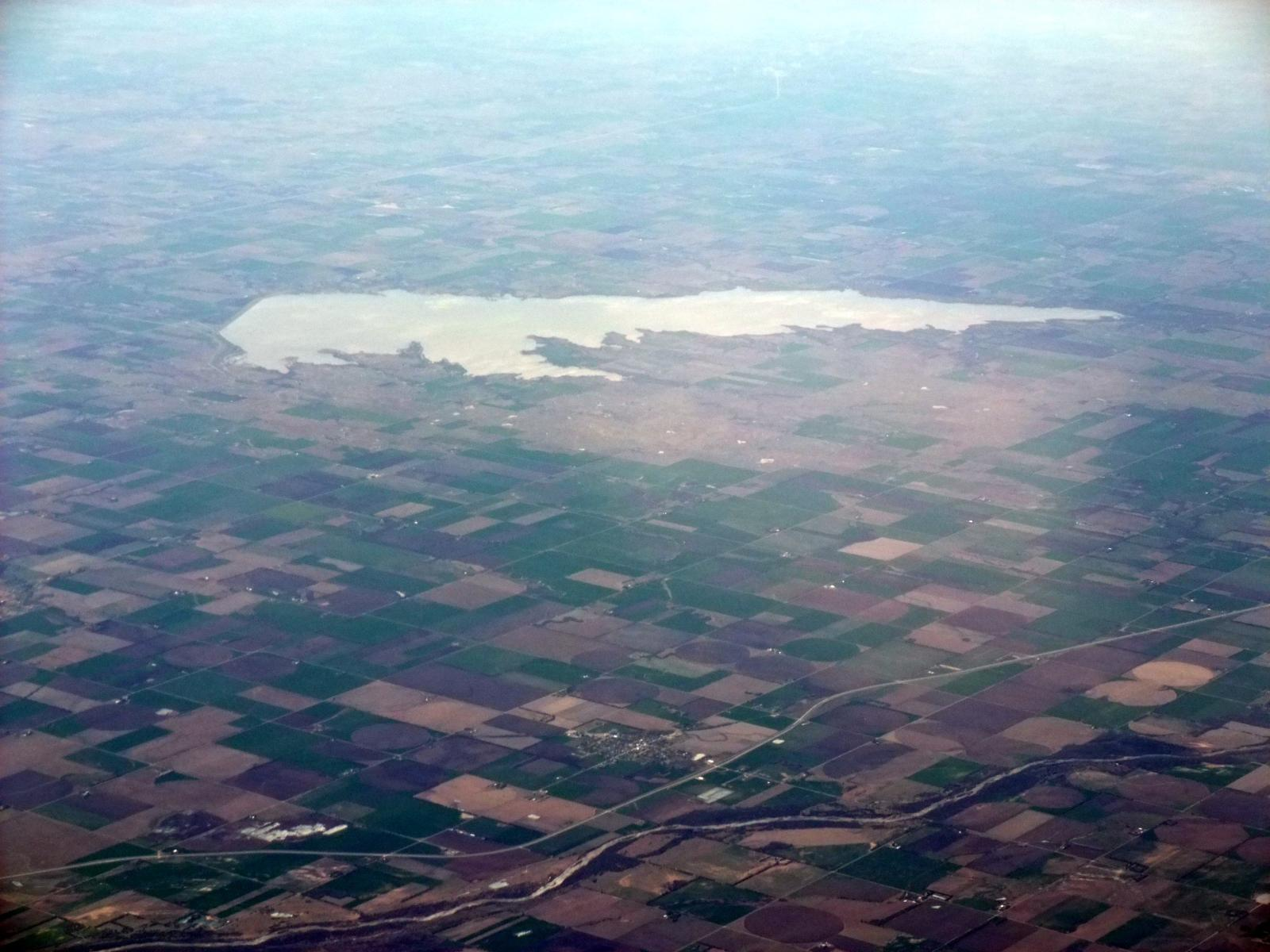
- Aerial view of Cheney Reservoir (looking southward) (2010)

- Location within Kansas
- Location: Sedgwick / Kingman / Reno counties in Kansas
- Coordinates: 37°45′35″N 97°50′06″W
- Type: Reservoir
- Primary inflows: North Fork Ninnescah River
- Primary outflows: North Fork Ninnescah River
- Catchment area: 1,036 sq mi (2,680 km^{2})
- Basin countries: United States
- Managing agency: U.S. Bureau of Reclamation
- Built: 1962
- First flooded: November 1964
- Surface area: 9,550 acres (38.6 km^{2})
- Max. depth: 42 feet (13 m)
- Water volume: Full: 167,074 acre⋅ft (206,083,000 m^{3}); Current (Nov. 2015): 156,432 acre⋅ft (192,956,000 m^{3})
- Shore length^{1}: 67 miles (108 km)
- Surface elevation: Full: 1,422 ft (433 m); Current (Nov. 2015): 1,421 ft (433 m)
- Settlements: Mount Vernon, St. Joe, Cheney, Pretty Prairie
- ^{1} Shore length is not a well-defined measure.

Cheney Reservoir is a reservoir on the North Fork Ninnescah River in Reno, Kingman, and Sedgwick counties of Kansas in the United States. Built and managed by the U.S. Bureau of Reclamation for local water supply, it is also used for flood control and recreation. Cheney State Park is located on its shore. Its dam is located approximately 4 miles (6.4 km) north of U.S. Route 54 (U.S. Route 400).

== History ==
The U.S. Bureau of Reclamation, and later the Arkansas-Red-White Basin Interagency Committee established in 1950, conducted studies on the Ninnescah River basin as part of an investigation of the broader Arkansas River basin. The investigation resulted in a water-use and control plan including the construction of reservoirs and the use of available water as a regulated supply for the city of Wichita, Kansas. Wichita needed an additional water supply to supplement its existing supply wells. The water of the Arkansas River was of poor quality and too polluted to use, leaving the Ninnescah as the next closest potential source. The Bureau of Reclamation issued a report in 1957, and the U.S. Congress authorized the construction of Cheney Dam and Reservoir in 1960.

Construction began in 1962 and finished in 1965. Storage of water in the reservoir began with the closure of the river outlet works in November 1964, and delivery of water to the city of Wichita began in the summer of 1965. Conservation storage of water increased until the reservoir was filled in October 1968.

In 2016, geolocation company MaxMind announced that its default locations for various countries would be manually changed to point to bodies of water instead of pointing to places on land; this included setting the middle of Cheney Reservoir as the default location for the United States. MaxMind's default locations are placed near the geographic centers of their respective countries, and are the coordinates that MaxMind's online geolocation service provides whenever it's queried for an IP address where it can only determine the country of origin. Before the 2016 change, MaxMind's default location for the United States was a farmhouse in nearby Potwin, Kansas, but this caused significant legal trouble for its residents due to various people and organizations assuming that the farmhouse was the actual source of certain malicious IP addresses.

== Geography ==
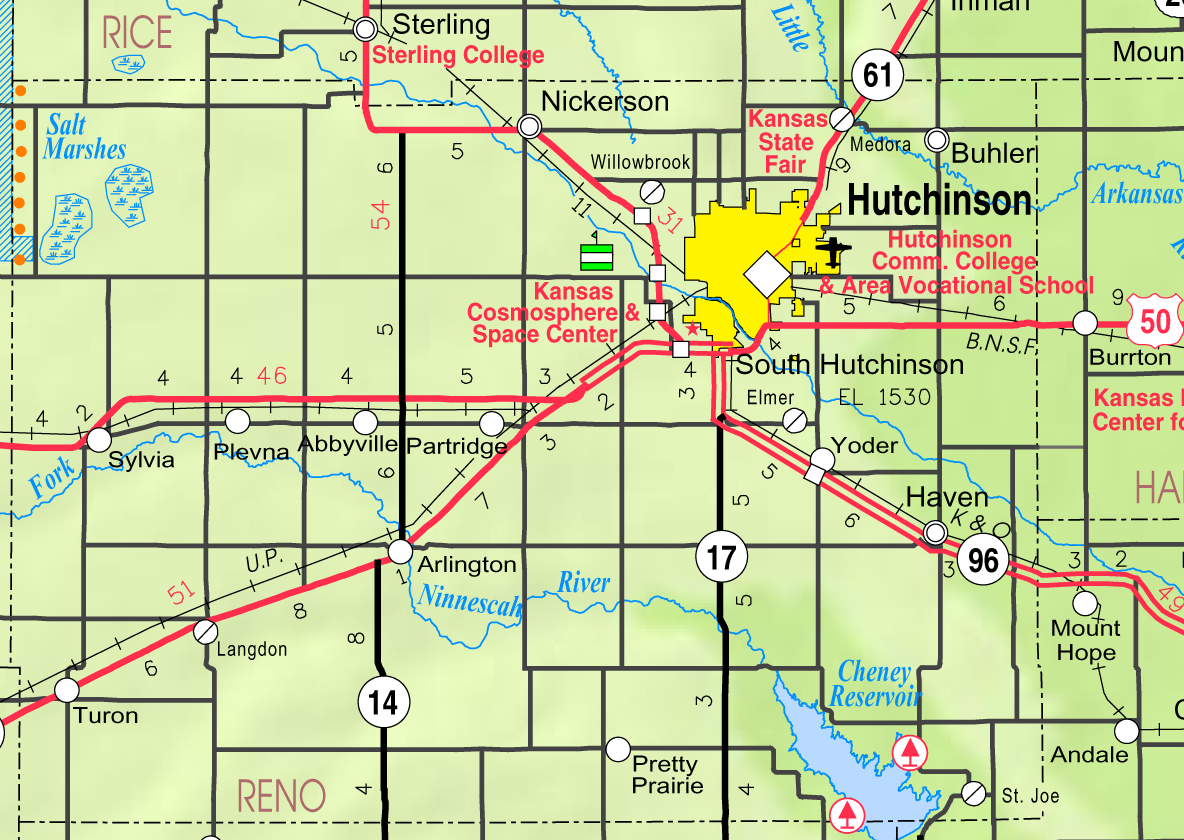
KDOT map of Reno County, and Cheney Reservoir relative to city of Hutchinson

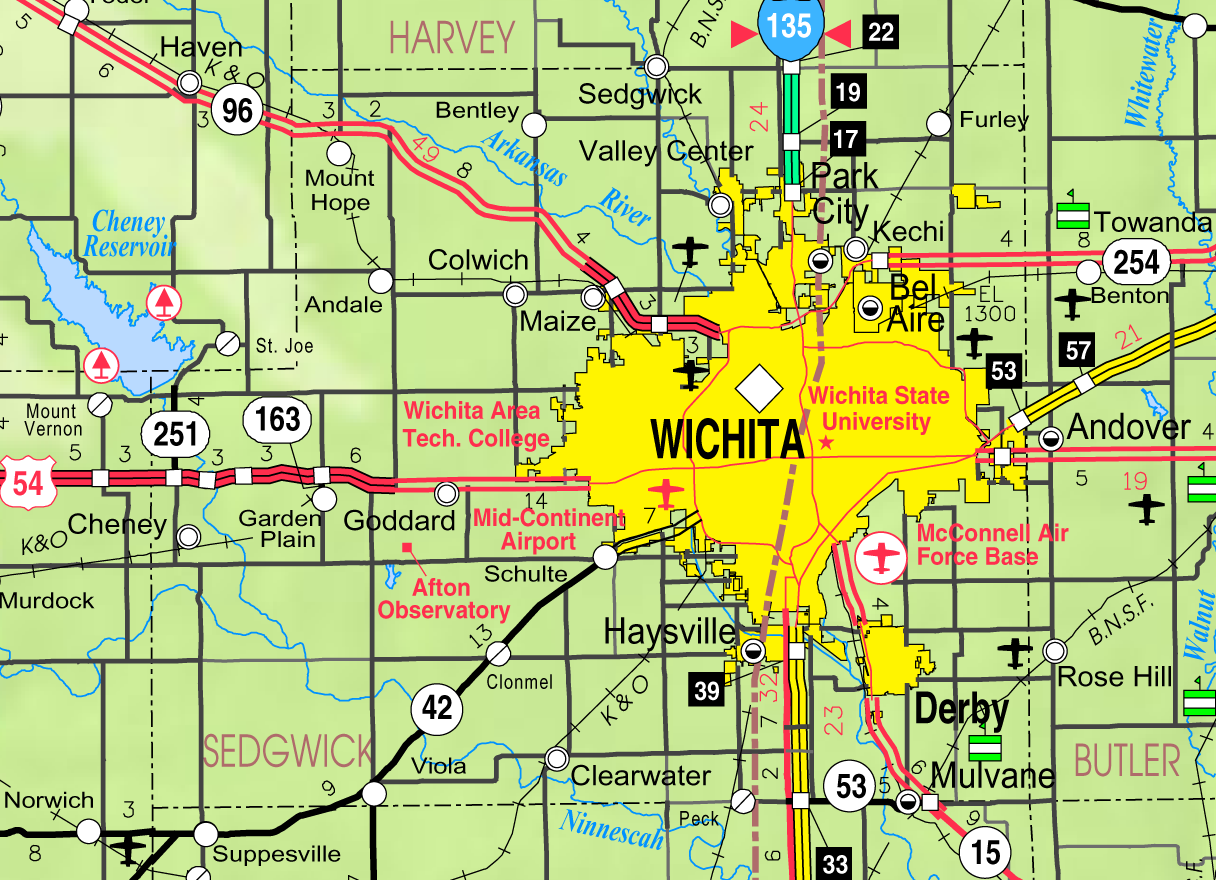
KDOT map of Sedgwick County, and Cheney Reservoir relative to city of Wichita

Cheney Reservoir is located at 37°45′35″N 97°50′06″W (37.7597113, -97.8350121) at an elevation of 1,421 feet (433 m). It lies in south-central Kansas in the Wellington Lowlands region of the Great Plains. Most of the reservoir lies in Reno County though its southwestern portion extends into Kingman County, and a small portion along the dam lies within Sedgwick County. The junction of the three counties' borders lies in the reservoir.

The reservoir is impounded at its southeastern end by Cheney Dam (National ID # KS00017). The dam is located at 37°43′31″N 97°47′51″W (37.7252898, -97.7975511) at an elevation of 1,417 feet (432 m). The middle portion of Cheney Dam lies in the northwest corner of Sedgwick County, its southwestern end lies in Kingman County, and its northeastern end lies in Reno County. The North Fork Ninnescah River is both the reservoir's primary inflow from the northwest and its outflow to the southeast.

Kansas Highway 251, which runs north-south, connects the reservoir to U.S. Route 54 4 miles (6.4 km) to the south and the community of Cheney 5.5 miles (8.9 km) to the south. Below the dam, the highway becomes a paved county road and turns northeast, running parallel to the dam then finally turning east. 21st Street North, another paved county road, runs east-west immediately south of the dam.

There are two settlements at Cheney Reservoir, both unincorporated: Mount Vernon, located 1 mile (1.6 km) west of the dam, and St. Joe, located 2 miles (3.2 km) east of the reservoir's southeastern end.

== Hydrography ==
The surface area, surface elevation, and water volume of the reservoir fluctuate based on inflow and local climatic conditions. In terms of capacity, the Bureau of Reclamation vertically divides the reservoir into a set of pools based on volume and water level, and it considers the reservoir full when filled to the capacity of its active conservation pool. When full, Cheney Reservoir has a surface area of 9,550 acres (38.6 km^{2}), a surface elevation of 1,422 feet (433 m), and a volume of 167,074 acre-feet (206,083,000 m^{3}). When filled to maximum capacity, it has an approximate surface area of 26,000 acres (110 km^{2}), a surface elevation of 1,453 feet (443 m), and a volume of 699,278 acre-feet (862,547,000 m^{3}).

The streambed underlying the reservoir has an elevation of 1,368 feet (417 m).

== Infrastructure ==
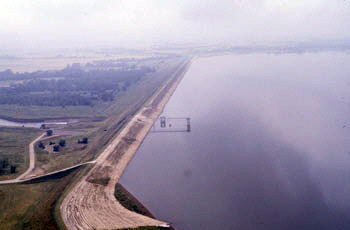
Cheney Dam

Cheney Dam has a structural height of 126 feet (38 m) and a length of 24,458 feet (7,455 m). At its crest, it has an elevation of 1,454 feet (443 m). Its upstream face is covered with soil cement while its downstream face consists of a 12-foot (3.7 m) layer of topsoil and grass. It has an uncontrolled spillway that leads to a conduit and stilling basin as well as two sets of outlet works: one for the river and one for Wichita's municipal water supply.

== Management ==
The U.S. Bureau of Reclamation owns and operates the dam and reservoir for flood control and municipal water supply purposes as part of its Wichita Project. The City of Wichita operates a pumping facility below the dam which pipes water to a treatment plant in the city. The Kansas Department of Wildlife, Parks and Tourism (KDWP) manages 5,439 acres (22.01 km^{2}) of land around the reservoir as the Cheney Wildlife Area.

== Parks and recreation ==
The KDWP operates Cheney State Park located on both shores of the reservoir's southern end. The 1,913-acre (7.74 km^{2}) park is divided into two areas: the East Shore Area and the West Shore Area. Both areas include boat ramps, campgrounds, and swimming beaches. The East Shore Area also hosts a full-service marina, and the West Shore Area includes hiking trails as well as the Ninnescah Sailing Center.

Cheney Reservoir is open for sport fishing year-round. Hunting is permitted on the public land around the reservoir although it is restricted in certain areas. In addition, certified range officers operate the Cheney Shooting Range on weekends at the north end of the Cheney Wildlife Area.

== Wildlife ==
Fish species resident in the reservoir include channel catfish, crappie, striped bass, walleye, white bass, and wiper. Two invasive species, the white perch and the zebra mussel, live in the lake as well. Game animals living around the reservoir include doves, pheasants, quail, rabbits, and wild turkeys. Other land animals in the area include beavers, bobcats, muskrats, opossums, raccoons, red foxes, and skunks.

== See also ==
- Lake Afton, southeast of Cheney Reservoir
- List of Kansas state parks
- List of lakes, reservoirs, and dams in Kansas
- List of rivers of Kansas
