= Tornadoes of 1990 =

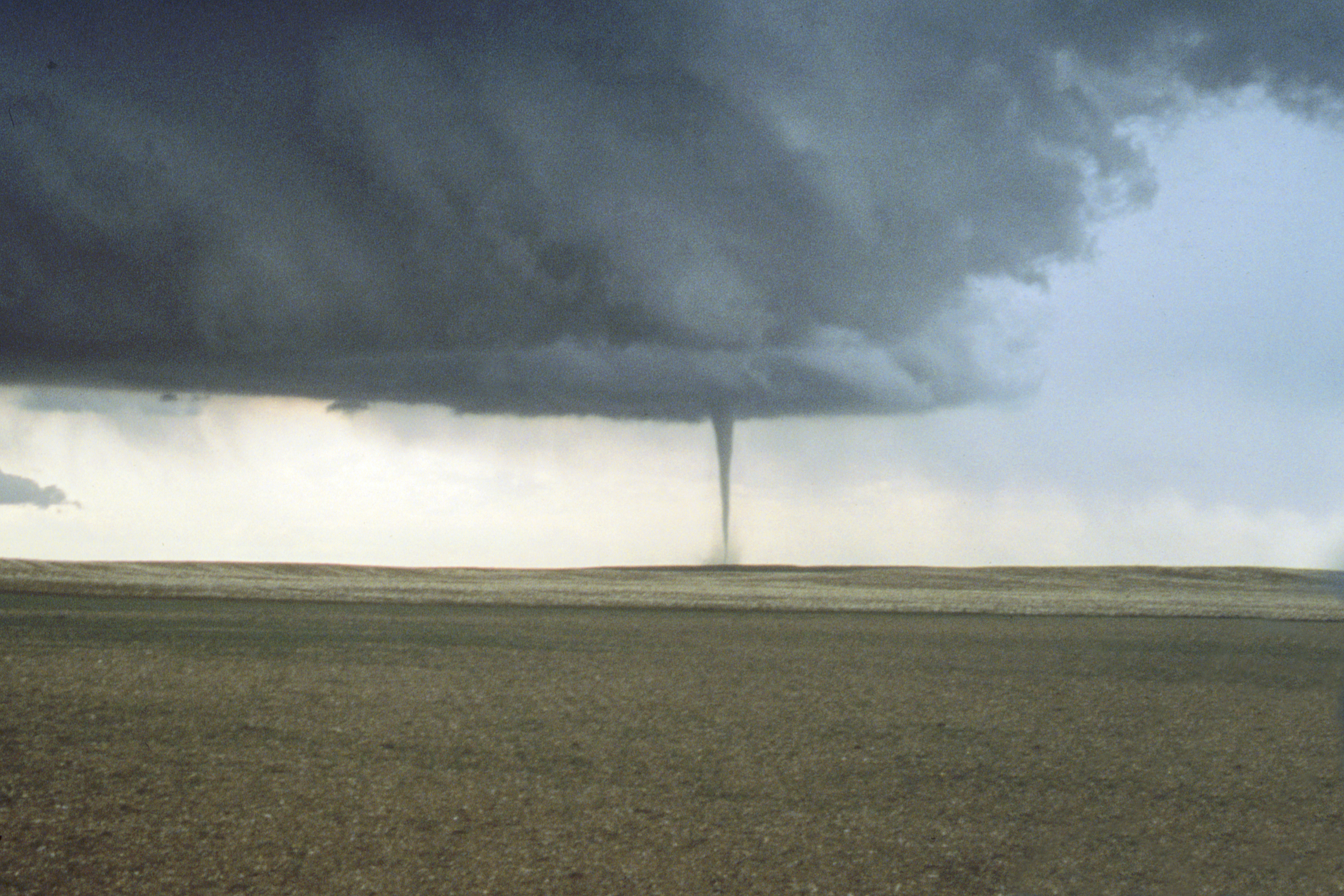
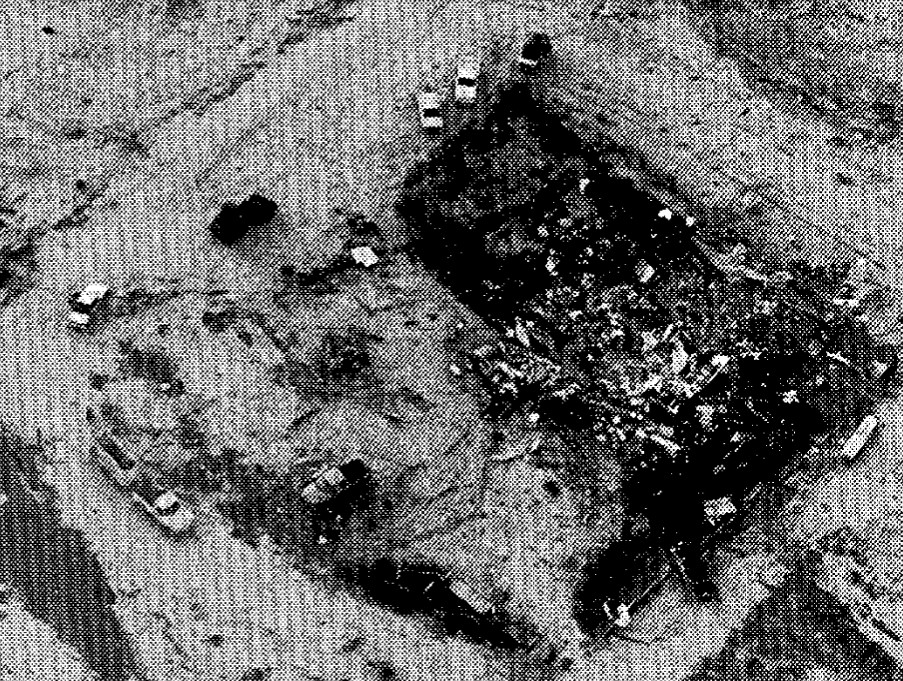
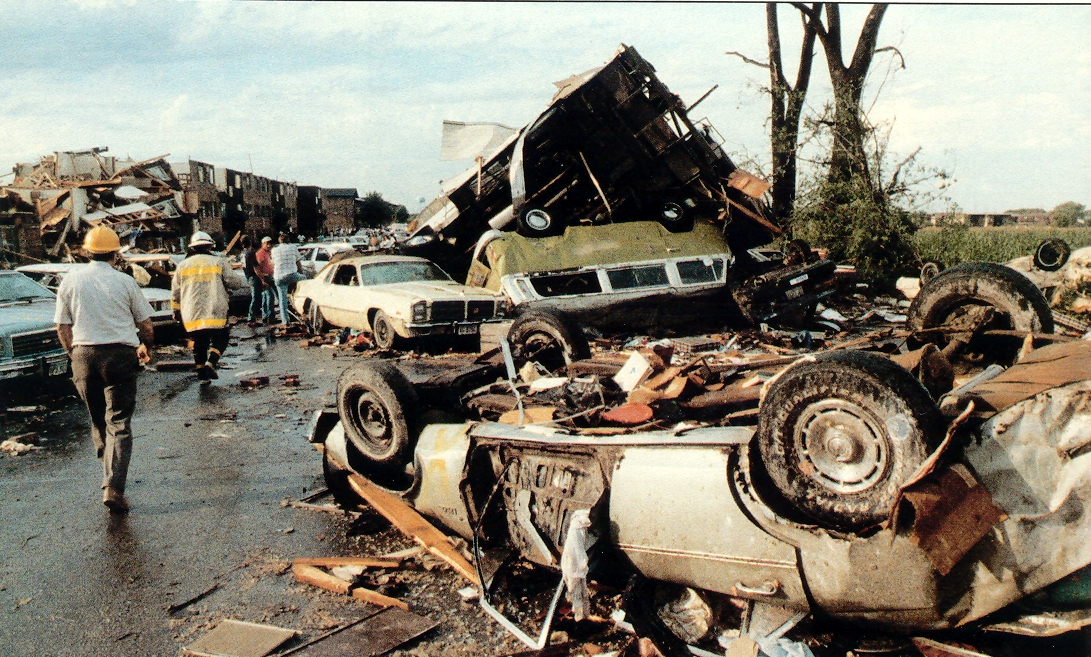
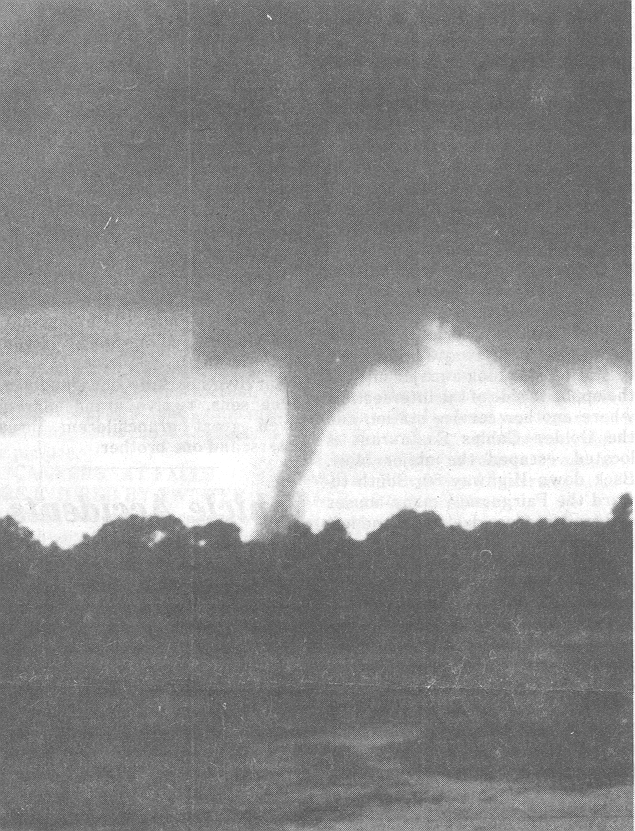
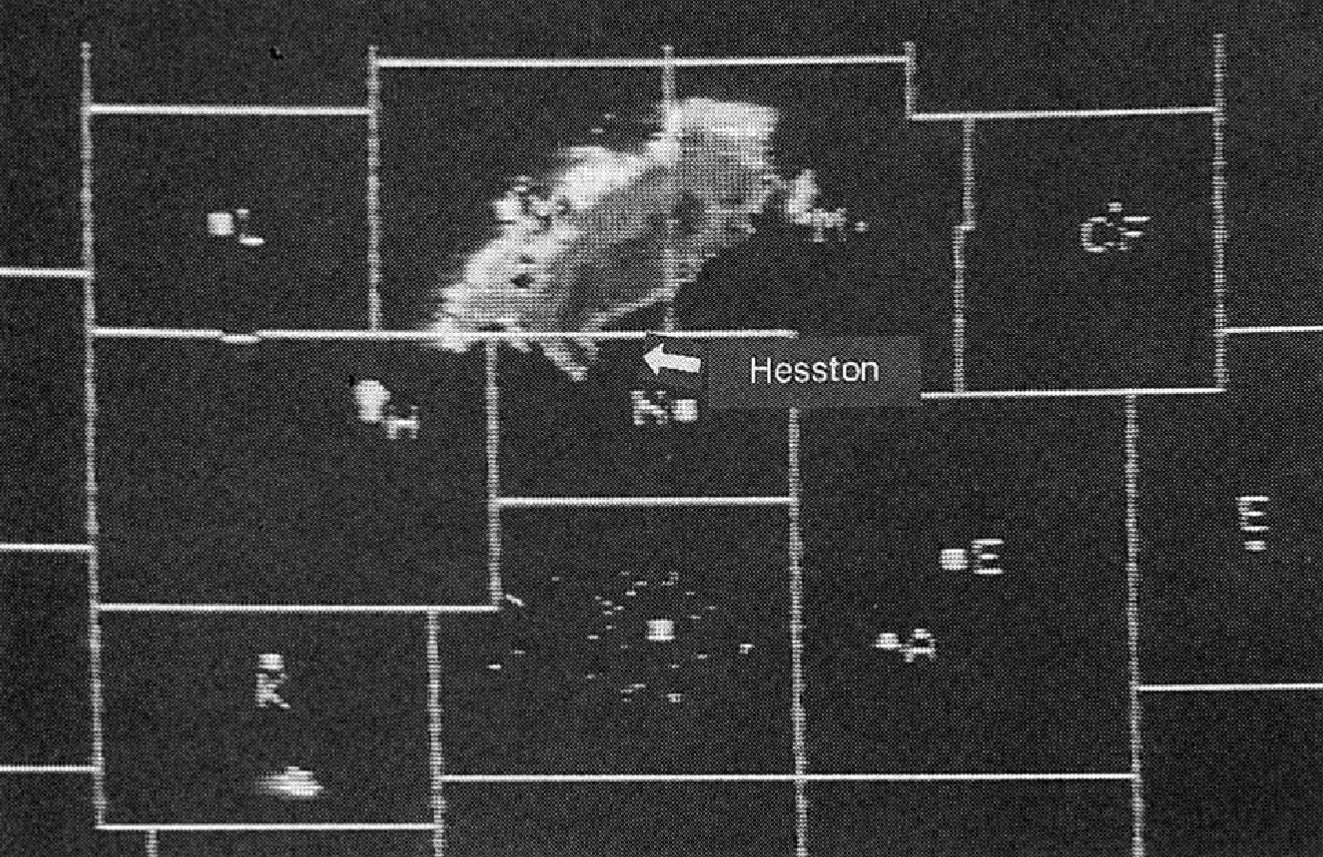
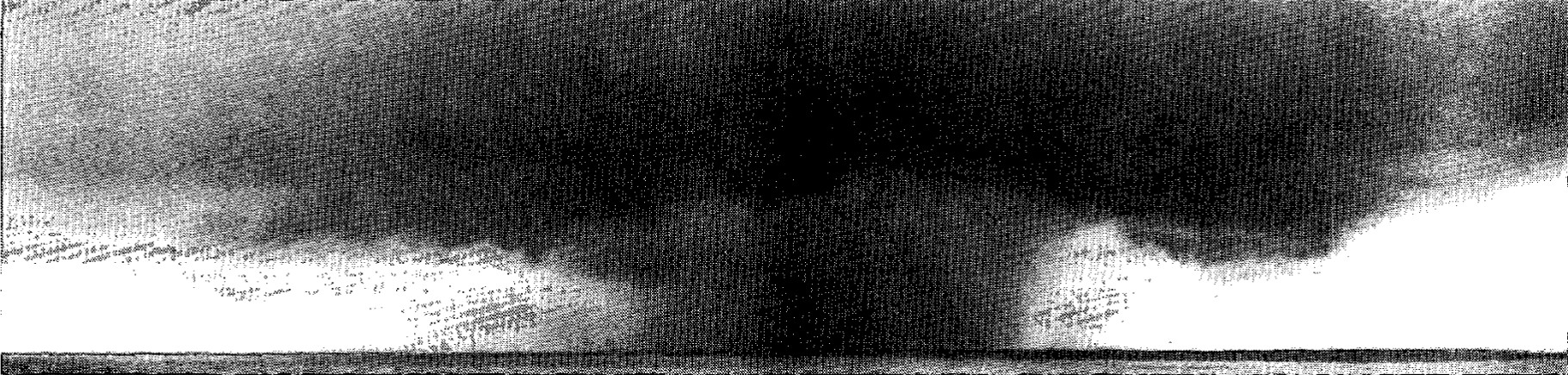
- Clockwise from top: A rope tornado in Bowles Flats, Montana in June; Violent damage in Plainfield, Illinois after an F5 tornado on August 28; A radar scan of a tornado producing supercell approaching Hesston, Kansas on March 13; A large F3 tornado approaching Limon, Colorado on June 6; A thin F3 tornado approaching Loogootee, Indiana on June 2; F4 damage to a home in Bakersfield Valley, Texas after a tornado on June 1.
- Timespan: January–December 1990
- Maximum rated tornado: F5 tornado: Hesston, Kansas on March 13; Goessel, Kansas on March 13; Plainfield, Illinois on August 28
- Tornadoes in U.S.: 1,131
- Damage (U.S.): ≥$165 million
- Fatalities (U.S.): 53
- Fatalities (worldwide): >148

This page documents the tornadoes and tornado outbreaks of 1990, primarily in the United States. Most tornadoes form in the U.S., although some events may take place internationally. Tornado statistics for older years like this often appear significantly lower than modern years due to fewer reports or confirmed tornadoes, however by the 1990s tornado statistics were coming closer to the numbers we see today.

== Synopsis ==
Fatal United States tornadoes in 1990
- Approximate touchdown location of killer tornadoes in 1990 Summary of tornadoes: February 9 – Mississippi (1 death); March 13 – Kansas (1 death); March 13 – Kansas (1 death); March 14 – Arkansas (1 death); May 4 – Virginia (2 deaths); May 4 – Ohio (1 death); May 15 – Oklahoma (1 death); May 16 – Arkansas (1 death); June 1 – Texas (2 deaths); June 2 – Illinois, Indiana (1 death); June 2 – Indiana (1 death); June 2 – Indiana (6 deaths); June 2 – Indiana (1 death); August 28 – Illinois (29 deaths); October 18 – Virginia (1 death); October 22 – South Carolina (1 death); December 21 – Mississippi (1 death); December 21 – Mississippi (1 death); Total fatalities: 53

1990 saw some unusual and powerful tornadoes and tornado outbreaks.

On March 13, as part of a larger tornado outbreak across The Great Plains and midwestern U.S, two F5 tornadoes struck Hesston and Goessel, in the state of Kansas, both coming from the same supercell. This was the only day since the 1974 Super Outbreak to have more than one F5 on the same day until the 2011 Super Outbreak, when four EF5 tornadoes touched down on April 27.

In June, a strong outbreak struck the upper Midwest United States. By late August, a powerful F5 tornado struck the city of Plainfield, Illinois, resulting in significant loss of life and damage.

== Events ==
Confirmed tornado total for the entire year 1990 in the United States.

Confirmed tornadoes by Fujita rating
FU	F0	F1	F2	F3	F4	F5	Total
0	537	385	155	41	10	3	1,131

== January ==
There were 11 tornadoes confirmed in the US in January.

== February ==
There were 57 tornadoes confirmed in the US in February.

=== February 19 (Japan) ===
A landfalling waterspout struck Makurazaki, Kagoshima, killing 1 person and injuring 18 others. The tornado damaged 383 homes and completely destroyed 29. 88 houses were half destroyed, and 266 others were partially destroyed. 25 cars were rolled over as well.

== March ==
There were 86 tornadoes confirmed in the US in March.

=== March 11–13 ===
FU	F0	F1	F2	F3	F4	F5
0	12	25	13	10	2	2

This destructive tornado outbreak produced at least 64 tornadoes across the region including four violent tornadoes. Two F5 tornadoes touched down north and east of Wichita, Kansas, including the most publicized tornado, which struck Hesston. In Nebraska, several strong tornadoes touched down across the southern and central portion of the state including an F4 that traveled for over 125 miles. Two people were killed in the outbreak in Kansas, both from the F5 tornadoes.

== April ==
There were 108 tornadoes confirmed in the US in April.

== May ==
There were 243 tornadoes confirmed in the US in May.

=== May 15 ===
FU	F0	F1	F2	F3	F4	F5
0	7	6	3	1	0	0

An outbreak of 17 tornadoes injured nine people in Texas and Kansas, with the strongest being an F3 tornado in Anson, Texas.

== June ==
There were 329 tornadoes confirmed in the US in June.

=== June 1 ===
FU	F0	F1	F2	F3	F4	F5
0	1	1	0	0	1	0

On June 1, 1990, a large, extremely violent, multi-vortex tornado passed over rural areas of Pecos County, Texas. This tornado, which was preceded and succeeded by two smaller tornadoes, was rated as an F4. The tornado touched down near the unincorporated town of Girvin at 4:20 pm. During the first few miles of its path, it produced mainly F0 damage. As it approached FM 1901, it rapidly grew and intensified. F3 damage was done to a Co-Op building. As the tornado grew to its maximum width of 1.3 miles, it destroyed an adobe brick house at F4 intensity. As it continued, a half-mile wide swath of ground scouring and a 300 foot wide strip of asphalt scouring were noted. The tornado weakened to F2 intensity, but became a killer as it tossed a dump truck and a car containing a family of four. The driver of the dump truck and the father of the family were the only fatalities recorded. The tornado then reintensified as it entered a tank battery, where it picked up two 500-barrel [oil tanks] and tossed and rolled them for three miles before rolling them 600 feet up the side of a steep hill, earning an F4 rating. The tornado damaged and destroyed 57 pump jacks before lifting five miles southwest of the town of Iraan. Throughout many places along its path, Mesquite trees were uprooted and ground to a pulp, consistent with extreme intensity.

=== June 2–3 ===
FU	F0	F1	F2	F3	F4	F5
0	16	21	17	5	7	0

This outbreak occurred in southern Illinois, central and southern Indiana, southwestern Ohio, and northern Kentucky on June 2 and June 3. 66 tornadoes struck the Ohio River Valley, including seven F4 tornadoes, resulting in nine deaths. One F4 tornado trekked 106 miles (171 km) from southeastern Illinois into southern Indiana, killing one person. 37 tornadoes occurred in Indiana, eclipsing the previous record of 21 set during the 1974 Super Outbreak. In addition, 12 tornadoes struck Illinois.

=== June 6 ===
FU	F0	F1	F2	F3	F4	F5
1	5	0	1	2	0	0

On the evening of June 6, 1990, a large system of severe supercell thunderstorms swept across the sparsely populated region of eastern Colorado from the Wyoming border to southeast of Colorado Springs. It spawned baseball-sized hail, funnel clouds, and at least nine tornadoes, including an F2 east of Colorado Springs; a large tornado southwest of Limon, Colorado, of F3 intensity that lasted for 7 minutes; and the largest, a .25 mile- (.4 km) wide, rain-wrapped F3 that devastated the town of Limon along a 10-mile (16 km) path with near-F4 intensity. The latter tornado swung four Union Pacific Railroad freight cars off their tracks, knocked out all telephone service, wiped out 80% of the town's business district, and destroyed 228 of the town's 750 homes. In all, it caused $12.8 million in damage and ranked as one of the strongest tornadoes to occur in the state. Furthermore, it injured 14 people, five of whom were hospitalized. In response, then-governor Roy Romer declared Limon a disaster area. The event made national headlines and, as tornadoes of that size are rare in eastern Colorado, resulted in the publication of multiple academic articles, including one in the National Weather Digest by meteorologist Todd A. Heitkamp; one in Weather and Forecasting by James F. W. Purdom, Edward J. Szoke, and John Weaver; and another by James F. W. Purdom and John Weaver for the Sixth Conference on Satellite Meteorology and Oceanography. The storm was also documented on video by unknown observers and in a collection of 25 photographs by meteorologist Eugene W. McCaul, Jr.

=== June 12 (Philippines) ===
An EF2 struck the coastal municipality of Manukan in Zamboanga del Norte at around 19:00 PhST. It leveled a total of 154 houses, mostly made of coconut leaves, carried people, plants and animals into the sea. And hundreds of People were left homeless, More than 100 were Injured, and 51 People were Killed. A State of Calamity was declared in the province due to the heavy destruction on Agricultural Crops, Infrastructures, and Properties that amounted up to ₱40 Million.

=== June 15 ===
An extremely violent F4 tornado touched down on the northwestern edge of Stratton, Nebraska, initially as a multiple-vortex tornado. It would then move east-northeast and fully condense over Swanson Lake, before lifting 5 miles northeast of McCook. 35 rural houses in Hitchcock County, as well as 4 in Red Willow County were damaged or destroyed, including some that were leveled or swept from their foundations. Extreme vehicle damage occurred, with cars being tossed over 0.5 mi (800 m) and torn apart, with firewall being reportedly found 7 mi (11 km) away. Telephone communications were severed for several hours across Hitchcock County, and all highways going into the county were blocked off. Mud from Swanson Lake caked buildings with dried mud up to 2 inches thick on houses, trees and light poles. Damage estimates came to over $632,000, with crop damage costing up to $1,240,000. Miraculously, only one injury occurred.

== July ==
There were 106 tornadoes confirmed in the US in July.

== August ==
There were 60 tornadoes confirmed in the U.S. in August.

=== August 28 ===
FU	F0	F1	F2	F3	F4	F5
0	4	4	2	1	0	1

A storm system spawned numerous tornadoes on August 28, including the devastating F5 Plainfield, Illinois tornado. The violent, rain wrapped tornado killed 29 people and injured 350. It is the only F5 tornado ever officially recorded in August (the 1883 Rochester tornado has an unofficial F5 rating) and is the only F5 tornado on record to ever strike the Chicago area. Other tornadoes were reported in parts of Michigan, New York, and Canada, including an F3 tornado in Elgin County, Ontario.

=== August 31 ===
A tornado occurred in a suburb of Shanghai in association with Typhoon Abe.

== September ==
There were 45 tornadoes confirmed in the US in September.

== October ==
There were 35 tornadoes confirmed in the US in October.

=== October 18 ===
FU	F0	F1	F2	F3	F4	F5
0	4	6	2	4	0	0

A large tornado outbreak in the Eastern United States produced 16 tornadoes, including four F3 tornadoes in Union County, North Carolina, King William County, Virginia, Orange County, Virginia and Somerset County, New Jersey. There was one fatality and 76 injuries from the outbreak.

=== October 22 ===
A funnel cloud was sighted in Cordova, and 2 miles north of Orangeburg. It moved southwest to northeast from north of Orangeburg, duplicate to Highway 601, and then it moved into Calhoun County, where an F2 tornado touched down shortly. It injured 4 people and killed a 11-year-old girl. The tornado destroyed three mobile homes, two sheds, a room of a brick house, and a small concrete building. A house was moved off of its foundation by the tornado.

== November ==
There were 18 tornadoes confirmed in the US in November.

== December ==
There were 35 tornadoes confirmed in the US in December.

=== December 11–12 (Japan) ===
A powerful F3 (F4 according to Ted Fujita) stovepipe tornado struck Mobara City while damaging 1,747 homes and completely destroying 82 homes. 162 homes were half destroyed, and 1,504 others were partially damaged. Steel-framed and reinforced concrete buildings were damaged, including a well-built hospital, and several vehicles were either thrown or overturned. The tornado caused power outages while killing 1 person and injuring 73 others. This tornado was part of a small outbreak that spawned at least four, and possibly as many as seven tornadoes in Japan, including the Mobara tornado.

=== December 20–23 ===
FU	F0	F1	F2	F3	F4	F5
0	1	22	4	4	0	0

A large, late-season outbreak of tornadoes affected Mississippi and Louisiana on December 20–22. Two tornadoes killed one person each in Mississippi on December 21. One of these deaths was caused by a significant F3 tornado that touched down a half mile north of Bowling Green, Mississippi, and lifted 5 miles northeast of Vaiden, Mississippi, moving northeast at 40–45 miles per hour. An F1 tornado touched down in Ohio on December 23 before the outbreak ended. In all, the outbreak killed two and injured 23.

== See also ==
- Tornado
  - Tornadoes by year
  - Tornado records
  - Tornado climatology
  - Tornado myths
- List of tornado outbreaks
  - List of F5 and EF5 tornadoes
  - List of North American tornadoes and tornado outbreaks
  - List of 21st-century Canadian tornadoes and tornado outbreaks
  - List of European tornadoes and tornado outbreaks
  - List of tornadoes and tornado outbreaks in Asia
  - List of Southern Hemisphere tornadoes and tornado outbreaks
  - List of tornadoes striking downtown areas
- Tornado intensity
  - Fujita scale
  - Enhanced Fujita scale
