= Cheney High School (Kansas) =

Public high school in Cheney, Kansas, US

Location
- 100 W. 6th Avenue; Cheney, Kansas 67025; United States
- Coordinates: 37.6340°N 97.7823°W

Information
- School type: Public, High School
- Established: 1907
- School district: Cheney USD 268
- CEEB code: 170530
- Principal: Greg Rosenhagen
- Grades: 9 to 12
- Gender: coed
- Enrollment: 246 (2024–25)
- Campus: Urban
- Colors: Scarlet Red; Royal Blue
- Mascot: Cardinals
- Website: School Webpage

Cheney High School is a public high school in Cheney, Kansas, United States. It is operated by Cheney USD 268 school district. The school is located at 800 North Marshall Street. The school mascot is the cardinal and the school colors are red and blue.

== History ==
Plans for building a high school in Cheney were announced in 1907.

== State Championships ==
State Championships
Season	Sport	Number of Championships	Year
Fall	Football	1	2023
Total		1	

== See also ==
- List of high schools in Kansas
- List of unified school districts in Kansas
