= Pretty Prairie, Kansas =

City in Reno County, Kansas, United States

- City
- Location within Reno County and Kansas

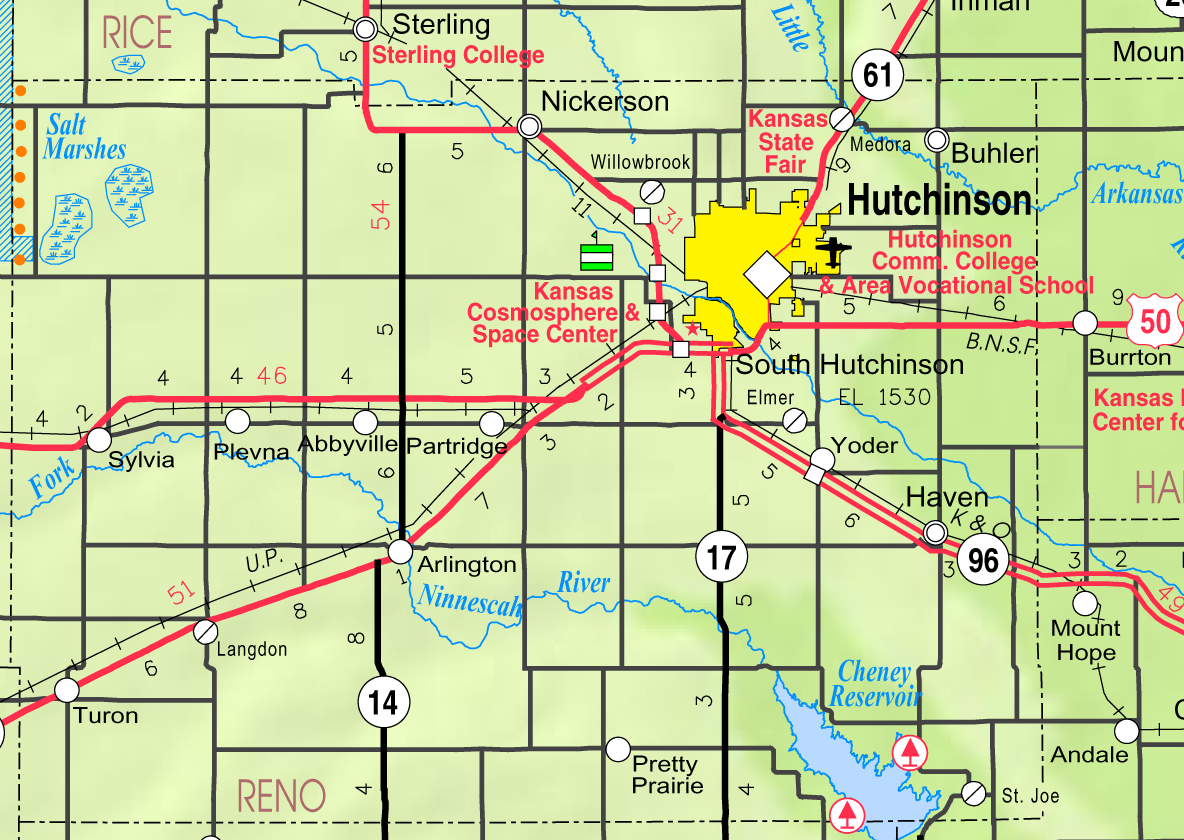
- KDOT map of Reno County (legend)
- Coordinates: 37°46′48″N 98°01′21″W
- Country: United States
- State: Kansas
- County: Reno
- Founded: 1870s
- Platted: 1889
- Incorporated: 1906
- Named for: Prairie

Area
  - Total: 0.58 sq mi (1.49 km^{2})
  - Land: 0.58 sq mi (1.49 km^{2})
  - Water: 0 sq mi (0.00 km^{2})
- Elevation: 1,568 ft (478 m)

Population (2020)
  - Total: 660
  - Density: 1,100/sq mi (440/km^{2})
- Time zone: UTC-6 (CST)
  - Summer (DST): UTC-5 (CDT)
- ZIP Code: 67570
- Area code: 620 Exchange 459
- FIPS code: 20-57700
- GNIS ID: 2396275
- Website: cityofprettyprairie.org

Pretty Prairie is a city in Reno County, Kansas, United States. As of the 2020 census, the population of the city was 660.

== History ==
The first post office at Pretty Prairie was established in 1874.

Pretty Prairie was laid out in 1889. It was named from its scenic setting upon the prairie. It was incorporated as a city in 1907.

The city's sole source of water is a single well, a 100-foot-deep borehole. Due to agricultural pollution from the region's groundwater, the well water has had nitrate levels in excess of the federal nitrate standard since the mid-1990s. For years, Pretty Prairie distributed bottled water to at-risk families. On January 3, 2017, the town council approved a settlement with the Kansas Department of Health and Environment and the EPA. The town planned to invest in a water tower, an underground storage tank, and a reverse osmosis water treatment system.

== Geography ==
According to the United States Census Bureau, the city has a total area of 0.61 square miles (1.58 km^{2}), of which, 0.56 square miles (1.45 km^{2}) is land and 0.05 square miles (0.13 km^{2}) is water.

=== Climate ===
The climate in this area is characterized by hot, humid summers and generally mild to cool winters. According to the Köppen Climate Classification system, Pretty Prairie has a humid subtropical climate, abbreviated "Cfa" on climate maps.

== Demographics ==
Historical population
Census	Pop.	Note	%±
1910	327		—
1920	432		32.1%
1930	429		−0.7%
1940	452		5.4%
1950	484		7.1%
1960	525		8.5%
1970	561		6.9%
1980	655		16.8%
1990	601		−8.2%
2000	615		2.3%
2010	680		10.6%
2020	660		−2.9%
U.S. Decennial Census

=== 2020 census ===
The 2020 United States census counted 660 people, 246 households, and 163 families in Pretty Prairie. The population density was 1,145.8 per square mile (442.4/km^{2}). There were 285 housing units at an average density of 494.8 per square mile (191.0/km^{2}). The racial makeup was 90.0% (594) white or European American (89.24% non-Hispanic white), 1.06% (7) black or African-American, 1.06% (7) Native American or Alaska Native, 0.15% (1) Asian, 0.0% (0) Pacific Islander or Native Hawaiian, 0.76% (5) from other races, and 6.97% (46) from two or more races. Hispanic or Latino of any race was 3.18% (21) of the population.

Of the 246 households, 30.1% had children under the age of 18; 47.2% were married couples living together; 28.5% had a female householder with no spouse or partner present. 30.9% of households consisted of individuals and 11.8% had someone living alone who was 65 years of age or older. The average household size was 2.4 and the average family size was 3.1. The percent of those with a bachelor's degree or higher was estimated to be 13.0% of the population.

26.4% of the population was under the age of 18, 4.7% from 18 to 24, 21.1% from 25 to 44, 24.1% from 45 to 64, and 23.8% who were 65 years of age or older. The median age was 42.5 years. For every 100 females, there were 115.0 males. For every 100 females ages 18 and older, there were 118.9 males.

The 2016–2020 5-year American Community Survey estimates show that the median household income was $51,053 (with a margin of error of +/- $8,934) and the median family income was $50,375 (+/- $18,218). Males had a median income of $32,212 (+/- $4,070) versus $22,750 (+/- $13,091) for females. The median income for those above 16 years old was $31,458 (+/- $1,582). Approximately, 10.9% of families and 13.0% of the population were below the poverty line, including 20.3% of those under the age of 18 and 7.5% of those ages 65 or over.

=== 2010 census ===
As of the census of 2010, there were 680 people, 272 households, and 190 families residing in the city. The population density was 1,214.3 inhabitants per square mile (468.8/km^{2}). There were 304 housing units at an average density of 542.9 per square mile (209.6/km^{2}). The racial makeup of the city was 96.0% White, 0.1% African American, 0.3% Native American, 0.1% Asian, 1.0% from other races, and 2.4% from two or more races. Hispanic or Latino people of any race were 3.1% of the population.

There were 272 households, of which 32.4% had children under the age of 18 living with them, 56.3% were married couples living together, 10.7% had a female householder with no husband present, 2.9% had a male householder with no wife present, and 30.1% were non-families. 27.6% of all households were made up of individuals, and 16.2% had someone living alone who was 65 years of age or older. The average household size was 2.36 and the average family size was 2.84.

The median age in the city was 42.4 years. 25.3% of residents were under the age of 18; 5.1% were between the ages of 18 and 24; 21.9% were from 25 to 44; 23.1% were from 45 to 64; and 24.6% were 65 years of age or older. The gender makeup of the city was 47.2% male and 52.8% female.

== Education ==
The community is served by Pretty Prairie USD 311 public school district. It has three schools.

== Transportation ==
The Atchison, Topeka and Santa Fe Railway formerly provided passenger rail service to Pretty Prairie on a line between Hutchinson and Ponca City. Dedicated passenger service was provided until at least 1954, while mixed trains continued until at least 1961. As of 2025, the nearest passenger rail station is located in Hutchinson, where Amtrak's Southwest Chief stops once daily on a route from Chicago to Los Angeles.

== Notable people ==
- Brian Bergkamp, member of the Kansas House of Representatives
- Jon Gnagy, artist and television art instructor
- Walter Huxman, governor of Kansas and jurist; born in Pretty Prairie
- Carl "Alfalfa" Switzer, actor; played Alfalfa on the Little Rascals/Our Gang series, lived in the town in 1954 while briefly married to Collingwood Grain heiress Dian Collingwood
- Jack Unruh, artist and illustrator

== In popular culture ==
- In the western television drama Gunsmoke, Pretty Prairie is the home of Betsy Burgess, portrayed by Brenda Scott, and the drifter "Painter," portrayed by Milton Selzer. Scott's and Selzer's characters appeared in the eighth season, twenty-sixth episode, entitled: "Anybody Can Kill a Marshall."

== See also ==
- Cheney State Park and Cheney Reservoir
