= Cheney State Park =

State park in Kansas, United States

- Location within Kansas Location within the United States
- Interactive map of Cheney State Park
- Location: Kingman and Reno counties, Kansas, United States
- Coordinates: 37°43′07″N 97°49′32″W
- Area: 1,913 acres (774 ha)
- Elevation: 1,421 ft (433 m)
- Established: 1964
- Administrator: Kansas Department of Wildlife and Parks
- Visitors: 631,188 (in 2022)
- Website: Official website
- Kansas State Parks

Cheney State Park is a state park of Kansas in the United States. Completed in 1964, the park is located in Kingman and Reno counties in Kansas, 5 miles north of Cheney and 20 miles west of Wichita.

The park is divided into two areas (37.733°N 97.840°W and 37.750°N 97.781°W), comprising 1,913 acres (7.74 km^{2}), straddling the 6,800-acre (28 km^{2}) Cheney Reservoir. The Ninnescah Sailing Association has facilities in the West Shore Area. A marina in the East Shore Area offers supplies and services for boaters and anglers.

There are nature and hiking trails at Giefer Creek and Spring Creek. A handicapped-accessible fishing complex is available at the Toadstool Loop Jetty.

The park features 29 miles of asphalt roads and parking areas; a park office; 2 marinas; 223 electrical hookup sites with water; over 400 primitive camp sites; 4 trailer dump stations; 6 boat ramps with 22 launching lanes; 4 courtesy docks; 2 fish cleaning stations; 7 modern pit toilets; 9 showerhouses; 1 shelter with restrooms; 2 large group shelters; 2 medium group shelters; 29 small picnic shelters; 1 group camping area with 20 utility sites, a large shelter and a restroom; 2 nature trails; and 7 modern cabins.

The 5,200-acre (21 km^{2}) Cheney Wildlife Area adjacent to the park provides opportunities for wildlife watching, nature photography, and hunting. A refuge has been set aside within the wildlife area for migratory waterfowl. The area is closed to all activities from September 15 through March 15, when it is reopened for fishing and non-hunting day use activities.

== See also ==
- List of Kansas state parks
- List of lakes, reservoirs, and dams in Kansas
- List of rivers of Kansas
