= Gile (disambiguation) =

Gile is a village in Warmian-Masurian Voivodeship, north-eastern Poland.

Gile may also refer to:

- Gile (surname), a family name
- Gilé, a Spanish card game
- Gilé District a district of Zambezia Province, Mozambique
