= Gile (surname) =

Gile is a surname. Notable people with the surname include:

- Dennis Gile (born 1981), American football player
- Don Gile (born 1935), American baseball player
- Frank S. Gile (1847–1898), American sailor
- Jacob M. Gile (1849–1937), American architect and builder
- Kenneth L. Gile (born 1947), American businessman
- Krista Gile, American statistician
- Mary Stuart Gile (1936-2019), American politician
- Ransom Henry Gile (1836–1916), American settler
- Selden Connor Gile (1877–1947), American painter
