= Rydal, Kansas =

Unincorporated community in Republic County, Kansas

Coordinates: 39°48′48″N 97°42′41″W

Rydal is an unincorporated community in Republic County, Kansas, United States. It is located between Belleville and Scandia at County Road 13 and U.S. Route 36.

== History ==
The post office in Rydal was discontinued in 1953.

== Education ==
The community is served by Pike Valley USD 426 public school district.
