= Sherdahl, Kansas =

Unincorporated community in Republic County, Kansas

Coordinates: 39°51′25″N 97°48′29″W

Sherdahl is a ghost town in Republic County, Kansas, United States. It is located four miles north of Scandia.

== History ==
A post office was opened in Sherahl in 1887, and remained in operation until it was discontinued in 1905.

== Education ==
The community is served by Pike Valley USD 426 public school district.
