= Norway, Kansas =

Unincorporated community in Republic County, Kansas

- Unincorporated community and CDP
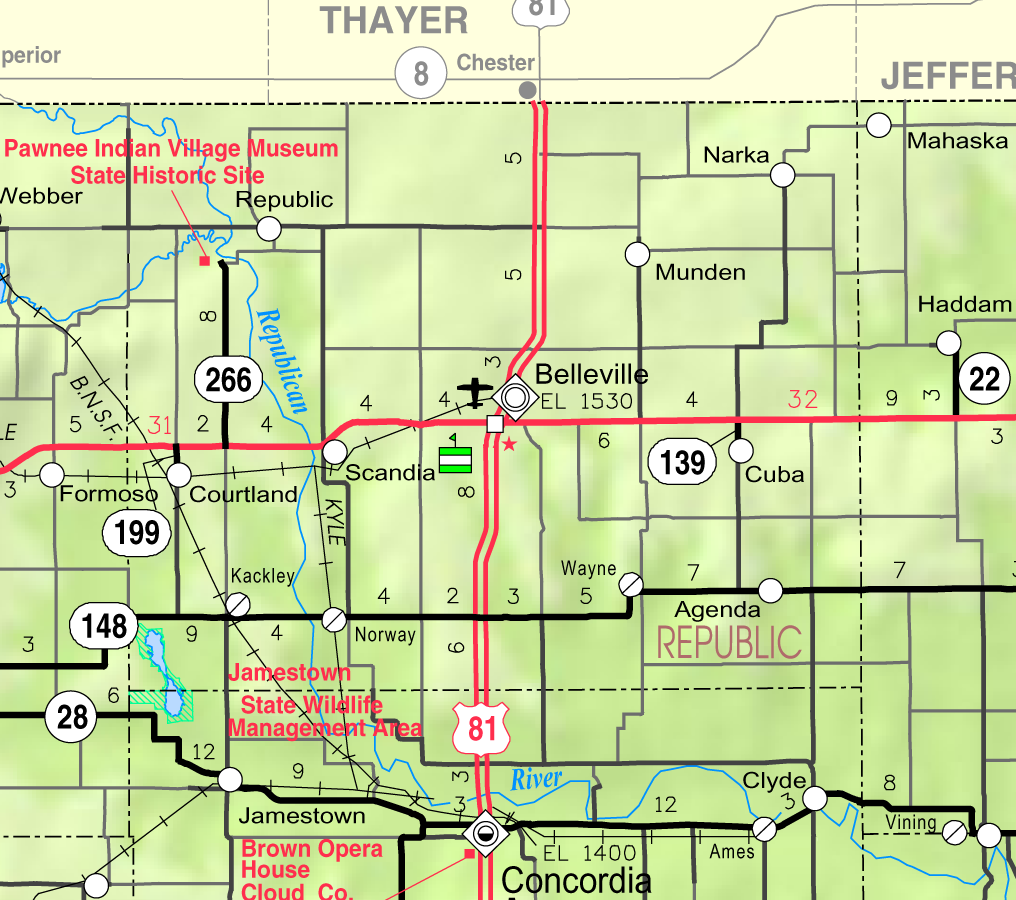
- KDOT map of Republic County (legend)

- Location within Kansas Location within the United States
- Coordinates: 39°41′48″N 97°46′26″W
- Country: United States
- State: Kansas
- County: Republic
- Founded: 1869
- Elevation: 1,411 ft (430 m)

Population (2020)
  - Total: 17
- Time zone: UTC-6 (CST)
  - Summer (DST): UTC-5 (CDT)
- Area code: 785
- FIPS code: 20-51550
- GNIS ID: 2804530

Norway is an unincorporated community and census-designated place (CDP) in Republic County, Kansas, United States. As of the 2020 census, the population was 17. It is located south of Scandia at Norway Lane and K-148 highway.

== History ==
The first post office in Norway was established in 1870.

== Demographics ==
Historical population
Census	Pop.	Note	%±
2020	17		—
U.S. Decennial Census

The 2020 United States census counted 17 people, 9 households, and 6 families in Norway. The population density was 7.5 per square mile (2.9/km^{2}). There were 14 housing units at an average density of 6.2 per square mile (2.4/km^{2}). The racial makeup was 100.0% (17) white or European American (100.0% non-Hispanic white), 0.0% (0) black or African-American, 0.0% (0) Native American or Alaska Native, 0.0% (0) Asian, 0.0% (0) Pacific Islander or Native Hawaiian, 0.0% (0) from other races, and 0.0% (0) from two or more races. Hispanic or Latino of any race was 0.0% (0) of the population.

Of the 9 households, 44.4% had children under the age of 18; 66.7% were married couples living together; 11.1% had a female householder with no spouse or partner present. 22.2% of households consisted of individuals and 22.2% had someone living alone who was 65 years of age or older. The average household size was 1.4 and the average family size was 2.7. The percent of those with a bachelor's degree or higher was estimated to be 0.0% of the population.

11.8% of the population was under the age of 18, 17.6% from 18 to 24, 29.4% from 25 to 44, 29.4% from 45 to 64, and 11.8% who were 65 years of age or older. The median age was 29.5 years. For every 100 females, there were 54.5 males. For every 100 females ages 18 and older, there were 36.4 males.

== Education ==
The community is served by Pike Valley USD 426 public school district.
