= Chicago International Airport =

Chicago International Airport may refer to:

- O'Hare International Airport, Chicago's largest airport and largest international gateway
- Chicago Midway International Airport, the first airport with that name
- Gary Chicago International Airport, an airport in Gary, Indiana
- Chicago Rockford International Airport
