= Westover Metropolitan Airport =

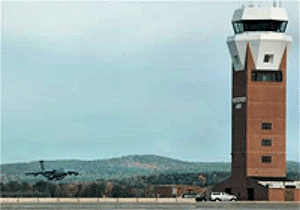
- IATA: CEF; ICAO: KCEF; FAA LID: CEF; WMO: 74491

Summary
- Airport type: Civil
- Owner: Westover Metropolitan Corporation
- Serves: Springfield, Massachusetts
- Location: Chicopee, Massachusetts; Ludlow, Massachusetts; Granby, Massachusetts
- Elevation AMSL: 241 ft (73 m)
- Coordinates: 42°11′38″N 072°32′05″W
- Website: westoverairport.com

Maps
- FAA Airport Diagram
- Interactive map of Westover Metropolitan Airport

Runways
Direction	Length		Surface
Direction	ft	m	Surface
5/23	11,597	3,535	Asphalt
15/33	7,085	2,160	Asphalt

Statistics (2022)
- Aircraft operations (year ending 5/31): 16,693
- Based aircraft: 37
- Source: Federal Aviation Administration

Westover Metropolitan Airport (IATA: CEF, ICAO: KCEF, FAA LID: CEF) is a civilian airport located in the Massachusetts communities of Chicopee, Granby, South Hadley and Ludlow, near the cities of Springfield and Holyoke, Massachusetts. The complex is considered intermodal because it borders the Massachusetts Turnpike and is accessible by several industrial rail spurs. It was named for General Oscar Westover, commanding officer of the Army Air Corps in the 1930s.

== Joint use ==
The Westover complex is composed of the civilian airport and the Westover Air Reserve Base. The core aviation facilities at Westover are owned by the Department of Defense while 91 acres (370,000 m^{2}) are under private ownership.

== History ==
Westover Field was created by a war-readiness appropriation signed by president Franklin D. Roosevelt in 1939. It became the largest military air facility in the Northeast during the course of World War II. The post-war Berlin Airlift was based in large part at Westover. It was renamed Westover Air Force Base after that agency's creation and became instrumental in waging the Cold War. The Eighth Air Force and its 99th Bombardment Wing were headquartered at Westover in order to provide range and support to nuclear bombers. As a former Strategic Air Command (SAC) B-52 and KC-135 base, this military center was one of the Soviet Union's top targets during the Cold War. The SAC constructed a secret underground bunker several miles away in Hadley, Massachusetts, to coordinate Westover's operations during a nuclear war. The command post was linked to the main base by buried cables and microwave antennae. The U-2 spy plane film that set off the Cuban Missile Crisis was developed at Westover. It was a base of operations for the Air Force in both the Korean War and the Vietnam War. Bombing and cargo missions in Vietnam were made directly from Westover. Eight fully armed nuclear bombers stood ready in Christmas tree formation to scramble if a conflict broke out with the Soviet Union.

In 1974, as the last Vietnam War veterans stepped onto Westover's tarmac, the base was turned over to the Air Force Reserve. The decision followed four years after the Eighth Air Force was moved from Westover by President Richard Nixon.

On May 30, 2007, Skybus Airlines announced it would begin once-daily flights to Columbus, OH utilizing 144-seat Airbus A319 jets. On July 16, 2007, the first revenue flight bound for Columbus took off from Westover. This marked the first commercial service at the airport since the late 1980s. Due to Skybus ceasing all operations on April 4, 2008, the airport was yet again without commercial service.

On August 3, 2023, Reney Tours announced they would resume charter flights to Atlantic City from Westover; using a 183-seat Boeing 737-800 operated by Sun Country.

== Economic impact ==
The local government credits Westover with spurring development of the Memorial Drive corridor, including several planned hotels and a high-end retail plaza.

== Civilian use ==
Westover Metropolitan Airport is the civilian component of the complex. It is owned and managed by the non-profit Westover Metropolitan Corporation, established in 1974 to develop property surplused by the General Services Administration. An area of 91 acres (370,000 m^{2}) of the property has been operated since that time as a public use, regional civilian airport. The United States Air Force extends military-grade air traffic control and firefighting/rescue services to civilian users.

== Airlines and destinations ==
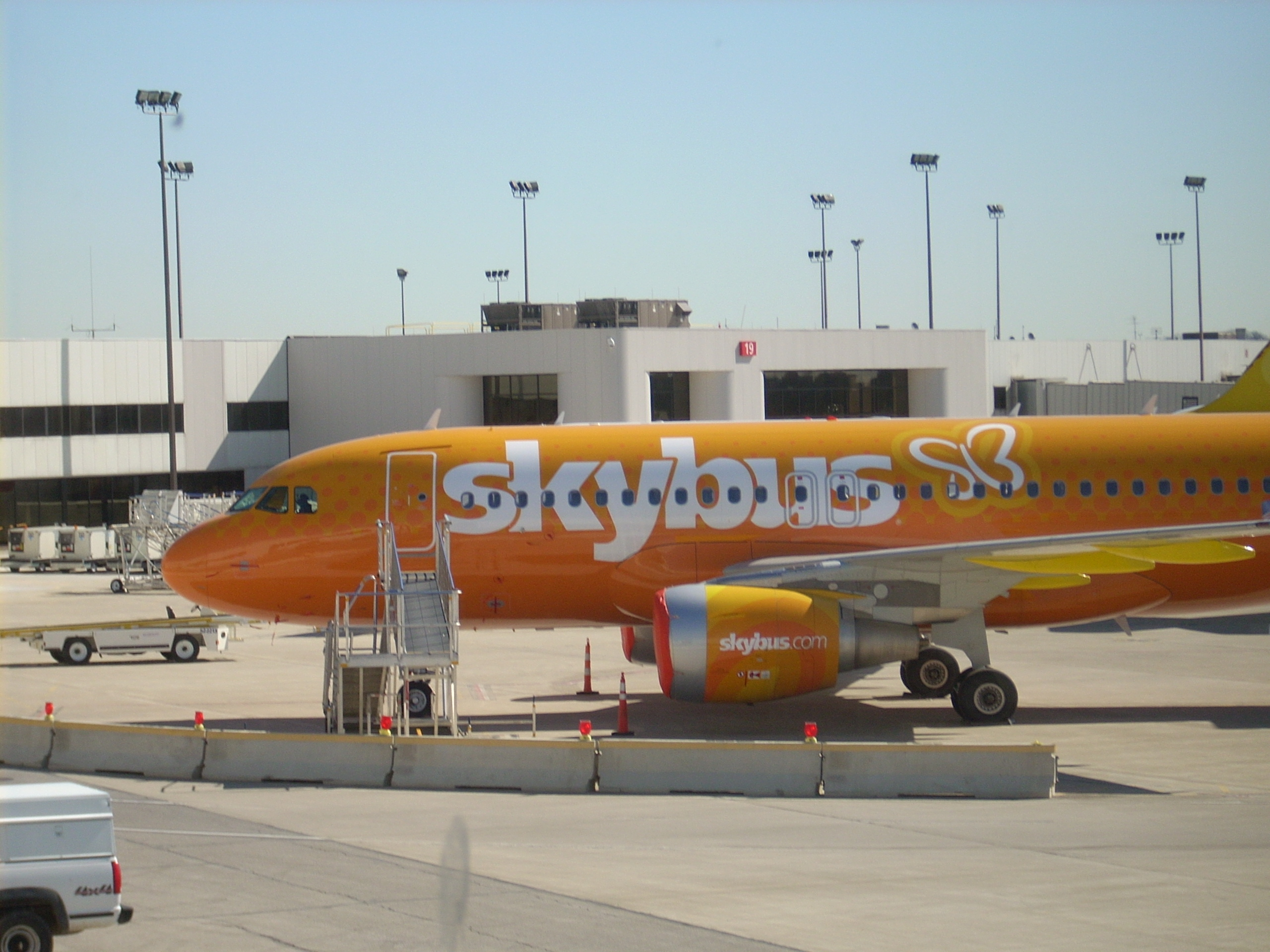
Skybus Airlines (pictured at Port Columbus International Airport) was the last airline to operate scheduled commercial service at the airport, in 2008.

The airport is currently looking to receive new commercial service from an airline.

=== Historical service ===
- Skybus Airlines to Columbus and Greensboro, 2007–2008

== Facilities and aircraft ==
Aerial view of airport

Westover Metropolitan Airport contains a full-service passenger terminal, including Transportation Security Administration security facilities. The facility was built in 1989 in order to host several commuter airlines and is still operational today.

- Long-term and short-term parking is available.
- Parking shuttles and hotel shuttles are provided at no cost.

Facility upgrades were paid for by Massachusetts taxpayers, but since the collapse of Skybus the passenger terminal has been empty.

The Westover complex covers an area of 2,500 acres (10 km²) which contains two runways: 5/23: measuring 11,597 x 300 ft (3,535 x 91 m) and 15/33 measuring 7,085 x 150 ft (2,160 x 46 m). At nearly 11,600 feet long, runway 5/23 is the longest runway in all of New England. A new Air Traffic Control tower was constructed in 2002 and the old tower was demolished.

According to FAA records for the 12-month period ending May 31, 2022, the airport had 16,693 aircraft operations, an average of 46 per day: 60% military, 36% general aviation, 4% air taxi, and <1% commercial. There were 37 aircraft based at the time at this airport: 16 military, 10 single engine, 4 multi-engine, 3 jet aircraft, 2 gliders and 2 helicopter.

General aviation services are provided by Metro Air Services.

== Accidents at or near CEF ==
- On August 12, 1953, a United States Navy R6D (Douglas DC-6) crashed soon after takeoff when at 200 feet (60 m) the aircraft banked and struck the ground, cartwheeled, and burned. All four occupants died.
- On June 27, 1958, a USAF Boeing KC-135 Stratotanker apparently stalled and crashed because the crew failed to retract the flaps from 40 to 30 degrees during climbout. The plane skidded across the Massachusetts Turnpike, disintegrated, and burned. The aircraft was attempting a world speed record from New York to London with three other KC-135's. All fifteen occupants were killed, including six civilian newsmen.
- On June 21, 1963, a USAF Boeing KC-135 Stratotanker crashed into a hillside 5.9 miles (9.5 km) north of Westover during an instrument final approach in heavy rain. One occupant out of the four on board died.
