= Skybus Airlines =

Airline of the United States (2004–2007)

IATA	ICAO	Call sign
SX	SKB	SKYBUS
- Founded: 2004
- Commenced operations: May 22, 2007
- Ceased operations: April 5, 2008
- Hubs: John Glenn Columbus International Airport
- Secondary hubs: Piedmont Triad International Airport
- Fleet size: 12 (63 firm orders at time of shutdown)
- Destinations: 17
- Headquarters: Columbus, Ohio, United States
- Key people: Mike Hodge (CEO & CFO); Kenneth L. Gile (President & COO); Charlie Clifton (Board of Managers)
- Founder: John Weikle
- Website: skybus.com

Skybus Airlines Inc. was a privately held airline based in Columbus, Ohio, United States. It operated as an ultra low-cost carrier modeled after the European airline Ryanair, and aimed to be the least expensive airline in the United States. The business model was heavily reliant on flying routes where other airlines did not have direct flights, as Ryanair did in Europe, thus keeping competition to a minimum, and on flying into secondary airports, rather than heavily trafficked ones.

The airline also sold advertising space on the interior and exterior of its aircraft, as well as selling merchandise on board. Skybus applied for operating approval on January 1, 2005, received approval to operate on March 15, 2006, and FAA certification on May 10, 2007. It had been granted a waiver to begin ticket sales on April 24, 2007; Skybus' first passenger flights out of Columbus began on May 22, 2007. Less than a year later, Skybus announced on April 4, 2008, that it would cease operations as of April 5, citing the lagging economy and rising fuel costs as causes.

== History ==
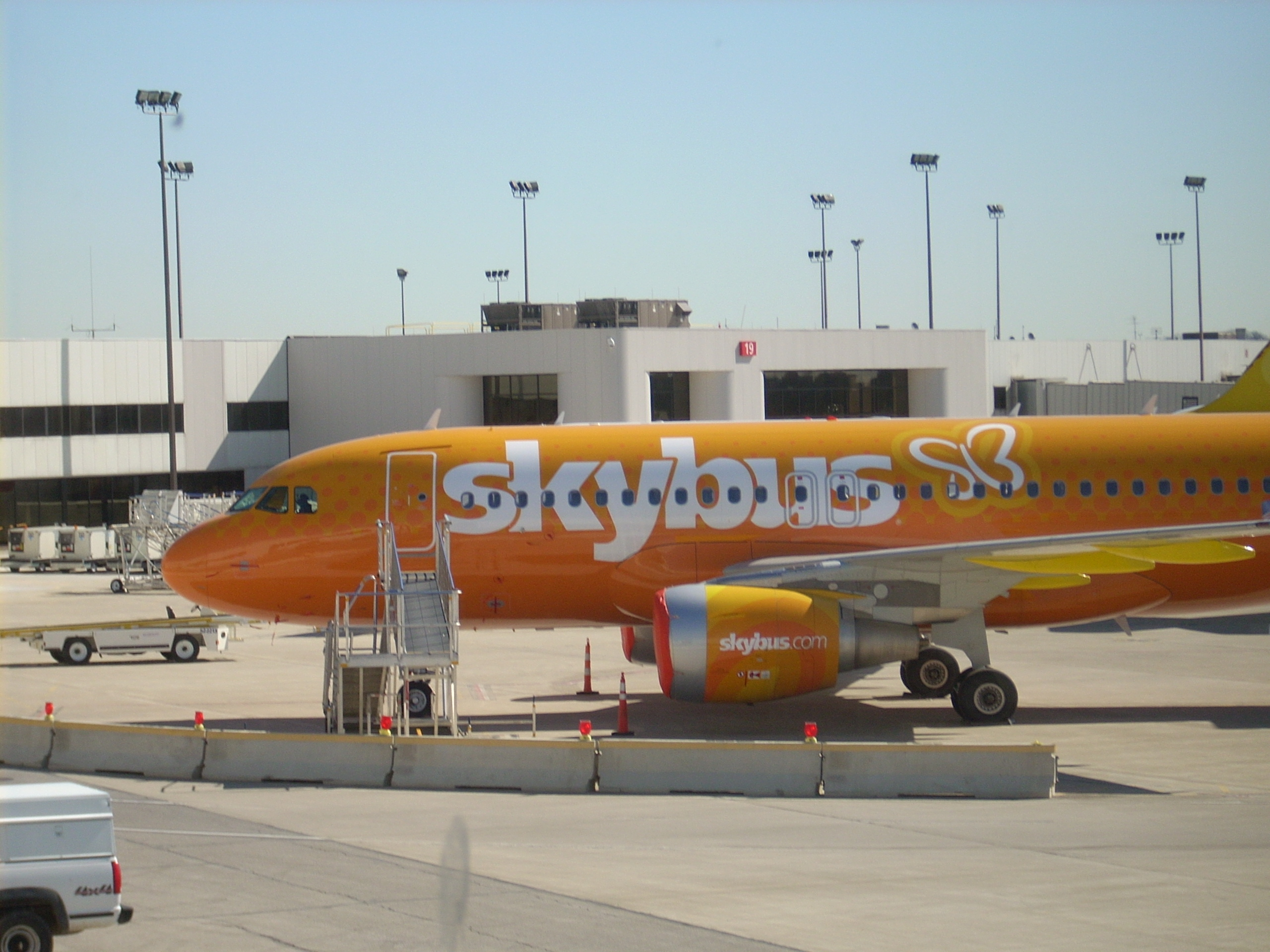
A Skybus Airlines Airbus A319 at Port Columbus International Airport.

Taking advantage of America West Airlines pulling down its Columbus, Ohio hub, its founder, John Weikle, started raising capital to start the airline in that city. Two years later, the Skybus board hired Bill Diffenderffer as its CEO. Diffenderffer's prior airline experience was as in-house counsel for Eastern Airlines and CEO of Continental Airlines System One Reservations. At the time Skybus began operations it was the most heavily capitalized (funded) airline in US history. Its founder, John Weikle, resigned one day after Skybus began its first passenger flights.

On April 24, 2007, Skybus Airlines announced their initial set of eight destinations, all of which originated from their hub at Port Columbus International Airport in Columbus. At first, Skybus operated a strict point-to-point service, not booking flights between destination cities that were not Columbus, but the company later announced it would begin flying direct flights from its Portsmouth, NH, destination to two locations in Florida. In addition, prices of tickets and details on extra fees were announced the same day. Service between Port Columbus and the other eight destinations began on May 22, and the airline also announced its intention to expand rapidly.

The expansion plans were not envisioned in the original business plan, and, in some instances, it expanded to cities that management did not choose on the basis of computer models used with its initial destination cities (Chattanooga, TN, for example). As part of its business model, Skybus favored smaller, cheaper airports near major markets. To serve Boston, for example, Skybus chose Portsmouth (New Hampshire) International Airport. Skybus marketed itself as an ultra-low-cost carrier, selling ten seats on each flight for $10. The low fares came with a reduction of frills. There were charges for virtually everything else (see Skybus business model), including checked baggage charges, which were later implemented by other carriers such as Delta, Northwest and United.

On July 24, 2007, the U.S. Department of Transportation granted Skybus the right to fly international flights to Cancún, Mexico and Nassau, Bahamas. Two months later, the airline announced that it would begin daily service from Portsmouth to St. Augustine and Fort Myers, Florida, served by the Charlotte County Airport in Punta Gorda in December 2007.

The airline made news during the Christmas 2007 travel season, when it encountered problems with two of its seven planes, resulting in the cancellation of about 25% of its scheduled service over a two-day period. As a result of not having de-icing contracts in place in advance of winter 2007–08, Skybus was forced to take significant delays and incurred thousands of dollars in additional de-icing costs. On March 24, 2008, Skybus announced that chief executive Bill Diffenderffer had resigned to return to his previous occupation as an author.

== Destinations ==
As of Friday, April 4, 2008, its last day of operation, Skybus provided service to 17 destinations throughout the continental United States:

From Columbus (Port Columbus International Airport):

- Burbank (Bob Hope Airport)
- Chattanooga (Chattanooga Metropolitan Airport)
- Chicago (Gary/Chicago International Airport)
- Springfield (Westover Metropolitan Airport)
- Fort Lauderdale (Fort Lauderdale-Hollywood International Airport)
- Gulfport/Biloxi (Gulfport-Biloxi International Airport)
- Kansas City (Kansas City International Airport)
- Milwaukee (General Mitchell International Airport)
- Newburgh (Stewart International Airport)
- Oakland (Oakland International Airport)
- Greensboro/High Point (Piedmont Triad International Airport)
- Portsmouth (Pease International Airport)
- Punta Gorda (Charlotte County Airport)
- Richmond (Richmond International Airport)
- St. Augustine (Northeast Florida Regional Airport)
- Wilmington (Wilmington-Philadelphia Regional Airport)

From Greensboro/High Point (Piedmont Triad International Airport):

- Burbank (Bob Hope Airport)
- Chicago (Gary/Chicago International Airport)
- Chicopee (Westover Metropolitan Airport)
- Columbus (Port Columbus International Airport)
- Fort Lauderdale (Fort Lauderdale-Hollywood International Airport)
- Gulfport/Biloxi (Gulfport-Biloxi International Airport)
- Newburgh (Stewart International Airport)
- Portsmouth (Pease International Airport)
- Punta Gorda (Charlotte County Airport)
- St. Augustine (Northeast Florida Regional Airport)
- Wilmington (Wilmington-Philadelphia Regional Airport)

== Timeline ==
Skybus conducted its inaugural flight on May 22, 2007, when the airline began flights from the Port Columbus, OH base. The first service that did not have a Columbus end point began December 17, 2007, when Skybus began flights between Portsmouth and St. Augustine as well as Punta Gorda, Florida.

On October 16, 2007, Skybus announced it was eliminating service to San Diego and Bellingham, and cutting one flight a day to Burbank. The cuts were made due to rising fuel costs as it was more cost effective to use the current fleet on shorter and more profitable runs.

At the same time, Skybus said it would add a second daily flight to Greensboro, North Carolina, which was now its second focus city, and a third seasonal daily flight to Punta Gorda, Florida.

On October 22, 2007, Skybus announced the opening of a new hub at Piedmont Triad International Airport in Greensboro, North Carolina.

On January 8. 2008, Service began in New York (Stewart International Airport/Newburgh, NY),

On February 6, 2008, Skybus announced that it would end service to the West Coast effective in June, except for a single daily nonstop to Burbank.

On March 8, 2008, Skybus landed its first flight at Wilmington-Philadelphia Regional Airport, south of Wilmington, Delaware, a less congested alternative to Philadelphia International Airport. Many travelers in the Philadelphia area preferred the smaller airport without the congestion issues of Philadelphia International Airport. Skybus announced on March 19, 2008, that "previously announced service between Columbus and Niagara Falls, NY, [before it even started], as well as a previously announced second daily flight between Columbus and Milwaukee, will not begin." Also announced was all service to/from Chattanooga, TN, would end on April 14, 2008, along with a cut from two to one daily flight from Greensboro, NC, and Wilmington, DE, and elimination of the Greensboro, NC, and Gulfport-Biloxi, MS, flight.

On April 4, 2008, Skybus announced the cessation of all flights effective with the last scheduled departure of the day. Service was set to begin on June 1, 2008, between Boston (Portsmouth, NH), Springfield, MA, (Chicopee, MA), Punta Gorda, FL, St. Augustine, FL, and Richmond, VA.

== Business model ==
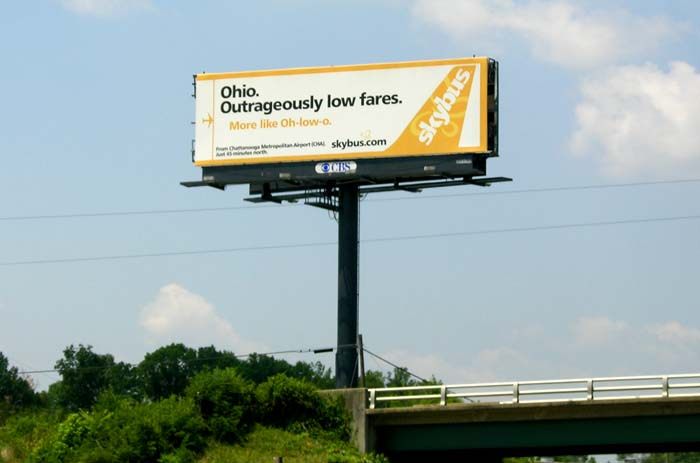
Billboard for service between Chattanooga and Columbus on I-75

Attempting to emulate Ryanair's business model and Southwest's people-friendly attitude (often considered at odds in comparisons of the two airlines), Skybus had committed itself to be the least expensive airline in the industry with a projected CASM 28% lower than Southwest. To achieve this, Skybus planned to utilize multiple measures designed to increase revenue and decrease costs, many of which were used by Spirit Airlines.

=== Fares ===
Advertised fares to all of the former target cities began at US$10 one-way; the price increased as more tickets were sold for that flight. Advertisements suggest that ten seats on each flight were sold at the promotional $10 fare. Other fares promoted by Skybus included a $20.08 fare sale (plus fees and taxes) to some of the airline's less popular destinations, to celebrate the New Year. Ticket prices for the remaining fares were expected to be around half the price of other airlines. These fares did not include taxes and other airport fees, however, which add about $10 to a one-way ticket. All fees included, the cheapest round-trip ticket for one adult would have cost approximately $40.

=== Additional charges ===
Skybus charged extra fees for almost everything other than the ticket itself. This is common among European low-cost carriers, but was almost unheard of at the time among major US carriers. Carry-on baggage (one bag plus one personal item) was free, but checked bags incurred an additional charge. The first two bags less than fifty pounds were $10 each online or $12 each at the counter, with each additional bag after two incurring a charge of $50 per bag. Overweight baggage, those weighing over fifty but under seventy-five pounds, was charged an extra $25, and all bags over seventy-five pounds were not accepted. Skybus did not through-check luggage onto connecting flights. Customers connecting on Skybus flights in Columbus were required to collect any checked luggage, then re-check it in Columbus for the second flight. Even though Skybus did not through-check luggage, delayed luggage was a continuing problem for its outsourced ground crews.

Seating was first-come, first-served. Passengers paid an extra $10 per person per direction for priority seating, which allowed a passenger to board right after passengers with disabilities. On board, everything from food and drinks to pillows had an additional charge; once purchased, items did not need to be returned. In order to maximize revenue from these fees, Skybus attempted to strictly enforce its no outside food and drink policy. The airline required passengers dispose of food and drink before boarding the plane. Exceptions included baby formula or baby food, special food for those with a medical condition such as diabetes or severe food allergies, or those with dietary restrictions (Kosher, Halal, etc.).

=== Cost reduction ===
In an effort to keep maintenance and operating costs to a minimum, most equipment purchased was uniform. This covered the full range of equipment, from engines, to electrical components, to personnel gear. Because of this, Skybus planned on paying significantly less on employee training and for equipment service.

Another major method of cost reduction was to utilize secondary airports, which are generally less congested and charge less to lease space though they may be farther from the advertised destination. To save even more money at the airport, passengers boarded directly from the apron instead of using the jetway, saving both loading/unloading time as well as operating costs. Finally, ticket sales were entirely online. This not only saved on employee costs, but completely eliminated the need for a reservations call center.

=== Employee wages ===
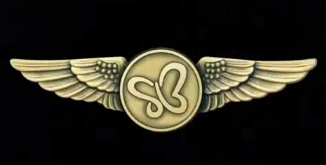
Uniform wings of Skybus Flight Attendants with the butterfly/SB logo.

Flight attendants were paid $9 per flight hour, and were not paid a per diem. While this was considerably lower than competing airlines' wages, flight attendants also received 10% of all sales made during the flight, splitting all commissions evenly among all flight attendants on board.

Starting pilot wages were also well below average in terms of hourly rate, starting at $65,000 annually for Captains, and $30,000 for First Officers as a minimum guarantee. The average captain's earnings were about $90,000 vs $120,000 per year for a theoretical first year Captain at airlines like United Airlines (there is no first year pay at United) but in the case of Skybus this included a significant stock options and profit share package unique in the airline industry. Additionally unusual for Skybus flight crew was that there were very few if any overnight trips thus giving the crew far fewer hours away from home (known as TAFB or time away from base) and higher crew utilization rates for more efficient work schedules. Typical Skybus pilot workdays were 8–10 hours long (FAA maximum is 16 hours), which was lower than the industry average of 12–14 hours. Typical pilot work months were 14–15 days with no overnights. The average pilot in the US has a work month of 16–17 days, and the average airline pilot wage is approximately $135,000 averaged between first officer and captain pay.

Skybus was one of the few 100% non-union airlines in the United States at the time of its shutdown (among mainline airlines, only JetBlue Airways was 100% non-union at the time, but its pilots are now represented by ALPA). However, it was facing a union organizing campaign from its pilots, who had collected enough signatures to hold a union referendum. The pilots were seeking to join Local 747 of the International Brotherhood of Teamsters, based in Houston, Texas. Because of the number of signatures collected, it was presumed that the campaign would be successful. The election would have most likely occurred sometime in April 2008. Successful unionization could have severely undermined Skybus's below-market compensation philosophy and laid the framework for union activity among other Skybus employee groups. (Note that there is precedent for unionized pilots with most other employee groups remaining non-union, as is the case at Delta Air Lines.)

=== Ancillary revenue ===
While cutting costs was a high priority for Skybus, revenue was their primary focus. Skybus aircraft were outfitted as flying gift shops, selling soda, food, perfumes, handbags, jewelry, watches, clothing, and toiletries. Customers could purchase these items duty-free on board the aircraft. Seen in this photo is a flight attendant during the gift sales portion of a flight.

Advertisements could also be seen throughout the cabin and exterior. This could include overhead bins, carpet, tray tables, and full-body exterior advertisements (see below). The price for interior advertisements was not released, though a company who purchased a full-body advertisement could also buy all interior advertisements for a small increase in price. A complete list of where advertisements were to be placed was not released.

== Shutdown and bankruptcy ==
Soon after the departures of several top managers, on April 4, 2008, Skybus announced they were shutting down all flight operations. The airline also said it would seek Chapter 11 bankruptcy protection. A statement on its website regarding the shutdown said that "Skybus struggled to overcome the combination of rising jet fuel costs and a slowing economic environment. These two issues proved to be insurmountable for a new carrier." Skybus was the fourth United States-based airline to shut down or announce future plans to shut down the week of March 31, 2008, following Aloha Airlines' passenger operations, ATA Airlines and charter airline Champion Air (the latter of which announced a voluntarily liquidation that would take effect on May 31). At the time of the shutdown, Skybus employed about 450 people, mostly in the Columbus, Ohio, area. Almost all were immediately laid off. Passengers were also left stranded before they could complete their round trip flights.

Port Columbus did not face harsh losses from the airline's shutdown, because the vacant space allowed existing airlines at Port Columbus to expand and add more service. With the addition of a nonstop flight from Columbus to Los Angeles operated by Delta Air Lines, Columbus now had non-stop flights to all of the major airline hubs in the United States. Their vacancy also made room for AirTran Airways.

== Fleet ==
On October 26, 2006, Skybus announced a deal with the European aircraft manufacturer Airbus to buy 65 of its Airbus A319 aircraft. The order carried an estimated retail price of $3.7 billion, though the actual price Skybus would have paid had not been announced. Additionally, the aircraft were going to come with a 12-year maintenance agreement that was new for Airbus and Skybus was the launch customer for this service plan which helped them manage maintenance costs. Additionally, the aircraft would have been equipped with the latest in EFB (electronic flight bags) and HUD (heads up display) technology, as well as TCAS II terrain and traffic avoidance technology which is integrated in with an EGPWS technology box that protects from terrain collision. Skybus planned to lease aircraft of the same type until the new aircraft were to begin delivery in late 2008.

On February 14, 2007, Skybus announced they had chosen the CFM56-5B engine built by CFM International to power the 65 A319 aircraft on order from Airbus. The actual price Skybus would have paid for the engines was not disclosed, but the list price for the order is estimated at over $750 million.

== Livery and advertising ==
Original images of a livery design described by some as "psychedelic" emerged on the internet, but since then the all orange design displaying the butterfly logo on the tail made its appearance on the Columbus tarmac. The butterfly logo incorporates the letters "SB" for Skybus. This design was not the standard livery for all Skybus aircraft, however, as its airplanes were available as "branded airplanes" to any company that paid $500,000 per year for this. A branded airplane featured a full-body advertisement along the fuselage, with the tail and engines of the plane remaining in the Skybus paint scheme. The first sponsored aircraft, aircraft N522VA leased from Virgin America, promoted the theme "Nationwide is on Your Side" Nationwide Mutual Insurance Company. It was created by an airplane media company, SkyBrand, based in Seattle. Skybus had also had some self-advertising on the orange tails of its white planes that read, "Skybus. $10 Fares ... Only Birds Fly Cheaper." The company's standard font was Frutiger, itself created for the travel industry in 1974 for Charles de Gaulle Airport in Paris, France.

The first leased aircraft for Skybus that came from Virgin America, had 144 seats on board, and flew with three flight attendants. Flight attendant uniforms were also used as a means of advertising. The uniforms for both male and female flight attendants consisted of black shoes, black casual dress pants with black long sleeve T-shirts. The front and back of the T-shirts would advertise a Skybus focus city, along with an advertising slogan specific to that city or a generic Skybus ad phrase. Flight attendants purchased their own uniforms and were allowed to choose and wear the T-shirt style of their choice. Captain and First Officer uniforms did not have advertising and were of traditional airline style (olive green shirts with epaulettes and black ties).

== Criticisms ==
Skybus hubs (CMH and GSO) did not provide connection opportunities for passengers. Skybus highly discouraged connections; as such, passengers wishing to interchange at hubs would have to move bags between flights (on their own) as bags could not be checked on a multi-segment itinerary.

== Startup incentives ==
In an effort to attract the airline to the city, as well as support its growth early on, the city of Columbus, along with the Columbus Regional Airport Authority, had offered incentives totaling over $57 million. These incentives included a twelve-year tax credit, promised airport improvements, business loans, and marketing support. Most of the incentives were performance-based, which required Skybus to create 1000 jobs and complete other milestones to receive the incentives. Incentives such as airport improvements, however, were already completed. When Skybus began operations, they took advantage of $11 million of improvements to their gates in Concourse B at Port Columbus.

== Financing ==
Skybus was financed by numerous high-profile companies nationwide and locally. As of April 2, 2007, Skybus had raised an estimated $160 million in startup capital which includes $72.7 million in their second round of fund raising. That was among the largest amounts of start-up funding in the history of airlines. By comparison, JetBlue Airways, which began operations in 1999, raised $130 million prior to starting ($157 million adjusted for inflation).

=== Investors ===
Skybus Airlines' startup finances were provided by a number of large investors. These included Fidelity Investments (12.6% ownership), Morgan Stanley (6.4%), Nationwide Mutual Capital (5%), and Tiger Management (4.1%). Smaller investors included: Huntington Capital Investment Co., Wolfe Enterprises (former owner of The Columbus Dispatch, WBNS-TV, and WTHR-TV), and Battelle Services Co. Inc.

=== Financial performance ===
Skybus reported a loss of $16 million during its first three months of operation. A Skybus spokesman said that these results were "in line" with expectations for an airline startup. During that period, Skybus planes were 79% full, placing the airline sixteenth highest among 96 reporting airlines. Passenger yield for the quarter was 5.08 cents/mile, compared with Southwest's 12.50 cents/mile and the 13.00-cent/mile average among major national carriers.

== See also ==
- List of defunct airlines of the United States
