= Krista Gile =

American statistician

Krista Jennifer Gile is an American statistician known for her research on respondent-driven sampling, on exponential random graph models, and more generally on the statistical behavior of social networks. She is an associate professor in the department of mathematics and statistics of the University of Massachusetts Amherst.

== Education and career ==
Gile grew up in Shrewsbury, Vermont, where her father Richard H. Gile was an engineer and businessman. She graduated in 1998 from the Rensselaer Polytechnic Institute, where she majored in electrical engineering with a minor in sociology. After earning a master's degree in science and technology studies at Virginia Tech in 2000, she worked from 2000 to 2003 as Assistant Director of Research at Advocates for Human Potential, Inc. In this period, she also continued to take graduate classes, delivered meals for the poor and taught mathematics to underprivileged girls.

At the suggestion of an amateur rugby teammate and with the encouragement of a sociological theory professor, she returned to graduate school, studying statistics at the University of Washington, where she completed her doctorate in 2008. Her dissertation, Inference from Partially-Observed Network Data, was supervised by Mark S. Handcock. After two years as a Postdoctoral Prize Research Fellow at Nuffield College, Oxford, she joined the UMass Amherst faculty in 2010.
