= SkyValue =

American low-cost airline

IATA	ICAO	Call sign
XP	CXP	RUBY MOUNTAIN
- Founded: December 15, 2006; 19 years ago
- Ceased operations: May 7, 2007; 19 years ago
- Hubs: Gary/Chicago International Airport
- Fleet size: 1
- Destinations: 5
- Parent company: Sky Value Ltd.
- Headquarters: Fort Lauderdale, Florida
- Key people: Robert Masson (President); Donald Millroy (COO); Gabrielle Griswold Brandt( Senior Executive Vice President)
- Website: Skyvalue.com

SkyValue, formally known as SkyValue USA, was a seasonal American low-cost airline that was headquartered in Fort Lauderdale, Florida, and for the 2006–07 winter season, its only season of operations, operated from a hub at Gary/Chicago International Airport (GYY) in Gary, Indiana, which lies 25 miles southeast of the Chicago Loop.

== History ==
On October 13, 2006, Sky Value USA, part of C First Class Corp.brand, announced that it would begin flights on 737-800 aircraft beginning December from Gary/Chicago International Airport to five "sunny" locations offering 5 flights a day. Service from December 15, 2006, to April 2007 was offered as a test run, with service to continue if it was proved successful. The winter season was extremely successful with over 10,000 passengers which made possible federal grants awarded to support the cost and expansion of the Gary Airport to become Chicago's "3rd" airport. SkyValue was operated as a "scheduled charter" service, with aircraft wet leased from Xtra Airways

The tour operator added a third weekly flight from its hub at Gary/Chicago International Airport to the airline's most popular destination, Mesa, Arizona which is located in the Phoenix area.

On April 27, 2007, SkyValue's CEO announced they would be ending service as planned to all destinations on May 6, 2007, and would consider providing the service for the next season.

== Destinations ==
Route Map of SkyValue (as of May 6, 2007)

During the 2006–07 winter season, SkyValue flew to five destinations in the United States.

=== United States ===
==== Arizona ====
- Phoenix/Mesa (Phoenix-Mesa Gateway Airport) winter-only seasonal service

==== Florida ====
- Orlando (Orlando International Airport)
- St. Petersburg/Clearwater (St. Petersburg-Clearwater International Airport)

==== Indiana ====
- Gary (Gary/Chicago International Airport) Hub

==== Nevada ====
- Las Vegas (McCarran International Airport)

== Schedule ==
During its only year of operation, SkyValue operated the following schedule:

SkyValue Schedule (as of May 6, 2007)
Day of Week	Route
Sunday	Gary/Chicago – St. Petersburg/Clearwater – Orlando – Gary/Chicago; Gary/Chicago – Las Vegas – Gary/Chicago
Monday	Gary/Chicago – Mesa/Phoenix – Gary/Chicago
Tuesday	No routes scheduled
Wednesday	Gary/Chicago – Mesa/Phoenix – Gary/Chicago
Thursday	Gary/Chicago – St. Petersburg/Clearwater – Orlando – Gary/Chicago; Gary/Chicago – Las Vegas – Gary/Chicago
Friday	Gary/Chicago – Mesa/Phoenix – Gary/Chicago
Saturday	Gary/Chicago – St. Petersburg/Clearwater – Orlando – Gary/Chicago

== Fleet ==
When SkyValue began scheduled passenger service on December 15, 2006, they originally operated a Boeing 737-800 aircraft which was wet leased from Xtra Airways. The airline kept this aircraft until April 23, 2007, when the 737-800 (in all economy class configuration) was returned to Xtra Airways for a smaller Boeing 737-400 aircraft (in a business/economy class configuration). SkyValue has optioned for a year-long lease on the 737-400 which expired in April 2008.

SkyValue Retired Fleet
Aircraft	Passengers (Business/Economy)	Routes	Notes
Boeing 737-400	150 (12/138)	All	wet leased from Xtra Airways; Returned in May 2007
Boeing 737-800	174 (0/174)	All	wet leased from Xtra Airways; Returned in April 2007

== See also ==
- List of defunct airlines of the United States
