= Pike Valley USD 426 =

Public school district in Scandia, Kansas

Address
- 100 School Street Scandia, Kansas, 66966; United States
- Coordinates: 39.7981°N 97.7769°W

District information
- Type: Public
- Grades: K to 12

Other information
- Website: pikevalley.com

Pike Valley USD 426 is a public unified school district headquartered in Scandia, Kansas, United States. The district includes the communities of Scandia, Courtland, Kackley, Norway, Rydal, Sherdahl, and nearby rural areas.

== Schools ==
The school district operates the following schools:

- Pike Valley Jr High/High School (7-12) - 100 School St in Scandia
- Pike Valley Elementary School (K-6) - 502 Grant St in Courtland

== See also ==
- Kansas State Department of Education
- Kansas State High School Activities Association
- List of high schools in Kansas
- List of unified school districts in Kansas
