= Richard B. Wilke =

American Methodist bishop (1930–2025)

Richard B. Wilke (June 18, 1930 – April 20, 2025) was an American Methodist bishop and writer.

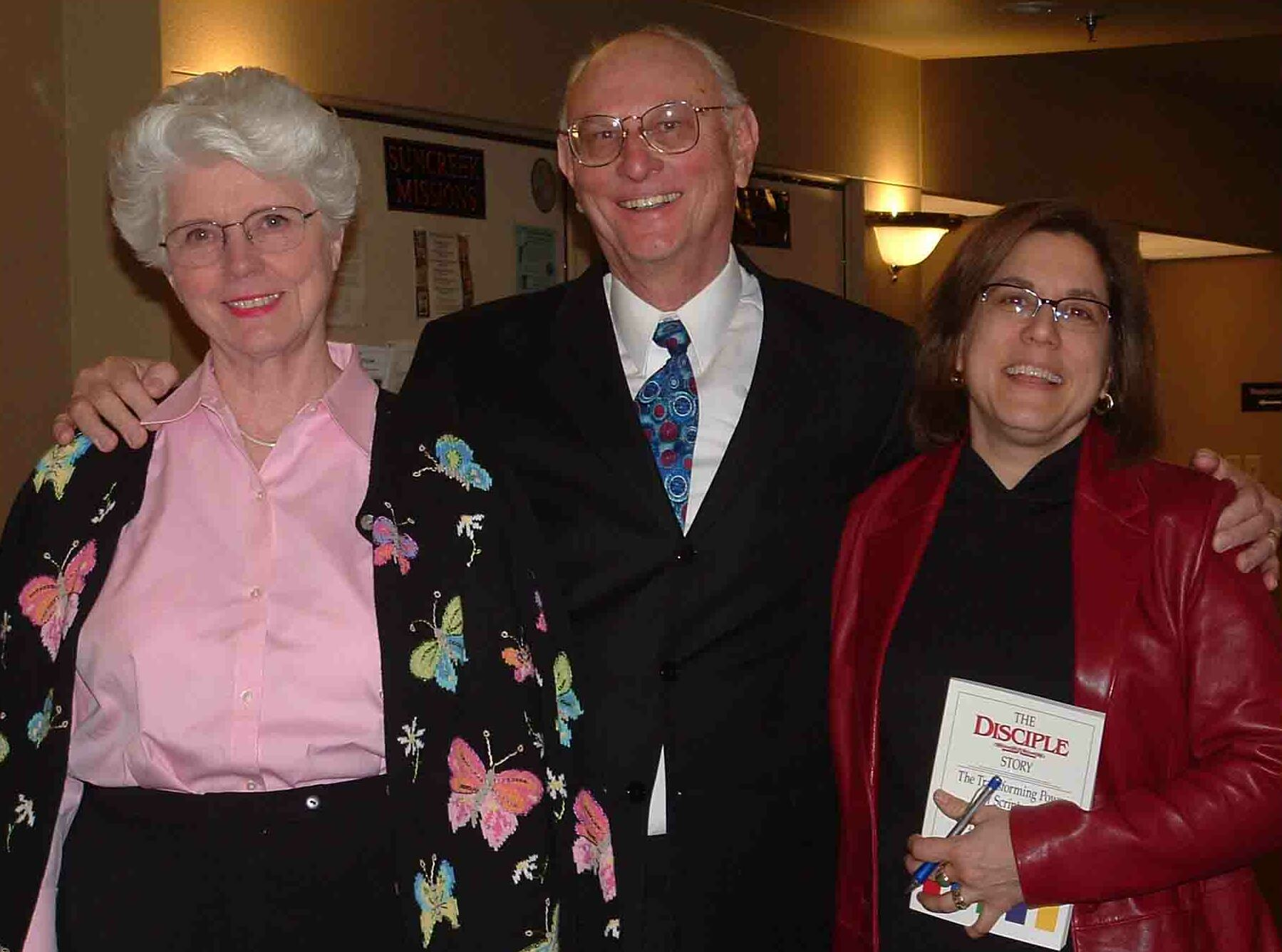
Julia Wilke (his wife), Bishop Richard B. Wilke, and Nancy Kruh (Author of a book about The Disciple Bible Study) at Suncreek United Methodist Church (Allen, TX) in 2005.

== Life and career ==
Wilke served as District Superintendent of the Winfield District in the Kansas Conference from 1971 to 1973. He was elected to the episcopacy of the United Methodist Church in 1984, and served 12 years in the Arkansas area.

Wilke served as the ministry in local churches, including United Methodist Churches in Scandia, Kansas, Pleasant Valley in Wichita, Kansas, University United Methodist in Salina, Kansas, and the First United Methodist Church in Wichita, Kansas.

Wilke introduced Hillary Clinton when she addressed the 1996 General Conference of the United Methodist Church.

In 2005, Wilke was recognized by Yale Divinity School for Distinction in Ordained Ministry

Wilke died on April 20, 2025, at the age of 94.

== Publications ==
- Wilke, Richard B. (1974). Pastor and Marriage Group Counseling. Nashville, Tennessee: Abingdon Press. ISBN 9780687301294.
- Wilke, Richard B. (1977). Tell Me Again I'm Listening. Festival Books. ISBN 9780687412273.
- Wilke, Richard B. (1978). Our Father. Nashville, Tennessee: Abingdon Press. ISBN 9780687295449.
- Wilke, Richard B. (1986). And Are We Yet Alive? The Future of the United Methodist Church. Nashville, Tennessee: Abingdon Press. ISBN 9780687013821.
- Wilke, Richard B. (1989). Signs and Wonders: The Mighty Work of God in the Church. Nashville, Tennessee: Abingdon Press. ISBN 9780687384488.
- Wilke, Richard B. (2008). The Tie That Binds: Connecting With God, the Church, and the World. Nashville, Tennessee: Abingdon Press. ISBN 9780687652082.
- Wilke, Richard B. (2014). Disciple. Nashville, Tennessee: Abingdon Press. ISBN 9781426714245.
