= Ransom Henry Gile =

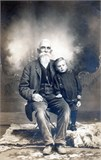
Ransom Henry Gile and one of his grandsons

Ransom Henry Gile (1836–1916) was an early settler in Scandia, Kansas.

Gile was born in Springfield, Massachusetts, on 3 June, 1836 and moved to Ohio with his parents at age four, although some records say he was born in Ohio on June 3, 1836. At age nineteen, he went to Iowa to work for the Ohio Stage Line Company.

In April 1862, Gile enlisted as a corporal in the Twenty-first Iowa Infantry and served until July 1864 when he re-enlisted and served in the First Iowa Battery. After being wounded in several Civil War battles, he was discharged in November 1865.

Gile returned to Iowa until 1873, when he moved to Kansas and took a homestead of eighty acres in Republic County. Gile worked the land, planting orchards and establishing a quarry for the area on his property.

Gile was married twice. His first wife Adaline Amelia Ingalls died less than a year after they were married in 1861. Four years later, he married Sarah Ann Mahaffey and they remained in Iowa until her death.

Gile died on March 7, 1916, in Scandia.
