= Mark S. Handcock =

Australian-American statistician

- Born: Bunbury, Western Australia
- Citizenship: Australia, United States of America
- Education: University of Western Australia; University of Chicago
- Known for: statistical methodology; statistical network modeling; network sampling; demography
- Awards: Fellow of the American Statistical Association (2009)
- Scientific career
- Fields: Statistics
- Workplaces: University of California, Los Angeles; University of Washington; Pennsylvania State University; New York University
- Doctoral advisor: Michael L. Stein at the Mathematics Genealogy Project
- Other academic advisors: Jeffrey S. Simonoff
- Website: handcock.github.io

Mark Stephen Handcock is an Australian-American statistician. He is Distinguished Professor of Statistics at the University of California, Los Angeles and the Dunn Family Endowed Chair in Data Theory. His research centers on statistical methodology, social network analysis, spatial statistics, demography, and survey sampling for hard-to-reach populations. He was elected a Fellow of the American Statistical Association in 2009.

== Methodological contributions ==
=== Relative distribution methods ===
Handcock pioneered relative distribution methods in collaboration with Martina Morris. This nonparametric statistical framework isolates changes in the shape of a distribution from shifts in location or scale, providing tools to evaluate socioeconomic polarization and income inequality.

=== Latent space models ===
In collaboration with Peter D. Hoff and Adrian E. Raftery, Handcock developed latent space models for social networks. By embedding network actors in an unobserved metric space, the approach captures intrinsic network dependencies such as transitivity and homophily, and has become widely used across statistical network modeling and machine learning.

=== Exponential-family random graph models (ERGMs) ===
Handcock has made foundational contributions to the statistical specification, degeneracy mitigation, and simulation-based inference of exponential-family random graph models (ERGMs). The framework provides probabilistic representations of network formation and dependency, and is standard across quantitative social sciences and political analysis.

=== Respondent-driven sampling and hidden population estimation ===
Handcock's methodological research in survey sampling focuses on hard-to-reach and hidden populations, particularly through respondent-driven sampling (RDS) and network sampling frameworks. His work addresses structural selection biases in peer-driven recruitment, including preferential recruitment and finite population sampling without replacement. This contributed to the development of successive sampling population size estimation (SS-PSE) models, used in bio-behavioral surveillance and global epidemiology to estimate the size of populations at risk for infectious diseases.

== Statistical software ==
Handcock is a founding developer of the statnet suite of packages in R, which provides an integrated computational environment for the statistical modeling, simulation, and analysis of network data. The project implements algorithms for ERGMs and latent space models and is featured in standard computational curricula. In 2019, the development team received the William D. Richards Software Award from the International Network for Social Network Analysis (INSNA) in recognition of the suite's contributions to publicly available software in social network analysis.

Beyond statnet, Handcock has authored and maintained software tools for field researchers, demographers, and epidemiologists:

- RDS Analyst and RDS: A software framework and graphicalinterface in R designed for estimating hidden population sizes and analyzing data collected via respondent-driven sampling.
- reldist: An R package providing functions for the comparison of distributions using relative distribution methods.
- sspse: Software implementing successive sampling population size estimation for respondent-driven sampling data.
- WHO Excess Mortality Calculator: An open-source web application and statistical modeling tool built to support the World Health Organization's COVID-19 pandemic response by estimating all-cause and excess mortality.
- Additional Packages: Handcock's implementations include ruf for spatial resource utilization estimation in ecology, degreenet for analyzing skewed count distributions in networks, and glmc for fitting generalized linear models subject to constraints.

== Selected books and critical reception ==
Handcock has co-authored several monographs and textbooks:

- A Casebook for a First Course in Statistics and Data Analysis (with Samprit Chatterjee and Jeffrey S. Simonoff; John Wiley & Sons, 1995). The book was reviewed in statistical education literature for its pedagogical approach of teaching data analysis through empirical case studies.
- Relative Distribution Methods in the Social Sciences (with Martina Morris; Springer, 1999). It established relative distribution techniques as a tool for evaluating shifts in distribution shape, receiving reviews highlighting its synthesis of mathematical statistics and empirical sociology.
- Divergent Paths: Economic Mobility in the New American Labor Market (with Annette Bernhardt, Martina Morris, and Marc A. Scott; Russell Sage Foundation, 2001). The work examines structural changes in career mobility and earnings inequality in the United States, receiving extensive critical review in sociology and economics journals..

== Awards and honors ==
- William D. Richards Software Award (2019): Conferred by the International Network for Social Network Analysis (INSNA) to the primary developers of statnet for lifetime contributions to publicly available software in social network analysis.
- INSNA Citation Award (2012): Awarded for the most cited paper in an INSNA publication over the preceding five years for "Recent developments in Exponential Random Graph ($p^*$) Models for Social Networks" published in Social Networks.
- Fellow of the American Statistical Association (elected 2009): Conferred for contributions to statistical methodology and applications.
- Cornell University Center for the Study of Inequality Distinguished Book Award (2003): For Divergent Paths: Economic Mobility in the New American Labor Market.
- Richard A. Lester Prize (2002): Conferred by the Industrial Relations Section at Princeton University for the outstanding book in labor economics and industrial relations (for Divergent Paths).
