= Kenneth L. Gile =

Kenneth Gile (born 1947) is the Chief Operating Officer of flydubai, the low-cost carrier owned by the Dubai government. Prior to joining flydubai, Ken was the President and COO of Skybus Airlines which ended in the spring of 2008 and a former pilot, Chief Pilot and Director of Operations for Southwest Airlines. Ken was also a pilot in the US Air Force, as well as for Saudia prior to his career with Southwest.

Gile is noted for his low-cost carrier (LCC) experience, specifically for his focus on Employees, aircraft utilization and electronic booking. His focus is fuel management through conservation and a successful hedging plan, something that has been a key component of Southwest Airline's strategy.
