= Gilé =

Card game

Gilé, Giley or Cuarenta y una ("Forty-one") is a point-trick card game of the Envite family which uses a Spanish pack and has the feature of discarding.

== Rules ==
Gilé is a four-hand game but five may also play.

A Spanish pack of 28 cards is used comprising the Ace, King, Knight, Jack, Seven, Three and Two of each suit. The ace is worth 11 points; king, knight, jack, three and two, 10 points; seven, 7 points.

The objective of the game is to score the maximum number of points possible with cards of the same suit.

=== Deal and vying ===
The dealer (card player), who will have been chosen by drawing lots, deals two cards to each player in an anticlockwise direction. After looking at the cards, a first round of bets is made. If all pass, the cards are shuffled and redealt, the first ones dealt being set aside.

Once the first vying round is over, two more cards are dealt to each player who is staying in the game and then there is a second round.

If after the second round there are two or more players left in play, the discard phase begins. Each player may discard any cards considered appropriate and then receives as the same number to complete a hand of four cards. At the end of the discard phase, the final round takes place.

All players left in play reveal their hands to determine the winner. The maximum score with four cards of the same suit (a giley) is 41 points; followed by 40 (four 10-point cards); then 38 (ace, two 10-pointers and the seven); and 37 (three 10 pointers and the seven). The rest of the hands combine cards with two or more different suits, with 31 points being the best hand (ace and two 10-point cards).

In the event of a tie on points, the dealer or the player immediately seated to his right hand wins. A variant of the game states that, for equal scores, the rank of the suits determines the winner; this being, from highest to lowest: Coins, Cups, Swords and Clubs. With this system the dealer loses all privileges. Before the game players must decide which variant they are playing.

== Bibliography ==
- Juegos de naipes españoles. Guía fácil y rápida. Vitoria: Naipes Heraclio Fournier. 1997. ISBN 84-85074-01-7.
- Arts, Niké (1999). Enciclopedia de los juegos de cartas. Barcelona: Victor. "Giley" pp. 37ff.
- Almudí, Carlos Mora (2015). Un Gran Hombre. Madrid: ET.
