= Gary/Chicago International Airport =

Airport in Gary, Indiana, United States

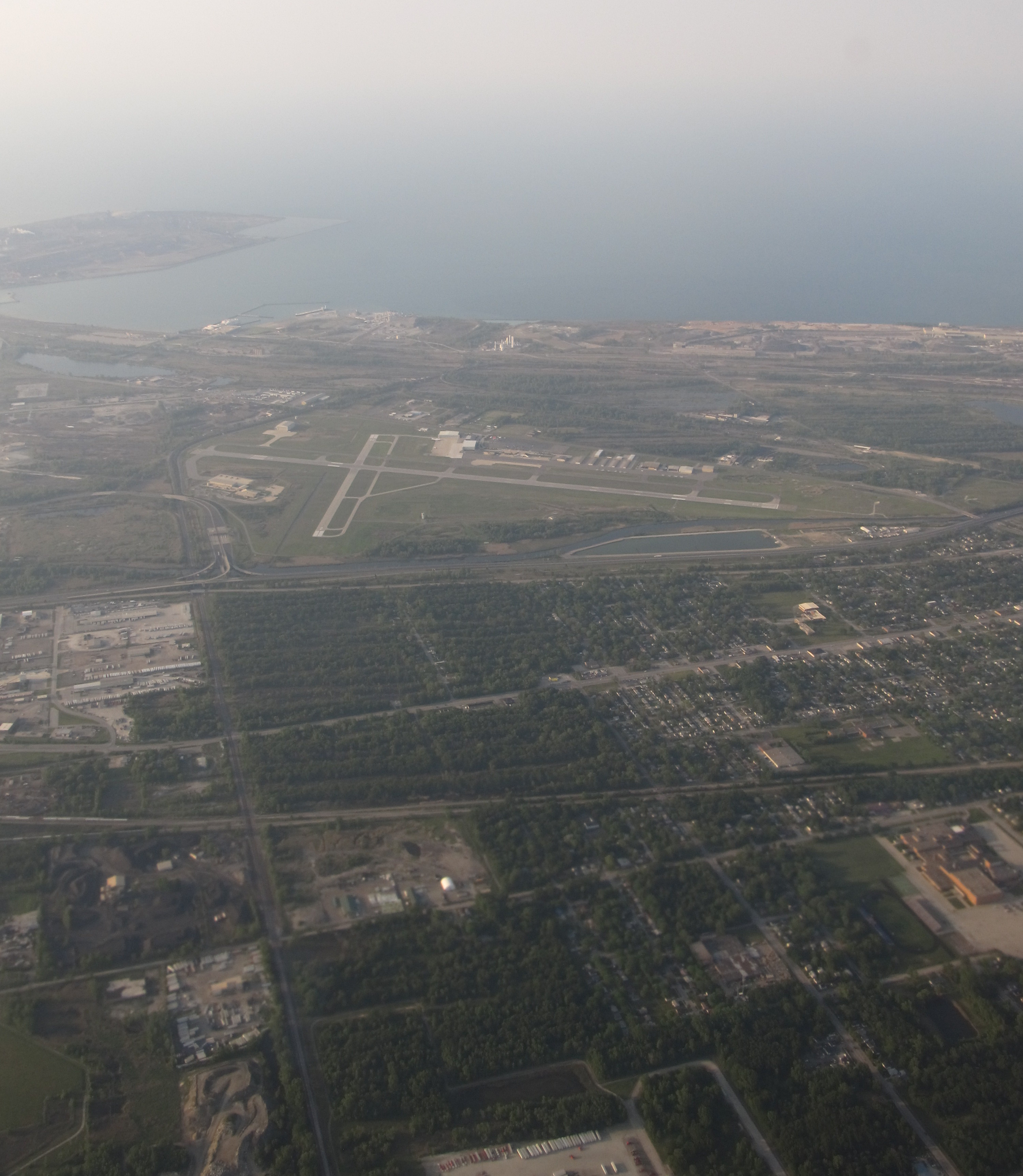
- IATA: GYY; ICAO: KGYY; FAA LID: GYY

Summary
- Airport type: Public
- Owner: Chicago/Gary Regional Airport Authority
- Operator: Gary/Chicago International Airport Authority
- Serves: Chicago metropolitan area; Northwest Indiana
- Location: Gary, Indiana, U.S.
- Opened: 1954; 72 years ago
- Elevation AMSL: 597 ft (182 m)
- Coordinates: 41°36′59″N 087°24′46″W
- Website: www.flygyy.com

Maps
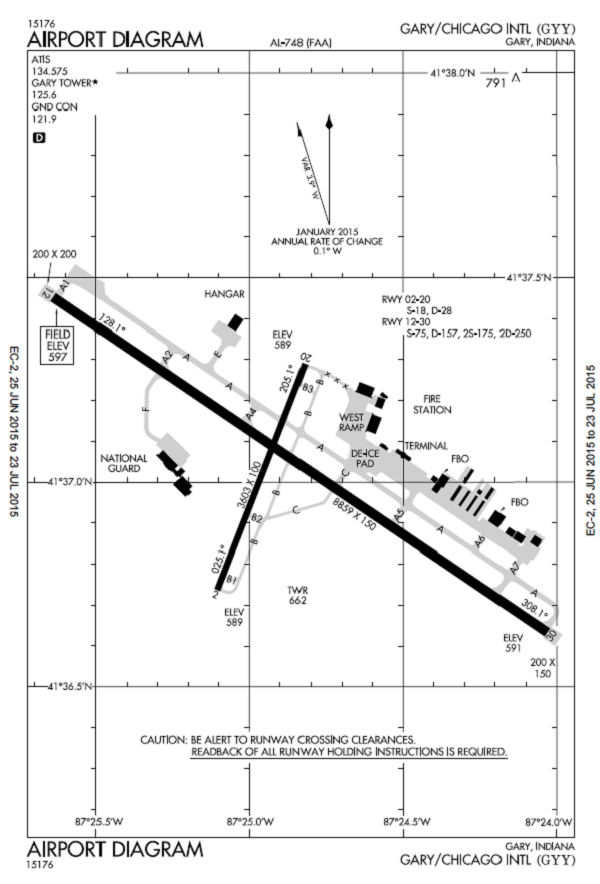
- FAA airport diagram
- Interactive map of Gary/Chicago International Airport

Runways
Direction	Length		Surface
Direction	ft	m	Surface
12/30	8,859	2,700	Concrete
02/20	3,604	1,098	Asphalt

Statistics
- Aircraft operations (2022): 22,054
- Based aircraft (2022): 114
- Source: Federal Aviation Administration

Gary/Chicago International Airport (IATA: GYY, ICAO: KGYY, FAA LID: GYY) is a joint civil-military public airport in Gary, in Lake County, Indiana, United States. It is three miles northwest of the city center of Gary, and 25 miles (40 km) southeast of the Chicago Loop. It is operated by the Gary/Chicago International Airport Authority, which was created by an interstate compact between Gary, Chicago, and Indiana. Nearby highway connections include I-90, I-80, I-94, I-65 and the Chicago Skyway.

Federal Aviation Administration records say the airport had 4,353 passenger boardings (enplanements) in calendar year 2008, 1,633 in 2009 and 2,143 in 2010. It is in the National Plan of Integrated Airport Systems for 2011–2015, which called it a non-primary commercial service airport based on enplanements in 2008 (between 2,500 and 10,000 per year) but would be categorized as general aviation based on enplanements in 2010.

== History ==
Gary/Chicago bills itself as the "third airport" for the Chicago metropolitan area, supplementing Chicago's major airports, O'Hare and Midway. Gary/Chicago Airport has been designed with an eye towards growth and the administration is courting airlines aggressively. Numerous businesses, including Boeing, Menards and White Lodging Services, base their corporate aircraft here. A National Guard installation has been built.

Federal funds were secured in January 2006 to move railroad tracks away from the northwest corner to allow extension of the main runway to 9,000 feet, as well as add gates to the existing passenger terminal building. The recent creation of the Northwest Indiana Regional Development Authority is expected to draw more state and local dollars for infrastructure improvements and additions.

Expanding Gary/Chicago Airport is an alternative to constructing a new airport near Peotone, Illinois, 30 miles south of Chicago. One advantage of expanding the Gary airport is its proximity to downtown Chicago. This plan is backed by the mayors of Gary and Chicago, while the Illinois state government is in favor of construction at Peotone. Tax revenues from a new airport at Peotone would go to the Illinois state government, while those from an expanded Gary airport would go to a regional airport authority and thus to the cities of Chicago and Gary.

A long-standing proposal to turn the Gary/Chicago International Airport into Chicago's third major airport received a boost in early 2006 with the approval of $48 million in federal funding over the next ten years. Expansion plans include a new multi-level Intermodal Terminal combining three modes of transit – passenger rail, passenger vehicles and air travel. The rail system is designed to combine both commuter and high-speed lines.

High tension power lines along the west end of the airport are buried. A definitive agreement has been reached with the railroads that will allow relocation of elevated tracks currently blocking the west end of runway 30. Completion of these projects was required to make way for a lengthening of the main runway.

On the afternoon of March 22, 2013, the FAA threatened to close the airport's control tower, along with other airports in Illinois as a part of Federal Budget sequestration in 2013. However, Allegiant Air planned to keep flying to Gary, resuming in May. The closure did not happen as planned.

The construction of the northwest extension of runway 12/30 from 7,003 to 8,859 feet was finally completed and opened for service on June 25, 2015.

== Facilities and aircraft ==
Gary/Chicago International Airport covers 763 acres (309 ha) at an elevation of 597 feet (180 m) above mean sea level. It has two asphalt runways: 12/30 is 8,859 by 150 feet (2,700 x 46 m) and 2/20 is 3,604 by 100 feet.

In the year ending December 31, 2022, there were 114 aircraft based at this airport: 39 single-engine, 9 multi-engine, 53 jet, 6 helicopter, and 7 military.

The airport is also home to an Army Aviation Support Facility supporting UH-60 Blackhawk helicopter operations of the Indiana Army National Guard as well as an additional collocated Army National Guard Armory supporting additional Indiana ARNG units and personnel. The installation is located on the site of a former Cold War-era Army Nike missile battery.

An ex-US Airways Boeing 737-400 is stored at the airport. It is owned by the Ivy Tech College and used for various types of training.

== Passenger service history ==
The airport was once served by Pan Am, Southeast Airlines, SkyValue Airlines, Skybus Airlines and Hooters Air, with flights to cities such as Hartford, Connecticut; St. Petersburg, Florida; Greensboro, North Carolina and Myrtle Beach, South Carolina. Prior to its bankruptcy in 2008, ATA Airlines planned turboprop service to several Indiana cities by its subsidiary, Chicago Express/ATA Connection, but the service was never started as Chicago Express Airlines was grounded in March 2005. Before ultimately choosing to serve Chicago O'Hare International Airport in 2006, JetBlue Airways considered flights to Gary/Chicago.

Gary/Chicago was the hub for seasonal carrier SkyValue Airlines from December 2006 to April 2007.

Skybus Airlines served the airport until the airline folded on April 4, 2008. Between then and 2011, there were no scheduled passenger flights out of the Gary/Chicago Airport, but charter airlines frequently flew casino guests to Atlantic City, Harrah's Tunica, and Beau Rivage Biloxi.

On December 12, 2011, Allegiant Air announced it would begin service to Orlando Sanford International Airport two days a week beginning February 15, 2012. Allegiant Air had considered Gary/Chicago International Airport before, but aircraft operational limits resulted in the airline deciding against Gary until the runway expansion was completed.

On May 24, 2013, Allegiant Air reported it was cancelling air service out of Gary because of low demand for the flights. Airport officials said that passenger loads were consistently more than Allegiant Air's minimums, but Allegiant Air said that the flights did not meet its revenue model. Allegiant Air's final scheduled flight from Gary was on August 10, 2013. Since Allegiant Air ended scheduled flights, there has been no scheduled commercial passenger airline service out of Gary Airport.

On May 13, 2020, UPS Airlines announced it was adding its express parcel services to Gary/Chicago International Airport using the Airbus A300 and Boeing 757 to and from Louisville International Airport, home to UPS WorldPort. Flights commenced on November 2, 2020.

On September 14, 2022, the airport authority hired the consulting firm Mead & Hunt to perform the necessary steps to re-attract passenger service. On July 18, 2023, the airport's executive director released plans for bringing back passenger service.

In November 2025, the airport authority contracted Gariup Construction to upgrade the passenger terminal in preparation for commercial flights. The upgrades include passenger boarding bridges and an automated terminal parking payment system. Construction is expected to take one year. In the meantime, airport officials are meeting with airlines to secure a commitment in 2026.

== Airlines and destinations ==
=== Cargo ===
Airlines	Destinations
Aeronaves TSM	Guadalajara, Laredo
AirNet Express	Cleveland, Columbia (MO)
UPS Airlines	Louisville

== Activity ==
Chicago-based Boeing selected the airport to permanently base its Midwest corporate jet fleet.

For many years airplanes seen in the Chicago Air & Water Show have flown from here, including the U.S. Air Force's C-5 Galaxy and the F-16 flight demonstration aircraft of the U.S. Air Force Thunderbirds. Since 1999, the Gary Air Show has based its operations here as well.

== Ground transportation ==
The South Shore Line commuter rail train serves the Gary/Chicago International Airport. The station, which is known as Gary/Chicago Airport, is located near Second Avenue, approximately one mile (1.6 km) south of the terminal. Service runs to downtown Chicago.

== See also ==
- List of airports in Indiana
