= Scandia, Kansas =

City in Republic County, Kansas

- City
- Location within Republic County and Kansas

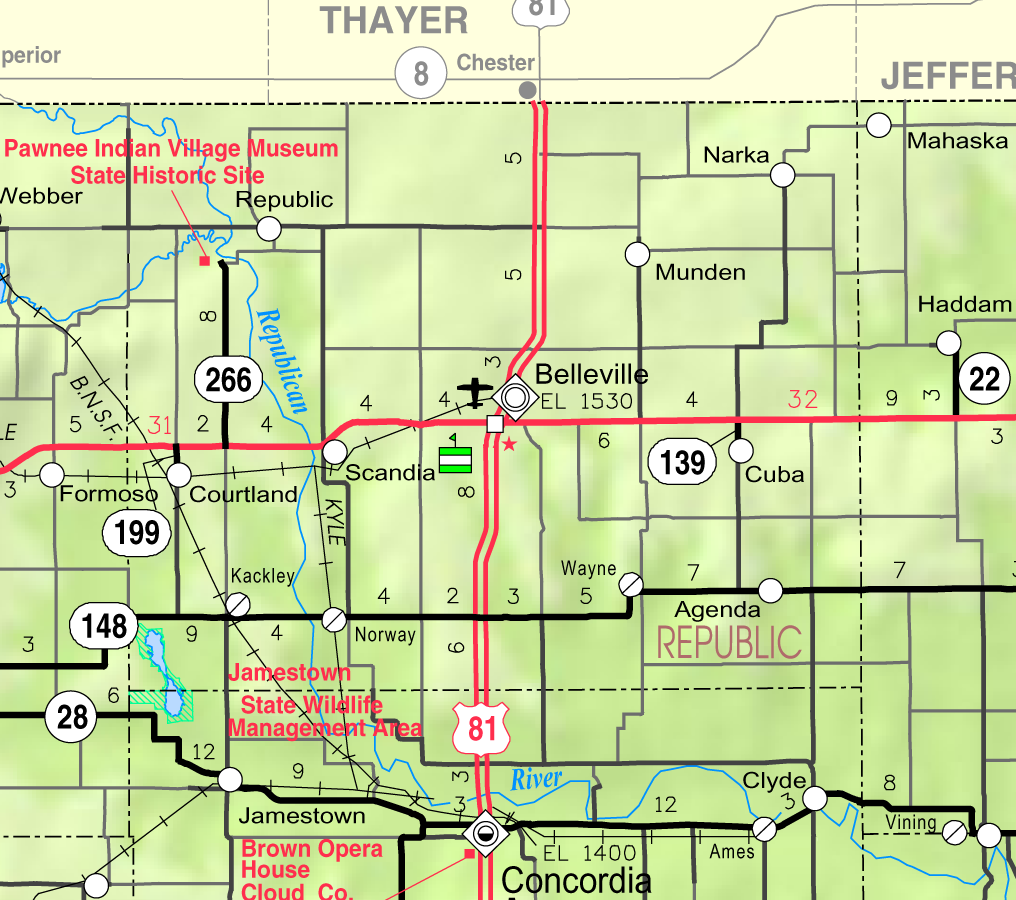
- KDOT map of Republic County (legend)
- Coordinates: 39°47′49″N 97°47′02″W
- Country: United States
- State: Kansas
- County: Republic
- Founded: 1868
- Incorporated: 1879
- Named for: Scandinavia

Area
  - Total: 0.47 sq mi (1.22 km^{2})
  - Land: 0.47 sq mi (1.22 km^{2})
  - Water: 0 sq mi (0.00 km^{2})
- Elevation: 1,447 ft (441 m)

Population (2020)
  - Total: 344
  - Density: 730/sq mi (282/km^{2})
- Time zone: UTC-6 (CST)
  - Summer (DST): UTC-5 (CDT)
- ZIP Code: 66966
- Area code: 785
- FIPS code: 20-63350
- GNIS ID: 2396549

Scandia is a city in Republic County, Kansas, United States. As of the 2020 census, the population of the city was 344.

== History ==
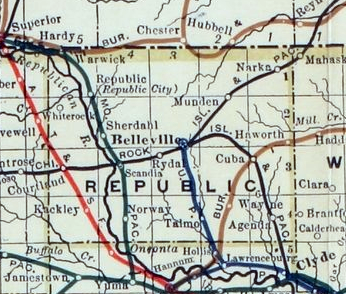
1915 railroad map of Republic County

The first American flag to be flown in what is now Kansas was raised in 1806 near the area of Scandia. The area was not settled until much later by Swedish immigrants and was first called New Scandinavia. The settlement of Scandia was promoted by crop failures during the 1860s in Sweden. In 1868, the Scandinavian Agricultural Society of Chicago purchased 12 sections of land along the Republican River and formed a colony. The name was changed to Scandia in 1876, according to post office records. Scandia was incorporated as a city in 1879. From there it became a transition point for trade and travel in the early 1900s. It is now a small rural community.

Scandia is the site of several historic houses dating to the early days of settlement. The three-story Wohlfort Mansion was built in the early 1890s by Thure Wohlfort (1835-1916) who was an early member of the society and one of the original founders of Scandia.

== Geography ==
According to the United States Census Bureau, the city has a total area of 0.48 square miles (1.24 km^{2}), all land.

== Demographics ==
Historical population
Census	Pop.	Note	%±
1880	573		—
1890	653		14.0%
1900	598		−8.4%
1910	579		−3.2%
1920	547		−5.5%
1930	608		11.2%
1940	614		1.0%
1950	611		−0.5%
1960	643		5.2%
1970	567		−11.8%
1980	480		−15.3%
1990	421		−12.3%
2000	436		3.6%
2010	372		−14.7%
2020	344		−7.5%
U.S. Decennial Census

=== 2010 census ===
As of the census of 2010, there were 372 people, 174 households, and 110 families residing in the city. The population density was 775.0 inhabitants per square mile (299.2/km^{2}). There were 225 housing units at an average density of 468.8 per square mile (181.0/km^{2}). The racial makeup of the city was 98.9% White, 0.5% Native American, and 0.5% from two or more races. Hispanic or Latino of any race were 1.6% of the population.

There were 174 households, of which 23.6% had children under the age of 18 living with them, 52.9% were married couples living together, 7.5% had a female householder with no husband present, 2.9% had a male householder with no wife present, and 36.8% were non-families. 33.3% of all households were made up of individuals, and 16.7% had someone living alone who was 65 years of age or older. The average household size was 2.14 and the average family size was 2.69.

The median age in the city was 48.2 years. 19.9% of residents were under the age of 18; 7.5% were between the ages of 18 and 24; 17.2% were from 25 to 44; 31.3% were from 45 to 64; and 24.2% were 65 years of age or older. The gender makeup of the city was 46.5% male and 53.5% female.

=== 2000 census ===
As of the census of 2000, there were 436 people, 192 households, and 123 families residing in the city. The population density was 926.7 inhabitants per square mile (357.8/km^{2}). There were 239 housing units at an average density of 508.0 per square mile (196.1/km^{2}). The racial makeup of the city was 99.31% White, and 0.69% Native American.

There were 192 households, out of which 30.2% had children under the age of 18 living with them, 57.8% were married couples living together, 4.7% had a female householder with no husband present, and 35.9% were non-families. 33.3% of all households were made up of individuals, and 20.8% had someone living alone who was 65 years of age or older. The average household size was 2.27 and the average family size was 2.91.

In the city, the population was spread out, with 26.8% under the age of 18, 6.0% from 18 to 24, 24.5% from 25 to 44, 22.7% from 45 to 64, and 20.0% who were 65 years of age or older. The median age was 42 years. For every 100 females, there were 91.2 males. For every 100 females age 18 and over, there were 89.9 males.

The median income for a household in the city was $29,896, and the median income for a family was $37,031. Males had a median income of $25,833 versus $14,688 for females. The per capita income for the city was $15,619. About 8.1% of families and 12.8% of the population were below the poverty line, including 11.9% of those under age 18 and 26.0% of those age 65 or over.

== Education ==
The community is served by Pike Valley USD 426 public school district. School unification consolidated Courtland and Scandia schools forming USD 426. The Pike Valley High School mascot is Panthers.

Prior to school unification, the Scandia High School mascot was Swedes. The Scandia Swedes won the Kansas State High School 8-Man football championship in 1970, 1971 and 1972.

== Notable people ==
See List of people from Republic County, Kansas

- Ransom Gile was an early settler in Scandia. He took a homestead of eighty acres in Republic County. Gile worked the land, planting orchards and establishing a quarry for the area on his property.
- Greta Granstedt was a movie actress. The Granstedt family was one of the five pioneer families from Sweden who settled in this north central Kansas community in 1867–68.
- Edwin Johnson was the 26th and 34th Governor of Colorado. He also served several terms in various other political offices.
- Richard Wilke was the writer of the Disciple ministry series. He was first a local pastor in Scandia and is the author of several other books and programs for the Christian community.
