= History of Kansas =

The U.S. state of Kansas, located on the eastern edge of the Great Plains. was the home of several nomadic Native Americans, including the Prairie Band Potawatomi Nation, Kickapoo Tribe, Sac and Fox Nation, Iowa Tribe, and more who migrated in and out of the area. In around 1450 AD, the Wichita people founded the city of Etzanoa, located near the present-day city of Arkansas City, Kansas. The city flourished between 1450 and 1700, potentially housing up to 20,000 people. Ealy Spanish explores visited the area in 1541, dubbing the city "The Great Settlement." The Spanish visited city at least three times, first by conquistador Francisco Vásquez de Coronado's expedition, the Umana and Leyba expedition in 1594, and by Juan de Oñate in 1601. Most of Kansas became part of the United States as a result of the Louisiana Purchase of 1803. When the area was opened to settlement after the Kansas–Nebraska Act of 1854, it became a flashpoint that contributed to the outbreak of the American Civil War. Settlers from North and South arrived in order to vote slavery down or up. The free staters prevailed over the proslavery immigrants.

After Kansas was admitted to the Union as a free state, it was home to frontier towns whose railheads were destinations for cattle drives from Texas. With the railroads came increased immigration from the East, from Germany as well as some freedmen called "Exodusters". Farmers first tried to replicate Eastern agricultural practices, but they failed because of insufficient rainfall. The solution, as James C. Malin showed, was to switch to soft spring wheat and later to hard winter wheat. The wheat was exported to Europe and was subject to wide variations in price. Many frustrated farmers joined the Populist movement around 1890. The Populist movement climaxed with the Legislative War of 1893 when both Populists and Republicans claimed control of the Kansas House of Representatives. Ultimately, conservative townspeople prevailed politically. They supported the progressive movement down to about 1940, but isolationism in foreign affairs combined with prosperity for the farmers and townsfolk made the state a center of conservative support for the Republican Party since 1940. Since 1945 the agricultural sector has declined and manufacturing has become more important.

== Prehistory ==
=== Paleo-Indians and Archaic peoples ===
Around 7000 BC, paleolithic descendants of Asian immigrants into North America reached Kansas. Once in Kansas, the indigenous ancestors never abandoned Kansas. They were later augmented by other indigenous peoples migrating from other parts of the continent. These bands of newcomers encountered mammoths, camels, ground sloths, and horses. The sophisticated big-game hunters did not keep a balance, resulting in the "Pleistocene overkill", the rapid and systematic destruction of nearly all the species of large ice-age mammals in North America by 8000 BC. The hunters who pursued the mammoths may have represented the first of north Great Plains cycles of boom and bust, relentlessly exploiting the resource until it has been depleted or destroyed.

After the disappearance of big-game hunters, some archaic groups survived by becoming generalists rather than specialists, foraging in seasonal movements across the plains. The groups did not abandon hunting altogether, but also consumed wild plant foods and small game. Their tools became more varied, with grinding and chopping implements becoming more common, a sign that seeds, fruits, and greens constituted a greater proportion of their diet. Also, pottery-making societies emerged.

=== Introduction of agriculture ===
For most of the Archaic period, people did not transform their natural environment in any fundamental way. The groups outside the region, particularly in Mesoamerica, introduced major innovations, such as maize cultivation. Other groups in North America independently developed maize cultivation as well. Some archaic groups transferred from food gatherers to food producers around 3,000 years ago. They also possessed many of the cultural features that accompany semi-sedentary agricultural life: storage facilities, more permanent dwellings, larger settlements, and cemeteries or burial grounds. El Cuartelejo was the northernmost Indian pueblo. This settlement is the only pueblo in Kansas from which archaeological evidence has been recovered.

Despite the early advent of farming, late Archaic groups still exercised little control over their natural environment. Wild food resources remained important components of their diet even after the invention of pottery and the development of irrigation. The introduction of agriculture never resulted in the complete abandonment of hunting and foraging, even in the largest of Archaic societies.

== Etzanoa ==
Etzanoa is an ancient city founded by the Wichita people in about 1450. Etzanoa was likely a major center in Quivira and located in present-day Arkansas City, Kansas, near the Arkansas River. In 1601, Juan de Oñate visited the city of Etzanoa. Oñate and the other explorers who accompanied him called the city "the Great Settlement". Etzanoa may have been home to about 20,000 people at the time Oñate and his expedition found and explored the city.

The people who lived in the city were described by Jusepe's and Oñate as Rayados, a sub-tribe of the Wichita. Rayados means "striped" in Spanish, and the name reflects the straight line tattoos that many inhabitants had on their faces and bodies. They spoke a Caddoan language and lived in dispersed grass houses. By 1594, Spanish accounts claimed more than 1,200 houses were present at the city, and more appeared upstream on multiple rivers.

The site was likely abandoned in the early 18th century. Although there is no known cause, it is thought that European diseases, warfare, and slavery among Native Americans reduced the population and forced the remaining Rayados to be absorbed into the Wichita tribe.

== Early European exploration and local tribes ==
Important dates in Kansas's history

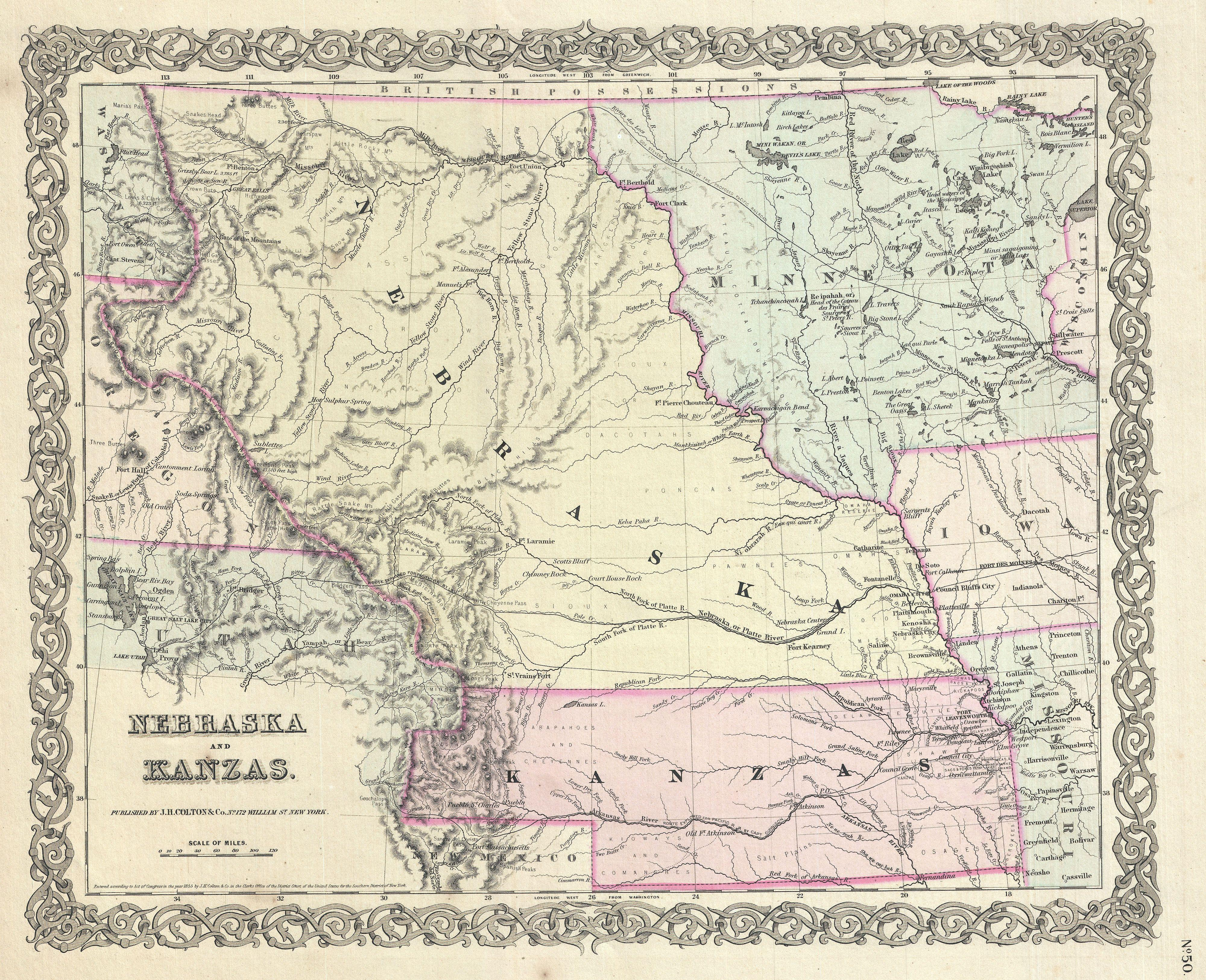
Map of Kansas (1855)

July–August 1541
Coronado explores Kansas
April 30, 1803
Louisiana Purchase Treaty signed
May 30, 1854
Kansas Territory organized
July 29, 1859
Constitution adopted by convention
January 29, 1861
Kansas becomes 34th state
August 21, 1863
Quantrill's Raid on Lawrence
Spring 1879
Exodusters
February 19, 1881
First state to Constitutionally prohibit alcohol
1890s
Populist Revolt
July 1951
Great Flood of 1951
May 17, 1954
Brown v. Board of Education of Topeka

More...

In 1541, Francisco Vázquez de Coronado, the Spanish conquistador, visited Kansas, allegedly turning back near "Coronado Heights" in present-day Lindsborg. Near the Great Bend of the Arkansas River, in a place he called Quivira, he met the ancestors of the Wichita people. Near the Smoky Hill River, he met the Harahey, who were probably the ancestors of the Pawnee. This was the first time that the Plains Indians had seen horses. Later, they acquired horses from the Spanish, and rapidly radically altered their lifestyle and range.

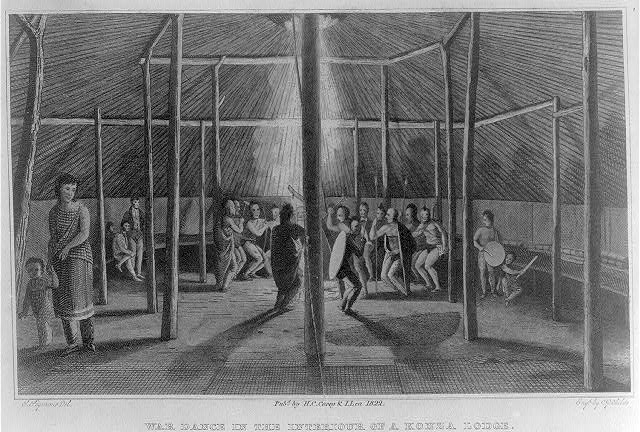
Samuel Seymour's 1819 illustration of a Kansa lodge and dance is the oldest drawing known to be done in Kansas.

Following this transformation, the Kansa (sometimes Kaw) and Osage Nation (originally Ouasash) arrived in Kansas in the 17th century. The Kansa claimed that they had occupied the territory since 1673. By the end of the 18th century, these two tribes were dominant in the eastern part of the future state: the Kansa on the Kansas River to the North and the Osage on the Arkansas River to the South. At the same time, the Pawnee (sometimes Paneassa) were dominant on the plains to the west and north of the Kansa and Osage nations, in regions home to massive herds of bison. Europeans visited the Northern Pawnee in 1719. In 1720, the Spanish military's Villasur expedition was wiped out by Pawnee and Otoe warriors near present-day Columbus, Nebraska, effectively ending Spanish expedition into the region. The French commander at Fort Orleans, Étienne de Bourgmont, visited the Kansas River in 1724 and established a trading post there, near the main Kansa village at the mouth of the river. Around the same time, the Otoe also inhabited various areas around the northeast corner of Kansas.

== Louisiana Purchase ==
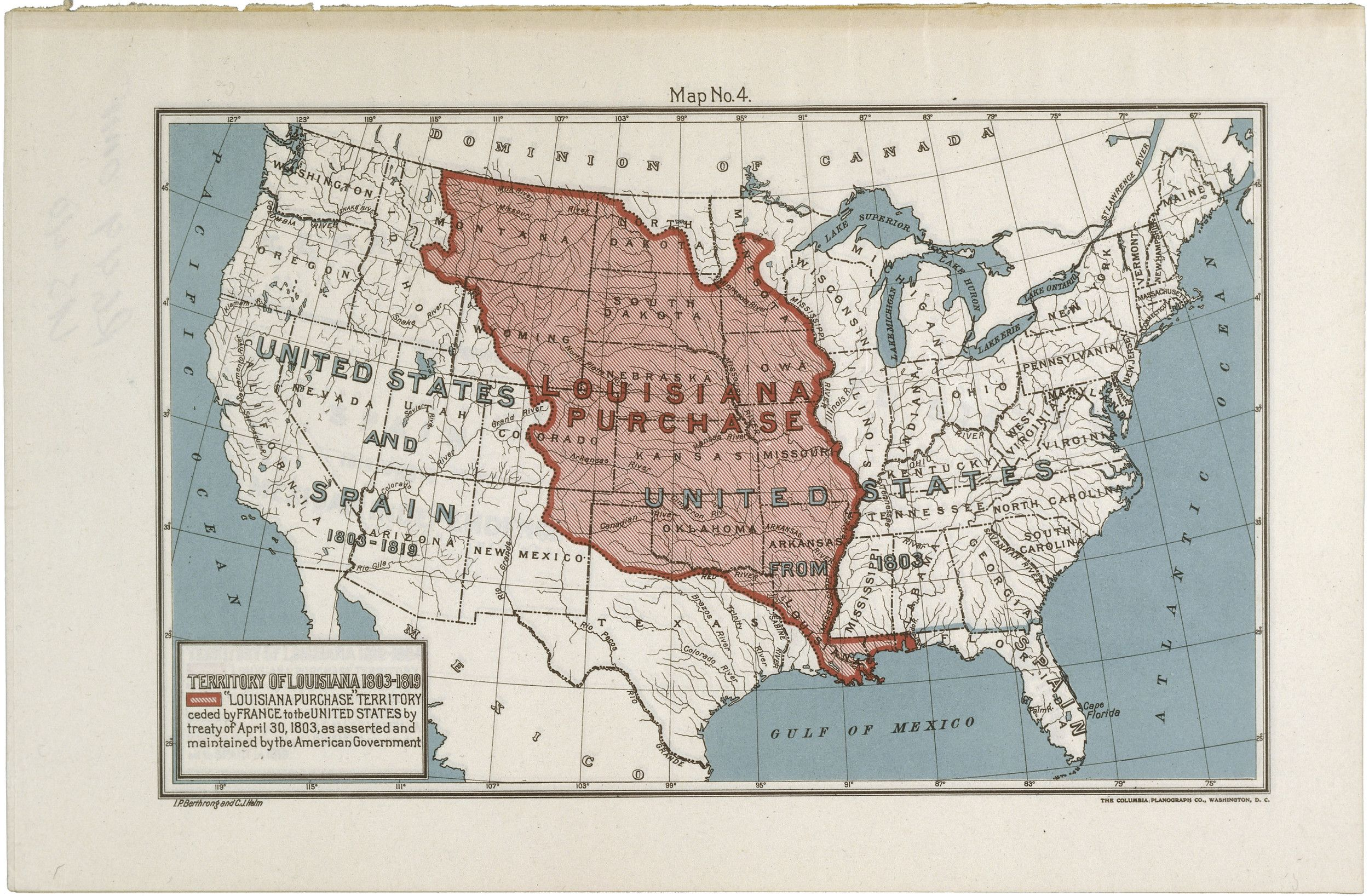
Frank Bond's illustration of the Louisiana Purchase

Apart from brief explorations, neither France nor Spain had any settlement or military or other activity in Kansas. In 1763, following the Seven Years' War in which Great Britain defeated France, Spain acquired the French claims west of the Mississippi River. It returned this territory to France in 1803, keeping title to about 7,500 square miles (19,000 km^{2}).

In the Louisiana Purchase of 1803, the United States (US) acquired all of the French claims west of the Mississippi River; the area of Kansas was unorganized territory. In 1819 the United States confirmed Spanish rights to the 7,500 square miles (19,000 km^{2}) as part of the Adams–Onís Treaty with Spain. That area became part of Mexico, which also ignored it. After the Mexican–American War and the US victory, the United States took over that part in 1848.

The Lewis and Clark Expedition left St. Louis on a mission to explore the Louisiana Purchase all the way to the Pacific Ocean. In 1804, Lewis and Clark camped for three days at the confluence of the Kansas and Missouri rivers in what is today Kansas City, Kansas (today commemorated at the Kaw Point Riverfront Park). They met French fur traders and mapped the area. In 1806, Zebulon Pike passed through Kansas and labeled it "the Great American Desert" on his maps. This view of Kansas would help form U.S. policy for the next 40 years, prompting the government to set it aside as land reserved for Native American resettlement.

From June 4, 1812, until August 10, 1821, the area that would become Kansas Territory 33 years later was part of the Missouri Territory. When Missouri was granted statehood in 1821 the area became unorganized territory and contained few if any permanent white settlers, except Fort Leavenworth. The Fort was established in 1827 by Henry Leavenworth with the 3rd U.S. Infantry from St. Louis, Missouri; it is the first permanent European settlement in Kansas. The fort was established as the westernmost outpost of the American military to protect trade along the Santa Fe Trail from Native Americans. The trade came from the East, by land using the Boone's Lick Road, or by water via the Missouri River. This area, called the Boonslick, was located due east in west-central Missouri and was settled by Upland Southerners from Virginia, Kentucky, and Tennessee as early as 1812. Its slave-owning population would contrast with settlers from New England who would eventually arrive in the 1850s.

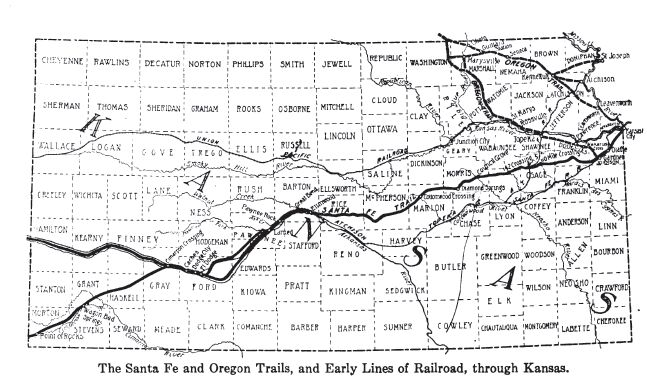

A section of the Santa Fe Trail through Kansas was used by emigrants on the Oregon Trail, which opened in 1841. The westward trails served as vital commercial and military highways until the railroad took over this role in the 1860s. To travelers en route to Utah, California, or Oregon, Kansas was an essential way stop and outfitting location. Wagon Bed Spring (also Lower Spring or Lower Cimarron Spring) was an important watering spot on the Cimarron Cutoff of the Santa Fe Trail. Other important locations along the trail were the Point of Rocks and Pawnee Rock.

=== 1820s–1840s: Indian territory ===
Beginning in the 1820s, the area that would become Kansas was set aside as Indian Territory by the U.S. government, and was closed to settlement by whites. The government resettled to Indian Territory (now part of Oklahoma) those Native American tribes based in eastern Kansas, principally the Kansa and Osage, opening land to move eastern tribes into the area. By treaty dated June 3, 1825, 20 million acres (81000 km^{2}) of land was ceded by the Kansa Nation to the United States, and the Kansa tribe was limited to a specific reservation in northeast Kansas. In the same month, the Osage Nation was limited to a reservation in southeast Kansas.

The Missouri Shawano (or Shawnee) were the first Native Americans removed to the territory. By treaty made at St. Louis on November 7, 1825, the United States agreed to provide:

"the Shawanoe tribe of Indians within the State of Missouri, for themselves, and for those of the same nation now residing in Ohio who may hereafter immigrate to the west of the Mississippi, a tract of land equal to fifty miles [80 km] square, situated west of the State of Missouri, and within the purchase lately made from the Osage."

The Delaware came to Kansas from Ohio and other eastern areas by the treaty of September 24, 1829. The treaty described:

"the country in the fork of the Kansas and Missouri Rivers, extending up the Kansas River to the Kansas (Indian's) line, and up the Missouri River to Camp Leavenworth, and thence by a line drawn westerly, leaving a space ten miles (16 km) wide, north of the Kansas boundary line, for an outlet."

Map of Indian territories, 1836

After this point, the Indian Removal Act of 1830 expedited the process. By treaty dated August 30, 1831, the Ottawa ceded land to the United States and moved to a small reservation on the Kansas River and its branches. The treaty was ratified April 6, 1832. On October 24, 1832, the U.S. government moved the Kickapoos to a reservation in Kansas. On October 29, 1832, the Piankeshaw and Wea agreed to occupy 250 sections of land, bounded on the north by the Shawanoe; east by the western boundary line of Missouri; and west by the Kaskaskia and Peoria peoples. By treaty made with the United States on September 21, 1833, the Otoe ceded their country south of the Little Nemaha River.

By September 17, 1836, the confederacy of the Sauk and Meskwaki, by treaty with the United States, moved north of Kickapoo. By treaty of February 11, 1837, the United States agreed to convey to the Pottawatomi an area on the Osage River, southwest of the Missouri River. The tract selected was in the southwest part of what is now Miami County.

In 1842, after a treaty between the United States and the Wyandots, the Wyandot moved to the junction of the Kansas and Missouri Rivers (on land that was shared with the Delaware until 1843). In an unusual provision, 35 Wyandot were given "floats" in the 1842 treaty – ownership of sections of land that could be located anywhere west of the Missouri River. In 1847, the Pottawatomi were moved again, to an area containing 576,000 acres (2,330 km^{2}), being the eastern part of the lands ceded to the United States by the Kansa tribe in 1846. This tract comprised a part of the present counties of Pottawatomie, Wabaunsee, Jackson and Shawnee.

== Early 1850s and the territory organization ==
Despite the treaties establishing Native American ownership of parts of Kansas, by 1850 European Americans were illegally squatting on their land and clamoring for the entire area to be opened for settlement. Presaging events that were soon to come, several U.S. Army forts, including Fort Riley, were soon established deep in Indian Territory to guard travelers on the various Western trails.

Although the Cheyenne and Arapaho tribes were still negotiating with the United States for land in western Kansas (the current state of Colorado) – they signed a treaty on September 17, 1851 – momentum was already building to settle the land.

=== Kansas–Nebraska Act ===
Congress began the process of creating Kansas Territory in 1852. That year, petitions were presented at the first session of the Thirty-second Congress for a territorial organization of the region lying west of Missouri and Iowa. No action was taken at that time. However, during the next session, on December 13, 1852, a Representative from Missouri submitted to the House a bill organizing the Territory of Platte: all the tract lying west of Iowa and Missouri, and extending west to the Rocky Mountains. The bill was referred to the United States House Committee on Territories, and passed by the full U.S. House of Representatives on February 10, 1853. However, Southern Senators stalled the progression of the bill in the Senate, while the implications of the bill on slavery and the Missouri Compromise were debated. Heated debate over the bill and other competing proposals would continue for a year, before eventually resulting in the Kansas–Nebraska Act, which became law on May 30, 1854, establishing the Nebraska Territory and Kansas Territory.

=== Native American territory ceded ===
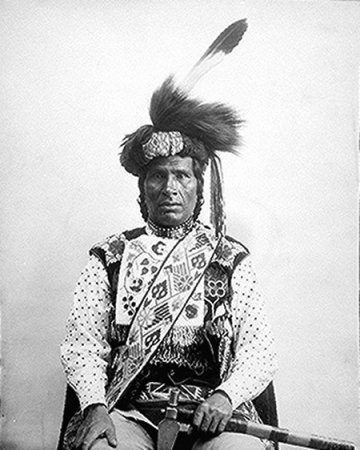
Chippewa named "One-Called-From-A-Distance"

Meanwhile, by the summer of 1853, it was clear that eastern Kansas would soon be opened to American settlers. The Commissioner of the Bureau of Indian Affairs negotiated new treaties that would assign new reservations with annual federal subsidies for the Indians. Nearly all the tribes in the eastern part of the Territory ceded the greater part of their lands prior to the passage of the Kansas territorial act in 1854, and were eventually moved south to the future state of Oklahoma.

In the three months immediately preceding the passage of the bill, treaties were quietly made at Washington with the Delaware, Otoe, Kickapoo, Kaskaskia, Shawnee, Sauk, Meskwaki and other tribes, whereby the greater part of eastern Kansas, lying within one or two hundred miles of the Missouri border, was suddenly opened to white settlement. (The Kansa reservation had already been reduced by treaty in 1846.) On March 15, 1854, Otoe and Missouri Indians ceded to the United States all their lands west of the Mississippi, except a small strip on the Big Blue River. On May 6 and May 10, 1854, the Shawnees ceded 6,100,000 acres (25,000 km^{2}), reserving only 200,000 acres (810 km^{2}) for homes. Also on May 6, 1854, the Delaware ceded all their lands to the United States, except a reservation defined in the treaty. On May 17, the Iowa similarly ceded their lands, retaining only a small reservation. On May 18, 1854, the Kickapoo too ceded their lands, except 150,000 acres (610 km^{2}) in the western part of the Territory. In 1854 lands were also ceded by the Kaskaskia, Peoria, Piankeshaw and Wea and by the Sauk and Meskwaki.

The final step in Americanizing the Indians was taking land from tribal control and assigning it to individual Indian households, to buy and sell as European Americans would. For example, in 1854, the Chippewa (Swan Creek and Black River bands) inhabited 8,320 acres (33.7 km^{2}) in Franklin County, but in 1859 the tract was transferred to individual Chippewa families.

== Kansas Territory ==
Upon the passage of the Kansas–Nebraska Act on May 30, 1854, the borders of Kansas Territory were set from the Missouri border to the summit of the Rocky Mountain range (now in central Colorado); the southern boundary was the 37th parallel north, the northern was the 40th parallel north. North of the 40th parallel was Nebraska Territory. When Congress set the southern border of the Kansas Territory as the 37th parallel, it was thought that the Osage southern border was also the 37th parallel. The Cherokees immediately complained, saying that it was not the true boundary and that the border of Kansas should be moved north to accommodate the actual border of the Cherokee land. This became known as the Cherokee Strip controversy.

=== An invitation to violence ===
The most controversial provision in the Kansas–Nebraska Act was the stipulation that settlers in Kansas Territory would vote on whether to allow slavery within its borders. This provision repealed the Missouri Compromise of 1820, which had prohibited slavery in any new states created north of latitude 36°30'. Predictably, violence resulted between the Northerners and Southerners who rushed to settle there in order to control the vote.

Within a few days after the passage of the Act, hundreds of pro-slavery Missourians crossed into the adjacent territory, selected an area of land, and then united with other Missourians in a meeting or meetings, intending to establish a pro-slavery preemption upon the entire region. As early as June 10, 1854, the Missourians held a meeting at Salt Creek Valley, a trading post three miles (4.8 km) west of Fort Leavenworth, at which a "Squatter's Claim Association" was organized. They said they were in favor of making Kansas a slave state, if it should require half the citizens of Missouri, musket in hand, to emigrate there, and even to sacrifice their lives in accomplishing this end.

To counter this action, the Massachusetts Emigrant Aid Company (and other smaller organizations) quickly arranged to send anti-slavery settlers (known as "Free-Staters") into Kansas in 1854 and 1855. The principal towns founded by the New Englanders were Topeka, Manhattan, and Lawrence. Several Free-State men also came to Kansas Territory from Ohio, Iowa, Illinois and other Midwestern states.

=== Bleeding Kansas ===
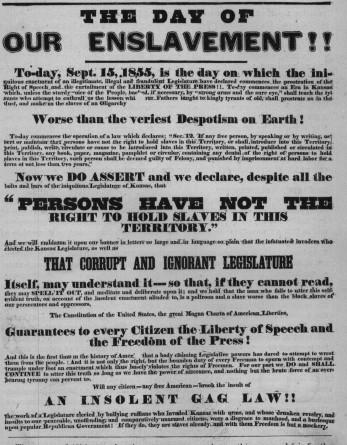
1855 Free-State poster

Despite the proximity and opposite aims of the settlers, the lid was largely kept on the violence until the election of the Kansas Territorial legislature on March 30, 1855. On that date, Missourians who had streamed across the border (known as "Border Ruffians") filled the ballot boxes in favor of pro-slavery candidates. As a result, pro-slavery candidates prevailed at every polling district except one (the future Riley County), and the first official legislature was overwhelmingly composed of pro-slavery delegates.

From 1855 to 1858, Kansas Territory experienced extensive violence and some open battles. This period, known as "Bleeding Kansas" or "the Border Wars", directly presaged the American Civil War. The major incidents of Bleeding Kansas include the Wakarusa War, the Sacking of Lawrence, the Pottawatomie massacre, the Battle of Black Jack, the Battle of Osawatomie, and the Marais des Cygnes massacre.

==== Wakarusa War ====
On December 1, 1855, a small army of Missourians, acting under the command of Douglas County, Kansas Sheriff Samuel J. Jones laid siege to the Free-State stronghold of Lawrence in what would later become known as "The Wakarusa War". A treaty of peace negotiation was announced amid much disorder and cries for the reading of the treaty shortly afterwards. It quelled the disorder and its provisions were generally accepted.

==== Sacking of Lawrence ====
On May 21, 1856, pro-slavery forces led by Sheriff Jones attacked Lawrence, burning the Free-State Hotel to the ground, destroying two printing presses, and robbing homes.

==== Pottawatomie massacre ====
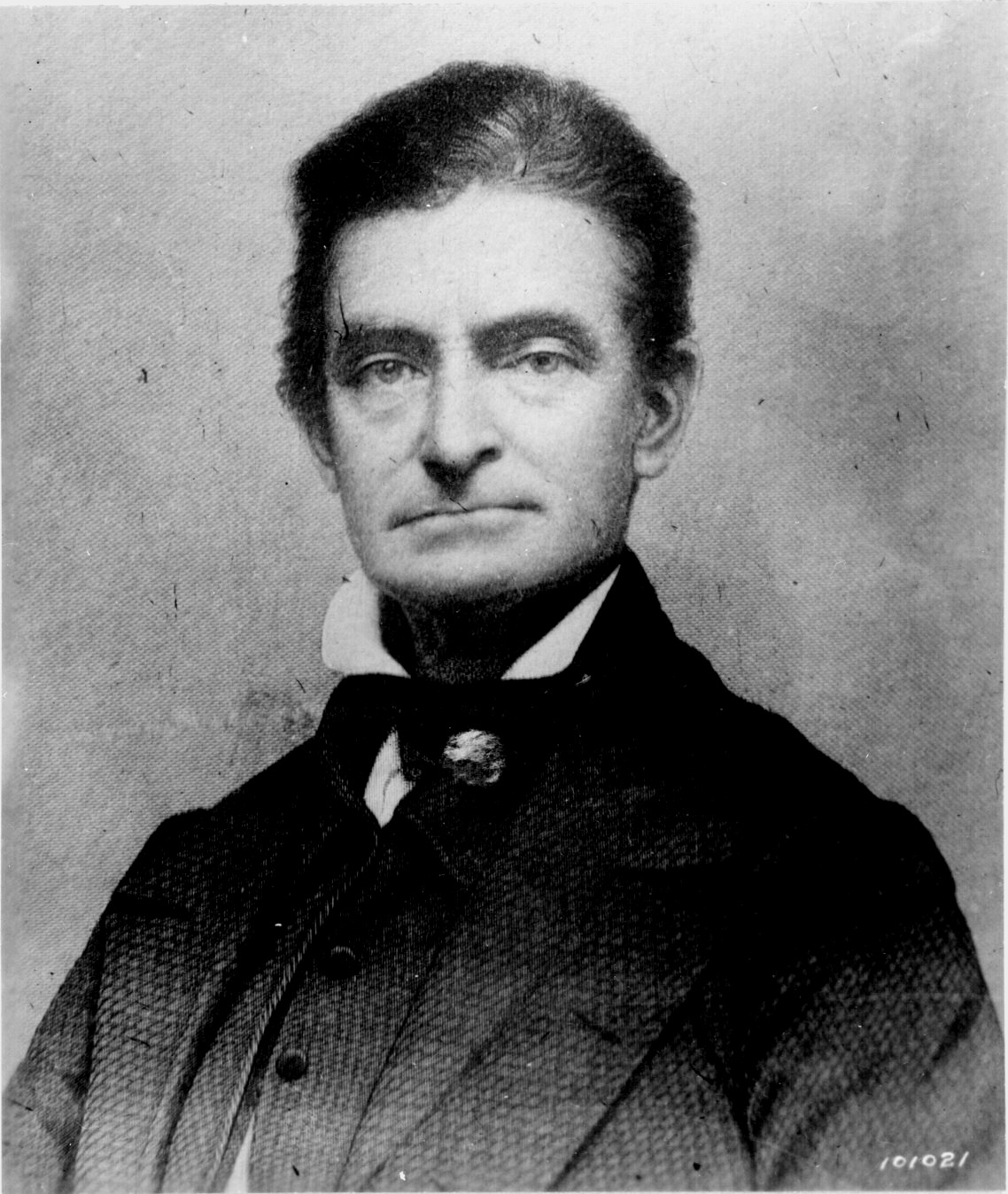
John Brown about 1856

The Pottawatomie massacre occurred during the night of May 24 to the morning of May 25, 1856. In what appears to be a reaction to the Sacking of Lawrence, John Brown and a band of abolitionists (some of them members of the Pottawatomie Rifles) killed five settlers, thought to be pro-slavery, north of Pottawatomie Creek in Franklin County, Kansas. Brown later said that he had not participated in the killings during the Pottawatomie massacre, but that he did approve of them. He went into hiding after the killings, and two of his sons, John Jr. and Jason, were arrested. During their confinement, they were allegedly mistreated, which left John Jr. mentally scarred. On June 2, Brown led a successful attack on a band of Missourians led by Captain Henry Pate in the Battle of Black Jack. Pate and his men had entered Kansas to capture Brown and others. That autumn, Brown went back into hiding and engaged in other guerrilla warfare activities.

=== Territorial constitutions ===
The violently feuding pro-slavery and anti-slavery factions tried to defeat the opposition by pushing through their own version of a state constitution, that would either endorse or condemn slavery. Congress had the final say.

==== Topeka Constitution ====
The Topeka Constitution was adopted on November 11, 1855, in Topeka by delegates elected from across the Kansas Territory. This Free State document was in response to the fraudulent takeover of the Territorial government by pro slavery forces seven months earlier. The Topeka Constitution's Bill of Rights proposed "There shall be no slavery in this state." It was ratified by the people of the Territory on December 15, 1855, and presented in Congress in March 1856. It passed in the U.S. House of Representatives but was prevented from a vote in the Senate by pro-slavery southern senators.

==== Lecompton Constitution ====
The Lecompton Constitution was adopted by a Convention convened by the official pro-slavery government on November 7, 1857. The constitution would have allowed slavery in Kansas as drafted, but the slavery provision was put to a vote. After a series of votes on the provision and the constitution were boycotted alternatively by pro-slavery settlers and Free-State settlers, the Lecompton Constitution was eventually presented to the U.S. Congress for approval. In the end, because it was never clear if the constitution represented the will of the people, it was rejected.

==== Leavenworth Constitution ====
While the Lecompton Constitution was being debated, a new Free-State legislature was elected and seated in Kansas Territory. The new legislature convened a new convention, which framed the Leavenworth Constitution. This constitution was the most radically progressive of the four proposed, outlawing slavery and providing a framework for women's rights. The constitution was adopted by the convention at Leavenworth on April 3, 1858, and by the people at an election held May 18, 1858 (all while the Lecompton Constitution was still under consideration).

President Buchanan sent the Lecompton Constitution to Congress for approval. The Senate approved the admission of Kansas as a state under the Lecompton Constitution, despite the opposition of Senator Douglas, who believed that the Kansas referendum on the Constitution, by failing to offer the alternative of prohibiting slavery, was unfair. The measure was subsequently blocked in the House of Representatives, where northern congressmen refused to admit Kansas as a slave state. Senator James Hammond of South Carolina characterized this resolution as the expulsion of the state, asking, "If Kansas is driven out of the Union for being a slave state, can any Southern state remain within it with honor?"

==== Wyandotte Constitution ====
Following the failure of the Lecompton and Leavenworth charters, a fourth constitution was drafted; the Wyandotte Constitution was adopted by the convention which framed it on July 29, 1859. It was adopted by the people at an election held October 4, 1859. It outlawed slavery but was far less progressive than the Leavenworth Constitution. Kansas was admitted into the Union as a free state under this constitution on January 29, 1861.

=== End of hostilities ===
By the time the Wyandotte Constitution was adopted in October 1859, it was clear that the pro-slavery forces had lost control of Kansas. With this dawning realization and the departure of John Brown from the state, Bleeding Kansas violence virtually ended. The new issue was John Brown's raid on Harpers Ferry, a national event, later that month.

== Statehood ==
The Great Seal of the State of Kansas was established by the legislature on May 25, 1861. The design was submitted by Senator John James Ingalls. He also proposed the state motto, "Ad astra per aspera", which means "to the stars through difficulty".

Kansas became the 34th state admitted to the Union on January 29, 1861.

The 1860s saw several important developments in the history of Kansas, including participation in the Civil War, the beginning of the cattle drives, the roots of Prohibition in Kansas (which would fully take hold in the 1880s), and the start of the Indian Wars on the western plains. James Lane was elected to the Senate from the state of Kansas in 1861, and reelected in 1865.

=== Civil War ===
After years of small-scale civil war, Kansas was admitted into the Union as a free state under the "Wyandotte Constitution" on January 29, 1861. Most people gave strong support for the Union cause. However, guerrilla warfare and raids from pro-slavery forces, many spilling over from Missouri, occurred during the Civil War.

At the start of the war in April 1861, the Kansas government had no well-organized militia, no arms, accoutrements or supplies, nothing with which to meet the demands, except the united will of officials and citizens. During the years 1859 to 1860, the military organizations had fallen into disuse or been entirely broken up. The first Kansas regiment was called on June 3, 1861, and the seventeenth, the last raised during the Civil War, July 28, 1864. The entire quota assigned to the Kansas was 16,654, and the number raised was 20,097, leaving a surplus of 3,443 to the credit of Kansas. Statistics indicated that losses of Kansas regiments in killed in battle and from disease are greater per thousand than those of any other State.

Apart from small formal battles, there were 29 Confederate raids into Kansas during the war. The most serious episode came when Lawrence, Kansas came under attack on August 21, 1863, by guerrillas led by William Clarke Quantrill. It was in part retaliation for "Jayhawker" raids against pro-Confederate settlements in Missouri.

==== Lawrence Massacre ====
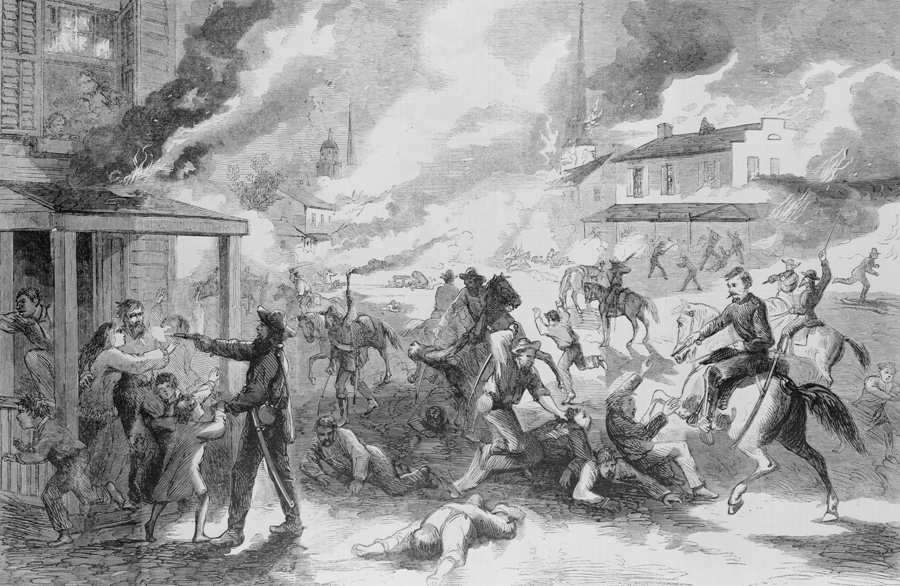
Quantrill's 1863 raid burned the town of Lawrence and killed 164 townspeople.

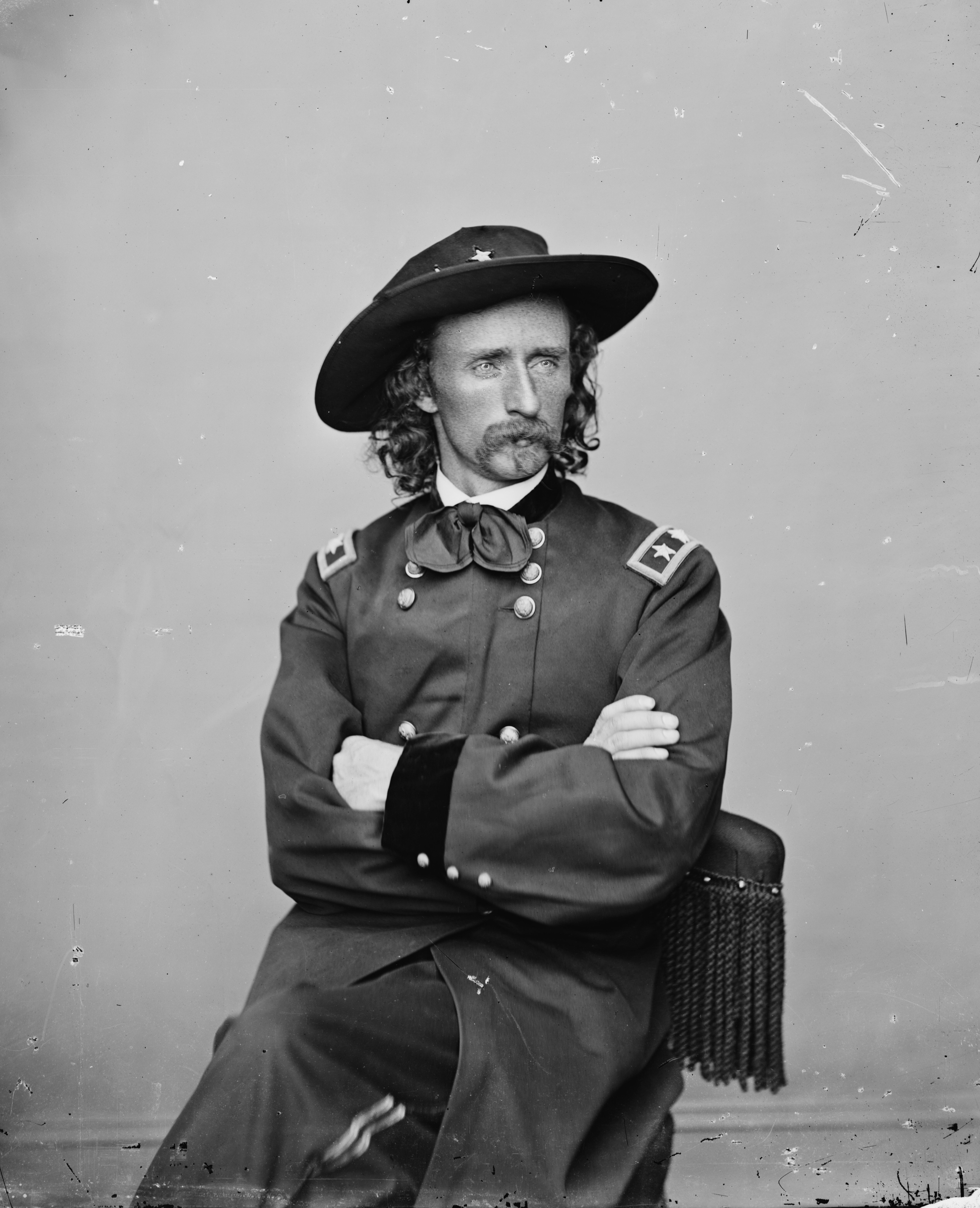
George Armstrong Custer led U.S. troops against Native Americans in western Kansas.

After Union Brigadier General Thomas Ewing Jr. ordered the imprisonment of women who had provided aid to Confederate guerrillas, tragically the jail's roof collapsed, killing five. These deaths enraged guerrillas in Missouri. On August 21, 1863, William Quantrill led Quantrill's Raid into Lawrence, burned much of the city and killed over 150 unarmed men and boys. In addition to the jail collapse, Quantrill also rationalized the attack on this citadel of abolition would bring revenge for any wrongs, real or imagined that the Southerners had suffered at the hands of Jayhawkers.

==== Baxter Springs ====
The Battle of Baxter Springs, sometimes called the Baxter Springs Massacre, was a minor battle in the War, fought on October 6, 1863, near the modern-day town of Baxter Springs, Kansas. The Battle of Mine Creek, also known as the Battle of the Osage, was a cavalry battle that occurred in Kansas during the war.

==== Marais des Cygnes ====
On October 25, 1864, the Battle of Marais des Cygnes occurred in Linn County, Kansas. This Battle of Trading Post was between Major General Sterling Price and Union forces under Major General Alfred Pleasonton. Price, after fleeing south after a defeat at Kansas City, was pushed out by Union forces.

=== Indian Wars in Kansas ===
Fort Larned (central Kansas) was established in 1859 as a base of military operations against hostile Indians of the Central Plains, to protect traffic along the Santa Fe Trail and after 1861 became an agency for the administration of the Central Plains Indians by the Bureau of Indian Affairs under the terms of the Fort Wise Treaty of 1861.

=== Kansas Pacific railroad ===
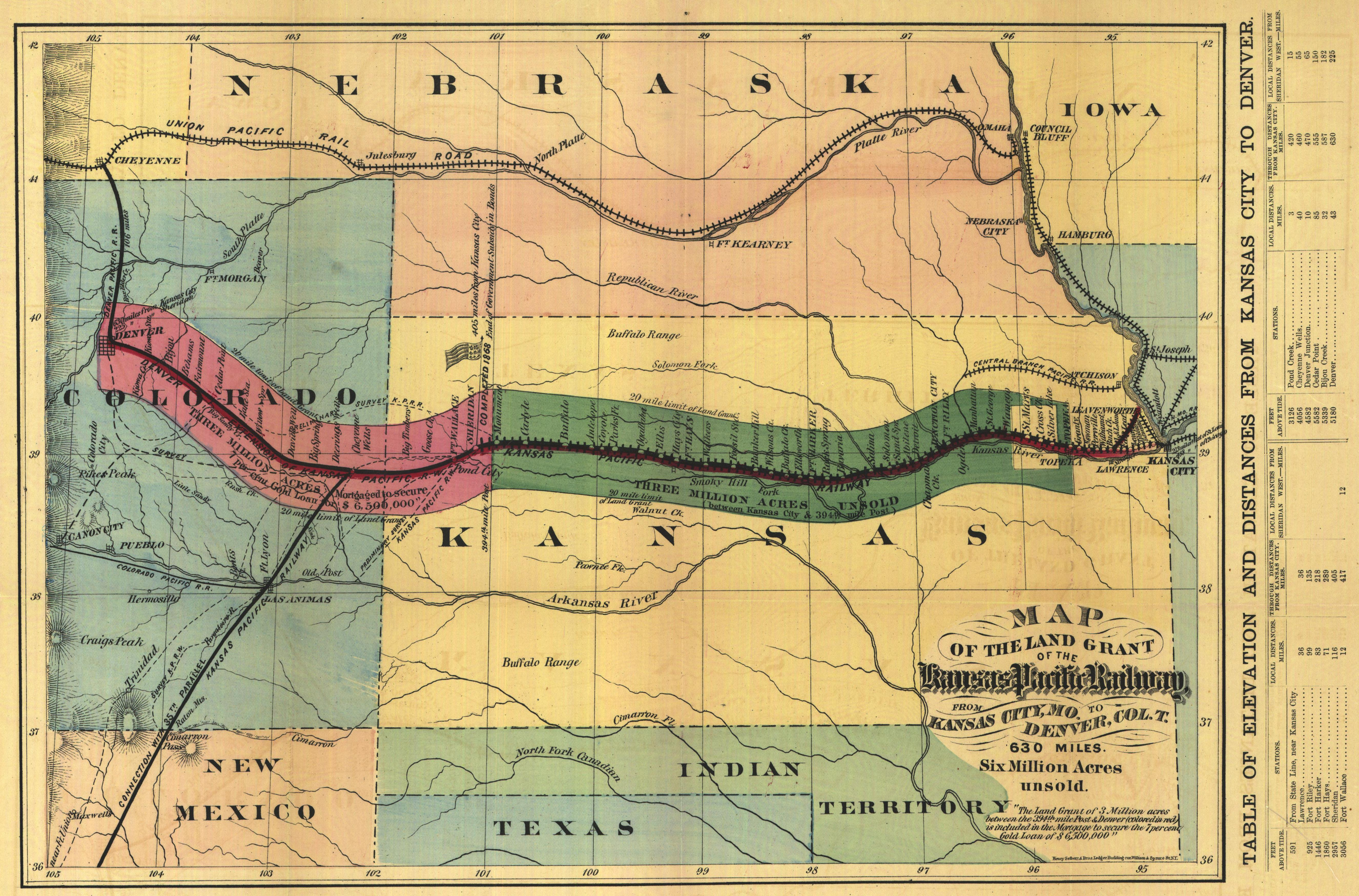
The Kansas Pacific main line shown on an 1869 map

In 1863, the Union Pacific Eastern Division (renamed the Kansas Pacific in 1869) was authorized by the United States Congress's Pacific Railway Act to create the southerly branch of the transcontinental railroad alongside the Union Pacific. Pacific Railway Act also authorized large land grants to the railroad along its mainline. The company began construction on its main line westward from Kansas City in September 1863.

Date	Major junctions
1863	Kansas City
1864	Lawrence
1866	Junction City
1867	Salina
1870	Denver

In the postwar era, many railroads were planned, but not all were actually built. The nationwide Panic of 1873 dried up funding. Land speculators and local boosters identified many potential towns, and those reached by the railroad had a chance, while the others became ghost towns. In Kansas, nearly 5000 towns were mapped out, but by 1970 only 617 were actually operating. In the mid-20th century, closeness to an interstate exchange determined whether town would flourish or struggle for business.

=== Cattle towns and Wild West ===
After the Civil War, the railroads did not reach the main cattle-ranching areas in Texas, so cowboys brought cattle to Kansas rail heads. Initially this was via the Santa Fe Trail. 1867, Joseph G. McCoy built stockyards in Abilene, Kansas and helped develop the Chisholm Trail, encouraging Texas cattlemen to undertake cattle drives to his stockyards from 1867 to 1887. The stockyards became the largest west of Kansas City. Once the cattle had been driven north, they were shipped eastward from the railhead of the Kansas Pacific Railway.

Kansas in the 1870s was home to many storied Wild West figures. In 1871, Wild Bill Hickok became marshal of Abilene, Kansas. His encounter there with John Wesley Hardin resulted in the latter fleeing the town after Wild Bill managed to disarm him. Hickok was later a deputy marshal at Fort Riley and a marshal at Hays. Dodge City was home to both Bat Masterson and Wyatt Earp, who worked as lawmen in the town. The Dalton Gang robbed trains and banks throughout Kansas and the Southwest and maintained a hideout in Meade. Coronado was involved in one of the bloodiest county seat fights in the history of the American West. The shoot-out on February 27, 1887, with boosters – some would say hired gunmen – from nearby Leoti left several people dead and wounded.

The Big Well at Greensburg, Kansas was built in the 1880s to provide water for the Santa Fe and Rock Island railroads. At 109 feet (33 m) deep and 32 feet (9.8 m) in diameter it is the world's largest hand-dug well.

=== Exodusters ===
In 1879, after the end of Reconstruction in the South, thousands of Freedmen moved from Southern states to Kansas. Known as the Exodusters, they were lured by the prospect of good, cheap land and better treatment. The all-black town of Nicodemus, Kansas, which was founded in 1877, was an organized settlement that predates the Exodusters but is often associated with them.

=== Prohibition ===
On February 19, 1881, Kansas became the first state to amend its constitution to prohibit all alcoholic beverages. This action was spawned by the temperance movement, and was enforced by the ax-toting Carrie A. Nation beginning in 1888. After 1890 prohibition was joined with progressivism to create a reform movement that elected four successive governors between 1905 and 1919; they favored extreme prohibition enforcement policies, and claimed Kansas was truly dry. Kansas did not repeal prohibition until 1948, and even then it continued to prohibit public bars, a restriction which was not lifted until 1987. Kansas did not allow retail liquor sales on Sundays until 2005, and most localities still prohibit Sunday liquor sales. By the Alcohol laws of Kansas today 29 counties are dry counties.

=== Religion ===
The city of Topeka played a notable role in the history of American Christianity around the beginning of the 20th century. Charles Sheldon, a leader in the Social Gospel movement who first used the phrase What would Jesus do?, preached in Topeka. Topeka was also the home to the church of Charles Fox Parham, whom many historians associate with the beginning of the modern Pentecostalism movement.

== Farming ==
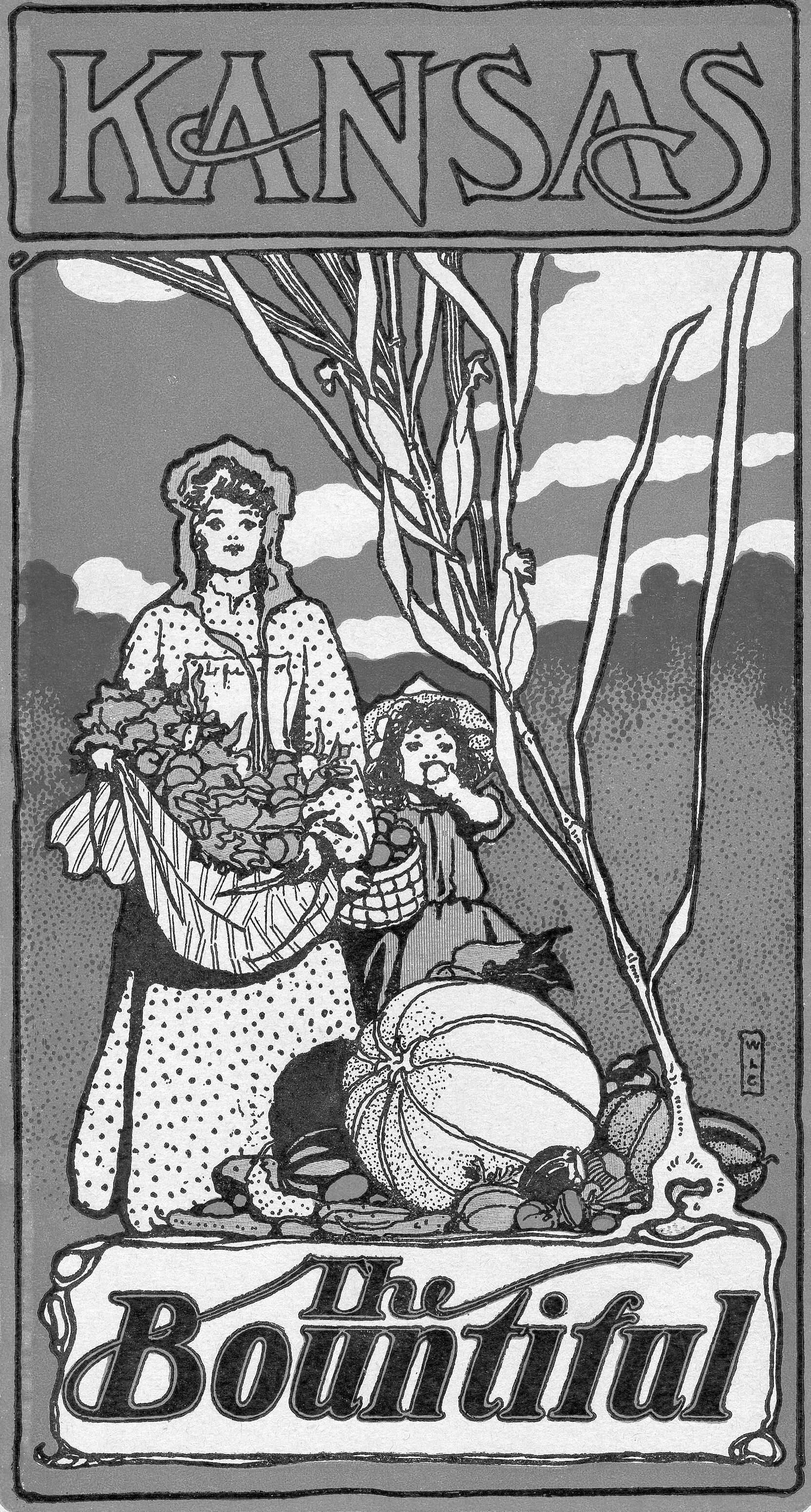
Boosterism: cover of a promotional booklet published in 1907 by the Rock Island railroad

=== Environment ===
Early settlers discovered that Kansas was not the "Great American Desert", but they also found that the very harsh climate—with tornadoes, blizzards, drought, hail, floods and grasshoppers—made for the high risk of a ruined crop. Many early settlers were financially ruined, and especially in the early 1890s, either protested through the Populist movement or went back east. In the 20th century, crop insurance, new conservation techniques, and large-scale federal aid have lowered the risk. Immigrants, especially Germans and their children, comprised the largest element of settlers after 1860; they were attracted by the good soil, low priced lands from the railroad companies, and (if they were American citizens) the chance to homestead 160 acres (0.65 km^{2}) and receive title to the land at no cost from the federal government.

The problem of blowing dust came not because farmers grew too much wheat, but because the rainfall was too little to grow enough wheat to keep the topsoil from blowing away. In the 1930s techniques and technologies of soil conservation, most of which had been available but ignored before the Dust Bowl conditions began, were promoted by the Soil Conservation Service (SCS) of the US Department of Agriculture, so that, with cooperation from the weather, soil condition was much improved by 1940.

=== Farm life ===
On the Great Plains very few single men attempted to operate a farm or ranch; farmers clearly understood the need for a hard-working wife, and numerous children, to handle the many chores, including child-rearing, feeding and clothing the family, managing the housework, feeding the hired hands, and, especially after the 1930s, handling the paperwork and financial details. During the early years of settlement in the late 19th century, farm women played an integral role in assuring family survival by working outdoors. After a generation or so, women increasingly left the fields, thus redefining their roles within the family. New conveniences such as sewing and washing machines encouraged women to turn to domestic roles. The scientific housekeeping movement was promoted across the land by the media and government extension agents, as well as county fairs which featured achievements in home cookery and canning, advice columns for women in the farm papers, and home economics courses in the schools.

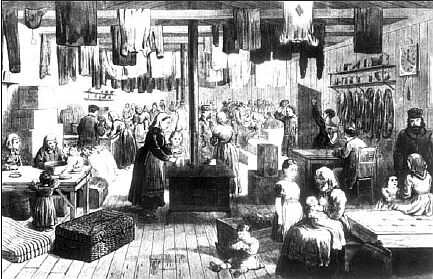
Temporary quarters for Volga Germans in central Kansas, 1875

Although the eastern image of farm life on the prairies emphasizes the isolation of the lonely farmer and farm life, in reality rural folk created a rich social life for themselves. They often sponsored activities that combined work, food, and entertainment such as barn raisings, corn huskings, quilting bees, Grange meeting, church activities, and school functions. The womenfolk organized shared meals and potluck events, as well as extended visits between families.

=== Manufacturing farm equipment ===
In 1947, Lyle Yost founded Hesston Manufacturing Company. It specialized in farm equipment, including self-propelled windrowers and the StakHand hay harvester. In 1974, Hesston Company commissioned its first belt buckles, which became popular on the rodeo circuit and with collectors. In 1991, the American-based equipment manufacturer AGCO Corporation purchased Hesston Corporation and farm equipment is still manufactured in the city.

=== 1890s ===
In 1896 William Allen White, editor of the Emporia Gazette attracted national attention with a scathing attack on William Jennings Bryan, the Democrats, and the Populists titled "What's the Matter With Kansas?" White sharply ridiculed Populist leaders for letting Kansas slip into economic stagnation and not keeping up economically with neighboring states because their anti-business policies frightened away economic capital from the state. The Republicans sent out hundreds of thousands of copies of the editorial in support of William McKinley during the 1896 United States presidential election. While McKinley carried the small towns and cities of the state, Bryan swept the wheat farms and won the electoral vote, even as McKinley won the national vote.

== 20th century ==
=== Progressive era ===
Kansas was a center of the progressive movement, with enthusiastic support from the middle classes. Much of the leadership was provided by Republican newspaper editors, such as William Allen White of the Emporia Gazette, Joseph L. Bristow of Salina, and Edward Hoch, of the Marion Record. Religion and gender played a role. Methodists and crusaders from the Woman's Christian Temperance Union (WCTU) demanded the end of the liquor business. WCTU activists also became supporters of woman suffrage. White called for a direct primary because Republicans attended the Democratic caucus in order to nominate the weakest candidate; Democrats did the same and thus the weakest men get nominated and elected. A direct primary would let the Republicans voters select the best candidate for their party and likewise the Democrats. White never ran for office but Bristow was elected senator in 1908 and Hoch governor in 1904 and 1906. Hoch denounced the conservative wing of his party:

it grows out of unwise leadership; of unfair standards of republicanism; of factional intolerance; of the multiplicity of useless offices; of extravagance in public expenditures; of enormous increase in burdens of taxation.

According to Craig Miner, the main issues of progressive era Kansas (in chronological order), were the flood of 1903, conservation, the battle to control Standard Oil in 1905, regulation of railroads and trusts, capital punishment, women's rights, public health, urban reform, the Progressive Party campaign of 1912, and isolationism in foreign policy. In addition there was a long debate on the state purchase of school textbooks. The state wrote, printed and sold its school books until 1937. Supervision was lax and the textbooks were poorly done—filled with typos, grammatical errors, garbled passages and poor artwork. However, the state did save some money.

According to Gene Clanton, Populism and progressivism in Kansas had similarities but different bases of support. Both opposed corruption and trusts. Populism emerged earlier and came out of the farm community. It was radically egalitarian in favor of the disadvantaged classes; it was weak in the towns and cities except in labor unions. Progressivism, on the other hand, was a later movement. It emerged after the 1890s from the urban business and professional communities. Most of its activists had opposed populism. It was elitist, and emphasized education and expertise. Its goals were to enhance efficiency, reduce waste, and enlarge the opportunities for upward social mobility. However, some former Populists changed their emphasis after 1900 and supported progressive reforms.

The new city manager system was designed by progressives to increase efficiency and reduce partisanship and avoid the bribery of elected local officials. It was promoted in the press, led by Henry J. Allen of the Wichita Beacon, and pushed through by Governor Arthur Capper. By the 1980s 52 Kansas cities used the system.

=== 1910s ===
In 1915, the El Dorado Oil Field, around the city of El Dorado, was the first oil field that was found using science/geologic mapping, and part of the Mid-Continent oil province. By 1918, the El Dorado Oil Field was the largest single field producer in the US, and was responsible for 12.8% of national oil production and 9% of the world production. It was deemed by some as "the oil field that won World War I".

In World War I, 80,000 Kansans enlisted in the military after April, 1917 when the United States declared war on Germany. They were attached mostly to the 35th, the 42nd, the 89th, and the 92nd infantry divisions. The state's large German element had favored neutrality and were under close watch. Often they were forced to buy war bonds or stop speaking German in public. German churches largely switched to English at this time. The intense nationalism of the war years undermined progressivism and led to conservative business dominance in the 1920s. However, the efficiency dimension persisted.

=== 1920s ===
While urban Kansas prospered in the 1920s, the farm economy had overexpanded when wheat prices were high during the war, and had to cut back sharply. Many farmers took out large mortgages to buy out their neighbors in 1919, and now were hard pressed.

In 1922, suffragist Ella Uphay Mowry became the first female gubernatorial candidate in the state when she ran as "Mrs. W.D. Mowry." She later stated that, "Someone had to be the pioneer. I firmly believe that some day a woman will sit in the governor's chair in Kansas."

The KKK (Ku Klux Klan) flourished briefly in the early 1920s. It faced several legal battles, and collapsed after 1925.

The flag of Kansas was designed in 1925. It was officially adopted by the Kansas State Legislature in 1927 and modified in 1961 (the word "Kansas" was added below the seal in gold block lettering). It was first flown at Fort Riley by Governor Ben S. Paulen in 1927 for the troops at Fort Riley and for the Kansas National Guard.

William Allen White in his novels and short stories, developed his idea of the small town as a metaphor for understanding social change and for preaching the necessity of community. While he expressed his views in terms of his small Kansas city, he tailored his rhetoric to the needs and values of all of urban America. The cynicism of the post-World War I world stilled his imaginary literature, but for the remainder of his life he continued to propagate his vision of small-town community. He opposed chain stores and mail order firms as a threat to the business owner on Main Street. The Great Depression shook his faith in a cooperative, selfless, middle-class America.

=== Great depression ===
The Dust Bowl was a series of dust storms caused by a massive drought that began in 1930 and lasted until 1941. The effect of the drought was overshadowed by the plunging wheat prices and the financial crisis of the Great Depression. Many local banks were forced to close. Some farmers left the land but even larger numbers of unemployed men left the cities to return to their family's farm.

The state became an eager participant in such major New Deal relief programs as the Civil Works Administration, the Federal Emergency Relief Administration, the Civilian Conservation Corps, the Works Progress Administration, which put hundreds of thousands of Kansans—mostly men—to work at unskilled labor. Most important of all were the New Deal farm programs, which raised prices of wheat and other crops and allowed economic recovery by 1936. Republican Governor Alf Landon also employed emergency measures, including a moratorium on mortgage foreclosures and a balanced budget initiative. The Agricultural Adjustment Administration succeeded in raising wheat prices after 1933, thus alleviating the most serious distress.

=== World War II ===
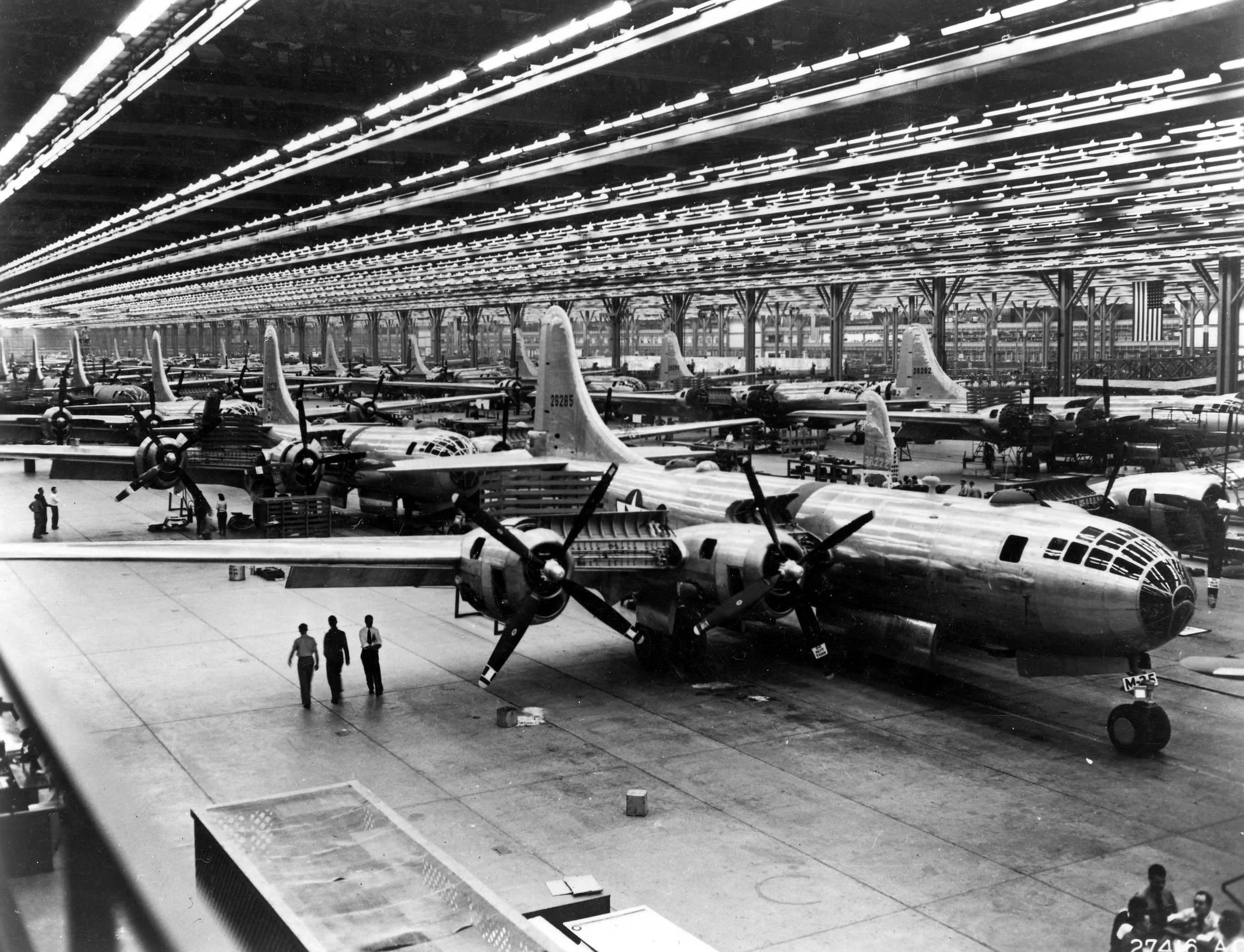
Boeing B-29 Superfortress production in Wichita in 1944

The state's main contribution to the war effort, besides tens of thousands of servicemen and servicewomen, was the enormous increase in the output of grain production. Farmers nevertheless grumbled about price ceilings for their wheat, production quotas, the movement of hired hands to well-paid factory jobs, and the shortage of farm machinery; they lobbied the Congress to make sure that young farmers were deferred from the draft.

Wichita, which had long shown an interest in aviation, became a major manufacturing center for the aircraft industry during the war, attracting tens of thousands of underemployed workers from the farms and small towns of the state.

The Women's Land Army of America (WLA) was a wartime women's labor pool organized by the U.S. Department of Agriculture. It failed to attract many town or city women to do farm work, but it succeeded in training several hundred farm wives in machine handling, safety, proper clothing, time-saving methods, and nutrition.

=== Cold War era ===
Kansas state law permitted segregated public schools, which operated in Topeka and other cities. On May 17, 1954, the Supreme Court in Brown v. Board of Education unanimously declared that separate educational facilities are inherently unequal and, as such, violate the 14th Amendment to the United States Constitution, which guarantees all citizens "equal protection of the laws." Brown v. Board of Education of Topeka explicitly outlawed de jure racial segregation of public education facilities (legal establishment of separate government-run schools for blacks and whites). The site consists of the Monroe Elementary School, one of the four segregated elementary schools for African American children in Topeka, Kansas (and the adjacent grounds).

During the 1950s and 1960s, intercontinental ballistic missiles (designed to carry a single nuclear warhead) were stationed throughout Kansas facilities. They were stored (to be launched from) hardened underground silos. The Kansas facilities were deactivated in the early 1980s.

On June 8, 1966, Topeka, Kansas was struck by an F5 rated tornado, according to the Fujita scale. The "1966 Topeka tornado" started on the southwest side of town, moving northeast, hitting various landmarks (including Washburn University). Total dollar cost was put at $100 million.

=== Recent personalities ===
Kansas was home to President Eisenhower of Abilene, presidential candidates Bob Dole and Alf Landon, and the aviator Amelia Earhart. Famous athletes from Kansas include Barry Sanders, Gale Sayers, Jim Ryun, Walter Johnson, Clint Bowyer, Maurice Greene, and Lynette Woodard.

== Sports ==
The Kansas Sports Hall of Fame chronicles the history of competitive athletics in the state.

=== College sports ===
See also Timeline of college football in Kansas

Kansas sports history includes several significant firsts. The first college football game played in Kansas was the 1890 Kansas vs. Baker football game played in Baldwin City. Baker won 22–9. The first night football game west of the Mississippi was played in Wichita, Kansas in 1905 between Cooper College (now called Sterling College) and Fairmount College (now Wichita State University). Later that year, Fairmount also played an experimental game against the Washburn Ichabods that was used to test new rules designed to make football safer.

In 1911, the Kansas Jayhawks traveled to play the Missouri Tigers for what is considered the first homecoming game ever. The first college football homecoming game ever televised was played in Manhattan between the Kansas State Wildcats and the Nebraska Cornhuskers.

The 1951 season saw the Southwestern head coach Harold Hunt gain national recognition for rejecting a touchdown in a game against Central Missouri. Hunt informed the officials that his player had stepped out of bounds, nullifying long touchdown run. Not a single one of the referees had been in a position to see him do so, but they agreed to nullify the touchdown, and returned the ball to the point where Coach Hunt said Johnson had stepped out. A photo of the run later confirmed Coach Hunt's observation.

On October 2, 1970, a plane crashed that was carrying about half of the football team for Wichita State on their way to play a game against Utah State University. 31 people were killed. The game was canceled, and the Utah State football team held a memorial service at the stadium where the game was to have been played.

=== Professional sports ===
The history of professional sports in Kansas probably dates from the establishment of the Minor League Baseball Topeka Capitals and Leavenworth Soldiers in 1886 in the Western League. The African-American Bud Fowler played on the Topeka team that season, one year before the "color line" descended in professional baseball.

In 1887, the Western League was dominated by a reorganized Topeka team called the Golden Giants – a high-priced collection of major leaguer players, including Bug Holliday, Jim Conway, Dan Stearns, Perry Werden and Jimmy Macullar, which won the league by 15½ games. On April 10, 1887, the Golden Giants also won an exhibition game from the defending World Series champions, the St. Louis Browns (the present-day Cardinals), by a score of 12–9. However, Topeka was unable to support the team, and it disbanded after one year.

The first night game in the history of professional baseball was played in Independence on April 28, 1930, when the Muscogee (Oklahoma) Indians beat the Independence Producers 13 to 3 in a minor league game sanctioned by the Western League of the Western Baseball Association with 1,500 fans attending the game. The permanent lighting system was first used for an exhibition game on April 17, 1930, between the Independence Producers and House of David semi-professional baseball team of Benton Harbor, Michigan with the Independence team winning with a score of 9 to 1 before a crowd of 1,700 spectators.

== See also ==
- Geology of Kansas
- History of the Midwestern United States
- Germans from Russia, Many of whom lived in Kansas
- Great Plains
- List of historical societies in Kansas
- Railroad land grants in the United States
- Timeline of Kansas history
- Tragic Prelude

Cities in Kansas

- Timeline of Topeka, Kansas
- History of Wichita, Kansas and Timeline

== Bibliography ==
=== Surveys and reference ===
- Arnold, Anna Estelle. A history of Kansas (1914) old textbook
- Blackmar, Frank Wilson (1912). Kansas; a cyclopedia of state history, embracing events, institutions, industries, counties, cities, towns, prominent persons, etc. Chicago: Standard Publishing. volume 1 at the Internet Archive volume 2 at the Internet Archive old alphabetical encyclopedia
- Cutler, William G. History of the State of Kansas (1883), detailed, reliable older history
- Davis, Kenneth. Kansas: A History (1984)
- Dean, Virgil W., ed. John Brown to Bob Dole: Movers and Shakers in Kansas History (2010), 27 short biographies by scholars
- Gille, Frank H. ed. Encyclopedia of Kansas Indians Tribes, Nations and People of the Plains (1999)
- Hazelrigg, Clara H. A New History of Kansas (1895) online
- Miner, Craig. Kansas: The History of the Sunflower State, 1854–2000 (2002) (ISBN 0-7006-1215-7), the newest standard history
- Napier, Rita, ed. Kansas and the West: New Perspectives (University Press of Kansas, 2003), 416pp; essays by scholars
- Rich, Everett, ed. The Heritage of Kansas: Selected Commentaries on Past Times (1960) 852pp; essays by historians and primary sources online
- Richmond, Robert. Kansas, A Land of Contrasts (4th ed. 1999)
- Socolofsky, Homer E. Kansas Governors (1990)
- Socolofsky, Homer E. and Huber Self. Historical Atlas of Kansas (1992)
- Stuewe, Paul K., ed. Kansas Revisited: Historical Images and Perspectives (2nd ed. 1998), essays by scholars
- Wishart, David J., ed. Encyclopedia of the Great Plains, University of Nebraska Press, 2004, ISBN 0-8032-4787-7. complete text online; 900 pages of scholarly articles
- Zornow, William, Kansas, A History of the Jayhawk State (1957)

=== Specialized studies ===
- Bader, Robert S. Hayseeds, Moralizers, and Methodists: The Twentieth-Century Image of Kansas (University Press of Kansas, 1988)
- Campney, Brent M. S. "'This is Not Dixie:' The Imagined South, The Kansas Free State Narrative, and the Rhetoric of Racist Violence" Southern Spaces 6 September 2007 online
- Carman, J. Neale. Foreign-Language Units of Kansas, I. Historical Atlas and Statistics (1962) detailed introduction to foreign settlement, with immigration statistics and detailed maps showing ethnic clusters.
- Castel, Albert. A Frontier State at War: Kansas, 1861–1865 (1958)
- Cordier, Mary Hurlbut. Schoolwomen of the Prairies and Plains: Personal Narratives from Iowa, Kansas, and Nebraska, 1860S-1920s (1997) online
- Dick, Everett. Vanguards of the Frontier: A Social History of the Northern Plains and Rocky Mountains from the Earliest White Contacts to the Coming of the Homemaker (1941)
- Entz, Gary R. "Religion in Kansas," Kansas History, Summer 2005, Vol. 28 Issue 2, pp 120–145, emphasis on the Civil War, Progressive Era, immigrants, and the civil rights movement
- Goldberg, Michael L. "Non-partisan and all-partisan: Rethinking woman suffrage and party politics in gilded age Kansas." Western Historical Quarterly 25.1 (1994): 21–44. online
- Goodrich, Thomas War to the Knife: Bleeding Kansas, 1854–1861 (1998).
- Ham, George E. and Robin Higham, eds. The Rise of the Wheat State: A History of Kansas Agriculture, 1861- 1986 (1987) 16 topical essays by experts. online
- Ise, John. Sod and Stubble: The Story of a Kansas Homestead (U of Nebraska Press, 1972)
- La Forte, Robert Sherman. Leaders of Reform: Progressive Republicans in Kansas, 1900-1916 (1974) online
- Lee, R. Alton. Sunflower Justice: A New History of the Kansas Supreme Court (U of Nebraska Press, 2014)
- Luebke, Frederick C., ed. Ethnicity on the Great Plains (1982)
- McQuillan, D. Aidan. Prevailing over Time: Ethnic Adjustment on the Kansas Prairies, 1875–1925 (1990)
- Malin, James. Winter Wheat in the Golden Belt of Kansas (1944)
- Malin, James. The Grassland of North America: Prolegomena to its History (1955) excerpts, pioneering environmental history
- Malin, James. History and Ecology: Studies of the Grassland (1984)
- Miner, Craig. West of Wichita: Settling the High Plains of Kansas, 1865-90 (1986) excerpt and text search
- Percy, Thomas C. Kansas State Fair (Arcadia, 2014) online.
- Press, Donald E. "Kansas Conflict: Populist Versus Railroader in the 1890s," Kansas Historical Quarterly (1977) 43#3 pp 319–333 online
- Reynolds, David. John Brown, Abolitionist (2005) (ISBN 0-375-41188-7), favorable to Brown
- Sloan, Charles William Jr. "Kansas Battles the Invisible Empire: The Legal Ouster of the KKK From Kansas, 1922-1927," Kansas Historical Quarterly (1974) 40#3 pp 393–409 online
- Socolofsky, Homer E. "Kansas in 1876" Kansas Historical Quarterly (1977) 43#1 pp 1–43 online
- Socolofsky, Homer E. Arthur Capper, publisher, politician, and philanthropist (1962).
- Underwood, June O. "Civilizing Kansas: Women's Organizations, 1880–1920." Feminist Studies 2 (1975): 150–60. online
- Van Sant, Thomas D. Improving rural lives: A history of Farm Bureau in Kansas, 1912-1992 (1993)
- Villard, Oswald Garrison, John Brown 1800–1859: A Biography Fifty Years After (1910). full text online

=== Historiography ===
- Averill, Thomas Fox. "Kansas Literature. A Review Essay." Kansas History 25 (Summer 2002): 141–165. online
- Becker, Carl L. "Kansas," in Essays in American History Dedicated to Frederick Jackson Turner (1910), 85–111, famous interpretation. online pp 85-111; Reprinted in Everett Rich, ed., The Heritage of Kansas: Selected Commentaries on Past Times (1960), pp 340–59.
- Coburn, Carol K. "Women and Gender in Kansas History. Review Essay." Kansas History 26 (Summer 2003): 126–151. online
- Grant, H. Roger. "Kansas Transportation. Review Essay." Kansas History 26 (Autumn 2003): 206–229. online
- Hurt, R. Douglas. "The Agricultural and Rural History of Kansas. Review Essay." Kansas History 27 (Autumn 2004): 194–217. online
- Johannsen, Robert W. "James C. Malin: An Appreciation," Kansas Historical Quarterly (1972) 38#4 pp. 457–66 online
- Leiker, James. "Race Relations in the Sunflower State. A Review Essay." Kansas History 25 (Autumn 2002): 214–236. online
- Malin, James C. Essays on historiography (1946) online
- Nichols, Roy F. "The Kansas-Nebraska Act: A Century of Historiography." Mississippi Valley Historical Review 43 (September 1956): 187–212. in JSTOR
- Sanborn, F. B. (February 1908). "The Early History of Kansas, 1854–1861". Proceedings of the Massachusetts Historical Society. 3rd. 1, [Vol. 41 of continuous numbering]: 331–359. JSTOR 25079946.
- Socolofsky, Homer E. and Virgil W. Dean. Kansas History: An Annotated Bibliography (1992) excerpt and text search
- Turk, Eleanor L. "Germans in Kansas. Review Essay." Kansas History 28 (Spring 2005): 44–71. online

=== Primary sources ===
- Averill, Thomas Fox, ed., What Kansas Means to Me: Twentieth-Century Writers on the Sunflower State (University Press of Kansas, 1991)
- Cordier, Mary Hurlbut. Schoolwomen of the Prairies and Plains: Personal Narratives from Iowa, Kansas, and Nebraska, 1860S-1920s (1997) online
- Missouri Pacific Railway Company. Facts about Kansas: a book for home-seekers and home-builders. Statistics from state and national reports. Farm lands, grazing lands, fruit lands. The unsurpassed and limitless resources of the great corn and wheat producing state. (1891) online
- Robinson, Sara. Kansas, Its Interior and Exterior Life: Including a Full View of Its Settlement, Political History, Social Life, Climate, Soil, Productions, Scenery, Etc. (1856) full text online
  - Courtwright, Julie. "'A Goblin That Drives Her Insane': Sara Robinson and the History Wars of Kansas, 1894–1911." Kansas History 25 (Summer 2002): 102–123. online
- Stratton, Joanna. Pioneer Women: Voices from the Kansas Frontier (1982), autobiographical accounts excerpt and text search
- White, William Allen. "What's the matter with Kansas?" (1896) online
