= Timeline of Kansas history =

Important dates in Kansas's history

Flag of Kansas

July–August 1541
Coronado explores Kansas
April 30, 1803
Louisiana Purchase; US buys most of Kansas
May 30, 1854
Kansas Territory organized
July 29, 1859
Constitution adopted by convention; prohibits slavery
January 29, 1861
Kansas becomes 34th state
August 21, 1863
Quantrill's Raid on Lawrence
Spring 1879
Exodusters
February 19, 1881
First state to prohibit alcohol
1890s
Populist Revolt
July 1951
Great Flood of 1951
May 1954
Brown v. Board of Education of Topeka

The timeline of Kansas details past events that happened in what is present day Kansas. Located on the eastern edge of the Great Plains, the U.S. state of Kansas was the home of sedentary agrarian and hunter-gatherer Native American societies, many of whom hunted American bison. The region first appears in western history in the 16th century at the time of the Spanish conquest of the Aztec Empire, when Spanish conquistadors explored the unknown land now known as Kansas. It was later explored by French fur trappers who traded with the Native Americans. It became part of the United States in the Louisiana Purchase of 1803. In the 19th century, the first American explorers designated the area as the "Great American Desert."

When the area was opened to Euro-American settlement in the 1850s, Kansas became the first battlefield in the conflict in the American Civil War. After the war, Kansas was home to Wild West towns servicing the cattle trade. With the railroads came heavy immigration from the East, from Europe, and from Freedmen called "Exodusters". For much of its history, Kansas has had a rural economy based on wheat and other crops, supplemented by oil and railroads. Since 1945 the farm population has sharply declined and manufacturing has become more important, typified by the aircraft industry of Wichita.

== Early history ==
- 10,000-9000 BCE: First evidence of human beings in Kansas
- 1450: Wichita people founded the historical city of Etzanoa, near the modern day Arkansas City.
- 1500–1800: Proto-historic indigenous peoples in Kansas include the Pawnee, Kansa, Wichita, and Apache.
- 1541: Francisco Vásquez de Coronado, the Spanish conquistador, visits Kansas.
- 17th century: Kansa (sometimes Kaw) and Osage Nation arrive in Kansas. (The Kansa claim that they occupied the territory since 1674.)
- 1650–1750: Dismal River culture, relatives of the Plains Apache built villages in Kansas.
- 1664: Taos Pueblo Indians found refuge in Scott County, Kansas after fleeing the Spaniards.
- 1702: El Cuartelejo Pueblo is built by Picuris Pueblo people, who fled the Spanish in New Mexico.
- 1719: First Europeans visit the Northern Pawnees.1724: French commander at Fort Orleans, Etienne de Bourgmont, visits the Kansas River and establishes a trading post here, near the main Kansa village at the mouth of the river. Around the same time, the Otoe tribe of the Sioux also inhabit various areas around the northeast corner of Kansas.
- 1780: The Kansa tribe moves its village further up the Kansas River to the junction of the Big Blue River, the current site of Manhattan, Kansas. The settlement is named Blue Earth Village.
- End of the 18th century: Kansa and Osage Nation dominant in the eastern part of the state — the Kansa on the Kansas River to the north and the Osage on the Arkansas River to the south. Pawnees were dominant on the plains to the west and north of the Kansa and Osage nations, in regions home to massive herds of buffalo.
- 1803: Kansas, as part of the Louisiana Purchase, annexed to the United States as unorganized territory.
- 1806: Zebulon Pike passes through the region, and labels it "the Great American Desert" on his maps.
- 1812: The Kansa and Pawnee fight a large battle at Blue Earth Village.

== 1820s to 1840s: Indian treaties and westward trails ==
- 1820s: Kansas area (by then popularly known as the Great American Desert) is set aside as Indian territory by the U.S. government and closed to settlement by whites.
- 1821: After a brief period as part of Missouri Territory, Kansas returned to unorganized status.
- 1821: Santa Fe Trail was opened across Kansas as country's transportation route to the Southwest, connecting Missouri with Santa Fe, New Mexico.
- 1825, June 3: 20 million acres (81000 km^{2}) of land ceded by the Kansa Nation to the United States, and the Kansa tribe are thereafter limited to a specific reservation in northeast Kansas.
- 1825, June: Osage Nation was limited to a reservation in southeast Kansas.
- 1825, November 7: Missouri Shawanoes (or Shawnees) are the first Native Americans removed to the territory by treaty.
- 1827, May 8: Cantonment Leavenworth, or Fort Leavenworth, (named in honor of Henry Leavenworth) built just inside Indian territory to guard travelers on the United States' Western frontier. This was the first permanent settlement of white Americans in the future state of Kansas.
- 1830: Indian Removal Act expedites the process of Indian removal.
- 1831, August 30: Ottawa cede land to the United States and move to a small reservation on the Kansas River and its branches.
- 1832, April 6: Ottawa treaty ratified.
- 1832, October 24: U.S. government moves the Kickapoos to a reservation in Kansas.
- 1832, October 29: Piankeshaws and Weas agree to occupy 250 sections of land, bounded on the north by the Shawanoes; east by the western boundary line of Missouri; and west by the Kaskaskias and Peorias.
- 1833, September 21: Treaty made with the United States and the Otoe tribe cedes their country south of the Little Nemaha River.
- 1836, September 17: The confederacy of the Sacs and Foxes in a treaty with the United States moved north of Kickapoos.
- 1837, February 11: United States agrees to convey to the Potawatomis an area on the Osage River, southwest of the Missouri River.
- 1840s: Section of the Santa Fe Trail through Kansas also used by emigrants on the California Trail and Oregon Trail.
- 1842: Treaty between the United States and the Wyandots, the Wyandots moved to the junction of the Kansas and Missouri Rivers (on land that was shared with the Delaware until 1843).
- 1844: The Great Flood of 1844, the biggest flood ever recorded on the Missouri River and Upper Mississippi River
- 1846: Kansa reservation reduced by treaty.
- 1847: Potawatomis are moved again, to an area containing 576,000 acres (2,330 km^{2}), being the eastern part of the lands ceded to the United States by the Kansa tribe in 1846.

== 1850 to 1854: Washington opens the territory; Indian tribes sell their lands ==
- 1850: Americans pioneers demand the entire area to be opened for settlement.
- 1851, September 17: Cheyenne and Arapahoe tribes negotiate with the United States for land in western Kansas (the current state of Colorado).
- 1852: Congress begins the process of creating the Kansas Territory.
- 1852, December 13: Representative from Missouri submits a bill organizing the Territory of Platte to the House: all the tract lying west of Iowa and Missouri, and extending west to the Rocky Mountains.
- 1852: Wyandots attempts to establish a Territorial government in their section of Indian territory.
- 1854: Nearly all the tribes in the eastern part of the Territory cede the greater part of their lands prior to the passage of the Kansas territorial act and are eventually moved south to the Indian Territory (the future state of Oklahoma.)
- 1854, May 30: After intense debate the Kansas–Nebraska Act becomes law, establishing the Nebraska Territory and Kansas Territory, which delineate the borders of Kansas Territory set from the Missouri border to the summit of the Rocky Mountain range; the southern boundary was the 37th parallel north, the northern was the 40th parallel north. North of the 40th parallel was Nebraska Territory.
- 1854: A new antislavery party is formed in protest: the Republican Party
- 1854, June 10: Missourians hold a meeting at Salt Creek Valley, a trading post three miles (5 km) west of Fort Leavenworth, at which a "Squatter's Claim Association" is organized.

== 1855 to 1859: State formation ==
- 1855: Massachusetts Emigrant Aid Company arrange and send anti-slavery settlers into Kansas.
- 1855, March 30: Missourians who had streamed across the border (known as "Border Ruffians") fill the ballot boxes in favor of pro-slavery candidates. As a result, pro-slavery candidates prevail at every polling district except one (the future Riley County), and the first official legislature is overwhelmingly composed of pro-slavery delegates.
- 1855: Kansas Territory violence and some open battles rise.
- 1855, November 11: Topeka Constitution adopted by a convention of Free-Staters.
- 1855, December 1: Small army of Missourians, acting under the command of Douglas County, Kansas Sheriff Samuel J. Jones, laid siege to the Free-State stronghold of Lawrence in what would later become known as "The Wakarusa War."
- 1855, December 15: Topeka Constitution was approved by the people of the Territory but was never accepted as a legal document.
- 1856, May 21: Pro-slavery forces led by Sheriff Jones again attack Lawrence, killing two men, burning the Free-State Hotel to the ground, destroying two printing presses, and robbing homes.
- 1856, night of May 24 to the morning of May 25: Pottawatomie massacre; in what appears to be a reaction to the Sacking of Lawrence, John Brown and a band of abolitionists (some of them members of the Pottawatomie Rifles) murder five settlers, rumored to be pro-slavery, with broadswords north of Pottawatomie Creek in Franklin County, Kansas; Brown and his men flee to Iowa.
- 1857, November 7: Lecompton Constitution adopted by a Convention convened by the official pro-slavery government.
- 1858: Kansas Territory violence and some open battles slow.
- 1858, April 3: Leavenworth Constitution adopted by the convention at Leavenworth by a new Free-State legislature.
- 1858, May 18: People's elections pass the Leavenworth Constitution (while the Lecompton Constitution is still under consideration), but Congress refuses to ratify it.
- 1859: Land tracts transferred to individual Chippewa families.
- 1859, July 29: Fourth constitution drafted; the Wyandotte Constitution adopted by the convention.
- 1859, October 4: People's election held; adopts Wyandotte Constitution, which outlaws slavery but is far less progressive than the Leavenworth Constitution.
- 1859, end of the year: Bleeding Kansas violence virtually ceases.

== 1860s to 1890s ==
- 1861, January 29: Kansas was admitted into the Union as a free state under the Wyandotte Constitution.
- 1861, May 25:Great Seal of the State of Kansas was established by a joint resolution adopted by the Kansas Legislature.
- 1861, June 3: First Kansas regiment called to duty in the American Civil War.
- 1863: The Union Pacific Eastern Division established in Kansas.
- 1863, August 21: William Quantrill leads Quantrill's Raid into Lawrence destroying much of the city and killing over a hundred people.
- 1863, October 6: Battle of Baxter Springs, sometimes called the Baxter Springs Massacre, a minor battle in the War, occurs near the modern-day town of Baxter Springs, Kansas.
- 1864, April: War between the Indians upon frontier settlers in Kansas and Nebraska.
- 1864, July 28: Seventeenth Kansas regiment is the last to be raised during the Civil War.
- 1864, October 25: Battle of Marais des Cygnes in Linn County, Kansas.
- 1867: Joseph G. McCoy builds stockyards in Abilene, Kansas and helps develop the Chisholm Trail, encouraging Texas cattlemen to undertake cattle drives to his stockyards.
- 1869: Union Pacific Eastern Division renamed the Kansas Pacific.
- 1871: Wild Bill Hickok becomes marshal of Abilene, Kansas.
- 1885: Coronado, Kansas, established.
- 1887, February 27: shoot-out with boosters — some would say hired gunmen — from nearby Leoti leaves several people dead and wounded.
- 1877: Nicodemus, the first all-black town in Kansas, is founded by African-American migrants from Kentucky.
- 1879: large number of former slaves move from Southern states to Kansas.
- 1881, February 19: Kansas becomes the first U.S. state to adopt a Constitutional amendment prohibiting all alcoholic beverages.
- 1890, November 22: College football comes to Kansas in the 1890 Kansas vs. Baker football game.
- 1897, July–August: First Baha'i community in Kansas, second in western hemisphere, began in Enterprise, initiating the Kansas Baha'i community.

== 20th century ==
- 1916: Kansas troops serve on the U.S.-Mexico border during the Mexican Revolution.
- 1922 and 1927: legal battles Kansas against the Ku Klux Klan, resulting in their expulsion from the state.
- 1925: Flag of Kansas designed by Hazel Avery.
- 1928: Charles Curtis of Topeka, first Native American to be elected as vice-president of United States
- 1927: flag officially adopted by the Kansas State Legislature.
- 1930: The Independence Producers played the first Night game in the history of Organized Baseball, making Independence, Kansas the birthplace of professional night baseball.
- 1951: The Great Flood of 1951 affected eastern Kansas and Missouri
- 1954, May 17: US Supreme Court in Brown v. Board of Education unanimously declared that separate educational facilities are inherently unequal and, as such, violate the Fourteenth Amendment to the United States Constitution, which guarantees all citizens "equal protection of the laws."
- 1950s and 1960s: Intercontinental ballistic missiles (designed to carry a single nuclear warhead) stationed throughout Kansas facilities, ready to launch from hardened underground silos.
- 1961: State flag modified with the word "Kansas" added below the seal in gold block lettering.
- 1966, June 8: Topeka, Kansas was struck by an F5 rated tornado, according to the Fujita scale. The "1966 Topeka tornado" started on the southwest side of town, moving northeast, hitting various landmarks (including Washburn University). Total cost was put at $100 million.
- 1980s: Kansas intercontinental ballistic missile facilities are deactivated.
- 1993: The Great Flood of 1993 affects several states, including Kansas

== 21st century ==
- 2006: Restoration of Kansas State House Begins.
- 2007, May 4–6: The city of Greensburg is destroyed by a tornado.
- 2013: Restoration of Kansas State House Completed.
- 2022: A tornado rips through Andover, Kansas

== See also ==
- Geology of Kansas
- History of Kansas
- List of Kansas state legislatures
- Timeline of college football in Kansas

Cities in Kansas

- Timeline of Topeka, Kansas
- Timeline of Wichita, Kansas
