= List of Kansas state legislatures =

The legislature of the U.S. state of Kansas has convened many times since statehood became effective on January 29, 1861. It continues to operate under the amended 1859 Constitution of Kansas. As of 2024, the Kansas Legislature has been called to special session 26 times by the state's governors.

== List of legislatures and sessions ==
Ordinal	Legislature	Session type	Convened	Adjourned	House journal	Senate journal (Note: The upper house of the territorial legislature was called the council.)
Territorial legislatures
1st	1855 Kansas Territorial Legislature	regular	July 2, 1855	August 30, 1855		
2nd	1857 Kansas Territorial Legislature	regular	January 12, 1857	February 20, 1857		
2nd	1857 Kansas Territorial Legislature	special	December 7, 1857	December 17, 1857		
3rd	1858 Kansas Territorial Legislature	regular	January 4, 1858	February 13, 1858		
4th	1859 Kansas Territorial Legislature	regular	January 3, 1859	February 11, 1859	[?]	
5th	1860 Kansas Territorial Legislature	regular	January 2, 1860	January 18, 1860		[?]
5th	1860 Kansas Territorial Legislature	special	January 19, 1860	February 27, 1860		[?]
6th	1861 Kansas Territorial Legislature	regular	January 7, 1861	February 2, 1861	[?]	
State legislatures
1st (1st annual)	1861 Kansas Legislature	regular	March 26, 1861	June 4, 1861		
2nd (2nd annual)	1862 Kansas Legislature	regular	January 14, 1862	March 6, 1862		
3rd (3rd annual)	1863 Kansas Legislature	regular	January 13, 1863	March 3, 1863		
4th (4th annual)	1864 Kansas Legislature	regular	January 12, 1864	March 1, 1864		
5th (5th annual)	1865 Kansas Legislature	regular	January 10, 1865	March 3, 1865		
6th (6th annual)	1866 Kansas Legislature	regular	January 9, 1866	February 27, 1866		
7th (7th annual)	1867 Kansas Legislature	regular	January 8, 1867	February 26, 1867		
8th (8th annual)	1868 Kansas Legislature	regular	January 14, 1868	March 3, 1868		
9th (9th annual)	1869 Kansas Legislature	regular	January 12, 1869	March 4, 1869	[?]	
10th (10th annual)	1870 Kansas Legislature	regular	January 11, 1870	March 3, 1870		
11th (11th annual)	1871 Kansas Legislature	regular	January 10, 1871	March 3, 1871		
12th (12th annual)	1872 Kansas Legislature	regular	January 9, 1872	March 2, 1872		
13th (13th annual)	1873 Kansas Legislature	regular	January 14, 1873	March 7, 1873		
14th (14th annual)	1874 Kansas Legislature	regular	January 13, 1874	March 10, 1874		
14th (14th annual)	1874 Kansas Legislature	special	September 15, 1874	September 22, 1874		
15th (15th annual)	1875 Kansas Legislature	regular	January 12, 1875	March 8, 1875		
16th (16th annual)	1876 Kansas Legislature	regular	January 11, 1876	March 4, 1876		
17th (17th annual)	1877 Kansas Legislature	regular	January 9, 1877	March 7, 1877		
18th (1st biennial)	1879 Kansas Legislature	regular	January 14, 1879	March 12, 1879		
19th (2nd biennial)	1881 Kansas Legislature	regular	January 11, 1881	March 5, 1881		
20th (3rd biennial)	1883–1884 Kansas Legislature	regular	January 9, 1883	March 8, 1883		
20th (3rd biennial)	1883–1884 Kansas Legislature	special	March 18, 1884	March 24, 1884		
21st (4th biennial)	1885–1886 Kansas Legislature	regular	January 13, 1885	March 7, 1885		
21st (4th biennial)	1885–1886 Kansas Legislature	special	January 19, 1886	February 20, 1886		
22nd (5th biennial)	1887 Kansas Legislature	regular	January 11, 1887	March 5, 1887		
23rd (6th biennial)	1889 Kansas Legislature	regular	January 8, 1889	March 4, 1889		
24th (7th biennial)	1891 Kansas Legislature	regular	January 13, 1891	March 13, 1891		
25th (8th biennial)	1893 Kansas Legislature	regular	January 10, 1893	March 11, 1893 (Note: The 1893 session had two competing the houses, the Populist "Dunsmore House" and the "Douglass House," named after their speakers. The state supreme court ruled that the Douglass House was the legitimate body, and the Dunsmore House adjourned on February 28, 1893, merging with the Douglass House.)		
26th (9th biennial)	1895 Kansas Legislature	regular	January 8, 1895	March 8, 1895		
27th (10th biennial)	1897–1899 Kansas Legislature	regular	January 12, 1897	March 20, 1897		
27th (10th biennial)	1897–1899 Kansas Legislature	special	December 21, 1898	January 9, 1899		
28th (11th biennial)	1899 Kansas Legislature	regular	January 10, 1899	March 8, 1899		
29th (12th biennial)	1901 Kansas Legislature	regular	January 8, 1901	March 9, 1901		
30th (13th biennial)	1903 Kansas Legislature	regular	January 13, 1903	March 13, 1903		
30th (13th biennial)	1903 Kansas Legislature	special	June 24, 1903	June 26, 1903		
31st (14th biennial)	1905 Kansas Legislature	regular	January 10, 1905	March 10, 1905		
32nd (15th biennial)	1907–1908 Kansas Legislature	regular	January 8, 1907	March 14, 1907		
32nd (15th biennial)	1907–1908 Kansas Legislature	special	January 16, 1908	February 4, 1908		
33rd (16th biennial)	1909 Kansas Legislature	regular	January 12, 1909	March 13, 1909		
34th (17th biennial)	1911 Kansas Legislature	regular	January 10, 1911	March 15, 1911		
35th (18th biennial)	1913 Kansas Legislature	regular	January 14, 1913	March 17, 1913	pt. 1, pt. 2	pt. 1, pt. 2
36th (19th biennial)	1915 Kansas Legislature	regular	January 12, 1915	March 24, 1915	pt. 1, pt. 2	
37th (20th biennial)	1917 Kansas Legislature	regular	January 9, 1917	March 14, 1917	pt. 1, pt. 2	
38th (21st biennial)	1919–1920 Kansas Legislature	regular	January 14, 1919	March 22, 1919		
38th (21st biennial)	1919–1920 Kansas Legislature	special	June 16, 1919	June 19, 1919		
38th (21st biennial)	1919–1920 Kansas Legislature	special	January 5, 1920	January 27, 1920		
39th (22nd biennial)	1921 Kansas Legislature	regular	January 11, 1921	March 21, 1921	pt. 1, pt. 2	pt. 1, pt. 2
40th (23rd biennial)	1923 Kansas Legislature	regular	January 9, 1923	March 22, 1923	pt. 1, pt. 2	pt. 1, pt. 2
40th (23rd biennial)	1923 Kansas Legislature	special	August 6, 1923	August 14, 1923		
41st (24th biennial)	1925 Kansas Legislature	regular	January 13, 1925	March 18, 1925	pt. 1, pt. 2	pt. 1, pt. 2
42nd (25th biennial)	1927–1928 Kansas Legislature	regular	January 11, 1927	March 23, 1927	pt. 1, pt. 2	pt. 1, pt. 2
42nd (25th biennial)	1927–1928 Kansas Legislature	special	July 19, 1928	July 21, 1928		
43rd (26th biennial)	1929–1930 Kansas Legislature	regular	January 8, 1929	March 16, 1929	pt. 1, pt. 2	pt. 1, pt. 2
43rd (26th biennial)	1929–1930 Kansas Legislature	special	February 27, 1930	March 12, 1930		
44th (27th biennial)	1931 Kansas Legislature	regular	January 13, 1931	March 17, 1931	pt. 1, pt. 2	pt. 1, pt. 2
45th (28th biennial)	1933–1934 Kansas Legislature	regular	January 10, 1933	March 24, 1933	pt. 1, pt. 2	
45th (28th biennial)	1933–1934 Kansas Legislature	special	October 30, 1933	December 4, 1933		
45th (28th biennial)	1933–1934 Kansas Legislature	special	March 1, 1934	March 7, 1934		
46th (29th biennial)	1935–1936 Kansas Legislature	regular	January 8, 1935	March 13, 1935	pt. 1, pt. 2	pt. 1, pt. 2
46th (29th biennial)	1935–1936 Kansas Legislature	special	July 7, 1936	July 13, 1936		
47th (30th biennial)	1937–1938 Kansas Legislature	regular	January 12, 1937	April 2, 1937	pt. 1, pt. 2	pt. 1, pt. 2
47th (30th biennial)	1937–1938 Kansas Legislature	special	February 7, 1938	March 4, 1938		
48th (31st biennial)	1939 Kansas Legislature	regular	January 10, 1939	April 3, 1939	pt. 1, pt. 2	pt. 1, pt. 2
49th (32nd biennial)	1941 Kansas Legislature	regular	January 14, 1941	April 9, 1941	pt. 1, pt. 2	pt. 1, pt. 2
50th (33rd biennial)	1943 Kansas Legislature	regular	January 12, 1943	March 23, 1943		
51st (34th biennial)	1945 Kansas Legislature	regular	January 9, 1945	March 31, 1945		
52nd (35th biennial)	1947 Kansas Legislature	regular	January 14, 1947	April 9, 1947		
53rd (36th biennial)	1949 Kansas Legislature	regular	January 11, 1949	April 5, 1949		
54th (37th biennial)	1951 Kansas Legislature	regular	January 9, 1951	March 31, 1951		
55th (38th biennial)	1953 Kansas Legislature	regular	January 13, 1953	April 2, 1953		
56th (39th biennial)	1955–1956 Kansas Legislature	regular	January 11, 1955	April 6, 1955		
56th (39th biennial)	1955–1956 Kansas Legislature	budget	January 10, 1956	May 8, 1956		
57th (40th biennial)	1957–1958 Kansas Legislature	regular	January 8, 1957	April 8, 1957		
57th (40th biennial)	1957–1958 Kansas Legislature	budget	January 14, 1958	February 12, 1958		
57th (40th biennial)	1957–1958 Kansas Legislature	special	April 21, 1958	May 9, 1958		
58th (41st biennial)	1959–1960 Kansas Legislature	regular	January 13, 1959	March 28, 1959		
58th (41st biennial)	1959–1960 Kansas Legislature	budget	January 12, 1960	February 10, 1960		
59th (42nd biennial)	1961–1962 Kansas Legislature	regular	January 19, 1961	April 14, 1961		
59th (42nd biennial)	1961–1962 Kansas Legislature	budget	January 9, 1962	February 7, 1962		
60th (43rd biennial)	1963–1964 Kansas Legislature	regular	January 8, 1963	April 16, 1963	pt. 1, pt. 2	
60th (43rd biennial)	1963–1964 Kansas Legislature	budget	January 14, 1964	February 11, 1964		
60th (43rd biennial)	1963–1964 Kansas Legislature	special	February 17, 1964	February 22, 1964		
61st (44th biennial)	1965–1966 Kansas Legislature	regular	January 12, 1965	April 23, 1965		
61st (44th biennial)	1965–1966 Kansas Legislature	budget	January 11, 1966	February 9, 1966		
61st (44th biennial)	1965–1966 Kansas Legislature	special	February 15, 1966	March 9, 1966		
62nd (45th biennial)	1967–1968 Kansas Legislature	regular	January 10, 1967	April 21, 1967		
62nd (45th biennial)	1967–1968 Kansas Legislature	regular	January 9, 1968	March 8, 1968		
63rd	1969–1970 Kansas Legislature	regular	January 14, 1969	April 26, 1969		
63rd	1969–1970 Kansas Legislature	regular	January 13, 1970	March 23, 1970		
64th	1971–1972 Kansas Legislature	regular	January 12, 1971	April 20, 1971		
64th	1971–1972 Kansas Legislature	regular	January 11, 1972	March 28, 1972		
65th	1973–1974 Kansas Legislature	regular	January 9, 1973	April 26, 1973		
65th	1973–1974 Kansas Legislature	regular	January 8, 1974	April 3, 1974		
66th	1975–1976 Kansas Legislature	regular	January 13, 1975	May 6, 1975		
66th	1975–1976 Kansas Legislature	regular	January 12, 1976	May 4, 1976		
67th	1977–1978 Kansas Legislature	regular	January 10, 1977	May 11, 1977		
67th	1977–1978 Kansas Legislature	regular	January 9, 1978	May 11, 1978		
68th	1979–1980 Kansas Legislature	regular	January 8, 1979	May 14, 1979		
68th	1979–1980 Kansas Legislature	regular	January 14, 1980	May 21, 1980		
69th	1981–1982 Kansas Legislature	regular	January 12, 1981	May 29, 1981		
69th	1981–1982 Kansas Legislature	regular	January 11, 1982	May 14, 1982		
70th	1983–1984 Kansas Legislature	regular	January 10, 1983	June 3, 1983		
70th	1983–1984 Kansas Legislature	regular	January 9, 1984	June 1, 1984		
71st	1985–1986 Kansas Legislature	regular	January 14, 1985	June 7, 1985		
71st	1985–1986 Kansas Legislature	regular	January 13, 1986	June 6, 1986		
72nd	1987–1988 Kansas Legislature	regular	January 12, 1987	May 21, 1987		
72nd	1987–1988 Kansas Legislature	special	August 31, 1987	September 5, 1987		
72nd	1987–1988 Kansas Legislature	regular	January 11, 1988	June 3, 1988		
73rd	1989–1990 Kansas Legislature	regular	January 9, 1989	June 26, 1989		
73rd	1989–1990 Kansas Legislature	special	December 8, 1989	December 9, 1989		
73rd	1989–1990 Kansas Legislature	regular	January 8, 1990	June 1, 1990		
74th	1991–1992 Kansas Legislature	regular	January 14, 1991	May 28, 1991		
74th	1991–1992 Kansas Legislature	regular	January 13, 1992	May 26, 1992		
75th	1993–1994 Kansas Legislature	regular	January 11, 1993	June 7, 1993		
75th	1993–1994 Kansas Legislature	regular	January 10, 1994	May 23, 1994		
76th	1995–1996 Kansas Legislature	regular	January 9, 1995	May 22, 1995		
76th	1995–1996 Kansas Legislature	regular	January 8, 1996	May 23, 1996		
77th	1997–1998 Kansas Legislature	regular	January 13, 1997	May 27, 1997		
77th	1997–1998 Kansas Legislature	regular	January 12, 1998	May 26, 1998		
78th	1999–2000 Kansas Legislature	regular	January 11, 1999	May 25, 1999		
78th	1999–2000 Kansas Legislature	regular	January 10, 2000	May 24, 2000		
79th	2001–2002 Kansas Legislature	regular	January 8, 2001	May 31, 2001		
79th	2001–2002 Kansas Legislature	regular	January 14, 2002	May 31, 2002		
80th	2003–2004 Kansas Legislature	regular	January 13, 2003	May 29, 2003		
80th	2003–2004 Kansas Legislature	regular	January 12, 2004	May 27, 2004		
81st	2005–2006 Kansas Legislature	regular	January 10, 2005	May 20, 2005		
81st	2005–2006 Kansas Legislature	special	June 22, 2005	July 6, 2005		
81st	2005–2006 Kansas Legislature	regular	January 9, 2006	May 25, 2006		
82nd	2007–2008 Kansas Legislature	regular	January 8, 2007	May 22, 2007		
82nd	2007–2008 Kansas Legislature	regular	January 14, 2008	May 29, 2008		
83rd	2009–2010 Kansas Legislature	regular	January 12, 2009	June 4, 2009		
83rd	2009–2010 Kansas Legislature	regular	January 11, 2010	May 28, 2010		
84th	2011–2012 Kansas Legislature	regular	January 10, 2011	June 1, 2011		
84th	2011–2012 Kansas Legislature	regular	January 9, 2012	June 1, 2012		
85th	2013–2014 Kansas Legislature	regular	January 14, 2013	June 20, 2013		
85th	2013–2014 Kansas Legislature	special	September 3, 2013	September 4, 2013		
85th	2013–2014 Kansas Legislature	regular	January 13, 2014	May 30, 2014		
86th	2015–2016 Kansas Legislature	regular	January 12, 2015	June 26, 2015		
86th	2015–2016 Kansas Legislature	regular	January 11, 2016	June 1, 2016		
86th	2015–2016 Kansas Legislature	special	June 23, 2016	June 24, 2016		
87th	2017–2018 Kansas Legislature	regular	January 9, 2017	June 26, 2017		
87th	2017–2018 Kansas Legislature	regular	January 8, 2018	May 4, 2018		
88th	2019–2020 Kansas Legislature	regular	January 14, 2019	May 29, 2019		
88th	2019–2020 Kansas Legislature	regular	January 13, 2020	May 21, 2020		
88th	2019–2020 Kansas Legislature	special	June 3, 2020	June 4, 2020		
89th	2021–2022 Kansas Legislature	regular	January 11, 2021	May 26, 2021		
89th	2021–2022 Kansas Legislature	special	November 22, 2021	November 22, 2021		
89th	2021–2022 Kansas Legislature	regular	January 10, 2022	May 23, 2022		
90th	2023–2024 Kansas Legislature	regular	January 9, 2023	April 28, 2023		
90th	2023–2024 Kansas Legislature	regular	January 8, 2024	April 30, 2024		
90th	2023–2024 Kansas Legislature	special	June 18, 2024	June 18, 2024		
91st	2025–2026 Kansas Legislature	regular	January 13, 2025	present	[?]	[?]

== See also ==
- List of speakers of the Kansas House of Representatives
- List of governors of Kansas
- Politics of Kansas
- Elections in Kansas
- Kansas State Capitol
- Timeline of Kansas history
- Lists of United States state legislative sessions
