= Timeline of Wichita, Kansas =

The following is a timeline of the history of the city of Wichita, Kansas, USA.

== Prior to 20th century ==
- 1864 - Jesse Chisholm establishes a trading post
- 1865 - Treaty of Little Arkansas
- 1868 - James R. Mead established another trading post
- 1870 - City of Wichita incorporated in Sedgwick County, Kansas.
- 1872
  - Santa Fe Railway built.
  - The Wichita Eagle and The Wichita Daily Beacon newspapers begins publication.
- 1880 - Wichita annexed the Delano community on the west side of the river, which then became locally known as "West Wichita".
- 1885 - Topeka State Journal newspaper in publication.
- 1887
  - Women enfranchised.
  - Roman Catholic Diocese of Wichita established.
- 1888
  - Wichita Children's Home founded
  - All Hallows Academy established.
- 1889 - Albert Hyde invents Mentholatum
- 1890 - Sedgwick County Courthouse built.
- 1891 - Thursday Afternoon Cooking Club founded.
- 1892 - Fairmount Institute opens, later becomes Wichita State University.
- 1898 - Garfield University established, later becomes Friends University.
- 1900 - December 27: Temperance activist "Carry Nation smashes the Hotel Carey saloon."

== 20th century ==
- 1905 - Waco Elementary School built.
- 1909
  - City commission form of government adopted.
  - Wichita Union Stockyards Exchange Building constructed.
- 1910 - First Presbyterian Church and Municipal Forum built.
- 1911
  - Henry's (clothiers) in business.
  - Central Intermediate School was built.
- 1912 - Wesley Medical Center established.
- 1915 - Wichita City Library built.
- 1917 - Office of city manager established.
- 1918
  - Fountain installed at Union Station Plaza.
  - Exposition Building constructed.
- 1919 - The Negro Star newspaper in publication.
- 1920 - Population: 72,217.
- 1921 - White Castle (restaurant) in business.
- 1922 - Orpheum Theatre and Miller Theater open.
- 1924 - Wichita East High School built.
- 1926 - Municipal University of Wichita established, later becomes Wichita State University.
- 1927 - Cessna Aircraft Company in business.
- 1929
  - Wichita Municipal Airport construction begins, later becomes McConnell Air Force Base.
  - Wichita North High School built.
- 1931 - McKnight memorial statue erected.
- 1932
  - Beech Aircraft Corp. in business.
  - United States Post Office and Federal Building constructed.
  - Minisa Bridge dedicated.
- 1934 - Lawrence Athletic Field opened, later becomes Lawrence–Dumont Stadium.
- 1935 - Wichita Art Museum built.
- 1950 - Population: 168,279.
- 1952 - Old Cowtown Museum established.
- 1953
  - Wichita Mid-Continent Airport built, later becomes Wichita Dwight D. Eisenhower National Airport.
  - US military Wichita Air Force Base in use.
  - Field House at University of Wichita built, later becomes Charles Koch Arena.
- 1954
  - Wichita Audubon Society founded.
  - Autopilot invented by David D. Blanton
- 1958
  - July: Dockum Drug Store sit-in for civil rights.
  - Pizza Hut in business.
- 1964 - Wichita State University established.
- 1965 - The Wichita State University Shockers men's basketball team makes its first ever appearance in the Final Four.
- 1967 - Central Wichita Public Library building dedicated.
- 1969
  - Century II opened, after razing blocks of the warehouse district south of Douglas Street.
  - Cessna Stadium expansion of Veteran Field at Wichita State University was built.
  - 250 Douglas Place hi-rise built.
- 1970 - Population: 276,554.
- 1971 - Sedgwick County Zoo founded.
- 1972 - Kansas African American Museum founded.
- 1975 - Towne East Square shopping mall in business.
- 1976 - Mid-America All-Indian Center established.
- 1977 - Kansas Coliseum opens.
- 1979 - April 15: Herman Hill riot.
- 1980 - Towne West Square shopping mall in business.
- 1984 - Kansas Food Bank established.
- 1987 - Botanica, The Wichita Gardens open.
- 1989 - Epic Center hi-rise built.
- 1990 - Population: 304,011
- 1991 - The Wichita-Andover, KS F5 tornado strikes
- 1992 - Wichita Thunder ice hockey team formed.
- 1993 - Southwind Sangha Sōtō Zen Association founded.
- 1997 - City website online (approximate date).

== 21st century ==
- 2006 - Spirit AeroSystems Inc. in business.
- 2009 - May 31: Assassination of George Tiller, abortion doctor.
- 2010
  - Intrust Bank Arena opens.
  - Population: 382,368.
- 2011 - Mike Pompeo becomes U.S. representative for Kansas's 4th congressional district.
- 2012 - Tornado outbreak of April 13–16, 2012.
- 2013
  - March: The Wichita State University Shockers men's basketball team makes its second run in school history to the Final Four.
  - December 13: Alleged 2013 Wichita bombing plot thwarted.
- 2015 - Jeff Longwell becomes mayor.
- 2018 - Mike Pompeo becomes United States Secretary of State; he remains in this position until 2021.
- 2020
  - Brandon Whipple becomes mayor.
  - Population: 397,532 at the 2020 United States Census

== See also ==
- History of Wichita, Kansas
- Timeline of Kansas
- Timeline of Topeka, Kansas

== Bibliography ==
- Wichita City Directory. 1878 – via Open Library.
- "Wichita", Kansas State Gazetteer and Business Directory, R. L. Polk & Co., 1904 – via Google Books
- Harland Bartholomew; et al. (1923). Comprehensive city plan for Wichita, Kansas. City Plan Commission – via HathiTrust. (fulltext)
- Federal Writers’ Project (1939). Kansas: a Guide to the Sunflower State. American Guide Series. New York: Viking Press – via HathiTrust.
- David J. Wishart, ed. (2004). "Cities and Towns: Wichita, Kansas". Encyclopedia of the Great Plains. University of Nebraska Press. ISBN 0-8032-4787-7.
