= The Legislative War of 1893 =

This is a photograph showing assistant sergeant at arms in the Kansas State House of Representatives in Topeka, Kansas, after peace was made between the Populists and Republicans at the conclusion of the Populist War.

The Legislative War of 1893 was an armed conflict that took place between the Populist Party and Republican Party in Topeka, Kansas, United States, at the Kansas State Capitol Building in 1893.

== Background ==
After the 1892 election, the Kansas Populist Party had just elected Lorenzo D. Lewelling as Governor and five additional congressional seats. The new legislature consisted of 65 Republicans, 58 Populists, and 2 Democrats. Populists in the Kansas House of Representatives accused Republicans of illegally electing 18 seats, and when the legislature convened in January, both parties claimed a majority. Both parties elected their own officers, including Speakers of the House, with Populists electing J. M. Dunsmore and Republicans electing George L. Douglas. For the next month, both parties conducted separate legislative sessions in the same hall. Governor Lewelling recognized the Populist House as the legal body, while the Populist-dominated Senate continued to meet as usual.

A photograph showing the House of Representatives door in the Kansas Capitol after it was broken by the Republicans during the Populist War, Topeka, Kansas.

On February 14, 1893, Ben Rich, clerk of the Populist House, was arrested by Republicans on charges of disturbing the peace of the legislature. Rich was rescued by fellow Populists, but the next day Populists responded by taking up arms and barricading the doors to the Representative Hall. Republican Speaker of the House George Douglass gathered a group of Republicans outside the Copeland Hotel, marched to the statehouse and smashed their way in with a sledgehammer. Populists retreated into the basement of the statehouse, and Governor Lewelling called on the state militia to restore order. Lewelling ordered Colonel J. W. F. Hughes to eject Republicans, but Hughes refused to obey an order he considered illegal. For refusing to obey orders, Lewelling had Hughes court-martialed, stripped of his rank, and dishonorably discharged.

== Aftermath ==
The conflict ended on February 17, 1893, when George Douglas reached an agreement with Governor Lewlling, resulting in a Populist surrender. Both parties continued to hold their respective legislative sessions until the Kansas Supreme Court ruled on February 25 that Republicans legally had control of the House. On February 27, the Populist House rejoined Republicans as the minority party in the Kansas House of Representatives.
