= Timeline of Topeka, Kansas =

The following is a timeline of the history of Topeka, Kansas, USA.

== 19th century ==
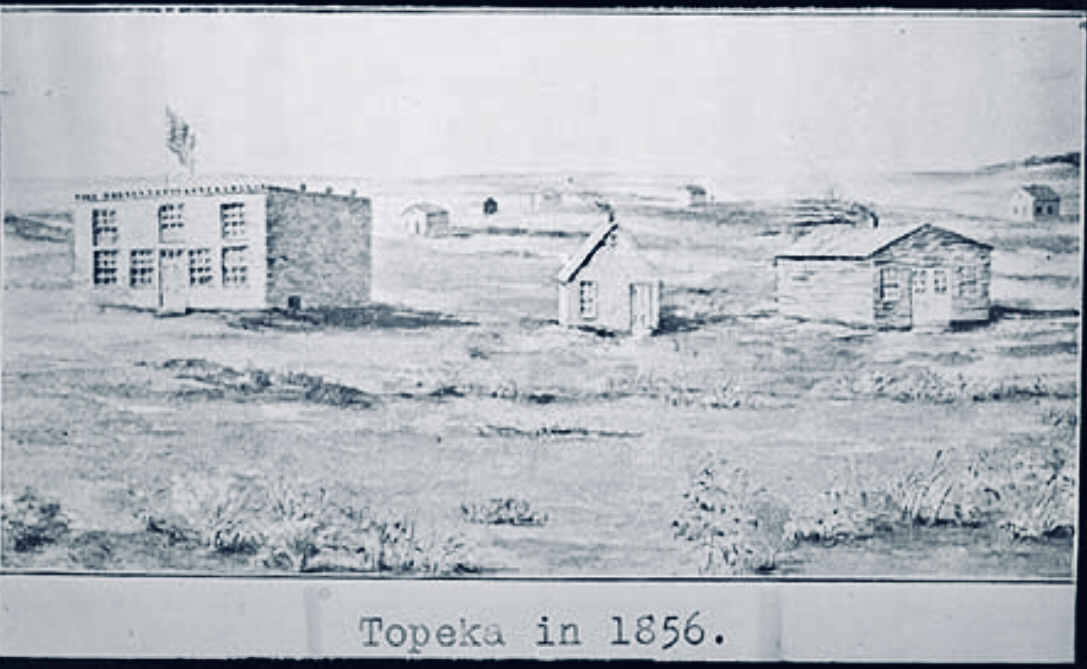
Topeka in 1856. Constitution Hall is on the left.

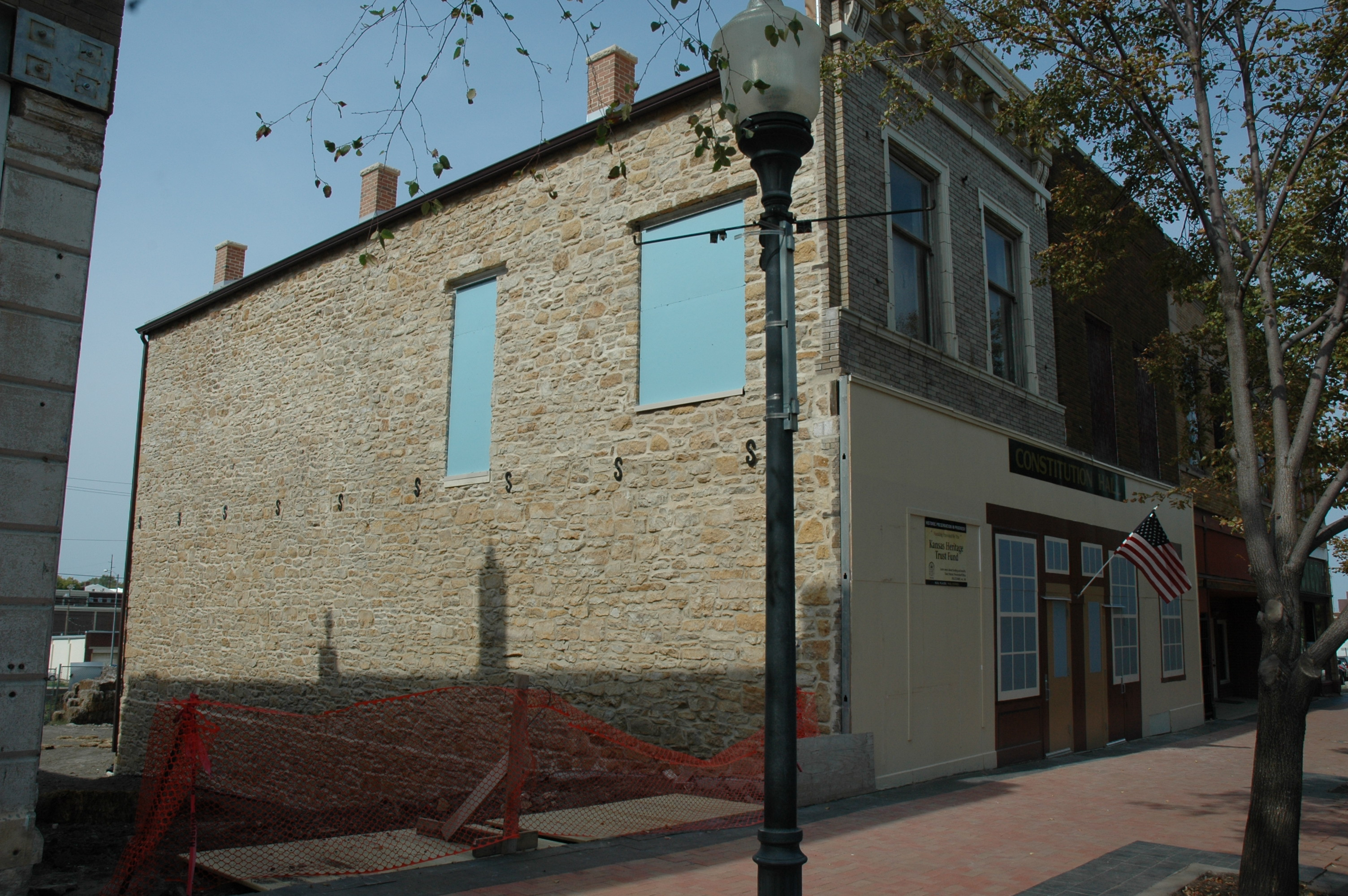
Constitution Hall, in Topeka, Kansas, shown here in 2012, is a significant building in the history of Kansas Territory and the state of Kansas. The two-story native stone building, with basement, was begun by Loring and John Farnsworth in the spring of 1855. By summer, the Topeka Town Association had agreed to complete the building in exchange for holding the Topeka Constitutional Convention there in the fall. From October 23 to November 11, 1855, the Topeka Constitutional Convention met in the building and produced the antislavery Topeka Constitution.

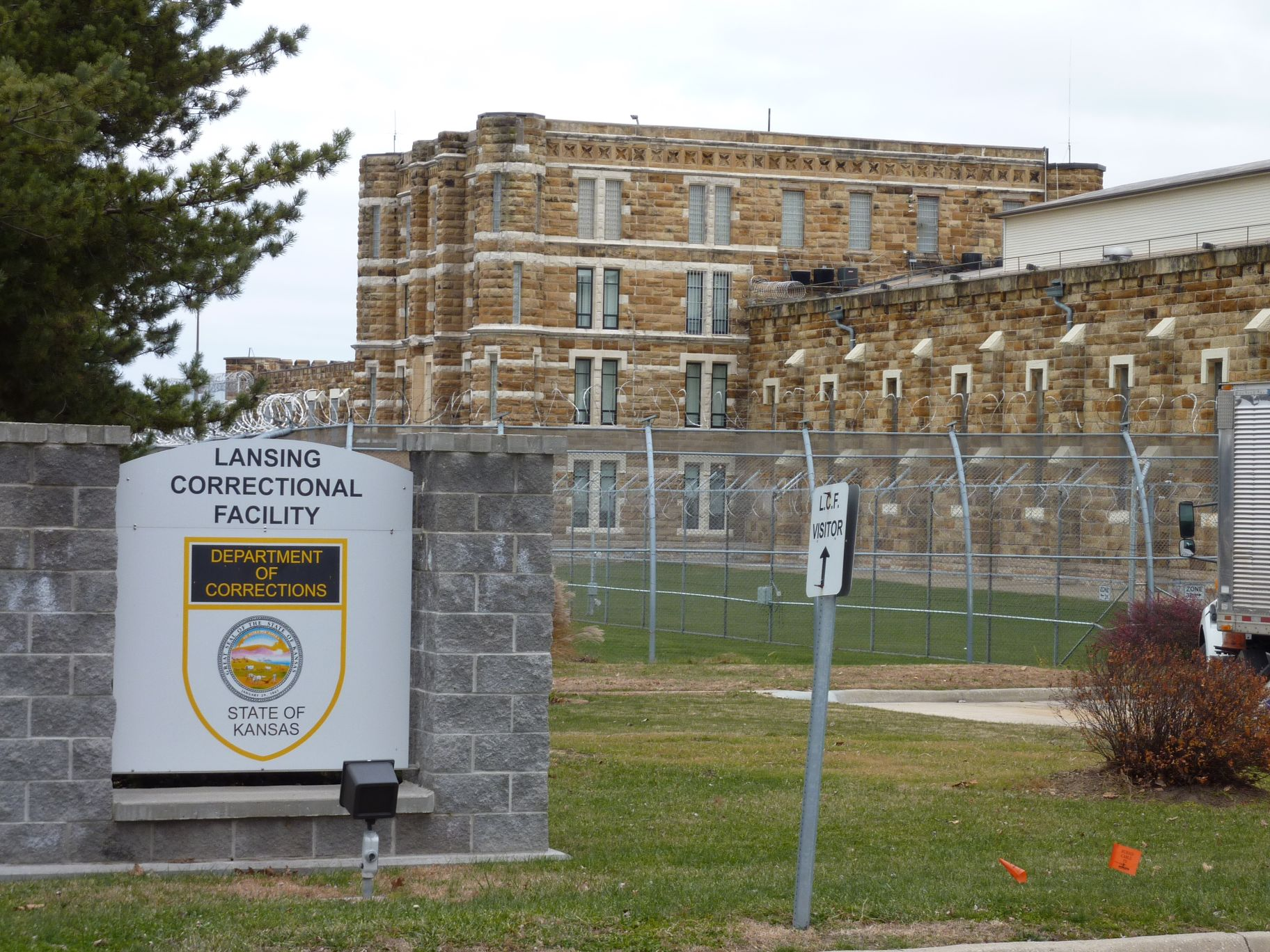
Lansing Correctional Facility

- 1854 - Topeka Association organized.
- 1855
  - Constitution Hall built.
  - Topeka Constitutional Convention held.
- 1856 - Free-state government installed in Topeka, March 1856.
- 1857
  - Topeka incorporated.
  - State Library of Kansas established.
- 1859
  - Kansas State Record newspaper begins publication.
  - Atchison, Topeka and Santa Fe Railway chartered and set up offices and work shops.
  - Wyandotte Constitution makes Topeka the temporary state capital.
  - Topeka Cemetery established.
- 1860
  - Grace Church incorporated.
  - Drought.
  - Population: 759.
- 1861
  - Wyandotte Constitution designates Topeka as state capitol.
  - Kansas legislature convenes.
  - Episcopal Female Seminary of Topeka chartered.
- 1863 - Kansas Farmer begins publication.
- 1864
  - Topeka threatened during Price's Raid.
  - Fort Simple built in the fall in to defend against Confederate troops during Price's Raid.
- 1865
  - Lincoln College founded.
  - Harrison School built.
  - Union Pacific railway begins operating in Eugene.
- 1867 - Fort Simple torn down in April.
- 1868 - Atchison, Topeka & Santa Fe railroad construction begins.
- 1870
  - Topeka & Shawnee County Public Library established.
  - Population: 5,790.
- 1871 - Topeka High School established.
- 1872 - Topeka State Hospital opens.
- 1873 - Kansas Academy of Science incorporated.
- 1875 - Kansas Historical Society founded.
- 1878 - Topeka Harvey House opens.
- 1879 - Daily Capital newspaper begins publication.
- 1880 - Population: 15,452.
- 1881 - Chartered as a city.
- 1883 - Public Library building constructed.
- 1886 - Population: 25,005.
- 1887
  - Governor's Mansion built.
  - Topeka Golden Giants baseball team formed.
- 1890 - Population: 31,007.
- 1894 - Christ's Hospital established.
- 1895 - Topeka Industrial and Educational Institute and Stormont Hospital and Training School established.
- 1897 - Topeka Tent and Awning Company established.
- 1899 - Gage Park established.

== 20th century ==
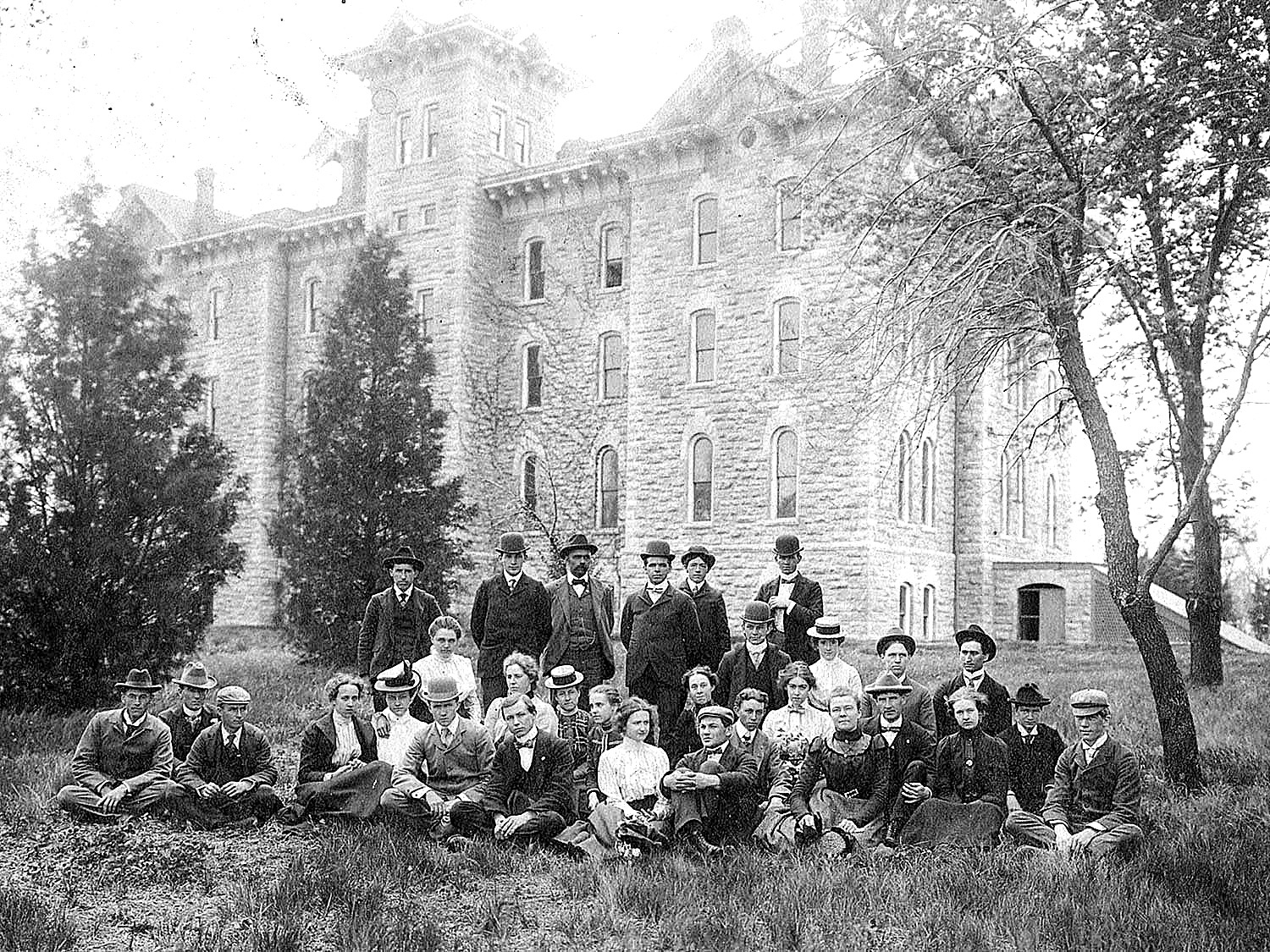
Class of 1900 in front of Rice Hall - Washburn University (WU) is a public university in Topeka, Kansas, United States. It offers undergraduate and graduate programs, as well as professional programs in law and business. Washburn has 550 faculty members, who teach more than 6,100 undergraduate students and nearly 800 graduate students. The university's assets include a $158 million endowment.

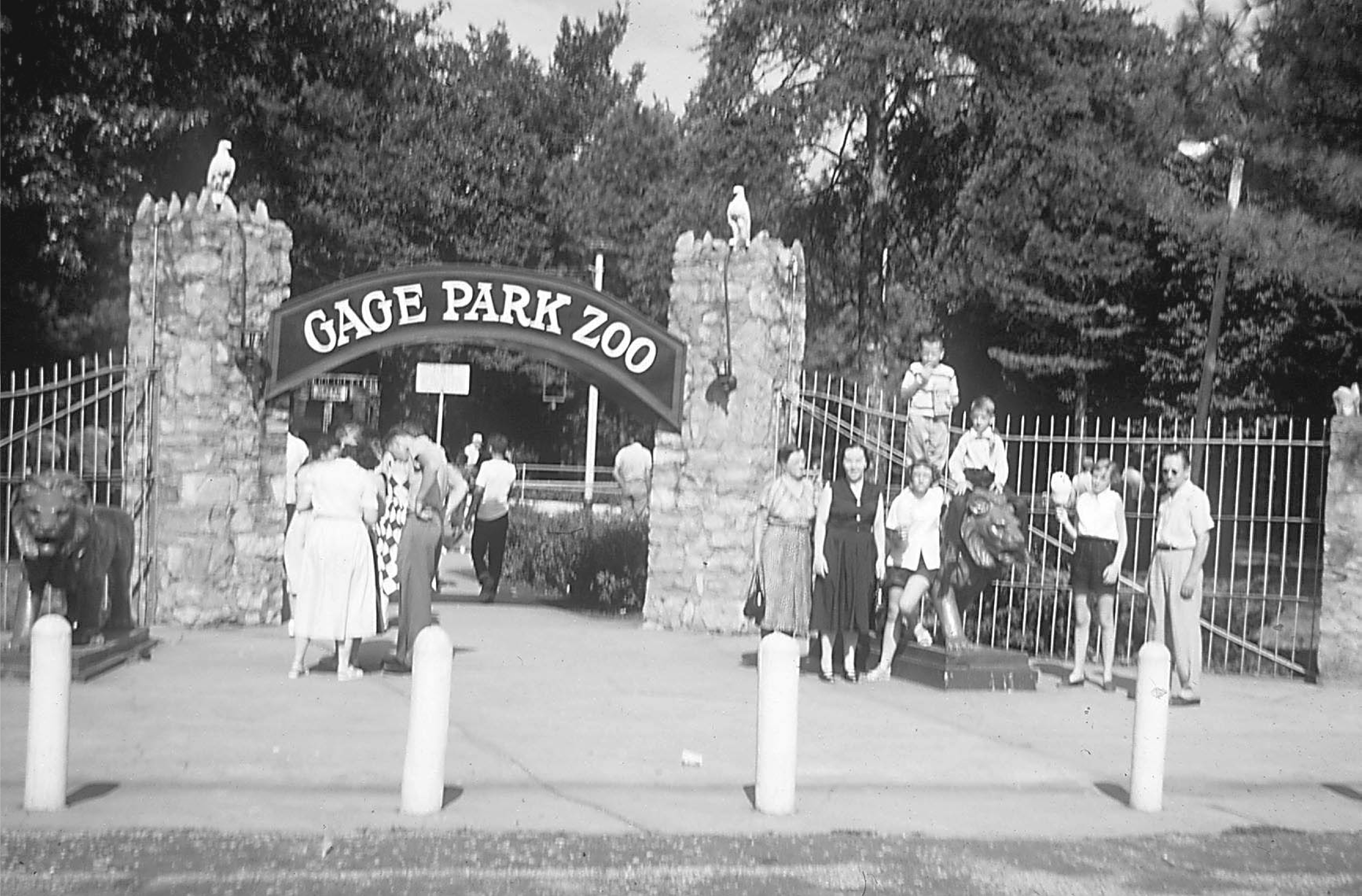
Entrance gate at the Topeka Zoo; originally known as The Gage Park Zoo

- 1900
  - Bethel Bible College founded.
  - Population: 33,608.
- 1902 - Smith Automobile Company founded.
- 1903 - Kansas State Capitol building constructed.
- 1905 - Topeka Industrial Institute later rebuilt as a women's prison.
- 1906 - Bethesda Hospital established.
- 1909 - St. Francis Hospital established.
- 1910 - Population: 43,684.
- 1911 - Hayden High School established.
- 1914 - GAR Memorial Hall built.
- 1917 - Grace Episcopal Cathedral built.
- 1920 - Menninger Clinic opens.
- 1926 - Jayhawk Theatre opens.
- 1928 - College of the Sisters of Bethany closed.
- 1933 - Topeka Zoo opens.
- 1936 - Sumner Elementary School built.
- 1941 - Topeka Army Air Field established.
- 1948 - Topeka station established.
- 1950
  - Population: 78,791.
  - Railroad station built.
- 1952 - Topeka Lutheran School opens.
- 1954 - Brown v. Board of Education decided.
- 1955 - Westboro Baptist Church opens.
- 1962 - Cedar Crest (mansion) becomes state governor's official residence.
- 1965 - Topeka Genealogical Society founded.
- 1966 - Tornado.
- 1976 - Forbes Field (airport) in operation.
- 1980 - Cair Paravel-Latin School founded.
- 1984 - Kansas Museum of History opens.
- 1987 - Sunflower State Expo arena opens.
- 1988 - West Ridge Mall opens.
- 1989 - Heartland Park Topeka motorsports facility opens.
- 1991 - Topeka Performing Arts Center opens.
- 1997 - City website online (approximate date).
- 1998 - Topeka ScareCrows ice hockey team founded.

== 21st century ==
=== 2000s ===
- 2003 - Kansas Koyotes football team formed.
- 2004
  - Brown v. Board of Education National Historic Site opens.
  - Topeka RoadRunners ice hockey team founded.
- 2005 - Bill Bunten becomes mayor.
- 2006 - Railroad station built.
- 2008 - North Topeka Arts District formed.
- 2009 - Topeka Mudcats women's football team founded.

=== 2010s ===
- 2010
  - Kaw River State Park opens.
  - Population: 127,473.

== See also ==
- List of mayors of Topeka
- National Register of Historic Places listings in Shawnee County, Kansas
- Timeline of Kansas

other cities in Kansas

- Timeline of Wichita, Kansas

== Bibliography ==
- Samuel Radges, ed. (1870), Biennial Directory of the City of Topeka, State Record Book and Job Printing House, hdl:2027/coo.31924007153608 – via HathiTrust
  - 1872
- Topeka City Directory, Topeka, Kans., Polk-Radges directory company, 1874 – via Internet Archive
- Biennial Directory to...the City of Topeka, Samuel Radges, 1880 – via Internet Archive
  - 1882
  - 1886
- F. W. Giles (1886), Thirty years in Topeka: a historical sketch, Topeka, Kansas: G. W. Crane & Co., OL 23347923M
- "Topeka" . Encyclopædia Britannica. Vol. 23 (9th ed.). 1888. p. 446.
- Mary E. Jackson (1890), Topeka Pen and Camera Sketches, Topeka, Kan: G. W. Crane & Co., printers, OCLC 2305406, OL 6586555M
- "Topeka". Kansas State Gazetteer and Business Directory. Chicago: R.L. Polk & Co. 1904 – via Google Books.
- James Levi King (1905), History of Shawnee County, Kansas, and representative citizens, Chicago, Ill: Richmond & Arnold, OL 14013262M
- "Topeka" . Encyclopædia Britannica. Vol. 27 (11th ed.). 1911. pp. 48–49.
- Topeka City Directory, Polk-Radges Directory Co., 1912, hdl:2027/umn.31951002300151j
  - 1921
- Pocket Guide to City of Topeka. Ed. G. Moore. 1913. hdl:2027/chi.69107413.
- Federal Writers’ Project (1939). "Topeka". Kansas: a Guide to the Sunflower State. American Guide Series. New York: Viking Press. hdl:2027/mdp.39015027812505 – via HathiTrust.
- Ory Mazar Nergal, ed. (1980), "Topeka, KS", Encyclopedia of American Cities, New York: E.P. Dutton, OL 4120668M
- David J. Wishart, ed. (2004). "Cities and Towns: Topeka, Kansas". Encyclopedia of the Great Plains. University of Nebraska Press. ISBN 0-8032-4787-7.
- Burgess, Barbara. "Topeka's Roots: the Prairie Potato".
- Andrews, B. (1995). Topeka: A City of Opportunity (Kansas State Historical Society).
- Cohen, J. (2007). The History of Topeka ( University of Kansas Press).
- Holmes, J. (2020). Topeka: A History (Arcadia Publishing).
- Johnson, C. (1987). A History of Topeka (Kansas State University Press).
- Johnson, W. (1982). Topeka: An Illustrated History. Kansas State Historical Society).
- Kappler, P. (2010). Topeka: The History of a Capital City (Kansas State Historical Society).
- Price, T. (2012). Topeka: The Story of Kansas’ Capital City (University Press of Kansas).
- Smith, M. (2005). Topeka: An Illustrated History (Kansas Historical Society).
- White, J. (2003). Topeka: A History (Kansas Heritage Press).
