= History of Wichita, Kansas =

The history of Wichita details the history of Wichita, Kansas from its initial settlement in the 1860s to the present day.

== Prehistory and exploration ==
The site at the confluence of the Arkansas and Little Arkansas Rivers has served as a trading center and meeting place for nomadic hunting people for at least 11,000 years. Human habitation in the Wichita area has been dated, in archeological digs, as far back as 3,000 B.C.

The area was visited by Francisco Vásquez de Coronado in 1541, while he was in search of the fabulous "cities of gold". While there, he encountered a group of Native Americans whom he called Quiviras and who have been identified by archaeological and historical studies as the Wichita. By 1719, these people had moved south to Oklahoma, where they met French traders.

The first permanent settlement in Wichita was a collection of grass houses inhabited by the Wichita tribe in 1864. They had moved back to Wichita from Oklahoma during the American Civil War because of their support for the Union.

== Pioneer cowtown ==
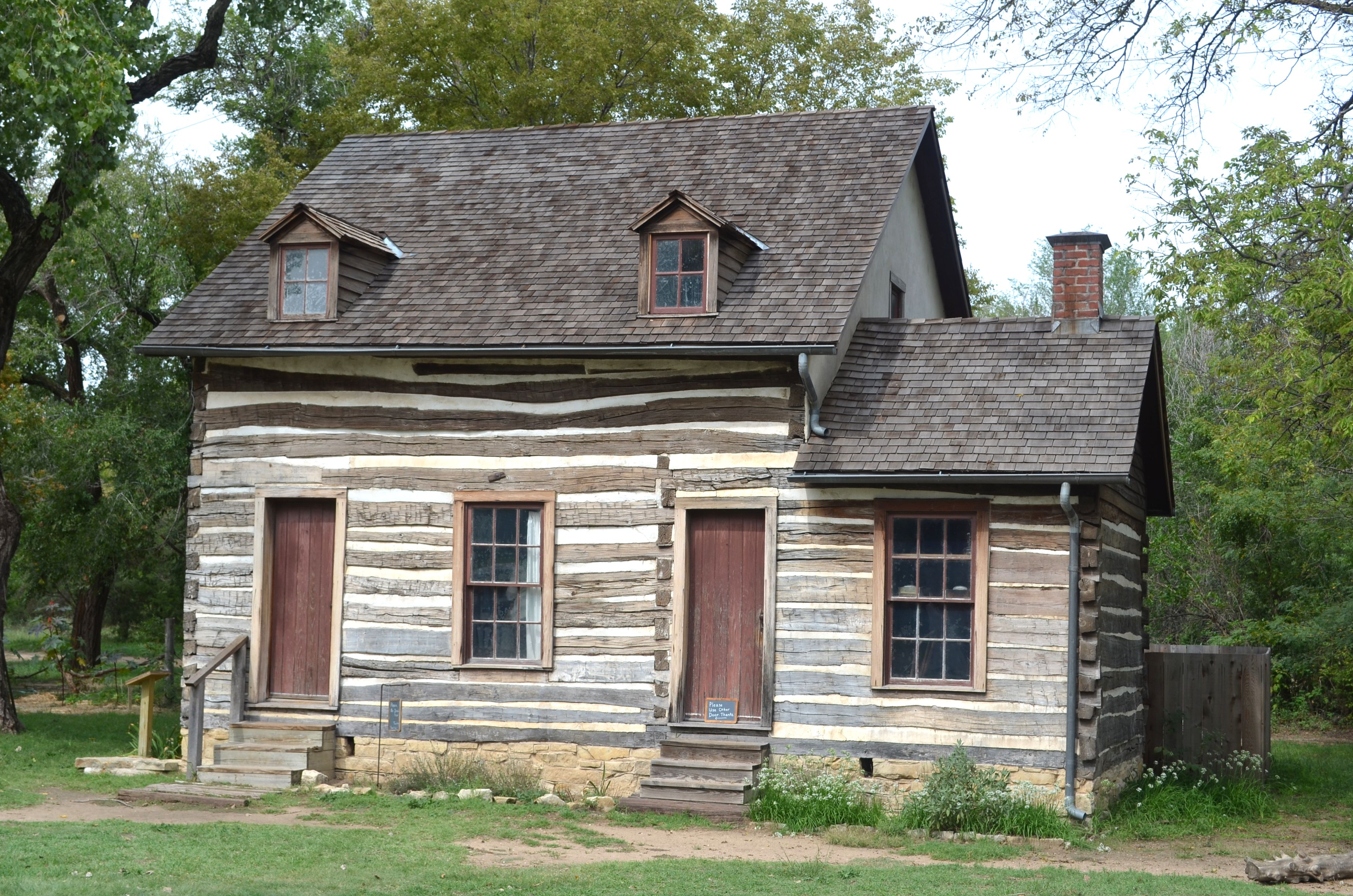
Darius Sales Munger House, built in 1868, is the oldest surviving building in Wichita.

Pioneer trader Jesse Chisholm, a half-white, half-Native American who was illiterate but who spoke multiple Native American languages, established a trading post at the site in the 1860s, and Chisholm traded cattle and goods with the Wichita tribe at points south along a trail from Wichita into present-day Oklahoma (and eventually into Texas) that became known as the Chisholm Trail, which soon became legendary in Western lore. Chisholm was soon eclipsed in the area by three astute businessmen: commercial buffalo hunters and traders James R. Mead (of Iowa), William Greiffenstein (a German immigrant merchant), and Buffalo Bill Mathewson (not to be confused with Buffalo Bill Cody); these men led the initial commercial development of the area, becoming key landowners of what became the city of Wichita.

Hunters, farmers and Native Americans in the area all turned to the newborn tiny settlement as a principal trading center for the area, while Wichita's entrepreneurs began an aggressive sales campaign to lure more settlers (their future customers and tenants) to the area, with the "boosterism" typical of successful early prairie settlements. The city, on the east bank of the Arkansas River, was officially incorporated in 1870. Among the signatories on the town charter was a lone woman, the town laundry operator, Catherine "The Widow" McCarty, whose elder teenage son, after leaving Wichita, would become the infamous gunman, Billy the Kid.

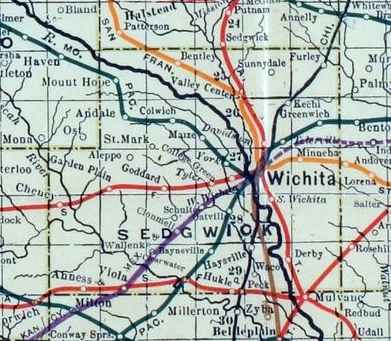
1915 railroad map of Sedgwick County

Wichita's position on the Chisholm Trail made it a destination for cattle drives headed north to access railroads to eastern markets. The Chisholm Trail ran along the east side of the community from 1867 to 1871. In late 1872 the Wichita and Southwestern Railroad completed a 27-mile branch line from Wichita to the Atchison, Topeka and Santa Fe Railway at Newton. As a result, Wichita became a railhead for cattle drives from Texas and other south-western points, from which it has derived its nickname "Cowtown." Wichita's neighboring town on the opposite (west) bank of the Arkansas River, Delano, a village of saloons and brothels, had a particular reputation for lawlessness, largely accommodating the rough, visiting cattlemen. The Wichita/Delano community gained a wild reputation, however, the east (Wichita) side of the river was kept more civil, thanks to numerous well-known lawmen who passed through, employed to help keep the rowdy cowboys in line. Among those was Wyatt Earp.

Following the incorporation of the city in 1870, rapid immigration resulted in a land boom involving speculation into the late 1880s. Wichita annexed Delano in 1880. By 1890, Wichita had become the third-largest city in the state (behind Kansas City and Topeka), with a population of nearly 24,000. After the boom the city suffered from 15 years of comparative depression and slow growth. The Wichita Eagle, which began publication in 1872, is the city's major daily newspaper. It was founded and edited for forty years by Marshall Murdock (1837-1908), a major player in local and state Republican politics, as well as doubling as postmaster.

Wichita reached national fame in 1900 when Woman's Christian Temperance Union (WCTU) member Carrie Nation decided to carry her crusade against alcohol to Wichita. On December 27 of that year she entered the Carey House bar in downtown Wichita and smashed the place with a rock and a pool ball. Although she had visited all the bars in Wichita the night before, demanding that they close their doors, the John Noble painting Cleopatra at the Roman Bath in the Carey House had drawn her particular wrath.

An island in the middle of the Arkansas River, named Ackerman Island, was home to an amusement park and a dance pavilion. The island was connected to the West Bank of the river through a Work Projects Administration (WPA) project in the 1930s.

== Oil boom ==
In 1914-1915 oil and gas were first discovered in nearby Butler County. These discoveries form part of the vast Mid-Continent oil province. Several local producers established headquarters, refineries, and retail outlets, in Wichita as it was the nearest large city.

Archibald L. Derby participated in oil booms in Southeast Kansas, Oklahoma, and in 1916 he drilled a successful well in Butler county. He went on to found Derby Oil Company that owned a refinery in Wichita at 21st and Washington Street. and had gas stations throughout the region. In 1955 Derby Oil was acquired by Colorado Oil & Gas, a subsidiary of Colorado Interstate Gas, which became part of Coastal Corporation in 1973.

John (Jack) Vickers (1891-1940) was another Wichita oil mogul who got his start in the Butler oil fields. Founder of Vickers Petroleum, in 1920, he built a refinery in Potwin Kansas about 20 miles northeast of Wichita. In 1934, at 8500 E Central, he built one of the largest mansions (named Vickridge) seen in Kansas up to that time. In 1961 the estate became the new site for the Kapaun Mt. Carmel High School.

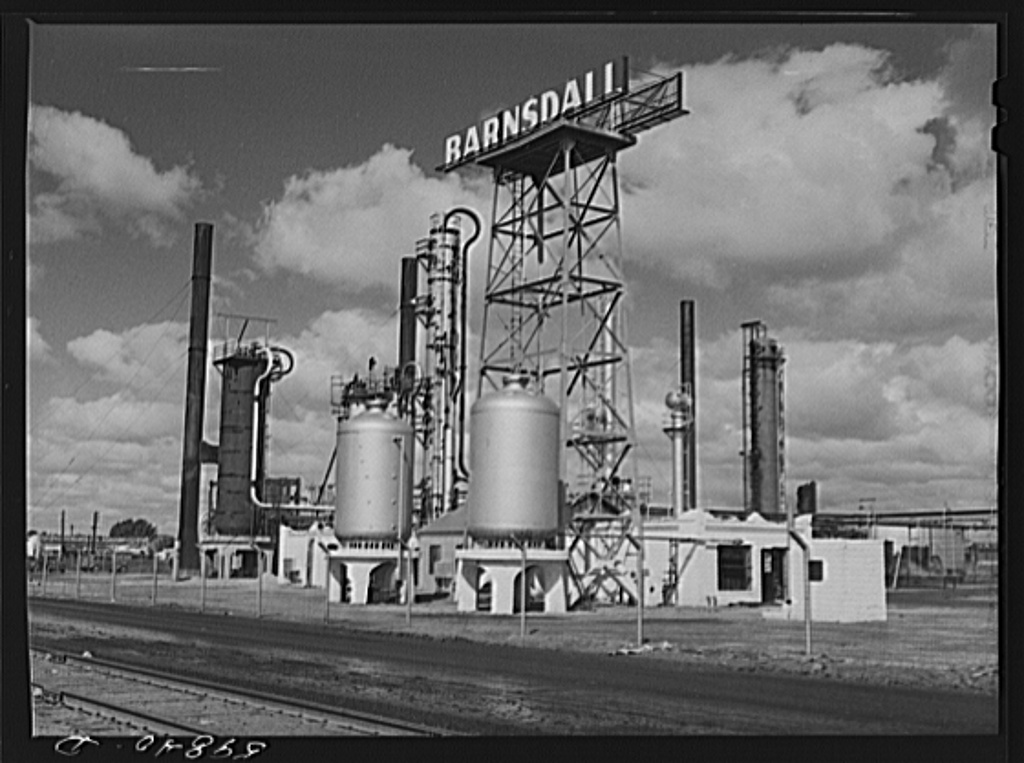
Barnsdall Refinery (1941)

By 1917 there were five refineries operating in Wichita. Seven more were built in the 1920s. But only three were still operating at the end of that decade. The Coastal-Derby refinery was the last to close in 1993 with none remaining thru 2010. It was demolished in 2004.

In 1925 Fred C. Koch, a chemical engineer, joined a fellow MIT classmate, P.C. Keith, at Keith-Winkler Engineering in Wichita. Following the departure of Keith in 1925, the firm became Winkler-Koch Engineering Company. In 1927, Koch developed a more efficient thermal cracking process for turning crude oil into gasoline which allowed smaller players in the industry to better compete with the oil majors. The larger oil companies quickly sued in response, filing 44 different lawsuits against Koch, and embroiling him in litigation for years. Koch was to prevail in all but one of the suits (which was later over-turned due to the fact that the judge had been bribed). This extended litigation effectively put Winkler-Koch out of business in the U.S. for several years. Koch turned his focus to foreign markets, including the Soviet Union, where Winkler-Koch built 15 cracking units between 1929 and 1932. Koch and his family would go on to become the wealthiest residents of both Wichita and the state of Kansas.

== "Air Capital of the World" ==
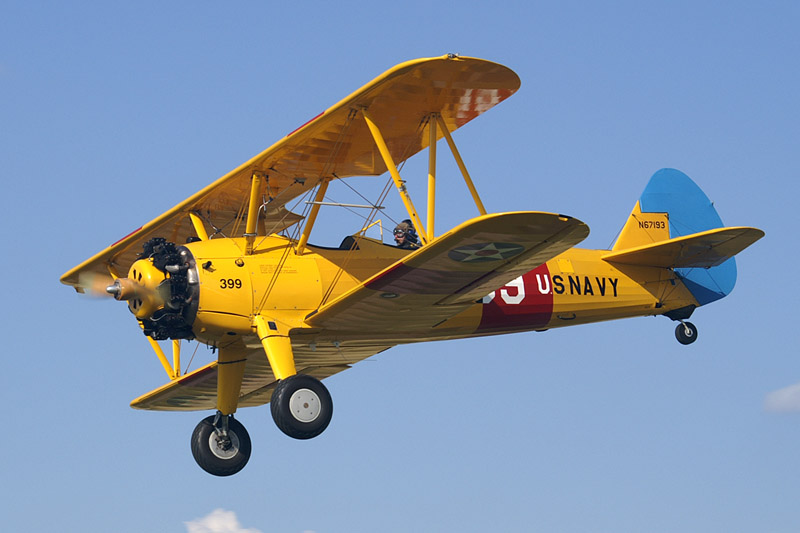
Over 10,000 Stearman (Boeing) Model 75 trainer aircraft were built during the 1930s and 1940s.

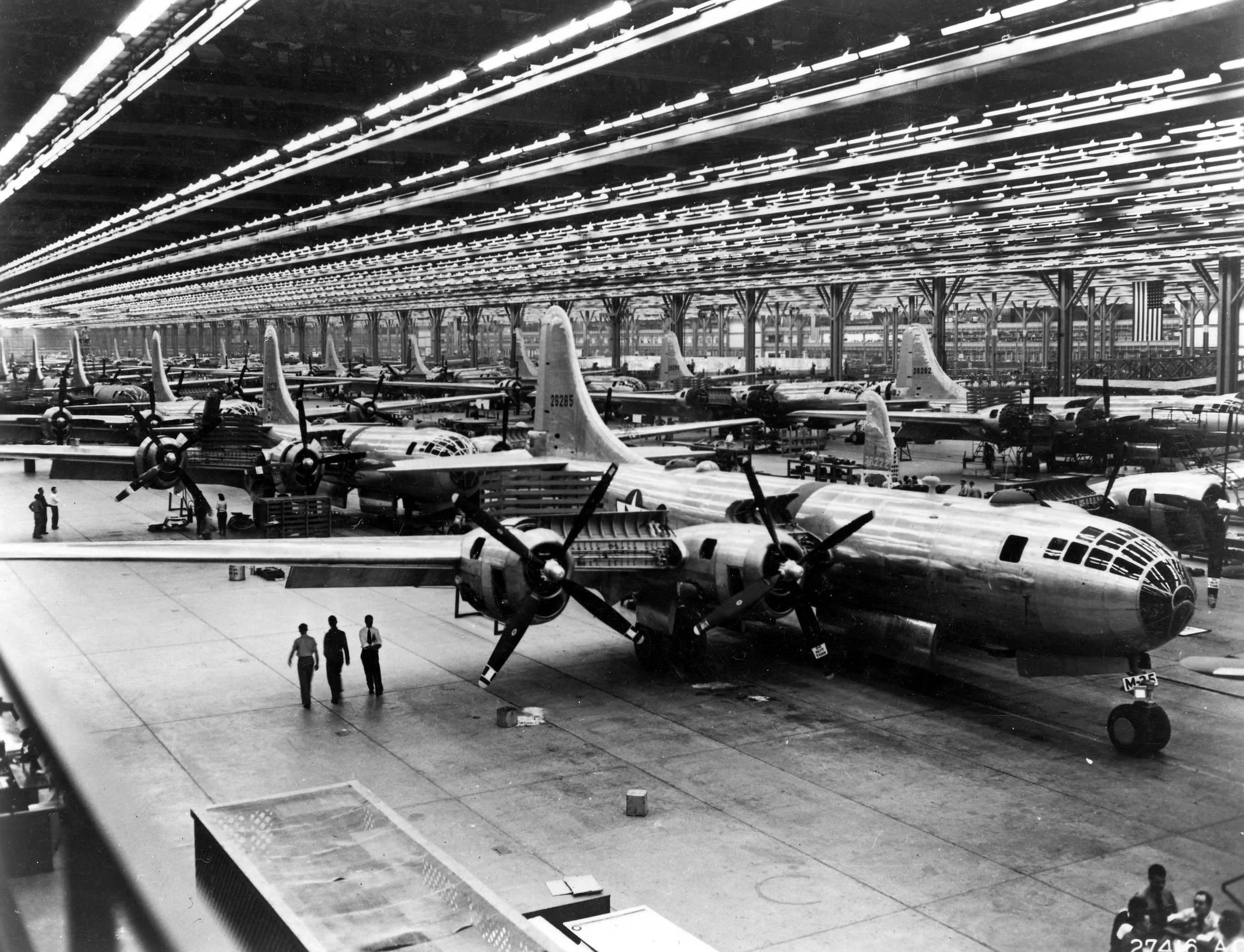
Boeing B-29 assembly line in 1944

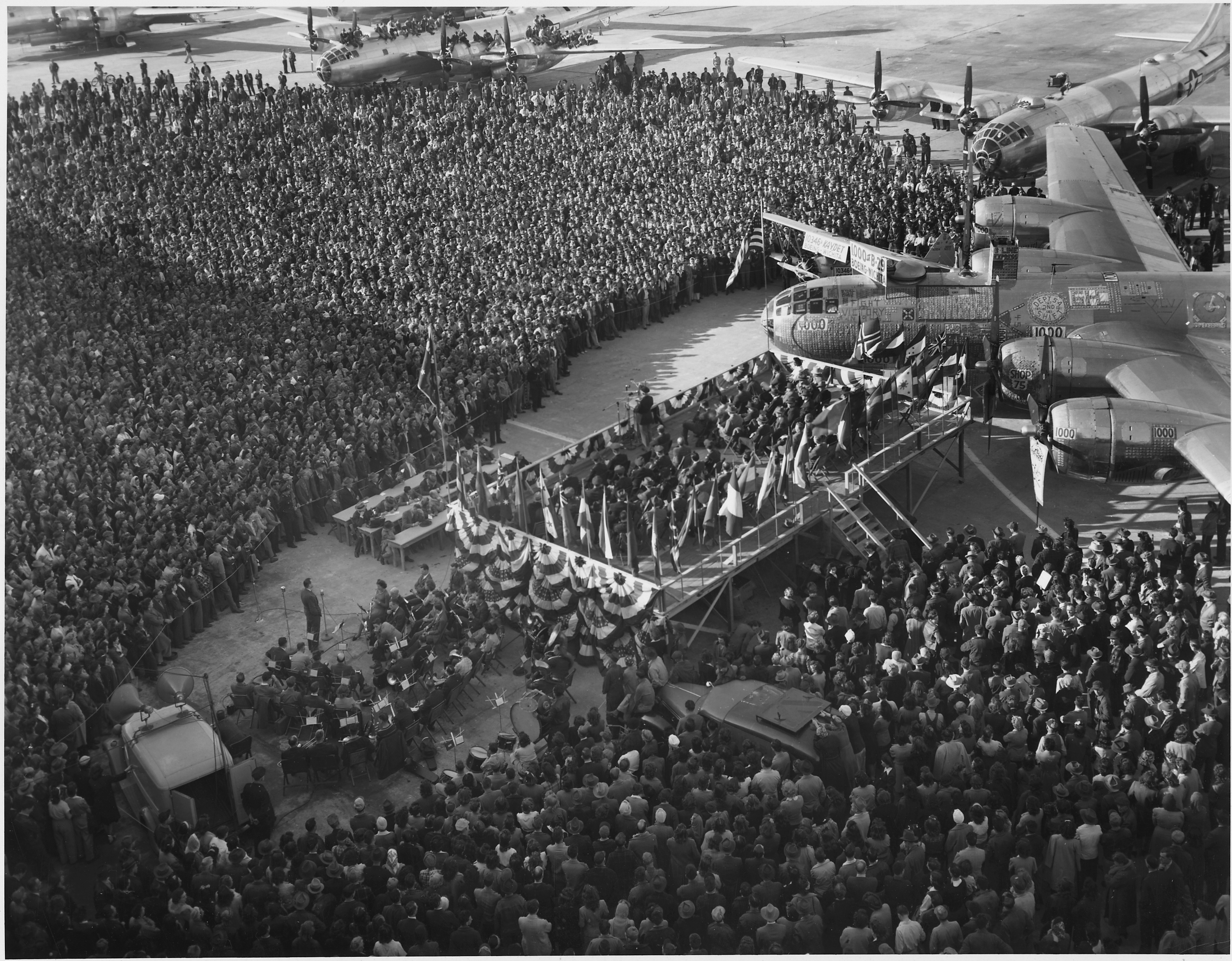
1000th B-29 Superfortress delivery ceremony at Boeing in February 1945

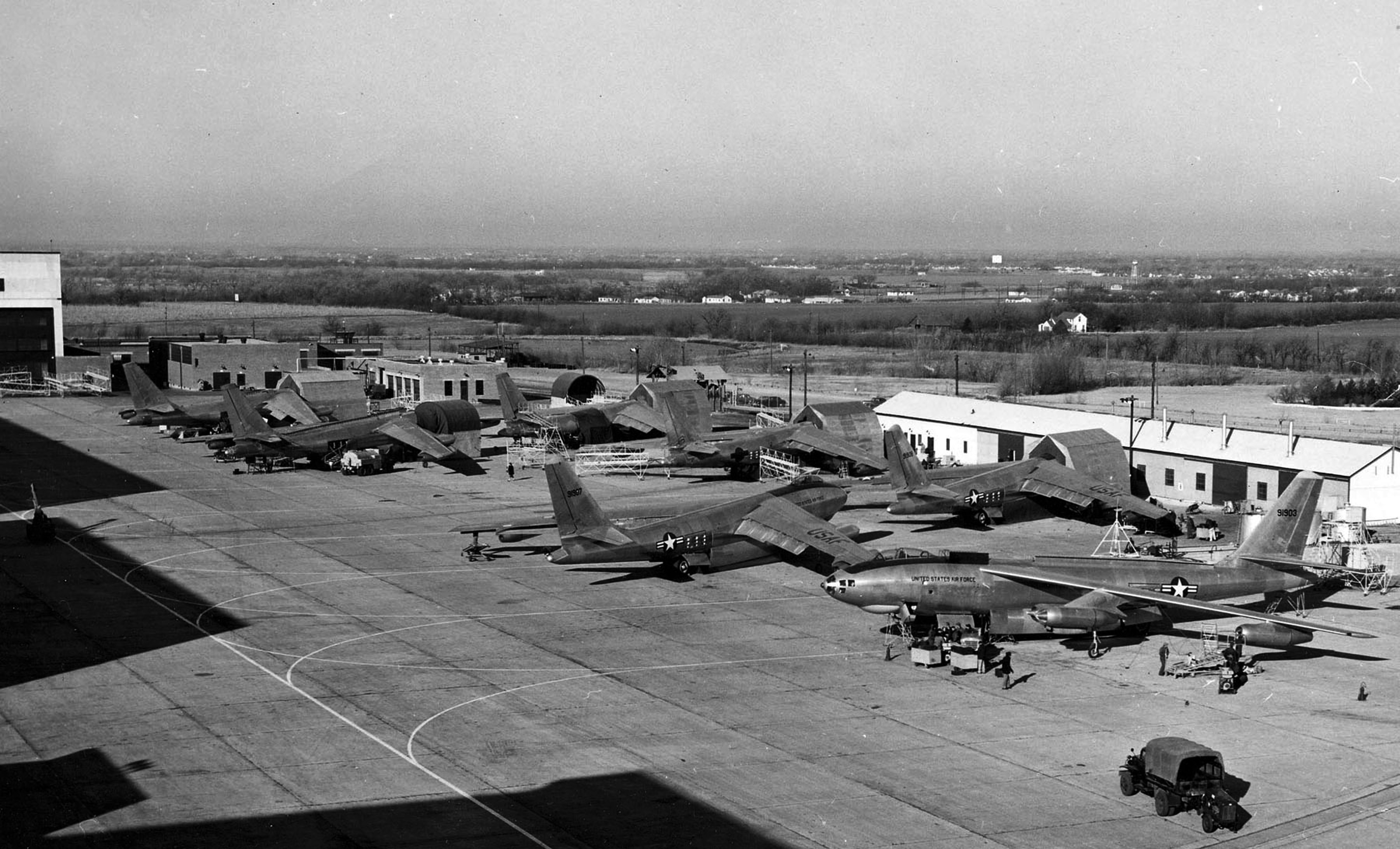
Seven B-47A Stratojet at Boeing plant in January 1951

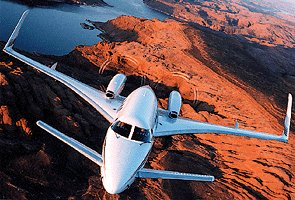
Beechcraft Starship were built from 1983 to 1995.

Wichita's principal industry is aircraft manufacturing, as it has been for several decades. The city claims the title "Air Capital of the World" based on having produced more aircraft than any other city, anywhere—an estimated over 250,000 aircraft in the last 100 years. The city produces approximately one-fifth of U.S. civilian aircraft, and has generally been the world leader in the production of light aircraft and business jets, in addition to substantial production of military and commercial aircraft, and their subassemblies, and related products.

In the 20th century, aviation pioneers such as Clyde Cessna and Walter Beech began projects that led to Wichita's establishment as the "Air Capital of the World". The aircraft manufacturers Laird, Swallow, Travel Air, Stearman, Cessna, Mooney, and Beechcraft were all founded in Wichita in the 1920s and early 1930s—leading to the city's rise to the nation's highest-volume producer of aircraft by 1929. Under those companies, and subsequently with added aircraft factories of Boeing, Learjet, Bombardier Aerospace, Raytheon, Culver, Belite, and others, Wichita eventually produced over a quarter-million aircraft, and aircraft manufacturing remains its principal industry today.

In 1914 and 1915, oil was discovered nearby and Wichita became a major oil center. The money derived from oil allowed local entrepreneurs to invest in a nascent airplane industry. In 1917 the Cessna Comet became the first aircraft to be built in Wichita.

In 1920, oilmen Jacob M. "Jake" Mollendick and Billy Burke invited young Chicago barnstormer and aircraft builder Emil Matthew "Matty" Laird to come to Wichita to build his new airplane design, backed by their money. The Laird Swallow became an instant success, the first successful "commercial" airplane manufactured in the United States; Laird built 43 of them between 1920 and 1923. When Matty Laird returned to Chicago, the Wichita enterprise was renamed Swallow Airplane Company. Lloyd Stearman and Walter Beech were both employees of the Swallow Company, but in January 1925 they left Swallow and teamed up with Clyde Cessna to form Travel Air, whose airplanes soon outsold Swallow's. Stearman left Travel Air in 1926 to start Stearman Aircraft in Venice, California, and Cessna quit in January 1927 to start Cessna Aircraft Company in Wichita. In 1927, Stearman relocated his factory back to Wichita. By 1929, at least a dozen more Wichita aircraft manufacturers arose (most producing small—even singular—quantities of aircraft).

In 1927, ground on the southeast side of town was purchased to use as the site for the Wichita Municipal Airport. However, the Great Depression interrupted construction. The terminal and runways were finished as WPA projects in the 1930s. In the 1940s the Municipal Airport site also hosted the Wichita Army Airfield and Boeing Airplane Company Plant No. 1. In the 1950s the military took full control of the site and named it McConnell Air Force Base. In 1954, civilian airline service moved to the new Wichita Mid-Continent Airport (now known as the Wichita Dwight D. Eisenhower National Airport) on the west side of town. Other airports in Wichita include the Colonel James Jabara Airport and Beech Field.

From 1927 to 1929, Travel Air, with Walter Beech at the helm, grew to over 600 employees and operated from a huge factory complex constructed a few miles outside the city. Due to so many employees working at such a large complex, it was dubbed "Travel Air City" by Wichita residents. The company merged with the huge Curtiss-Wright Corporation in the Roaring Twenties' heyday of company buyouts and takeovers just two months before the Stock Market crash in 1929. Workers were laid off by the hundreds during 1930 and 1931 and by the fall of 1932, the remaining Travel Air employees were let go, the equipment was sold, and the entire Travel Air plant sat empty.

By 1928, Wichita's varied aircraft industry was producing the highest volume of aircraft of any city in the United States (927 airplanes that year) and established Wichita as the nation's "Air Capital"—a title officially accorded to Wichita in 1929 (for 1928 production), by the American airplane manufacturers' national trade association, then known as the Aeronautical Chamber of Commerce.

Continuing to produce aircraft in exceptional quantities, until the present, Wichita has never relinquished the title, and eventually began claiming the title "Air Capital of the World", outproducing all other cities in the world in total aircraft production by the late 1960s.

In the late 1920s, Wichita University, under engineering professor Alexander N. Petroff, became only the third college in the nation to offer a degree in aeronautical engineering. By the end of the 1930s, the college had extensive facilities, including a wind tunnel. (The school, now Wichita State University, eventually expanded to offer master's and doctoral degrees in aeronautical engineering, and other related engineering disciplines. Its facilities expanded to include numerous engineering facilities, including multiple wind tunnels, and in recent decades a research alliance with the neighboring National Institute for Aviation Research (NIAR).)

In March 1932, Beech quit the Curtiss-Wright Corporation to form Beech Aircraft, along with his wife Olive Ann, and hired Ted Wells as his chief engineer. The first few "Beechcraft" were built in the vacant Cessna Aircraft plant, which had also closed during the depression; Beech later leased and then bought the Travel Air plant from Curtiss-Wright and moved his factory to this plant. Beech's first aircraft, the Model 17 (later dubbed the "Staggerwing"), was first flown on November 5, 1932. Nearly 100 Staggerwings are still in existence, many in flying condition. However, the aircraft that would propel the small company into a huge corporation was the Model 18 "Twin Beech", of which thousands were built from 1937 to 1969—the longest continuously produced aircraft in the world when production ended.

Staggerwing production ended in 1946, replaced by general aviation's first successful, fully modern light aircraft, the V-tailed, four-seat, single-engine Beechcraft Bonanza. Approximately 750 were built and sold in the first year, despite a recession and a devastating aviation industry shakeout. In various forms, the Bonanza has now become the world's longest continuously produced aircraft, still in production in a straight-tailed, six-seat version. Other models evolved from the Bonanza, ultimately culminating in the twin-turboprop Beechcraft King Air and Beechcraft Super King Air, the world's most popular turbine-powered business aircraft. The Beech line added imported business jets from Britain and Japan, a military trainer from Switzerland, and also produced military drones.

On February 8, 1980, Beech Aircraft Corporation was purchased by the Raytheon Corporation and later sold to Onex Corp., which renamed it Hawker Beechcraft. Major problems followed both takeovers, including troubled developments of the advanced business turboprop Beechcraft Starship and jets, and by late 2012 / early 2013 the company entered bankruptcy proceedings—emerging without its troubled business-jet line, as Beechcraft Corp., focused solely on its popular line of propeller-driven aircraft and military drones. In 2014, Cessna parent company Textron acquired Beechcraft and combined both Cessna and Beechcraft (including the Hawker brand) into a new division known as Textron Aviation.

After the 1929 stock market crash, Stearman and Boeing were acquired by United Aircraft and Transport Corporation (UATC). In 1934, antitrust action broke up UATC, and Boeing was spun off to house all UATC manufacturing subsidiaries west of the Mississippi river, including Wichita's Stearman. That same year, the Wichita plant began production of the successful Boeing-Stearman Model 75 "Kaydet" Navy and Army - Air Corps primary biplane trainer. After the crash of the Boeing XB-17 prototype in 1935, Wichita banker Arthur Kinkaid (IV National Bank of Wichita) supported Boeing and ensured that the Boeing-Stearman plant would remain in Wichita. By mid-2014, Boeing had wound down its Wichita operations and put its remaining facilities in the city up for sale.

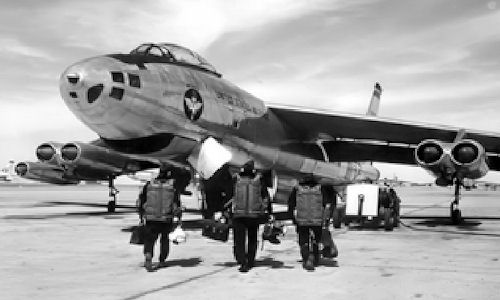
B-47A pilots training at Wichita's McConnell AFB in 1955. The bombers were built across the runway at Boeing.

The city experienced a population explosion during World War II when it became a major manufacturing center for the Boeing B-29 bombers needed in the war effort. By 1945, an average of 4.2 bombers were being produced daily in Wichita.

For several decades, Boeing was Wichita's (and Kansas') largest private-sector employer, and Boeing-Wichita was Boeing's largest factory complex outside Washington State, and one of the nation's largest factories of any kind.

Wichita saw some of its fastest population growth of the 20th century during the peak of the Cold War when Wichita was the headquarters for the Boeing Military Airplane Company and home to the McConnell Air Force Base. BoMAC produced all Boeing B-47 Stratojet aircraft and 63% of the Boeing B-52 Stratofortresses in Wichita.

At various times McConnell Air Force Base hosted the 3520th Combat Crew Training Wing (ATC) and 4347th Combat Crew Training Wing (SAC) B-47 training units, the 381st Strategic Missile Wing that controlled various LGM-25C Titan II missile silos around Wichita, the 388th Tactical Fighter Wing, 23d Tactical Fighter Wing, 91st Air Refueling Squadron, 384th Air Refueling Wing/Bombardment Wing, and the Kansas Air National Guard 184th Tactical Fighter Training Group. Wichita's mid-continental location made it ideal for basing strategic assets, allowing maximum time to react to a Soviet missile attack launched over the north pole or from oceangoing submarines.

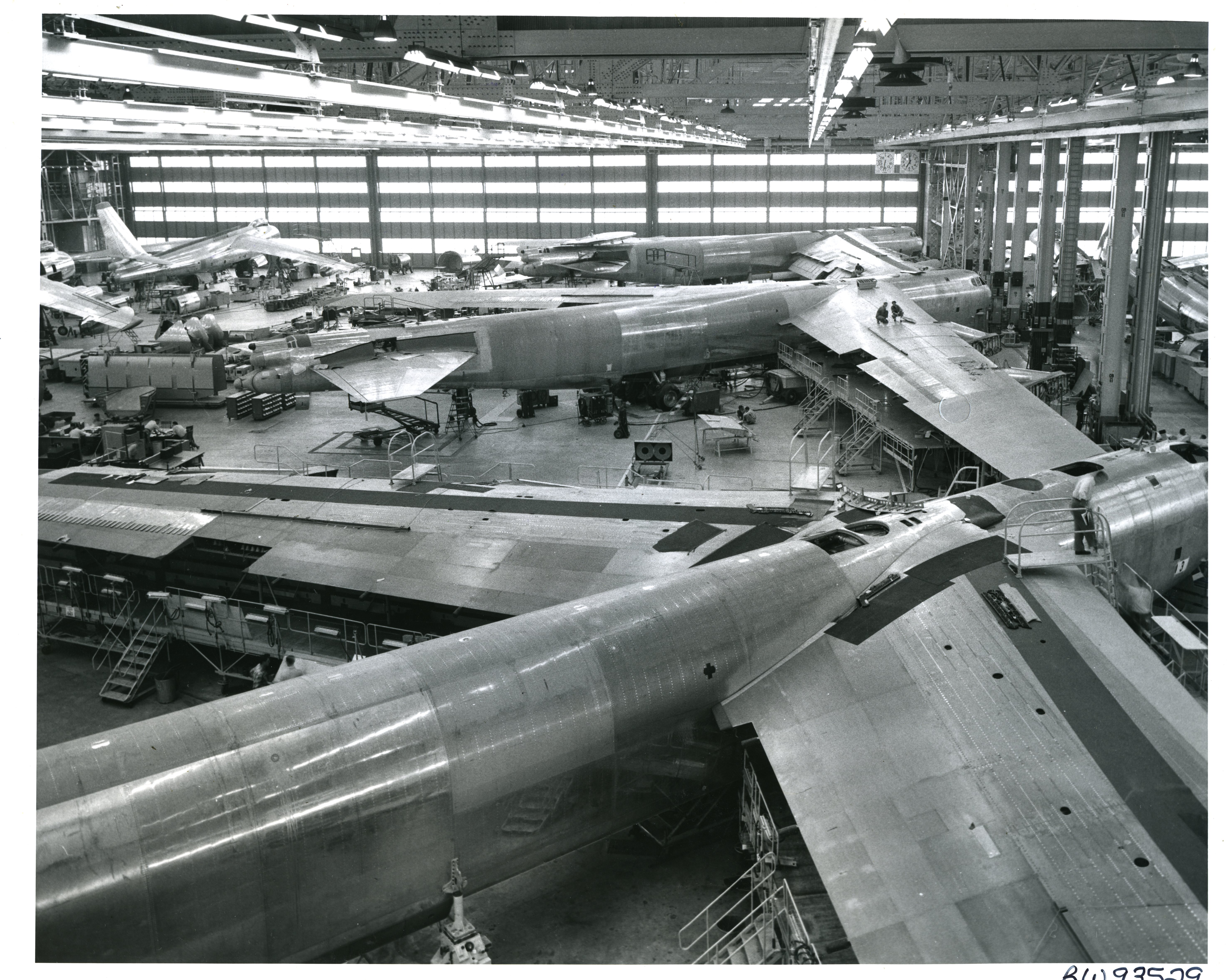
B-52D assembly Wichita BW-93529 (7251378576)

Several aircraft from McConnell AFB crashed in the city, including:

- On March 28, 1956 a Boeing B-47 Stratojet, 51-2175, of the 3520th FTW suffered an explosion in a bomb bay fuel tank and shed its wings over East Wichita crashing four miles (6 km) NE of the city, killing three crew.
- On January 16, 1965 a fuel-laden Boeing KC-135 Stratotanker (57-1442, c/n 17513) crashed after an engine failure shortly after takeoff from McConnell. It incinerated an area near the intersection of 20th and Piatt in north-central Wichita, killing 23 on the ground plus the 7 crew members; the largest non-natural disaster in Kansas history. The site of the crash was turned into Piatt Memorial Park. A monument was erected at the park in 2007.
- On March 5, 1974 a Boeing KC-135 Stratotanker (57-1500, of the 91st Air Refueling Squadron, 384th Air Refueling Wing) carrying 136,000 pounds of fuel crashed 3,000 feet from the main runway, after it apparently lost power. Two of the seven crew were killed.

In 1962, the Lear Jet Corporation was established when the Swiss American Aviation Corporation brought the tooling for building a failed ground-attack fighter to Wichita, with the objective of converting it to a business jet, and opened a plant at Wichita's airport. On February 7, 1963, assembly of the first Learjet aircraft began and the following year, the company was renamed the Lear Jet Corporation. The Lear Jet (later "Learjet") was an instant success, the nation's first "popular" business jet, selling over 100 units within two years, quickly becoming the global generic image of the business jet, and the popular icon of the glamorous, upper-class "jet-set" lifestyle—while establishing Wichita as a successful jet-aircraft design center. The company was acquired by a series of investors, particularly Gates Rubber Company which acquired the company in 1967, and renamed the enterprise Gates Learjet. Following three years of suspended aircraft production, the company was acquired in 1987 by a venture firm, Integrated Resources, which renamed the manufacturer Learjet Corporation, and resumed production. In 1990, the Canadian aircraft manufacturing firm Bombardier Aerospace purchased Learjet. By the end of 1999, Wichita had produced over 2,000 Learjets, and the factory was still producing aircraft as of mid-2017.

Development of the Lear Jet stimulated Wichita planemakers Cessna and, much later, Beechcraft, to get into selling business jets:

- Cessna launched its successful line of Citation business jets in 1970, with the Cessna Fan Jet 500, later renamed Cessna Citation I. Though small and slow, it was much safer, easier to fly, and less expensive to purchase and operate than the Learjet, and quickly gained prominence. Stretched versions followed, and eventually produced larger, faster business jets matching or exceeding Learjet performance and capacity. Today, Cessna business jets are the world's most popular, with over 3,000 flying.
- Beechcraft, too, sold business jets, but not successfully at first. Eventually, Beech acquired the Mitsubishi Diamond I design from Japan, and later acquired the Hawker Business Jets division of British Aerospace (producing the Hawker 700), modifying and selling those products successfully under "Beech" and "Hawker" brands.

In the 1970s, airplane designer/entrepreneur Jim Bede — an aeronautical engineering graduate of Wichita State University who had just developed the Bede BD-1 into the American Yankee in Cleveland, Ohio, leading to the popular Grumman-American light aircraft line — returned to the Wichita area to develop and market his Bede BD-5 micro-kitplane in nearby Newton, Kansas.

Bede's chief aeronautical engineer was Burt Rutan—who, in the 1980s (with his brother, test pilot Dick Rutan) helped Wichita's Beechcraft develop the world's first government-certified all-carbon-fiber composite airplane, the Beech Starship.

In the late 1980s two Boeing 747s were modified at Boeing-Wichita to become VC-25s to serve as Air Force One. at Boeing's military aircraft conversion center.

In August 1997, Boeing merged with McDonnell Douglas. The company relocated the headquarters of the BMAC division to McDonnell Douglas' St. Louis facility. In the 1990s, Boeing responded to conflict with labor unions by eventually selling off most of its commercial-aircraft subassembly factory, and its operations, to a newly created subcontractor, Spirit AeroSystems (initially largely owned by Boeing, itself), which continued the extensive Boeing jetliner manufacturing operations there—but without the financial burden of the original Boeing labor-union contracts. The facility continues as the supplier of major parts for all Boeing jetliners, including the front end of all Boeing jetliners, and 75% of Boeing's most popular plane, the Boeing 737, including the entire fuselage of that plane, which is shipped by rail to Seattle for final assembly. Other subassemblies for other Boeing aircraft (particularly engine nacelles), are built by Spirit at the Wichita factory.

In the early 21st century, Wichita aircraft manufacturing saw a return to its roots with the development of a small aircraft-manufacturing enterprise, Belite Aircraft Corp., at a local private airstrip (the Wichita Glider Port, northeast of town). Belite's initial product was the relabeled single-seat version of the popular SkyStar Kitfox, a metal-framed and fabric-skinned light sport aircraft.

However, at the start of the century, Boeing-Wichita remained the city's (and the state's) largest single private-sector employer, with about 12,000 workers. The factory built Boeing jetliner subassemblies (including whole fuselages of Boeing's most popular plane, the 737, and nose sections of all other Boeing planes). Labor unrest, however, created friction.

A declining economy, followed by the 9/11 terrorist-hijacked airliner attacks, and subsequent war, drove the aviation industry into a depression, and Wichita was among the cities hardest hit. Of the 48,000 Wichita aircraft workers employed in 2000, nearly a quarter—11,000—were laid off within the following two years, with several thousand more scheduled for layoff or furlough.

In 2004, following a contentious workers' strike, and claiming economic necessity, Boeing announced it would sell off its commercial aircraft manufacturing operations in Wichita—the bulk of its operations there. In 2005, the factory continued to operate, same as before, but under "Spirit AeroSystems"—an entity Boeing created with Toronto-based Onex Corporation—technically a separate entity from Boeing, allowing Boeing to discard its Wichita union contracts and obligations, and force factory workers' wages back down. Eventually, Boeing sold its stake in Spirit, but Spirit retains its role as Boeing's largest subcontractor—while also branching out to support other manufacturers (particularly Boeing's chief rival, Airbus) at factories elsewhere, particularly in Oklahoma. In 2006, Spirit became a publicly traded company, and in 2014 Onex announced it was selling off its remaining stock.

Boeing retained ownership of much of the original Boeing-Wichita complex, however, and continued to operate its dwindling Military Division facilities there, with around 2,000 workers, chiefly performing aircraft modifications. Angling for an Air Force contract to replace its own, aging KC-135 aerial tankers, Boeing promised Wichita thousands of related jobs, if Wichita leaders would pressure Congress and the federal government to give Boeing the contract. Though Wichita leaders complied, and Boeing won the contract, Boeing then promptly announced it would close its remaining Boeing-Wichita facilities, and leave the city permanently by late 2013—ending an 85-year presence in the city—a stunning shock to the city.

However, Wichita remains a major manufacturing center for the aircraft industry today, with Textron (Cessna, Beechcraft and Textron Aviation) and Bombardier (Learjet) having major manufacturing centers in town, as well as design and engineering facilities run by Airbus, the international Bombardier Flight Test Center, numerous aerospace subcontractors and parts manufacturers, and several aerospace technology training centers, schools and research facilities.

== Entrepreneurial hub ==
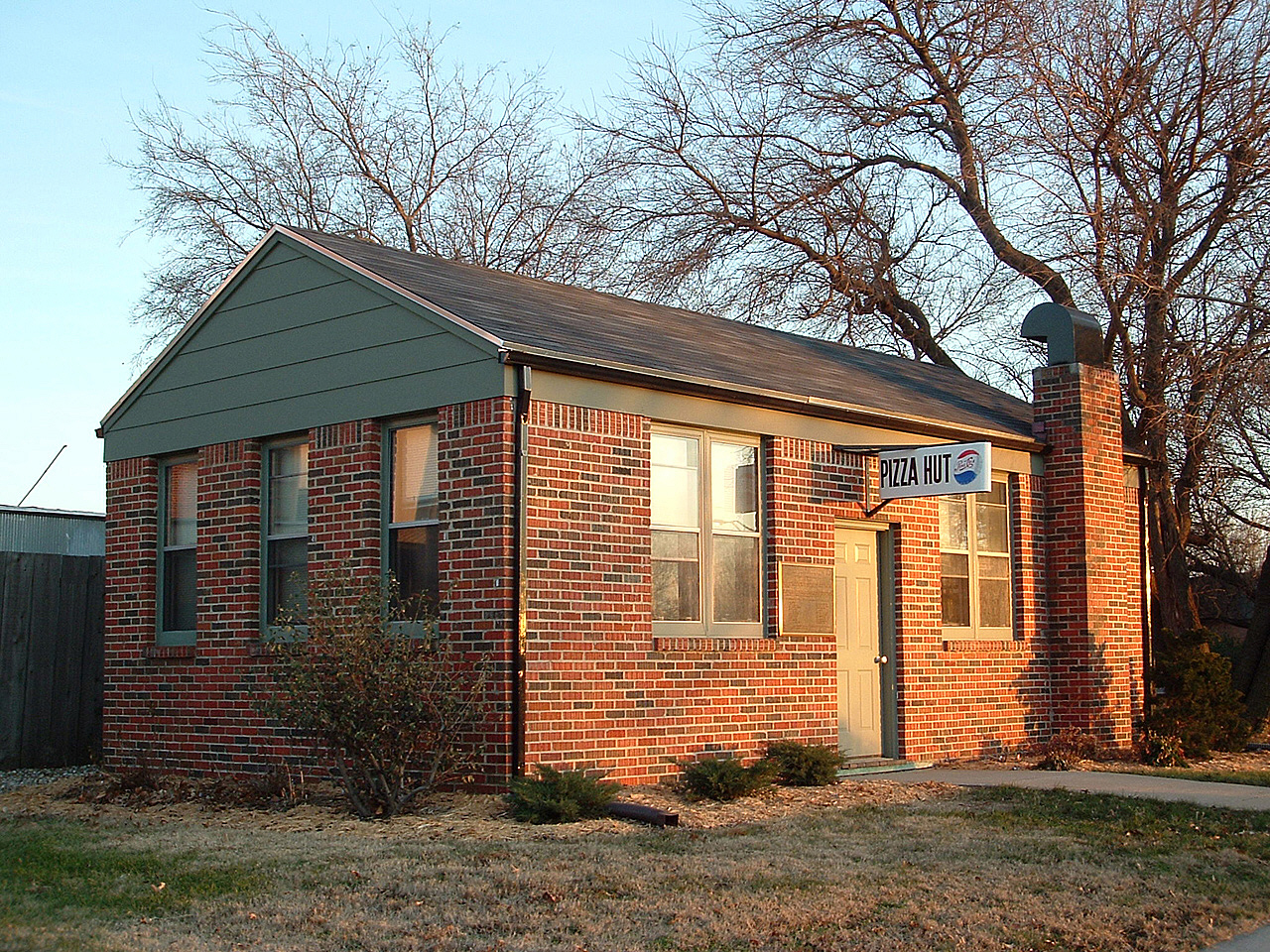
The original Pizza Hut building, which was moved to the campus of Wichita State University

Wichita was also a significant entrepreneurial business center during the pre- and post-war period, with the Garvey Organization, Koch Industries, Coleman, Mentholatum, White Castle, Pizza Hut, Taco Tico, Freddy's Frozen Custard & Steakburgers, and having all been founded in Wichita. (Ironically, White Castle closed all of their restaurants in Wichita in 1938 and has not operated in the state of Kansas after a failed revival attempt in the Kansas City area in the early 1990s.) The entrepreneurial spirit of Wichita led to the creation of one of the first academic centers to study and support entrepreneurship at the Wichita State University Center for Entrepreneurship.

Davis Manufacturing invented and mass-produced a popular trenching machine in the 1960s—the Ditch Witch—and was later acquired by J. I. Case, who gradually turned the factory towards producing the company's skid-steer loaders—which it does today for Case's parent company, Case New Holland(CNH), under both "Case" and "New Holland" names.

Another large Wichita industrial facility, Chance Manufacturing became a national leader in amusement park rides, including ferris wheels, and remains active today. Chance has also manufactured trolley-styled busses and miniature trains. In addition to Chance's vehicles, Wichita has been home to Big Dog Motorcycles.

In October 1932, orchestra leader Gage Brewer introduced the electric guitar to the world from Wichita using an instrument developed by what would later become known as the Rickenbacker Guitar Company.

Recent history has seen increased development in downtown and to the east and west sides of Wichita. In June 2005, Sedgwick County voters approved a sales tax raise to build a new arena downtown to replace the aging Kansas Coliseum, located north of the city. This is considered by some as a stepping stone to launch new development downtown.

== Segregation ==
The Dockum Drug Store sit-in, in Wichita, was one of the first organized lunch-counter sit-ins for the purpose of integrating segregated establishments in the United States. The protest began in July 1958; the Dockum Drug Store, part of the old Rexall chain, refused to serve African Americans at its lunch counter. Protesters occupied all the seats at the counter, effectively shutting it down. Some days they sat at the counter all day, until the store closed. There were taunts from white counterprotesters.

The sit-in ended three weeks later when the owner relented and agreed to serve black patrons, 18 months before the better-publicized Greensboro sit-ins in January 1960. A 20-foot (6.1 m)-long bronze sculpture, first announced in 1998 at a cost of $3 million, marks the site of the successful sit-in, with a lunch counter and patrons depicting the protest.

== Infamous crimes ==
From 1974 to 1991 serial killer Dennis Rader murdered 10 victims in and around the Wichita area. Until his identity was finally discovered by police, he was known as the "BTK killer". Rader was particularly known for sending taunting letters to police and the media. In 2005 a letter that Rader sent on a floppy disc included meta-data that led police to identify and arrest him.

Wichita became the scene of a robbery and mass murder in 2000. Brothers Jonathan and Reginald Carr robbed, raped, and killed five people.

In August 1976, Michael Soles, an unemployed welder from Sand Springs, Oklahoma, set up a sniper position on the roof of the Holiday Inn Plaza, then the tallest building in downtown Wichita. Over the course of an eleven-minute shooting spree, he killed three people and wounded six. The gunman was wounded by police and taken into custody.

== See also ==
- Timeline of Wichita, Kansas
