= Blériot 53 =

General information
- Type: Twin-engined reconnaissance aircraft
- National origin: France
- Manufacturer: Recherches Aéronautique Louis Blériot
- Designer: Louis Blériot
- Number built: 1

History
- First flight: 1915
- Developed into: Blériot four-engined bomber

The Blériot 53 was a twin-engined reconnaissance biplane designed and built in France during 1915, (There is some doubt that the aircraft was actually given the designation Blériot 53). The Fuselage was partly covered with fabric leaving most of the rear fuselage un-covered, all-flying tailplane and rudder at the rear extremities, with a tail-skid underneath. To accommodate the nose down attitude when fully loaded, due to the centre of gravity coinciding with the mainwheels, there was a long skid extending from the forward fuselage. Two 80 hp (60 kW) Le Rhône 9C rotary engines were mounted on struts between the wings with fuel and oil tanks in the nacelles behind them. Trials were also believed to have been carried out with 100 hp (75 kW) Anzani 10 radial engines.

It formed the basis of a four-engined bomber flown in 1916.

== Specifications (variant specified) ==
Data from French aircraft of the First World War

General characteristics

- Crew: 2
- Length: 9 m (29 ft 6 in)
- Wingspan: 13.5 m (44 ft 3 in)
- Wing area: 27 m^{2} (290 sq ft)
- Powerplant: 2 × Le Rhône 9C 9-cylinder air-cooled rotary piston engines, 60 kW (80 hp) each
- Propellers: 2-bladed fixed pitch propellers

Performance

- Maximum speed: 95 km/h (59 mph, 51 kn)
