= CW 6 =

CW 6 may refer to:

== U.S. television stations affiliated with The CW ==
=== Current affiliates ===
- WSTM-DT2 in Syracuse, New York, United States (cable channel; broadcasts on channel 3.2)
- KECY-DT3 in Yuma, Arizona, United States

=== Former affiliates ===
- KASW in Phoenix, Arizona, United States (cable channel, broadcasting on channel 61; 2006–2018)
- WXCW in Naples, Florida, United States (cable channel, broadcasting on channel 46; 2006–2014)
- XETV-TDT in Tijuana, Baja California, Mexico (2008–2017)

== In aircraft ==
- Cessna CW-6, a 1920s American six-seat touring aircraft
- Curtiss-Wright CW-6, a late 1920s American six-seat utility aircraft

== In other uses ==
- CW6, a postcode district in the CW postcode area in Cheshire, England
