= Blériot four-engined bomber =

French WW1 bomber aircraft

General information
- Type: Four-engined bomber
- National origin: France
- Manufacturer: Recherches Aéronautique Louis Blériot
- Designer: Louis Blériot
- Number built: 1

History
- First flight: 1915 or 1916
- Developed from: Blériot 53

The Blériot four-engined bomber was a four-engined biplane designed and built in France during 1915. The four-engined bomber of 1915 was an enlarged version of the Blériot 53 with four bay wings and four 120 hp (89 kW) Anzani 10A4 radial engines mounted on struts between the wings with fuel and oil tanks in the nacelles behind them.

It was the first multi-engine Blériot design, and flew from Buc during 1916.
