= Cessna CW-6 =

1920s American touring aircraft

Model CW-6
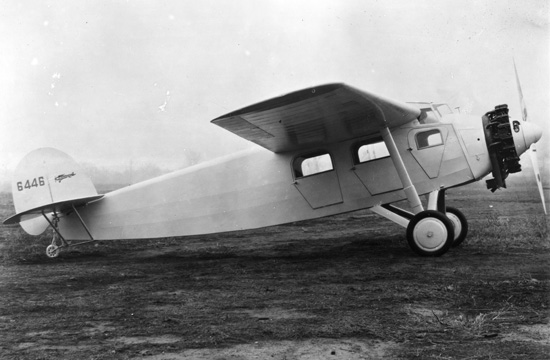

General information
- Type: Six-seat tourer
- Manufacturer: Cessna Aircraft Company
- Designer: Clyde Cessna

History
- First flight: November 1928
- Variants: Cessna DC-6

The Cessna Model CW-6 was a 1920s American six-seat touring aircraft built by the Cessna Aircraft Company.

== Design and development ==
Following development of the four-seat Model A the company designed a six-seat aircraft, the Model CW-6. The aircraft first flew in November 1928, powered by a 220 hp (164 kW) Wright Whirlwind J-5 radial engine. The aircraft was displayed at the 1929 Auto Show in Wichita, Kansas. A scaled-down four-seat version, the Cessna DC-6, was also developed.

== Specifications (CW-6) ==
Data from Manufacturers Specifications on American Commercial Airplanes as Compiled by Aviation

General characteristics

- Crew: 1
- Capacity: 5 passengers
- Length: 29 ft 4 in (8.94 m)
- Wingspan: 43 ft 4 in (13.21 m)
- Height: 8 ft 2 in (2.49 m)
- Wing area: 296 sq ft (27.5 m^{2})
- Empty weight: 2,175 lb (987 kg)
- Gross weight: 3,950 lb (1,792 kg)
- Fuel capacity: 80 US gal (67 imp gal; 300 L)
- Powerplant: 1 × Wright J-6 Whirlwind radial engine, 300 hp (220 kW)

Performance

- Maximum speed: 148 mph (238 km/h, 129 kn)
- Cruise speed: 120 mph (190 km/h, 100 kn)
- Range: 610 mi (980 km, 530 nmi)
- Service ceiling: 17,500 ft (5,300 m)
- Rate of climb: 900 ft/min (4.6 m/s)
