= British Deperdussin Seagull =

British seaplane

Seagull
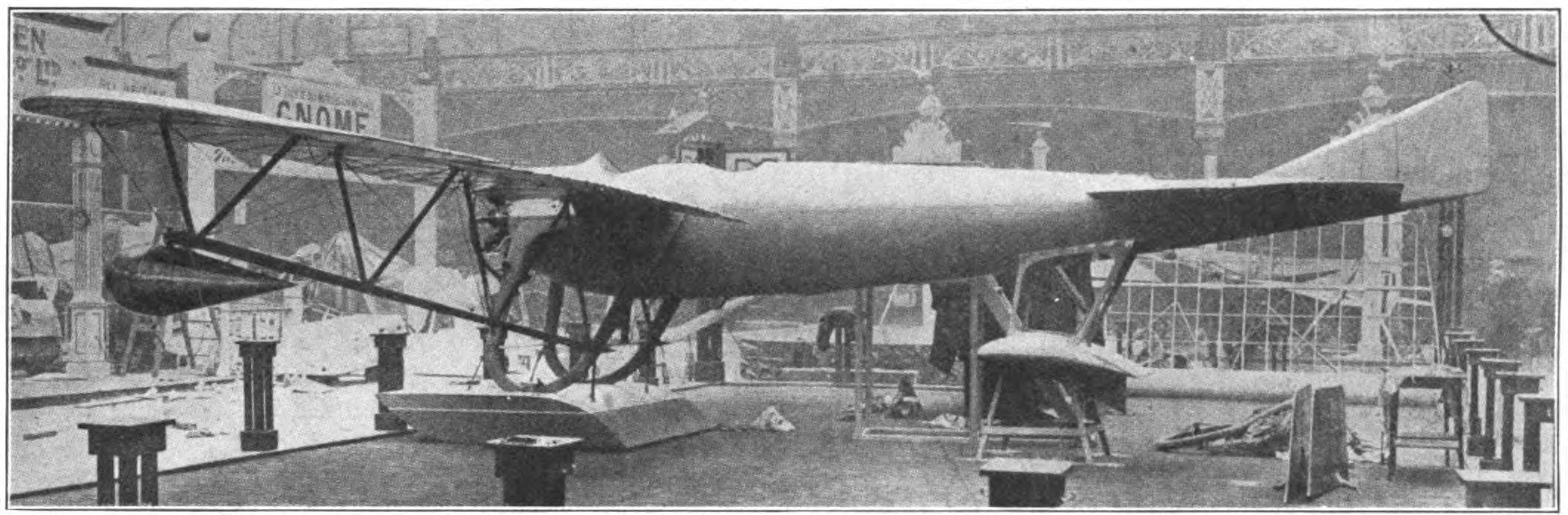
- Deperdussin Seagull on display at the 1913 Olympia Aero Show.

General information
- Type: Seaplane
- National origin: England
- Manufacturer: British Deperdussin Company
- Designer: Frederick Koolhoven

History
- First flight: 1913

The Deperdussin Seagull was a seaplane developed by the British Deperdussin Company which was the English subsidiary of French company Société Pour les Appareils Deperdussin.

== Design and development ==
In early 1912, Frederick Koolhoven was hired by Deperdussin and joined the staff of Louis Bechereau, the designer of the various Deperdussin monocoque aircraft. By the summer of 1912, he had been promoted and sent to England to oversee the design and development of the British Deperdussin Company aircraft.

The Seagull was a tractor monoplane with a monocoque fuselage construction. Instead of using wires and turnbuckles to brace the wings, which was the common practice of the time, the Seagull's wings were braced with a truss that traveled under the fuselage from wingtip to wingtip. The designers claimed that this arrangement was no heavier than the typical wire bracing and it offered better rigidity to the wings

The wings were covered in a fabric that was designed to contain any damage caused by bullet holes. The fabric was reinforced by bunches of strong threads run through the material at right angles to form squares. If damage was done to a square, the threads would prevent the damage from leaving the square.

Lateral control was achieved with wing warping and a movable rudder attached to the trailing edge of the vertical fin. A movable elevator attached to the trailing edge of the horizontal stabilizer was used for pitch control.

The landing gear consisted of a short, wide main float with two teardrop shaped floats attached to the tips of the wing truss. The tail float was aerodynamically shaped to provide lift to offset the weight of the float.

== Operational history ==
The Seagull was developed as a competitor for an Admiralty requirement for a reconnaissance seaplane. The Admiralty ordered two, but the poor performance of the prototype led to the cancellation of the order. This, combined with the War Office's ban on monoplanes, spelled the end for the further development of the Seagull.

== Specifications (Seagull) ==
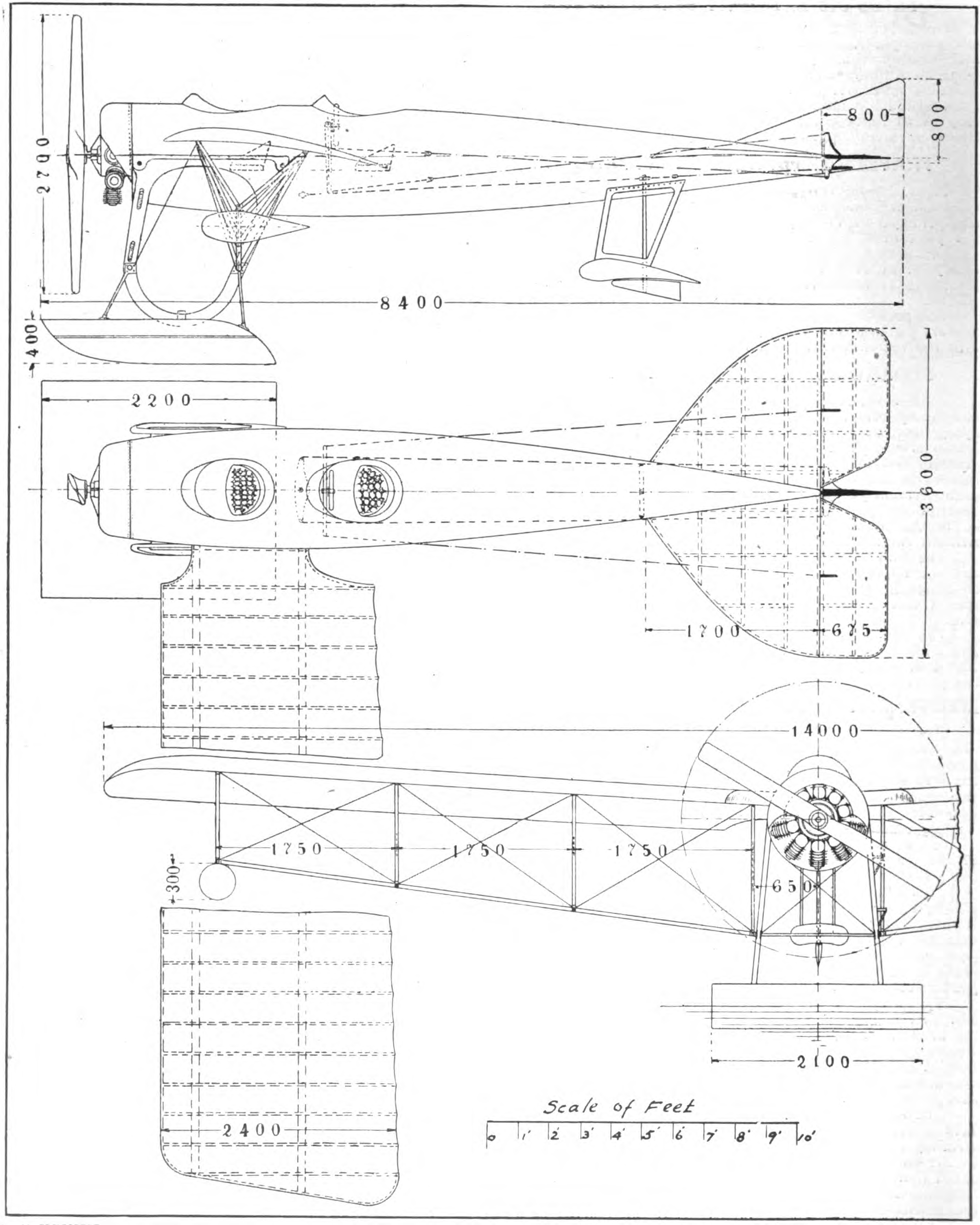
Line drawing of Deperdussin Seagull from Aero and Hydro magazine April 1913.

General characteristics

- Length: 27 ft 7 in (8.4 m)
- Wingspan: 45 ft 11 in (14 m)
- Wing area: 330 sq ft (31 m^{2})
- Powerplant: 1 × Anzani 10-cylinder air cooled radial, 100 hp (75 kW)

Performance

- Maximum speed: 63 mph (101 km/h, 55 kn)

== See also ==
- John Cyril Porte

== Bibliography ==
- "The Deperdussin Hydro-Monoplane". WWI Aero: The Journal of the Early Aeroplane (176): 43–46. May 2002. ISSN 0736-198X.
