= Blackburn White Falcon =

White Falcon
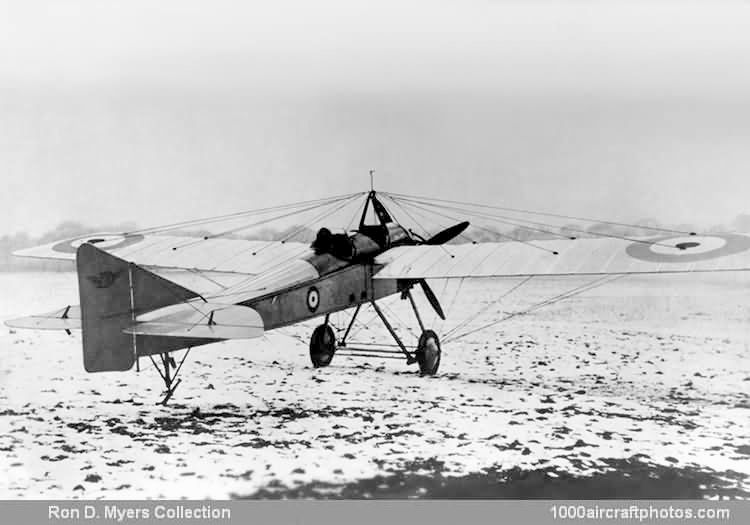

General information
- Type: personal transport
- National origin: United Kingdom
- Manufacturer: Blackburn Aeroplane and Motor Co. Ltd
- Number built: 1

History
- First flight: 1915-6

The Blackburn White Falcon was a two-seat single-engine monoplane built as a personal transport for Blackburn's test pilot during the First World War. Only one was built.

== Development ==
The White Falcon was built by Blackburn during 1915 for the personal use of their chief test pilot, W. Rowland Ding. It was a mid-wing, wire-braced monoplane with open cockpits for pilot and passenger, powered by an uncowled 100 hp (75 kW) Anzani radial engine driving a four-blade 9 ft (2.74 m) diameter propeller. The wings were of parallel chord and generally like those of the Improved Type I, though 1 ft (31 cm) greater in span, similarly wire braced to an inverted V kingpost and to the undercarriage. The wing warping wires also ran via the kingpost. The White Falcon initially used a standard B.E.2c undercarriage (Blackburn was one company manufacturing these aircraft during the war) but this was replaced later with a simpler structure without skids.

The fuselage was a standard Blackburn Warren girder structure, though of square rather than the company's previously favoured triangular cross-section. The decking was rounded. While the tailplane was like that of the Improved Type I, the fin and rudder formed a neat triangular shape with a vertical trailing edge.

The first flight date is not known nor is there much information on its use. It has been suggested that it was used by Ding to communicate with RNAS stations that had received Blackburn built B.E.2c machines, and to collect their delivery pilots. In the winter of 1916-17 it wore RAF roundels but no serial number. Rowland Ding died in a B.E.2c crash in Leeds on 12 May 1917.

== Specifications ==
Data from Jackson 1968, pp. 104

General characteristics

- Crew: one
- Capacity: one passenger
- Length: 26 ft 11.25 in (8.21 m)
- Wingspan: 39 ft 6 in (12.04 m)
- Wing area: 209 sq ft (19.4 m^{2})
- Powerplant: 1 × Anzani 10-cylinder radial piston engine , 100 hp (75 kW)
