= Cessna DC-6 =

1920s American high-wing four-seat tourer

Model DC-6
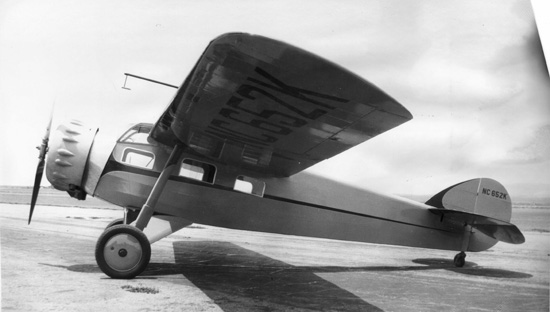
- The DC-6A

General information
- Type: Four-seat tourer
- Manufacturer: Cessna Aircraft Company
- Designer: Clyde Cessna
- Primary user: United States Army Air Corps

History
- First flight: 1929
- Developed from: Cessna CW-6

The Cessna Model DC-6 was a 1920s American high-wing four-seat tourer built by the Cessna Aircraft Company. It was used by the United States Army Air Corps as the UC-77/UC-77A.

== Design and development ==
The DC-6 was a scaled-down four-seat version of the six-seat CW-6. It was rolled out in February 1929 and went into production in two versions, the DC-6A and DC-6B. Both versions were type certificated on October 29, 1929. The Wall Street crash that day and subsequent depression reduced demand for the aircraft and only about 20 of each model were produced.

== Operational history ==
In addition to use as private touring aircraft, DC-6As and DC-6Bs saw use as newspaper delivery aircraft and were impressed as liaison aircraft with the United States Army Air Forces (USAAF) in 1942.

The DC-6A was designated the UC-77 and the DC-6B, the UC-77A; note that the company's 6B model became the 77A.

== Variants ==
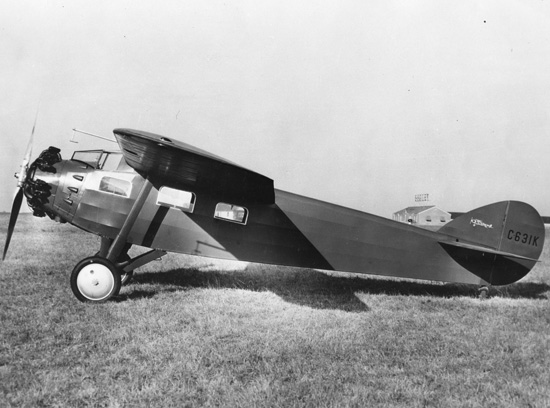
The DC-6B

DC-6
The original aircraft, powered by a 170 hp (130 kW) Curtiss Challenger, developed as a scaled-down Cessna CW-6. One built.
Model DC-6A Chief
Fitted with a 300 hp (220 kW) Wright R-975 (J-6-9) Whirlwind engine. 24 built.
Model DC-6B Scout
Fitted with a 225 hp (168 kW) Wright J-6-7 (R-760) engine; 25 built.
UC-77
Military designation of four DC-6As impressed into service by the USAAF.
UC-77A
Military designation of four DC-6Bs impressed into service by the USAAF.

- Note that the designations UC-77B, UC-77C and UC-77D were not DC-6s, they were used for the Cessna Airmaster.

== Operators ==
United States

- United States Army Air Forces

== Specifications (DC-6A Chief) ==
Data from U.S. Civil Aircraft Vol. 3 (ATC 201–300)

General characteristics

- Crew: one
- Capacity: three passengers (total four seats)
- Length: 28 ft 2 in (8.59 m)
- Wingspan: 48 ft 0 in (14.63 m)
- Height: 7 ft 8 in (2.34 m)
- Wing area: 2,880 sq ft (268 m^{2})
- Empty weight: 1,932 lb (876 kg)
- Gross weight: 3,180 lb (1,442 kg)
- Fuel capacity: 66 US gal (55 imp gal; 250 L)
- Powerplant: 1 × Wright J-6-9 9-cylinder air-cooled radial engine, 300 hp (220 kW)

Performance

- Maximum speed: 160 mph (260 km/h, 140 kn)
- Cruise speed: 130 mph (210 km/h, 110 kn)
- Stall speed: 54 mph (87 km/h, 47 kn)
- Range: 600 mi (970 km, 520 nmi)
- Service ceiling: 18,500 ft (5,600 m)
- Rate of climb: 1,300 ft/min (6.6 m/s)
