= London and Provincial Fuselage Biplane =

Fuselage Biplane

General information
- Type: Training aircraft
- National origin: United Kingdom
- Manufacturer: London and Provincial Aviation Company
- Designer: A. Fletcher
- Number built: 1

History
- First flight: July 1916

The London and Provincial Fuselage Biplane was a British single-engined two-seat training aircraft of the First World War. While the aircraft demonstrated excellent manoeuvrability, only a single example was built.

== Design and development ==
The London and Provincial Aviation Company was founded in September 1914 running a flying school at Hendon Aerodrome equipped with single seat Caudron biplanes, which it later built under license for use at the school. In 1916, A. Fletcher, previously employed at Martin & Handaside and responsible for the design of the Martinsyde Elephant, joined London and Provincial.

Fletcher's first design for London and Provincial, known as the "Fuselage" biplane or School Biplane was a single-engined tractor two-bay biplane powered by an 80 hp (60 kW) Anzani 10-cylinder engine. It was of wooden construction, with a rectangular section fuselage. It had a conventional landing gear, while ailerons were fitted to all four wings. It had two separate cockpits, with the pilot sitting in the rear one. The front cockpit could carry a single passenger, who was not provided with any flying controls.

The first Fuselage Biplane made its maiden flight in July 1916. While it proved to have excellent manoeuvrability, being easily looped, only a single example of the Fuselage biplane was built. Fletcher had produced a second design for London and Provincial, a single seat tractor biplane powered by a 50 hp (37 kW) Gnome Omega rotary engine, intended as an intermediate trainer, but this was abandoned in October 1916 before completion, causing Fletcher to leave the company.

== Operational history ==
Although the primary business of London and Provincial was training pilots for the British armed services, the Fuselage Biplane, lacking dual controls, was not used as a trainer, being used for joy-riding purposes and for parachute trials.

Following the end of the war, the Fuselage Biplane was used as the basis for a new two seat aircraft, powered by a 50 hp Gnome. The new aircraft was of crude construction compared with the 1916 aircraft which had attracted praise in the aviation press, and rather than the individual cockpits of the earlier aircraft, it had a single large cockpit. Four of the new design were built, being used for joy-riding from London and Provincial's Stag Lane Aerodrome. The new, large cockpit proved to be a major weakness, as it weakened the fuselage, allowing it to bow in and out while taxiing. This, together with the use of the Gnome rotary engine, with only single ignition, resulted in the Air Ministry refusing a Certificate of Airworthiness for the new aircraft.

London and Provincial shut down in January 1920. The original 1916 biplane, by now fitted with a 100 hp (75 kW) Anzani 10-cylinder engine and registered G-EAQW, was sold, but was scrapped later that year.

== Specifications (80 hp Anzani) ==
Data from British Aeroplanes 1914–18

General characteristics

- Crew: 2
- Length: 25 ft (7.6 m)
- Wingspan: 37 ft (11 m)
- Height: 9 ft 2 in (2.79 m) (tail up)
- Wing area: 350 sq ft (33 m^{2})
- Gross weight: 1,400 lb (635 kg)
- Powerplant: 1 × Anzani 10-cylinder radial engine, 80 hp (60 kW)

Performance

- Maximum speed: 75 mph (121 km/h, 65 kn) (approx)
- Endurance: 3 hr
