= Hawthorne, Iowa =

- Unincorporated community
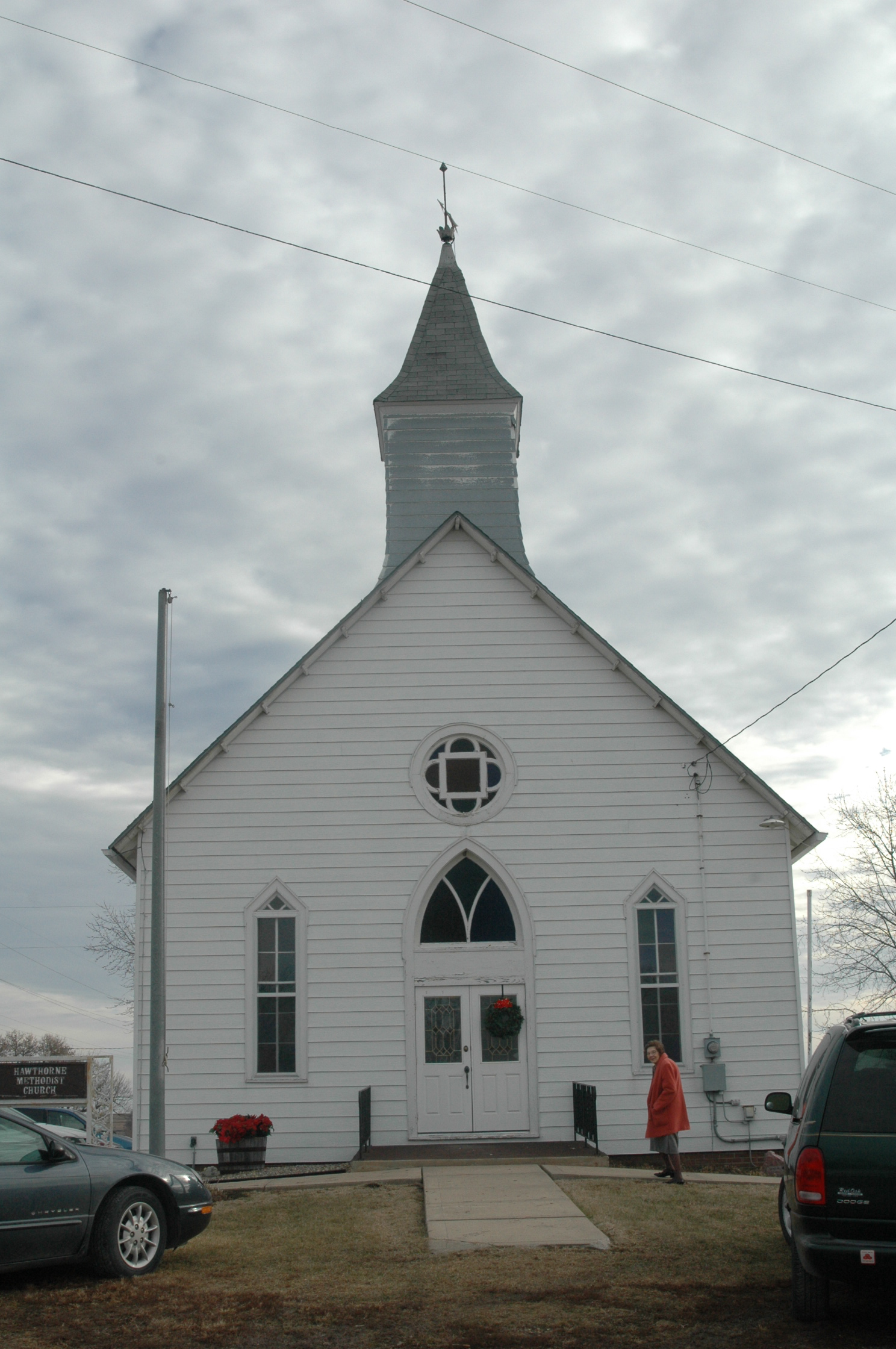
- United Methodist Church in Hawthorne

- Location within Iowa Location within the United States
- Coordinates: 41°00′06″N 95°20′13″W
- Country: United States
- State: Iowa
- County: Montgomery
- Elevation: 1,050 ft (320 m)
- Time zone: UTC-6 (Central (CST))
  - Summer (DST): UTC-5 (CDT)
- Area code: 712
- GNIS feature ID: 465589

Hawthorne is an unincorporated community in Montgomery County, Iowa, United States.

== History ==
Hawthorne's population was 71 in 1902, and 40 in 1925. The population was 20 in 1940.

== Notable person ==
- Clyde Cessna (1879–1954), aviator and businessman, was born in Hawthorne.
