= Cessna Comet =

1917 American aircraft design

Comet
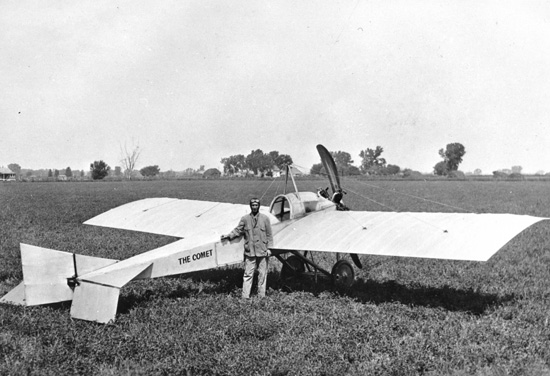
- Clyde Cessna with "The Comet"

General information
- Type: Sports plane
- Manufacturer: Clyde Cessna
- Designer: Clyde Cessna
- Number built: 1

History
- First flight: 1917

The Cessna Comet was an early aircraft designed and built by Clyde Cessna in the United States in 1917. It was a conventionally configured wire-braced monoplane with a semi-enclosed cabin that seated one passenger in addition to the pilot. On 5 July 1917, Cessna used it to set a national airspeed record of 124.6 mph (200.5 km/h) and national distance record of 76 miles (122 km) flying from Blackwell, Oklahoma, to Wichita, Kansas.

== Specifications ==
General characteristics

- Crew: One pilot
- Capacity: 1 passenger
- Powerplant: 1 × Anzani , 60 hp (45 kW)

Performance
