= Anzani 10-cylinder =

1910s French aircraft piston engine

Anzani 10
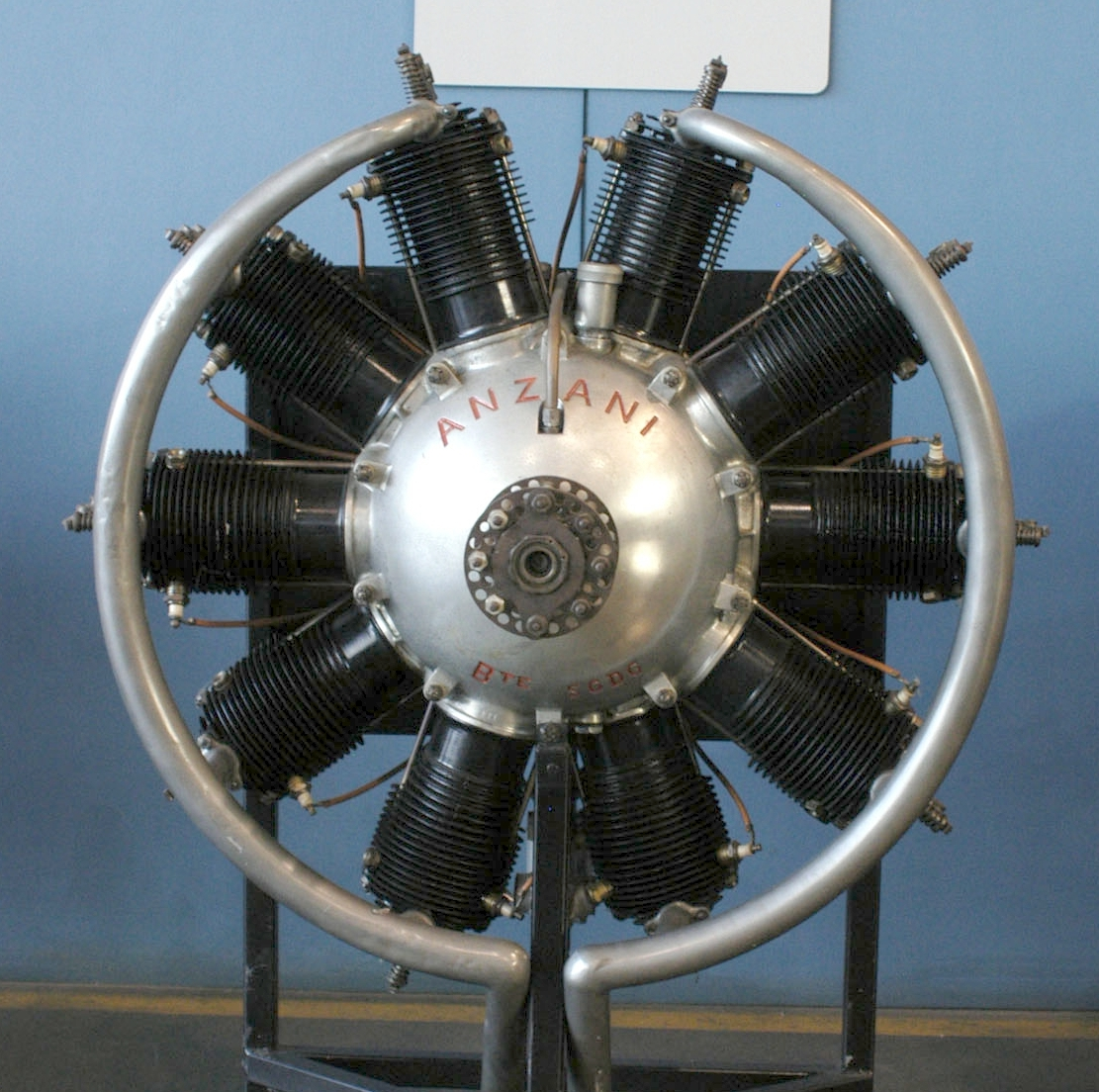
- Anzani 10, propeller side. Image from National Museum of the US Air Force
- Type: 10-cylinder radial piston
- National origin: France
- Manufacturer: Anzani
- First run: 1913

The Anzani 10 was a 1913 10-cylinder air-cooled radial aircraft engine. It powered several experimental aircraft and also the later production versions of the Caudron G.3 reconnaissance aircraft, the Caudron G.4 bomber/trainer and the first production Cessna, the Model AA.

== Design and development ==
In the first decade of the 20th century Anzani developed his upright 3-cylinder 'W' type motorcycle engine, which powered Bleriot's successful Channel crossing flight of 1909, into a three-cylinder symmetric or 'Y' radial, and from that to a 6-cylinder double-row radial engine.

By 1912 he had built the Anzani 10, a 10-cylinder engine, air-cooled like its predecessors, which, like other Anzani engines, was made with different size cylinders. One of the more powerful versions produced about 110 hp (82 kW) from 12.1 litres, a British-built Anzani 10 was rated at 125 hp and a smaller version with a displacement of 8.27 litres produced 80 hp (60 kW). It was a double row engine, built with two rows of five cylinders separated along the crankshaft by about a cylinder radius, giving the engine a slimmer profile than other contemporary two-row radial engines. Each half had its own crankpin, 180° apart, with the connecting rods, of chrome nickel steel, broad and flat to bring the two halves close together. Cylinder heads and pistons were made of cast iron, the latter machined inside and out and fitted with a pair of rings. Oil was forced through the crankshaft to the crankpins, then moved under centrifugal force to the cylinders and pistons from inside the crankcase which was a single light alloy casting.

Both inlet and exhaust valves were in the cylinder heads. The automatic inlet valves of earlier Anzani engines, opened by atmospheric pressure and closed by valve springs were retained, but fuel was fed from a mixing chamber in the crankcase via inlet tubes placed at the rear of the engine to avoid cooling of the mixture by the oncoming airflow. This arrangement placed the exhaust valves at the front of the engine, where they were operated from a cam in the rear of the crankcase via push rods and rockers. A single carburettor fed the crankcase chambers from below. Some versions used a single Gibaud magneto, running at 3,000 rpm, though others built by British Anzani had a pair of Bosch magnetos, running slower. Plugs (K.L.G. for the British variant) were mounted in the sides of the cylinder heads, sloping upwards to avoid plug fouling by lubricating oil. The exhaust was collected by a prominent pair of semi-circular manifolds.

== Operational history ==
One British-built 125 hp Anzani 10 underwent exhaustive tests at Farnborough in 1914. Several early aircraft built singly or in small numbers flew with the Anzani 10, but the major users were the Caudron G.3 and G.4, particularly the later ones in which the Anzani replaced the lower powered rotary Gnomes. Numbers of these are uncertain because of the engine change. Because they powered the 66 Caudron G.4s purchased by the American Expeditionary Force after September 1917, used largely as trainers, many Anzani 10s went to the USA. The first production aircraft built by Clyde Cessna, the Model AA was powered by the Anzani 10, and 14 of these were made. Huff-Daland also used them in several aircraft.

== Applications ==
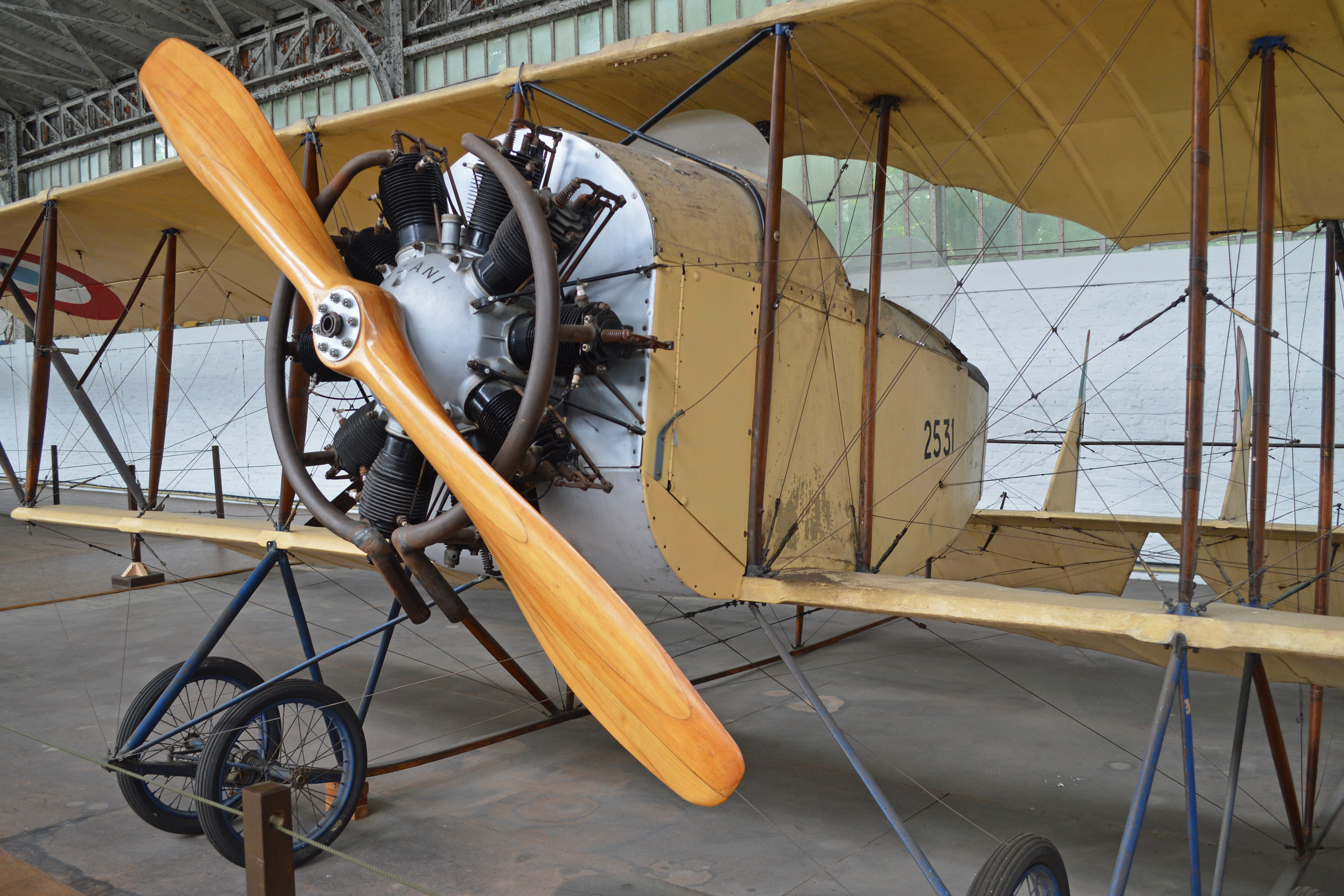
Caudron G.3

Avro 504 K G-EBWO
Bellanca CF
Blackburn Type I Land/Sea monoplane 1915
Blackburn White Falcon 1915
Blackburn Sidecar 1921
Breda-Pensuti B.2
Caudron Type F
Caudron G.3 1914
Caudron G.4 1915
Central Centaur IV 1919
Cessna Model AA 1920s
Curtiss H-4
Deperdussin Seagull 1913
Felixstowe F.1
Handley Page Type G 1913
Huff-Daland HD-1B
Huff-Daland HD-4
Huff-Daland HD-9A
Huff-Daland TA-2
London and Provincial Fuselage Biplane
Sopwith Grasshopper
Timm Collegiate
Vickers F.B. 12C 1917

== Specifications (110 hp) ==
Data from

=== General characteristics ===
- Type: two-row ten-cylinder radial piston engine
- Bore: 105 mm (4.13 in)
- Stroke: 140 mm (5.51 in)
- Displacement: 12.12 litres (739.8 cu in)
- Dry weight: 140 kg (308 lb)
- Designer: A. Anzani

=== Components ===
- Valvetrain: One inlet and one exhaust valves/cylinder. Automatic inlet valves, push and rocker operated exhaust valves.
- Fuel system: Single carburettor mounted between lowest cylinders, mixing chamber in crankcase. Single magneto. Plugs were fitted in the upper side of the cylinder head to avoid fouling.
- Cooling system: air-cooled

=== Performance ===
- Power output: 82 kW (110 hp)
- Power-to-weight ratio: 0.59 kW/kg (0.36 hp/lb)

== See also ==
Related lists

- List of aircraft engines
