= Cessna Model A =

1920s American Touring Aircraft

Model A
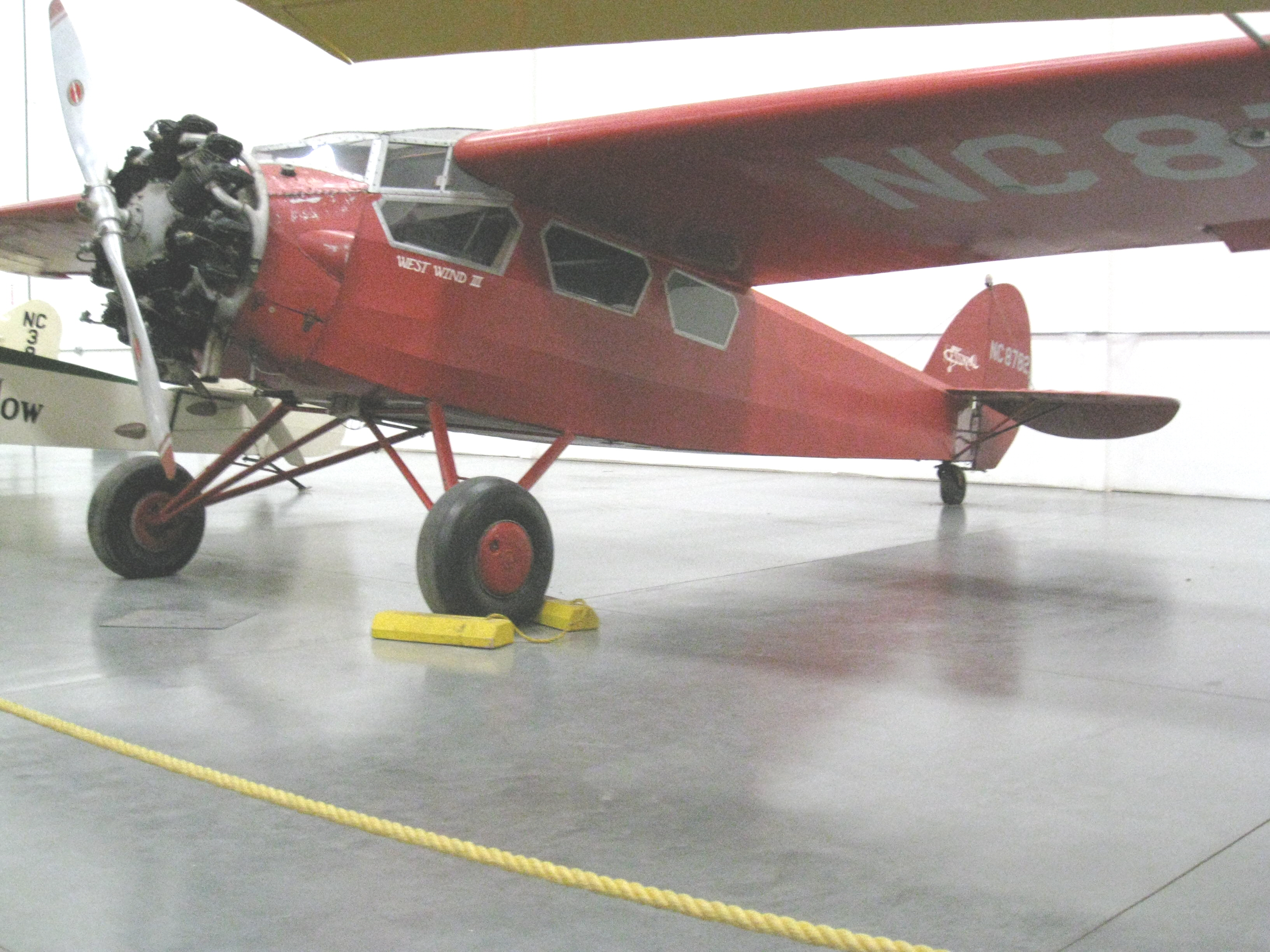
- Cessna AW at Yanks Museum, Chino, California

General information
- Type: Four-seat tourer
- Manufacturer: Cessna Aircraft Company
- Designer: Clyde Cessna
- Primary user: private owners
- Number built: 83

History
- First flight: 1927

The Cessna Model A is a 1920s American high-wing four-seat tourer built by the Cessna Aircraft Company, the first in a long line of high-wing single-engined monoplanes.

== Design and development ==
The first Cessna design built in any numbers was the Cessna Model A, a four-seater with a mixed wood and steel-tube construction with fabric covering. The aircraft was built in a number of variants fitted with different engines.

The prototype (Model AC) first flew in 1927 and the first production aircraft appeared in the following year.

== Variants ==
Model AA
Fitted with a 120 hp (89 kW) Anzani 10 engine, 14 built.
Model AC
Fitted with a 130 hp (97 kW) Comet 7-RA engine, one built.
Model AF
Fitted with a 150 hp (112 kW) Floco/Axelson engine, three built.
Model AS
Fitted with a 125 hp (93 kW) Siemens-Halske engine, four built.
Model AW
Fitted with a 125 hp (93 kW) Warner Scarab engine, 48 built.
Model BW
A three-seat version with a 220 hp (164 kW) Wright J-5 engine, 13 built.

== Specifications (Cessna AA) ==
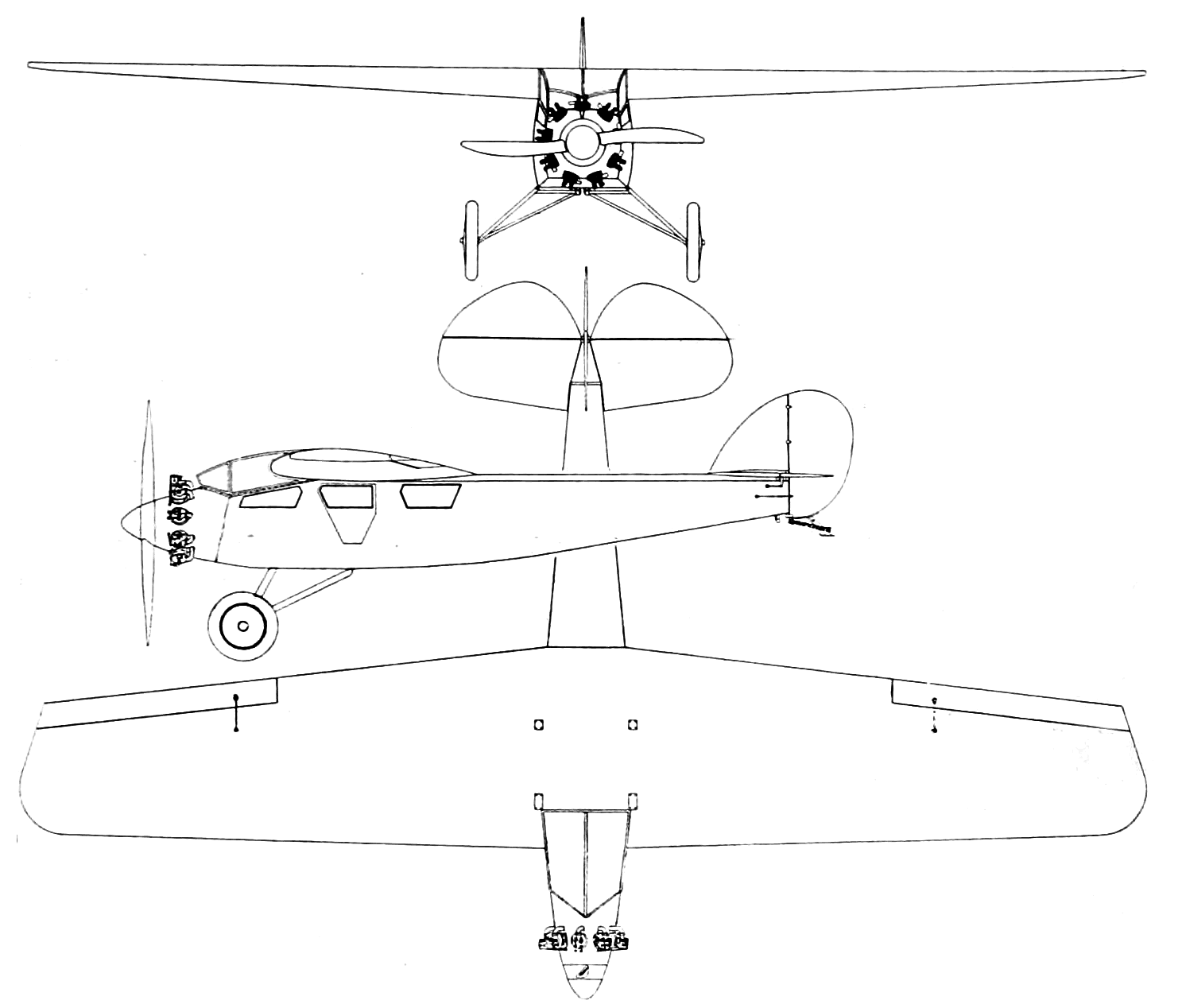
Cessna AF 3-view drawing from Aero Digest March 1928

Data from Les Ailes, May 1928

General characteristics

- Crew: Two pilots
- Capacity: Two passengers
- Length: 23 ft 9 in (7.23 m)
- Wingspan: 40 ft 7 in (12.36 m)
- Height: 7 ft 4 in (2.24 m)
- Wing area: 222 sq ft (20.6 m^{2})
- Empty weight: 1,248 lb (566 kg)
- Gross weight: 2,273 lb (1,031 kg)
- Fuel capacity: 42 US gal; 35 imp gal (160 L)
- Powerplant: 1 × Anzani 10 10-cylinder radial, 120 hp (89 kW)
- Propellers: 2-bladed

Performance

- Maximum speed: 115 mph (185 km/h, 100 kn)
- Cruise speed: 100 mph (161 km/h, 87 kn)
- Stall speed: 45 mph (72 km/h, 39 kn) minimum speed
- Service ceiling: 7,005 ft (2,135 m)
