= Taco Tico =

Chain of Tex-Mex cuisine fast-food restaurants

- Company type: Private company
- Industry: Restaurants
- Founded: Wichita, Kansas (1962; 64 years ago)
- Headquarters: Wichita, Kansas
- Products: Tacos, Burritos, Enchiladas, Taco Burger, Nachos, Sanchos, Taco Salad, and Cinnamon Crustos
- Website: tacotico.us

Taco Tico is a chain of Tex-Mex cuisine fast-food restaurants headquartered in Wichita, Kansas, United States.

== History ==
In late 1960, brothers Dan and Robin Foley went to work for their cousins, Richard and Mike Foley at their fast food Mexican restaurants, Taco Grande. Soon thereafter, Dan and Robin left their positions and opened the first Taco Tico in 1962, in their native Wichita, Kansas, and began franchising new locations in 1967. The company was a regional hit by 1980.

In 1988, Foley sold the company and chain to a former executive from KFC. The meat recipe, which gave Taco Tico tacos their unique flavor, was changed at that time. This meat was sent to the stores in frozen tubes from the main distribution center. The new flavoring was unpopular and Taco Tico has since switched back to the original.

On March 5, 2013, 10 restaurants were closed by the Kansas Department of Revenue for failure to remit $434,939.23 in sales tax. The restaurants were later reopened after a bankruptcy filing and a deal between Ajax International Group and the Kansas Department of Revenue. Three independently franchised locations were unaffected by the closure or bankruptcy filing.

On July 11, 2013, the State of Kansas again closed 10 Taco Tico franchises for failure to pay state taxes.

Three remaining Wichita-area Taco Tico restaurants closed in August and September 2013.

On February 5, 2014, the new owner reopened one of the former Wichita locations, with plans to open at least four more stores in Wichita by the end of 2014. On October 25, 2014, one of the closed locations in Topeka reopened after being purchased by new owners.

By November 2018, the company had two stores in Wichita, and one store each in Arkansas City, Augusta, Derby, and Newton, Kansas.

In 2019, the company opened one store in El Dorado, Kansas

Now privately owned (no longer franchise) Taco Ticos include locations in Claremore, Oklahoma; El Dorado, Kansas; Derby, Kansas; Topeka, Kansas; Texarkana, Texas; Lexington, Kentucky; Duncan, Oklahoma; Mason City, Iowa; Fort Dodge, Iowa; and Kenner, Louisiana.
