= Clyde Cessna =

American aircraft designer (1879–1954)

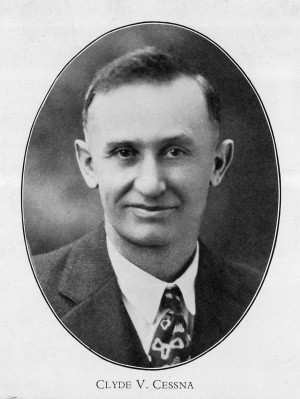
- Cessna circa 1920
- Born: December 5, 1879; Hawthorne, Iowa, U.S.
- Died: November 20, 1954 (aged 74); Wichita, Kansas, U.S.
- Occupations: Aircraft designer, aviator, aviation entrepreneur
- Known for: Cessna Aircraft founder
- Spouse: Europa Dotzour (m. 1905)
- Children: 2
- Relatives: Dwane Wallace (nephew)

Clyde Vernon Cessna (/ˈsɛsnə/; December 5, 1879 – November 20, 1954) was an American aircraft designer, aviator, and early aviation entrepreneur. He is best known as the principal founder of the Cessna Aircraft Corporation, which he started in 1927 in Wichita, Kansas.

== Biography ==
=== Early years ===
Cessna was born on December 5, 1879, in Hawthorne, in Montgomery County, Iowa, the son of Mary Vandora (Skates) and James William Cessna. Cessna's family was of French and German ancestry. When he was two years old, his family moved to rural Rago in Kingman County, Kansas, along the Chikaskia River. During his boyhood he used his self-taught innovation and mechanical skills to improve farm machinery and to develop new farming methods. He later became a successful car dealer in Enid, Oklahoma.

Cessna's interest in aviation began in 1910 after witnessing an aerial exhibition in his home state of Kansas. It was this exhibition that led him in future years to pursue his career in aviation. After realizing his interest in aviation, Cessna left Oklahoma and moved to New York State where he worked for a short period at the Queen Aeroplane Company where he first learned about the construction of aircraft.

=== First flight ===
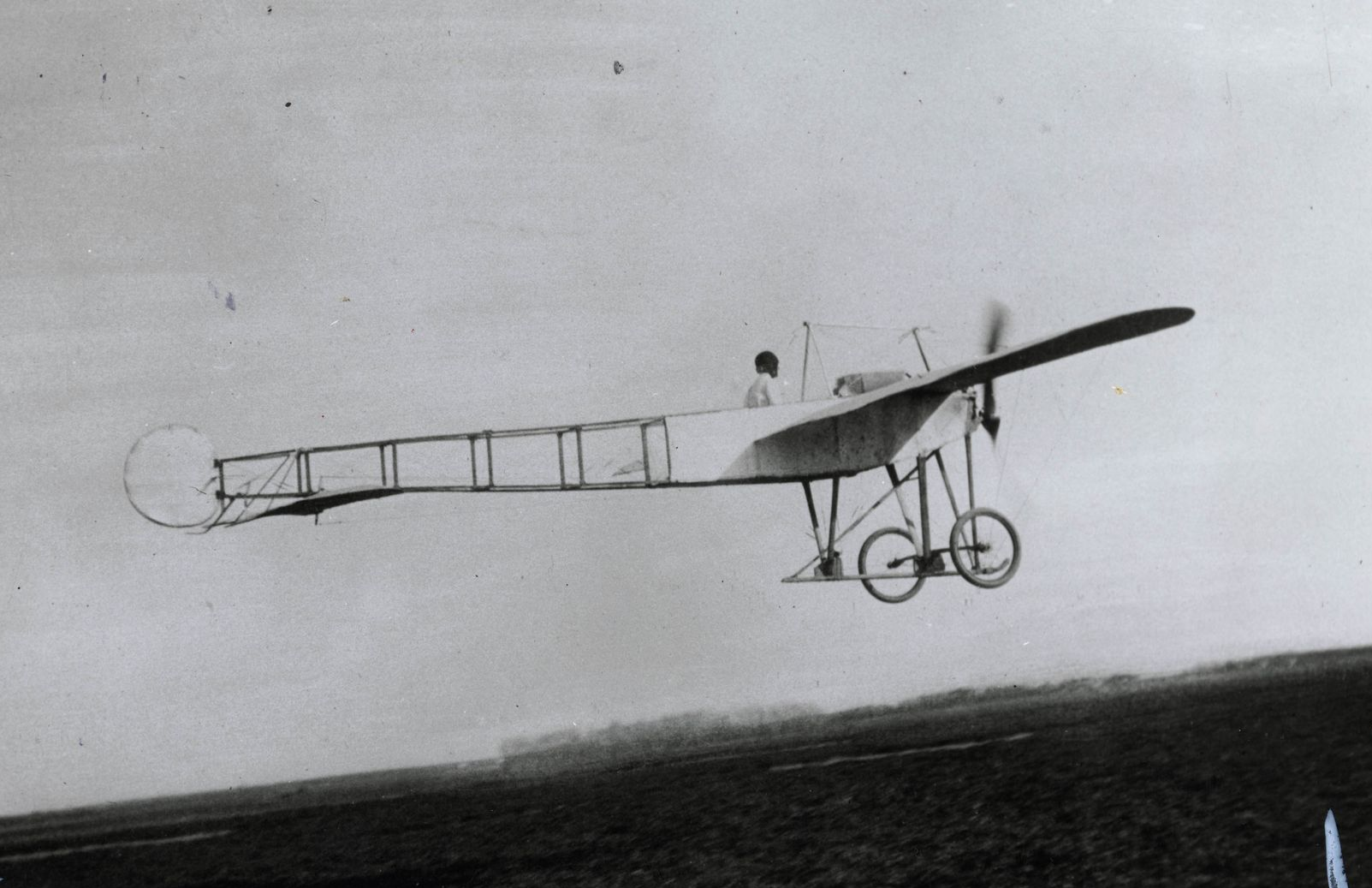
Cessna Silverwing test flight in 1911

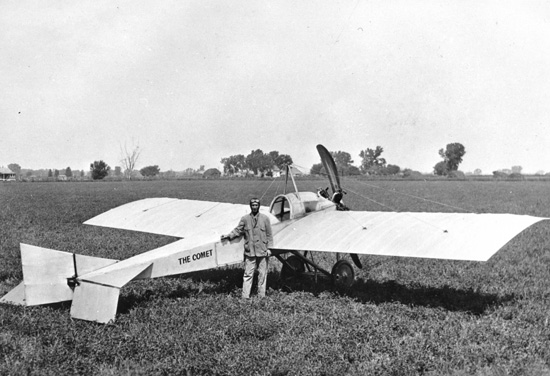
Cessna with his second design, "The Comet", an improved version of the Silverwing, circa 1916

In 1911, he set out to build his first airplane, an airplane he named "Silverwing". His first design was a monoplane, constructed of spruce and linen and which took the form of an American version of the Bleriot XI. The engine was a modified Elbridge motorboat motor, dubbed the "aero special", which was a 2-stroke, 4-cylinder engine with a maximum of 40 hp (30 kW) and 1,050 rpm. Upon completion, he sought to test the aircraft at the Great Salt Plains (adjacent to the Salt Plains National Wildlife Refuge) in Alfalfa County, Oklahoma. His first attempt at flight ended in a ground loop, which required $100 to repair. After repairs, Cessna attempted flight 13 more times, each time ending in some sort of failure. Finally on his 13th attempt, Cessna got a glimpse of hope as his aircraft bounced up into the air for a short time before crashing into the trees as he attempted to turn it. After his crash, Cessna exclaimed in frustration, "I'm going to fly this thing, then I'm going to set it afire and never have another thing to do with aeroplanes!". Finally, in June 1911 Cessna had his first successful flight. The crowds that had scoffed at his failures changed their tone and began calling him a "daring hero" and nicknamed him the "Birdman of Enid". Cessna continued to teach himself how to fly over the next several months until December 1911, when he made a successful 5-mile (8.0 km) flight and a successful landing at the point of departure. He was the first person to build and fly an airplane in the Heartland of the United States—between the Mississippi River and the Rocky Mountains.

=== The middle years ===
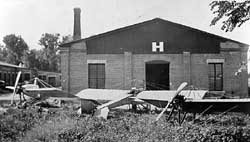
The factory from 1917

After the success of the Silverwing, Cessna permanently quit his work with the automobile industry to pursue his interests in aviation. Between 1912 and 1915, Cessna developed several new monoplanes, all powered by an Anzani 6-cylinder with 40–60 hp. During this time, Cessna often flew his aircraft at holiday events and county fairs, an endeavour that at the time proved to be lucrative.

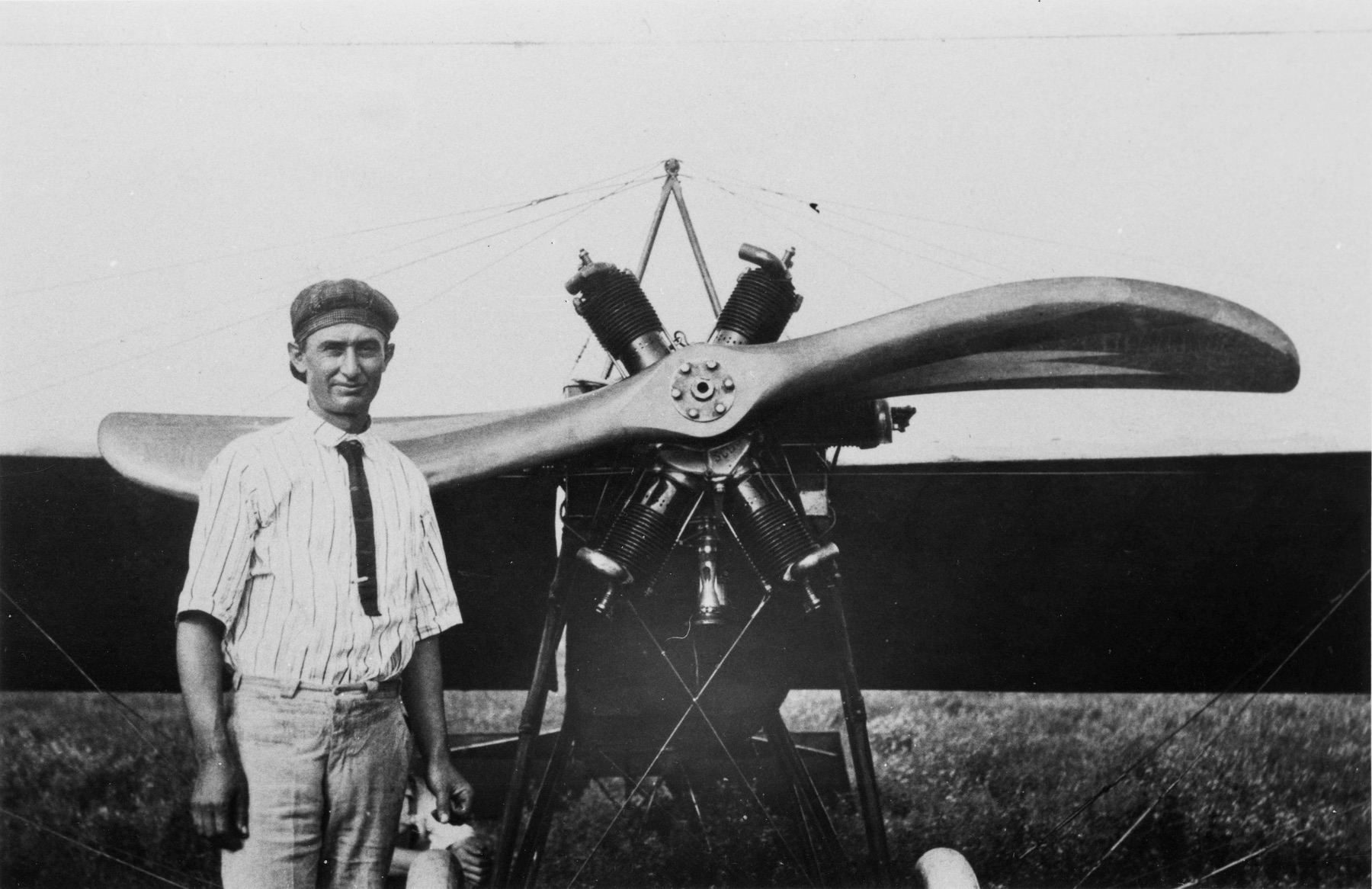
Cessna circa 1917

It was in 1916 that Cessna acquired a vacant building to begin building a new aircraft for the 1917 aviation exhibition season. His factory served a dual purpose, as he also opened a flight school in which he enrolled five student pilots. However, in April 1917 when the United States declared war, the exhibition flying market ground to a halt. With his primary source of income grounded, Cessna returned to his old home near Rago, Kansas, where he resumed his duties on the family farm.

=== Travel Air Manufacturing Company ===
In the years following World War I public interest in private flying increased, leading Cessna in 1925, along with Walter Beech and Lloyd Stearman, to found the Travel Air Manufacturing Company in Wichita, Kansas. While Cessna was president, the company soon became one of the leading US aircraft manufacturers. This success can be attributed to Cessna's advanced design concepts, creating aircraft that attained international recognition, while establishing numerous speed and distance records. After two years, Cessna left the company with plans to start his own firm, due to disputes with his partners over the monoplane design or the biplane design.

=== Cessna Aircraft Corporation ===
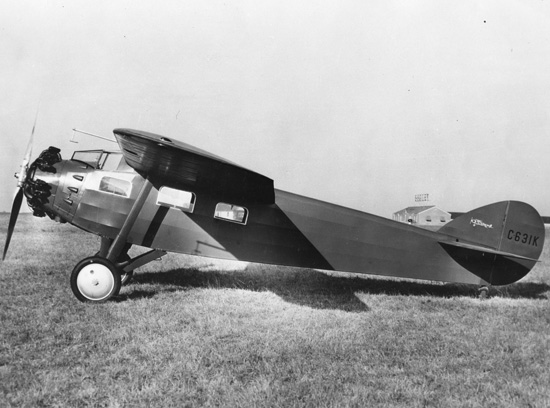
A 1929 Cessna DC-6

On September 7, 1927, Cessna and aviation entrepreneur Victor Roos paired to form Cessna-Roos Aircraft. Roos resigned just one month into the partnership, selling back his interest to Cessna, and the company changed its name to Cessna Aircraft Corporation in December. In the later part of 1927, Cessna struggled to design and build an efficient monoplane. The AW was completed near the end of 1927.

Cessna followed the AW with the CW-6, which flew in 1928, and the DC-6, which flew in 1929. He then collaborated with his son, Eldon, in designing and flying the CR-series racing aircraft.

Despite the success of new models, the Great Depression led to a catastrophic decline in aircraft sales, a bankruptcy filing for the corporation, and the complete closure of the company in 1931. In 1934, Cessna reopened his Wichita plant, which he soon sold to his nephews—aeronautical engineer Dwane Wallace and his brother, attorney Dwight Wallace—in 1936.

After turning over the Cessna Aircraft Corporation to his nephews, Dwane and Dwight Wallace, Cessna returned to a life of farming. Clyde operated an early diesel three-track tractor building ponds for local farmers. Upon Dwane's request, he agreed to participate in the company but served mostly in a ceremonial capacity and stayed out of the company's day-to-day business.

== Death and legacy ==
Cessna died on November 20, 1954, at the age of 74 in Wichita, Kansas.

He was posthumously inducted into the National Aviation Hall of Fame in 1978 and the International Air & Space Hall of Fame in 1983. He was ranked number 27 on Flying magazine's list of the 51 Heroes of Aviation in 2013. The Kingman Airport – Clyde Cessna Field in Kingman, Kansas is named in his honor.
