= Valley Township, Kingman County, Kansas =

Valley Township
- Township
- Location in Kingman County
- Coordinates: 37°25′30″N 98°05′01″W
- Country: United States
- State: Kansas
- County: Kingman

Area
  - Total: 36.29 sq mi (93.98 km^{2})
  - Land: 36.24 sq mi (93.85 km^{2})
  - Water: 0.054 sq mi (0.14 km^{2}) 0.15%
- Elevation: 1,499 ft (457 m)

Population (2020)
  - Total: 87
  - Density: 2.4/sq mi (0.93/km^{2})
- GNIS feature ID: 0470417

Valley Township is a township in Kingman County, Kansas, United States. As of the 2020 census, its population was 87.

== Geography ==
Valley Township covers an area of 36.29 square miles (93.98 square kilometers); of this, 0.05 square miles (0.14 square kilometers) or 0.15 percent is water. The streams of Copper Creek, Red Creek and Rose Bud Creek run through this township.

=== Communities ===
- Rago

(This list is based on USGS data and may include former settlements.)

=== Adjacent townships ===
- Richland Township (north)
- Eagle Township (northeast)
- Canton Township (east)
- Township No. 6, Harper County (southeast)
- Township No. 1, Harper County (southwest)
- Chikaskia Township (west)
- Belmont Township (northwest)

=== Cemeteries ===
The township contains one cemetery, Rago.

=== Major highways ===
- K-14
- K-42
