= Bennett Township, Kansas =

Bennett Township
- Township
- Location in Kingman County
- Coordinates: 37°25′45″N 97°51′29″W
- Country: United States
- State: Kansas
- County: Kingman

Area
  - Total: 36.49 sq mi (94.51 km^{2})
  - Land: 36.49 sq mi (94.51 km^{2})
  - Water: 0 sq mi (0 km^{2}) 0%
- Elevation: 1,427 ft (435 m)

Population (2020)
  - Total: 623
  - Density: 17.1/sq mi (6.59/km^{2})
- GNIS feature ID: 0470280

Bennett Township is a township in Kingman County, Kansas, United States. As of the 2020 census, its population was 623.

== Geography ==
Bennett Township covers an area of 36.49 square miles (94.51 square kilometers).

=== Communities ===
- Norwich

=== Adjacent townships ===
- Allen Township (north)
- Erie Township, Sedgwick County (northeast)
- Eden Township, Sumner County (east)
- Township No. 6, Harper County (southwest)
- Canton Township (west)
- Eagle Township (northwest)

=== Cemeteries ===
The township contains two cemeteries: Stitch and Upchurch.

=== Major highways ===
- K-2
- K-42

=== Airports and landing strips ===
- Norwich Landing Strip
