= Canton Township, Kingman County, Kansas =

Canton Township
- Township
- Location in Kingman County
- Coordinates: 37°25′51″N 97°57′53″W
- Country: United States
- State: Kansas
- County: Kingman

Area
  - Total: 36.30 sq mi (94.01 km^{2})
  - Land: 36.28 sq mi (93.97 km^{2})
  - Water: 0.015 sq mi (0.04 km^{2}) 0.04%
- Elevation: 1,381 ft (421 m)

Population (2020)
  - Total: 84
  - Density: 2.3/sq mi (0.89/km^{2})
- GNIS ID: 470281

Canton Township is a township in Kingman County, Kansas, United States. As of the 2020 census, its population was 84.

== Geography ==
Canton Township covers an area of 36.3 square miles (94.01 square kilometers). 0.01 square miles (0.04 square kilometers) or 0.04 percent of this area is made up of water. The streams of Big Spring Creek, Blue Stem Creek and Duck Creek run through this township.

=== Communities ===
- Adams

(This list is based on USGS data and may include former settlements.)

=== Adjacent townships ===
- Eagle Township (north)
- Allen Township (northeast)
- Bennett Township (east)
- Township 6, Harper County (south)
- Valley Township (west)
- Richland Township (northwest)

=== Major highways ===
- K-42
