= K-42 (Kansas highway) =

State highway in Kansas, U.S.

K-42
- K-42 highlighted in red

Route information
- Maintained by KDOT and the city of Wichita
- Length: 75.061 mi (120.799 km)
- Existed: 1926–present

Major junctions
- West end: US-281 in Sawyer
- K-14 in Rago; K-2 by Norwich
- East end: I-235 in Wichita

Location
- Country: United States
- State: Kansas
- Counties: Pratt, Kingman, Sumner, Sedgwick

Highway system
- Kansas State Highway System; Interstate; US; State; Spurs
← K-41	→ K-43

K-42 is a 75.061-mile-long (120.799 km) east–west state highway in the U.S. state of Kansas. Its western terminus is at U.S. Route 281 (US-281) in Sawyer and the eastern terminus is at Interstate 235 (I-235) in Wichita. Along the way K-42 intersects K-14, a major north–south highway, in Rago and K-2 east of Norwich. The highway is a two-lane highway for most of its length with the exception of the section within Wichita, which is a four-lane divided highway.

K-42 was first designated as a state highway in 1926, and at that time extended from east of Coates east to US-81 west of Belle Plaine. By 1928, K-42 was realigned to turn north by Milton, then continue to slightly west of Clearwater where it turned northeast and ended in Wichita. Also by 1928, K-8 was realigned to the east to go through Sawyer instead of Coats, which truncated K-42's western terminus to Sawyer. By 1939, K-8 was renumbered as US-281. The entire length was paved by 1957. K-2 overlapped K-42 from east of Norwich to its eastern terminus before December 21, 1994. K-42 formally extended to US-54 and US-400, then in March 2001, the eastern terminus was truncated to I-235.

== Route description ==
The Kansas Department of Transportation (KDOT) tracks the traffic levels on its highways. On K-42 in 2020, they determined that on average the traffic varied from 325 vehicles per day near the western terminus to 16,500 vehicles per day near the eastern terminus. The second highest was the section between K-2 and Wichita where it was between 2,500 and 5,000 vehicles per day. All but 0.578 miles (1 km) of K-42's alignment is maintained by KDOT. The entire section within Wichita is maintained by the city. K-42 connects to the National Highway System at its junction with Interstate 235 (I-235) in Wichita.

=== Sawyer to Rago ===
K-42's western terminus is at US-281, known as Main Street, in Sawyer in Pratt County. The highway begins traveling east as Broadway Street and soon exits the city. The roadway continues through farmland to a crossing over Sand Creek after which it proceeds to Southeast 100th Avenue, where it makes a sharp curve south. K-42 continues south a short distance to the Pratt–Barber county line, where it curves back east. The highway passes along the north edge of Isabel for a short distance. The roadway continues through farmland along the county line as it enters Kingman County. K-42 continues east to Saint Leo Road, where it curves south. The roadway proceeds south for a short distance then curves east and enters Nashville as Broadway Street.

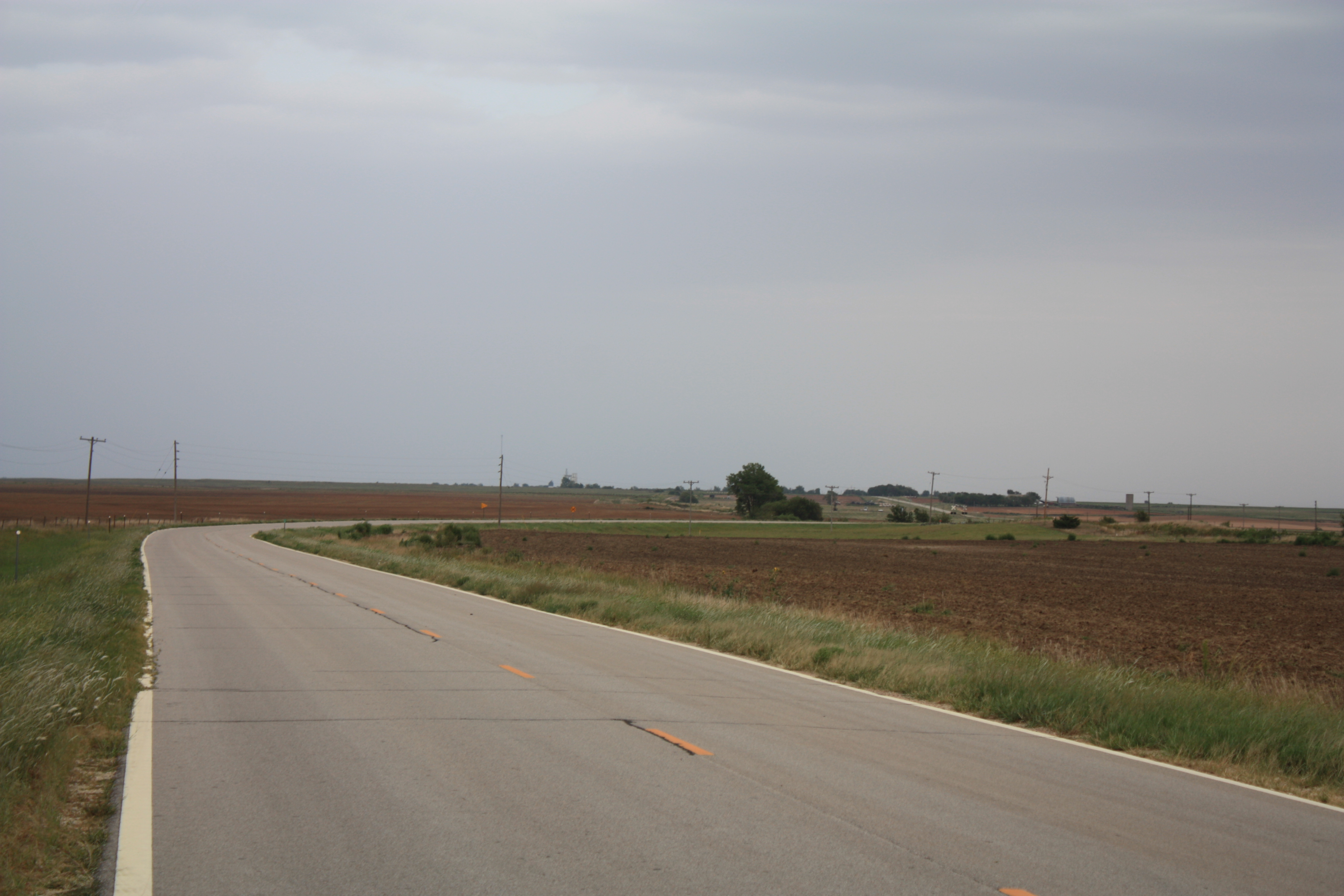
K-42 in southern Kingman County as it crosses the Kansas and Oklahoma Railroad.

Outside the city, K-42 continues to parallel a Kansas and Oklahoma Railroad (KO) track as it advances east through farmland. The highway makes a gradual s-curve to allow an at-grade crossing with a KO track. Now on the south side of the railroad, K-42 continues east then reaches Zenda. The highway proceeds through the city for a short distance as Central Avenue. K-42 then reaches an at-grade crossing with a KO track, which it begins to parallel. The two shift slightly north then cross the Chikaskia River. The highway soon crosses Wild Horse Creek then enters Spivey as Stanley Avenue. K-42 continues to Main Street, where it curves north. The highway continues along Main Street before curving east and exiting the city. The roadway advances east to a crossing over Red Creek, then has an at-grade crossing with a KO track then intersects K-14 south of Kingman by Rago.

=== Rago to Wichita ===
K-42 advances east through farmland, crossing over Copper Creek and Duck Creek, before reaching Adams where it crosses Deer Creek. The roadway continues to crossing over Big Spring Creek then a crossing over Clearwater Creek. K-42 soon makes a gentle s-curve where a former railroad crossing was then continues east. The highway proceeds to an at-grade crossing with a KO track then enters Norwich as Burns Avenue. The roadway exits the city and soon enters Sumner County. Just after crossing the county line, K-42 intersects the eastern terminus of K-2. The highway passes through Suppesville, then curves northeast and enters Sedgwick County.

Just inside the county, K-42 intersects the northern terminus of K-49 slightly north of Viola. The roadway continues northeast to a crossing over the Ninnescah River. The highway crosses Spring Creek then reaches Clonmel. K-42 advances northeast to an intersection with South 135th Street, which travels south to Clearwater. The highway reaches Schulte where it transions to a four-lane divided highway. The roadway then enters Wichita and begins to pass along the south side of the Eisenhower National Airport. K-42 crosses the Wichita Valley Center Floodway then reaches its eastern terminus at a partial cloverleaf interchange with I-235 at exit 5. Past I-235 the roadway continues as West Southwest Boulevard.

== History ==
K-42 was first designated as a state highway in 1926. At that time it extended from K-8 east of Coats, east through Sawyer and Nashville, to K-14 in Rago. It then continued east through Milton and Conway Springs before intersecting US-81 west of Belle Plaine. By 1928, K-42 was realigned to turn north, north of Milton, then continue through Viola to just west of Clearwater. Then zig-zagged northeastward from there to Wichita. The old alignment between north of Milton and US-81 became locally maintained. Also by 1928, K-8 was realigned to the east to go through Sawyer instead of Coats, and at that time K-42's western terminus was truncated to end at the new alignment in Sawyer. Between July 1938 and 1939, K-8 was renumbered as US-281.

In a resolution approved on March 21, 1939, K-42 was approved to be realigned between Viola and Wichita. This realignment would replace a substandard section of highway, eliminate seven sharp curves, and bypass Clearwater. On June 4, 1939, Governor Payne Ratner stated in a radio broadcast that the State Highway Department was holding up on the K-42 rerouting project, because the state could not afford to spend its money on unconnected stretches of highway. The section referred to as "unconnected" was the section between Schulte and Wichita. Advocates for the project, including cities along the new route, stated that the end of the new route by Schulte could be connected to the existing route via a county road until the new section was completed from Schulte to Viola. The new alignment between Schulte and Wichita opened in April 1940. On April 25, 1941, the SHC asked for bids for a project to build a new alignment of K-42 between Viola and Clonmel. At this time the section between Clonmel and Schulte was complete. When the section between Viola and Clonmel was being completed, the highway went directly south from Clonmel to meet the old alignment east of Viola.

On September 14, 1943, state highway engineer R. C. Keeling wrote a letter to an Aero Parts official, stating it was almost impossible to maintain a sand and gravel road with the high amount of traffic using it. He recommended that the highway should be paved. On December 4, 1944, two buses carrying employees were unable to reach the Aero Parts plant and needed tow trucks to pull them. A week earlier, four heavy duty bus springs were broken. The bus company threatened to discontinue service to the plant unless Aero Parts officials made efforts to have the highway improved. On January 30, 1945, Governor Andrew Schoeppel received a petition with 1,712 signatures which asked that K-42 be given a hard surface. The highway was paved from Wichita to Viola by 1948.

In a resolution approved on January 28, 1949, it was approved to realign K-42 from current North Argonia Road east to K-49 in Viola. On April 30, 1949, the SHC approved two bids for the project. One was for grading at a cost of $125,962 (equivalent to $1.31 million in 2024), and the other for two bridges at a cost of $11,967 (equivalent to $125,000 in 2024 dollars). The realignment, which was completed by 1953, eliminated two sharp turns. The section from Norwich east to Viola was paved by October 15, 1950. On June 12, 1953, it was announced that it was expected to be paved from Norwich west to Rago by Fall of that year. The remaining section west to Sawyer was expected to be paved by 1955. The entire length was paved by 1957.

By 1962, I-235 had been built in Wichita, which included an interchange with K-42. In mid May 1967, the SHC approved a bid of $88,694 (equivalent to $635,000 in 2024 dollars) to rebuild the junction with K-2 east of Norwich. In a resolution approved on December 21, 1994, the overlap with K-2 was eliminated, and K-2 was truncated to its current northern terminus. Before 2001, K-42 continued past I-235 and terminated at US-54 and US-400. The route was truncated to its current eastern terminus at I-235 in March 2001.

== Major intersections ==
County	Location	mi	km	Destinations	Notes
Pratt	Sawyer	0.000	0.000	US-281 (Main Street) – Medicine Lodge, Pratt	Western terminus; road continues as Broadway Street
Kingman	Rago	32.759	52.721	K-14 – Kingman, Anthony	
Sumner	Eden Township	48.911	78.715	K-2 south – Anthony, Harper	Northern terminus of K-2
Sedgwick	Viola Township	57.494	92.528	K-49 south (Grice Street) – Conway Springs, Viola	Northern terminus of K-49
Sedgwick	Wichita	75.061	120.799	I-235	Eastern terminus; I-235 exit 5; former US 81 Byp.; partial cloverleaf interchange
Sedgwick	Wichita	75.061	120.799	Southwest Boulevard northeast	Continuation past I-235; former K-2/K-42
1.000 mi = 1.609 km; 1.000 km = 0.621 mi
