= Chikaskia Township, Kingman County, Kansas =

Chikaskia Township
- Township
- Location in Kingman County
- Coordinates: 37°25′30″N 98°11′31″W
- Country: United States
- State: Kansas
- County: Kingman

Area
  - Total: 36.24 sq mi (93.85 km^{2})
  - Land: 36.23 sq mi (93.84 km^{2})
  - Water: 0.0039 sq mi (0.01 km^{2}) 0.01%
- Elevation: 1,516 ft (462 m)

Population (2020)
  - Total: 100
  - Density: 2.8/sq mi (1.1/km^{2})
- GNIS feature ID: 0485521

Chikaskia Township is a township in Kingman County, United States. As of the 2020 census, its population was 100.

== Geography ==
Chikaskia Township covers an area of 36.24 square miles (93.85 square kilometers); of this, 0.01 square miles (0.01 square kilometers) or 0.01 percent is water. The streams of Sand Creek and Wild Horse Creek run through this township.

=== Communities ===
- Spivey

=== Adjacent townships ===
- Belmont Township (north)
- Richland Township (northeast)
- Valley Township (east)
- Township No. 1, Harper County (south)
- Rochester Township (west)
- Peters Township (northwest)

=== Major highways ===
- K-42

=== Airports and landing strips ===
- Dick Landing Strip
