= Erie Township, Sedgwick County, Kansas =

Township in Sedgwick County, Kansas, U.S.

Erie Township Sedgwick County, Kansas
- Township
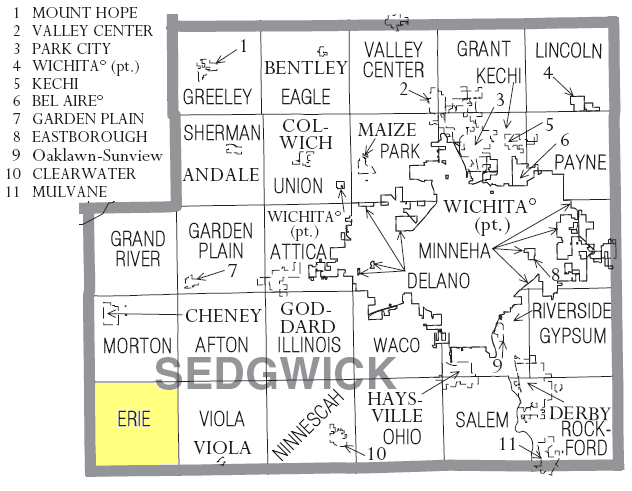
- Location within Sedgwick County

- Location within state of Kansas
- Coordinates: 37°31′05″N 97°45′11″W
- Country: United States
- State: Kansas
- County: Sedgwick

Government
  - District 3 County Commissioner: Stephanie Wise

Area
  - Total: 35.309 sq mi (91.45 km^{2})
  - Land: 35.299 sq mi (91.42 km^{2})
  - Water: 0.01 sq mi (0.026 km^{2}) 0.03%
- Elevation: 1,362 ft (415 m)

Population (2020)
  - Total: 99
  - Density: 2.8/sq mi (1.1/km^{2})
- Time zone: UTC-6 (CST)
  - Summer (DST): UTC-5 (CDT)
- Area code: 316
- FIPS code: 20-21550
- GNIS ID: 474300

Erie Township is a township in Sedgwick County, Kansas, United States. As of the 2020 census, its population was 99.

== History ==
The first settler in Erie Township was Samuel Elkins. The township was originally called Fayette Township but was changed to Erie Township in 1878.

== Geography ==
Erie Township completely surrounds a small exclave of the city of Wichita.

=== Communities ===
- Anness

=== Adjacent townships ===
Morton Township, Sedgwick County
Vinita Township, Kingman County	northwest	north	northeast	Afton Township, Sedgwick County
Allen Township, Kingman County	west	self	east	Viola Township, Sedgwick County
Bennett Township, Kingman County	southwest	south	southeast	Conway Township, Sumner County
Eden Township, Sumner County
