= Morton Township, Sedgwick County, Kansas =

Township in Sedgwick County, Kansas, U.S.

Morton Township Sedgwick County, Kansas
- Township
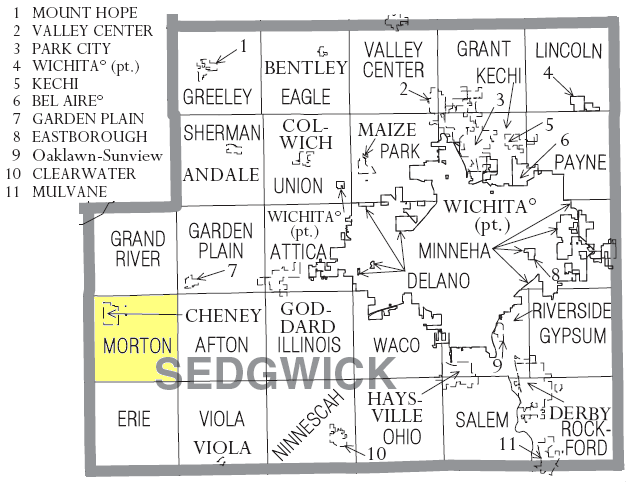
- Location within Sedgwick County

- Location within state of Kansas
- Coordinates: 37°36′15″N 97°45′11″W
- Country: United States
- State: Kansas
- County: Sedgwick
- Founded: 1875

Government
  - District 3 County Commissioner: Stephanie Wise

Area
  - Total: 35.69 sq mi (92.4 km^{2})
  - Land: 35.29 sq mi (91.4 km^{2})
  - Water: 0.4 sq mi (1.0 km^{2})
- Elevation: 1,339 ft (408 m)

Population (2020)
  - Total: 2,812
  - Density: 79.68/sq mi (30.77/km^{2})
- Time zone: UTC-6 (CST)
  - Summer (DST): UTC-5 (CDT)
- Area code: 620
- FIPS code: 20-48550
- GNIS ID: 473982

Morton Township is a township in Sedgwick County, Kansas, United States. As of the 2020 census, its population was 2,812.

== History ==
Morton Township was established in 1875. The first settler in what was to become Morton Township was George W. Walters, who settled there in 1870.

== Geography ==
The North Fork Ninnescah River and South Fork Ninnescah River flow through the township, meeting together to make the Ninnescah River. Mud Creek and Spring Creek also flow through the township.

=== Communities ===
- part of Cheney

=== Adjacent townships ===
Grand River Township, Sedgwick County
Evan Township, Kingman County	northwest	north	northeast	Garden Plain Township, Sedgwick County
Vinita Township, Kingman County	west	self	east	Afton Township, Sedgwick County
Allen Township, Kingman County	southwest	south	southeast	Viola Township, Sedgwick County
Erie Township, Sedgwick County
