= Grand River Township, Kansas =

Township in Sedgwick County, Kansas, U.S.

Grand River Township Sedgwick County, Kansas
- Township
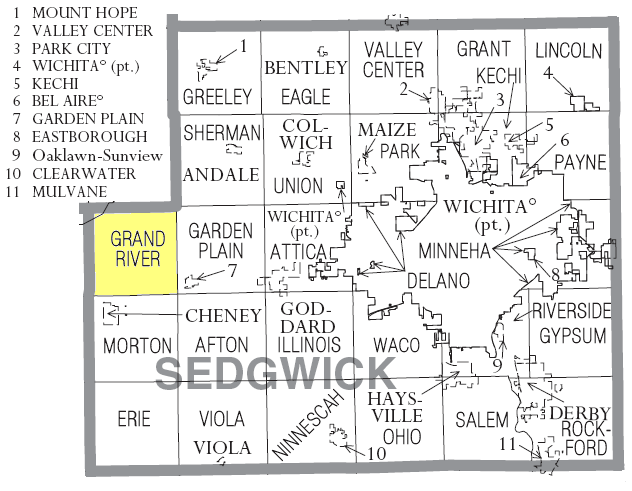
- Location within Sedgwick County

- Location within state of Kansas
- Coordinates: 37°41′30″N 97°45′11″W
- Country: United States
- State: Kansas
- County: Sedgwick
- Founded: 1876

Government
  - District 3 County Commissioner: Stephanie Wise

Area
  - Total: 35.8 sq mi (93 km^{2})
  - Land: 35.1 sq mi (91 km^{2})
  - Water: 0.7 sq mi (1.8 km^{2})
- Elevation: 1,424 ft (434 m)

Population (2020)
  - Total: 682
  - Density: 19.4/sq mi (7.50/km^{2})
- Time zone: UTC-6 (CST)
  - Summer (DST): UTC-5 (CDT)
- Area code: 316
- FIPS code: 20-27300
- GNIS ID: 473981

Grand River Township is a township in Sedgwick County, Kansas, United States. As of the 2020 census, its population was 682.

== History ==
Grand River Township was established in 1876. The first white settler in the township was David Moore.

== Geography ==
Part of Cheney Reservoir lies within the township, and the North Fork Ninnescah River and Spring Creek flow through it as well.

=== Communities ===
- part of Cheney

=== Adjacent townships ===
Sumner Township, Reno County
Ninnescah Township, Reno County	northwest	north	northeast	Sherman Township, Sedgwick County
Evan Township, Kingman County	west	self	east	Garden Plain Township, Sedgwick County
Vinita Township, Kingman County	southwest	south	southeast	Afton Township, Sedgwick County
Morton Township, Sedgwick County

== Transportation ==
=== Major highways ===
- US-54
- US-400
