= Galesburg Township, Kansas =

Galesburg Township
- Township
- Location in Kingman County
- Coordinates: 37°41′25″N 97°58′21″W
- Country: United States
- State: Kansas
- County: Kingman

Area
  - Total: 35.49 sq mi (91.92 km^{2})
  - Land: 35.40 sq mi (91.68 km^{2})
  - Water: 0.093 sq mi (0.24 km^{2}) 0.26%
- Elevation: 1,463 ft (446 m)

Population (2020)
  - Total: 237
  - Density: 6.70/sq mi (2.59/km^{2})
- GNIS feature ID: 0473966

Galesburg Township is a township in Kingman County, Kansas, United States. As of the 2020 census, its population was 237.

== Geography ==
Galesburg Township covers an area of 35.49 square miles (91.92 square kilometers); of this, 0.09 square miles (0.24 square kilometers) or 0.26 percent is water.

=== Communities ===
- Midway
- Waterloo

=== Adjacent townships ===
- Albion Township, Reno County (north)
- Ninnescah Township, Reno County (northeast)
- Evan Township (east)
- Vinita Township (southeast)
- Dale Township (south)
- Ninnescah Township (southwest)
- White Township (west)
- Roscoe Township, Reno County (northwest)

=== Cemeteries ===
The township contains three cemeteries: Lebanon, Saint Louis, and Waterloo.

=== Major highways ===
- U.S. Route 54
- K-17
