= Eagle Township, Kingman County, Kansas =

Eagle Township
- Township
- Location in Kingman County

- Location within the state of Kansas
- Coordinates: 37°38′30″N 97°58′16″W
- Country: United States
- State: Kansas
- County: Kingman

Area
  - Total: 36.39 sq mi (94.24 km^{2})
  - Land: 36.34 sq mi (94.12 km^{2})
  - Water: 0.046 sq mi (0.12 km^{2}) 0.13%
- Elevation: 1,526 ft (465 m)

Population (2020)
  - Total: 112
  - Density: 3.08/sq mi (1.19/km^{2})
- Time zone: UTC-6 (CST)
  - Summer (DST): UTC-5 (CDT)
- GNIS ID: 470418

Eagle Township is a township in Kingman County, Kansas, United States. As of the 2020 census, its population was 112.

== Geography ==
Eagle Township covers an area of 36.39 square miles (94.24 square kilometers); of this, 0.04 square miles (0.12 square kilometers) or 0.13 percent is water.

=== Communities ===
- Belmont
- Orsemus

=== Adjacent townships ===
- Dale Township (north)
- Vinita Township (northeast)
- Allen Township (east)
- Bennett Township (southeast)
- Canton Township (south)
- Valley Township (southwest)
- Richland Township (west)
- Ninnescah Township (northwest)

=== Cemeteries ===
The township contains one cemetery, Greenwood.
