= Richland Township, Kingman County, Kansas =

Richland Township
- Township
- Location in Kingman County
- Coordinates: 37°32′30″N 98°07′46″W
- Country: United States
- State: Kansas
- County: Kingman

Area
  - Total: 36.59 sq mi (94.76 km^{2})
  - Land: 36.52 sq mi (94.59 km^{2})
  - Water: 0.066 sq mi (0.17 km^{2}) 0.18%
- Elevation: 1,598 ft (487 m)

Population (2020)
  - Total: 79
  - Density: 2.2/sq mi (0.84/km^{2})
- GNIS feature ID: 0485459

Richland Township is a township in Kingman County, Kansas, United States. As of the 2020 census, its population was 79.

== Geography ==
Richland Township covers an area of 36.59 square miles (94.76 square kilometers); of this, 0.07 square miles (0.17 square kilometers) or 0.18 percent is water.

=== Communities ===
- Basil
- Cleveland

=== Adjacent townships ===
- Dale Township (northeast)
- Eagle Township (east)
- Canton Township (southeast)
- Valley Township (south)
- Chikaskia Township (southwest)
- Belmont Township (west)
- Ninnescah Township (north and northwest)

=== Cemeteries ===
The township contains one cemetery, Hunt.

=== Major highways ===
- K-14

=== Airports and landing strips ===
- Handkins Landing Strip
