= Kingman Elementary School =

Kingman Elementary School may refer to the following schools in the United States:

- Kingman Elementary School - A public elementary school operated by the Kingman-Norwich USD 331 school district, in Kingman, Kansas
- Kingman Elementary School - A public elementary school operated by the Maine Department of Education, in Kingman, Penobscot County, Maine.
