= Eden Township, Sumner County, Kansas =

Township in Sumner County, Kansas, U.S.

Eden Township
- Township
- Location within Sumner County
- Coordinates: 37.430379°N 97.752065°W
- Country: United States
- State: Kansas
- County: Sumner
- Established: 1878

Government
  - Trustee: Lindsay Hardaway

Area
  - Total: 36.814 sq mi (95.35 km^{2})
  - Land: 36.814 sq mi (95.35 km^{2})
  - Water: 0 sq mi (0 km^{2}) 0%

Population (2020)
  - Total: 420
  - Density: 11/sq mi (4.4/km^{2})
- Time zone: UTC-6 (CST)
  - Summer (DST): UTC-5 (CDT)
- Area code: 620
- GNIS feature ID: 470269

Eden Township is a township in Sumner County, Kansas, United States. As of the 2020 census, its population was 420.

== History ==
Eden Township was established in 1878 from part of Illinois Township.

== Geography ==
Eden Township covers an area of 36.814 square miles (95.35 km^{2}), all of it land. The north branch of State Creek flows through it.

=== Communities ===
- Milton
- part of Conway Springs
- Suppesville

=== Adjacent townships ===
Erie Township, Sedgwick County
Allen Township, Kingman County	northwest	north	northeast	Viola Township, Sedgwick County
Bennett Township, Kingman County	west	self	east	Conway Township, Sumner County
Township 6, Harper County	southwest	south
Creek Township, Sumner County

== Transportation ==
=== Major highways ===
- K-2
- K-42

== Demographics ==
As of the 2020 census, the township had a population of 420, giving a population density of 11 people per square mile (4.2 people/km^{2}). The racial makeup of the township was 94.3% White, 1.2% Native American, 1.0% from some other race, and 3.6% from two or more races. Hispanics or Latinos of any race were 3.3% of the population.

The 2020–2024 American Community Survey estimated that the township contained 150 households and 150 housing units.
