= Murdock, Kansas =

Unincorporated community in Kingman County, Kansas

- CDP
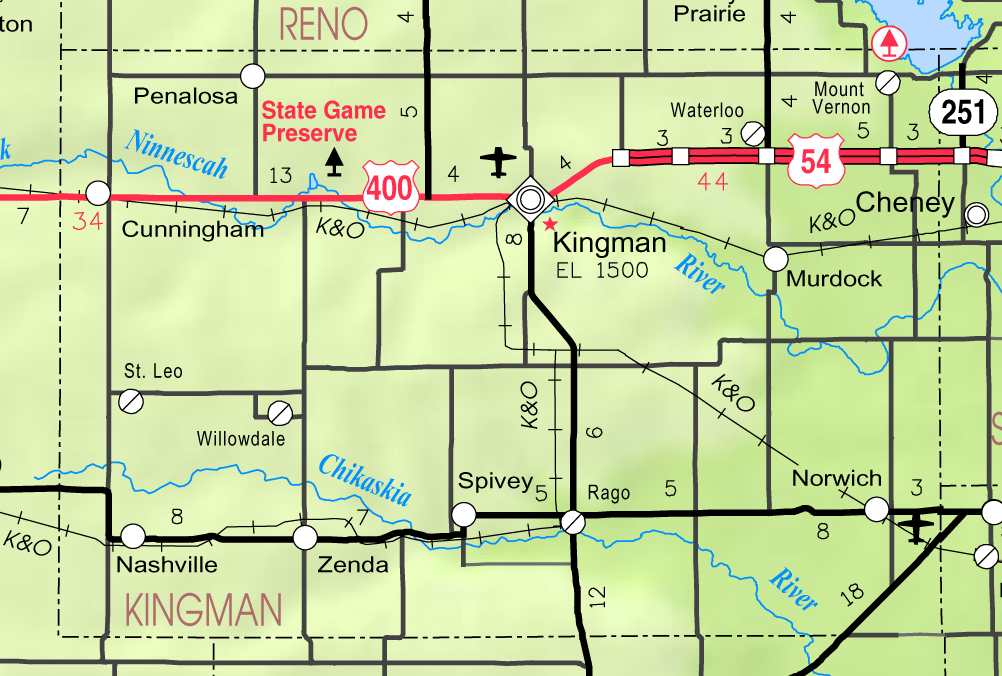
- KDOT map of Kingman County (legend)

- Location within Kansas Location within the United States
- Coordinates: 37°36′40″N 97°55′51″W
- Country: United States
- State: Kansas
- County: Kingman
- Elevation: 1,483 ft (452 m)

Population (2020)
  - Total: 37
- Time zone: UTC-6 (CST)
  - Summer (DST): UTC-5 (CDT)
- ZIP Code: 67111
- Area code: 620
- FIPS code: 20-49250
- GNIS ID: 474291

Murdock is a census-designated place (CDP) in Kingman County, Kansas, United States. As of the 2020 census, the population was 37. It is 10 miles (16 km) east-southeast of Kingman.

== History ==
The post office in Murdock was established in 1884, but it was called New Murdock until 1910.

Murdock has a post office with ZIP Code 67111.

== Demographics ==
Historical population
Census	Pop.	Note	%±
2020	37		—
U.S. Decennial Census

The 2020 United States census counted 37 people, 22 households, and 14 families in Murdock. The population density was 160.9 per square mile (62.1/km^{2}). There were 22 housing units at an average density of 95.7 per square mile (36.9/km^{2}). The racial makeup was 83.78% (31) white or European American (78.38% non-Hispanic white), 5.41% (2) black or African-American, 0.0% (0) Native American or Alaska Native, 0.0% (0) Asian, 0.0% (0) Pacific Islander or Native Hawaiian, 0.0% (0) from other races, and 10.81% (4) from two or more races. Hispanic or Latino of any race was 5.41% (2) of the population.

Of the 22 households, 22.7% had children under the age of 18; 50.0% were married couples living together; 18.2% had a female householder with no spouse or partner present. 36.4% of households consisted of individuals and 22.7% had someone living alone who was 65 years of age or older. The average household size was 1.5 and the average family size was 2.1. The percent of those with a bachelor's degree or higher was estimated to be 0.0% of the population.

8.1% of the population was under the age of 18, 2.7% from 18 to 24, 29.7% from 25 to 44, 27.0% from 45 to 64, and 32.4% who were 65 years of age or older. The median age was 57.5 years. For every 100 females, there were 105.6 males. For every 100 females ages 18 and older, there were 100.0 males.

== Education ==
The community is served by Kingman–Norwich USD 331 public school district.

== Transportation ==
The Atchison, Topeka and Santa Fe Railway formerly provided passenger rail service to Murdock on a line between Wichita and Pratt. Dedicated passenger service was provided until at least 1926, while mixed trains continued until at least 1961. As of 2025, the nearest passenger rail station is located in Hutchinson, where Amtrak's Southwest Chief stops once daily on a route from Chicago to Los Angeles.

== Notable people ==
- Alvin Dewey (1912-1987), special agent of the KBI, who was instrumental in bringing the killers of the Clutter family of Holcomb, Perry Smith and Richard Hickock, to justice
