= Dale Township, Kansas =

Dale Township
- Township
- Location in Kingman County
- Coordinates: 37°36′15″N 97°58′21″W
- Country: United States
- State: Kansas
- County: Kingman

Area
  - Total: 35.4 sq mi (91.6 km^{2})
  - Land: 35.07 sq mi (90.83 km^{2})
  - Water: 0.30 sq mi (0.77 km^{2}) 0.84%
- Elevation: 1,440 ft (439 m)

Population (2020)
  - Total: 135
  - Density: 3.85/sq mi (1.49/km^{2})
- GNIS feature ID: 0485464

Dale Township is a township in Kingman County, Kansas, United States. As of the 2020 census, its population was 135.

== Geography ==
Dale Township covers an area of 35.37 square miles (91.6 square kilometers); of this, 0.3 square miles (0.77 square kilometers) or 0.84 percent is water. The stream of Sand Creek runs through this township.

=== Communities ===
- Georgia
- Murdock

(This list is based on USGS data and may include former settlements.)

=== Adjacent townships ===
- Galesburg Township (north)
- Evan Township (northeast)
- Vinita Township (east)
- Allen Township (southeast)
- Eagle Township (south)
- Richland Township (southwest)
- Ninnescah Township (west)
- White Township (northwest)

=== Cemeteries ===
The township contains two cemeteries: Bethany and Murdock.
