= Chikaskia Township, Kansas =

Chikaskia Township, Kansas may refer to:

- Chikaskia Township, Kingman County, Kansas
- Chikaskia Township, Sumner County, Kansas

== See also ==
- List of Kansas townships
