= Varner, Kansas =

Unincorporated community in Kingman County, Kansas

Coordinates: 37°43′08″N 98°02′11″W

Varner is an unincorporated community in Kingman County, Kansas, United States.

== History ==
A post office was opened in Varner in 1895, and remained in operation until it was discontinued in 1972.

== Education ==
The community is served by Kingman–Norwich USD 331 public school district.

== Transportation ==
The Atchison, Topeka and Santa Fe Railway formerly provided passenger rail service to Varner on a line between Hutchinson and Ponca City. Dedicated passenger service was provided until at least 1954, while mixed trains continued until at least 1961.
