= Smoots Creek =

Stream in Kingman and Reno County, Kansas, U.S.

Coordinates: 37.5744605°N 97.8114414°W

Smoots Creek is a stream in Kingman and Reno counties, Kansas, in the United States.

Smoots Creek was named for Col. S. S. Smoot, a government surveyor.

== See also ==
- List of rivers of Kansas
