= Allen Township, Kingman County, Kansas =

Allen Township Kingman County, Kansas
- Township
- Location within Kingman County

- Location within state of Kansas
- Coordinates: 37°31′05″N 97°51′46″W
- Country: United States
- State: Kansas
- County: Kingman

Area
  - Total: 36.66 sq mi (94.96 km^{2})
  - Land: 36.41 sq mi (94.31 km^{2})
  - Water: 0.25 sq mi (0.65 km^{2}) 0.68%
- Elevation: 1,483 ft (452 m)

Population (2020)
  - Total: 98
  - Density: 2.7/sq mi (1.0/km^{2})
- GNIS feature ID: 0470279

Allen Township is a township in Kingman County, Kansas, United States. As of the 2020 census, its population was 98.

== Geography ==
Allen Township covers an area of 36.67 square miles (94.96 square kilometers); of this, 0.25 square miles (0.65 square kilometers) or 0.68 percent is water. The stream of Coon Creek runs through this township.

=== Adjacent townships ===
- Vinita Township (north)
- Erie Township, Sedgwick County (east)
- Eden Township, Sumner County (southeast)
- Bennett Township (south)
- Canton Township (southwest)
- Eagle Township (west)
- Dale Township (northwest)

=== Cemeteries ===
The township contains one cemetery, Mount Pleasant.
