= Vinita Township, Kansas =

Vinita Township
- Township
- Location in Kingman County
- Coordinates: 37°36′15″N 97°51′46″W
- Country: United States
- State: Kansas
- County: Kingman

Area
  - Total: 35.31 sq mi (91.46 km^{2})
  - Land: 35.08 sq mi (90.85 km^{2})
  - Water: 0.24 sq mi (0.62 km^{2}) 0.68%
- Elevation: 1,391 ft (424 m)

Population (2020)
  - Total: 223
  - Density: 6.36/sq mi (2.45/km^{2})
- GNIS feature ID: 0485527

Vinita Township is a township in Kingman County, Kansas, United States. As of the 2020 census, its population was 223.

== Geography ==
Vinita Township covers an area of 35.31 square miles (91.46 square kilometers); of this, 0.24 square miles (0.62 square kilometers) or 0.68 percent is water. The streams of Fish Creek and Smoots Creek run through this township.

=== Communities ===
- Lansdowne

=== Adjacent townships ===
- Evan Township (north)
- Morton Township, Sedgwick County (east)
- Erie Township, Sedgwick County (southeast)
- Allen Township (south)
- Eagle Township (southwest)
- Dale Township (west)
- Galesburg Township (northwest)

=== Cemeteries ===
The township contains one cemetery, Vinita.
