= Suppesville, Kansas =

Unincorporated community in Sumner County, Kansas

- Unincorporated community
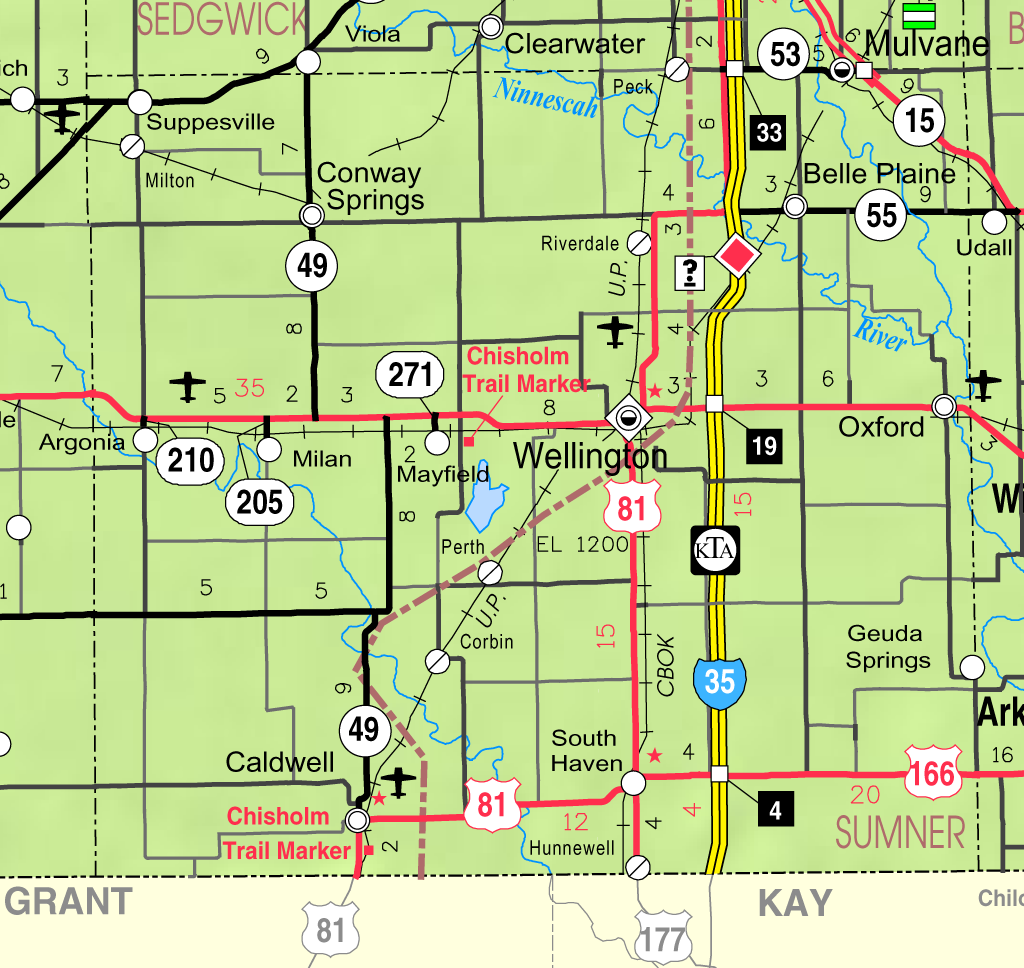
- KDOT map of Sumner County (legend)

- Location within Kansas Location within the United States
- Coordinates: 37°27′34″N 97°46′12″W
- Country: United States
- State: Kansas
- County: Sumner
- Elevation: 1,467 ft (447 m)
- Time zone: UTC-6 (CST)
  - Summer (DST): UTC-5 (CDT)
- Area code: 620
- FIPS code: 20-69510
- GNIS ID: 484929

Suppesville is an unincorporated community in Sumner County, Kansas, United States. It is located about 3.5 miles east of Norwich, or 7.5 miles southwest of Viola, at the intersection of N Argonia Rd and K-42 highway.

== Education ==
The community is served by Kingman–Norwich USD 331 public school district.
