= Anness, Kansas =

Unincorporated community in Sedgwick County, Kansas

Coordinates: 37°28′55″N 97°43′43″W

Anness is an unincorporated community in Sedgwick County, Kansas, United States, about 4.75 miles west of Viola, between W 111th St S and W 119th St S, and between S 327th St W and S 343rd St W.

== History ==
Anness had its start by the building of the Atchison, Topeka and Santa Fe Railway through that territory. The original owner of the site named the town in honor of his wife, Ann S. Wilson.

Anness was founded in the 1880s by WH Wilson, in what is now Sedgwick County. The first post office in Anness was established in February 1887.

== Education ==
The community is served by Kingman–Norwich USD 331 public school district.

== Transportation ==
The Atchison, Topeka and Santa Fe Railway formerly provided passenger rail service to Anness on a line between Wichita and Englewood. Dedicated passenger service was provided until at least 1958, while mixed trains continued until at least 1961. As of 2025, the nearest passenger rail station is located in Hutchinson, where Amtrak's Southwest Chief stops once daily on a route from Chicago to Los Angeles.
