= Ninnescah Township, Kingman County, Kansas =

Ninnescah Township
- Township
- Location in Kingman County
- Coordinates: 37°36′15″N 98°08′11″W
- Country: United States
- State: Kansas
- County: Kingman

Area
  - Total: 69.97 sq mi (181.21 km^{2})
  - Land: 69.47 sq mi (179.93 km^{2})
  - Water: 0.49 sq mi (1.28 km^{2}) 0.71%
- Elevation: 1,611 ft (491 m)

Population (2020)
  - Total: 284
  - Density: 4.09/sq mi (1.58/km^{2})
- GNIS feature ID: 0485461

Ninnescah Township is a township in Kingman County, Kansas, United States. As of the 2020 census, its population was 284.

== Geography ==
Ninnescah Township covers an area of 69.97 square miles (181.21 square kilometers); of this, 0.5 square miles (1.28 square kilometers) or 0.71 percent is water. The township surrounds the southern half of the county seat of Kingman. The streams of Hunter Creek, Negro Creek, Petyt Creek and Wild Run Creek run through this township.

=== Communities ===
- Alameda

=== Adjacent townships ===
- White Township (north)
- Galesburg Township (northeast)
- Dale Township (east)
- Eagle Township (southeast)
- Richland Township (south)
- Belmont Township (south)
- Peters Township (southwest)
- Union Township (west)
- Eureka Township (northwest)
- Hoosier Township (north)

=== Major highways ===
- K-14
