= Cleveland, Kansas =

Unincorporated community in Kingman County, Kansas

- Unincorporated community
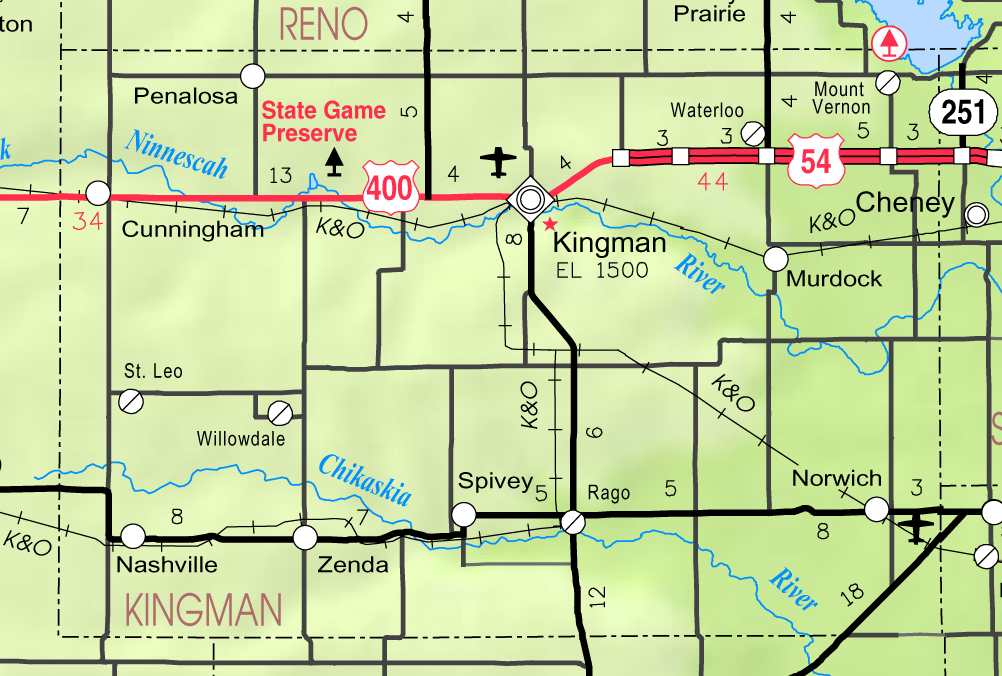
- KDOT map of Kingman County (legend)

- Location within Kansas Location within the United States
- Coordinates: 37°33′06″N 98°08′01″W
- Country: United States
- State: Kansas
- County: Kingman
- Platted: 1879
- Named for: Cleveland, Ohio
- Elevation: 1,634 ft (498 m)
- Time zone: UTC-6 (CST)
  - Summer (DST): UTC-5 (CDT)
- Area code: 620
- GNIS ID: 482725

Cleveland is an unincorporated community in Kingman County, Kansas, United States. It is 6.5 miles (10.5 km) south of Kingman.

== History ==
The community was originally named Carvel. Cleveland was platted and named in 1879, after the city of Cleveland, Ohio. Cleveland was situated at the geographic center of Kingman County, and it hoped to become the county seat, which was located in Kingman at the time. Supported by the backing of the newly established Cleveland Star newspaper, the residents submitted a petition to move the county seat to Cleveland. Kingman won the vote, however, with aid from the town of Dale; the Cleveland Star ultimately moved to Kingman as well, becoming the Kingman Republican. The town had 80 residents as of 1887, and by 1908 contained a school, a church, two grain elevators and would soon have a large hotel. The town declined later, though, and by the 1950s it had only the school, the church, one elevator, and eight homes. The school closed in 1958 followed by the church in 1967. Cleveland now contains only the grain elevator, described by a resident as "one of the busiest elevators in the area", and a few houses.

A post office was opened in Cleveland in 1880, and remained in operation until it was discontinued in 1957.

Cleveland was a station on the Atchison, Topeka and Santa Fe Railway.

== Education ==
The community is served by Kingman–Norwich USD 331 public school district.
