= Evan Township, Kansas =

Evan Township
- Township
- Location in Kingman County
- Coordinates: 37°41′25″N 97°51′41″W
- Country: United States
- State: Kansas
- County: Kingman

Area
  - Total: 36.32 sq mi (94.08 km^{2})
  - Land: 35.05 sq mi (90.79 km^{2})
  - Water: 1.27 sq mi (3.29 km^{2}) 3.5%
- Elevation: 1,493 ft (455 m)

Population (2020)
  - Total: 476
  - Density: 13.6/sq mi (5.24/km^{2})
- GNIS feature ID: 0473973

Evan Township is a township in Kingman County, Kansas, United States. As of the 2020 census, its population was 476.

== Geography ==
Evan Township covers an area of 36.33 square miles (94.08 square kilometers); of this, 1.27 square miles (3.29 square kilometers) or 3.5 percent is water.

=== Communities ===
- Mount Vernon

(This list is based on USGS data and may include former settlements.)

=== Adjacent townships ===
- Ninnescah Township, Reno County (north)
- Sumner Township, Reno County (northeast)
- Grand River Township, Sedgwick County (east)
- Morton Township, Sedgwick County (southeast)
- Vinita Township (south)
- Dale Township (southwest)
- Galesburg Township (west)
- Albion Township, Reno County (northwest)

=== Cemeteries ===
The township contains one cemetery, Mount Vernon.

=== Major highways ===
- U.S. Route 54
