= Agnes Leist Beebe =

American singer

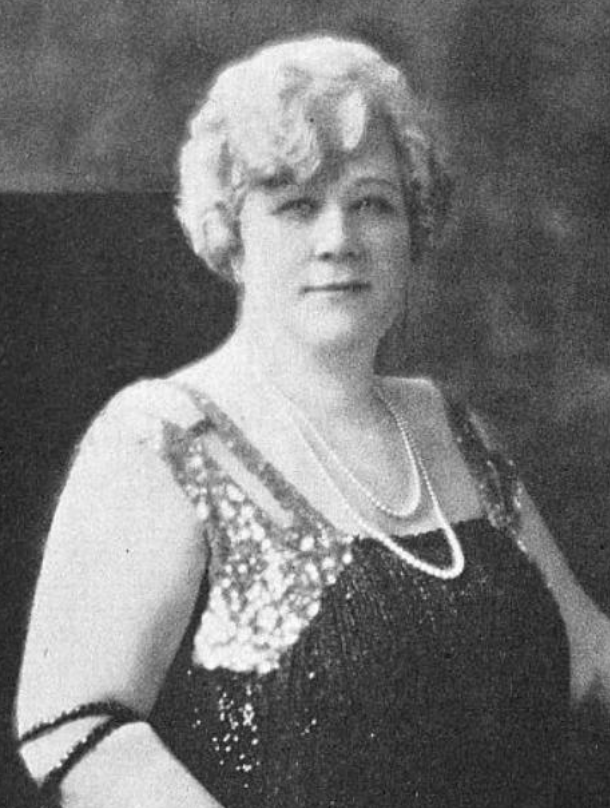
- Agnes Leist Beebe, from a 1927 publication
- Born: Agnes Garlinda Leist; December 13, 1874; Shelbyville, Illinois, U.S.
- Died: August 30, 1941 (age 66); Miami, Florida, U.S.
- Occupation(s): Singer, teacher

Agnes Garlinda Leist Beebe (December 13, 1874 – August 30, 1941) was an American singer and voice teacher, based in Chicago and Miami.

== Early life and education ==
Agnes Leist was born in Shelbyville, Illinois and raised in Kingman, Kansas, the daughter of Simon Leist and Mary E. Bugh Leist. She graduated from the Arey Conservatory of Music.

== Career ==
Beebe lived in Wichita as a young woman, and toured the lyceum circuit as a singer. She was a noted singer and voice teacher based in Chicago and Miami. As a soprano, she sang in operas, at concerts and community events, and as an oratorio soloist. She taught at the Wichita Conservatory and at the Girvin Institute of Musical Art. She taught large weekly classes of voice students, Some of her students became professional singers themselves.

== Personal life ==
Leist married Canadian-born piano tuner George Lansing Beebe in 1894, in Kansas. They had a son, and lived in Miami part-time until the late 20s, when they moved to Miami permanently. She died in 1941, at the age of 66, in Miami.
