= Spivey, Kansas =

City in Kingman County, Kansas

- City
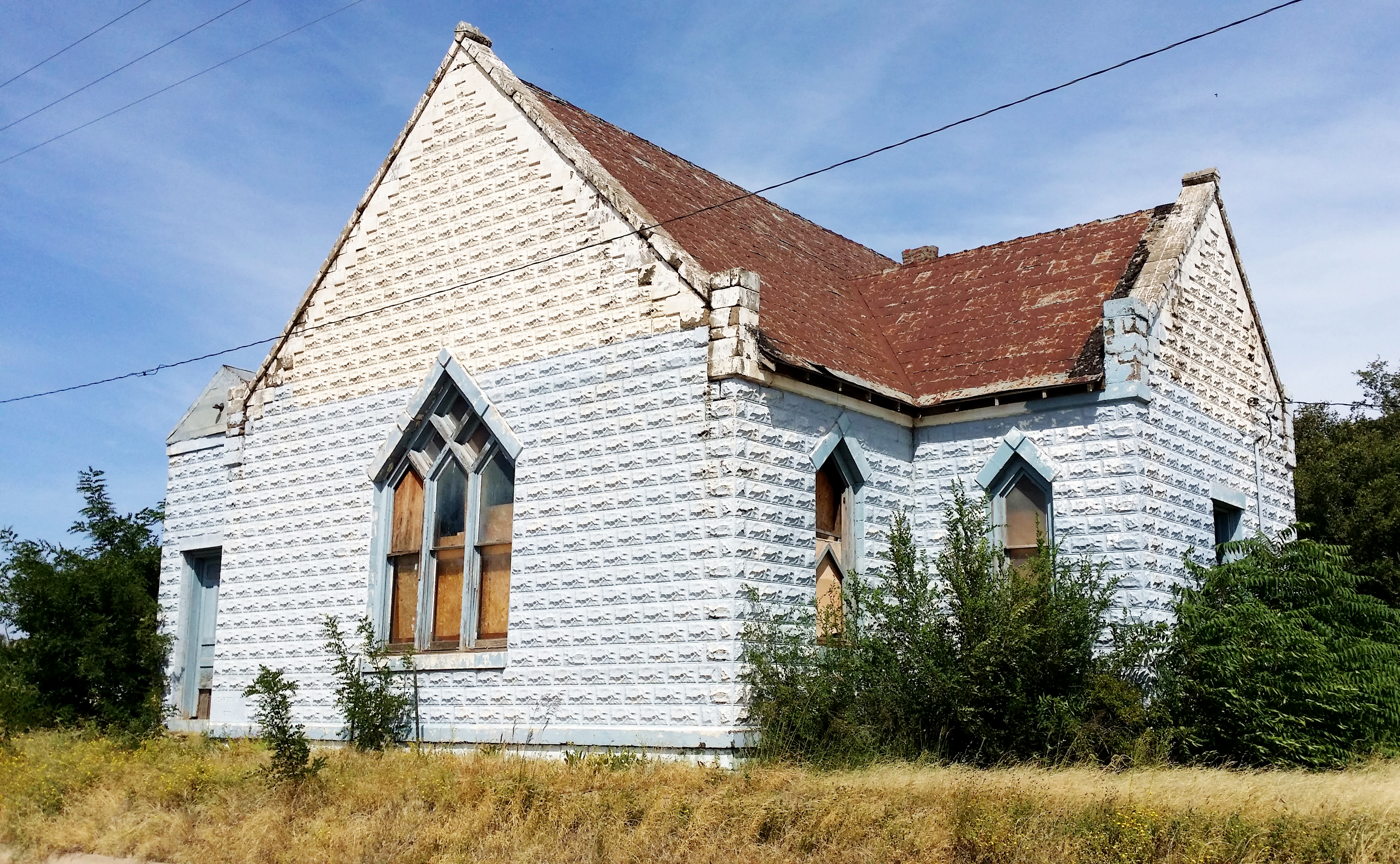
- Former Spivey Christian Church (2015)

- Location within Kingman County and Kansas

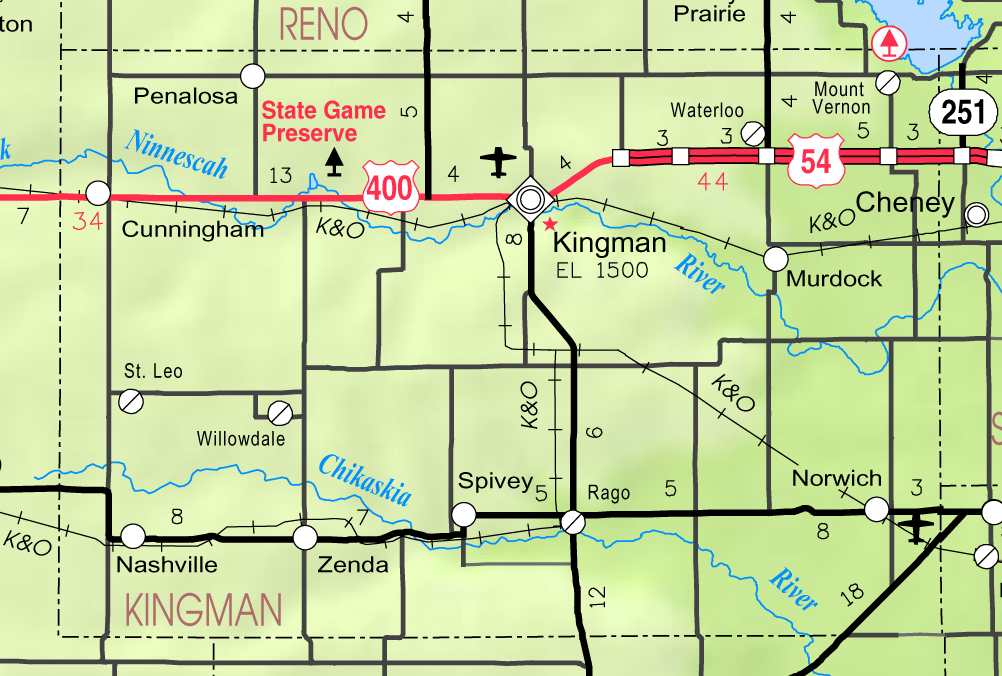
- KDOT map of Kingman County (legend)
- Coordinates: 37°26′45″N 98°09′48.2″W
- Country: United States
- State: Kansas
- County: Kingman
- Founded: 1880s
- Incorporated: 1887
- Named for: Col. E.M. Spivey

Area
  - Total: 0.52 sq mi (1.35 km^{2})
  - Land: 0.52 sq mi (1.35 km^{2})
  - Water: 0 sq mi (0.00 km^{2})
- Elevation: 1,509 ft (460 m)

Population (2020)
  - Total: 61
  - Density: 120/sq mi (45/km^{2})
- Time zone: UTC-6 (CST)
  - Summer (DST): UTC-5 (CDT)
- ZIP Code: 67142
- Area code: 620
- FIPS code: 20-67250
- GNIS ID: 470401

Spivey is a city in Kingman County, Kansas, United States. As of the 2020 census, the population of the city was 61.

== History ==
Spivey is the name of Col. E.M. Spivey, member of the town company. Spivey has had a post office since 1886.

== Geography ==
According to the United States Census Bureau, the city has a total area of 0.52 square miles (1.35 km^{2}), all land.

== Demographics ==
Historical population
Census	Pop.	Note	%±
1890	205		—
1900	134		−34.6%
1910	252		88.1%
1920	226		−10.3%
1930	219		−3.1%
1940	181		−17.4%
1950	109		−39.8%
1960	98		−10.1%
1970	78		−20.4%
1980	83		6.4%
1990	88		6.0%
2000	80		−9.1%
2010	78		−2.5%
2020	61		−21.8%
U.S. Decennial Census

=== 2010 census ===
As of the census of 2010, there were 78 people, 37 households, and 25 families living in the city. The population density was 150.0 inhabitants per square mile (57.9/km^{2}). There were 48 housing units at an average density of 92.3 per square mile (35.6/km^{2}). The racial makeup of the city was 96.2% White and 3.8% Native American. Hispanic or Latino of any race were 12.8% of the population.

There were 37 households, of which 18.9% had children under the age of 18 living with them, 40.5% were married couples living together, 18.9% had a female householder with no husband present, 8.1% had a male householder with no wife present, and 32.4% were non-families. 32.4% of all households were made up of individuals, and 21.6% had someone living alone who was 65 years of age or older. The average household size was 2.11 and the average family size was 2.56.

The median age in the city was 51.5 years. 17.9% of residents were under the age of 18; 1.3% were between the ages of 18 and 24; 21.7% were from 25 to 44; 30.8% were from 45 to 64; and 28.2% were 65 years of age or older. The gender makeup of the city was 50.0% male and 50.0% female.

=== 2000 census ===
As of the census of 2000, there were 80 people, 37 households, and 25 families living in the city. The population density was 153.8 inhabitants per square mile (59.4/km^{2}). There were 49 housing units at an average density of 94.2 per square mile (36.4/km^{2}). The racial makeup of the city was 100.00% White. Hispanic or Latino of any race were 5.00% of the population.

There were 37 households, out of which 27.0% had children under the age of 18 living with them, 56.8% were married couples living together, 5.4% had a female householder with no husband present, and 32.4% were non-families. 32.4% of all households were made up of individuals, and 5.4% had someone living alone who was 65 years of age or older. The average household size was 2.16 and the average family size was 2.72.

In the city, the population was spread out, with 25.0% under the age of 18, 5.0% from 18 to 24, 31.3% from 25 to 44, 23.8% from 45 to 64, and 15.0% who were 65 years of age or older. The median age was 40 years. For every 100 females, there were 128.6 males. For every 100 females age 18 and over, there were 122.2 males.

The median income for a household in the city was $37,250, and the median income for a family was $38,125. Males had a median income of $40,625 versus $6,250 for females. The per capita income for the city was $23,849. There were 4.8% of families and 6.6% of the population living below the poverty line, including no under eighteens and 15.0% of those over 64.

== Education ==
The community is served by Kingman–Norwich USD 331 public school district.

== Transportation ==
The Atchison, Topeka and Santa Fe Railway formerly provided passenger rail service to Spivey on a line between Wichita and Englewood. Dedicated passenger service was provided until at least 1958, while mixed trains continued until at least 1961. As of 2025, the nearest passenger rail station is located in Hutchinson, where Amtrak's Southwest Chief stops once daily on a route from Chicago to Los Angeles.
