= Kingman County, Kansas =

County in Kansas, United States

- County
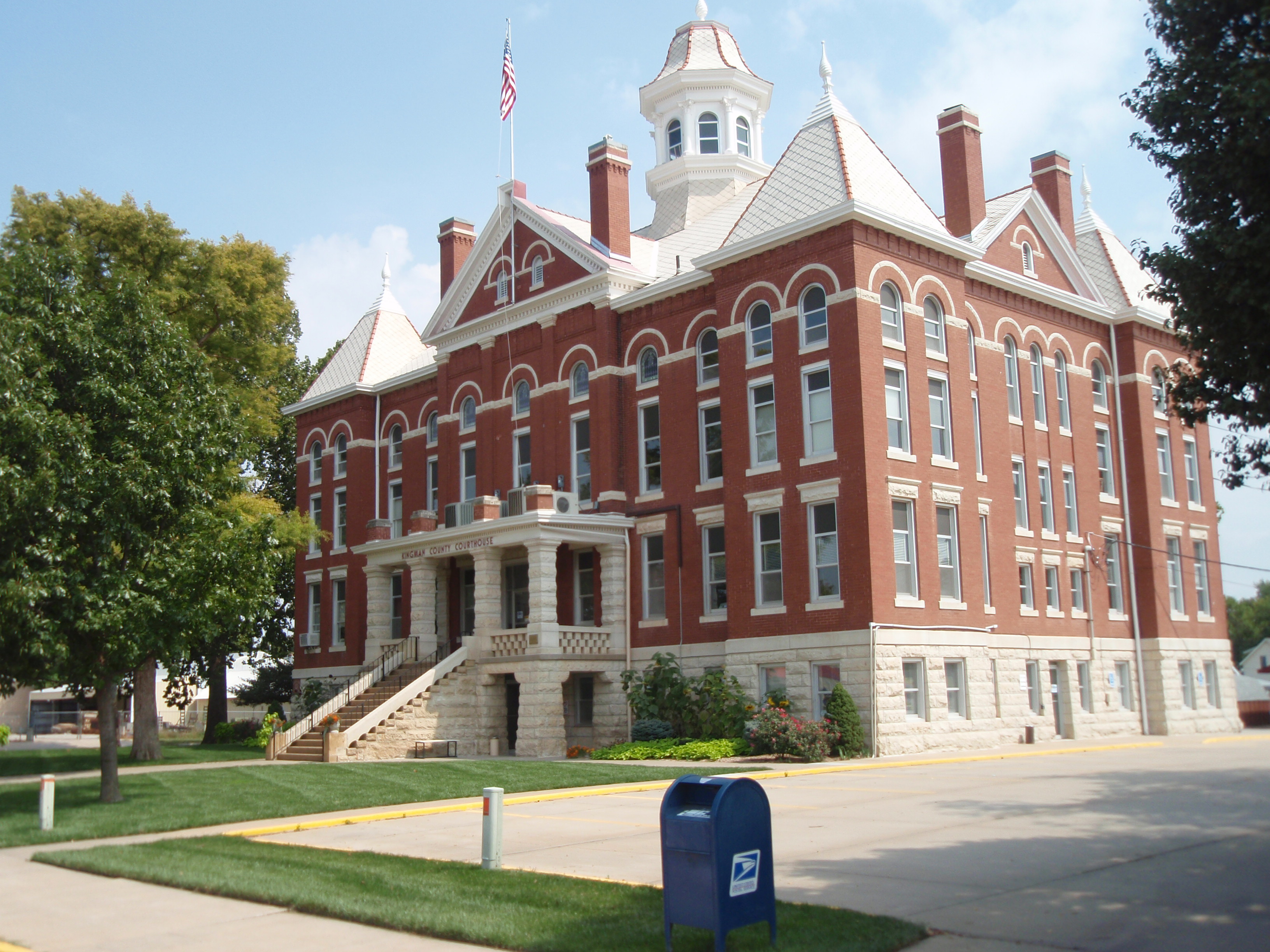
- Kingman County Courthouse in Kingman (2009)

- Location within the U.S. state of Kansas
- Coordinates: 37°31′14″N 97°52′18″W
- Country: United States
- State: Kansas
- Founded: March 7, 1872
- Named for: Samuel Austin Kingman
- Seat: Kingman
- Largest city: Kingman

Area
  - Total: 867 sq mi (2,250 km^{2})
  - Land: 863 sq mi (2,240 km^{2})
  - Water: 3.3 sq mi (8.5 km^{2}) 0.4%

Population (2020)
  - Total: 7,470
  - Estimate (2025): 7,029 ▼
  - Density: 8.7/sq mi (3.4/km^{2})
- Time zone: UTC−6 (Central)
  - Summer (DST): UTC−5 (CDT)
- Congressional district: 4th
- Website: kingmancoks.org

Kingman County is a county located in the U.S. state of Kansas. Its county seat and largest city is Kingman. As of the 2020 census, the county population was 7,470. The county was named for Samuel Kingman, chief justice of the Kansas Supreme Court during the 1860s and 1870s.

== History ==
=== Early history ===
For many millennia, the Great Plains of North America was inhabited by nomadic Native Americans. From the 16th century to 18th century, the Kingdom of France claimed ownership of large parts of North America. In 1762, after the French and Indian War, France secretly ceded New France to Spain, per the Treaty of Fontainebleau.

=== 19th century ===
In 1802, Spain returned most of the land to France, but keeping title to about 7,500 square miles. In 1803, most of the land for modern day Kansas was acquired by the United States from France as part of the 828,000 square mile Louisiana Purchase for 2.83 cents per acre.

In 1854, the Kansas Territory was organized, then in 1861 Kansas became the 34th U.S. state. In 1872, Kingman County was established and named for Samuel A. Kingman, chief justice of the Kansas Supreme Court.

== Geography ==
According to the U.S. Census Bureau, the county has a total area of 867 square miles (2,250 km^{2}), of which 863 square miles (2,240 km^{2}) is land and 3.3 square miles (8.5 km^{2}) (0.4%) is water.

=== Adjacent counties ===
- Reno County (north)
- Sedgwick County (east)
- Sumner County (southeast)
- Harper County (south)
- Barber County (southwest)
- Pratt County (west)

== Demographics ==
Historical population
| Census | Pop. | Note | %± |
|---|---|---|---|
| 1880 | 3,713 | | — |
| 1890 | 11,823 | | 218.4% |
| 1900 | 10,663 | | −9.8% |
| 1910 | 13,386 | | 25.5% |
| 1920 | 12,119 | | −9.5% |
| 1930 | 11,674 | | −3.7% |
| 1940 | 12,001 | | 2.8% |
| 1950 | 10,324 | | −14.0% |
| 1960 | 9,958 | | −3.5% |
| 1970 | 8,886 | | −10.8% |
| 1980 | 8,960 | | 0.8% |
| 1990 | 8,292 | | −7.5% |
| 2000 | 8,673 | | 4.6% |
| 2010 | 7,858 | | −9.4% |
| 2020 | 7,470 | | −4.9% |
| 2025 (est.) | 7,029 | ▼ | −5.9% |
U.S. Decennial Census; 1790-1960 1900-1990; 1990-2000 2010-2020

=== Racial and ethnic composition ===
Kingman County, Kansas – Racial and ethnic composition Note: the US Census treats Hispanic/Latino as an ethnic category. This table excludes Latinos from the racial categories and assigns them to a separate category. Hispanics/Latinos may be of any race.
| Race / Ethnicity (NH = Non-Hispanic) | Pop 1980 | Pop 1990 | Pop 2000 | Pop 2010 | Pop 2020 | % 1980 | % 1990 | % 2000 | % 2010 | % 2020 |
|---|---|---|---|---|---|---|---|---|---|---|
| White alone (NH) | 8,835 | 8,172 | 8,368 | 7,486 | 6,829 | 98.60% | 98.55% | 96.48% | 95.27% | 91.42% |
| Black or African American alone (NH) | 3 | 9 | 17 | 13 | 28 | 0.03% | 0.11% | 0.20% | 0.17% | 0.37% |
| Native American or Alaska Native alone (NH) | 15 | 24 | 45 | 38 | 27 | 0.17% | 0.29% | 0.52% | 0.48% | 0.36% |
| Asian alone (NH) | 16 | 10 | 20 | 36 | 33 | 0.18% | 0.12% | 0.23% | 0.46% | 0.44% |
| Native Hawaiian or Pacific Islander alone (NH) | x | x | 2 | 2 | 4 | x | x | 0.02% | 0.03% | 0.05% |
| Other race alone (NH) | 7 | 0 | 2 | 0 | 16 | 0.08% | 0.00% | 0.02% | 0.00% | 0.21% |
| Mixed race or Multiracial (NH) | x | x | 94 | 84 | 265 | x | x | 1.08% | 1.07% | 3.55% |
| Hispanic or Latino (any race) | 84 | 77 | 125 | 199 | 268 | 0.94% | 0.93% | 1.44% | 2.53% | 3.59% |
| Total | 8,960 | 8,292 | 8,673 | 7,858 | 7,470 | 100.00% | 100.00% | 100.00% | 100.00% | 100.00% |

=== 2020 census ===
As of the 2020 census, the county had a population of 7,470. The median age was 45.8 years. 22.4% of residents were under the age of 18 and 22.7% of residents were 65 years of age or older. For every 100 females there were 103.4 males, and for every 100 females age 18 and over there were 101.5 males age 18 and over. 0.0% of residents lived in urban areas, while 100.0% lived in rural areas.

The racial makeup of the county was 92.7% White, 0.5% Black or African American, 0.5% American Indian and Alaska Native, 0.5% Asian, 0.1% Native Hawaiian and Pacific Islander, 1.3% from some other race, and 4.5% from two or more races. Hispanic or Latino residents of any race comprised 3.6% of the population.

There were 3,155 households in the county, of which 27.1% had children under the age of 18 living with them and 21.3% had a female householder with no spouse or partner present. About 30.5% of all households were made up of individuals and 16.1% had someone living alone who was 65 years of age or older.

There were 3,647 housing units, of which 13.5% were vacant. Among occupied housing units, 74.4% were owner-occupied and 25.6% were renter-occupied. The homeowner vacancy rate was 1.7% and the rental vacancy rate was 9.8%.

=== 2000 census ===
As of the 2000 census, there were 8,673 people, 3,371 households, and 2,420 families residing in the county. The population density was 10 inhabitants per square mile (3.9/km^{2}). There were 3,852 housing units at an average density of 4 per square mile (1.5/km^{2}). The racial makeup of the county was 97.45% White, 0.21% Black or African American, 0.58% Native American, 0.24% Asian, 0.02% Pacific Islander, 0.35% from other races, and 1.15% from two or more races. 1.44% of the population were Hispanic or Latino of any race.

There were 3,371 households, out of which 32.40% had children under the age of 18 living with them, 61.90% were married couples living together, 7.10% had a female householder with no husband present, and 28.20% were non-families. 26.00% of all households were made up of individuals, and 13.80% had someone living alone who was 65 years of age or older. The average household size was 2.51 and the average family size was 3.03.

In the county, the population was spread out, with 27.40% under the age of 18, 5.80% from 18 to 24, 24.70% from 25 to 44, 22.50% from 45 to 64, and 19.60% who were 65 years of age or older. The median age was 40 years. For every 100 females there were 96.30 males. For every 100 females age 18 and over, there were 93.50 males.

The median income for a household in the county was $37,790, and the median income for a family was $44,547. Males had a median income of $31,771 versus $25,298 for females. The per capita income for the county was $18,533. About 8.40% of families and 10.60% of the population were below the poverty line, including 16.90% of those under age 18 and 7.40% of those age 65 or over.

== Government ==
=== Presidential elections ===
Presidential election results

United States presidential election results for Kingman County, Kansas
| Year | Republican | | Democratic | | Third party(ies) | |
| Year | No. | % | No. | % | No. | % |
|---|---|---|---|---|---|---|
| 1888 | 1,413 | 50.20% | 622 | 22.10% | 780 | 27.71% |
| 1892 | 1,225 | 43.12% | 0 | 0.00% | 1,616 | 56.88% |
| 1896 | 988 | 40.89% | 1,393 | 57.66% | 35 | 1.45% |
| 1900 | 1,286 | 50.79% | 1,183 | 46.72% | 63 | 2.49% |
| 1904 | 1,600 | 63.19% | 661 | 26.11% | 271 | 10.70% |
| 1908 | 1,442 | 47.26% | 1,479 | 48.48% | 130 | 4.26% |
| 1912 | 336 | 10.96% | 1,421 | 46.35% | 1,309 | 42.69% |
| 1916 | 1,891 | 38.26% | 2,626 | 53.13% | 426 | 8.62% |
| 1920 | 2,818 | 63.18% | 1,557 | 34.91% | 85 | 1.91% |
| 1924 | 2,416 | 54.33% | 1,077 | 24.22% | 954 | 21.45% |
| 1928 | 3,287 | 69.63% | 1,408 | 29.82% | 26 | 0.55% |
| 1932 | 1,923 | 37.97% | 3,050 | 60.22% | 92 | 1.82% |
| 1936 | 2,014 | 35.14% | 3,705 | 64.64% | 13 | 0.23% |
| 1940 | 3,068 | 54.35% | 2,528 | 44.78% | 49 | 0.87% |
| 1944 | 2,827 | 63.74% | 1,579 | 35.60% | 29 | 0.65% |
| 1948 | 2,640 | 55.88% | 2,008 | 42.51% | 76 | 1.61% |
| 1952 | 3,820 | 76.52% | 1,096 | 21.96% | 76 | 1.52% |
| 1956 | 3,226 | 69.08% | 1,428 | 30.58% | 16 | 0.34% |
| 1960 | 2,904 | 62.29% | 1,735 | 37.22% | 23 | 0.49% |
| 1964 | 1,917 | 45.92% | 2,226 | 53.32% | 32 | 0.77% |
| 1968 | 2,318 | 60.29% | 1,201 | 31.24% | 326 | 8.48% |
| 1972 | 2,756 | 68.90% | 1,107 | 27.68% | 137 | 3.43% |
| 1976 | 1,839 | 44.93% | 2,142 | 52.33% | 112 | 2.74% |
| 1980 | 2,610 | 63.63% | 1,133 | 27.62% | 359 | 8.75% |
| 1984 | 2,826 | 72.04% | 1,047 | 26.69% | 50 | 1.27% |
| 1988 | 2,205 | 58.74% | 1,420 | 37.83% | 129 | 3.44% |
| 1992 | 1,680 | 40.36% | 1,100 | 26.42% | 1,383 | 33.22% |
| 1996 | 2,659 | 64.65% | 1,006 | 24.46% | 448 | 10.89% |
| 2000 | 2,672 | 70.17% | 991 | 26.02% | 145 | 3.81% |
| 2004 | 2,801 | 74.42% | 904 | 24.02% | 59 | 1.57% |
| 2008 | 2,603 | 71.04% | 963 | 26.28% | 98 | 2.67% |
| 2012 | 2,397 | 74.19% | 733 | 22.69% | 101 | 3.13% |
| 2016 | 2,530 | 75.88% | 599 | 17.97% | 205 | 6.15% |
| 2020 | 3,130 | 79.26% | 752 | 19.04% | 67 | 1.70% |
| 2024 | 3,119 | 79.02% | 753 | 19.08% | 75 | 1.90% |

=== Laws ===
Following amendment to the Kansas Constitution in 1986, the county remained a prohibition, or "dry", county until 2004, when voters approved the sale of alcoholic liquor by the individual drink with a 30 percent food sales requirement.

== Education ==
=== Unified school districts ===
- Kingman–Norwich USD 331
- Cunningham–West Kingman County USD 332

== Communities ==
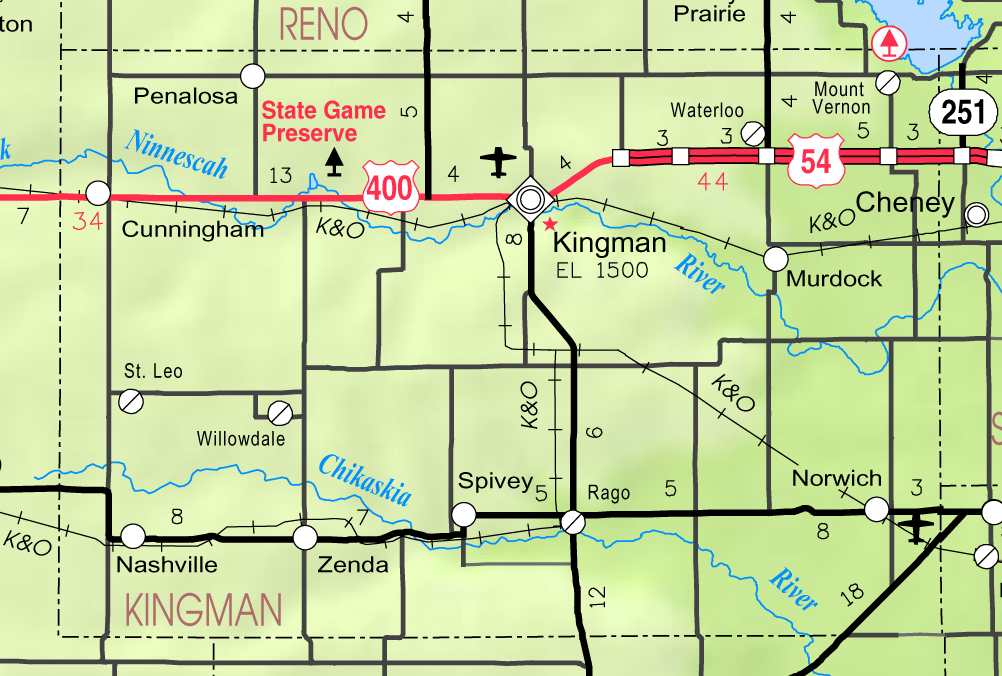
2005 map of Kingman County (map legend)

List of townships / incorporated cities / unincorporated communities / extinct former communities within Kingman County.

=== Cities ===
- Cunningham
- Kingman (county seat)
- Nashville
- Norwich
- Penalosa
- Spivey
- Zenda

=== Unincorporated communities ===
† means a community is designated a Census-Designated Place (CDP) by the United States Census Bureau.

- Adams (between Rago & Norwich)
- Belmont (between Kingman & Norwich)
- Calista
- Cleveland
- Mount Vernon
- Murdock†
- Rago
- Skellyville
- St. Leo
- Varner
- Waterloo
- Willowdale

=== Townships ===
Kingman County is divided into twenty-three townships. The city of Kingman is considered governmentally independent and is excluded from the census figures for the townships. In the following table, the population center is the largest city (or cities) included in that township's population total, if it is of a significant size.

Sources: 2000 U.S. Gazetteer from the U.S. Census Bureau.
| Township | FIPS | Population center | Population | Population density /km^{2} (/sq mi) | Land area km^{2} (sq mi) | Water area km^{2} (sq mi) | Water % | Geographic coordinates |
|---|---|---|---|---|---|---|---|---|
| Allen | 01250 | | 109 | 1 (3) | 94 (36) | 1 (0) | 0.69% | 37°31′15″N 97°52′19″W |
| Belmont | 05675 | | 92 | 1 (3) | 95 (37) | 0 (0) | 0.05% | 37°30′48″N 98°11′51″W |
| Bennett | 06050 | | 705 | 7 (19) | 95 (36) | 0 (0) | 0% | 37°26′58″N 97°50′54″W |
| Canton | 10450 | | 118 | 1 (3) | 94 (36) | 0 (0) | 0.04% | 37°24′27″N 97°58′47″W |
| Chikaskia | 13125 | | 140 | 1 (4) | 94 (36) | 0 (0) | 0.01% | 37°26′25″N 98°10′56″W |
| Dale | 16925 | | 203 | 2 (6) | 91 (35) | 1 (0) | 0.84% | 37°36′45″N 97°57′52″W |
| Dresden | 18650 | | 385 | 4 (11) | 93 (36) | 0 (0) | 0.21% | 37°40′8″N 98°25′25″W |
| Eagle | 19225 | | 154 | 2 (4) | 94 (36) | 0 (0) | 0.12% | 37°31′3″N 97°58′21″W |
| Eureka | 21850 | | 123 | 1 (3) | 93 (36) | 1 (0) | 0.67% | 37°40′58″N 98°17′39″W |
| Evan | 22000 | | 516 | 6 (15) | 91 (35) | 3 (1) | 3.50% | 37°41′59″N 97°51′12″W |
| Galesburg | 25125 | | 254 | 3 (7) | 92 (35) | 0 (0) | 0.26% | 37°41′29″N 97°58′7″W |
| Hoosier | 33050 | | 162 | 2 (4) | 94 (36) | 0 (0) | 0.02% | 37°41′7″N 98°11′43″W |
| Kingman | 36975 | | 124 | 1 (3) | 93 (36) | 0 (0) | 0.02% | 37°31′19″N 98°24′4″W |
| Liberty | 40150 | | 178 | 2 (5) | 94 (36) | 0 (0) | 0.05% | 37°25′52″N 98°25′25″W |
| Ninnescah | 50650 | | 313 | 2 (5) | 180 (69) | 1 (0) | 0.71% | 37°36′31″N 98°7′20″W |
| Peters | 55550 | | 201 | 2 (6) | 93 (36) | 0 (0) | 0.02% | 37°30′48″N 98°18′28″W |
| Richland | 59400 | | 100 | 1 (3) | 95 (37) | 0 (0) | 0.18% | 37°31′35″N 98°5′2″W |
| Rochester | 60375 | | 210 | 2 (6) | 94 (36) | 0 (0) | 0.09% | 37°26′8″N 98°17′33″W |
| Rural | 61725 | | 359 | 4 (10) | 94 (36) | 0 (0) | 0.03% | 37°37′29″N 98°25′11″W |
| Union | 72175 | | 88 | 1 (2) | 94 (36) | 0 (0) | 0.25% | 37°36′32″N 98°18′43″W |
| Valley | 72850 | | 102 | 1 (3) | 94 (36) | 0 (0) | 0.15% | 37°26′13″N 98°4′8″W |
| Vinita | 73975 | | 249 | 3 (7) | 91 (35) | 1 (0) | 0.67% | 37°36′32″N 97°51′44″W |
| White | 77775 | | 401 | 5 (12) | 87 (34) | 0 (0) | 0% | 37°41′30″N 98°4′49″W |

== See also ==
- National Register of Historic Places listings in Kingman County, Kansas

Community information for Kansas

- Kansas locations by per capita income
- List of counties in Kansas
- List of townships in Kansas
- List of cities in Kansas
- List of unincorporated communities in Kansas
- List of ghost towns in Kansas
