= Waterloo, Kansas =

Unincorporated community in Kingman County, Kansas

Coordinates: 37°40′37″N 97°56′27″W

Waterloo is an unincorporated community in Kingman County, Kansas, United States.

== History ==
The post office in Waterloo closed in 1912.

== Education ==
The community is served by Kingman–Norwich USD 331 public school district.
