= Belmont Township, Kingman County, Kansas =

Belmont Township
- Township
- Location in Kingman County
- Coordinates: 37°29′15″N 98°11′31″W
- Country: United States
- State: Kansas
- County: Kingman

Area
  - Total: 36.75 sq mi (95.19 km^{2})
  - Land: 36.73 sq mi (95.14 km^{2})
  - Water: 0.019 sq mi (0.05 km^{2}) 0.05%
- Elevation: 1,565 ft (477 m)

Population (2020)
  - Total: 57
  - Density: 1.6/sq mi (0.60/km^{2})
- GNIS feature ID: 0470409

Belmont Township is a township in Kingman County, Kansas, United States. As of the 2020 census, its population was 57.

== Geography ==
Belmont Township covers an area of 36.75 square miles (95.19 square kilometers); of this, 0.02 square miles (0.05 square kilometers) or 0.05 percent is water.

=== Adjacent townships ===
- Ninnescah Township (north and northeast)
- Richland Township (east)
- Valley Township (southeast)
- Chikaskia Township (south)
- Rochester Township (southwest)
- Peters Township (west)
- Union Township (northwest)

=== Cemeteries ===
The township contains one cemetery, Cleveland.
