= Rago, Kansas =

Unincorporated community in Kingman County, Kansas

- Unincorporated community
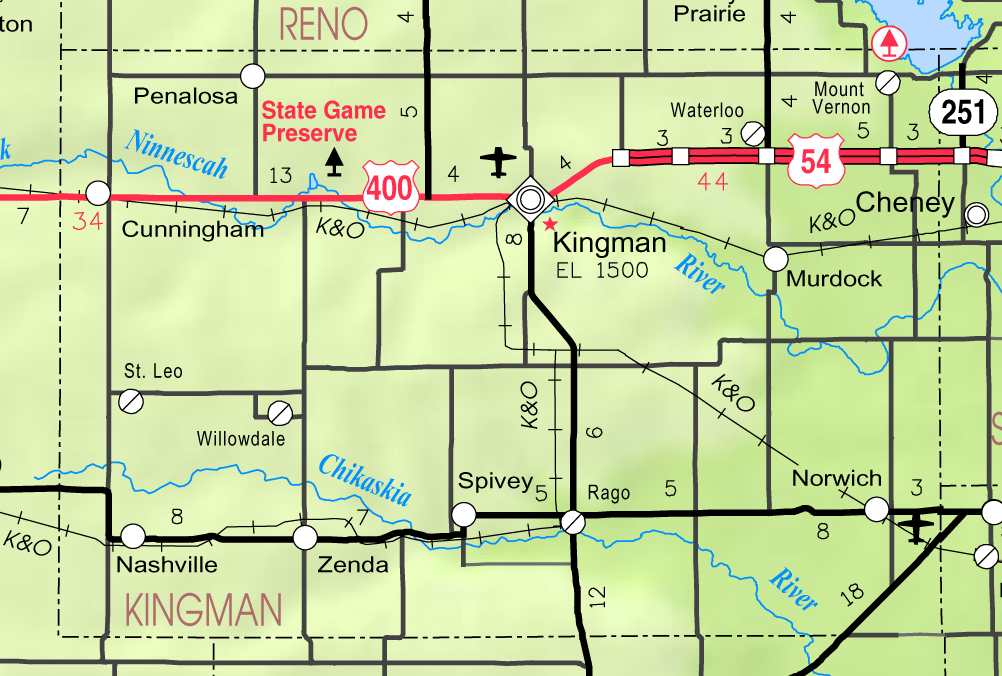
- KDOT map of Kingman County (legend)

- Location within Kansas Location within the United States
- Coordinates: 37°27′10″N 98°4′54″W
- Country: United States
- State: Kansas
- County: Kingman
- Elevation: 1,457 ft (444 m)
- Time zone: UTC-6 (CST)
  - Summer (DST): UTC-5 (CDT)
- Area code: 620
- FIPS code: 20-58350
- GNIS ID: 470413

Rago is an unincorporated community in Kingman County, Kansas, United States.

== Education ==
The community is served by Kingman–Norwich USD 331 public school district.

== Transportation ==
The Atchison, Topeka and Santa Fe Railway formerly provided passenger rail service to Rago. The depot served as a junction point. On the line between Wichita and Englewood, dedicated passenger service was provided until at least 1958, while mixed trains continued until at least 1961. On the line between Hutchinson and Ponca City, dedicated passenger service was provided until at least 1954, while mixed trains continued until at least 1961. As of 2025, the nearest passenger rail station is located in Hutchinson, where Amtrak's Southwest Chief stops once daily on a route from Chicago to Los Angeles.

== Notable people ==
Rago was the hometown of Clyde Vernon Cessna, original founder of Cessna Aircraft.
