= Adams, Kansas =

Extinct town in Kingman County, Kansas

Coordinates: 37°27′31.06″N 97°58′39.21″W

Adams is an unincorporated community in Kingman County, Kansas, United States. Its population was previously estimated at 20 inhabitants.

== History ==
Adams had a post office from 1865 to 1954.
