= Township 1, Harper County, Kansas =

Township 1
- Township
- Location within Harper County
- Coordinates: 37°22′35″N 098°20′01″W
- Country: United States
- State: Kansas
- County: Harper

Area
  - Total: 181.06 sq mi (468.95 km^{2})
  - Land: 180.84 sq mi (468.37 km^{2})
  - Water: 0.22 sq mi (0.58 km^{2}) 0.12%
- Elevation: 1,680 ft (512 m)

Population (2020)
  - Total: 834
  - Density: 4.61/sq mi (1.78/km^{2})
- GNIS feature ID: 0470435

Township 1 is a township in Harper County, Kansas, United States. As of the 2020 census, its population was 834.

== History ==
The township was officially designated "Township Number 1" until late 2007, when "Number" was dropped.

== Geography ==
Township 1 covers an area of 181.06 square miles (468.9 km^{2}) and contains Attica.
