= Kingman–Norwich USD 331 =

Public school district in Kingman, Kansas

Address
- 115 N. Main St. Kingman, Kansas, 67068; United States
- Coordinates: 37°38′32″N 98°6′48″W

District information
- Type: Public
- Grades: K to 12
- Schools: 3

Other information
- Website: knusd331.com

Kingman–Norwich USD 331 is a public unified school district headquartered in Kingman, Kansas, United States. The district includes the communities of Kingman, Norwich, Anness, Calista, Cleveland, Milton, Murdock, Rago, Spivey, Suppesville, Varner, Waterloo, and nearby rural areas.

== Schools ==
The school district operates the following schools:

- Kingman High School
- Kingman Elementary-Middle School
- Norwich School

== See also ==
- Kansas State Department of Education
- Kansas State High School Activities Association
- List of high schools in Kansas
- List of unified school districts in Kansas
