= Norwich, Kansas =

City in Kingman County, Kansas

- City
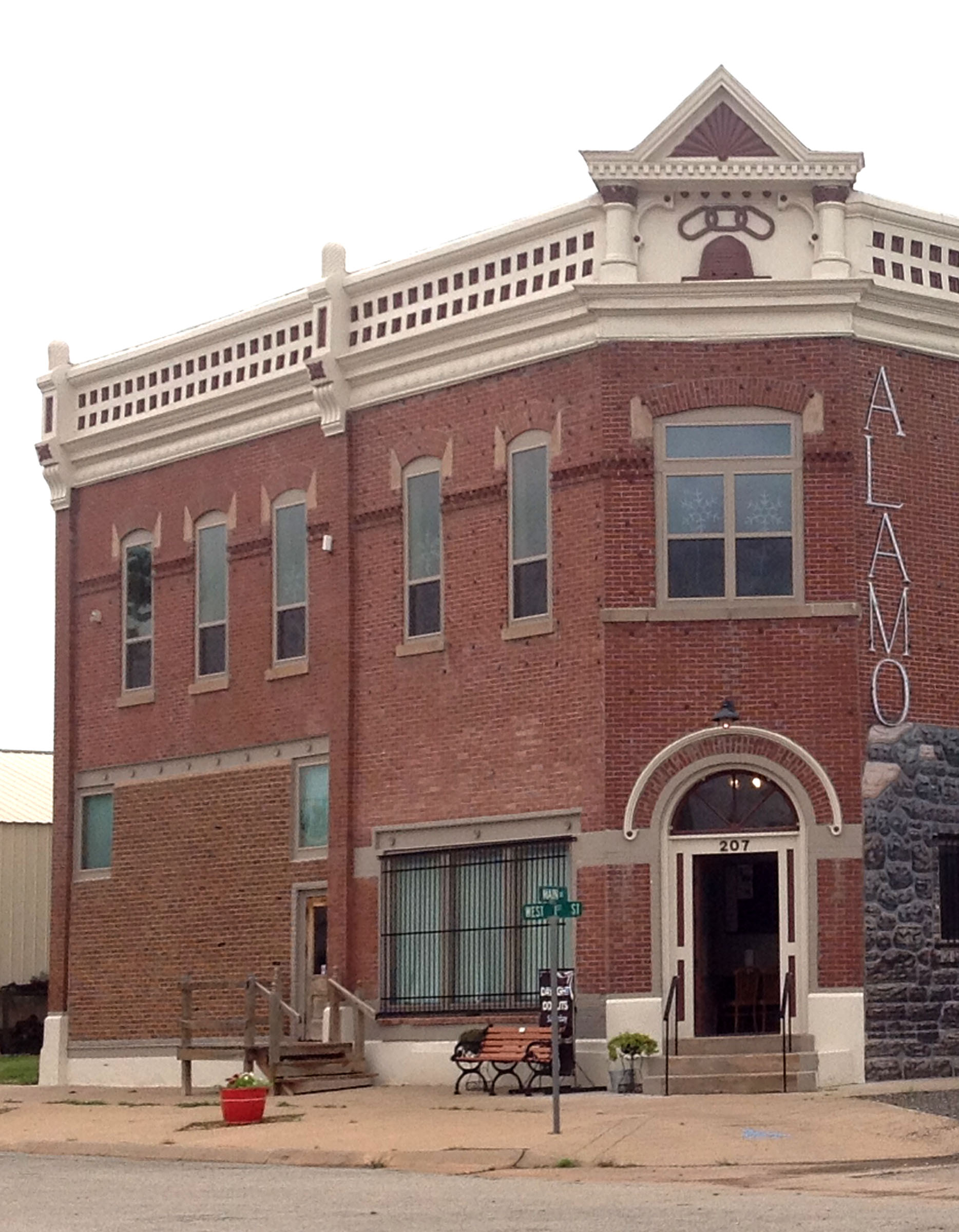
- IOOF in Norwich (2015)

- Location within Kingman County and Kansas

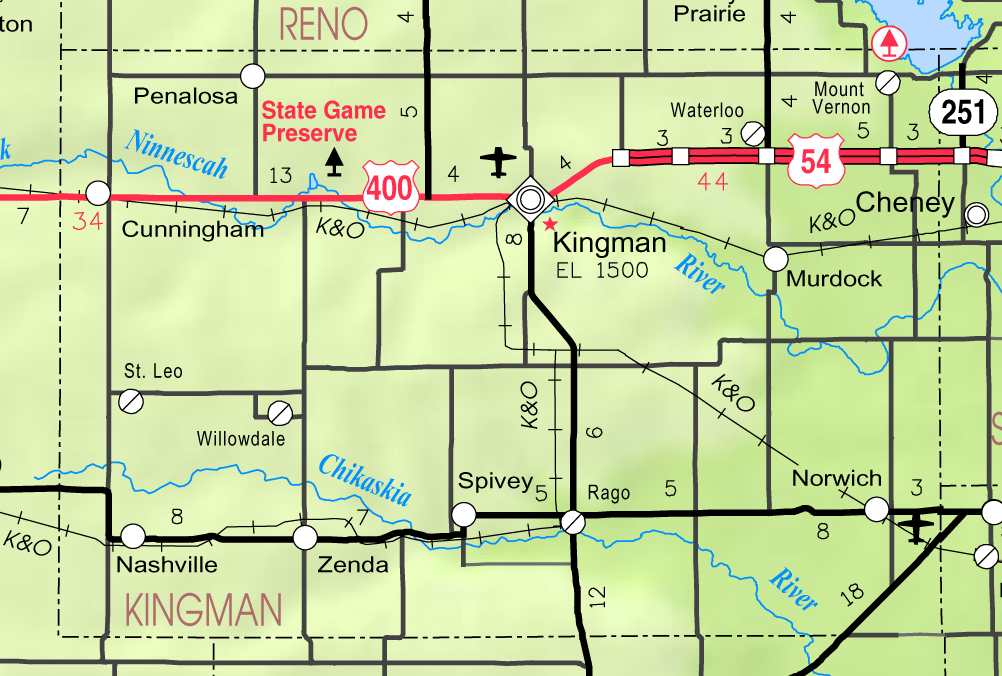
- KDOT map of Kingman County (legend)
- Coordinates: 37°27′26″N 97°50′53″W
- Country: United States
- State: Kansas
- County: Kingman
- Founded: 1885
- Incorporated: 1886
- Named for: Norwich, Connecticut

Area
  - Total: 0.40 sq mi (1.04 km^{2})
  - Land: 0.40 sq mi (1.04 km^{2})
  - Water: 0 sq mi (0.00 km^{2})
- Elevation: 1,496 ft (456 m)

Population (2020)
  - Total: 444
  - Density: 1,110/sq mi (427/km^{2})
- Time zone: UTC-6 (CST)
  - Summer (DST): UTC-5 (CDT)
- ZIP Code: 67118
- Area code: 620
- FIPS code: 20-51600
- GNIS ID: 2395275
- Website: norwichks.com

Norwich is a city in Kingman County, Kansas, United States. As of the 2020 census, the population of the city was 444.

== History ==
Norwich was founded about 1885. It was named after Norwich, Connecticut.

== Geography ==
According to the United States Census Bureau, the city has a total area of 0.46 square miles (1.19 km^{2}), all land.

=== Climate ===
The climate in this area is characterized by hot, humid summers and generally mild to cool winters. According to the Köppen Climate Classification system, Norwich has a humid subtropical climate, abbreviated "Cfa" on climate maps.

Climate data for Norwich, Kansas (1991–2020)
Month	Jan	Feb	Mar	Apr	May	Jun	Jul	Aug	Sep	Oct	Nov	Dec	Year
Mean daily maximum °F (°C)	44.2 (6.8)	49.1 (9.5)	58.8 (14.9)	68.1 (20.1)	77.5 (25.3)	87.7 (30.9)	92.5 (33.6)	91.0 (32.8)	83.7 (28.7)	71.1 (21.7)	57.3 (14.1)	45.4 (7.4)	68.9 (20.5)
Daily mean °F (°C)	32.6 (0.3)	36.8 (2.7)	45.9 (7.7)	55.4 (13.0)	66.0 (18.9)	75.9 (24.4)	80.5 (26.9)	79.0 (26.1)	71.3 (21.8)	58.7 (14.8)	45.2 (7.3)	34.6 (1.4)	56.8 (13.8)
Mean daily minimum °F (°C)	21.0 (−6.1)	24.5 (−4.2)	33.0 (0.6)	42.6 (5.9)	54.4 (12.4)	64.2 (17.9)	68.5 (20.3)	67.0 (19.4)	58.8 (14.9)	46.3 (7.9)	33.2 (0.7)	23.8 (−4.6)	44.8 (7.1)
Average precipitation inches (mm)	1.08 (27)	1.46 (37)	2.32 (59)	3.18 (81)	5.09 (129)	4.63 (118)	3.89 (99)	3.43 (87)	2.40 (61)	3.05 (77)	1.48 (38)	1.13 (29)	33.14 (842)
Average snowfall inches (cm)	1.2 (3.0)	1.1 (2.8)	1.1 (2.8)	0.0 (0.0)	0.0 (0.0)	0.0 (0.0)	0.0 (0.0)	0.0 (0.0)	0.0 (0.0)	0.0 (0.0)	0.6 (1.5)	2.6 (6.6)	6.6 (16.7)
Source: NOAA

== Demographics ==
Historical population
Census	Pop.	Note	%±
1890	301		—
1900	311		3.3%
1910	392		26.0%
1920	430		9.7%
1930	477		10.9%
1940	411		−13.8%
1950	378		−8.0%
1960	430		13.8%
1970	414		−3.7%
1980	476		15.0%
1990	455		−4.4%
2000	551		21.1%
2010	491		−10.9%
2020	444		−9.6%
U.S. Decennial Census

=== 2020 census ===
The 2020 United States census counted 444 people, 187 households, and 123 families in Norwich. The population density was 1,104.5 per square mile (426.4/km^{2}). There were 195 housing units at an average density of 485.1 per square mile (187.3/km^{2}). The racial makeup was 92.34% (410) white or European American (90.09% non-Hispanic white), 0.23% (1) black or African-American, 0.23% (1) Native American or Alaska Native, 0.23% (1) Asian, 0.0% (0) Pacific Islander or Native Hawaiian, 0.9% (4) from other races, and 6.08% (27) from two or more races. Hispanic or Latino of any race was 3.6% (16) of the population.

Of the 187 households, 31.0% had children under the age of 18; 52.4% were married couples living together; 18.7% had a female householder with no spouse or partner present. 30.5% of households consisted of individuals and 17.6% had someone living alone who was 65 years of age or older. The average household size was 2.6 and the average family size was 3.4. The percent of those with a bachelor's degree or higher was estimated to be 17.1% of the population.

26.8% of the population was under the age of 18, 8.3% from 18 to 24, 25.2% from 25 to 44, 23.4% from 45 to 64, and 16.2% who were 65 years of age or older. The median age was 38.3 years. For every 100 females, there were 102.7 males. For every 100 females ages 18 and older, there were 101.9 males.

The 2016–2020 5-year American Community Survey estimates show that the median household income was $50,625 (with a margin of error of +/- $7,441) and the median family income was $68,333 (+/- $19,855). Males had a median income of $48,438 (+/- $8,981) versus $27,000 (+/- $7,440) for females. The median income for those above 16 years old was $35,066 (+/- $4,710). Approximately, 4.6% of families and 6.0% of the population were below the poverty line, including 6.9% of those under the age of 18 and 6.6% of those ages 65 or over.

=== 2010 census ===
As of the census of 2010, there were 491 people, 176 households, and 114 families living in the city. The population density was 1,067.4 inhabitants per square mile (412.1/km^{2}). There were 204 housing units at an average density of 443.5 per square mile (171.2/km^{2}). The racial makeup of the city was 95.1% White, 0.6% African American, 1.0% Native American, and 3.3% from two or more races. Hispanic or Latino of any race were 3.3% of the population.

There were 176 households, of which 36.4% had children under the age of 18 living with them, 57.4% were married couples living together, 4.0% had a female householder with no husband present, 3.4% had a male householder with no wife present, and 35.2% were non-families. 33.0% of all households were made up of individuals, and 19.8% had someone living alone who was 65 years of age or older. The average household size was 2.63 and the average family size was 3.41.

The median age in the city was 31.8 years. 37.5% of residents were under the age of 18; 5.9% were between the ages of 18 and 24; 22.4% were from 25 to 44; 20.6% were from 45 to 64; and 13.6% were 65 years of age or older. The gender makeup of the city was 43.6% male and 56.4% female.

== Education ==
The community is served by Kingman–Norwich USD 331 public school district.

The Norwich Eagles won the following Kansas State High School championships:

- 1974 Boys Track & Field - Class 1A
- 1974 Girls Track & Field - Class 1A
- 1975 Boys Track & Field - Class 1A
- 1977 Girls Track & Field (Indoor) - Class 1A
- 2013 Girls Track & Field - Class 1A

== Transportation ==
The Atchison, Topeka and Santa Fe Railway formerly provided passenger rail service to Norwich on a line between Wichita and Englewood. Dedicated passenger service was provided until at least 1958, while mixed trains continued until at least 1961. As of 2025, the nearest passenger rail station is located in Hutchinson, where Amtrak's Southwest Chief stops once daily on a route from Chicago to Los Angeles.
