= Kingman, Kansas =

City in Kingman County, Kansas

- City and County seat
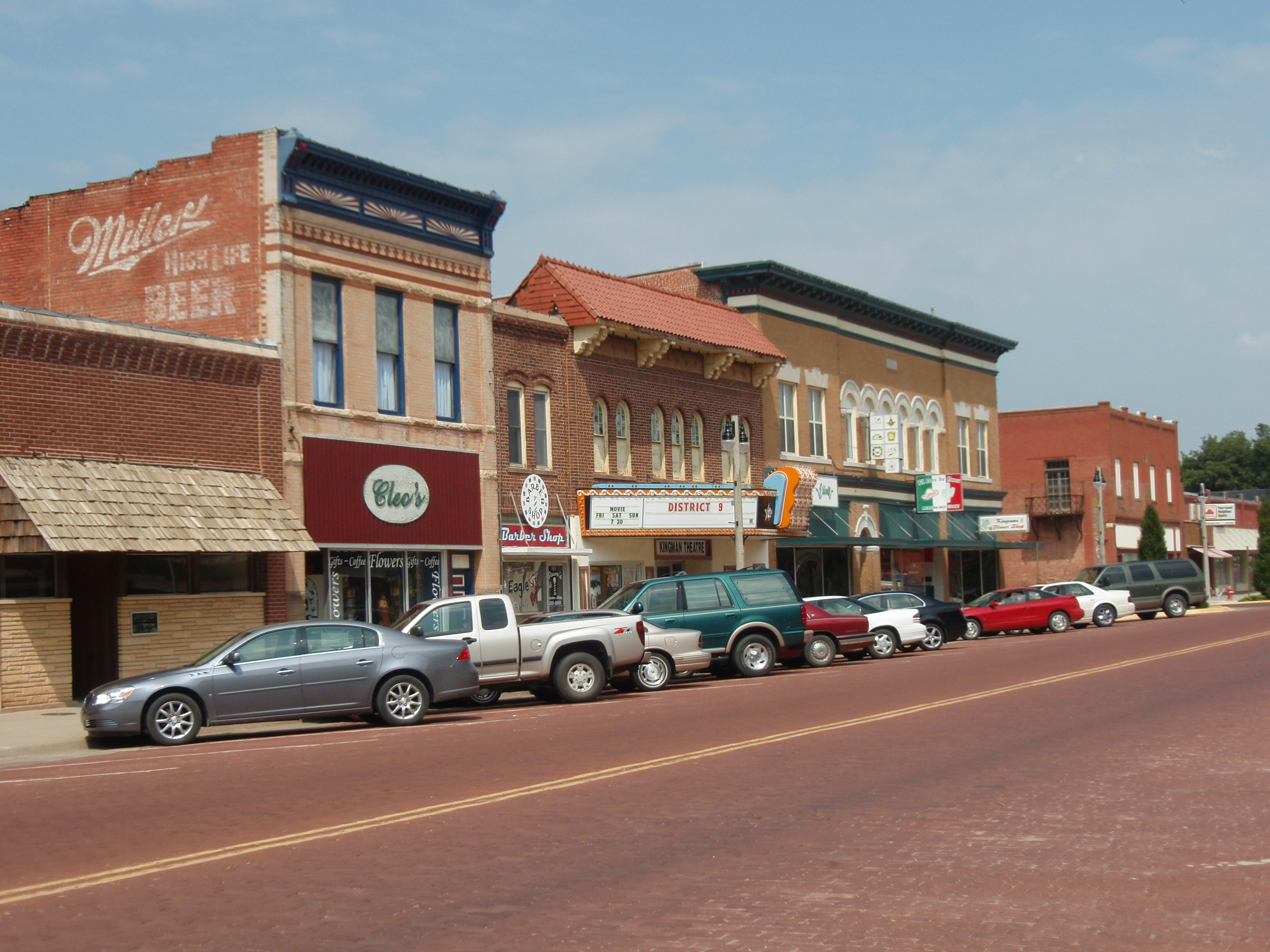
- Downtown Kingman (2009)

- Flag

- Location within Kingman County and Kansas

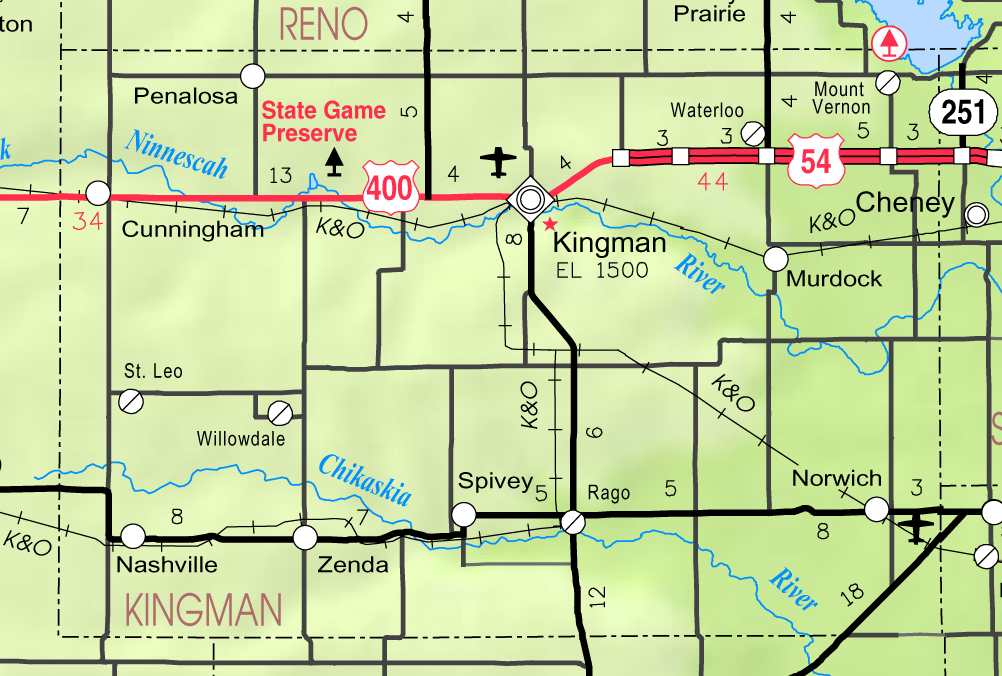
- KDOT map of Kingman County (legend)
- Coordinates: 37°38′49″N 98°6′50″W
- Country: United States
- State: Kansas
- County: Kingman
- Township: White, Ninnescah
- Founded: 1870s
- Platted: 1874
- Incorporated: 1883
- Named for: Samuel Kingman

Government
  - Type: Council-Manager
  - Mayor: Tracy Winsor
  - City Manager: Greg Graffman

Area
  - Total: 3.47 sq mi (9.00 km^{2})
  - Land: 3.46 sq mi (8.97 km^{2})
  - Water: 0.012 sq mi (0.03 km^{2})
- Elevation: 1,519 ft (463 m)

Population (2020)
  - Total: 3,105
  - Density: 897/sq mi (346/km^{2})
- Time zone: UTC-6 (CST)
  - Summer (DST): UTC-5 (CDT)
- ZIP Code: 67068
- Area code: 620
- FIPS code: 20-36950
- GNIS ID: 485602
- Website: CityOfKingman.com

Kingman is a city in and the county seat of Kingman County, Kansas, United States. As of the 2020 census, the population of the city was 3,105.

== History ==
Kingman was laid out in 1874. Like Kingman County, it was named for Samuel A. Kingman, chief justice of the Kansas Supreme Court.

== Geography ==
Kingman is located next to the Ninnescah River. According to the United States Census Bureau, the city has a total area of 3.53 square miles (9.14 km^{2}), of which 3.52 square miles (9.12 km^{2}) is land and 0.01 square miles (0.03 km^{2}) is water.

=== Climate ===
The climate in this area is characterized by hot, humid summers and generally mild to cool winters. According to the Köppen Climate Classification system, Kingman has a humid subtropical climate, abbreviated "Cfa" on climate maps.

Climate data for Kingman, Kansas, 1991–2020 normals, extremes 1907–present
Month	Jan	Feb	Mar	Apr	May	Jun	Jul	Aug	Sep	Oct	Nov	Dec	Year
Record high °F (°C)	79 (26)	88 (31)	98 (37)	98 (37)	106 (41)	112 (44)	116 (47)	115 (46)	109 (43)	100 (38)	96 (36)	84 (29)	116 (47)
Mean maximum °F (°C)	67.5 (19.7)	72.0 (22.2)	80.2 (26.8)	86.9 (30.5)	92.8 (33.8)	97.5 (36.4)	103.4 (39.7)	101.9 (38.8)	97.3 (36.3)	89.3 (31.8)	75.8 (24.3)	65.6 (18.7)	104.7 (40.4)
Mean daily maximum °F (°C)	43.8 (6.6)	48.2 (9.0)	58.2 (14.6)	67.6 (19.8)	76.9 (24.9)	87.4 (30.8)	92.8 (33.8)	90.7 (32.6)	82.8 (28.2)	70.3 (21.3)	56.9 (13.8)	45.2 (7.3)	68.4 (20.2)
Daily mean °F (°C)	31.5 (−0.3)	35.7 (2.1)	45.2 (7.3)	54.7 (12.6)	64.9 (18.3)	75.3 (24.1)	80.5 (26.9)	78.3 (25.7)	70.0 (21.1)	56.9 (13.8)	44.3 (6.8)	33.4 (0.8)	55.9 (13.3)
Mean daily minimum °F (°C)	19.2 (−7.1)	23.1 (−4.9)	32.1 (0.1)	41.9 (5.5)	53.0 (11.7)	63.1 (17.3)	68.2 (20.1)	66.0 (18.9)	57.2 (14.0)	43.4 (6.3)	31.7 (−0.2)	21.6 (−5.8)	43.4 (6.3)
Mean minimum °F (°C)	4.9 (−15.1)	7.1 (−13.8)	15.4 (−9.2)	26.7 (−2.9)	38.9 (3.8)	52.9 (11.6)	59.3 (15.2)	56.9 (13.8)	42.0 (5.6)	27.3 (−2.6)	15.6 (−9.1)	8.2 (−13.2)	0.1 (−17.7)
Record low °F (°C)	−17 (−27)	−22 (−30)	−4 (−20)	16 (−9)	23 (−5)	41 (5)	47 (8)	42 (6)	24 (−4)	13 (−11)	−4 (−20)	−17 (−27)	−22 (−30)
Average precipitation inches (mm)	0.89 (23)	1.33 (34)	2.47 (63)	3.10 (79)	4.88 (124)	4.40 (112)	4.06 (103)	3.67 (93)	2.82 (72)	2.93 (74)	1.38 (35)	1.29 (33)	33.22 (845)
Average snowfall inches (cm)	1.5 (3.8)	2.1 (5.3)	1.7 (4.3)	0.2 (0.51)	0.0 (0.0)	0.0 (0.0)	0.0 (0.0)	0.0 (0.0)	0.0 (0.0)	0.1 (0.25)	0.7 (1.8)	2.6 (6.6)	8.9 (22.56)
Average precipitation days (≥ 0.01 in)	3.9	4.3	6.6	7.3	8.7	7.3	7.4	7.1	5.7	6.1	4.2	4.2	72.8
Average snowy days (≥ 0.1 in)	1.7	1.8	0.7	0.2	0.0	0.0	0.0	0.0	0.0	0.2	0.6	1.6	6.8
Source 1: NOAA
Source 2: National Weather Service

== Demographics ==
Historical population
Census	Pop.	Note	%±
1890	2,390		—
1900	1,785		−25.3%
1910	2,570		44.0%
1920	2,407		−6.3%
1930	2,752		14.3%
1940	3,213		16.8%
1950	3,200		−0.4%
1960	3,582		11.9%
1970	3,622		1.1%
1980	3,563		−1.6%
1990	3,196		−10.3%
2000	3,387		6.0%
2010	3,177		−6.2%
2020	3,105		−2.3%
U.S. Decennial Census

=== 2020 census ===
As of the 2020 census, there were 3,105 people, 1,335 households, and 782 families living in Kingman. The population density was 865.4 inhabitants per square mile (334.1/km^{2}), and there were 1,531 housing units at an average density of 426.7 per square mile (164.7/km^{2}).

The median age was 43.7 years. 22.6% of residents were under the age of 18, 7.5% were from 18 to 24, 22.0% were from 25 to 44, 26.4% were from 45 to 64, and 21.4% were 65 years of age or older. For every 100 females, there were 93.9 males, and for every 100 females age 18 and over, there were 93.6 males. 0.0% of residents lived in urban areas, while 100.0% lived in rural areas.

Of the 1,335 households, 27.1% had children under the age of 18 living in them. Of all households, 44.5% were married-couple households, 20.7% were households with a male householder and no spouse or partner present, and 28.8% were households with a female householder and no spouse or partner present. About 36.7% of all households were made up of individuals, and 18.5% had someone living alone who was 65 years of age or older. The average household size was 2.0 and the average family size was 2.7. There were 1,531 housing units, of which 12.8% were vacant. The homeowner vacancy rate was 2.4%, and the rental vacancy rate was 12.1%.

Racial composition as of the 2020 census
Race	Number	Percent
White	2,823	90.9%
Black or African American	18	0.6%
American Indian and Alaska Native	20	0.6%
Asian	30	1.0%
Native Hawaiian and Other Pacific Islander	0	0.0%
Some other race	62	2.0%
Two or more races	152	4.9%
Hispanic or Latino (of any race)	161	5.2%

Non-Hispanic White residents accounted for 89.15% of the population.

Educational attainment

The percent of those with a bachelor's degree or higher was estimated to be 13.7% of the population.

Income and poverty

The 2016–2020 5-year American Community Survey estimates show that the median household income was $50,273 (with a margin of error of +/- $7,023) and the median family income was $63,583 (+/- $18,452). Males had a median income of $39,469 (+/- $5,782) versus $18,100 (+/- $2,839) for females. The median income for those above 16 years old was $28,203 (+/- $4,180). Approximately, 9.4% of families and 9.0% of the population were below the poverty line, including 17.4% of those under the age of 18 and 1.6% of those ages 65 or over.

=== 2010 census ===
As of the census of 2010, there were 3,177 people, 1,346 households, and 810 families living in the city. The population density was 902.6 inhabitants per square mile (348.5/km^{2}). There were 1,546 housing units at an average density of 439.2 per square mile (169.6/km^{2}). The racial makeup of the city was 96.7% White, 0.1% African American, 0.7% Native American, 0.4% Asian, 0.9% from other races, and 1.2% from two or more races. Hispanic or Latino of any race were 2.7% of the population.

There were 1,346 households, of which 29.3% had children under the age of 18 living with them, 46.7% were married couples living together, 9.7% had a female householder with no husband present, 3.9% had a male householder with no wife present, and 39.8% were non-families. 35.0% of all households were made up of individuals, and 18% had someone living alone who was 65 years of age or older. The average household size was 2.29 and the average family size was 2.95.

The median age in the city was 40.7 years. 24.9% of residents were under the age of 18; 8% were between the ages of 18 and 24; 21.6% were from 25 to 44; 23.3% were from 45 to 64; and 22.2% were 65 years of age or older. The gender makeup of the city was 47.7% male and 52.3% female.

== Education ==
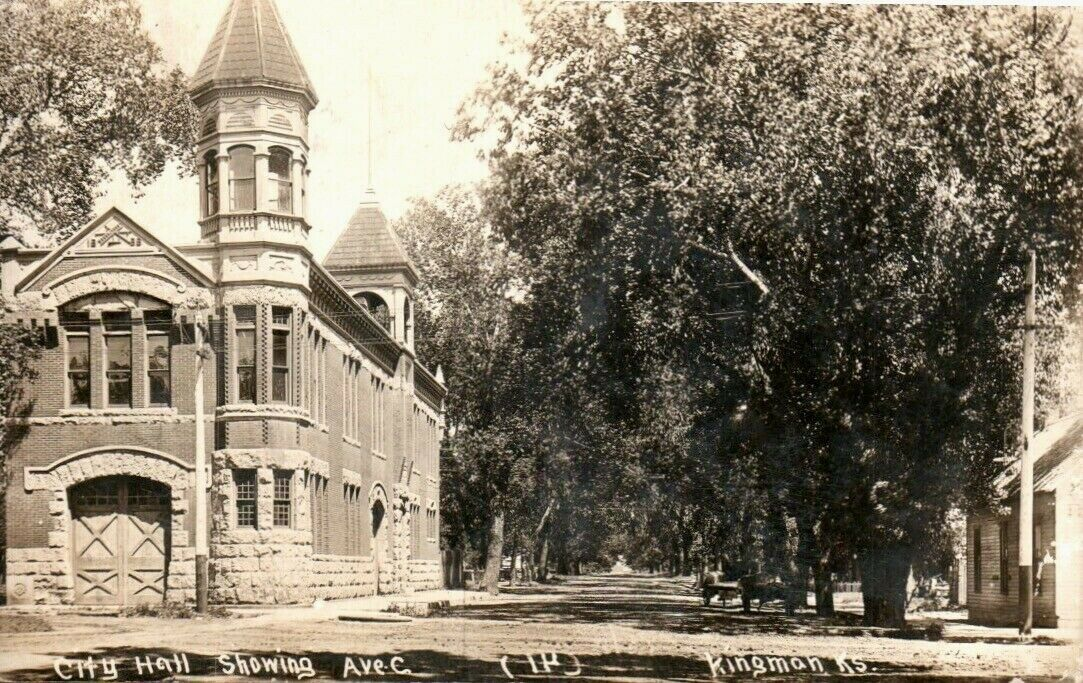
400 N. Main St. in Kingman seen in a postcard mailed on August 19, 1913

The community is served by Kingman-Norwich USD 331 public school district, which operates two schools in Kingman.

- Kingman High School
- Kingman Elementary-Middle School

Private Schools

- St. Patrick Catholic School

== Transportation ==
Bus service is provided daily eastward towards Wichita, Kansas and westward towards Pueblo, Colorado by BeeLine Express (subcontractor of Greyhound Lines).

The Atchison, Topeka and Santa Fe Railway formerly provided passenger rail service to Kingman. The depot served as a junction point. On the line between Wichita and Pratt, dedicated passenger service was provided until at least 1926, while mixed trains continued until at least 1961. On the line between Hutchinson and Ponca City, dedicated passenger service was provided until at least 1954, while mixed trains continued until at least 1961. As of 2025, the nearest passenger rail station is located in Hutchinson, where Amtrak's Southwest Chief stops once daily on a route from Chicago to Los Angeles.

== Notable people ==
- George Aiton, Major League Baseball player
- Agnes Leist Beebe, singer and voice teacher
- Clyde Cessna, founder of the Cessna Aircraft Corporation
- Martin Dewey, orthodontist
- Eugene John Gerber, bishop of the Diocese of Wichita
- Don Lock, Major League Baseball player
- Sarah Smarsh, author and journalist
- Paul Wunsch, Speaker of the Kansas House of Representatives from 1943-1945

== Gallery ==
- Historic Images of Kingman, Special Photo Collections at Wichita State University Library
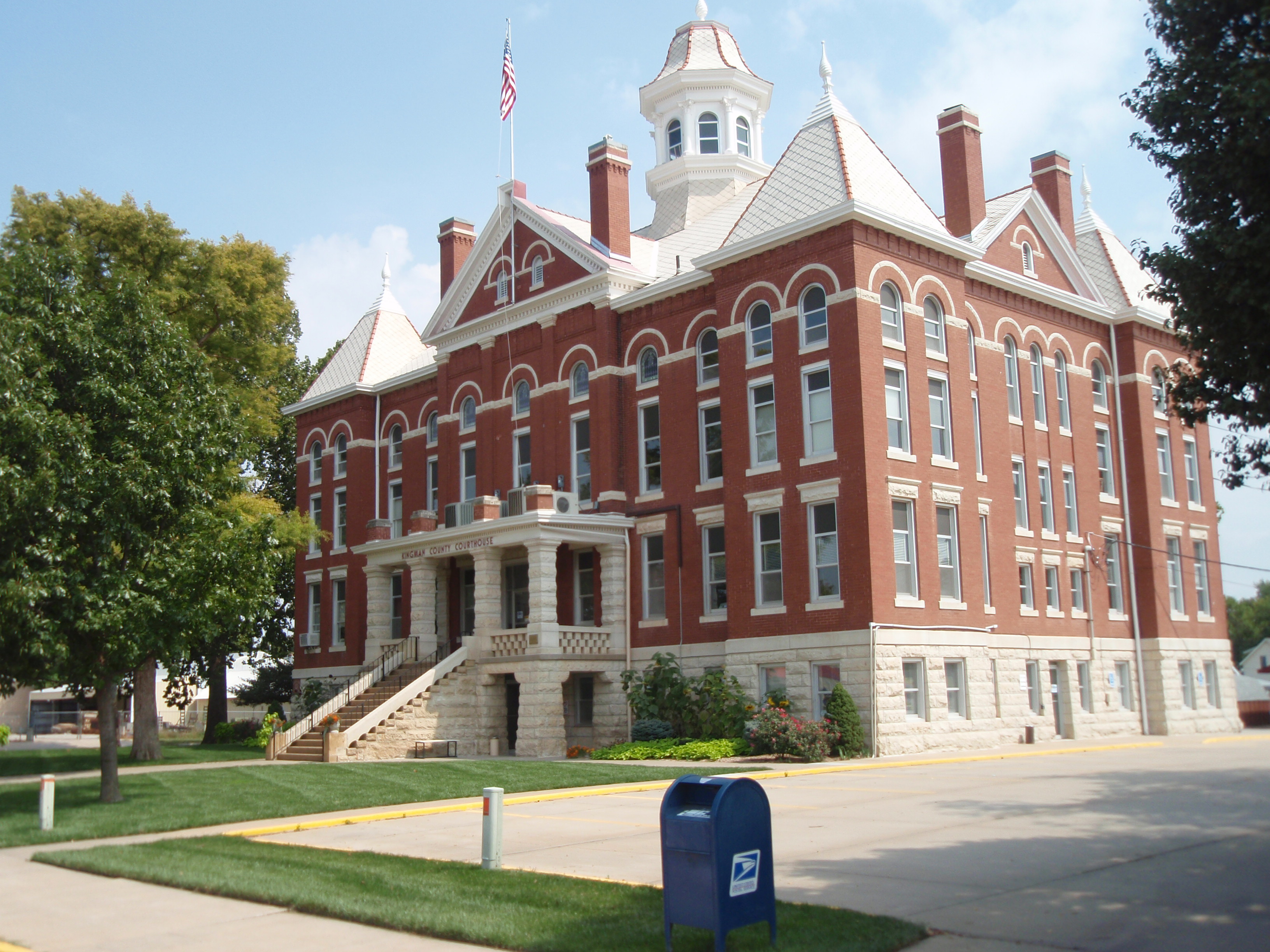
Kingman County Courthouse (2009)

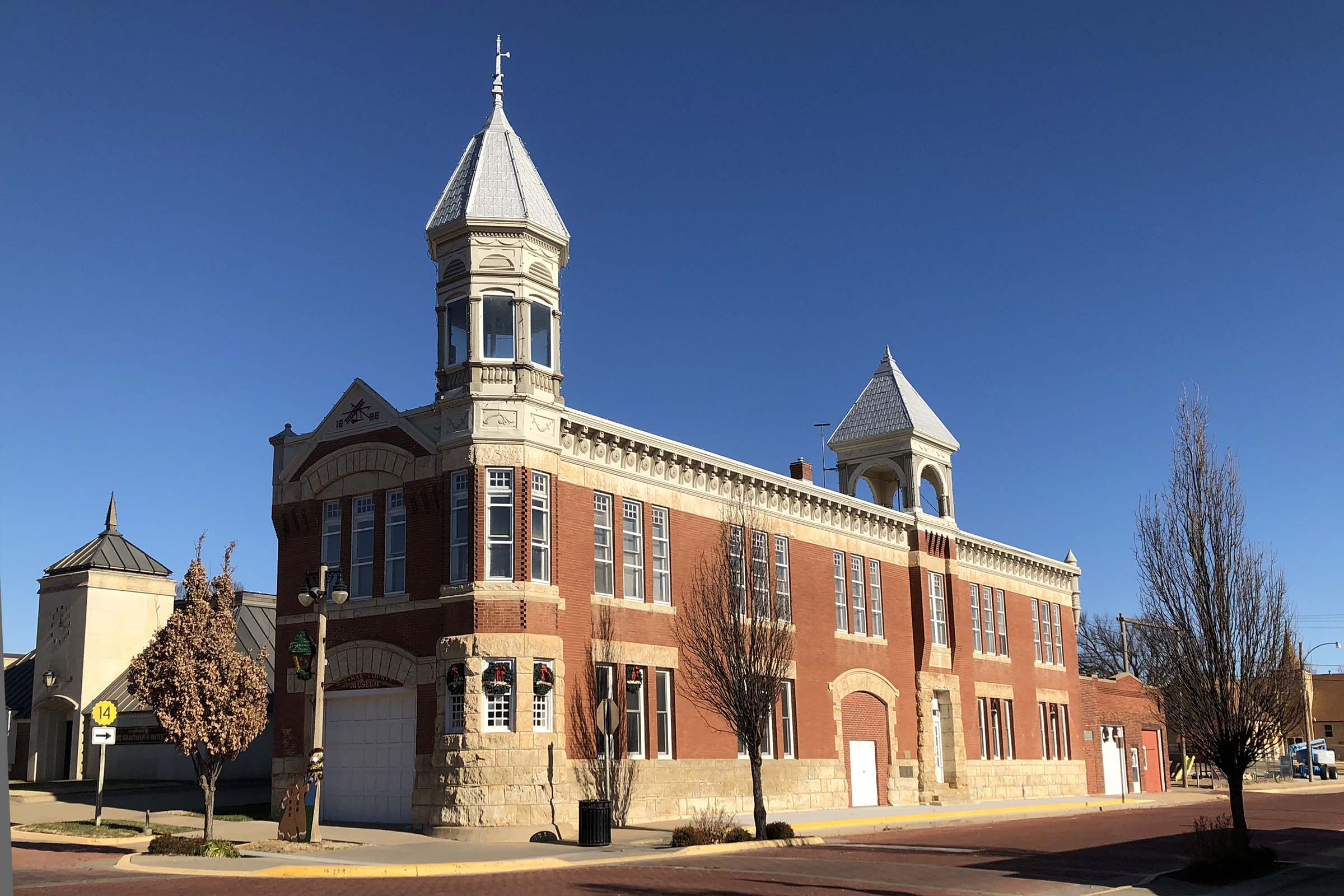
Old City Hall Building (2017)

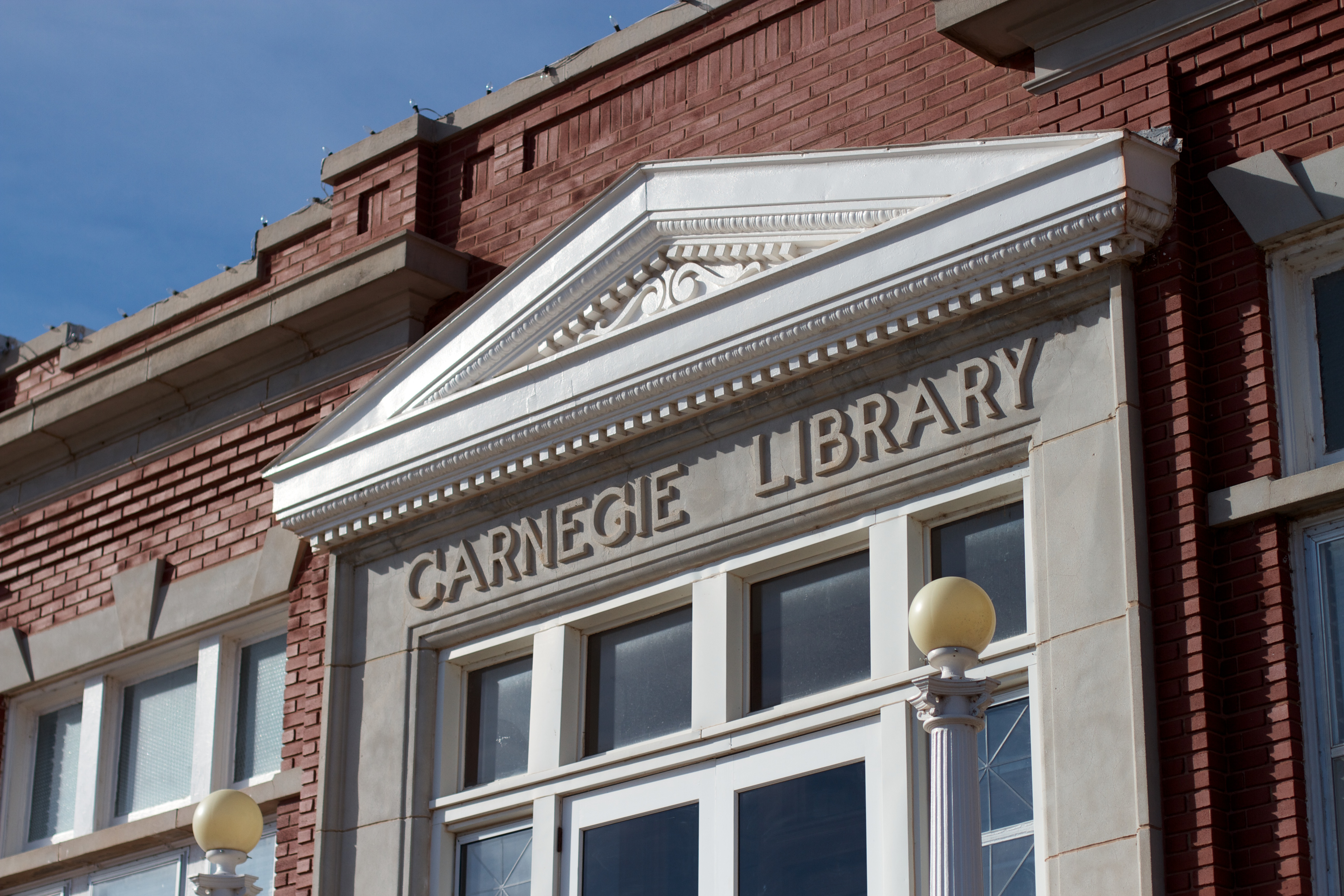
Kingman Carnegie Library (2012)

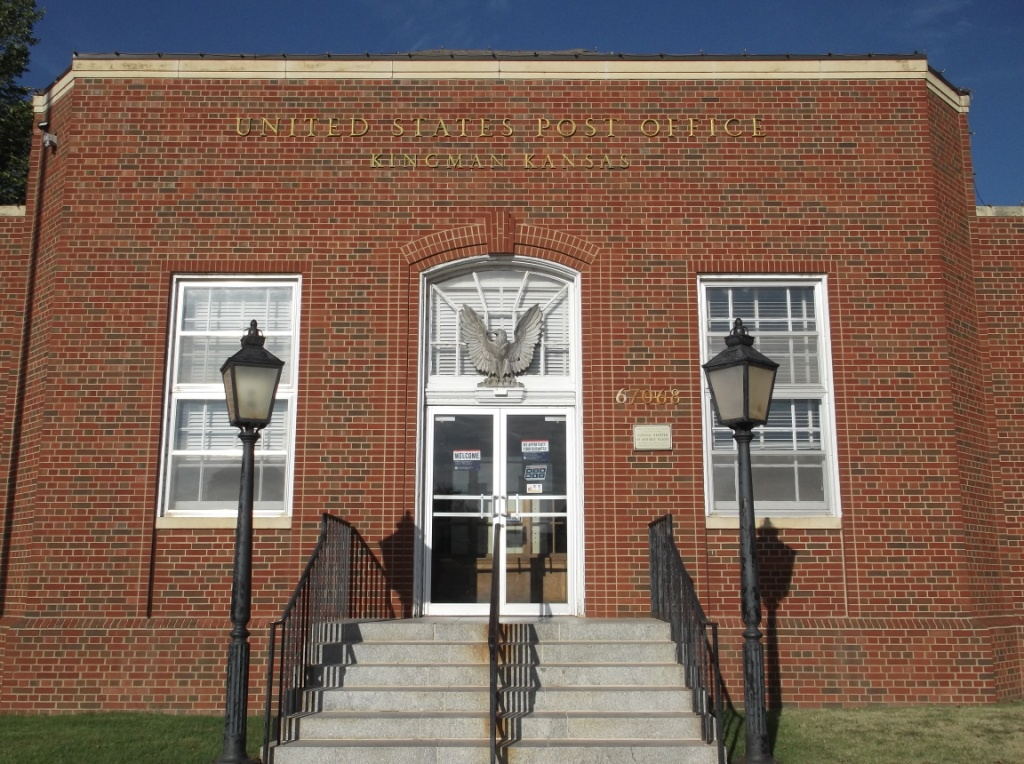
Kingman U.S. Post Office (2014)

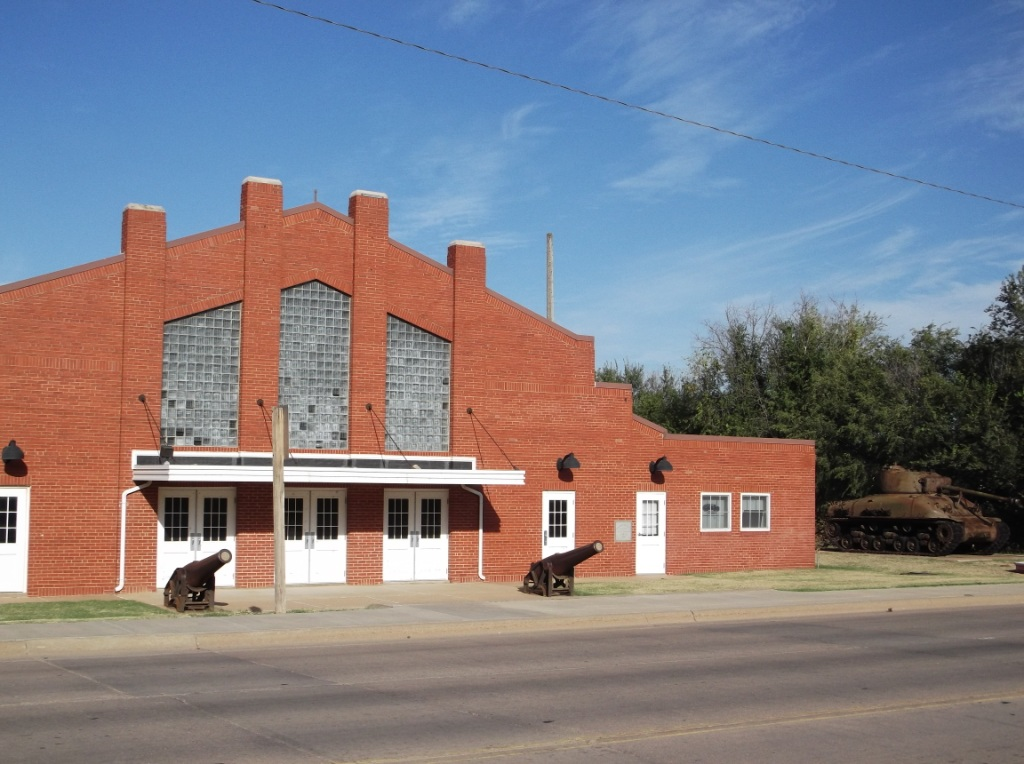
Kingman National Guard Armory (2014)

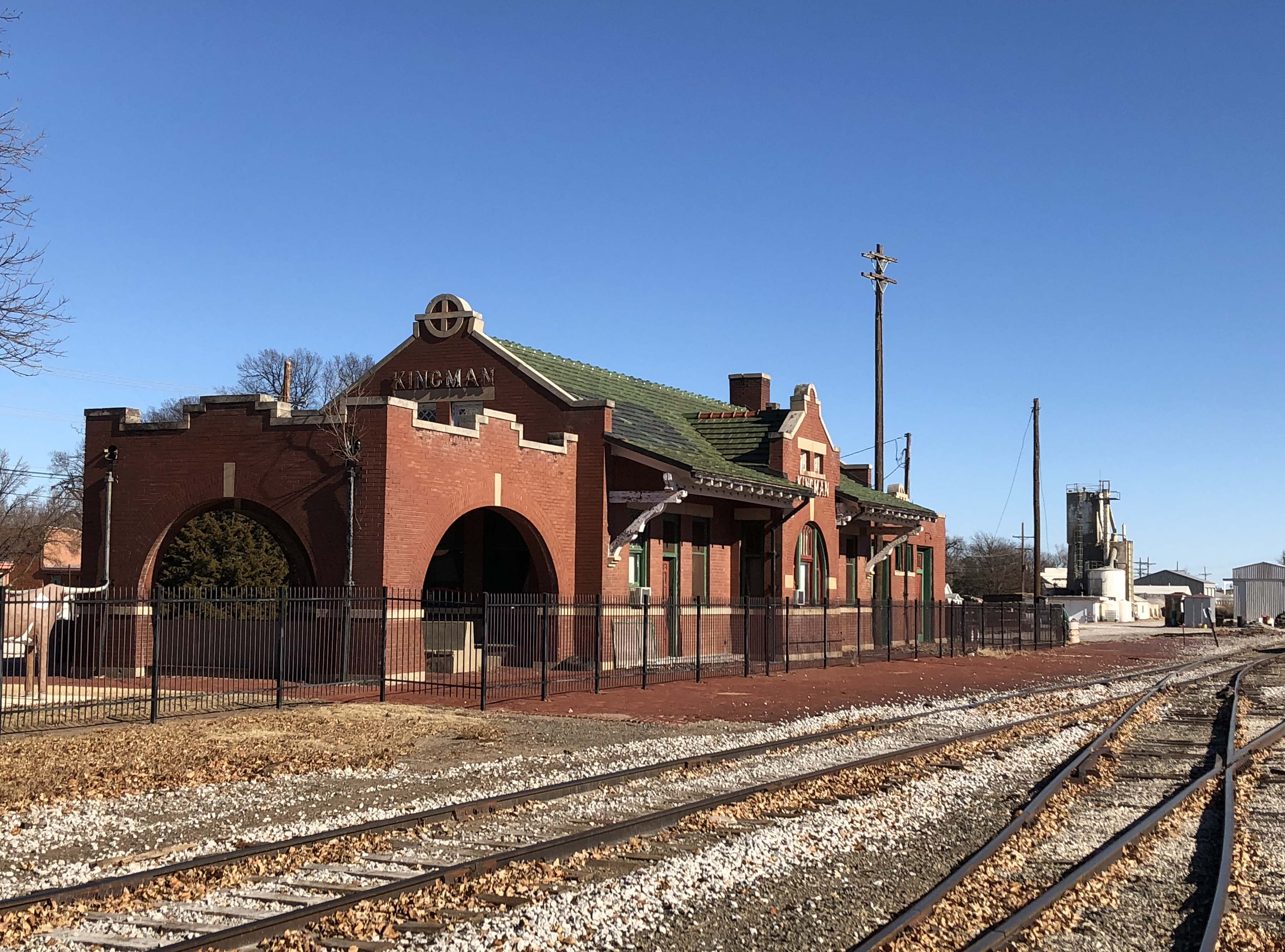
Former Kingman Santa Fe Depot (2017)
