= Township 6, Harper County, Kansas =

Township 6
- Township
- Location in Harper County
- Coordinates: 37°20′30″N 098°03′31″W
- Country: United States
- State: Kansas
- County: Harper

Area
  - Total: 108.28 sq mi (280.45 km^{2})
  - Land: 108.22 sq mi (280.28 km^{2})
  - Water: 0.066 sq mi (0.17 km^{2}) 0.06%
- Elevation: 1,539 ft (469 m)

Population (2020)
  - Total: 271
  - Density: 2.50/sq mi (0.967/km^{2})
- GNIS ID: 0470465

Township 6 is a township in Harper County, Kansas, United States. As of the 2020 census, its population was 271.

== History ==
The township was officially designated "Township Number 6" until late 2007, when "Number" was dropped.

== Geography ==
Township 6 covers an area of 108.28 square miles (280.4 km^{2}) and contains no incorporated settlements.
