= Hutchinson station =

Train station in Kansas, United States

Hutchinson, KS
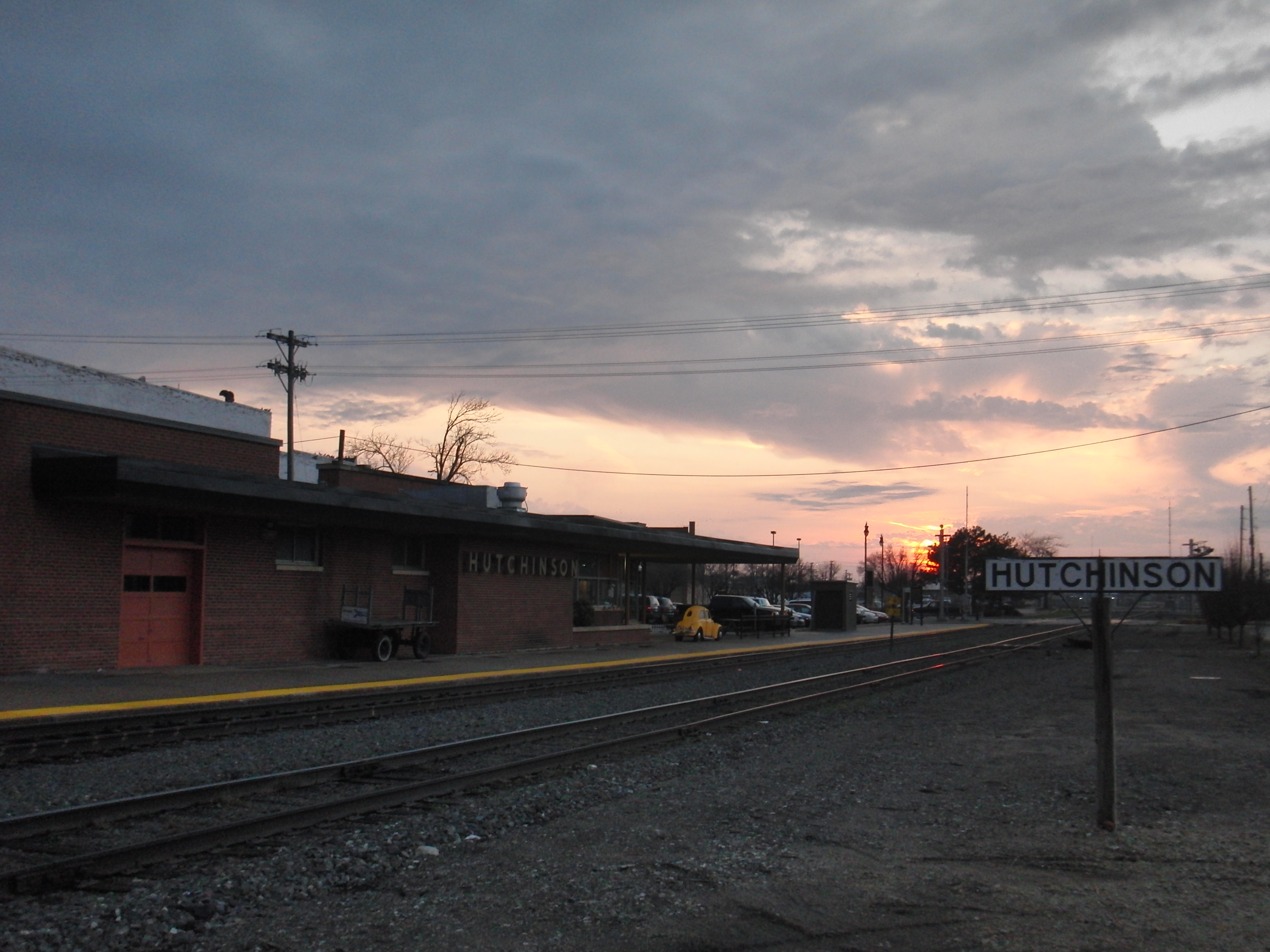
- The depot at sunset

General information
- Location: North Walnut and East 3rd Streets; Hutchinson, Kansas
- Coordinates: 38.0557°N 97.9312°W
- Line: BNSF Railway La Junta Subdivision
- Platforms: 1 side platform
- Tracks: 2

Other information
- Station code: Amtrak: HUT

History
- Opened: 1897
- Rebuilt: 1950; May 10, 2021–April 21, 2022

Passengers
- FY 2025: 4,125 (Amtrak)

Services
| Preceding station | Amtrak | Following station |
|---|---|---|
| Dodge City toward Los Angeles | Southwest Chief | Newton toward Chicago |
Former services
| Preceding station | Atchison, Topeka and Santa Fe Railway | Following station |
|---|---|---|
| Nickerson toward Los Angeles | Main Line Via Great Bend, Ellinwood | Burrton toward Chicago |
| Partridge toward Los Angeles | Main Line | Burrton toward Chicago |
| Terminus | Hutchinson – Ponca City | Darlow toward Ponca City |
Location

Hutchinson station is a train station in Hutchinson, Kansas, United States, served by Amtrak's Southwest Chief train. Hutchinson station was originally a Victorian structure built in 1897 that was replaced by a more contemporary brick depot in 1950. Both buildings were built and owned by the Atchison, Topeka and Santa Fe Railway. The original station included The Bisonte, a Harvey House.
