= Castleton Township, Kansas =

Township in Reno County, Kansas, U.S.

Castleton Township
- Township
- Location within Reno County
- Coordinates: 37.863236°N 97.950835°W
- Country: United States
- State: Kansas
- County: Reno
- Established: 1872

Government
  - District 2 County Commissioner: Ron Hirst

Area
  - Total: 54.366 sq mi (140.81 km^{2})
  - Land: 54.361 sq mi (140.79 km^{2})
  - Water: 0.005 sq mi (0.013 km^{2}) 0.01%

Population (2020)
  - Total: 323
  - Density: 5.94/sq mi (2.29/km^{2})
- Time zone: UTC-6 (CST)
  - Summer (DST): UTC-5 (CDT)
- Area code: 620 and 316
- GNIS feature ID: 473799

Castleton Township is a township in Reno County, Kansas, United States. As of the 2020 census, its population was 323.

== History ==
The first township in Reno County was Reno Township, which covered the whole county upon its creation in 1872. Later in the year, Castleton Township would be split off from Reno. A couple years later in 1878, Albion Township would be split off from Castleton Township.

== Geography ==
Castleton Township covers an area of 54.366 square miles (140.81 square kilometers). The North Fork Ninnescah River flows through it.

=== Communities ===
- Castleton

=== Adjacent townships ===
Lincoln Township, Reno County
| Center Township, Reno County | northwest | north | northeast | Yoder Township, Reno County |
| Troy Township, Reno County | west | self | east | Haven Township, Reno County |
| Roscoe Township, Reno County | southwest | south | southeast | Ninnescah Township, Reno County |
Albion Township, Reno County

== Transportation ==
=== Major highways ===
- K-14
