= Loda Township, Kansas =

Township in Reno County, Kansas, U.S.

Loda Township
- Township
- Location within Reno County
- Coordinates: 37.783263°N 98.190701°W
- Country: United States
- State: Kansas
- County: Reno
- Established: 1877

Government
  - District 2 County Commissioner: Ron Hirst

Area
  - Total: 38.018 sq mi (98.47 km^{2})
  - Land: 37.9 sq mi (98 km^{2})
  - Water: 0.118 sq mi (0.31 km^{2}) 0.31%

Population (2020)
  - Total: 110
  - Density: 2.9/sq mi (1.1/km^{2})
- Time zone: UTC-6 (CST)
  - Summer (DST): UTC-5 (CDT)
- Area code: 620
- GNIS feature ID: 473781

Loda Township is a township in Reno County, Kansas, United States. As of the 2020 census, its population was 110.

== History ==
The first township in Reno County was Reno Township, which covered the whole county upon its creation in 1872. In 1874, Langdon Township was split off from Reno Township, and then in 1877 Loda Township was split off from Langdon Township.

== Geography ==
Loda Township covers an area of 38.018 square miles (98.47 square kilometers).

=== Adjacent townships ===
Arlington Township, Reno County
		north	northeast	Troy Township, Reno County
Bell Township, Reno County	west	self	east	Roscoe Township, Reno County
Eureka Township, Kingman County	southwest	south	southeast	White Township, Kingman County
Hoosier Township, Kingman County

== Transportation ==
=== Major highways ===
- K-11
