= Westminster Township, Kansas =

Township in Reno County, Kansas, U.S.

Westminster Township
- Township
- Location within Reno County
- Coordinates: 37.955699°N 98.197067°W
- Country: United States
- State: Kansas
- County: Reno
- Established: 1874

Government
  - District 2 County Commissioner: Ron Hirst

Area
  - Total: 36.103 sq mi (93.51 km^{2})
  - Land: 36.103 sq mi (93.51 km^{2})
  - Water: 0 sq mi (0 km^{2}) 0%

Population (2020)
  - Total: 177
  - Density: 4.90/sq mi (1.89/km^{2})
- Time zone: UTC-6 (CST)
  - Summer (DST): UTC-5 (CDT)
- Area code: 620
- GNIS feature ID: 473618

Westminster Township (Note: Sometimes spelled Westminister) is a township in Reno County, Kansas, United States. As of the 2020 census, its population was 177.

== History ==
The first township in Reno County was Reno Township, which covered the whole county upon its creation in 1872. Center Township was created in 1873 from Reno Township, and from Center Township Westminster Township was created in 1874. Plevna Township would also be created from Westminster Township in 1879. The first settler in what was to become Westminster Township was John Martin, who settled in the area in the spring of 1873.

== Geography ==
Westminster Township covers an area of 36.103 square miles (93.51 square kilometers).

=== Communities ===
- Abbyville

=== Adjacent townships ===
Enterprise Township, Reno County
Walnut Township, Reno County	northwest	north	northeast	Salt Creek Township, Reno County
Plevna Township, Reno County	west	self	east	Center Township, Reno County
Langdon Township, Reno County	southwest	south	southeast	Troy Township, Reno County
Arlington Township, Reno County

== Transportation ==
=== Major highways ===
- US-50
