= Plevna Township, Kansas =

Township in Reno County, Kansas, U.S.

Plevna Township
- Township
- Location within Reno County
- Coordinates: 37.963069°N 98.313633°W
- Country: United States
- State: Kansas
- County: Reno
- Established: 1879

Government
  - District 2 County Commissioner: Ron Hirst

Area
  - Total: 36.244 sq mi (93.87 km^{2})
  - Land: 36.23 sq mi (93.8 km^{2})
  - Water: 0.014 sq mi (0.036 km^{2}) 0.04%

Population (2020)
  - Total: 190
  - Density: 5.2/sq mi (2.0/km^{2})
- Time zone: UTC-6 (CST)
  - Summer (DST): UTC-5 (CDT)
- Area code: 316 and 620
- GNIS feature ID: 473606

Plevna Township is a township in Reno County, Kansas, United States. As of the 2020 census, its population was 190.

== History ==
The first township in Reno County was Reno Township, which covered the whole county upon its creation in 1872. From Reno Township, Center Township was formed in 1873. Westminster Township was formed from Center Township in 1874, and then finally Plevna Township was split from Westminster Township in 1879.

== Geography ==
Plevna Township covers an area of 36.244 square miles (93.87 square kilometers).

=== Communities ===
- Plevna

=== Adjacent townships ===
Huntsville Township, Reno County
Hayes Township, Reno County	northwest	north	northeast	Enterprise Township, Reno County
Sylvia Township, Reno County	west	self	east	Westminster Township, Reno County
Grove Township, Reno County	southwest	south	southeast	Arlington Township, Reno County
Langdon Township, Reno County

== Transportation ==
=== Major highways ===
- US-50
