= Medford Township, Kansas =

Township in Reno County, Kansas, U.S.

Medford Township
- Township
- Location within Reno County
- Coordinates: 38.122471°N 98.206639°W
- Country: United States
- State: Kansas
- County: Reno
- Established: 1874

Government
  - District 2 County Commissioner: Ron Hirst

Area
  - Total: 31.973 sq mi (82.81 km^{2})
  - Land: 31.934 sq mi (82.71 km^{2})
  - Water: 0.039 sq mi (0.10 km^{2}) 0.12%

Population (2020)
  - Total: 164
  - Density: 5.14/sq mi (1.98/km^{2})
- Time zone: UTC-6 (CST)
  - Summer (DST): UTC-5 (CDT)
- Area code: 620
- GNIS feature ID: 475890

Medford Township is a township in Reno County, Kansas, United States. As of the 2020 census, its population was 164.

== History ==
The first township in Reno County was Reno Township, which covered the whole county upon its creation in 1872. The first settler in what would become Medford Township was R. D. Kelsey, who settled there in the fall of 1873. In 1874, Medford Township separated from Reno Township. Later, in 1877, Hayes Township would split off and in 1879 Enterprise Township would also split off.

== Geography ==
Medford Township covers an area of 31.973 square miles (82.81 square kilometers). The Arkansas River flows through it.

=== Adjacent townships ===
Sterling Township, Rice County
		north	northeast	Grant Township, Reno County
Walnut Township, Reno County	west	self	east	Salt Creek Township, Reno County
Huntsville Township, Reno County	southwest	south
Enterprise Township, Reno County
