= Little River Township, Kansas =

Township in Reno County, Kansas, U.S.

Little River Township
- Township
- Location within Reno County
- Coordinates: 38.122196°N 97.747612°W
- Country: United States
- State: Kansas
- County: Reno
- Established: 1872

Government
  - District 3 County Commissioner: Ron Vincent

Area
  - Total: 36.194 sq mi (93.74 km^{2})
  - Land: 36.034 sq mi (93.33 km^{2})
  - Water: 0.16 sq mi (0.41 km^{2}) 0.44%

Population (2020)
  - Total: 1,842
  - Density: 51.12/sq mi (19.74/km^{2})
- Time zone: UTC-6 (CST)
  - Summer (DST): UTC-5 (CDT)
- Area code: 620
- GNIS feature ID: 477732

Little River Township is a township in Reno County, Kansas, United States. As of the 2020 census, its population was 1,842.

== History ==
The first township in Reno County was Reno Township, which covered the whole county upon its creation in 1872. Later in the year, Little River Township was split off from Reno Township.

== Geography ==
Little River Township covers an area of 36.194 square miles (93.74 square kilometers).

=== Communities ===
- Buhler

=== Adjacent townships ===
Superior Township, McPherson County
		north	northeast	Turkey Creek Township, McPherson County
Medora Township, Reno County	west	self	east	Alta Township, Harvey County
Clay Township, Reno County	southwest	south	southeast	Burrton Township, Harvey County
Valley Township, Reno County
