= Medora Township, Kansas =

Township in Reno County, Kansas, U.S.

Medora Township
- Township
- Location within Reno County
- Coordinates: 38.141791°N 97.854547°W
- Country: United States
- State: Kansas
- County: Reno

Government
  - District 3 County Commissioner: Ron Vincent

Area
  - Total: 29.848 sq mi (77.31 km^{2})
  - Land: 29.848 sq mi (77.31 km^{2})
  - Water: 0 sq mi (0 km^{2}) 0%

Population (2020)
  - Total: 1,656
  - Density: 55.48/sq mi (21.42/km^{2})
- Time zone: UTC-6 (CST)
  - Summer (DST): UTC-5 (CDT)
- Area code: 620
- GNIS feature ID: 477718

Medora Township is a township in Reno County, Kansas, United States. As of the 2020 census, its population was 1,656.

== Geography ==
Medora Township covers an area of 29.848 square miles (82.81 square kilometers).

=== Communities ===
- Medora

=== Adjacent townships ===
Little Valley Township, McPherson County
East Washington Township, Rice County	northwest	north	northeast	Superior Township, McPherson County
Grant Township, Reno County	west	self
Reno Township, Reno County	southwest	south	southeast	Little River Township, Reno County
Clay Township, Reno County

== Transportation ==
=== Major highways ===
- K-61
