= K-61 (Kansas highway) =

State highway in Kansas, U.S.

K-61
- K-61 highlighted in red

Route information
- Maintained by KDOT and the city of Hutchinson
- Length: 83.358 mi (134.152 km)
- Existed: c. 1928–present

Major junctions
- South end: US-54 / US-400 in Pratt
- US-50 by Partridge; K-14 / K-96 in South Hutchinson; US-50 in Hutchinson
- North end: I-135 / US-81 / US 81 Bus. south of McPherson

Location
- Country: United States
- State: Kansas
- Counties: Pratt, Reno, McPherson

Highway system
- Kansas State Highway System; Interstate; US; State; Spurs
← K-60	→ K-62

K-61 is a 83.358-mile-long (134.152 km) north–south state highway in central Kansas. K-61's southern terminus is at U.S. Route 54 (US-54) and US-400 on the east side of Pratt. The northern terminus is at Interstate 135 (I-135) and US-81 south of McPherson. The highway travels mostly through rural areas; however, it does pass through South Hutchinson and Hutchinson, where it intersects K-14, K-96, and US-50. K-61 is signed as a north–south but runs in southwest to northeast direction.

K-61 was established as a state highway by 1928. Throughout the 1940s and into 1950, the highway's alignment was straightened between Pratt and Hutchinson. In 1957, K-17 was truncated to end in Hutchinson. At this time K-61 was extended over K-17's former alignment to US-81 by McPherson. By the end of 1959, K-61's alignment had been straightened from Hutchinson to McPherson. Throughout the 1960s, the alignment was changed within the city of Hutchinson. By 1969, I-35W (modern I-135) had been built and K-61 extended to it. From 2009 to 2012, a new four-lane alignment was built between Hutchinson and McPherson.

== Route description ==
All but 1.851 miles (3 km) of K-61's alignment is maintained by the Kansas Department of Transportation (KDOT); the section of K-61 from US-50 north to East 30th Avenue within Hutchinson is maintained by the city. The entire length of K-61 is a part of the National Highway System, which is a system of highways important to the nation's defense, economy, and mobility. KDOT tracks the traffic levels on its highways, and in 2020, they determined that, on average, the traffic ranged from 1,890 vehicles per day southwest of Turon to 10,100 vehicles per day north of Avenue A in Hutchinson. The second highest was 7,690 vehicles per day near the northern terminus. K-61 travels in a southwest–northeast direction but is signed as north–south its entire length.

=== Pratt to Hutchinson ===
K-61's southern terminus is at U.S. Route 54 (US-54) and US-400 on the east edge of Pratt. The highway proceeds north as a divided highway, passing by Pratt Community Junior College, before intersecting NE 10th Street. Just past 10th, the highway transitions to two lanes and begins to curve northeast. K-61 begins to parallel a Union Pacific Railroad track and continues in a northeast direction. The highway continues through flat rural farmland to an intersection with NE 40th Avenue, which goes north to the small community of Natrona. The roadway proceeds northeast to a crossing over Silver Creek, before entering Preston. K-61 continues to NW 80th Street, where it exits the city. The roadway continues northeast through mostly flat farmland and soon enters into Reno County. K-61 continues into the county and soon enters Turon. The highway continues northeast out of the city, parallel to the railroad to a crossing over Wolf Creek, before entering Langdon.

The roadway exits the city and proceeds northeast to a junction with K-11. K-61 crosses over Skinnawah Creek, then enters Arlington. The highway crosses over the North Fork Ninnescah River before exiting the city. K-61 continues through rural farmland to a crossing over Irish Creek. The roadway proceeds northeast for a short distance and enters Partridge. K-61 exits the city and soon crosses over Red Rock Creek before reaching an incomplete interchange with US-50. Northbound K-61 can't access westbound US-50, and eastbound US-50 can't access southbound K-61. K-61 begins to overlap US-50 as they continue northeast and become a four-lane divided highway. The highway crosses Sand Creek then curves east and soon reaches half clover interchange with K-14 and K-96. K-14 and K-96 begin to overlap K-61 and US-50, as the four highways continue east. The highway enters South Hutchinson before reaching a diamond interchange, where K-14 and K-96 exit and travel south as K-61 and US-50 continue east.

=== Hutchinson to McPherson ===
K-61 and US-50 reach a diamond interchange with Scott Boulevard and McNew Road before curving northeast and crossing over the Arkansas River. K-61 splits from US-50 and turns north into Hutchinson as US-50 continues east. Within the Hutchinson city limits K-61 is signed as the Ken Kennedy Freeway. K-61 crosses over several railroad tracks before reaching a partial cloverleaf interchange with Avenue A. K-61 intersects Lorraine Street and 4th Avenue, curves northeast and intersects 17th Avenue near the Hutchinson Mall, then reaches an intersection with 30th Avenue, where it transitions to a (mostly) controlled-access highway. The highway continues northward to a diamond interchange with East 56th Avenue before curving northeast. It then reaches a diamond interchange with Medora Road, which travels east to Medora. K-61 crosses the Little Arkansas River then enters into McPherson County. K-61 continues through farmland to an at-grade intersection with Arapaho Road then another with Buckskin Road.

The roadway curves north and reaches a diamond interchange with Cherokee Road and Center Street, which travels east to Inman. The highway curves back northeast and proceeds past at-grade intersections with Chisholm Road and Comanche Road before reaching Groveland. K-61 then curves northeast and continues to an at-grade intersection with Eisenhower Road and a partial interchange with K-153, where northbound K-61 exits onto northbound K-153 and southbound K-153 exits onto southbound K-61. The highway continues through farmland to a partial interchange with K-153 Spur south of McPherson, where southbound K-61 exits onto northbound K-153 Spur and southbound K-153 Spur exits onto northbound K-61. The roadway crosses over a railroad track then reaches a partial cloverleaf interchange, where it begins a wrong-way overlap with US-81 Business. K-61 curves east and crosses over Dry Turkey Creek before reaching its northern terminus at a partial interchange with Interstate 135 (I-35) and US-81.

== History ==
=== Establishment and early realignments ===
K-61 was designated as a state highway by the State Highway Commission of Kansas (SHC) by 1928. At that time it began at US-54 by Cairo and travelled north through Preston. North of Preston, it turned east and soon entered Turon where it turned north. The highway continued northward and ended at US-50S (modern US-50) by Sylvia.

In a resolution on August 7, 1941, it was approved to build a new alignment of K-61 from Preston northeast to Turon. Prior to this, the highway followed Northeast 100th Avenue north from Preston to Northeast 110th Street, which it followed east to Preston. On August 20, 1941, it was approved to build a new alignment of K-61 from Turon northeast through Langdon, Arlington and Partridge to Hutchinson. Before this, K-61 proceeded north from Turon to US-50S by Sylvia. On July 26, 1946, the SHC approved bids for grading, surfacing, building of three bridges, and seeding the shoulders on the section between Turon and Langdon. In a resolution on August 28, 1946, it was approved to build a new alignment of K-61 from US-54 just east of Pratt northeast to Preston. Before this K-61 traveled directly south from Preston to US-54.

At the end of April and early May 1948, the SHC asked for bids to pave the new alignment from US-54 to southwest of Preston, and the section from Preston's east city limits northeast to Langdon's east city limits. On May 18, 1948, the SHC accepted a bid for the paving project. In the beginning of November 1948, the SHC asked for bids for grading, surfacing and bridges on a section of K-61 from slightly southwest of Arlington northeast for 2.6 miles (4.2 km). On the 26th of that month, the SHC approved a bid for the project to proceed. The section from US-54 to Preston was finished by the end of 1948. On February 8, 1949, the city of Preston approved a $4,000 (equivalent to $41,653 in 2024 dollars) bond to buy right-of-way for the section within the city. In May 1949, the SHC asked for bids for grading and surfacing from the north city limits of Preston southwest for two miles (3.2 km).

In early August 1949, the SHC asked for bids to build a section from Langdon northeast seven miles (11 km). On August 26, 1949, a bid was approved by the SHC for the segment to be built. In mid-April 1950, the unfinished section between Langdon and Arlington was opened to keep the dirt packed. Construction to finish the section was started in May 1950, with it being finished by summer that year. By September 28, 1950, this last section was almost completed. It had been supposed to open a few weeks earlier but was being delayed by rain, which was causing soft spots. The section opened to traffic the next day, which completed the new diagonal route between Pratt and Hutchinson.

=== Extension to McPherson ===
K-61 originally ended in Hutchinson at US-50. On February 2, 1957, it was approved to truncate K-17 to Hutchinson and to extend K-61 along the former K-17 to US-81 in McPherson. From Hutchinson, it went northeast to Medora then turned east. K-61 continued east to Buhler, where it turned north. The highway continued north to Inman where it turned east. K-61 continued east to 14th Avenue then turned north and terminated at US-81 south of McPherson. At this time the SHC began to plan on building a direct diagonal route between Hutchinson and McPherson. In mid February, the cities of McPherson, Hutchinson, and Pratt requested that K-61 and K-17 from Hutchinson to McPherson be given a Federal route number. This never happened and it remained the way the SHC planned. In mid-August 1957, the new diagonal section between Inman and Medora was opened to traffic.

On February 12, 1958, it was approved to build a new alignment of K-61 from Inman directly northeast to McPherson. At the end of March, the SHC approved bids for grading of the section and for building three bridges on the project. On July 8, 1958, the SHC asked for bids for a base and surfacing of this new section. A few weeks later, the SHC approved a bid for paving the section of K-61. The new diagonal section between McPherson and Inman was opened to traffic on August 6, 1959.

=== Hutchinson rerouting ===
In 1961, K-61 entered South Hutchinson from the west on Blanchard Avenue. It then turned north onto Main Street and crossed Arkansas River into Hutchinson. The highway continued north on Main to 30th Avenue where it curved east then northeast toward McPherson. At the end of May 1961, the SHC announced a project to for grading and a bridge on a new alignment of K-61 from what is now US-50 north to Avenue G in Hutchinson. Also a project for grading and bridges on a new alignment of K-61 and US-50 from K-17 to where K-61 currently turns north off US-50. Both projects were expected to begin after July 1 that year. On June 27, 1963, the SHC asked for bids for concrete pavement on the section of K-61 and US-50 and the section of K-61 from US-50 north to G Avenue. The next month a bid was approved for the concrete paving on both projects.

By 1965, the section between US-50 and 4th Avenue had been opened. By 1967, K-61 was taken off of 30th Avenue and Main Street in Hutchinson. At this time the section between US-50 and Avenue G, and the section between 4th Avenue and 30th Avenue was four-lane. In mid May 1967, the SHC approved a bid for a project to add frontage roads at the junction with US-50 and to improve the intersections with 17th Street and 30th Street in Hutchinson. By 1971, the new four-lane section of K-61 and US-50 from K-96 west had been opened to traffic. By 1975, the entire section of K-61 from US-50 north in Hutchinson was four lanes.

=== Extension to I-35W ===
K-61 originally ended at US-81 southwest of McPherson. In January 1965, construction plans were agreed on so that right-of-way acquisitions could proceed on the extension of K-61 to the new I-35W. In a resolution on August 24, 1966, it was approved to build I-35W (modern I-135) to the east of McPherson and realign US-81 onto it, to extend K-61 to the new I-35W, and to eliminate US-81 Alternate. Also in the resolution, the former section of US-81 from the new K-61 alignment north to US-56 remained in the state highway system. The section of former K-61 from the new K-61 to US-81, and former section of US-81 from there north to US-56 became K-61 Spur. The remaining section of US-81 was designated as K-61 Connector. The city of McPherson complained about the removal of US-81 Alternate. Then in a resolution passed on March 29, 1967, it was approved to re-establish US-81 Alternate in McPherson. In a resolution on August 28, 1968, it was approved to renumber K-61 Alternate to K-153, and K-61 Spur to K-153 Spur.

On December 19, 1967, the SHC asked for bids to build the extension of K-61 that will link to the new I-35W. Bids were approved for grading, building nine bridges, and seeding the shoulders. On May 23, 1968, the SHC asked for bids to build a bridge to complete the interchange between I-35W and K-61. By the next month, work was progressing rapidly on the project. At the end of July 1968, the SHC approved a bid to pave the new stretch of roadway. By July 1969, the new I-35W had been built from the Saline-McPherson county line north to K-61. Also the section of the K-61 extension was opened from Main Street (modern US-81 Bus.) to I-35W.

On November 20, 1969, the SHC asked for bids for improvements on a section from US-54 north for 1.3 miles (2.1 km). At the end of that month, the SHC asked for bids to add lighting at the interchange with US-81 Business and the interchange with I-35W. On September 13, 1976, I-35W was renumbered to I-135. In an AASHTO meeting on October 13, 1979, it was approved to redesignate US-81 Alternate as US-81 Business within McPherson. The redesignation was approved by KDOT on April 1, 1981.

=== Improvements ===
As early as September 1964, the section of K-61 between Hutchinson and McPherson was planned to become a four-lane freeway. In a resolution passed on September 9, 2009, it was approved to rebuild and realign K-61 in Reno and McPherson counties from Hutchinson northeast to the junction with K-153 Spur. The new alignment of K-61 would be built as a four-lane divided highway with some intersections changed to grade-separated interchanges, and the number of at-grade intersections reduced. The original route went through Medora and Inman, but the new route would bypass both, west of its original route.

In October 2011, the section of K-61 in McPherson County opened to traffic, and it was announced that the section in Reno County would open next year. On May 5, 2012, the new section in Reno County opened to traffic, with southbound traffic switching over around 12 p.m. and northbound traffic switching over at 3 p.m.; the pedestrian bridge over the highway was completed later in 2012. The $105.3 million (equivalent to $142 million in 2024 dollars) project was completed by Koss Construction of Topeka. In 2013, the new section of the highway was designated the John Neal Memorial Highway in memory of a major advocate of the project.

== Major intersections ==
At-grade intersections without major highway designations are not listed here. All exits are unnumbered.

County	Location	mi	km	Destinations	Notes
Pratt	Pratt	0.000	0.000	US-54 / US-400 – Kingman, Greensburg	Southern terminus
Reno	Arlington Township	34.119	54.909	K-11 south – Kingman	Northern terminus of K-11; former K-14 south
Reno	Arlington	35.264	56.752	North Howard Street	Former K-14 north
Reno	Center Township	44.893	72.248	US-50 west – Kinsley	Southern end of US-50 concurrency; southern end of expressway section; partial interchange; southbound exit and northbound entrance
Reno	Reno Township	50.401	81.113	K-14 north / K-96 west – Lyons	Southern end of K-14/K-96 concurrency; half clover interchange
Reno	South Hutchinson	51.913	83.546	K-14 south / K-96 east / Main Street north – Wichita, Reno County Museum	Northern end of K-14/K-96 concurrency; diamond interchange
Reno	South Hutchinson	52.896	85.128	Scott Boulevard / McNew Road	Diamond interchange
Reno	Hutchinson	54.020	86.937	US-50 east – Newton	Northern end of US-50 concurrency; diamond interchange
Reno	Hutchinson	55.620	89.512	Avenue A	Partial cloverleaf interchange
Reno	Clay–Medora township line	96.509	155.316	E. 56th Avenue – Sand Hills State Park	Diamond interchange
Reno	Medora	64.100	103.159	Medora Road / E. 85th Avenue – Medora, Buhler	Diamond interchange
McPherson	Inman	70.668	113.729	Cherokee Road (CR 446) – Inman	Diamond interchange
McPherson	King City Township	78.771	126.770	K-153 north – McPherson	Southern terminus of K-153; partial interchange; northbound exit and southbound entrance
McPherson	King City Township	80.546	129.626	K-153 Spur north – McPherson	Southern terminus of K-153 Spur; partial interchange; southbound exit and northbound entrance; former US-81
McPherson	King City Township	80.796	130.029	US 81 Bus. north – McPherson	Southern end of US-81 Bus. concurrency; partial cloverleaf interchange
McPherson	King City Township	83.358	134.152	US 81 Bus. ends / I-135 / US-81 – Wichita, Salina	Northern terminus; northern end of US-81 Bus. concurrency; I-135 exit 58; partial interchange
1.000 mi = 1.609 km; 1.000 km = 0.621 mi: Concurrency terminus; Incomplete access
