= K-17 (Kansas highway) =

Former highway in Kansas, United States

K-17
- K-17 highlighted in red

Route information
- Maintained by KDOT
- Length: 21.138 mi (34.018 km)
- Existed: 1932–2012
- History: Redesignated as K-14

Major junctions
- South end: US-54 / US-400 south of Waterloo
- North end: K-96 south of South Hutchinson

Location
- Country: United States
- State: Kansas
- Counties: Kingman, Reno

Highway system
- Kansas State Highway System; Interstate; US; State; Spurs
← K-16	→ K-18

K-17 was a 21.138-mile-long (34.018 km) state highway in Kansas that served Kingman and Reno counties. The route originated at an intersection with U.S. Route 54 (US-54) and US-400 south of the unincorporated community of Waterloo and ended at K-96 south of South Hutchinson. The road was maintained by the Kansas Department of Transportation (KDOT), and was a two-lane road for its entire length. The entirety of this portion of the route is now designated as a part of K-14.

The route was designated in 1932. When originally designated, K-17 ran north to an intersection with US-81 near McPherson. Between 1957 and 1962, a series of changes to the route shortened it and brought its northern terminus to an intersection with K-96 near South Hutchinson. The route was decommissioned in 2012.

== Route description ==
K-17 began at a diamond interchange with US-54 and US-400 near Waterloo in Kingman County and ran north on a two-lane road. The route passed a cemetery just north of its southern terminus and continued north through level farmland, entering Reno County and passing a few miles east of the community of Pretty Prairie, which was accessible by a county road. North of here, K-17 crossed the north fork of the Ninnescah River and curved slightly to the northwest. The route bent back to the north and continued in that direction for approximately eight miles (13 km) before twisting to the east and reaching its northern terminus at an intersection with K-96.

K-17 was maintained by KDOT. In 2012, KDOT calculated the route's average annual daily traffic to be about 1000 vehicles near its southern terminus, and approximately 1600 vehicles near the northern terminus. K-17 was not included in the National Highway System, a system of highways important to the nation's defense, economy, and mobility.

== History ==
K-17 was commissioned by 1932. Originally, the route went through Hutchinson and ended at US-81 south of McPherson. Only the portion from just south of Hutchinson to the city of Medora was paved. The remainder of the route was gravel. Within a year, the segment from Medora to the route's northern terminus had been paved with a bituminous surface. Between 1933 and 1936, a stretch of the route in Reno County was also given a bituminous surface. In 1940, the route was extended north from its northern terminus along the route of US-81 to an intersection with K-4 in Saline County. By this time, all segments of the route had been paved. The majority of the route had a bituminous surface, but some segments had a hard surface. Between 1941 and 1945, the whole route was paved with a hard surface.

In 1957, the portion of K-17 from its intersection with K-61 to its northern terminus was redesignated as an extension of K-61. This realignment removed K-17 from McPherson and Saline counties. In 1962, K-96 was realigned through Hutchinson and replaced a portion of K-17 south of the city. This shortened K-17 yet again to its final northern terminus at an intersection with K-96. In 1977, the southern terminus was upgraded to an interchange as US-54 was upgraded to a freeway in much of eastern Kingman County. In 2012, K-17 was decommissioned when KDOT realigned a number of state highways in Reno and Kingman counties. The former alignment of K-17 was re-designated as a segment of K-14.

== Major intersections ==
County	Location	mi	km	Destinations	Notes
Kingman	Waterloo	0.000	0.000	US-54 / US-400 – Kingman, Wichita	Southern terminus
Reno	Hutchinson	21.138	34.018	K-96 – Hutchinson, Wichita	Northern terminus
1.000 mi = 1.609 km; 1.000 km = 0.621 mi
