= K-11 (Kansas highway) =

State highway in Kansas, U.S.

K-11
- K-11 highlighted in red

Route information
- Maintained by KDOT
- Length: 16.662 mi (26.815 km)
- Existed: 2013–present

Major junctions
- South end: US-54 / US-400 near Kingman
- North end: K-61 near Arlington

Location
- Country: United States
- State: Kansas
- Counties: Kingman, Reno

Highway system
- Kansas State Highway System; Interstate; US; State; Spurs
| ← K-10 | → K-12 |

K-11 is a 16.662-mile-long (26.815 km) state highway in the U.S. state of Kansas, and uses parts of what was formerly K-14 before K-14 was realigned. K-11's southern terminus is at U.S. Route 54 (US-54) and US-400 west of Kingman, and the northern terminus is at K-61 west of Arlington.

== Route description ==
K-11 begins at US-54 and US-400, which run concurrently east–west, between Kingman and Cunningham in north central Kingman County. The highway heads north along a section line road. K-11 passes 2 miles (3.2 km) east of the Charles M. Prather Barn and crosses Smoots Creek, a tributary of the South Fork Ninnescah River. The highway enters Reno County, where it crosses Goose Creek and Wolf Creek, both tributaries of the North Fork Ninnescah River. K-11 reaches its northern terminus west of the city of Arlington just south of a Union Pacific Railroad line at an intersection with K-61 between Partridge and Langdon.

== History ==
K-11 was designated along what is now K-99 in 1927. In 1938, K-11 was renumbered to K-99 to match Oklahoma. In 1940, another K-11 was created from Kiowa to the Oklahoma border as a replacement of a part of K-8, which was truncated because of the extension of U.S. Route 281 into Kansas. In December 1959, K-11 was cancelled and transferred back to K-8. In 2013, K-14 was realigned to the now defunct K-17, and K-11 took over a section of original K-14 alignment.

== Major intersections ==
| County | Location | mi | km | Destinations | Notes |
|---|---|---|---|---|---|
| Kingman | Ninnescah–Hoosier township line | 0.000 | 0.000 | US-54 / US-400 – Kingman, Wichita, Pratt | Southern terminus |
| Reno | Arlington | 16.662 | 26.815 | K-61 – Pratt, Hutchinson | Northern terminus |
1.000 mi = 1.609 km; 1.000 km = 0.621 mi
