= Lincoln Township, Reno County, Kansas =

Township in Reno County, Kansas, U.S.

Lincoln Township
- Township
- Location within Reno County
- Coordinates: 37.962401°N 97.986591°W
- Country: United States
- State: Kansas
- County: Reno
- Established: 1873

Government
  - District 2 County Commissioner: Ron Hirst

Area
  - Total: 35.255 sq mi (91.31 km^{2})
  - Land: 35.236 sq mi (91.26 km^{2})
  - Water: 0.019 sq mi (0.049 km^{2}) 0.05%

Population (2020)
  - Total: 618
  - Density: 17.5/sq mi (6.77/km^{2})
- Time zone: UTC-6 (CST)
  - Summer (DST): UTC-5 (CDT)
- Area code: 620
- GNIS feature ID: 1729703

Lincoln Township is a township in Reno County, Kansas, United States. As of the 2020 census, its population was 618.

== History ==
The first township in Reno County was Reno Township, which covered the whole county upon its creation in 1872. Lincoln Township was created from part of Reno Township in 1873. Yoder Township was created from Lincoln Township in the 1910s as well.

== Geography ==
Lincoln Township covers an area of 35.255 square miles (91.31 square kilometers).

=== Communities ===
- Darlow

=== Adjacent townships ===
Reno Township, Reno County
Salt Creek Township, Reno County	northwest	north
Center Township, Reno County	west	self	east	Yoder Township, Reno County
Troy Township, Reno County	southwest	south
Castleton Township, Reno County

== Transportation ==
=== Major highways ===
- US-50
- K-14
- K-61
- K-96
