= Sumner Township, Reno County, Kansas =

Township in Reno County, Kansas, U.S.

Sumner Township
- Township
- Location within Reno County
- Coordinates: 37.785551°N 97.745216°W
- Country: United States
- State: Kansas
- County: Reno
- Established: 1877

Government
  - District 5 County Commissioner: Don Bogner

Area
  - Total: 43.445 sq mi (112.52 km^{2})
  - Land: 40.598 sq mi (105.15 km^{2})
  - Water: 2.847 sq mi (7.37 km^{2}) 6.55%

Population (2020)
  - Total: 644
  - Density: 15.9/sq mi (6.12/km^{2})
- Time zone: UTC-6 (CST)
  - Summer (DST): UTC-5 (CDT)
- Area code: 316 and 620
- GNIS feature ID: 473807

Sumner Township is a township in Reno County, Kansas, United States. As of the 2020 census, its population was 644.

== History ==
The first township in Reno County was Reno Township, which covered the whole county upon its creation in 1872. Haven Township was established later in 1872 from parts of Reno Township, and then in 1877 Sumner Township would be created from part of Haven Township. The first settler in what was to be Sumner Township was John L. Gill, who settled in the area in March 1872. Sumner Township is home to the former town of Ost, also called St. Joseph, and had a large German Catholic community. Ost was incorporated from 1882–1911 and had a peak population of 150 people.

== Geography ==
Sumner Township covers an area of 43.445 square miles (112.52 square kilometers). Part of Cheney Reservoir lies within the township.

=== Adjacent townships ===
Haven Township, Reno County
		north	northeast	Greeley Township, Sedgwick County
Ninnescah Township, Reno County	west	self	east	Sherman Township, Sedgwick County
Evan Township, Kingman County	southwest	south	southeast	Garden Plain Township, Sedgwick County
Grand Center Township, Sedgwick County
