= Uptown Hutch =

- Location: Hutchinson, Kansas, U.S.
- Coordinates: 38.0649°N 97.9014°W
- Address: 1500 E 11th Ave, Hutchinson, KS 67501
- Opened: 1986
- Closed: March 23, 2026 (indoor; exterior shop and anchor still open)
- Previous names: Hutchinson Mall
- Developer: Melvin Simon & Associates
- Manager: Crystal Vinduska, General Manager
- Owner: Rockstep Hutchinson, LLC
- Num. of stores: 15 (more than 50 at its peak)
- Num. of anchor tenants: 5 (1 vacant)
- Floor area: 603,162 square feet (56,035.6 m^{2})
- Floors: 1
- Public transit: Rcat

Uptown Hutch, formerly Hutchinson Mall, is a shopping mall in Hutchinson, Kansas, U.S. Built in 1986, it features Bomgaars, Hobby Lobby, Dunham's Sports, TJ Maxx, Hutch Vintage Market, and Ollie's Bargain Outlet as its anchor stores.

== History ==
Melvin Simon & Associates (now Simon Property Group) first confirmed the mall's development in 1983. Upon opening in March 1985, the mall had six anchor stores: JCPenney, Sears, Dillard's, Service Merchandise, Walmart, and Newman's. Major tenants of the mall upon opening included KB Toys, Kinney Shoes, Claire's, Zales Jewelers, Regis Salon, and B. Dalton. Walmart left the mall in 1994 in favor of a larger store to the northeast. By the end of the year, their former location at the mall was sold to Hobby Lobby. Also by this point, Newman's had closed and was replaced by a larger movie theater, while the existing one inside the mall was converted to additional stores.

In March 2012, Dillards announced that they would close in June of that year. In January 2014, Sears announced that they would close their store at the mall by April as Sears decided to not renew their lease. During the summer of 2016, Dunham's Sports began hiring for a store the company would put in the mall by October that would replace the Sears. In February 2017, JCPenney announced that the company would be closing their location at the Hutchinson Mall. At the time of JCPenney's closure, the mall had 36 vacant store fronts. In 2021, the former location of JCPenney was subdivided between Ollie's Bargain Outlet and an antique shop called Hutch Vintage Market. The interior portion of the mall closed beginning March 23, 2026, as part of a transition to a new shopping format, while exterior-facing stores remained open.
