= Darlow, Kansas =

Unincorporated community in Reno County, Kansas

Coordinates: 37°56′27″N 97°57′00″W

Darlow is an unincorporated community in Lincoln Township, Reno County, Kansas, United States. It is located several miles west of Yoder along Red Rock Road.

== History ==
Darlow was a station on the Atchison, Topeka and Santa Fe Railway.

Darlow had a post office from 1890 until 1935, but it was called Booth until 1900.

== Education ==
The community is served by Haven USD 312 public school district.

== Transportation ==
The Atchison, Topeka and Santa Fe Railway formerly provided passenger rail service to Darlow on a line between Hutchinson and Ponca City. Dedicated passenger service was provided until at least 1954, while mixed trains continued until at least 1961. As of 2025, the nearest passenger rail station is located in Hutchinson, where Amtrak's Southwest Chief stops once daily on a route from Chicago to Los Angeles.
