= Sand Hills State Park =

State park in Kansas, United States

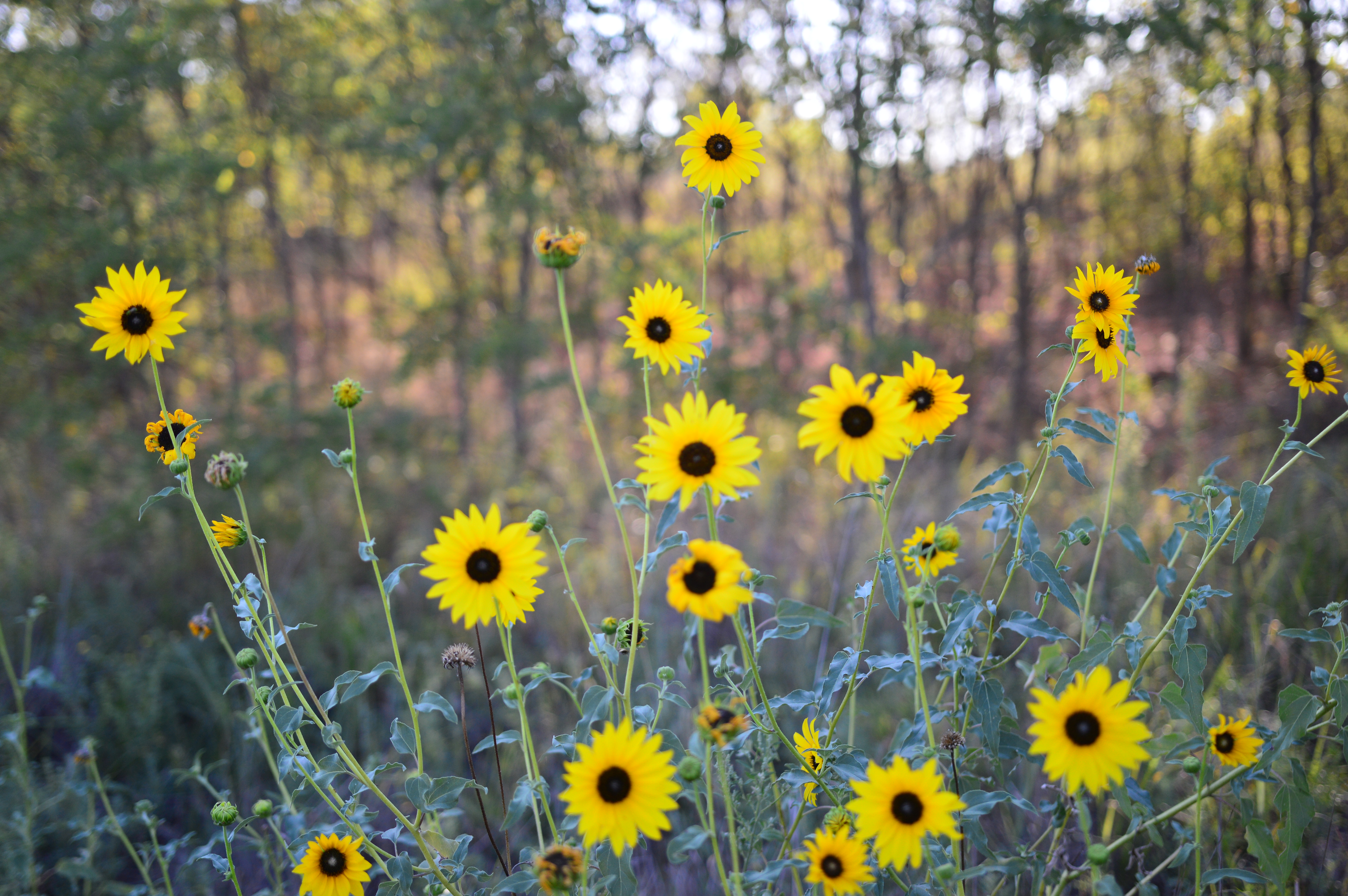
- Wildflowers in Sand Hills State Park

- Location within Kansas Location within the United States
- Interactive map of Sand Hills State Park
- Location: Reno County, Kansas, United States
- Coordinates: 38°07′00″N 97°50′40″W
- Area: 1,123 acres (454 ha) (1,172 acres (474 ha))
- Elevation: 1,550 ft (470 m)
- Established: 1974
- Administrator: Kansas Department of Wildlife and Parks
- Visitors: 138,616 (in 2022)
- Website: Official website
- Kansas State Parks

Sand Hills State Park is located north of the city of Hutchinson in Reno County, Kansas, United States. The park is a preserved natural area with sand dunes, grasslands, wetlands, and woodlands and trails for hiking and horseback riding.

== History ==
In 1974, the Kansas Park and Resources Authority acquired 640 acres (260 ha) from the Kansas State Industrial Reformatory. This section of land became the 22nd state park in Kansas by a House Bill signed by Governor Robert Docking. Shortly after this transfer, the Dillon Family of Hutchinson donated an adjacent 320 acres (130 ha). With the donation, the Kansas Park and Resources Authority was able to acquire another adjacent 163 acres (66 ha) with Federal Land and Water Funds, thus establishing the present 1,123 acres (454 ha) Sand Hills State Park.

== Geography ==
The park is located east of Kansas State Highway 61 about 6 miles (9.7 km) north of Hutchinson in northeastern Reno County, Kansas. It is situated along the northern edge of the Hutchinson Dune Tract, which consists of rolling sand dunes from 10 to 40 feet (3.0 to 12.2 m) high that are mostly stabilized by prairie grass vegetation. The dunes were formed by windblown deposits of sand transported from the Arkansas River at the end of the last glacial period.

== See also ==
- Nebraska Sandhills
- Monahans Sandhills State Park
- Blowout (geology)
- Sand dune ecology
- Big Basin Prairie Preserve
