= Albion Township, Reno County, Kansas =

Township in Reno County, Kansas, U.S.

Albion Township
- Township
- Location within Reno County
- Coordinates: 37.780104°N 97.963809°W
- Country: United States
- State: Kansas
- County: Reno
- Established: 1878

Government
  - District 2 County Commissioner: Ron Hirst

Area
  - Total: 37.63 sq mi (97.5 km^{2})
  - Land: 37.579 sq mi (97.33 km^{2})
  - Water: 0.051 sq mi (0.13 km^{2}) 0.14%

Population (2020)
  - Total: 821
  - Density: 21.8/sq mi (8.44/km^{2})
- Time zone: UTC-6 (CST)
  - Summer (DST): UTC-5 (CDT)
- Area code: 620 and 316
- GNIS feature ID: 473790

Albion Township is a township in Reno County, Kansas, United States. As of the 2020 census, its population was 821.

== History ==
The first township in Reno County was Reno Township, which covered the whole county upon its creation in 1872. Later in the year it split into other townships, including Castleton Township. It was from Castleton Township that Albion Township was created from in 1878.

== Geography ==
Albion Township covers an area of 37.63 square miles (97.5 square kilometers).

=== Communities ===
- part of Pretty Prairie

=== Adjacent townships ===
Castleton Township, Reno County
		north
Roscoe Township, Reno County	west	self	east	Ninnescah Township, Reno County
White Township, Kingman County	southwest	south	southeast	Evan Township, Kingman County
Galesburg Township, Kingman County

== Transportation ==
=== Major highways ===
- K-14
