= Reno County Area Transit =

Public transportation provider in Reno County, Kansas

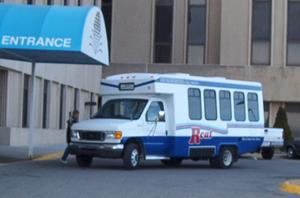
- Headquarters: 120 W. Avenue B
- Locale: Hutchinson, KS
- Service area: Reno County, Kansas
- Service type: bus service, paratransit
- Website: Reno County Area Transit (RCAT)

Reno County Area Transit, known as Rcat, provides public transportation for the citizens of Reno County, Kansas. Fixed route and paratransit operations serve urban Hutchinson and South Hutchinson. A more flexible service, which requires 24 hours advance notice, is provided for the rural communities of the county, with a free transfer to city routes.
