= Greeley Township, Sedgwick County, Kansas =

Township in Sedgwick County, Kansas, U.S.

Greeley Township Sedgwick County, Kansas
- Township
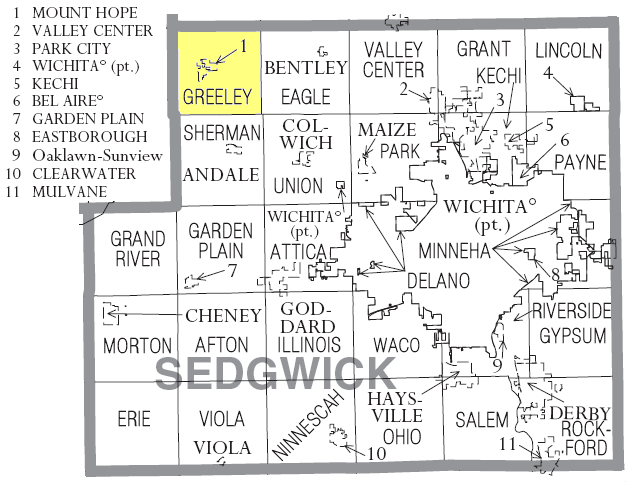
- Location within Sedgwick County

- Location within state of Kansas
- Coordinates: 37°52′10″N 97°38′46″W
- Country: United States
- State: Kansas
- County: Sedgwick
- Founded: 1872
- Named for: Horace Greeley

Government
  - District 3 County Commissioner: Stephanie Wise

Area
  - Total: 36.30 sq mi (94.0 km^{2})
  - Land: 35.79 sq mi (92.7 km^{2})
  - Water: 0.51 sq mi (1.3 km^{2})
- Elevation: 1,431 ft (436 m)

Population (2020)
  - Total: 1,049
  - Density: 29.31/sq mi (11.32/km^{2})
- Time zone: UTC-6 (CST)
  - Summer (DST): UTC-5 (CDT)
- Area code: 316
- FIPS code: 20-28400
- GNIS ID: 473826

Greeley Township is a township in Sedgwick County, Kansas, United States. As of the 2020 census, its population was 1,049.

== History ==
Greeley Township was established in 1872. The first settler in what was to become Greeley Township was J. Lumbert, who settled there in 1871. The township was named after Horace Greeley.

== Geography ==
The Arkansas River flows through the township, as well as Gar Creek.

=== Communities ===
- Mount Hope

=== Adjacent townships ===
Lake Township, Harvey County
Valley Township, Reno County	northwest	north	northeast	Lakin Township, Harvey County
Haven Township, Reno County	west	self	east	Eagle Township, Sedgwick County
Sumner Township, Reno County	southwest	south
Sherman Township, Sedgwick County

== Transportation ==
=== Major highways ===
- K-96
