= Valley Township, Reno County, Kansas =

Township in Reno County, Kansas, U.S.

Valley Township
- Township
- Location within Reno County
- Coordinates: 38.008964°N 97.751314°W
- Country: United States
- State: Kansas
- County: Reno
- Established: 1872

Government
  - District 5 County Commissioner: Don Bogner

Area
  - Total: 55.659 sq mi (144.16 km^{2})
  - Land: 55.27 sq mi (143.1 km^{2})
  - Water: 0.389 sq mi (1.01 km^{2}) 0.70%

Population (2020)
  - Total: 835
  - Density: 15.1/sq mi (5.83/km^{2})
- Time zone: UTC-6 (CST)
  - Summer (DST): UTC-5 (CDT)
- Area code: 620
- GNIS feature ID: 473669

Valley Township is a township in Reno County, Kansas, United States. As of the 2020 census, its population was 835.

== History ==
The first township in Reno County was Reno Township, which covered the whole county upon its creation in 1872. Later in the year Valley Township would be organized from part of Reno Township.

== Geography ==
Valley Township covers an area of 55.659 square miles (144.16 square kilometers). The Arkansas River flows through it.

=== Adjacent townships ===
Little River Township, Reno County
		north	northeast	Burrton Township, Harvey County
Clay Township, Reno County	west	self	east	Lake Township, Harvey County
Yoder Township, Reno County	southwest	south	southeast	Greeley Township, Sedgwick County
Haven Township, Reno County

== Transportation ==
=== Major highways ===
- US-50
