= Roscoe Township, Reno County, Kansas =

Township in Reno County, Kansas, U.S.

Roscoe Township
- Township
- Location within Reno County
- Coordinates: 37.778996°N 98.082218°W
- Country: United States
- State: Kansas
- County: Reno
- Established: 1879

Government
  - District 2 County Commissioner: Ron Hirst

Area
  - Total: 37.83 sq mi (98.0 km^{2})
  - Land: 37.83 sq mi (98.0 km^{2})
  - Water: 0 sq mi (0 km^{2}) 0%

Population (2020)
  - Total: 132
  - Density: 3.49/sq mi (1.35/km^{2})
- Time zone: UTC-6 (CST)
  - Summer (DST): UTC-5 (CDT)
- Area code: 620
- GNIS feature ID: 473787

Roscoe Township is a township in Reno County, Kansas, United States. As of the 2020 census, its population was 132.

== History ==
The first township in Reno County was Reno Township, which covered the whole county upon its creation in 1872. In 1874, Troy Township was split off from Reno Township. Roscoe Township was created from Troy Township later in 1879.

== Geography ==
Roscoe Township covers an area of 37.83 square miles (98.0 square kilometers).

=== Communities ===
- part of Pretty Prairie

=== Adjacent townships ===
Troy Township, Reno County
		north	northeast	Castleton Township, Reno County
Loda Township, Reno County	west	self	east	Albion Township, Reno County
Hoosier Township, Kingman County	southwest	south	southeast	Galesburg Township, Kingman County
White Township, Kingman County
