= Ninnescah Township, Reno County, Kansas =

Township in Reno County, Kansas, U.S.

Ninnescah Township
- Township
- Location within Reno County
- Coordinates: 37.756814°N 97.860543°W
- Country: United States
- State: Kansas
- County: Reno

Government
  - District 5 County Commissioner: Don Bogner

Area
  - Total: 40.94 sq mi (106.0 km^{2})
  - Land: 30.459 sq mi (78.89 km^{2})
  - Water: 10.481 sq mi (27.15 km^{2}) 25.60%

Population (2020)
  - Total: 247
  - Density: 8.11/sq mi (3.13/km^{2})
- Time zone: UTC-6 (CST)
  - Summer (DST): UTC-5 (CDT)
- Area code: 316 and 620
- GNIS feature ID: 485526

Ninnescah Township is a township in Reno County, Kansas, United States. As of the 2020 census, its population was 247.

== Names ==
Ninnescah Township has also been called "Ninnescah River Township," "Ne-nescah River Township," and "Ninnescau River Township."

== Geography ==
Ninnescah Township covers an area of 40.94 square miles (106.0 square kilometers). Most of Cheney Reservoir lies within the township, with the North Fork Ninnescah River flowing into it.

=== Adjacent townships ===
Haven Township, Reno County
Castleton Township, Reno County	northwest	north
Albion Township, Reno County	west	self	east	Sumner Township, Reno County
Galesburg Township, Kingman County	southwest	south	southeast	Grand River Township, Sedgwick County
Evan Township, Kingman County
