= Yoder Township, Kansas =

Township in Reno County, Kansas, U.S.

Yoder Township
- Township
- Location within Reno County
- Coordinates: 37.962818°N 97.876104°W
- Country: United States
- State: Kansas
- County: Reno
- Established: 1910s

Government
  - District 5 County Commissioner: Don Bogner

Area
  - Total: 37.632 sq mi (97.47 km^{2})
  - Land: 37.212 sq mi (96.38 km^{2})
  - Water: 0.42 sq mi (1.1 km^{2}) 1.17%

Population (2020)
  - Total: 815
  - Density: 21.9/sq mi (8.46/km^{2})
- Time zone: UTC-6 (CST)
  - Summer (DST): UTC-5 (CDT)
- Area code: 620
- GNIS feature ID: 473647

Yoder Township is a township in Reno County, Kansas, United States. As of the 2020 census, its population was 815.

== History ==
The first township in Reno County was Reno Township, which covered the whole county upon its creation in 1872. Clay Township and Haven Township were split off from Reno Township later in the year, while Lincoln Township was split off from Reno Township in 1873. Yoder Township was formed from parts of Clay Township, Haven Township, and Lincoln Township in the 1910s.

== Geography ==
Yoder Township covers an area of 37.632 square miles (94.74 square kilometers). The Arkansas River flows through it.

=== Communities ===
- Yoder

=== Adjacent townships ===
Clay Township, Reno County
| Reno Township, Reno County | northwest | north | northeast | Valley Township, Reno County |
| Lincoln Township, Reno County | west | self |
| | | south | southeast | Haven Township, Reno County |
Castleton Township, Reno County

== Transportation ==
=== Major highways ===
- K-96
