= Haven USD 312 =

Public school district in Haven, Kansas

Address
- 414 W. Main St. Haven, Kansas, 67543; United States
- Coordinates: 37°54′4″N 97°47′14″W

District information
- Type: Public
- Grades: K to 12
- Schools: 3

Other information
- Website: havenschools.com

Haven USD 312 is a public unified school district headquartered in Haven, Kansas, United States. The district includes the communities of Darlow, Haven, Mount Hope, Partridge, Yoder, and nearby rural areas.

== Schools ==
The school district operates the following schools:

- Haven High School
- Haven Middle School
- Haven Grade School

== See also ==
- Kansas State Department of Education
- Kansas State High School Activities Association
- List of high schools in Kansas
- List of unified school districts in Kansas
