= Sylvia, Kansas =

City in Reno County, Kansas

- City
- Location within Reno County and Kansas

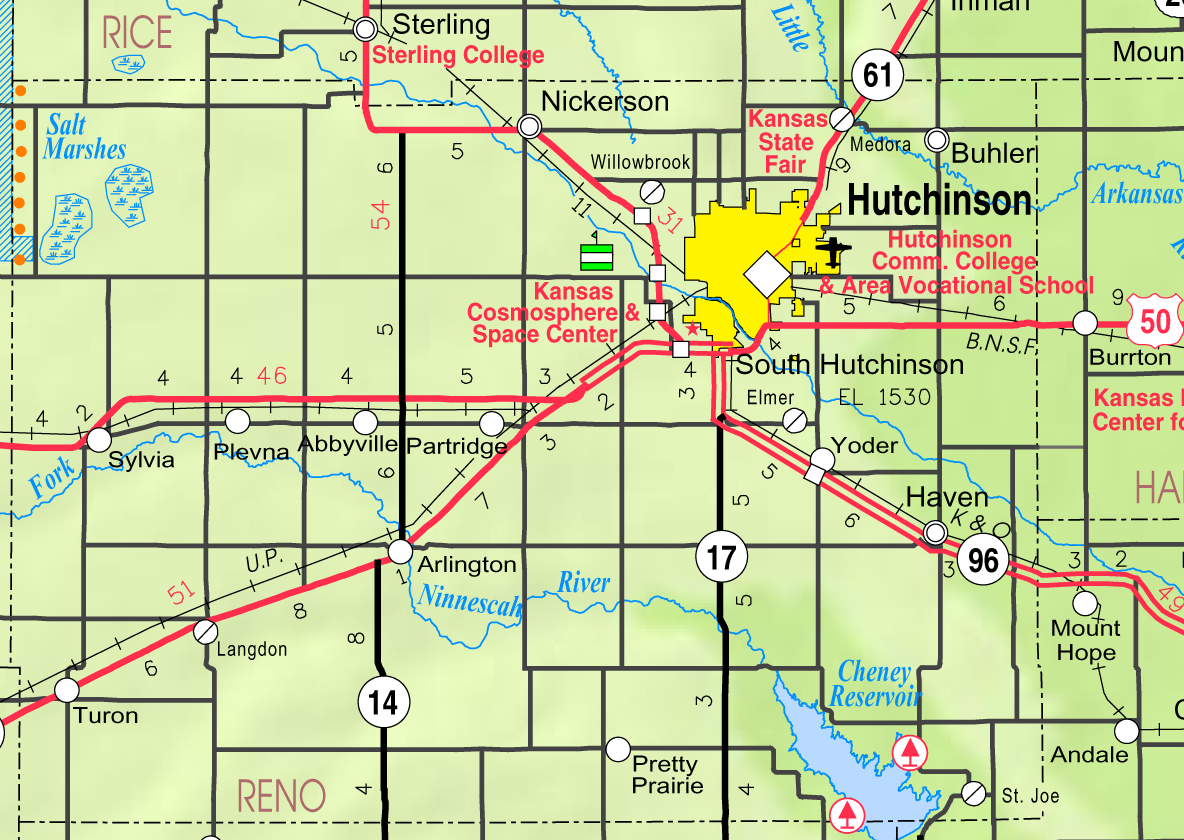
- KDOT map of Reno County (legend)
- Coordinates: 37°57′32″N 98°24′31″W
- Country: United States
- State: Kansas
- County: Reno
- Founded: 1874
- Incorporated: 1887

Area
  - Total: 0.29 sq mi (0.75 km^{2})
  - Land: 0.29 sq mi (0.75 km^{2})
  - Water: 0 sq mi (0.00 km^{2})
- Elevation: 1,736 ft (529 m)

Population (2020)
  - Total: 215
  - Density: 740/sq mi (290/km^{2})
- Time zone: UTC-6 (CST)
  - Summer (DST): UTC-5 (CDT)
- ZIP Code: 67581
- Area code: 620
- FIPS code: 20-69800
- GNIS ID: 2396021
- Website: sylviaks.com

Sylvia is a city in Reno County, Kansas, United States. As of the 2020 census, the population of the city was 215.

== History ==
Sylvia was originally called Zenith, and was founded under that name in 1874. It was renamed Sylvia in 1886, perhaps named for the wife and daughter of a railroad employee.

The local high school football team was on the losing side of a lopsided football game against another school from across the county in Haven. Played in 1927 with a final score of 256–0, the game produced multiple state high school records.

== Geography ==
According to the United States Census Bureau, the city has a total area of 0.29 square miles (0.75 km^{2}), all land.

== Demographics ==
Historical population
Census	Pop.	Note	%±
1890	205		—
1900	220		7.3%
1910	634		188.2%
1920	542		−14.5%
1930	540		−0.4%
1940	477		−11.7%
1950	496		4.0%
1960	402		−19.0%
1970	390		−3.0%
1980	353		−9.5%
1990	308		−12.7%
2000	297		−3.6%
2010	218		−26.6%
2020	215		−1.4%
U.S. Decennial Census

=== 2010 census ===
As of the census of 2010, there were 218 people, 97 households, and 58 families residing in the city. The population density was 751.7 inhabitants per square mile (290.2/km^{2}). There were 142 housing units at an average density of 489.7 per square mile (189.1/km^{2}). The racial makeup of the city was 95.4% White, 0.5% from other races, and 4.1% from two or more races. Hispanic or Latino people of any race were 5.0% of the population.

There were 97 households, of which 24.7% had children under the age of 18 living with them, 47.4% were married couples living together, 4.1% had a female householder with no husband present, 8.2% had a male householder with no wife present, and 40.2% were non-families. 34.0% of all households were made up of individuals, and 12.4% had someone living alone who was 65 years of age or older. The average household size was 2.25 and the average family size was 2.79.

The median age in the city was 45.7 years. 25.2% of residents were under the age of 18; 4.1% were between the ages of 18 and 24; 19.7% were from 25 to 44; 28% were from 45 to 64; and 22.9% were 65 years of age or older. The gender makeup of the city was 53.7% male and 46.3% female.

=== 2000 census ===
As of the census of 2000, there were 297 people, 122 households, and 84 families residing in the city. The population density was 1,034.5 inhabitants per square mile (399.4/km^{2}). There were 142 housing units at an average density of 494.6 per square mile (191.0/km^{2}). The racial makeup of the city was 96.97% White, 0.34% Native American, 1.01% Asian, 0.67% from other races, and 1.01% from two or more races. Hispanic or Latino people of any race were 1.68% of the population.

There were 122 households, out of which 30.3% had children under the age of 18 living with them, 59.8% were married couples living together, 5.7% had a female householder with no husband present, and 31.1% were non-families. 29.5% of all households were made up of individuals, and 17.2% had someone living alone who was 65 years of age or older. The average household size was 2.43 and the average family size was 2.94.

In the city, the population was spread out, with 27.6% under the age of 18, 7.4% from 18 to 24, 23.2% from 25 to 44, 20.9% from 45 to 64, and 20.9% who were 65 years of age or older. The median age was 40 years. For every 100 females, there were 94.1 males. For every 100 females age 18 and over, there were 93.7 males.

The median income for a household in the city was $29,167, and the median income for a family was $38,125. Males had a median income of $38,958 versus $17,813 for females. The per capita income for the city was $17,322. About 4.4% of families and 4.4% of the population were below the poverty line, including 4.3% of those under the age of eighteen and 6.3% of those 65 or over.

== Education ==
The community is served by Fairfield USD 310 public school district.

The Sylvia High School Mustangs won the Kansas State High School boys class B Track & Field championship in 1960.

== Notable people ==
- Alva Duer, basketball coach, born in Sylvia and a member of the Naismith Basketball Hall of Fame and College Basketball Hall of Fame; longtime coach at Pepperdine

== See also ==
- Quivira National Wildlife Refuge
