= Clay Township, Reno County, Kansas =

Township in Reno County, Kansas, U.S.

Clay Township
- Township
- Location within Reno County
- Coordinates: 38.031924°N 97.83981°W
- Country: United States
- State: Kansas
- County: Reno
- Established: 1872

Government
  - Districts 3 and 5 County Commissioners: Ron Vincent and Don Bogner

Area
  - Total: 30.568 sq mi (79.17 km^{2})
  - Land: 30.021 sq mi (77.75 km^{2})
  - Water: 0.547 sq mi (1.42 km^{2}) 1.79%

Population (2020)
  - Total: 1,986
  - Density: 66.15/sq mi (25.54/km^{2})
- Time zone: UTC-6 (CST)
  - Summer (DST): UTC-5 (CDT)
- Area code: 620
- GNIS feature ID: 473660

Clay Township is a township in Reno County, Kansas, United States. As of the 2020 census, its population was 1,986.

== History ==
The first township in Reno County was Reno Township, which covered the whole county upon its creation in 1872. Later in the year Clay Township was split off from it. In the 1910s, Yoder Township was split off from Clay Township.

== Geography ==
Clay Township covers an area of 30.568 square miles (79.17 square kilometers). The Arkansas River flows through it. Clay Township is also home to Sand Hills State Park.

=== Adjacent townships ===
Reno Township, Reno County	northwest		northeast	Medora Township, Reno County
		self	east	Little River Township, Reno County
Yoder Township, Reno County	southwest		southeast	Valley Township, Reno County

== Transportation ==
=== Major highways ===
- US-50
- K-61
