= Arlington Township, Kansas =

Township in Reno County, Kansas, U.S.

Arlington Township
- Township
- Location within Reno County
- Coordinates: 37.861953°N 98.202381°W
- Country: United States
- State: Kansas
- County: Reno

Government
  - District 2 County Commissioner: Ron Hirst

Area
  - Total: 36.169 sq mi (93.68 km^{2})
  - Land: 36.168 sq mi (93.67 km^{2})
  - Water: 0.001 sq mi (0.0026 km^{2}) 0%

Population (2020)
  - Total: 558
  - Density: 15.4/sq mi (5.96/km^{2})
- Time zone: UTC-6 (CST)
  - Summer (DST): UTC-5 (CDT)
- Area code: 620
- GNIS feature ID: 473619

Arlington Township is a township in Reno County, Kansas, United States. As of the 2020 census, its population was 558.

== Geography ==
Arlington Township covers an area of 36.169 square miles (93.68 square kilometers). The North Fork Ninnescah River flows through it.

=== Communities ===
- Arlington

=== Adjacent townships ===
Westminster Township, Reno County
| Plevna Township, Reno County | northwest | north | northeast | Center Township, Reno County |
| Langdon Township, Reno County | west | self | east | Troy Township, Reno County |
| Bell Township, Reno County | southwest | south |
Loda Township, Reno County

== Transportation ==
=== Major highways ===
- K-11
- K-61
