= White Township, Kansas =

White Township
- Township
- Location in Kingman County
- Coordinates: 37°41′10″N 98°04′31″W
- Country: United States
- State: Kansas
- County: Kingman

Area
  - Total: 33.64 sq mi (87.13 km^{2})
  - Land: 33.64 sq mi (87.13 km^{2})
  - Water: 0 sq mi (0 km^{2}) 0%
- Elevation: 1,565 ft (477 m)

Population (2020)
  - Total: 363
  - Density: 10.8/sq mi (4.17/km^{2})
- GNIS feature ID: 0473960

White Township is a township in Kingman County, Kansas, United States. As of the 2020 census, its population was 363.

== Geography ==
White Township covers an area of 33.64 square miles (87.13 square kilometers). Lakes in this township include Lakin Lake.

=== Communities ===
- Varner

=== Adjacent townships ===
- Roscoe Township, Reno County (north)
- Albion Township, Reno County (northeast)
- Galesburg Township (east)
- Dale Township (southeast)
- Ninnescah Township (south and southwest)
- Hoosier Township (west)
- Loda Township, Reno County (northwest)

=== Major highways ===
- U.S. Route 54
