= Haven Township, Kansas =

Township in Reno County, Kansas, U.S.

Haven Township
- Township
- Location within Reno County
- Coordinates: 37.8895°N 97.784503°W
- Country: United States
- State: Kansas
- County: Reno
- Established: 1872

Government
  - District 5 County Commissioner: Don Bogner

Area
  - Total: 55.463 sq mi (143.65 km^{2})
  - Land: 55.227 sq mi (143.04 km^{2})
  - Water: 0.236 sq mi (0.61 km^{2}) 0.43%

Population (2020)
  - Total: 1,551
  - Density: 28.08/sq mi (10.84/km^{2})
- Time zone: UTC-6 (CST)
  - Summer (DST): UTC-5 (CDT)
- Area code: 620
- GNIS feature ID: 473808

Haven Township is a township in Reno County, Kansas, United States. As of the 2020 census, its population was 1,551.

== History ==
The first township in Reno County was Reno Township, which covered the whole county upon its creation in 1872. Haven Township was separated from it later in the year, as well as including territory from Sedgwick County. The now extinct town of Mount Liberty was located in Haven Township; it's post office was closed in 1886. In the 1910s, Yoder Township was split off from Haven Township.

== Geography ==
Haven Township covers an area of 55.463 square miles (143.65 square kilometers). The Arkansas River flows through it.

=== Communities ===
- Haven

=== Adjacent townships ===
Valley Township, Reno County
Yoder Township, Reno County	northwest	north
Castleton Township, Reno County	west	self	east	Greeley Township, Sedgwick County
Ninnescah Township, Reno County	southwest	south
Sumner Township, Reno County

== Transportation ==
=== Major highways ===
- K-96
