= Yoder, Kansas =

Unincorporated community in Reno County, Kansas

- CDP
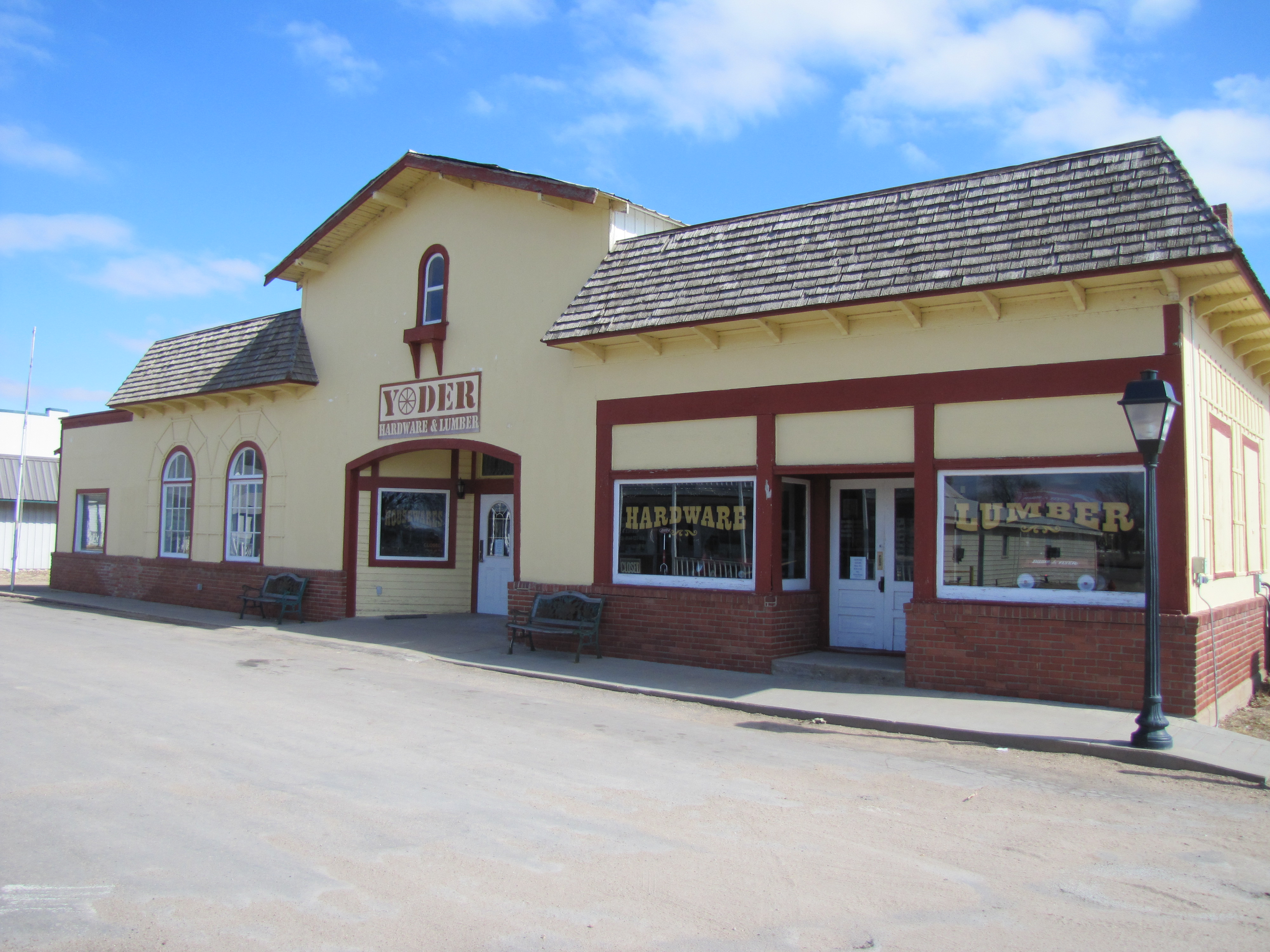
- Hardware & Lumber (2014)

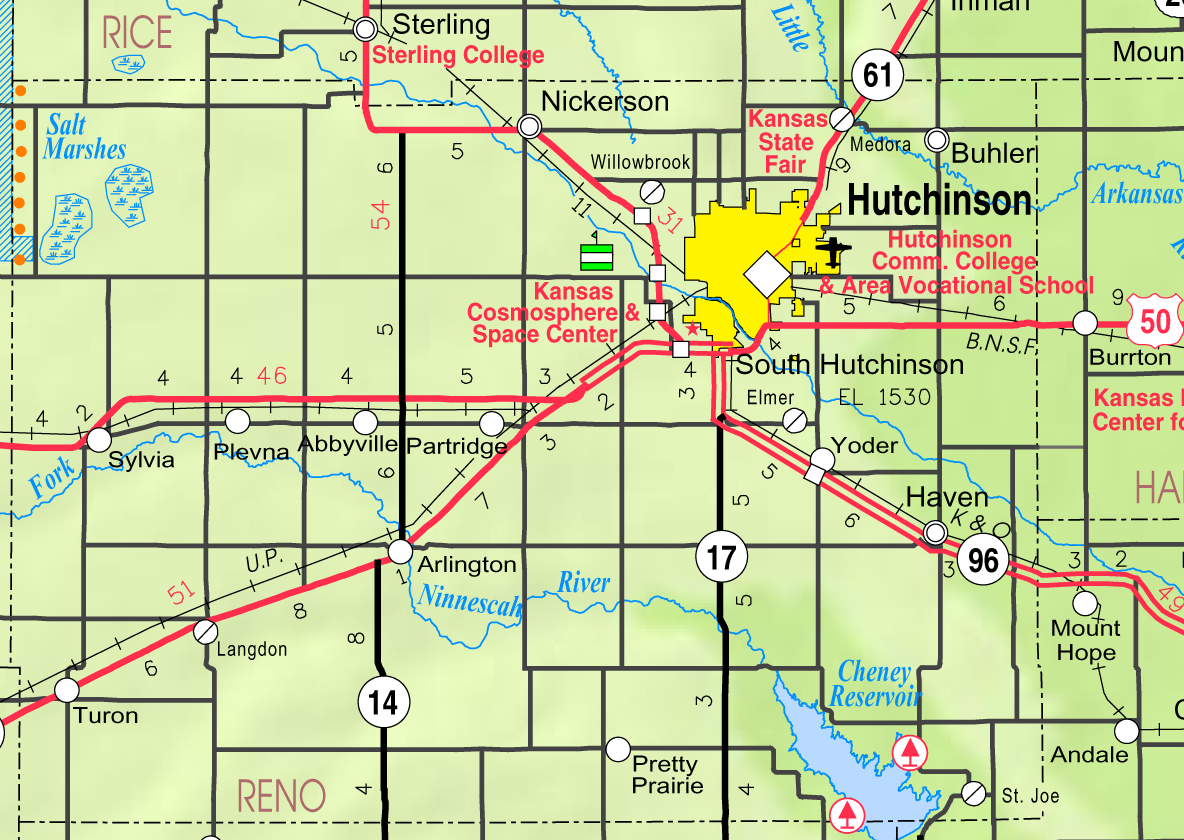
- KDOT map of Reno County (legend)

- Location within Kansas Location within the United States
- Coordinates: 37°56′25″N 97°52′6″W
- Country: United States
- State: Kansas
- County: Reno
- Township: Yoder
- Founded: 1889
- Named for: Valentine Yoder

Area
  - Total: 37.6 sq mi (97.5 km^{2})
  - Land: 37.3 sq mi (96.5 km^{2})
  - Water: 0.39 sq mi (1.0 km^{2})
- Elevation: 1,539 ft (469 m)

Population (2020)
  - Total: 165
  - Density: 4.43/sq mi (1.71/km^{2})
- Time zone: UTC-6 (CST)
  - Summer (DST): UTC-5 (CDT)
- ZIP Code: 67585
- Area code: 620
- FIPS code: 20-80750
- GNIS ID: 473653
- Website: yoderkansas.com

Yoder is a census-designated place (CDP) in Reno County, Kansas, United States. As of the 2020 census, the population was 165. It is located approximately 10 miles southeast of the city of Hutchinson on K-96. Yoder is the hub of a local Amish community.

== History ==
The community derives its name from its Amish founder, Valentine Yoder.

The first post office in Yoder was established in November 1889. Although Yoder is unincorporated, with no city government, it does have a U.S. Post Office and its own ZIP Code (67585).

The community was home to the former Naval Air Station Hutchinson, later renamed to Hutchinson Air Force Station, and currently named as Sunflower Aerodrome Gliderport.

== Geography ==
=== Climate ===
The climate in this area is characterized by hot, humid summers and generally mild to cool winters. According to the Köppen Climate Classification system, Yoder has a humid subtropical climate, abbreviated "Cfa" on climate maps.

== Demographics ==
Historical population
Census	Pop.	Note	%±
2010	194		—
2020	165		−14.9%
U.S. Decennial Census

== Education ==
The community is served by Haven USD 312 public school district.

== Area events ==
Yoder Heritage Day takes place annually on the fourth Saturday in August.

== Gallery ==
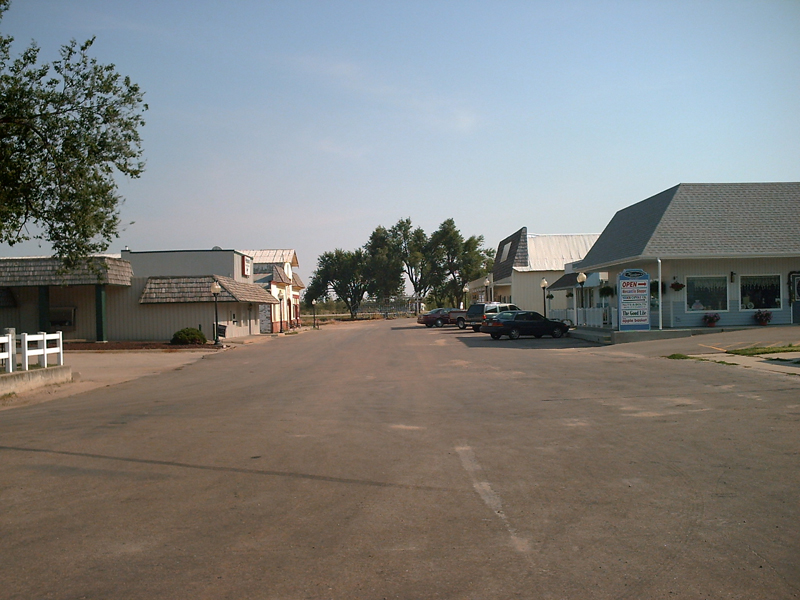
Looking south down Main Street (2006)

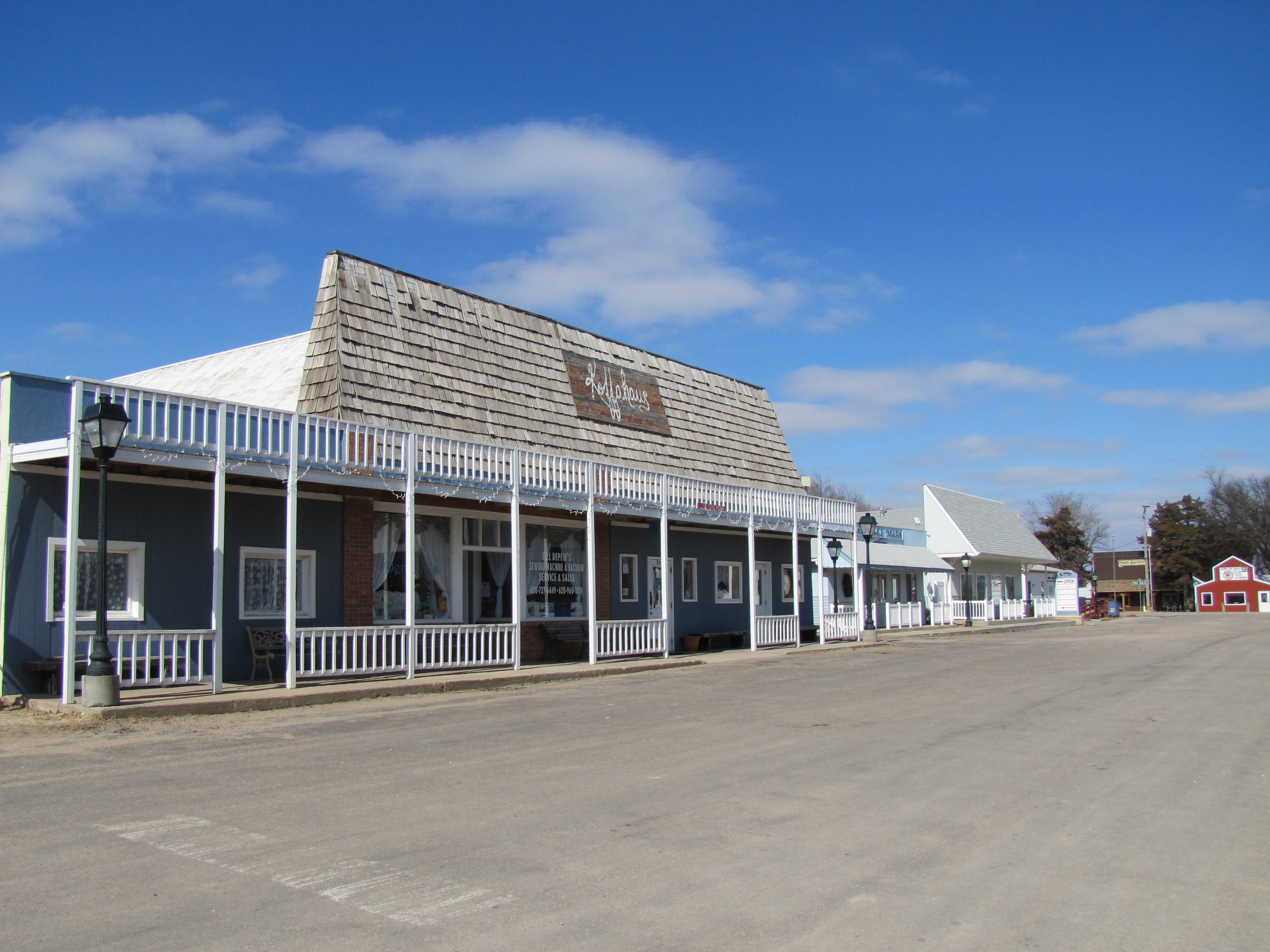
Demelia's Quilt Co (2014)

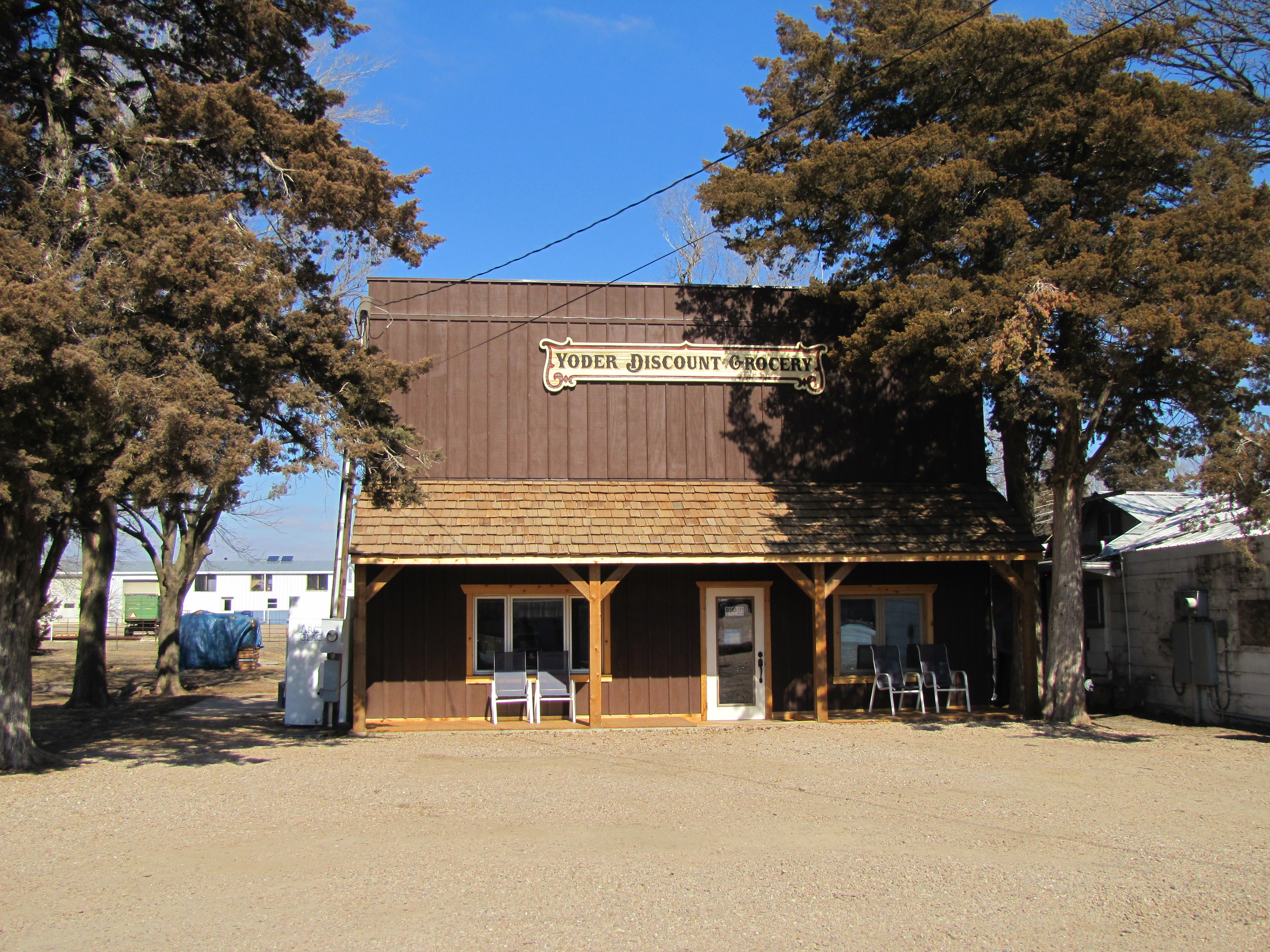
Discount Grocery (2014)

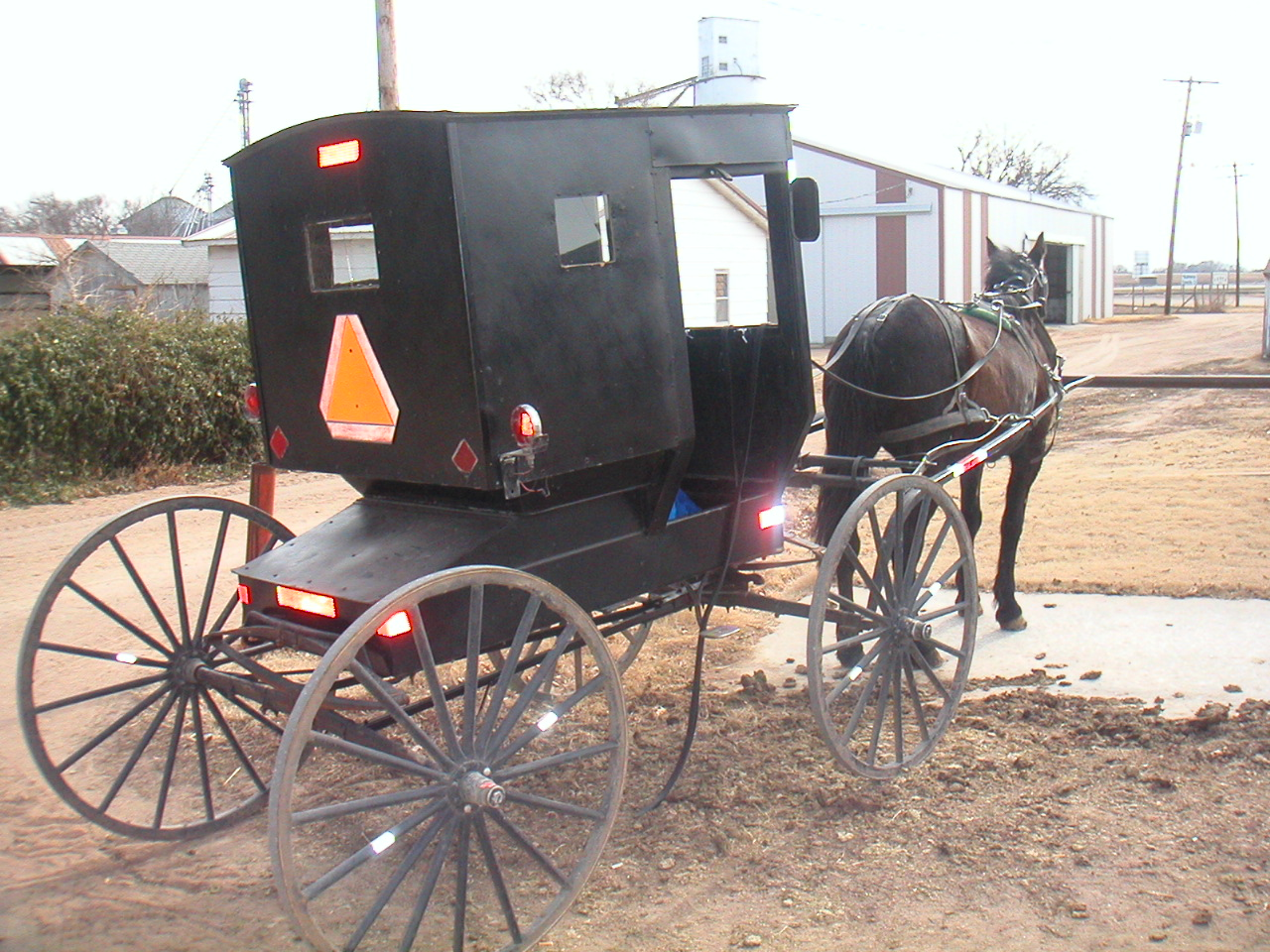
Horse-drawn carriage (2003)
