= Huntsville Township, Kansas =

Township in Reno County, Kansas, U.S.

Huntsville Township
- Township
- Location within Reno County
- Coordinates: 38.035532°N 98.298331°W
- Country: United States
- State: Kansas
- County: Reno

Government
  - District 2 County Commissioner: Ron Hirst

Area
  - Total: 36.291 sq mi (93.99 km^{2})
  - Land: 36.249 sq mi (93.88 km^{2})
  - Water: 0.042 sq mi (0.11 km^{2}) 0.12%

Population (2020)
  - Total: 111
  - Density: 3.06/sq mi (1.18/km^{2})
- Time zone: UTC-6 (CST)
  - Summer (DST): UTC-5 (CDT)
- Area code: 620
- GNIS feature ID: 473605

Huntsville Township is a township in Reno County, Kansas, United States. As of the 2020 census, its population was 111.

== Geography ==
Huntsville Township covers an area of 36.291 square miles (93.99 square kilometers).

=== Communities ===
- Huntsville

=== Adjacent townships ===
Walnut Township, Reno County
		north	northeast	Medford Township, Reno County
Huntsville Township, Reno County	west	self	east	Enterprise Township, Reno County
Sylvia Township, Reno County	southwest	south	southeast	Westminster Township, Reno County
Plevna Township, Reno County
