= Center Township, Reno County, Kansas =

Township in Reno County, Kansas, U.S.

Center Township
- Township
- Location within Reno County
- Coordinates: 37.961312°N 98.08033°W
- Country: United States
- State: Kansas
- County: Reno
- Established: 1873

Government
  - District 2 County Commissioner: Ron Hirst

Area
  - Total: 36.208 sq mi (93.78 km^{2})
  - Land: 36.171 sq mi (93.68 km^{2})
  - Water: 0.037 sq mi (0.096 km^{2}) 0.10%

Population (2020)
  - Total: 587
  - Density: 16.2/sq mi (6.27/km^{2})
- Time zone: UTC-6 (CST)
  - Summer (DST): UTC-5 (CDT)
- Area code: 620
- GNIS feature ID: 473631

Center Township is a township in Reno County, Kansas, United States. As of the 2020 census, its population was 587.

== History ==
The first township in Reno County was Reno Township, which covered the whole county upon its creation in 1872. In 1873, Center Township was split off from Reno Township. A year later, in 1874, Westminster Township was split off from Center Township.

== Geography ==
Center Township covers an area of 36.208 square miles (93.78 square kilometers).

=== Communities ===
- Partridge

=== Adjacent townships ===
Salt Creek Township, Reno County
Enterprise Township, Reno County	northwest	north	northeast	Reno Township, Reno County
Westminster Township, Reno County	west	self	east	Lincoln Township, Reno County
Arlington Township, Reno County	southwest	south	southeast	Castleton Township, Reno County
Troy Township, Reno County

== Transportation ==
=== Major highways ===
- US-50
- K-61
