= Medora, Kansas =

Unincorporated community in Reno County, Kansas

Coordinates: 38°08′56″N 97°50′44″W

Medora is an unincorporated community in Reno County, Kansas, United States. It is located northeast of Hutchinson next to K-61 highway.

== History ==
Medora had a post office from 1878 until 1988, but the post office was called Leslie until 1887.

== Education ==
The community is served by Buhler USD 313 public school district.
