= Burrton Township, Kansas =

Township in Kansas, United States

Burrton Township Harvey County, Kansas
- Township
- Location within Harvey County

- Location within state of Kansas
- Coordinates: 38°2′35″N 97°38′51″W
- Country: United States
- State: Kansas
- County: Harvey

Area
  - Total: 36.05 sq mi (93.38 km^{2})
  - Land: 35.99 sq mi (93.22 km^{2})
  - Water: 0.062 sq mi (0.16 km^{2}) 0.17%
- Elevation: 1,450 ft (440 m)

Population (2020)
  - Total: 1,057
  - Density: 29.37/sq mi (11.34/km^{2})
- Time zone: UTC-6 (CST)
  - Summer (DST): UTC-5 (CDT)
- FIPS code: 20-09600
- GNIS ID: 473675
- Website: County website

Burrton Township is a township in Harvey County, Kansas, United States. As of the 2020 census, its population was 1,057.

== History ==
Burrton Township was named for I. T. Burr, a railroad official.

== Geography ==
Burrton Township covers an area of 36.05 square miles (93.4 km^{2}) and contains one incorporated settlement, Burrton.
