= Enterprise Township, Reno County, Kansas =

Township in Reno County, Kansas, U.S.

Enterprise Township
- Township
- Location within Reno County
- Coordinates: 38.038974°N 98.19002°W
- Country: United States
- State: Kansas
- County: Reno
- Established: 1879

Government
  - District 2 County Commissioner: Ron Hirst

Area
  - Total: 36.039 sq mi (93.34 km^{2})
  - Land: 36.029 sq mi (93.31 km^{2})
  - Water: 0.01 sq mi (0.026 km^{2}) 0.03%

Population (2020)
  - Total: 130
  - Density: 3.6/sq mi (1.4/km^{2})
- Time zone: UTC-6 (CST)
  - Summer (DST): UTC-5 (CDT)
- Area code: 620
- GNIS feature ID: 473617

Enterprise Township is a township in Reno County, Kansas, United States. As of the 2020 census, its population was 130.

== History ==
The first township in Reno County was Reno Township, which covered the whole county upon its creation in 1872. In 1874, Medford Township was created from Reno Township as well as some land in Rice County. Enterprise Township was made in 1879 after being split off from Medford Township.

== Geography ==
Enterprise Township covers an area of 36.039 square miles (93.34 square kilometers).

=== Adjacent townships ===
Medford Township, Reno County
Walnut Township, Reno County	northwest	north
Huntsville Township, Reno County	west	self	east	Salt Creek Township, Reno County
Plevna Township, Reno County	southwest	south	southeast	Center Township, Reno County
Westminster Township, Reno County
