= Salt Creek Township, Reno County, Kansas =

Township in Reno County, Kansas, U.S.

Salt Creek Township
- Township
- Location within Reno County
- Coordinates: 38.065292°N 98.090681°W
- Country: United States
- State: Kansas
- County: Reno
- Established: 1879

Government
  - District 2 County Commissioner: Ron Hirst

Area
  - Total: 54.063 sq mi (140.02 km^{2})
  - Land: 54.029 sq mi (139.93 km^{2})
  - Water: 0.034 sq mi (0.088 km^{2}) 0.06%

Population (2020)
  - Total: 455
  - Density: 8.42/sq mi (3.25/km^{2})
- Time zone: UTC-6 (CST)
  - Summer (DST): UTC-5 (CDT)
- Area code: 620
- GNIS feature ID: 473630

Salt Creek Township is a township in Reno County, Kansas, United States. As of the 2020 census, its population was 455.

== History ==
The first township in Reno County was Reno Township, which covered the whole county upon its creation in 1872. Salt Creek was split off from Reno Township in 1879.

== Geography ==
Salt Creek Township covers an area of 54.063 square miles (140.02 square kilometers). The Arkansas River flows through it.

=== Adjacent townships ===
Grant Township, Reno County
Sterling Township, Rice County	northwest	north
Enterprise Township, Reno County; Medford Township, Reno County	west	self	east	Reno Township, Reno County
Westminster Township, Reno County	southwest	south	southeast	Lincoln Township, Reno County
Center Township, Reno County
