= Arlington, Kansas =

City in Reno County, Kansas

- City
- Location within Reno County and Kansas

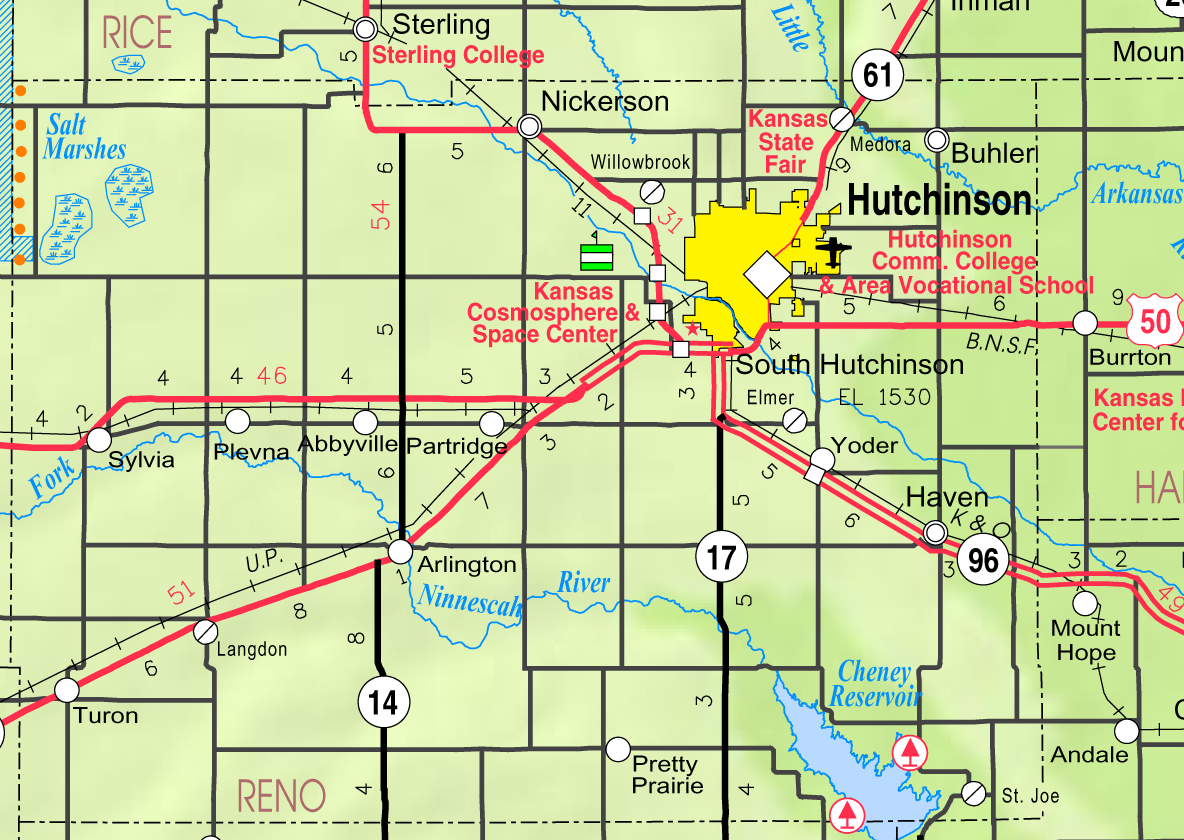
- KDOT map of Reno County (legend)
- Coordinates: 37°53′47″N 98°10′41″W
- Country: United States
- State: Kansas
- County: Reno
- Founded: 1877
- Incorporated: 1887
- Named for: Arlington, Massachusetts

Area
  - Total: 1.23 sq mi (3.19 km^{2})
  - Land: 1.23 sq mi (3.19 km^{2})
  - Water: 0 sq mi (0.00 km^{2})
- Elevation: 1,595 ft (486 m)

Population (2020)
  - Total: 435
  - Density: 353/sq mi (136/km^{2})
- Time zone: UTC-6 (CST)
  - Summer (DST): UTC-5 (CDT)
- ZIP Code: 67514
- Area code: 620
- FIPS code: 20-02325
- GNIS ID: 2393987

Arlington is a city in Reno County, Kansas, United States. As of the 2020 census, the population of the city was 435.

== History ==
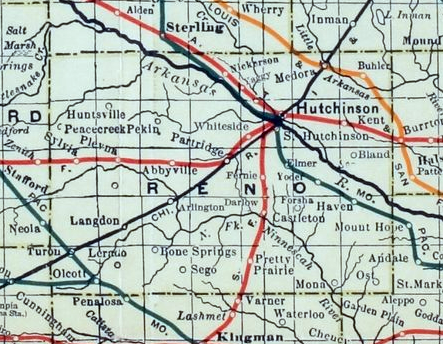
1915 railroad map of Reno County

Arlington was founded in 1877. It was named after Arlington, Massachusetts. The first post office in Arlington was established in February 1878.

In 1887, the Chicago, Kansas and Nebraska Railway built a main line from Herington through Arlington to Pratt. In 1888, this line was extended to Liberal. Later, it was extended to Tucumcari, New Mexico and El Paso, Texas. It foreclosed in 1891 and taken over by Chicago, Rock Island and Pacific Railway, which shut down in 1980, reorganized as Oklahoma, Kansas and Texas Railroad, merged in 1988 with Missouri Pacific Railroad, and merged in 1997 with Union Pacific Railroad. Most locals still refer to this railroad as the "Rock Island".

In 1980, Arlington (with 503 residents at the time) was profiled by the Associated Press as a town that "has not had a murder in its entire history". The police chief at the time, Ralph Almquist, had been hired in 1974, marking the first time that Arlington had had a full-time police force, and boasted that "We don't have any murders here because I don't allow crime."

== Geography ==
According to the United States Census Bureau, the city has a total area of 1.07 square miles (2.77 km^{2}), all land.

== Demographics ==
Historical population
Census	Pop.	Note	%±
1900	312		—
1910	450		44.2%
1920	500		11.1%
1930	501		0.2%
1940	440		−12.2%
1950	405		−8.0%
1960	466		15.1%
1970	503		7.9%
1980	631		25.4%
1990	457		−27.6%
2000	459		0.4%
2010	473		3.1%
2020	435		−8.0%
U.S. Decennial Census

=== 2020 census ===
The 2020 United States census counted 435 people, 196 households, and 116 families in Arlington. The population density was 352.8 per square mile (136.2/km^{2}). There were 230 housing units at an average density of 186.5 per square mile (72.0/km^{2}). The racial makeup was 91.72% (399) white or European American (89.43% non-Hispanic white), 0.69% (3) black or African-American, 0.46% (2) Native American or Alaska Native, 0.0% (0) Asian, 0.0% (0) Pacific Islander or Native Hawaiian, 1.61% (7) from other races, and 5.52% (24) from two or more races. Hispanic or Latino of any race was 5.06% (22) of the population.

Of the 196 households, 27.6% had children under the age of 18; 43.4% were married couples living together; 26.0% had a female householder with no spouse or partner present. 33.7% of households consisted of individuals and 17.3% had someone living alone who was 65 years of age or older. The average household size was 2.5 and the average family size was 3.1. The percent of those with a bachelor's degree or higher was estimated to be 9.9% of the population.

23.0% of the population was under the age of 18, 6.2% from 18 to 24, 23.7% from 25 to 44, 26.9% from 45 to 64, and 20.2% who were 65 years of age or older. The median age was 39.8 years. For every 100 females, there were 99.5 males. For every 100 females ages 18 and older, there were 95.9 males.

The 2016–2020 5-year American Community Survey estimates show that the median household income was $31,058 (with a margin of error of +/- $5,969) and the median family income was $31,250 (+/- $18,039). Males had a median income of $35,167 (+/- $29,983) versus $30,469 (+/- $16,890) for females. The median income for those above 16 years old was $31,125 (+/- $13,969). Approximately, 31.5% of families and 32.8% of the population were below the poverty line, including 40.2% of those under the age of 18 and 18.8% of those ages 65 or over.

=== 2010 census ===
As of the census of 2010, there were 473 people, 200 households, and 124 families residing in the city. The population density was 442.1 inhabitants per square mile (170.7/km^{2}). There were 231 housing units at an average density of 215.9 per square mile (83.4/km^{2}). The racial makeup of the city was 98.3% White, 0.6% African American, 0.2% Native American, and 0.8% from two or more races. Hispanic or Latino people of any race were 1.3% of the population.

There were 200 households, of which 31.0% had children under the age of 18 living with them, 48.0% were married couples living together, 11.0% had a female householder with no husband present, 3.0% had a male householder with no wife present, and 38.0% were non-families. 32.5% of all households were made up of individuals, and 12% had someone living alone who was 65 years of age or older. The average household size was 2.37 and the average family size was 3.02.

The median age in the city was 37.4 years. 26.6% of residents were under the age of 18; 7.8% were between the ages of 18 and 24; 22.8% were from 25 to 44; 25.4% were from 45 to 64; and 17.5% were 65 years of age or older. The gender makeup of the city was 50.1% male and 49.9% female.

== Education ==
The community is served by Fairfield USD 310 public school district. Before the creation of USD 310, the old Arlington High School mascot was the Warriors. In 2015, there was a fire at the Arlington School.
