= Partridge, Kansas =

City in Reno County, Kansas

- City
- Location within Reno County and Kansas

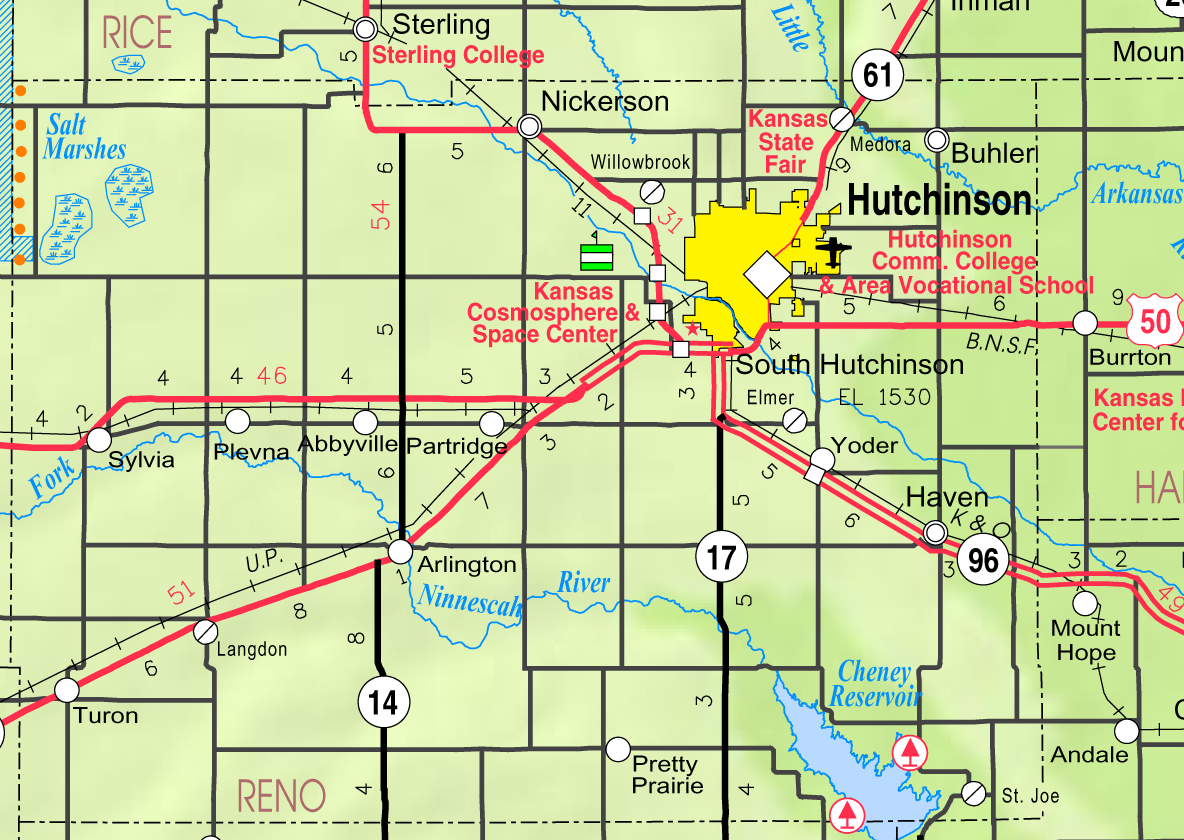
- KDOT map of Reno County (legend)
- Coordinates: 37°58′01″N 98°05′32″W
- Country: United States
- State: Kansas
- County: Reno
- Founded: 1880s
- Platted: 1886
- Incorporated: 1906

Area
  - Total: 0.31 sq mi (0.80 km^{2})
  - Land: 0.31 sq mi (0.80 km^{2})
  - Water: 0 sq mi (0.00 km^{2})
- Elevation: 1,608 ft (490 m)

Population (2020)
  - Total: 209
  - Density: 680/sq mi (260/km^{2})
- Time zone: UTC-6 (CST)
  - Summer (DST): UTC-5 (CDT)
- ZIP Code: 67566
- Area code: 620
- FIPS code: 20-54700
- GNIS ID: 2396158
- Website: City website

Partridge is a city in Reno County, Kansas, United States. As of the 2020 census, the population of the city was 209.

== History ==
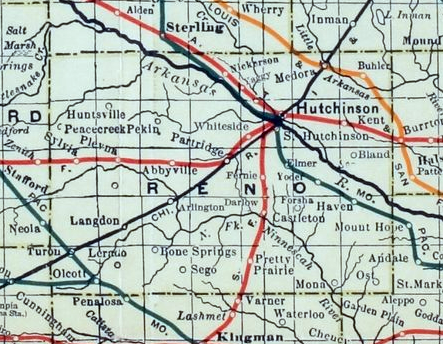
1915 railroad map of Reno County

Partridge was laid out in 1886. It was incorporated as a city in 1906. Its name commemorates the partridge.

In 1887, the Chicago, Kansas and Nebraska Railway built a main line from Herington through Partridge to Pratt. In 1888, this line was extended to Liberal. Later, it was extended to Tucumcari, New Mexico and El Paso, Texas. It was foreclosed on in 1891 and taken over by Chicago, Rock Island and Pacific Railway, which shut down in 1980; it was reorganized as Saint Louis southwestern railroad " the Cotton Belt", and merged again in 1997 with Union Pacific Railroad. Most locals still refer to this railroad as the "Rock Island."

== Geography ==
According to the United States Census Bureau, the city has a total area of 0.30 square miles (0.78 km^{2}), all land.

=== Climate ===
The climate in this area is characterized by hot, humid summers and generally mild to cool winters. According to the Köppen Climate Classification system, Partridge has a humid continental climate, abbreviated "Dfa" on climate maps.

== Demographics ==
Historical population
Census	Pop.	Note	%±
1910	246		—
1920	253		2.8%
1930	270		6.7%
1940	226		−16.3%
1950	221		−2.2%
1960	221		0.0%
1970	302		36.7%
1980	268		−11.3%
1990	213		−20.5%
2000	259		21.6%
2010	248		−4.2%
2020	209		−15.7%
U.S. Decennial Census

=== 2020 census ===
The 2020 United States census counted 209 people, 84 households, and 59 families in Partridge. The population density was 674.2 per square mile (260.3/km^{2}). There were 101 housing units at an average density of 325.8 per square mile (125.8/km^{2}). The racial makeup was 92.82% (194) white or European American (91.39% non-Hispanic white), 0.0% (0) black or African-American, 0.0% (0) Native American or Alaska Native, 0.0% (0) Asian, 0.0% (0) Pacific Islander or Native Hawaiian, 0.96% (2) from other races, and 6.22% (13) from two or more races. Hispanic or Latino of any race was 4.31% (9) of the population.

Of the 84 households, 32.1% had children under the age of 18; 53.6% were married couples living together; 20.2% had a female householder with no spouse or partner present. 23.8% of households consisted of individuals and 7.1% had someone living alone who was 65 years of age or older. The average household size was 2.4 and the average family size was 3.2. The percent of those with a bachelor's degree or higher was estimated to be 3.3% of the population.

23.4% of the population was under the age of 18, 8.6% from 18 to 24, 18.2% from 25 to 44, 32.5% from 45 to 64, and 17.2% who were 65 years of age or older. The median age was 44.5 years. For every 100 females, there were 120.0 males. For every 100 females ages 18 and older, there were 119.2 males.

The 2016–2020 5-year American Community Survey estimates show that the median household income was $44,375 (with a margin of error of +/- $19,053) and the median family income was $60,250 (+/- $22,105). Males had a median income of $40,625 (+/- $18,429) versus $24,250 (+/- $6,182) for females. The median income for those above 16 years old was $28,333 (+/- $8,253). Approximately, 6.7% of families and 9.8% of the population were below the poverty line, including 27.5% of those under the age of 18 and 0.0% of those ages 65 or over.

=== 2010 census ===
As of the census of 2010, there were 248 people, 97 households, and 67 families residing in the city. The population density was 826.7 inhabitants per square mile (319.2/km^{2}). There were 106 housing units at an average density of 353.3 per square mile (136.4/km^{2}). The racial makeup of the city was 90.7% White, 3.2% Native American, 2.0% from other races, and 4.0% from two or more races. Hispanic or Latino of any race were 5.6% of the population.

There were 97 households, of which 32.0% had children under the age of 18 living with them, 55.7% were married couples living together, 11.3% had a female householder with no husband present, 2.1% had a male householder with no wife present, and 30.9% were non-families. 27.8% of all households were made up of individuals, and 12.4% had someone living alone who was 65 years of age or older. The average household size was 2.56 and the average family size was 3.12.

The median age in the city was 42.5 years. 27% of residents were under the age of 18; 5.7% were between the ages of 18 and 24; 22.2% were from 25 to 44; 26.2% were from 45 to 64; and 19% were 65 years of age or older. The gender makeup of the city was 48.8% male and 51.2% female.

== Education ==
The community is served by Haven USD 312 public school district.

School unification consolidated Partridge High School into Haven High School. The Partridge High School mascot was Quails. The Partridge Quails won the Kansas State High School boys class B basketball championship in 1954.
