= Troy Township, Kansas =

Township in Reno County, Kansas, U.S.

Troy Township
- Township
- Location within Reno County
- Coordinates: 37.868888°N 98.082247°W
- Country: United States
- State: Kansas
- County: Reno
- Established: 1874

Government
  - District 2 County Commissioner: Ron Hirst

Area
  - Total: 36.167 sq mi (93.67 km^{2})
  - Land: 36.138 sq mi (93.60 km^{2})
  - Water: 0.029 sq mi (0.075 km^{2}) 0.08%

Population (2020)
  - Total: 148
  - Density: 4.10/sq mi (1.58/km^{2})
- Time zone: UTC-6 (CST)
  - Summer (DST): UTC-5 (CDT)
- Area code: 620
- GNIS feature ID: 473632

Troy Township is a township in Reno County, Kansas, United States. As of the 2020 census, its population was 148.

== History ==
The first township in Reno County was Reno Township, which covered the whole county upon its creation in 1872. The first settlers in what would become Troy Township was Samuel Slack and Thomas Scorsby, who settled there in April 1873. Troy Township was split off from Reno Township in 1874 and Roscoe Township was split off from Troy Township in 1879.

== Geography ==
Troy Township covers an area of 36.167 square miles (93.67 square kilometers). The North Fork Ninnescah River flows through it.

=== Adjacent townships ===
Center Township, Reno County
Westminster Township, Reno County	northwest	north	northeast	Lincoln Township, Reno County
Arlington Township, Reno County	west	self	east	Castleton Township, Reno County
Loda Township, Reno County	southwest	south
Roscoe Township, Reno County
