= South Hutchinson, Kansas =

City in Reno County, Kansas

- City
- Seal

- Location within Reno County and Kansas

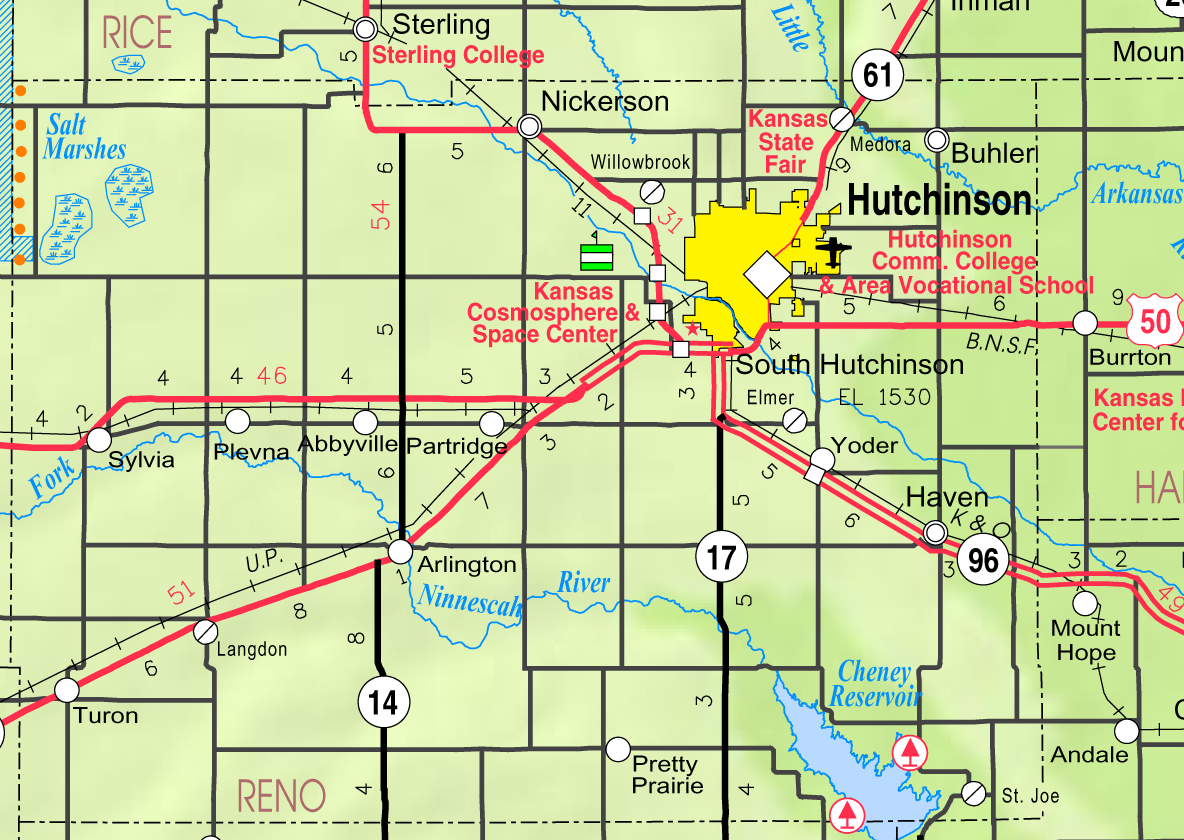
- KDOT map of Reno County (legend)
- Coordinates: 38°01′40″N 97°56′34″W
- Country: United States
- State: Kansas
- County: Reno
- Founded: 1887
- Incorporated: 1887
- Named for: South of Hutchinson

Government
  - Mayor: Dina Brislin

Area
  - Total: 2.88 sq mi (7.47 km^{2})
  - Land: 2.84 sq mi (7.36 km^{2})
  - Water: 0.042 sq mi (0.11 km^{2})
- Elevation: 1,529 ft (466 m)

Population (2020)
  - Total: 2,521
  - Density: 887/sq mi (343/km^{2})
- Time zone: UTC-6 (CST)
  - Summer (DST): UTC-5 (CDT)
- ZIP Code: 67505
- Area code: 620
- FIPS code: 20-66750
- GNIS ID: 2395917
- Website: southhutchinson.gov

South Hutchinson is a city in Reno County, Kansas, United States. As of the 2020 census, the population of the city was 2,521. It is a southern suburb of Hutchinson.

== History ==
The city was founded in 1887 by Benjamin Blanchard of Terre Haute, Indiana.

The first post office in South Hutchinson was established in August 1887.

== Geography ==
According to the United States Census Bureau, the city has a total area of 2.89 square miles (7.49 km^{2}), of which 2.87 square miles (7.43 km^{2}) is land and 0.02 square miles (0.05 km^{2}) is water.

== Demographics ==
Historical population
Census	Pop.	Note	%±
1890	321		—
1900	225		−29.9%
1910	387		72.0%
1920	639		65.1%
1930	669		4.7%
1940	915		36.8%
1950	1,045		14.2%
1960	1,672		60.0%
1970	1,879		12.4%
1980	2,226		18.5%
1990	2,444		9.8%
2000	2,539		3.9%
2010	2,457		−3.2%
2020	2,521		2.6%
U.S. Decennial Census

=== 2020 census ===
As of the 2020 census, South Hutchinson had a population of 2,521. The median age was 49.0 years. 20.0% of residents were under the age of 18 and 29.6% of residents were 65 years of age or older. For every 100 females there were 89.0 males, and for every 100 females age 18 and over there were 83.8 males age 18 and over.

96.3% of residents lived in urban areas, while 3.7% lived in rural areas.

There were 1,182 households in South Hutchinson, of which 21.8% had children under the age of 18 living in them. Of all households, 40.1% were married-couple households, 20.5% were households with a male householder and no spouse or partner present, and 33.8% were households with a female householder and no spouse or partner present. About 41.9% of all households were made up of individuals and 22.9% had someone living alone who was 65 years of age or older.

There were 1,295 housing units, of which 8.7% were vacant. The homeowner vacancy rate was 2.6% and the rental vacancy rate was 9.8%.

Racial composition as of the 2020 census
Race	Number	Percent
White	2,238	88.8%
Black or African American	54	2.1%
American Indian and Alaska Native	18	0.7%
Asian	12	0.5%
Native Hawaiian and Other Pacific Islander	3	0.1%
Some other race	47	1.9%
Two or more races	149	5.9%
Hispanic or Latino (of any race)	178	7.1%

=== 2010 census ===
As of the census of 2010, there were 2,457 people, 1,113 households, and 611 families residing in the city. The population density was 856.1 inhabitants per square mile (330.5/km^{2}). There were 1,207 housing units at an average density of 420.6 per square mile (162.4/km^{2}). The racial makeup of the city was 91.9% White, 1.1% African American, 1.0% Native American, 0.6% Asian, 0.1% Pacific Islander, 2.3% from other races, and 3.1% from two or more races. Hispanic or Latino people of any race were 6.6% of the population.

There were 1,113 households, of which 24.4% had children under the age of 18 living with them, 39.6% were married couples living together, 10.9% had a female householder with no husband present, 4.4% had a male householder with no wife present, and 45.1% were non-families. 40.3% of all households were made up of individuals, and 19% had someone living alone who was 65 years of age or older. The average household size was 2.08 and the average family size was 2.80.

The median age in the city was 47.7 years. 21.4% of residents were under the age of 18; 6.9% were between the ages of 18 and 24; 18.5% were from 25 to 44; 26.8% were from 45 to 64; and 26.5% were 65 years of age or older. The gender makeup of the city was 45.6% male and 54.4% female.

== Government ==
The South Hutchinson government consists of a mayor and five council members, which meets the second and fourth Monday of each month at 6 p.m.

== Education ==
The community is served by Nickerson–South Hutchinson USD 309 public school district.
