= Reno County, Kansas =

County in Kansas, United States

- County
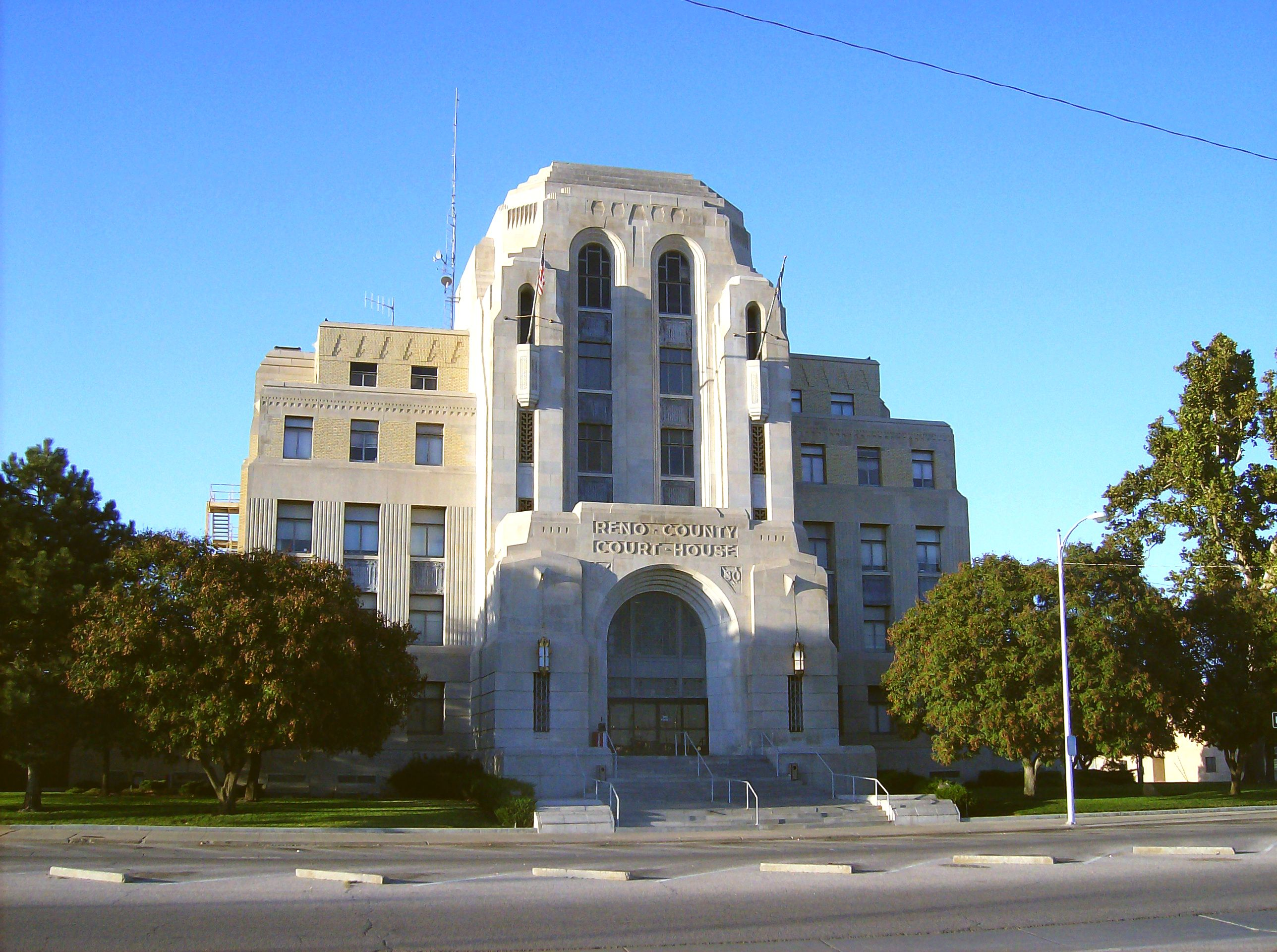
- Reno County Courthouse in Hutchinson (2008)

- Location within the U.S. state of Kansas
- Country: United States
- State: Kansas
- Founded: February 26, 1867
- Named for: Jesse Lee Reno
- Seat: Hutchinson
- Largest city: Hutchinson

Area
  - Total: 1,272 sq mi (3,290 km^{2})
  - Land: 1,255 sq mi (3,250 km^{2})
  - Water: 17 sq mi (44 km^{2}) 1.3%

Population (2020)
  - Total: 61,898
  - Estimate (2025): 61,539 ▼
  - Density: 49.3/sq mi (19.0/km^{2})
- Time zone: UTC−6 (Central)
  - Summer (DST): UTC−5 (CDT)
- Area code: 620
- Congressional district: 1st
- Website: renocountyks.gov

Reno County is a county located in the U.S. state of Kansas. Its county seat and largest city is Hutchinson. As of the 2020 census, the population was 61,898. The county is named for Jesse Reno, a general during the Civil War.

== History ==
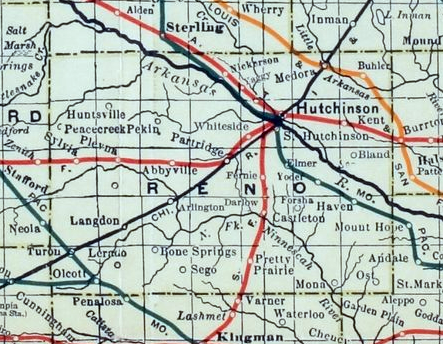
1915–1918 railroad map of Reno County

=== Early history ===
For many millennia, the Great Plains of North America were inhabited by nomadic Native Americans. From the 16th century to 18th century, the Kingdom of France claimed ownership of large parts of North America. In 1762, after the French and Indian War, France secretly ceded New France to Spain, per the Treaty of Fontainebleau.

=== 19th century ===
In 1802, Spain returned most of the land to France, but keeping title to about 7,500 square miles. In 1803, most of the land for modern day Kansas was acquired by the United States from France as part of the 828,000 square mile Louisiana Purchase for 2.83 cents per acre.

In 1854, the Kansas Territory was organized, then in 1861 Kansas became the 34th U.S. state.

In 1867, Reno County was established, named for General Jesse L. Reno.

In 1887, the Chicago, Kansas and Nebraska Railway extended its main line from Herington to Pratt. This main line connected Herington, Ramona, Tampa, Durham, Waldeck, Canton, Galva, McPherson, Groveland, Inman, Medora, Hutchinson, Whiteside, Partridge, Arlington, Langdon, Turon, Preston, Natrona and Pratt. In 1888, this main line was extended to Liberal. Later, this line was extended to Tucumcari, New Mexico and El Paso, Texas. This line is called the "Golden State Limited".

== Geography ==
According to the United States Census Bureau, the county has a total area of 1,272 square miles (3,290 km^{2}), of which 1,255 square miles (3,250 km^{2}) is land and 17 square miles (44 km^{2}) (1.3%) is water. It is the third-largest county by area in Kansas.

=== Adjacent counties ===
- Rice County (north)
- McPherson County (northeast)
- Harvey County (east)
- Sedgwick County (southeast)
- Kingman County (south)
- Pratt County (southwest)
- Stafford County (west)

=== National protected area ===
- Quivira National Wildlife Refuge (part)

== Demographics ==
Historical population
| Census | Pop. | Note | %± |
|---|---|---|---|
| 1880 | 12,826 | | — |
| 1890 | 27,079 | | 111.1% |
| 1900 | 29,027 | | 7.2% |
| 1910 | 37,853 | | 30.4% |
| 1920 | 44,423 | | 17.4% |
| 1930 | 47,785 | | 7.6% |
| 1940 | 52,165 | | 9.2% |
| 1950 | 54,058 | | 3.6% |
| 1960 | 59,055 | | 9.2% |
| 1970 | 60,765 | | 2.9% |
| 1980 | 64,983 | | 6.9% |
| 1990 | 62,389 | | −4.0% |
| 2000 | 64,790 | | 3.8% |
| 2010 | 64,511 | | −0.4% |
| 2020 | 61,898 | | −4.1% |
| 2025 (est.) | 61,539 | ▼ | −0.6% |
U.S. Decennial Census; 1790-1960 1900-1990; 1990-2000 2010-2020

The Hutchinson Micropolitan Statistical Area includes all of Reno County.

=== Racial and ethnic composition ===
Reno County, Kansas – Racial and ethnic composition Note: the US Census treats Hispanic/Latino as an ethnic category. This table excludes Latinos from the racial categories and assigns them to a separate category. Hispanics/Latinos may be of any race.
| Race / Ethnicity (NH = Non-Hispanic) | Pop 1980 | Pop 1990 | Pop 2000 | Pop 2010 | Pop 2020 | % 1980 | % 1990 | % 2000 | % 2010 | % 2020 |
|---|---|---|---|---|---|---|---|---|---|---|
| White alone (NH) | 60,843 | 57,643 | 57,797 | 55,543 | 50,316 | 93.63% | 92.39% | 89.21% | 86.10% | 81.29% |
| Black or African American alone (NH) | 1,441 | 1,677 | 1,812 | 1,843 | 1,744 | 2.22% | 2.69% | 2.80% | 2.86% | 2.82% |
| Native American or Alaska Native alone (NH) | 276 | 336 | 339 | 374 | 397 | 0.42% | 0.54% | 0.52% | 0.58% | 0.64% |
| Asian alone (NH) | 141 | 197 | 286 | 296 | 333 | 0.22% | 0.32% | 0.44% | 0.46% | 0.54% |
| Native Hawaiian or Pacific Islander alone (NH) | x | x | 18 | 18 | 41 | x | x | 0.03% | 0.03% | 0.07% |
| Other race alone (NH) | 105 | 58 | 43 | 35 | 173 | 0.16% | 0.09% | 0.07% | 0.05% | 0.28% |
| Mixed race or Multiracial (NH) | x | x | 834 | 1,193 | 2,798 | x | x | 1.29% | 1.85% | 4.52% |
| Hispanic or Latino (any race) | 2,177 | 2,478 | 3,661 | 5,209 | 6,096 | 3.35% | 3.97% | 5.65% | 8.07% | 9.85% |
| Total | 64,983 | 62,389 | 64,790 | 64,511 | 61,898 | 100.00% | 100.00% | 100.00% | 100.00% | 100.00% |

=== 2020 census ===
As of the 2020 census, the county had a population of 61,898. The median age was 41.0 years. 22.2% of residents were under the age of 18 and 20.5% of residents were 65 years of age or older. For every 100 females there were 102.1 males, and for every 100 females age 18 and over there were 101.6 males age 18 and over.

The racial makeup of the county was 85.2% White, 3.0% Black or African American, 0.8% American Indian and Alaska Native, 0.6% Asian, 0.1% Native Hawaiian and Pacific Islander, 2.9% from some other race, and 7.4% from two or more races. Hispanic or Latino residents of any race comprised 9.8% of the population.

68.6% of residents lived in urban areas, while 31.4% lived in rural areas.

There were 25,189 households in the county, of which 27.2% had children under the age of 18 living with them and 26.4% had a female householder with no spouse or partner present. About 31.7% of all households were made up of individuals and 14.5% had someone living alone who was 65 years of age or older.

There were 28,289 housing units, of which 11.0% were vacant. Among occupied housing units, 68.0% were owner-occupied and 32.0% were renter-occupied. The homeowner vacancy rate was 2.5% and the rental vacancy rate was 11.3%.

=== 2000 census ===
As of the census of 2000, there were 64,790 people, 25,498 households, and 17,313 families residing in the county. The population density was 52 people per square mile (20 people/km^{2}). There were 27,625 housing units at an average density of 22 per square mile (8.5/km^{2}). The racial makeup of the county was 91.56% White, 2.88% Black or African American, 0.58% Native American, 0.45% Asian, 0.04% Pacific Islander, 2.69% from other races, and 1.81% from two or more races. 5.65% of the population were Hispanic or Latino of any race.

There were 25,498 households, out of which 30.30% had children under the age of 18 living with them, 55.90% were married couples living together, 8.70% had a female householder with no husband present, and 32.10% were non-families. 27.90% of all households were made up of individuals, and 12.10% had someone living alone who was 65 years of age or older. The average household size was 2.41 and the average family size was 2.94.

In the county, the population was spread out, with 24.50% under the age of 18, 9.30% from 18 to 24, 26.90% from 25 to 44, 22.90% from 45 to 64, and 16.40% who were 65 years of age or older. The median age was 38 years. For every 100 females there were 100.90 males. For every 100 females age 18 and over, there were 99.00 males.

The median income for a household in the county was $35,510, and the median income for a family was $42,643. Males had a median income of $31,495 versus $21,329 for females. The per capita income for the county was $18,520. About 8.10% of families and 10.90% of the population were below the poverty line, including 13.90% of those under age 18 and 8.50% of those age 65 or over.

== Government ==
Reno County is strongly Republican. The last time a Democratic candidate won the county was in 1976 when Jimmy Carter did so. However, 1988 was somewhat close as Michael Dukakis lost the county by only 5 percentage points due to a persistent drought and farm crisis.

=== Presidential elections ===
Presidential election results

United States presidential election results for Reno County, Kansas
| Year | Republican | | Democratic | | Third party(ies) | |
| Year | No. | % | No. | % | No. | % |
|---|---|---|---|---|---|---|
| 1888 | 3,398 | 56.61% | 1,841 | 30.67% | 763 | 12.71% |
| 1892 | 3,166 | 50.00% | 0 | 0.00% | 3,166 | 50.00% |
| 1896 | 3,373 | 51.96% | 3,051 | 47.00% | 67 | 1.03% |
| 1900 | 3,769 | 56.02% | 2,859 | 42.49% | 100 | 1.49% |
| 1904 | 4,245 | 69.33% | 1,423 | 23.24% | 455 | 7.43% |
| 1908 | 4,092 | 52.72% | 3,381 | 43.56% | 289 | 3.72% |
| 1912 | 1,668 | 20.92% | 3,360 | 42.13% | 2,947 | 36.95% |
| 1916 | 6,870 | 46.05% | 6,683 | 44.80% | 1,366 | 9.16% |
| 1920 | 9,649 | 67.12% | 4,385 | 30.50% | 341 | 2.37% |
| 1924 | 10,339 | 65.23% | 3,675 | 23.18% | 1,837 | 11.59% |
| 1928 | 12,872 | 76.31% | 3,843 | 22.78% | 153 | 0.91% |
| 1932 | 8,972 | 47.30% | 9,351 | 49.29% | 647 | 3.41% |
| 1936 | 8,607 | 37.59% | 14,203 | 62.03% | 88 | 0.38% |
| 1940 | 12,448 | 53.64% | 10,543 | 45.43% | 217 | 0.94% |
| 1944 | 11,004 | 58.71% | 7,604 | 40.57% | 135 | 0.72% |
| 1948 | 11,187 | 51.87% | 9,957 | 46.17% | 423 | 1.96% |
| 1952 | 15,762 | 68.58% | 6,555 | 28.52% | 666 | 2.90% |
| 1956 | 15,057 | 66.56% | 7,461 | 32.98% | 102 | 0.45% |
| 1960 | 14,655 | 60.21% | 9,557 | 39.27% | 127 | 0.52% |
| 1964 | 8,829 | 36.83% | 14,936 | 62.30% | 208 | 0.87% |
| 1968 | 11,804 | 50.29% | 9,872 | 42.06% | 1,798 | 7.66% |
| 1972 | 15,714 | 63.81% | 8,183 | 33.23% | 731 | 2.97% |
| 1976 | 11,212 | 42.29% | 14,620 | 55.14% | 680 | 2.56% |
| 1980 | 13,804 | 52.85% | 9,615 | 36.81% | 2,702 | 10.34% |
| 1984 | 16,568 | 63.34% | 9,229 | 35.28% | 362 | 1.38% |
| 1988 | 12,753 | 51.11% | 11,545 | 46.27% | 656 | 2.63% |
| 1992 | 11,377 | 40.10% | 9,257 | 32.63% | 7,738 | 27.27% |
| 1996 | 14,275 | 54.28% | 9,108 | 34.63% | 2,917 | 11.09% |
| 2000 | 15,179 | 59.69% | 9,025 | 35.49% | 1,226 | 4.82% |
| 2004 | 17,748 | 64.95% | 9,114 | 33.36% | 462 | 1.69% |
| 2008 | 16,112 | 60.57% | 9,916 | 37.28% | 574 | 2.16% |
| 2012 | 15,718 | 64.36% | 8,085 | 33.11% | 619 | 2.53% |
| 2016 | 15,513 | 64.08% | 6,837 | 28.24% | 1,860 | 7.68% |
| 2020 | 18,443 | 65.73% | 8,886 | 31.67% | 731 | 2.61% |
| 2024 | 17,847 | 66.25% | 8,554 | 31.75% | 539 | 2.00% |

=== Laws ===
Reno County was a prohibition, or "dry", county until the Kansas Constitution was amended in 1986 and voters approved the sale of alcoholic liquor by the individual drink with a 30 percent food sales requirement. The food sales requirement was removed with voter approval in 2004.

== Education ==
=== Colleges ===
- Hutchinson Community College

=== Unified school districts ===
- Hutchinson USD 308
- Nickerson-South Hutchinson USD 309
- Fairfield USD 310
- Pretty Prairie USD 311
- Haven USD 312
- Buhler USD 313

=== Private schools ===
There are three private schools in Hutchinson:

- Central Christian School (K-12)
- Trinity Catholic High School (7-12)
- Holy Cross Catholic school (PreK-6)

== Communities ==
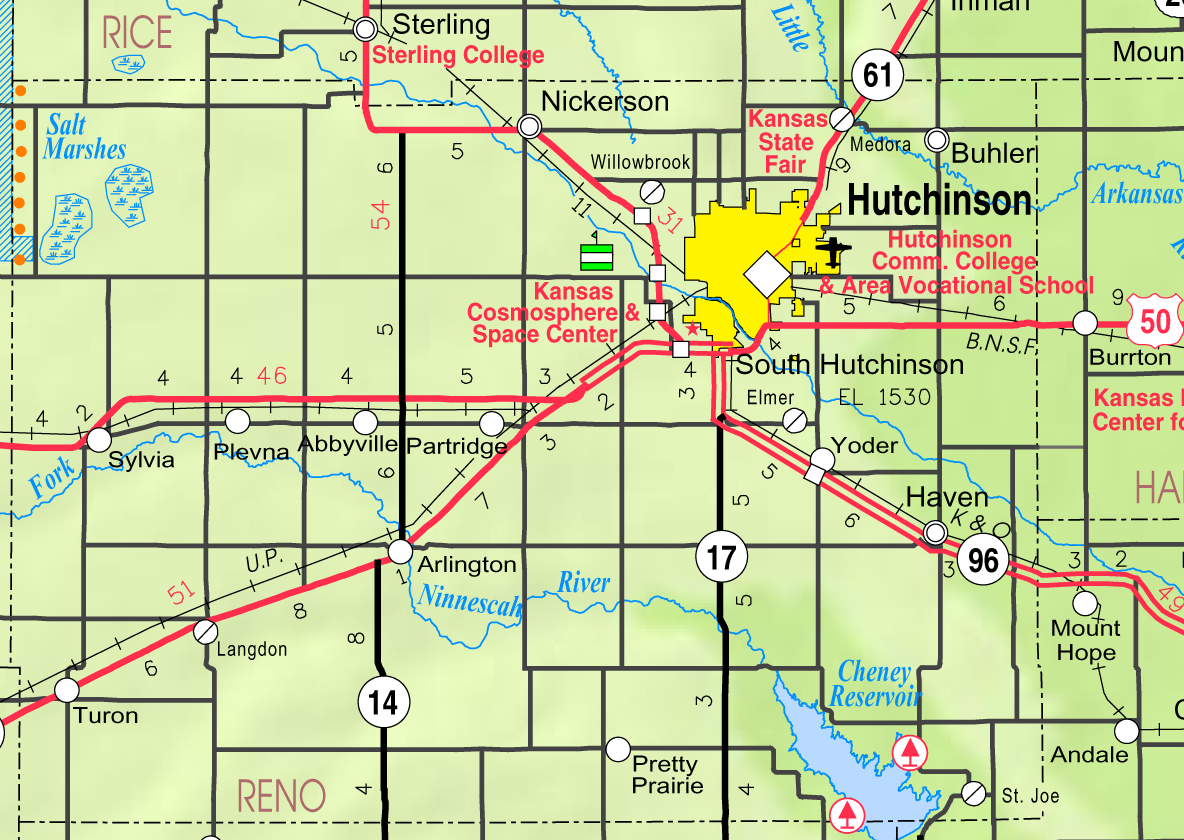
2005 map of Reno County (map legend)

List of townships / incorporated cities / unincorporated communities / extinct former communities within Reno County.

=== Cities ===
- Abbyville
- Arlington
- Buhler
- Haven
- Hutchinson (county seat)
- Langdon
- Nickerson
- Partridge
- Plevna
- Pretty Prairie
- South Hutchinson
- Sylvia
- The Highlands
- Turon
- Willowbrook

=== Unincorporated communities ===
† means a community is designated a Census-Designated Place (CDP) by the United States Census Bureau.

- Castleton
- Darlow
- Huntsville
- Lerado
- Medora
- St. Joe (Ost)
- Yaggy
- Yoder†

=== Ghost towns ===
- Kent
- Adam's Corner

=== Townships ===
Reno County is divided into thirty-one townships. The cities of Hutchinson and Nickerson are considered governmentally independent and are excluded from the census figures for the townships. In the following table, the population center is the largest city (or cities) included in that township's population total, if it is of a significant size.

Sources: 2000 U.S. Gazetteer from the U.S. Census Bureau.
| Township | FIPS | Population center | Population | Population density /km^{2} (/sq mi) | Land area km^{2} (sq mi) | Water area km^{2} (sq mi) | Water % | Geographic coordinates |
|---|---|---|---|---|---|---|---|---|
| Albion | 00875 | Pretty Prairie | 837 | 9 (22) | 97 (38) | 0 (0) | 0.02% | 37°47′5″N 98°0′2″W |
| Arlington | 02350 | Arlington | 621 | 7 (17) | 94 (36) | 0 (0) | 0.03% | 37°53′16″N 98°11′1″W |
| Bell | 05350 | | 87 | 1 (2) | 98 (38) | 0 (0) | 0.11% | 37°46′8″N 98°17′30″W |
| Castleton | 11000 | | 256 | 2 (5) | 140 (54) | 0 (0) | 0.01% | 37°51′44″N 97°57′6″W |
| Center | 12050 | Partridge | 672 | 7 (19) | 94 (36) | 0 (0) | 0.17% | 37°57′38″N 98°5′23″W |
| Clay | 13600 | | 3,302 | 38 (98) | 88 (34) | 1 (0) | 0.58% | 38°3′52″N 97°52′11″W |
| Enterprise | 21475 | | 139 | 1 (4) | 93 (36) | 0 (0) | 0.06% | 38°3′0″N 98°11′34″W |
| Grant | 28025 | | 1,307 | 11 (30) | 114 (44) | 1 (1) | 1.25% | 38°8′4″N 98°0′27″W |
| Grove | 29025 | | 64 | 1 (2) | 93 (36) | 0 (0) | 0.06% | 37°51′47″N 98°24′58″W |
| Haven | 30750 | Haven | 1,592 | 11 (29) | 143 (55) | 1 (0) | 0.41% | 37°53′56″N 97°46′46″W |
| Hayes | 31000 | | 106 | 1 (1) | 186 (72) | 0 (0) | 0.06% | 38°3′50″N 98°25′38″W |
| Huntsville | 33550 | | 118 | 1 (3) | 93 (36) | 0 (0) | 0.11% | 38°3′0″N 98°17′54″W |
| Langdon | 38525 | Langdon | 160 | 2 (4) | 94 (36) | 0 (0) | 0.16% | 37°51′40″N 98°18′57″W |
| Lincoln | 41050 | | 703 | 8 (20) | 93 (36) | 0 (0) | 0.07% | 37°57′46″N 97°58′7″W |
| Little River | 41550 | Buhler | 1,881 | 20 (52) | 93 (36) | 1 (0) | 0.57% | 38°8′15″N 97°45′44″W |
| Loda | 41700 | | 119 | 1 (3) | 98 (38) | 0 (0) | 0.27% | 37°47′2″N 98°12′22″W |
| Medford | 45450 | | 144 | 2 (5) | 83 (32) | 0 (0) | 0.18% | 38°8′14″N 98°12′24″W |
| Medora | 45600 | | 1,594 | 21 (53) | 77 (30) | 0 (0) | 0% | 38°8′40″N 97°51′3″W |
| Miami | 46125 | Turon | 521 | 5 (14) | 98 (38) | 0 (0) | 0.15% | 37°47′33″N 98°25′3″W |
| Ninnescah | 50700 | | 226 | 3 (7) | 79 (31) | 27 (10) | 25.53% | 37°47′9″N 97°51′27″W |
| Plevna | 56750 | Plevna | 235 | 3 (6) | 94 (36) | 0 (0) | 0.04% | 37°58′1″N 98°18′36″W |
| Reno | 58975 | South Hutchinson | 4,496 | 50 (129) | 90 (35) | 2 (1) | 1.65% | 38°2′31″N 97°57′27″W |
| Roscoe | 61150 | | 108 | 1 (3) | 98 (38) | 0 (0) | 0% | 37°46′11″N 98°4′23″W |
| Salt Creek | 62850 | | 483 | 3 (9) | 139 (54) | 1 (0) | 0.39% | 38°3′48″N 98°5′57″W |
| Sumner | 69200 | | 547 | 5 (13) | 106 (41) | 7 (3) | 6.13% | 37°46′24″N 97°45′51″W |
| Sylvia | 69825 | Sylvia | 393 | 4 (11) | 93 (36) | 0 (0) | 0.34% | 37°57′24″N 98°24′46″W |
| Troy | 71600 | | 112 | 1 (3) | 94 (36) | 0 (0) | 0.16% | 37°51′56″N 98°5′25″W |
| Valley | 73075 | | 887 | 6 (16) | 143 (55) | 1 (0) | 0.90% | 38°0′33″N 97°45′2″W |
| Walnut | 75100 | | 114 | 1 (3) | 94 (36) | 0 (0) | 0% | 38°7′40″N 98°18′7″W |
| Westminster | 77175 | Abbyville | 243 | 3 (7) | 94 (36) | 0 (0) | 0% | 37°57′48″N 98°12′23″W |
| Yoder | 80775 | | 742 | 8 (20) | 96 (37) | 1 (0) | 1.03% | 37°56′54″N 97°52′34″W |

== See also ==
- National Register of Historic Places listings in Reno County, Kansas
- Reno County Area Transit, known as Rcat, provides public transportation for the citizens of the county.

Community information for Kansas

- Kansas locations by per capita income
- List of counties in Kansas
- List of townships in Kansas
- List of cities in Kansas
- List of unincorporated communities in Kansas
- List of ghost towns in Kansas
