= Reno Township, Reno County, Kansas =

Township in Reno County, Kansas, U.S.

Reno Township
- Township
- Location within Reno County
- Coordinates: 38.053304°N 97.974999°W
- Country: United States
- State: Kansas
- County: Reno
- Established: 1872

Government
  - Districts 1 and 2 County Commissioners: Randy Parks and Ron Hirst

Area
  - Total: 35.801 sq mi (92.72 km^{2})
  - Land: 35.218 sq mi (91.21 km^{2})
  - Water: 0.583 sq mi (1.51 km^{2}) 1.63%

Population (2020)
  - Total: 4,331
  - Density: 123.0/sq mi (47.48/km^{2})
- Time zone: UTC-6 (CST)
  - Summer (DST): UTC-5 (CDT)
- Area code: 316 and 620
- GNIS feature ID: 473646

Reno Township is a township in Reno County, Kansas, United States. As of the 2020 census, its population was 4,331.

== History ==
Reno Township was the first township to be created in Reno County, being organized in 1872, and consisted of the entire county. Later in 1872, Castleton Township, Clay Township, Grant Township, Haven Township, Little River Township, and Valley Township were separated from Reno Township. 1873 would see Center Township and Lincoln Township being separated while 1874 would see Langdon Township, Medford Township, Salt Creek Township, and Troy Township being separated from Reno Township.

== Geography ==
Reno Township covers an area of 35.801 square miles (92.72 square kilometers). The Arkansas River flows through it.

=== Communities ===
- South Hutchinson

=== Adjacent townships ===
Grant Township, Reno County
		north	northeast	Medora Township, Reno County
Salt Creek Township, Reno County	west	self	east	Clay Township, Reno County
Center Township, Reno County	southwest	south	southeast	Yoder Township, Reno County
Lincoln Township, Reno County

== Transportation ==
=== Major highways ===
- US-50
- K-14
- K-61
- K-96
