= Tornado outbreak of April 21–23, 1883 =

Weather event in the United States

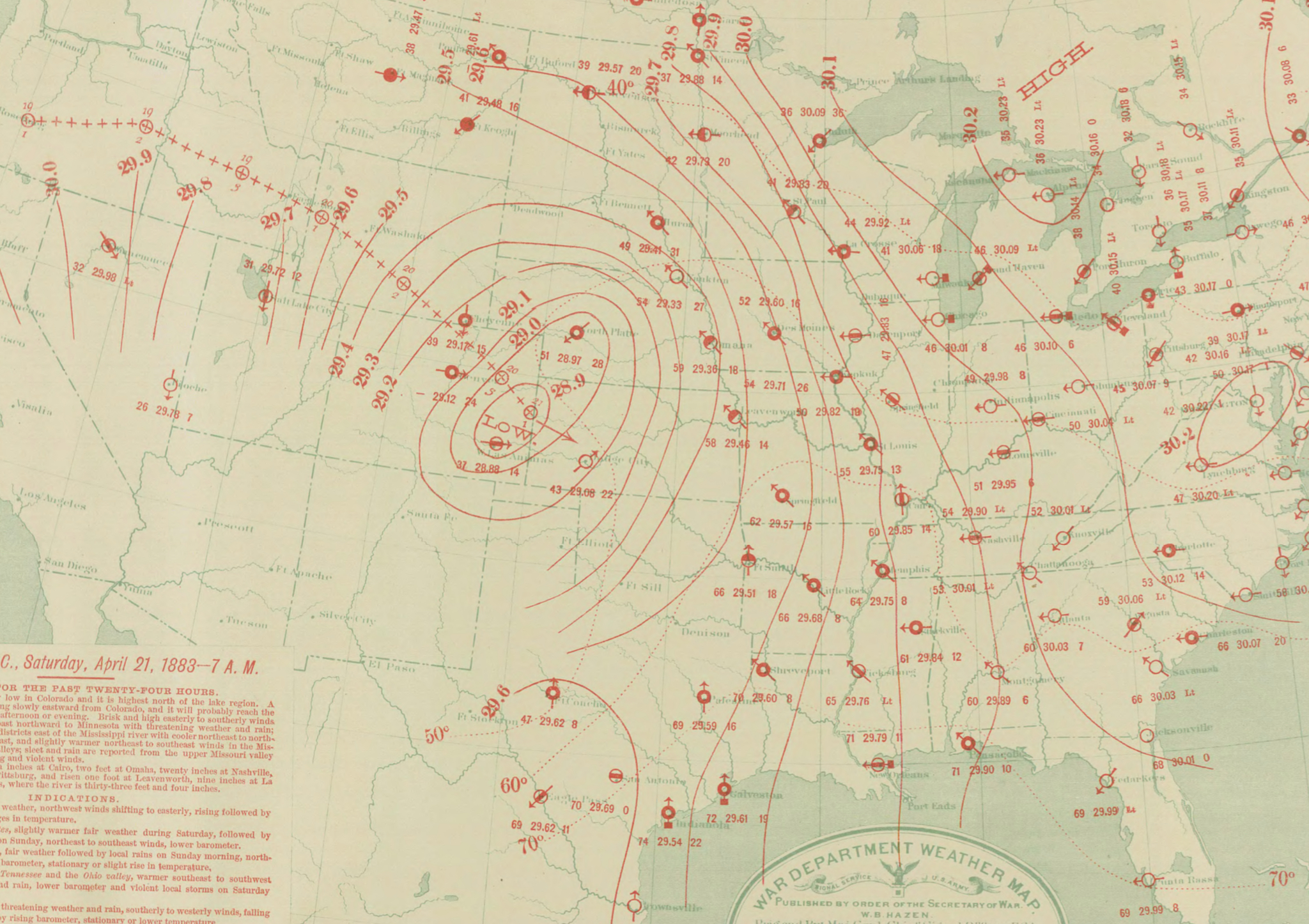
- Weather map of the storm system over the central U.S that would be responsible for the tornado outbreak on April 21, 1883.

Tornado outbreak
- Tornadoes: ≥ 29
- Max. rating: F4 tornado
- Duration: April 21–23, 1883

Overall effects
- Fatalities: ≥ 122
- Injuries: > 771
- Damage: > $1,478,000 ($51,070,000 in 2025 USD) (Note: All losses are in 1883 United States dollars unless otherwise noted.)
- Areas affected: Central and Southern United States
- Part of the tornadoes and tornado outbreaks of 1883

On April 21–23, 1883, a tornado outbreak affected portions of the south-central United States, killing at least 122 people and injuring over 771. It produced at least 29 tornadoes, including long-lived events, the deadliest of which, retroactively rated F4, killed at least 56 people in and near Georgetown, Mississippi. A similarly intense tornado, likely at least F3, killed 11 people in the same area, and a pair of F4s in Georgia collectively claimed 18 lives as well. Another F3 killed seven people near Starkville, Mississippi, and an F3 also killed four or more people along the Louisiana–Mississippi border. An F2 near French Camp, Mississippi, killed five more as well. Many more tornadoes than listed likely occurred but, lacking sufficient documentation, could not be verified. (Note: An outbreak is generally defined as a group of at least six tornadoes (the number sometimes varies slightly according to local climatology) with no more than a six-hour gap between individual tornadoes. An outbreak sequence, prior to (after) the start of modern records in 1950, is defined as a period of no more than two (one) consecutive days without at least one significant (F2 or stronger) tornado.)

== Confirmed tornadoes ==
Confirmed tornadoes by Fujita rating
FU	F0	F1	F2	F3	F4	F5	Total
9	?	?	11	5	4	0	≥ 29

The following events were reported as well:

- Up to 10 unconfirmed tornadoes may have hit Mississippi.
- A tornado may have hit Ashville, Alabama, wrecking homes there.
- A pair of tornadoes may have hit the Mobile area.
- A tornado may have injured many people and destroyed five homes in Barbour County.

Prior to 1990, there is a likely undercount of tornadoes, particularly E/F0–1, with reports of weaker tornadoes becoming more common as population increased. A sharp increase in the annual average E/F0–1 count by approximately 200 tornadoes was noted upon the implementation of NEXRAD Doppler weather radar in 1990–1991. (Note: Historically, the number of tornadoes globally and in the United States was and is likely underrepresented: research by Grazulis on annual tornado activity suggests that, as of 2001, only 53% of yearly U.S. tornadoes were officially recorded. Documentation of tornadoes outside the United States was historically less exhaustive, owing to the lack of monitors in many nations and, in some cases, to internal political controls on public information. Most countries only recorded tornadoes that produced severe damage or loss of life. Significant low biases in U.S. tornado counts likely occurred through the early 1990s, when advanced NEXRAD was first installed and the National Weather Service began comprehensively verifying tornado occurrences.) 1974 marked the first year where significant tornado (E/F2+) counts became homogenous with contemporary values, attributed to the consistent implementation of Fujita scale assessments. (Note: The Fujita scale was devised under the aegis of scientist T. Theodore Fujita in the early 1970s. Prior to the advent of the scale in 1971, tornadoes in the United States were officially unrated. Tornado ratings were retroactively applied to events prior to the formal adoption of the F-scale by the National Weather Service. While the Fujita scale has been superseded by the Enhanced Fujita scale in the U.S. since February 1, 2007, Canada used the old scale until April 1, 2013; nations elsewhere, like the United Kingdom, apply other classifications such as the TORRO scale.) Numerous discrepancies on the details of tornadoes in this outbreak exist between sources. The total count of tornadoes and ratings differs from various agencies accordingly. The list below documents information from the most contemporary official sources alongside assessments from tornado historian Thomas P. Grazulis.

=== April 21 event ===
List of confirmed tornadoes – Saturday, April 21, 1883
F#	Location	County / Parish	State	Time (UTC) (Note: All dates are based on the local time zone where the tornado touched down; however, all times are in Coordinated Universal Time and dates are split at midnight CST/CDT for consistency.)	Path length	Width (Note: The listed width values are primarily the average/mean width of the tornadoes, with those having known maximum widths denoted by ♯. From 1952 to 1994, reports largely list mean width whereas contemporary years list maximum width. Values provided by Grazulis are the average width, with estimates being rounded down (i.e. 0.5 mi (0.80 km) is rounded down from 880 yards to 800 yards.)	Damage (Note: The National Oceanic and Atmospheric Administration's Storm Data publication does not list exact damage totals for every event, instead giving damage categories. As such, damage for individual tornadoes is not comprehensive.)
FU	Northeastern Belmont Township to Waterloo	Kingman	KS	06:00–?	Unknown	Unknown	$3,000
FU	A tornado crossed Kingman County, "demolishing everything in its path", according to the Monthly Weather Review. It destroyed homes and scattered household items, leaving only a few houses intact at Waterloo. In all it damaged or destroyed 16 buildings.						
F3	Sun City to Turkey Creek	Barber	KS	08:00–?	5 mi (8.0 km)	Unknown	$5,000
F3	3 deaths – Related to the previous event, a tornado destroyed five homes, causing deaths in one of them. It also unroofed a few stores and half a dozen homes, injuring five people. Bodies were moved 300 yd (270 m).						
F2	E of Mapleton to near Correctionville to Danbury	Monona, Woodbury	IA	00:30–?	7 mi (11 km)	Unknown	Unknown
F2	A strong, swift tornado injured half a dozen people at suppertime, while wrecking small buildings, a church, and three houses. It also severely damaged and tossed a building 8 rd (130 ft; 40 m).						
F4	N of Woodbine to W of Dunlap	Harrison, Crawford	IA	02:00–?	10 mi (16 km)	150 yd (140 m)	Unknown
F4	2 deaths – A violent tornado leveled a farmhouse and tore apart many others. It also uprooted trees, killed livestock, and "completely carried away" small buildings, the Monthly Weather Review stated. 10 injuries occurred.						

=== April 22 event ===
List of confirmed tornadoes – Sunday, April 21, 1883
F#	Location	County / Parish	State	Time (UTC)	Path length	Width	Damage
F3	Near Deer Park (LA) to E of Red Lick (MS) to Tillman (MS)	Concordia (LA), Adams (MS), Jefferson (MS), Claiborne (MS)	LA, MS	15:40–?	55 mi (89 km)	200 yd (180 m)	Unknown
F3	4+ deaths – An intense tornado family wrecked at least 15 homes in Mississippi, unroofed others in Louisiana, and injured 30 people, passing southeast of Natchez, Mississippi.						
FU	E of Monticello	Lawrence	MS	17:00–?	Unknown	200 yd (180 m)	Unknown
FU	1+ death – A tornado caused severe damage.						
F3	N of Midland to near Christiana to S of Dillton	Rutherford	TN	18:00–?	10 mi (16 km)	200 yd (180 m)	Unknown
F3	1 death – A tornado tracked across southern Rutherford County, where it obliterated a home, unroofed others, downed fences, and "mowed down" trees "as if by an immense scythe", according to reports Grazulis excerpted. A few injuries occurred.						
FU	Unknown	Clay	MS	18:00–?	Unknown	Unknown	Unknown
FU	1+ death – A "very violent" tornado affected the western half of Clay County, downing fences, buildings, and trees, the Monthly Weather Review reported.						
F3+	N of Georgetown to Harrisville to NW of Forest	Copiah, Simpson, Rankin, Scott	MS	19:00–?	55 mi (89 km)	400 yd (370 m)	Unknown
F3+	11+ deaths – This tornado was the first of two intense, long-lived, deadly events to hit near Georgetown on April 22 and may have ended 29 or more lives. Grazulis noted that the tornado "was probably as intense" as its successor, an F4, but was unable to locate detailed information. 100 injuries occurred.						
F3	NW of Starkville to W of West Point to E of Aberdeen	Oktibbeha, Clay, Monroe	MS	19:00–?	30 mi (48 km)	500 yd (460 m)	Unknown
F3	7 deaths – A tornado tore apart 13 homes near Starkville, one of which it swept away. The tornado ravaged an African-American settlement, Freedmanstown, in southern Aberdeen, claiming five lives and destroying 12 or more homes there. In all 70 injuries occurred.						
F2	S of French Camp to Dido	Attala, Choctaw	MS	20:30–?	25 mi (40 km)	200 yd (180 m)	Unknown
F2	5 deaths – A tornado caused fatalities in a few families, while destroying homes and a store. 30 injuries occurred, several of which were critical.						
F4	Near Parrott to S of Bottsford to N of Americus	Terrell, Webster, Sumter	GA	20:30–?	25 mi (40 km)	1,320 yd (1,210 m)♯	Unknown
F4	10 deaths – A large, violent tornado flattened spacious homes, killed hundreds of livestock, and destroyed fences. It also wrecked various other buildings and injured 80 people.						
F4	SW of McCall Creek to western Wesson to Beauregard to southern Georgetown	Franklin, Lincoln, Copiah, Simpson	MS	21:00–?	45 mi (72 km)	800 yd (730 m)	>$470,000
F4	56+ deaths – A violent tornado hit plantations northwest of Brookhaven, destroying buildings there. Striking Wesson, it destroyed 27 homes—many of which it leveled—killed 13 people, and injured 60 others. According to Grazulis the tornado "virtually leveled" Beauregard; the Monthly Weather Review claimed it wrecked "every dwelling and store" there, including a few entire rows of buildings. It tossed an 675-pound (306 kg) iron screw 300 yd (270 m) from a cotton press and drove a 10-foot-long (3.0 m), 3-by-4-inch (76 by 102 mm) scantling through a red oak sapling. In Beauregard it claimed 29 lives and injured over 100 people. It then killed 14 more people on the outskirts of Georgetown, impacting many rural churches during worship, and flattened extensive timberland; its total death toll is uncertain. It and the previous Georgetown event collectively afflicted 50 mi^{2} (130 km^{2}), with up to $1 million in losses and potentially more than 100 fatalities. 300 injuries occurred.						
F2	Tubble Station to Caledonia	Lowndes	MS	22:00–?	13 mi (21 km)	300 yd (270 m)	Unknown
F2	2+ deaths – Passing north of Columbus, a tornado destroyed many plantations and downed numerous trees. Near Caledonia it blew away "every fence for miles around", the Monthly Weather Review declared. As many as eight additional deaths may have occurred. 40 people were injured.						
F2	Near Springville to Whitney	St. Clair	AL	04:30–?	11 mi (18 km)	200 yd (180 m)	Unknown
F2	1+ death – A tornado wrecked eight homes and injured 10 people, possibly causing as many as seven fatalities.						
FU	Holts Corner–College Grove area	Williamson	TN	Unknown	5 mi (8.0 km)	Unknown	Unknown
FU	A tornado unroofed outhouses, barns, and dwellings, while pushing a spacious two-story home off its foundation. It swept away a smokehouse, strewed about its 1,500 lb (680 kg) of bacon, felled trees—both wild and cultivated—and mutilated and killed livestock.						

=== April 23 event ===
List of confirmed tornadoes – Monday, April 22, 1883
F#	Location	County / Parish	State	Time (UTC)	Path length	Width	Damage
F2	Chattanooga (1st tornado)	Hamilton	TN	05:00–?	1 mi (1.6 km)	100 yd (91 m)	Unknown
F2	A pair of tornadoes swept through town, collectively doing $10,000 in damage. The strongest of the two unroofed a rail depot, three houses, and three businesses. It also wrecked a blacksmith shop.						
FU	Chattanooga (2nd tornado)	Hamilton	TN	~05:00–?	Unknown	<100 yd (91 m)	Unknown
FU	A smaller tornado accompanied and eventually merged with the main event.						
F2	W of Roanoke	Randolph	AL	05:30–?	Unknown	Unknown	Unknown
F2	1 death – A tornado destroyed two or more homes, injuring five people, some severely.						
F2	N of Crawford to near Sandy Cross	Oglethorpe	GA	05:30–?	8 mi (13 km)	100 yd (91 m)	Unknown
F2	1+ death – A tornado wrecked tenant homes and unroofed a few larger houses. More fatalities than listed may have occurred. 10 people were injured.						
FU	Eastman	Dodge	GA	~05:30–?	Unknown	Unknown	Unknown
FU	3 deaths – A tornado was reported.						
F2	Darlington	Darlington	SC	10:00–?	Unknown	Unknown	Unknown
F2	A tornado tore apart many homes and killed animals.						
F4	S of Albany to E of Isabella	Baker, Dougherty, Worth	GA	10:30–?	25 mi (40 km)	500 yd (460 m)	Unknown
F4	8 deaths – A violent tornado leveled two plantations, killing three people in a newly-built manor. All other deaths occurred elsewhere on the plantations. 50 injuries occurred.						
FU	Swainsboro	Emanuel	GA	11:00–12:00	Unknown	Unknown	Unknown
FU	2 deaths – A tornado did significant damage, injuring a number of people and leaving others homeless.						
F2	S of Woodville	Greene	GA	11:15–?	Unknown	Unknown	Unknown
F2	3 deaths – A tornado hit tenant homes, killing their occupants. It also unroofed and destroyed a few larger houses. 10 injuries occurred.						
F2	Near Boykins	Sampson	NC	12:00–?	4 mi (6.4 km)	150 yd (140 m)	Unknown
F2	A tornado littered roads with fallen trees and other objects, obstructing access. It also destroyed small houses and other buildings. Eight injuries occurred.						
F2	SE of Barnwell to SE of Blackville	Barnwell	SC	16:00–?	9 mi (14 km)	100 yd (91 m)	Unknown
F2	A tornado, described as "balloon-shaped" in an account quoted by Grazulis, felled large pine trees near the Salkehatchie swamp, striking 11 farms and destroying 12 tenant homes. It also wrecked many outbuildings and cabins, strewing many of the "best fields" with debris that hindered cultivation, while severely damaging "nearly everything" in its way, the Monthly Weather Review asserted. A 3/4-mile-wide (1.2 km) swath of downburst damage attended the tornado. In all five injuries occurred.						
FU	Stateburg	Sumter	SC	Unknown	5 mi (8.0 km)	300 yd (270 m)	Unknown
FU	A tornado virtually leveled a swath of trees.						
FU	St. Stephen	Berkeley	SC	Unknown	Unknown	Unknown	Unknown
FU	A tornado felled trees and damaged buildings.						

== Other effects ==
On April 21, hail 9 in (23 cm) in circumference fell in Harper County, Kansas. At Rome, Sumner County, hail did crop and other damage. Strong winds blew down a trio of homes at New Bedford, killing a person, and unroofed a sprawling, three-story building at Wellington. Winds also destroyed five buildings at South Haven. On April 22, storms heavily damaged Lawrence, Mississippi, and on April 23 blew down a pair of dwellings at Lexington, Georgia, along with gin houses and cabins in Taliaferro and Lincoln counties. Significant damage also afflicted Crawford and Clarke counties.

== See also ==
- Dixie Alley
- List of North American tornadoes and tornado outbreaks

== Sources ==
- Agee, Ernest M.; Childs, Samuel (June 1, 2014). "Adjustments in Tornado Counts, F-Scale Intensity, and Path Width for Assessing Significant Tornado Destruction". Journal of Applied Meteorology and Climatology. 53 (6). American Meteorological Society: 1494–1505. Bibcode:2014JApMC..53.1494A. doi:10.1175/JAMC-D-13-0235.1.
- Brooks, Harold E. (April 2004). "On the Relationship of Tornado Path Length and Width to Intensity". Weather and Forecasting. 19 (2): 310–19. Bibcode:2004WtFor..19..310B. doi:10.1175/1520-0434(2004)019<0310:OTROTP>2.0.CO;2.
- Cook, A. R.; Schaefer, J. T. (August 2008). "The Relation of El Niño–Southern Oscillation (ENSO) to Winter Tornado Outbreaks". Monthly Weather Review. 136 (8): 3121–3137. Bibcode:2008MWRv..136.3121C. doi:10.1175/2007MWR2171.1.
- Edwards, Roger; LaDue, James G.; Ferree, John T.; Scharfenberg, Kevin; Maier, Chris; Coulbourne, William L. (May 1, 2013). "Tornado Intensity Estimation: Past, Present, and Future". Bulletin of the American Meteorological Society. 94 (5). American Meteorological Society: 641–653. Bibcode:2013BAMS...94..641E. doi:10.1175/BAMS-D-11-00006.1.
- Grazulis, Thomas P. (May 1984). Violent Tornado Climatography, 1880–1982. OSTI (Technical report). NUREG. Washington, D.C.: Nuclear Regulatory Commission. OSTI 7099491. CR-3670.
  - — (November 1990). Significant Tornadoes 1880–1989. Vol. 2. St. Johnsbury, Vermont: The Tornado Project of Environmental Films. ISBN 1-879362-02-3.
  - — (July 1993). Significant Tornadoes 1680–1991: A Chronology and Analysis of Events. St. Johnsbury, Vermont: The Tornado Project of Environmental Films. ISBN 1-879362-03-1.
  - — (2001a). The Tornado: Nature's Ultimate Windstorm. Norman: University of Oklahoma Press. ISBN 978-0-8061-3538-0.
  - — (2001b). F5-F6 Tornadoes. St. Johnsbury, Vermont: The Tornado Project of Environmental Films.
- "Local storms" (PDF). Monthly Weather Review. 11 (4). Washington, D.C.: United States Army Signal Corps: 88–9. April 1883. Bibcode:1883MWRv...11R..88.. doi:10.1175/1520-0493(1883)11[88b:W]2.0.CO;2. Archived from the original (PDF) on 29 April 2017 – via American Meteorological Society.
