= Kiowa Township, Kansas (disambiguation) =

Kiowa Township, Kansas may refer to:

- Kiowa Township, Barber County, Kansas
- Kiowa Rural Township, Kiowa County, Kansas

== See also ==
- Kiowa Township (disambiguation)
