= Township 11, Pratt County, Kansas =

Township in Pratt County, Kansas, U.S.

Township 11
- Township
- Location within Pratt County
- Coordinates: 37.509065°N 98.619768°W
- Country: United States
- State: Kansas
- County: Pratt
- Established: 1970s

Government
  - County Commissioner District 3: Rick Shriver

Area
  - Total: 108.749 sq mi (281.66 km^{2})
  - Land: 108.721 sq mi (281.59 km^{2})
  - Water: 0.028 sq mi (0.073 km^{2}) 0.03%

Population (2020)
  - Total: 403
  - Density: 3.71/sq mi (1.43/km^{2})
- Time zone: UTC-6 (CST)
  - Summer (DST): UTC-5 (CDT)
- Area code: 620
- GNIS feature ID: 470386

Township 11 is a township in Pratt County, Kansas, United States. As of the 2020 census, its population was 403.

== History ==
Township 11 was originally made up of Elm, Paxon, and Gove Townships, which were merged in the 1970s to form Township 11.

== Geography ==
Township 11 covers an area of 108.749 square miles (281.66 square kilometers).

=== Communities ===
- Sawyer

=== Adjacent townships ===
Township 12, Pratt County
| Township 9, Pratt County | northwest | north | northeast | Rural Township, Kingman County |
| Township 10, Pratt County | west | self | east | Kingman Township, Kingman County |
| McAdoo Township, Barber County | southwest | south | southeast | Liberty Township, Kingman County; Valley Township, Barber County |
Elm Mills Township, Barber County

== Transportation ==
=== Major highways ===
- US-281
- K-42
