= Stubbs, Kansas =

Unincorporated community in Barber County, Kansas

- Unincorporated community
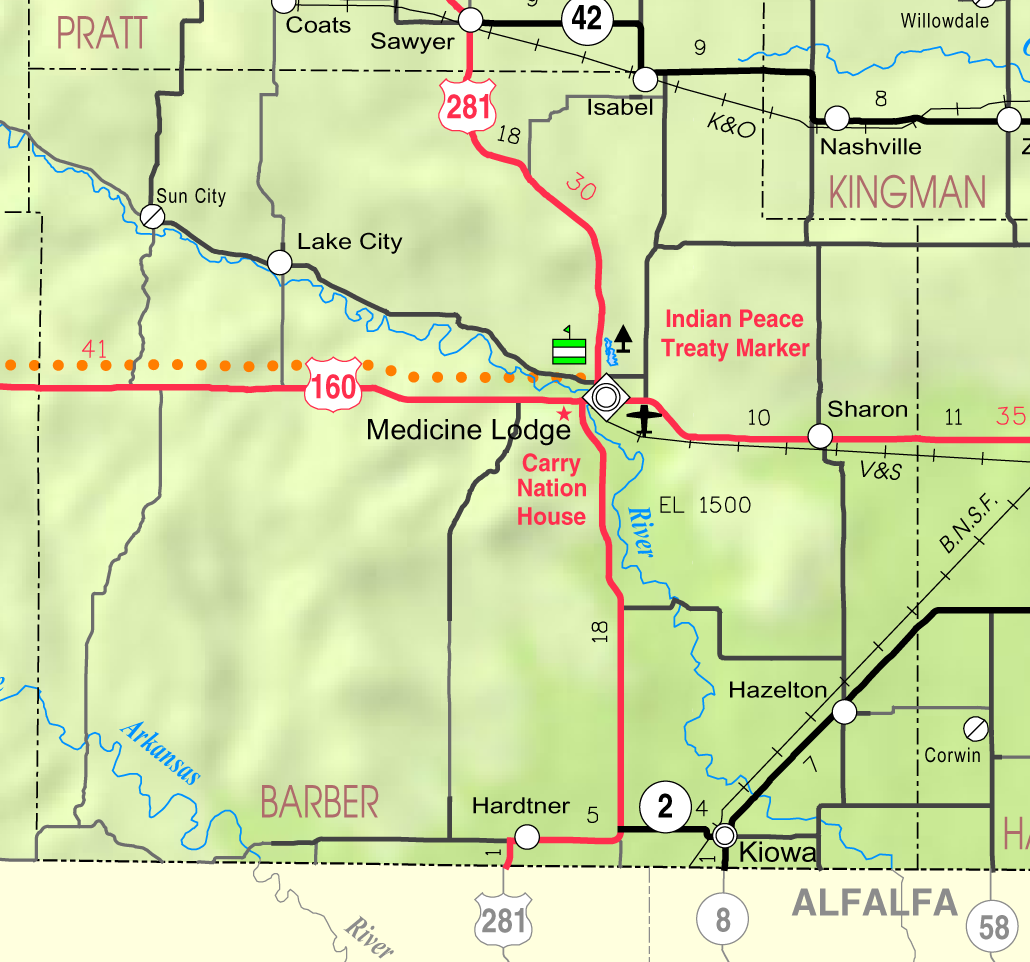
- KDOT map of Barber County (legend)

- Location within Kansas Location within the United States
- Coordinates: 37°00′24″N 98°33′57″W
- Country: United States
- State: Kansas
- County: Barber
- Township: Kiowa
- Elevation: 1,378 ft (420 m)
- Time zone: UTC-6 (CST)
  - Summer (DST): UTC-5 (CDT)
- ZIP Code: 67070
- Area code: 620
- FIPS code: 20-68675
- GNIS ID: 484526

Stubbs is an unincorporated community in Kiowa Township, Barber County, Kansas, United States. It is located 4.5 miles (7.2 km) west of Kiowa.
