= Township 10, Pratt County, Kansas =

Township in Pratt County, Kansas, U.S.

Township 10
- Township
- Location within Pratt County
- Coordinates: 37.512357°N 98.894064°W
- Country: United States
- State: Kansas
- County: Pratt
- Established: 1970s

Government
  - County Commissioner District 3: Rick Shriver

Area
  - Total: 72.428 sq mi (187.59 km^{2})
  - Land: 72.427 sq mi (187.59 km^{2})
  - Water: 0.001 sq mi (0.0026 km^{2}) 0%

Population (2020)
  - Total: 132
  - Density: 1.82/sq mi (0.704/km^{2})
- Time zone: UTC-6 (CST)
  - Summer (DST): UTC-5 (CDT)
- Area code: 620
- GNIS feature ID: 470371

Township 10 is a township in Pratt County, Kansas, United States. As of the 2020 census, its population was 132.

== History ==
Township 10 was originally made up of Springvale and Grant Townships, which were merged in the 1970s to form Township 10.

== Geography ==
Township 10 covers an area of 72.428 square miles (187.59 square kilometers).

=== Communities ===
- Coats

=== Adjacent townships ===
Township 9, Pratt County
| | | north | northeast | Township 12, Pratt County |
| Kiowa Rural Township, Kiowa County | west | self | east | Township 11, Pratt County |
| | | south | southeast | McAdoo Township, Barber County |
Turkey Creek Township, Barber County
