= Kiowa Township =

Kiowa Township may refer to:

== In Kansas ==
- Kiowa Township, Barber County, Kansas
- Kiowa Rural Township, Kiowa County, Kansas
