= Forest City, Kansas =

Unincorporated community in Barber County, Kansas

- Unincorporated community
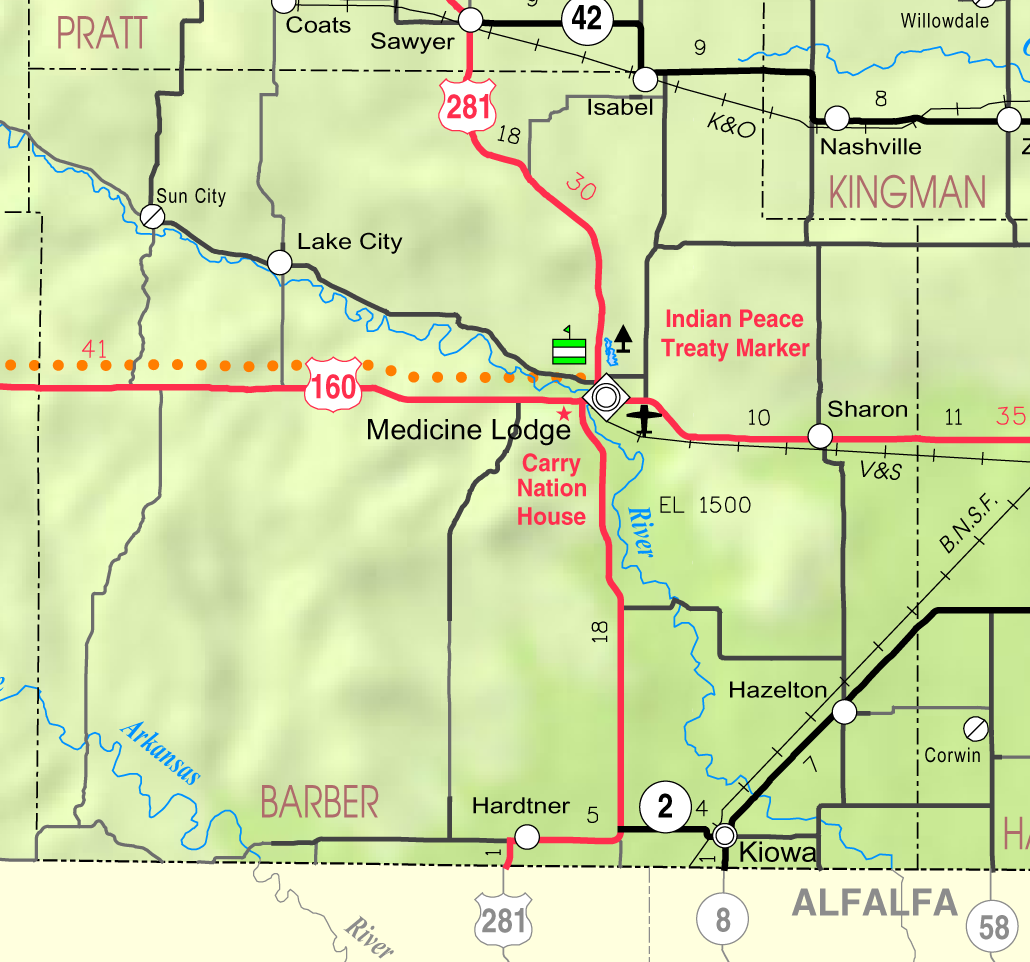
- KDOT map of Barber County (legend)

- Location within Kansas Location within the United States
- Coordinates: 37°19′21″N 98°43′50″W
- Country: United States
- State: Kansas
- County: Barber
- Township: Mingona
- Elevation: 1,578 ft (481 m)
- Time zone: UTC-6 (CST)
  - Summer (DST): UTC-5 (CDT)
- ZIP Code: 67104
- Area code: 620
- FIPS code: 20-23765
- GNIS ID: 484518

Forest City is an unincorporated community in Mingona Township, Barber County, Kansas, United States. It is located 9 miles (14 km) west-northwest of Medicine Lodge.

== History ==
A post office called Forest operated from 1908 until 1919.
