= Mingona, Kansas =

Unincorporated community in Barber County, Kansas

- Unincorporated community
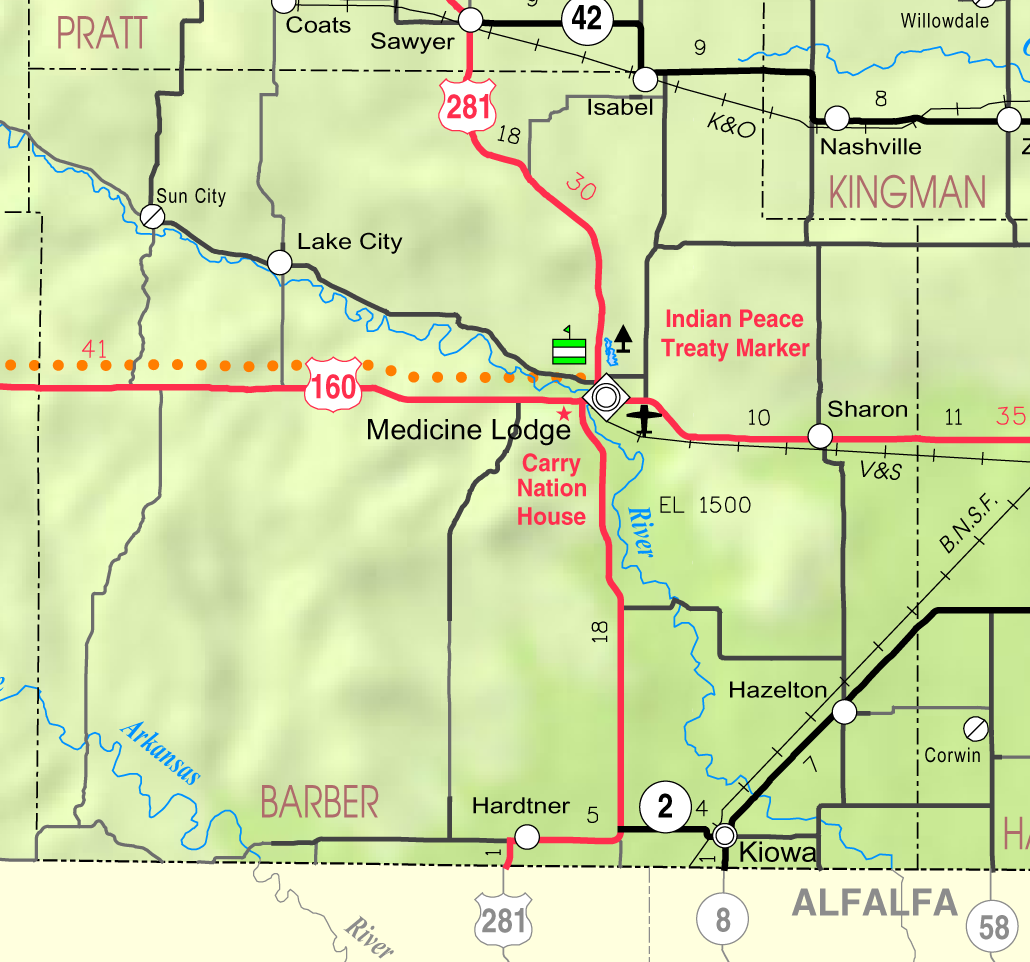
- KDOT map of Barber County (legend)

- Location within Kansas Location within the United States
- Coordinates: 37°19′26″N 98°41′25″W
- Country: United States
- State: Kansas
- County: Barber
- Township: Mingona
- Elevation: 1,578 ft (481 m)
- Time zone: UTC-6 (CST)
  - Summer (DST): UTC-5 (CDT)
- ZIP Code: 67104
- Area code: 620
- GNIS ID: 484517

Mingona is an unincorporated community in Mingona Township, Barber County, Kansas, United States. It is located 6.5 miles (10.5 km) northwest of Medicine Lodge.

== History ==
Mingona had a post office from 1885 until 1893.
