= Elm Mills, Kansas =

Unincorporated community in Barber County, Kansas

- Unincorporated community
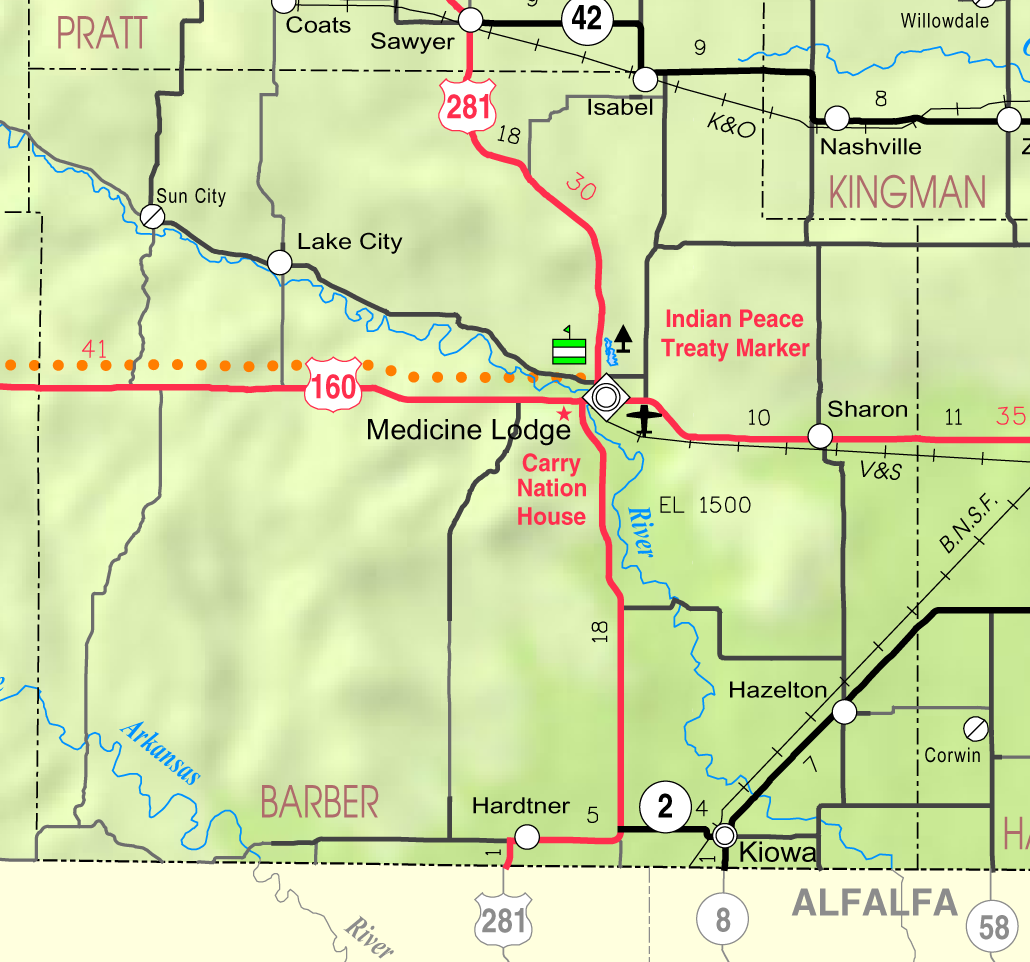
- KDOT map of Barber County (legend)

- Location within Kansas Location within the United States
- Coordinates: 37°26′02″N 98°41′13″W
- Country: United States
- State: Kansas
- County: Barber
- Township: Elm Mills
- Elevation: 1,732 ft (528 m)
- Time zone: UTC-6 (CST)
  - Summer (DST): UTC-5 (CDT)
- ZIP Code: 67134
- Area code: 620
- GNIS ID: 484516

Elm Mills is an unincorporated community in Elm Mills Township, Barber County, Kansas, United States. It is located 4.5 miles (7.2 km) south of Sawyer.

== History ==
A post office was opened in Elm Mills in 1878, and remained in operation until it was discontinued in 1893.

== Notable people ==
- S. F. Light, zoologist, entomologist, and professor at the University of California, Berkeley, known for his research on caste development in termites
