= Deerhead, Kansas =

Unincorporated community in Barber County, Kansas

- Unincorporated community
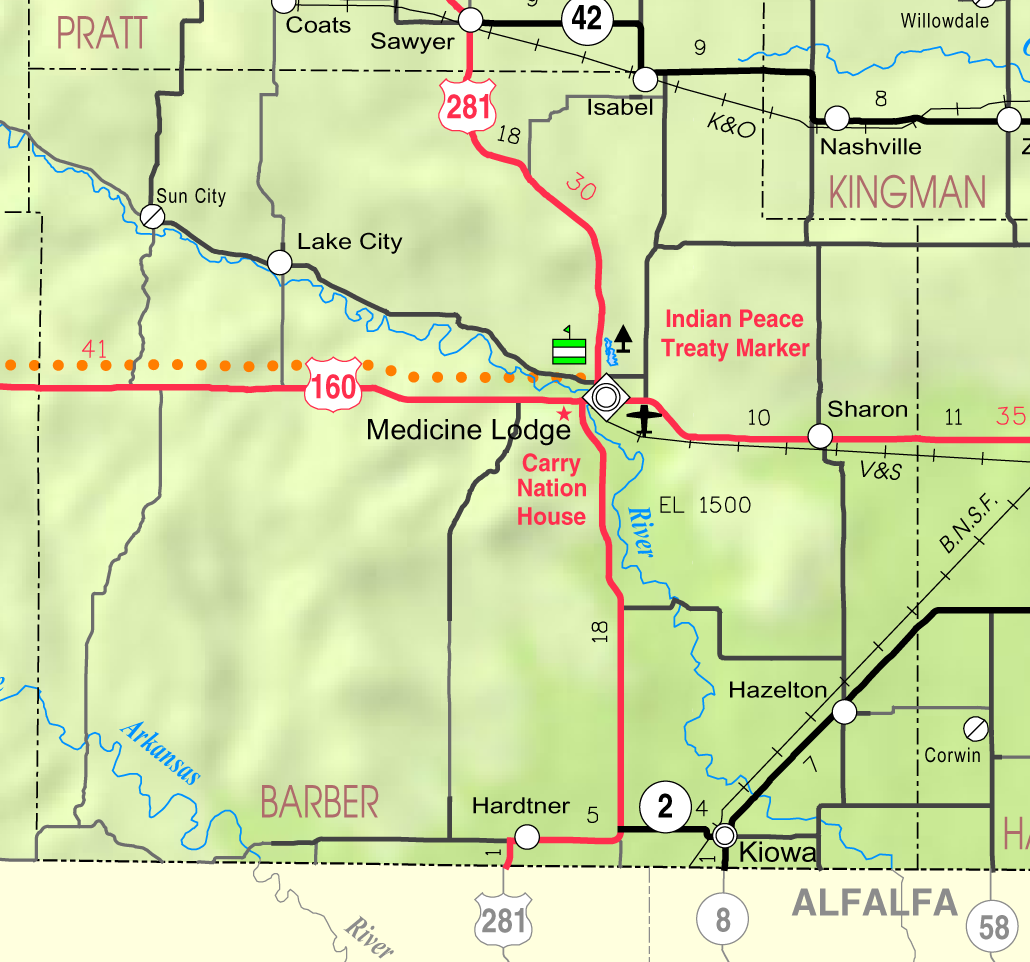
- KDOT map of Barber County (legend)

- Location within Kansas Location within the United States
- Coordinates: 37°14′18″N 98°54′42″W
- Country: United States
- State: Kansas
- County: Barber
- Township: Deerhead
- Elevation: 1,952 ft (595 m)
- Time zone: UTC-6 (CST)
  - Summer (DST): UTC-5 (CDT)
- ZIP Code: 67071
- Area code: 620
- FIPS code: 20-17275
- GNIS ID: 484520

Deerhead is an unincorporated community in Deerhead Township, Barber County, Kansas, United States. It is located 18 miles (29 km) west-southwest of Medicine Lodge.

== History ==
A post office in Deerhead was established in 1885, closed temporarily in 1894, reopened in 1895, and closed permanently in 1923.

== Geography ==
=== Climate ===
The climate in this area is characterized by hot, humid summers and generally mild to cool winters. According to the Köppen Climate Classification system, Deerhead has a humid subtropical climate, abbreviated "Cfa" on climate maps.
