= Gerlane, Kansas =

Unincorporated community in Barber County, Kansas

- Unincorporated community
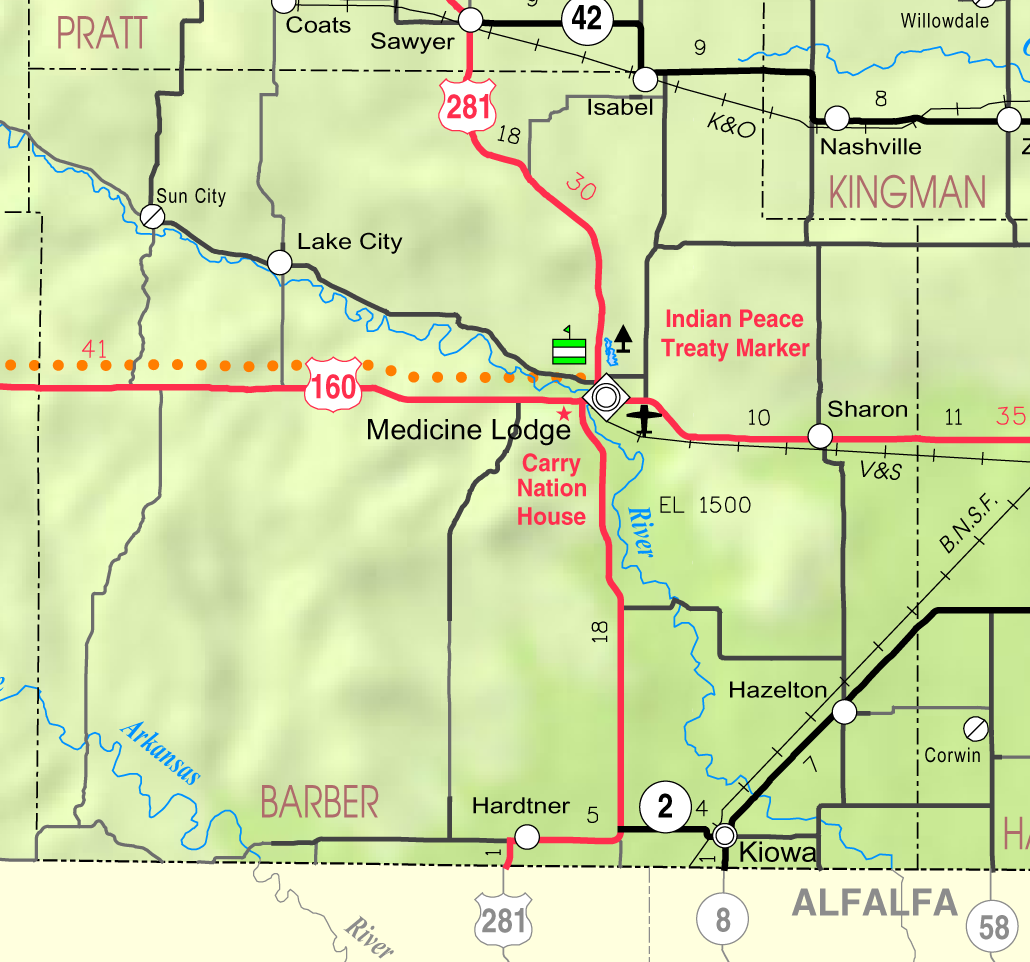
- KDOT map of Barber County (legend)

- Location within Kansas Location within the United States
- Coordinates: 37°09′09″N 98°32′59″W
- Country: United States
- State: Kansas
- County: Barber
- Township: Moore
- Elevation: 1,398 ft (426 m)
- Time zone: UTC-6 (CST)
  - Summer (DST): UTC-5 (CDT)
- ZIP Code: 67070
- Area code: 620
- FIPS code: 20-26140
- GNIS ID: 484521

Gerlane is an unincorporated community in Moore Township, Barber County, Kansas, United States. It is located 9 miles (14 km) south of Medicine Lodge.

== History ==
Gerlane once had its own bank, the Gerlane State Bank, chartered in 1917. Gerlane was situated on the Atchison, Topeka and Santa Fe Railway, but declined after the tracks were removed in 1942.

A post office was opened in Gerlane in 1909, and remained in operation until it was discontinued in 1943.

Many people in the region continued to collect free water from a functioning well until the early 1970s.
