= Pixley, Kansas =

Unincorporated community in Barber County, Kansas

- Unincorporated community
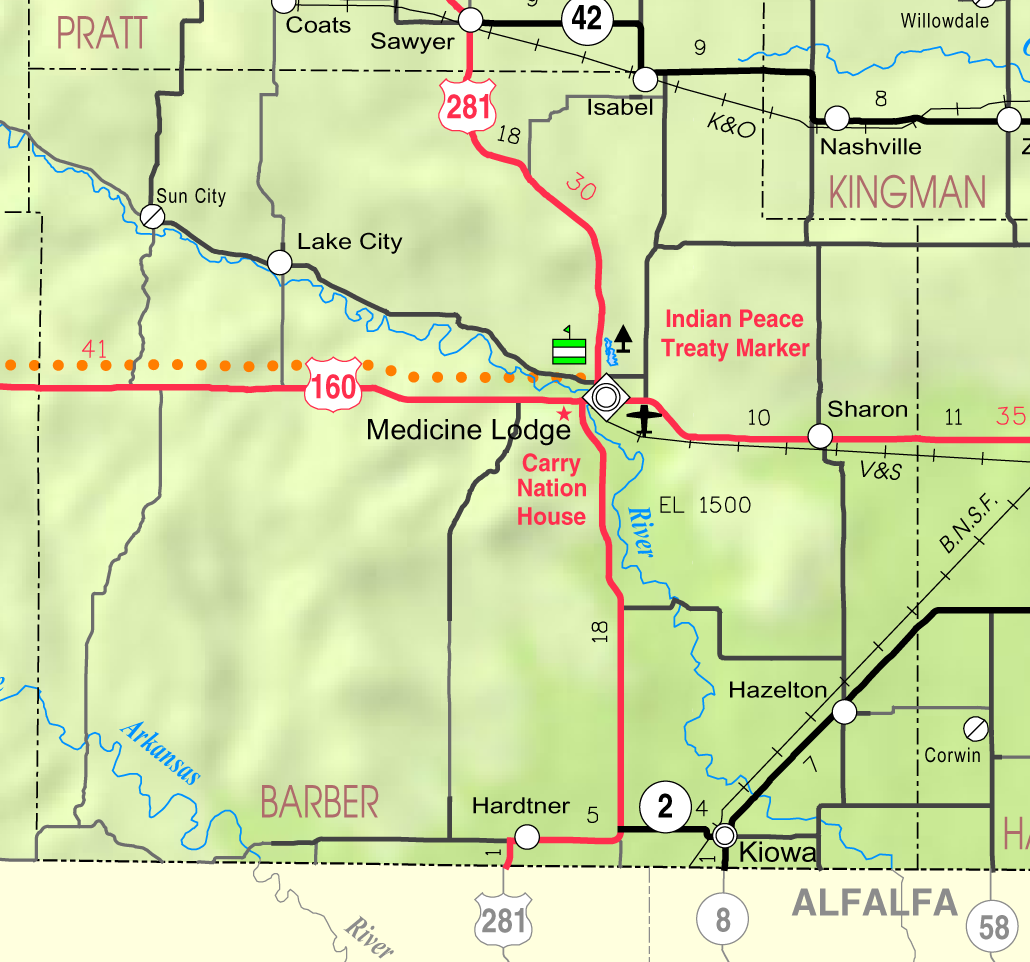
- KDOT map of Barber County (legend)

- Location within Kansas Location within the United States
- Coordinates: 37°15′07″N 98°30′49″W
- Country: United States
- State: Kansas
- County: Barber
- Township: Medicine Lodge
- Elevation: 1,513 ft (461 m)
- Time zone: UTC-6 (CST)
  - Summer (DST): UTC-5 (CDT)
- ZIP Code: 67104
- Area code: 620
- FIPS code: 20-56075
- GNIS ID: 484519

Pixley is an unincorporated community in Medicine Lodge Township, Barber County, Kansas, United States. It is located 4 miles (6.4 km) southeast of Medicine Lodge.

== History ==
Pixley had a post office from 1892 until 1897.

== See also ==
- Fictional Hooterville and Pixley
