= Township 12, Pratt County, Kansas =

Township in Pratt County, Kansas, U.S.

Township 12
- Township
- Location within Pratt County
- Coordinates: 37.612412°N 98.643133°W
- Country: United States
- State: Kansas
- County: Pratt
- Established: 1970s

Government
  - County Commissioner Districts 1, 2, and 3: Tom Jones, Morgan Trinkle, and Rick Shriver

Area
  - Total: 123.882 sq mi (320.85 km^{2})
  - Land: 123.618 sq mi (320.17 km^{2})
  - Water: 0.264 sq mi (0.68 km^{2}) 0.21%

Population (2020)
  - Total: 886
  - Density: 7.17/sq mi (2.77/km^{2})
- Time zone: UTC-6 (CST)
  - Summer (DST): UTC-5 (CDT)
- Area code: 620
- GNIS feature ID: 473919

Township 12 is a township in Pratt County, Kansas, United States. As of the 2020 census, its population was 886.

== History ==
Township 12 was made up of all of the former McPherson, Saratoga, and Center Townships, as well as the parts of the former Iuka and Valley Townships. All were dissolved in the 1970s to create Township 12.

== Geography ==
Township 12 covers an area of 123.882 square miles (320.85 square kilometers). The South Fork Ninnescah River flows through it. The city of Pratt (outside of its airport) is completely surrounded by the township, but is independent of it.

=== Adjacent townships ===
Township 6, Pratt County
Township 7, Pratt County	northwest	north	northeast	Dresden Township, Kingman County
Township 9, Pratt County	west	self	east	Rural Township, Kingman County
Township 10, Pratt County	southwest	south	southeast	Kingman Township, Kingman County
Township 11, Pratt County

== Transportation ==
=== Major highways ===
- US-54
- US-281
- US-400
- K-61
