= Nippawalla Township, Kansas =

Nippawalla Township
- Township
- Location in Barber County
- Coordinates: 37°09′43″N 098°33′11″W
- Country: United States
- State: Kansas
- County: Barber

Area
  - Total: 54.34 sq mi (140.74 km^{2})
  - Land: 54.20 sq mi (140.37 km^{2})
  - Water: 0.14 sq mi (0.36 km^{2}) 0.26%
- Elevation: 1,398 ft (426 m)

Population (2000)
  - Total: 26
  - Density: 0.52/sq mi (0.2/km^{2})
- GNIS feature ID: 0470541

Nippawalla Township is a township in Barber County, Kansas, United States. As of the 2000 census, its population was 26.

== Geography ==
Nippawalla Township covers an area of 54.34 square miles (140.7 km^{2}) and contains no incorporated settlements. According to the USGS, it contains one cemetery, Liberty.

The streams of Brush Creek and Wilson Slough run through this township.
