= Lake City Township, Kansas =

Lake City Township
- Township
- Location in Barber County
- Coordinates: 37°20′00″N 098°48′01″W
- Country: United States
- State: Kansas
- County: Barber

Area
  - Total: 42.08 sq mi (108.99 km^{2})
  - Land: 42.00 sq mi (108.77 km^{2})
  - Water: 0.085 sq mi (0.22 km^{2}) 0.2%
- Elevation: 1,598 ft (487 m)

Population (2000)
  - Total: 83
  - Density: 2.1/sq mi (0.8/km^{2})
- GNIS feature ID: 0470441

Lake City Township is a township in Barber County, Kansas, United States. As of the 2000 census, its population was 83.

== Geography ==
Lake City Township covers an area of 42.08 square miles (109.0 km^{2}) and contains no incorporated settlements.

The streams of Cottonwood Creek, Dog Creek, Little Bear Creek, Little Driftwood Creek, Little Mule Creek, Oak Creek, Puckett Creek, Sand Creek and Sand Creek run through this township.

== Communities ==
It contains the census-designated place of Lake City.

== Transportation ==
Lake City Township contains one airport or landing strip, Mills Landing Strip.
