= Lake City, Kansas =

Unincorporated community in Barber County, Kansas

- Unincorporated community and CDP
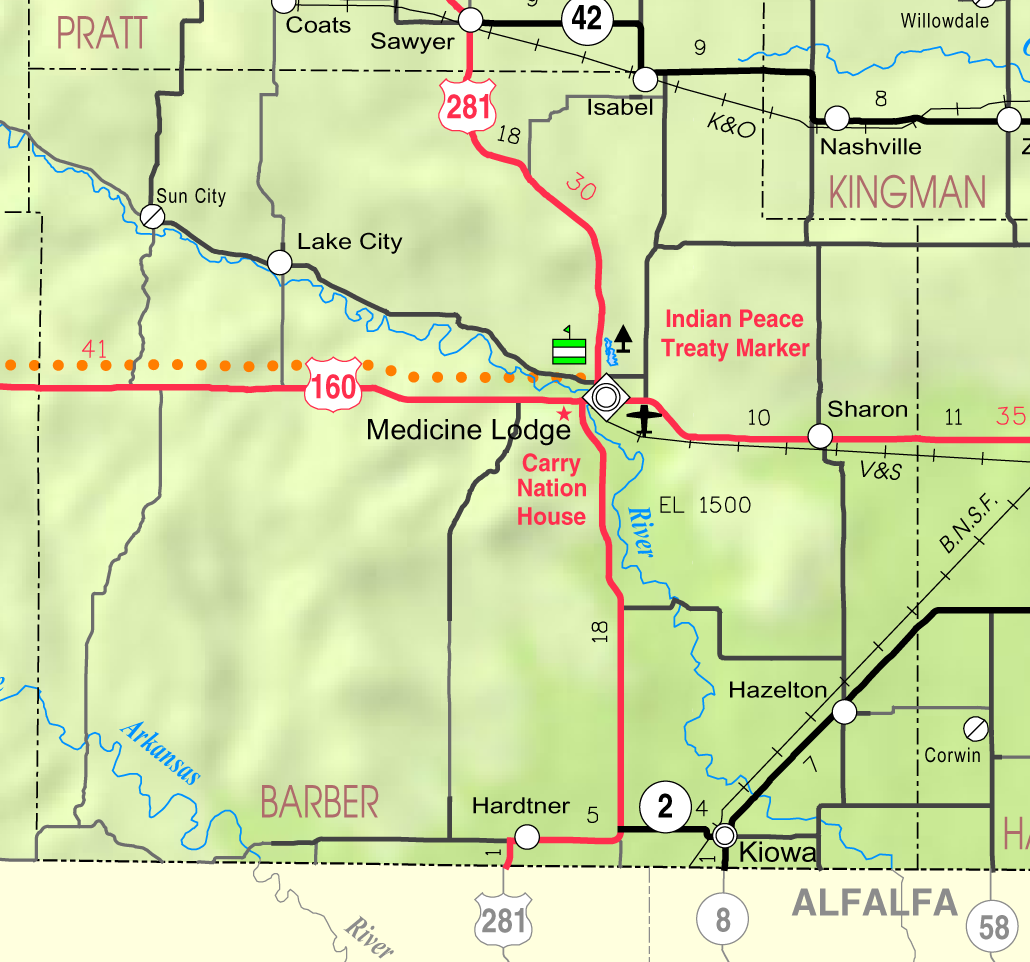
- KDOT map of Barber County (legend)

- Location within Kansas Location within the United States
- Coordinates: 37°21′12″N 98°49′15″W
- Country: United States
- State: Kansas
- County: Barber
- Township: Lake City
- Named for: Riley Lake
- Elevation: 1,611 ft (491 m)

Population (2020)
  - Total: 47
- Time zone: UTC-6 (CST)
  - Summer (DST): UTC-5 (CDT)
- ZIP Code: 67071
- Area code: 620
- FIPS code
- GNIS ID: 470431

Lake City is an unincorporated community and census-designated place (CDP) in Lake City Township, Barber County, Kansas, United States. As of the 2020 census, the population was 47. It is located 14 miles (23 km) northwest of Medicine Lodge.

== History ==
Lake City was named for Riley Lake, who opened a store there in 1878.

A post office was opened in Lake City in 1873, and remained in operation until it was discontinued in 1993.

== Demographics ==
Historical population
Census	Pop.	Note	%±
2020	47		—
U.S. Decennial Census

The 2020 United States census counted 47 people, 16 households, and 13 families in Lake City. The population density was 19.6 per square mile (7.5/km^{2}). There were 26 housing units at an average density of 10.8 per square mile (4.2/km^{2}). The racial makeup was 100.0% (47) white or European American (100.0% non-Hispanic white), 0.0% (0) black or African-American, 0.0% (0) Native American or Alaska Native, 0.0% (0) Asian, 0.0% (0) Pacific Islander or Native Hawaiian, 0.0% (0) from other races, and 0.0% (0) from two or more races. Hispanic or Latino of any race was 0.0% (0) of the population.

Of the 16 households, 25.0% had children under the age of 18; 81.2% were married couples living together; 0.0% had a female householder with no spouse or partner present. 6.2% of households consisted of individuals and 6.2% had someone living alone who was 65 years of age or older. The average household size was 2.9 and the average family size was 2.9.

17.0% of the population was under the age of 18, 0.0% from 18 to 24, 17.0% from 25 to 44, 29.8% from 45 to 64, and 36.2% who were 65 years of age or older. The median age was 58.8 years. For every 100 females, there were 123.8 males. For every 100 females ages 18 and older, there were 116.7 males.
