= Sharon Township, Kansas =

Sharon Township
- Township
- Location in Barber County
- Coordinates: 37°17′29″N 98°24′22″W
- Country: United States
- State: Kansas
- County: Barber

Area
  - Total: 72.78 sq mi (188.49 km^{2})
  - Land: 72.72 sq mi (188.34 km^{2})
  - Water: 0.058 sq mi (0.15 km^{2}) 0.077%
- Elevation: 1,480 ft (451 m)

Population (2010)
  - Total: 356
  - Density: 4.9/sq mi (1.9/km^{2})
- GNIS ID: 470494

Sharon Township is a township in Barber County, Kansas, United States. As of the 2000 census, its population was 369. However, according to the Kansas State Historical Society, the township had already merged with neighboring Ridge Township as of March 22, 1999. Ridge Township was still listed as a separate entity in the 2000 census. By the 2010 census, Ridge was no longer listed, and only the surviving, now larger, Sharon Township was listed.

== Geography ==
Sharon Township covers an area of 36.69 square miles (95.0 km^{2}) and contains one incorporated settlement, Sharon. According to the USGS, it contains two cemeteries: Saint Boniface and Sharon.

The stream of East Branch Little Sandy Creek runs through this township.

The infobox at right updates the statistics according to the 2010 census after the merger with Ridge Township. The township basically doubled in physical size, although its population actually declined, even with the extra territory of Ridge Township.
