= Sharon, Kansas =

City in Kiowa County, Kansas

- City
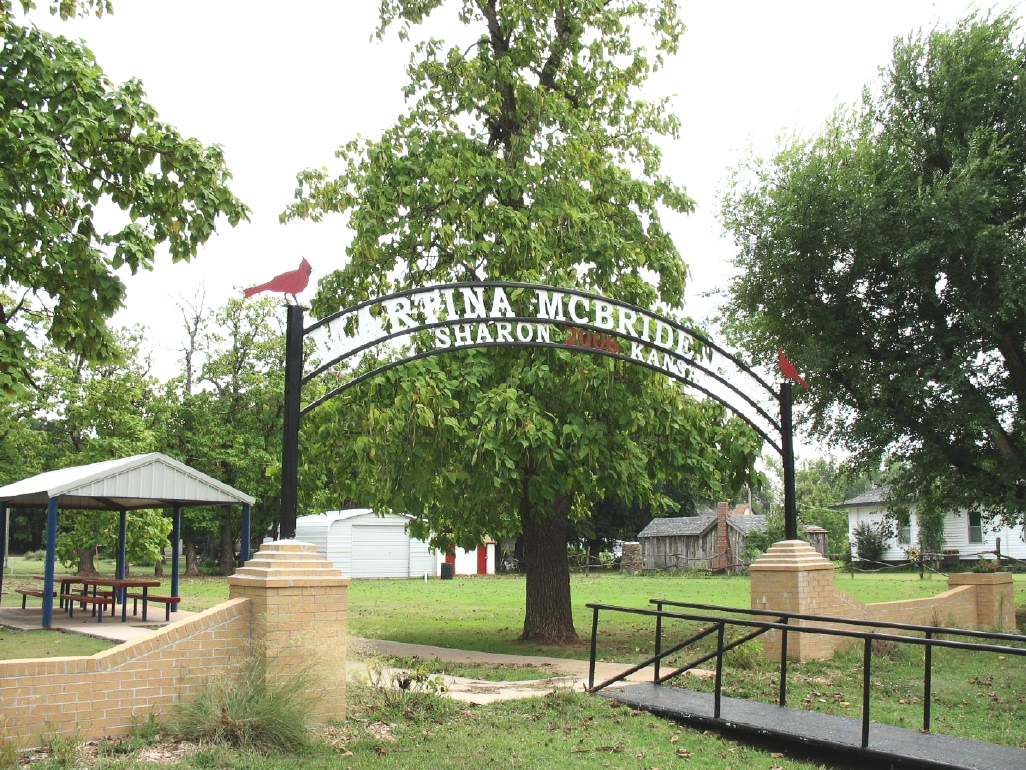
- Martina McBride Park (2009)

- Location within Barber County and Kansas

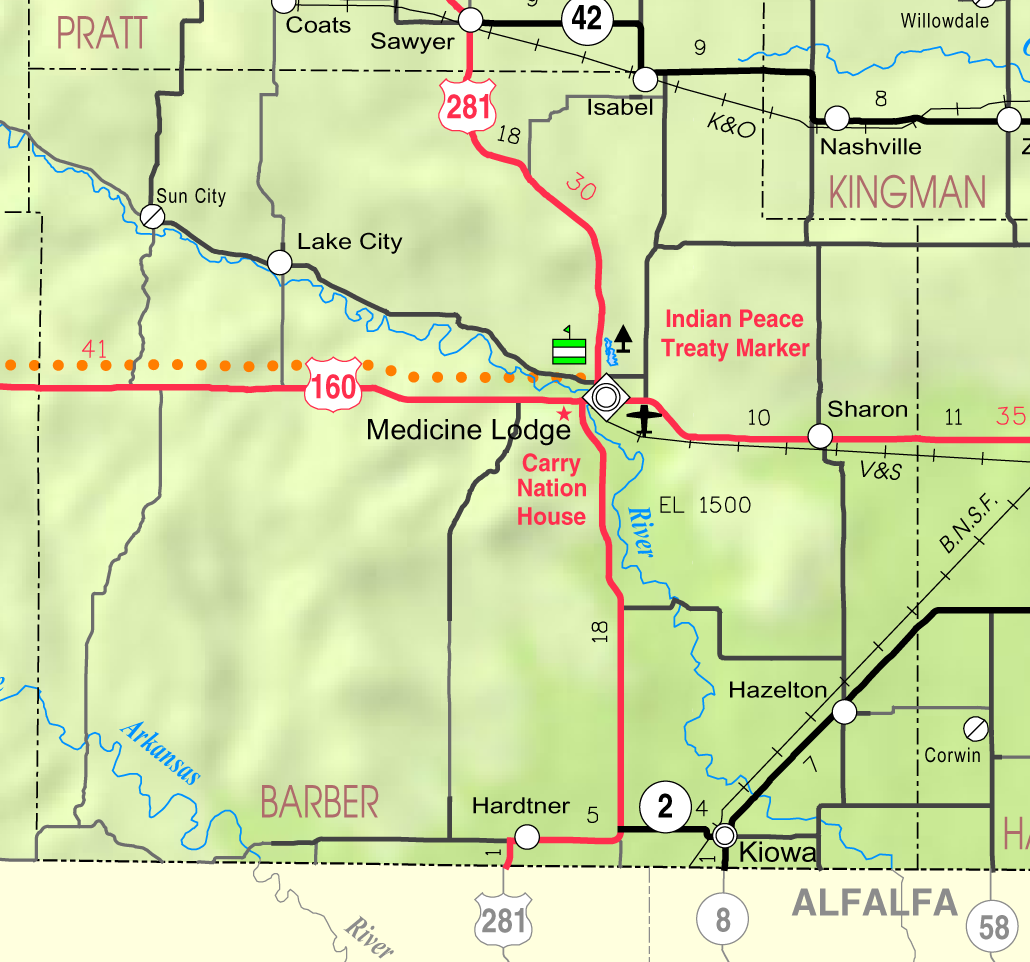
- KDOT map of Barber County (legend)
- Coordinates: 37°15′0″N 98°25′03″W
- Country: United States
- State: Kansas
- County: Barber
- Township: Sharon
- Founded: 1883
- Incorporated: 1885
- Named for: Sharon

Area
  - Total: 0.28 sq mi (0.73 km^{2})
  - Land: 0.28 sq mi (0.73 km^{2})
  - Water: 0 sq mi (0.00 km^{2})
- Elevation: 1,457 ft (444 m)

Population (2020)
  - Total: 147
  - Density: 520/sq mi (200/km^{2})
- Time zone: UTC-6 (CST)
  - Summer (DST): UTC-5 (CDT)
- ZIP Code: 67138
- Area code: 620
- FIPS code: 20-64325
- GNIS ID: 2395857

Sharon is a city in Sharon Township, Barber County, Kansas, United States. As of the 2020 census, the population of the city was 147.

== History ==
Sharon was founded in 1883. Sharon is a Hebrew name meaning "plain".

== Geography ==
According to the United States Census Bureau, the city has a total area of 0.29 square miles (0.75 km^{2}), all land.

== Demographics ==
Historical population
| Census | Pop. | Note | %± |
|---|---|---|---|
| 1900 | 116 | | — |
| 1910 | 350 | | 201.7% |
| 1920 | 325 | | −7.1% |
| 1930 | 316 | | −2.8% |
| 1940 | 296 | | −6.3% |
| 1950 | 278 | | −6.1% |
| 1960 | 272 | | −2.2% |
| 1970 | 265 | | −2.6% |
| 1980 | 283 | | 6.8% |
| 1990 | 256 | | −9.5% |
| 2000 | 210 | | −18.0% |
| 2010 | 158 | | −24.8% |
| 2020 | 147 | | −7.0% |
U.S. Decennial Census

=== 2010 census ===
As of the census of 2010, there were 158 people, 77 households, and 48 families residing in the city. The population density was 544.8 inhabitants per square mile (210.3/km^{2}). There were 98 housing units at an average density of 337.9 per square mile (130.5/km^{2}). The racial makeup of the city was 90.5% White, 0.6% African American, 3.2% Native American, 0.6% Asian, and 5.1% from two or more races.

There were 77 households, of which 19.5% had children under the age of 18 living with them, 51.9% were married couples living together, 7.8% had a female householder with no husband present, 2.6% had a male householder with no wife present, and 37.7% were non-families. 36.4% of all households were made up of individuals, and 14.3% had someone living alone who was 65 years of age or older. The average household size was 2.05 and the average family size was 2.63.

The median age in the city was 49.8 years. 16.5% of residents were under the age of 18; 6.9% were between the ages of 18 and 24; 18.4% were from 25 to 44; 34.2% were from 45 to 64; and 24.1% were 65 years of age or older. The gender makeup of the city was 51.3% male and 48.7% female.

=== 2000 census ===
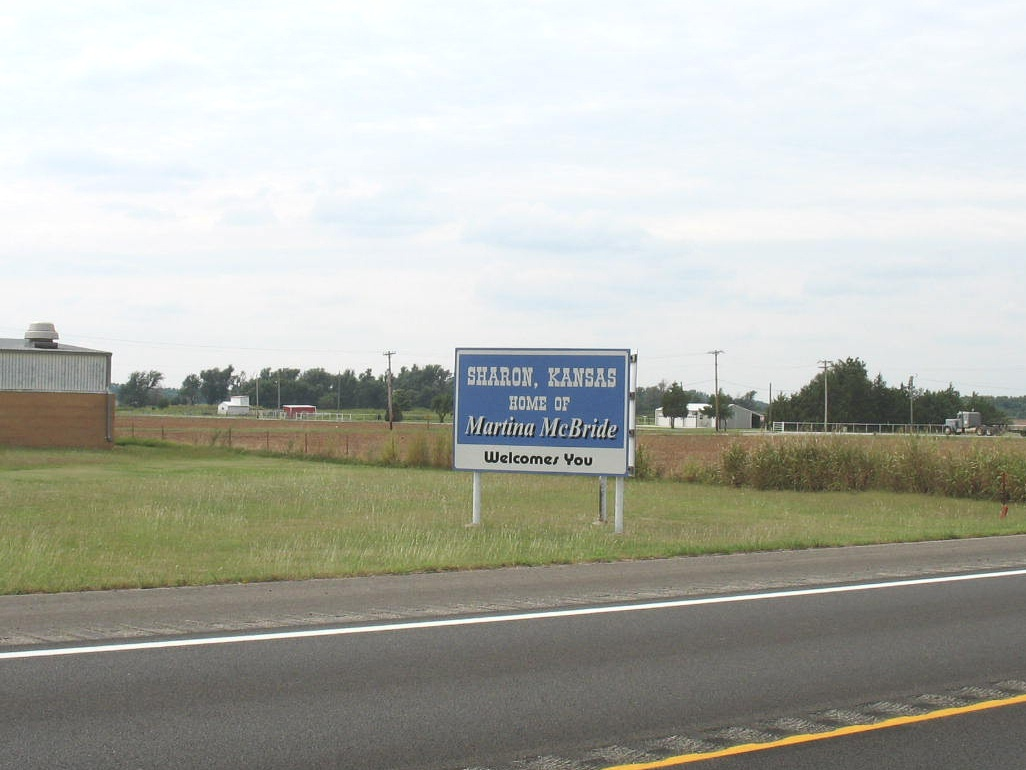
Sharon Welcome Sign signifying Martina McBride's home (2009)

As of the census of 2000, there were 210 people, 91 households, and 54 families residing in the city. The population density was 713.4 inhabitants per square mile (275.4/km^{2}). There were 100 housing units at an average density of 339.7 per square mile (131.2/km^{2}). The racial makeup of the city was 95.24% White, 2.38% Native American, 0.48% Asian, 0.48% from other races, and 1.43% from two or more races. Hispanic or Latino of any race were 0.48% of the population.

There were 91 households, out of which 25.3% had children under the age of 18 living with them, 56.0% were married couples living together, 4.4% had a female householder with no husband present, and 39.6% were non-families. 35.2% of all households were made up of individuals, and 24.2% had someone living alone who was 65 years of age or older. The average household size was 2.31 and the average family size was 3.05.

In the city, the population was spread out, with 26.2% under the age of 18, 3.8% from 18 to 24, 20.0% from 25 to 44, 27.6% from 45 to 64, and 22.4% who were 65 years of age or older. The median age was 45 years. For every 100 females, there were 85.8 males. For every 100 females age 18 and over, there were 80.2 males.

The median income for a household in the city was $37,188, and the median income for a family was $43,056. Males had a median income of $30,500 versus $20,625 for females. The per capita income for the city was $12,759. None of the families and 4.0% of the population were living below the poverty line, including none under 18 and 5.6% of those over 64.

== Education ==
The community is served by Barber County North USD 254 public school district..

Sharon schools were closed through school unification. The Sharon Cardinals won the Kansas State High School boys class B basketball championship in 1935 and the 8-Man football championship in 1977.

== Notable people ==
- Orville Brown (1908–1981), professional wrestler, thirteen-time world champion, recognized as the first NWA World Heavyweight Champion in 1948
- Martina McBride (b. 1966), country music singer, songwriter, record producer
