= Sun City Township, Kansas =

Sun City Township
- Township
- Location in Barber County
- Coordinates: 37°22′40″N 098°56′01″W
- Country: United States
- State: Kansas
- County: Barber

Area
  - Total: 48.00 sq mi (124.31 km^{2})
  - Land: 47.95 sq mi (124.19 km^{2})
  - Water: 0.046 sq mi (0.12 km^{2}) 0.1%
- Elevation: 1,680 ft (512 m)

Population (2000)
  - Total: 100
  - Density: 2.1/sq mi (0.8/km^{2})
- GNIS feature ID: 1729705

Sun City Township is a township in Barber County, Kansas, United States. As of the 2000 census, its population was 100.

== Geography ==
Sun City Township covers an area of 47.99 square miles (124.3 km^{2}) and contains one incorporated settlement, Sun City. According to the USGS, it contains one cemetery, Sunnyside.

The streams of Bear Creek, Elk Creek, Mulberry Creek, North Elk Creek, South Elk Creek and Turkey Creek run through this township.
