= Hazelton Township, Kansas =

Hazelton Township
- Township
- Location in Barber County
- Coordinates: 37°04′49″N 098°24′45″W
- Country: United States
- State: Kansas
- County: Barber

Area
  - Total: 73.36 sq mi (190.01 km^{2})
  - Land: 73.12 sq mi (189.38 km^{2})
  - Water: 0.24 sq mi (0.62 km^{2}) 0.33%
- Elevation: 1,352 ft (412 m)

Population (2000)
  - Total: 213
  - Density: 2.8/sq mi (1.1/km^{2})
- GNIS feature ID: 0470548

Hazelton Township is a township in Barber County, Kansas, United States. As of the 2000 census, its population was 213.

== Geography ==
Hazelton Township covers an area of 73.36 square miles (190.0 km^{2}) and contains one incorporated settlement, Hazelton. According to the USGS, it contains one cemetery, Rosehill.

Harqis Lake and Spicer Lake are within this township. The stream of Spring Creek runs through this township.
