= Township 9, Pratt County, Kansas =

Township in Pratt County, Kansas, U.S.

Township 9
- Township
- Location within Pratt County
- Coordinates: 37.65288°N 98.888291°W
- Country: United States
- State: Kansas
- County: Pratt
- Established: 1970s

Government
  - County Commissioner Districts 2 and 3: Morgan Trinkle and Rick Shriver

Area
  - Total: 146.752 sq mi (380.09 km^{2})
  - Land: 146.68 sq mi (379.9 km^{2})
  - Water: 0.072 sq mi (0.19 km^{2}) 0.05%

Population (2020)
  - Total: 268
  - Density: 1.83/sq mi (0.705/km^{2})
- Time zone: UTC-6 (CST)
  - Summer (DST): UTC-5 (CDT)
- Area code: 620
- GNIS feature ID: 473909

Township 9 is a township in Pratt County, Kansas, United States. As of the 2020 census, its population was 268.

== History ==
Township 9 was originally made up of McClellan, Banner, and Richland Townships. Parts of McClellan and Richland Townships were used to make Ninnescah Township in the 1910s. All of those townships were dissolved and merged into Township 9 in the 1970s.

== Geography ==
Township 9 covers an area of 146.752 square miles (308.09 square kilometers).

=== Communities ===
- Cullison

=== Adjacent townships ===
Township 8, Pratt County
Lincoln Township, Edwards County	northwest	north	northeast	Township 7, Pratt County
Kiowa Rural Township, Kiowa County	west	self	east	Township 12, Pratt County
		south	southeast	Township 11, Pratt County
Township 10, Pratt County

== Transportation ==
=== Major highways ===
- US-54
- US-400
