= Kiowa Rural Township, Kansas =

Kiowa Rural Township
- Township
- Map of Kiowa County
- Coordinates: 37°25′46″N 99°29′33″W
- Country: United States
- State: Kansas
- County: Kiowa

Area
  - Total: 722.4 sq mi (1,871.0 km^{2})
  - Land: 722.2 sq mi (1,870.5 km^{2})
  - Water: 0.19 sq mi (0.5 km^{2}) 0.03%
- Elevation: 2,182 ft (665 m)

Population (2020)
  - Total: 2,460
  - Density: 3.41/sq mi (1.32/km^{2})
- Time zone: UTC-6 (Central (CST))
  - Summer (DST): UTC-5 (CDT)
- Area code: 620
- GNIS ID: 470707

Kiowa Rural Township is the sole township in Kiowa County, Kansas, United States. As of the 2020, the population of the township was 2,460, out of whom 1,615 lived in one of the township's three cities and 845 lived in unincorporated areas of the township. Kiowa Rural Township's boundaries are identical to those of Kiowa County: there are no other townships in the county, and none of the county's cities are governmentally independent.

== History ==
Kiowa Rural Township was once named simply "Kiowa Township." It has not always been the only township in the county: until 1980-01-01, when all existing townships in the county were dissolved, there was also Martin Township, located near Mullinville in the western part of the county, and Wellsford Township (previously Dowell Township), located near Haviland in the eastern part of the county. Even these three townships were significantly expanded from past years; in 1940, Kiowa County was composed of fifteen townships: Brenham, Butler, Center, Garfield, Glick, Highland, Kiowa, Lincoln, Martin, Reeder, Union, Ursula, Valley, Wellsford, and Westland. Although it includes the territories of those former townships, Kiowa Rural Township itself is not important to local government, having become inactive.

== Geography ==
Because Kiowa Rural Township is coterminous with the county, its statistics are similar to the county's. It covers an area of 722.39 square miles (1871.0 square kilometers); of this, 0.2 square miles (0.5 square kilometers) or 0.03%, is water.

Six cemeteries are located in the township: Belvidere, Boles, Fairview, Haviland, Hillcrest, and McKinley.

=== Communities ===
Seven populated places are located in Kiowa Rural Township:

- Belvidere
- Brenham
- Greensburg
- Haviland
- Joy
- Mullinville
- Wellsford

=== Adjacent townships ===
- South Brown Township, Edwards County — northern border, west
- Franklin Township, Edwards County — northern border, central
- Lincoln Township, Edwards County — northern border, east
- Township 8, Pratt County — northeastern corner
- Township 9, Pratt County — eastern border, north
- Township 10, Pratt County — eastern border, central
- Turkey Creek Township, Barber County — eastern border, south
- Powell Township, Comanche County — southern border, east
- Coldwater Township, Comanche County — southern border, central
- Protection Township, Comanche County — southern border, west
- Lexington Township, Clark County — southwestern corner
- Liberty Township, Clark County — western border, south
- Bucklin Township, Ford County — western border, central and north
- Wheatland Township, Ford County — northwestern corner

== Transportation ==
Major highways in Kiowa Rural Township include U.S. Routes 54, 183, and 400. As well, two airports are located in the township: Gail Ballard Municipal Airport and Paul Windle Municipal Field.
