= Isabel, Kansas =

City in Kiowa County, Kansas

- City
- Location within Barber County and Kansas

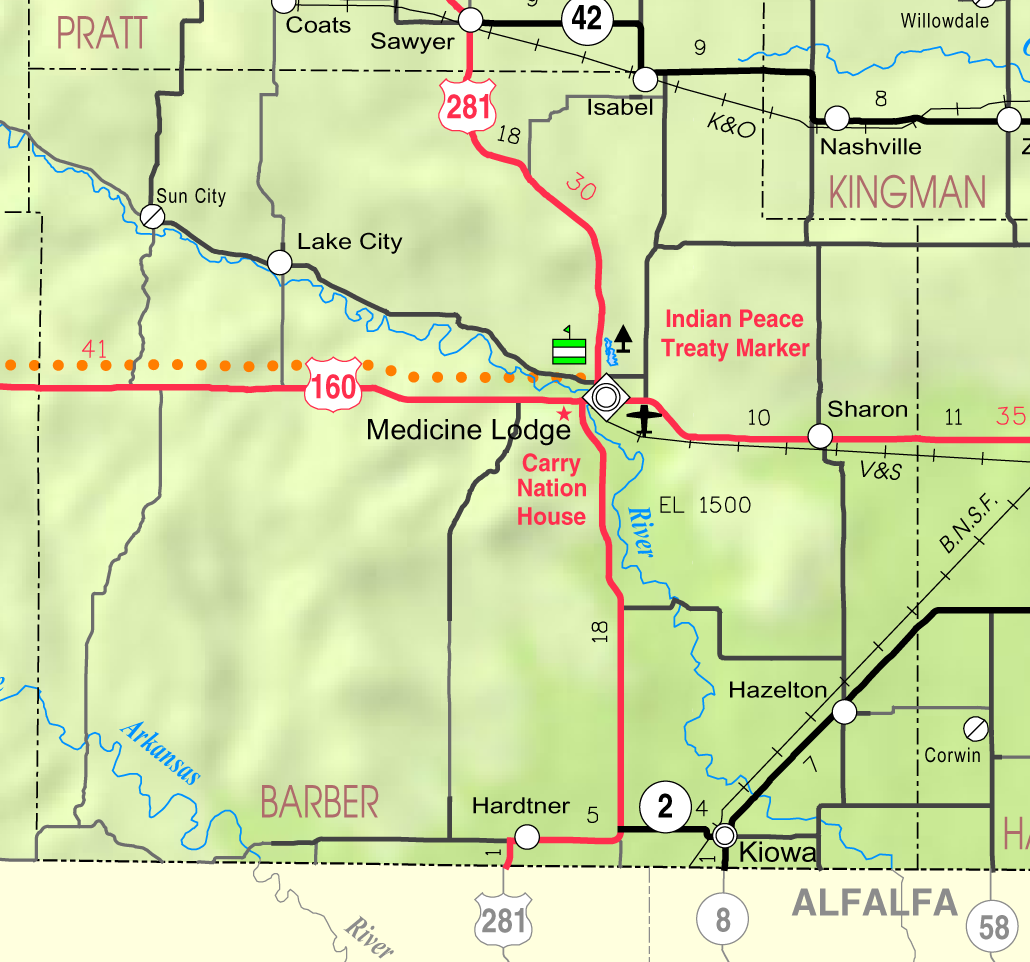
- KDOT map of Barber County (legend)
- Coordinates: 37°28′02″N 98°33′05″W
- Country: United States
- State: Kansas
- County: Barber
- Township: Valley
- Founded: 1887
- Incorporated: 1909

Area
  - Total: 0.25 sq mi (0.65 km^{2})
  - Land: 0.25 sq mi (0.65 km^{2})
  - Water: 0 sq mi (0.00 km^{2})
- Elevation: 1,847 ft (563 m)

Population (2020)
  - Total: 68
  - Density: 270/sq mi (100/km^{2})
- Time zone: UTC-6 (CST)
  - Summer (DST): UTC-5 (CDT)
- ZIP Code: 67065
- Area code: 620
- FIPS code: 20-34550
- GNIS ID: 2395442

Isabel is a city in Valley Township, Barber County, Kansas, United States. As of the 2020 census, the population of the city was 68.

== History ==
Isabel was founded in 1887. Isabel was named for the daughter of a surveyor.

== Geography ==
According to the United States Census Bureau, the city has a total area of 0.25 square miles (0.65 km^{2}), all land.

Isabel is located on the northern county line, on the Mulvane extension of the Santa Fe, in Valley Township.

== Demographics ==
Historical population
| Census | Pop. | Note | %± |
|---|---|---|---|
| 1910 | 222 | | — |
| 1920 | 341 | | 53.6% |
| 1930 | 279 | | −18.2% |
| 1940 | 252 | | −9.7% |
| 1950 | 205 | | −18.7% |
| 1960 | 181 | | −11.7% |
| 1970 | 147 | | −18.8% |
| 1980 | 137 | | −6.8% |
| 1990 | 104 | | −24.1% |
| 2000 | 108 | | 3.8% |
| 2010 | 90 | | −16.7% |
| 2020 | 68 | | −24.4% |
U.S. Decennial Census

=== 2020 census ===
The 2020 United States census counted 68 people, 23 households, and 17 families in Isabel. The population density was 272.0 per square mile (105.0/km^{2}). There were 38 housing units at an average density of 152.0 per square mile (58.7/km^{2}). The racial makeup was 91.18% (62) white or European American (91.18% non-Hispanic white), 0.0% (0) black or African-American, 0.0% (0) Native American or Alaska Native, 0.0% (0) Asian, 0.0% (0) Pacific Islander or Native Hawaiian, 2.94% (2) from other races, and 5.88% (4) from two or more races. Hispanic or Latino of any race was 1.47% (1) of the population.

Of the 23 households, 26.1% had children under the age of 18; 65.2% were married couples living together; 26.1% had a female householder with no spouse or partner present. 26.1% of households consisted of individuals and 8.7% had someone living alone who was 65 years of age or older. The average household size was 2.0 and the average family size was 2.8. The percent of those with a bachelor's degree or higher was estimated to be 1.5% of the population.

23.5% of the population was under the age of 18, 4.4% from 18 to 24, 19.1% from 25 to 44, 23.5% from 45 to 64, and 29.4% who were 65 years of age or older. The median age was 49.0 years. For every 100 females, there were 142.9 males. For every 100 females ages 18 and older, there were 116.7 males.

The 2016–2020 5-year American Community Survey estimates show that the median household income was $51,513 (with a margin of error of +/- $5,024) and the median family income was $66,250 (+/- $37,352). Males had a median income of $51,324 (+/- $6,738) versus $28,000 (+/- $24,938) for females. The median income for those above 16 years old was $50,000 (+/- $25,738). Approximately, 12.1% of families and 6.6% of the population were below the poverty line, including 3.6% of those under the age of 18 and 8.3% of those ages 65 or over.

=== 2010 census ===
At the 2010 census there were 90 people in 40 households, including 23 families, in the city. The population density was 360.0 inhabitants per square mile (139.0/km^{2}). There were 47 housing units at an average density of 188.0 per square mile (72.6/km^{2}). The racial makup of the city was 96.7% White, 2.2% from other races, and 1.1% from two or more races. Hispanic or Latino of any race were 4.4%.

Of the 40 households 22.5% had children under the age of 18 living with them, 52.5% were married couples living together, 5.0% had a female householder with no husband present, and 42.5% were non-families. 37.5% of households were one person and 7.5% were one person aged 65 or older. The average household size was 2.25 and the average family size was 3.00.

The median age was 37.5 years. 21.1% of residents were under the age of 18; 6.8% were between the ages of 18 and 24; 32.3% were from 25 to 44; 22.3% were from 45 to 64; and 17.8% were 65 or older. The gender makeup of the city was 42.2% male and 57.8% female.

== Transportation ==
The Atchison, Topeka and Santa Fe Railway formerly provided passenger rail service to Isabel on a line between Wichita and Englewood. Dedicated passenger service was provided until at least 1958, while mixed trains continued until at least 1961. As of 2025, the nearest passenger rail station is located in Hutchinson, where Amtrak's Southwest Chief stops once daily on a route from Chicago to Los Angeles.
