= Hazelton, Kansas =

City in Kiowa County, Kansas

- City
- Location within Barber County and Kansas

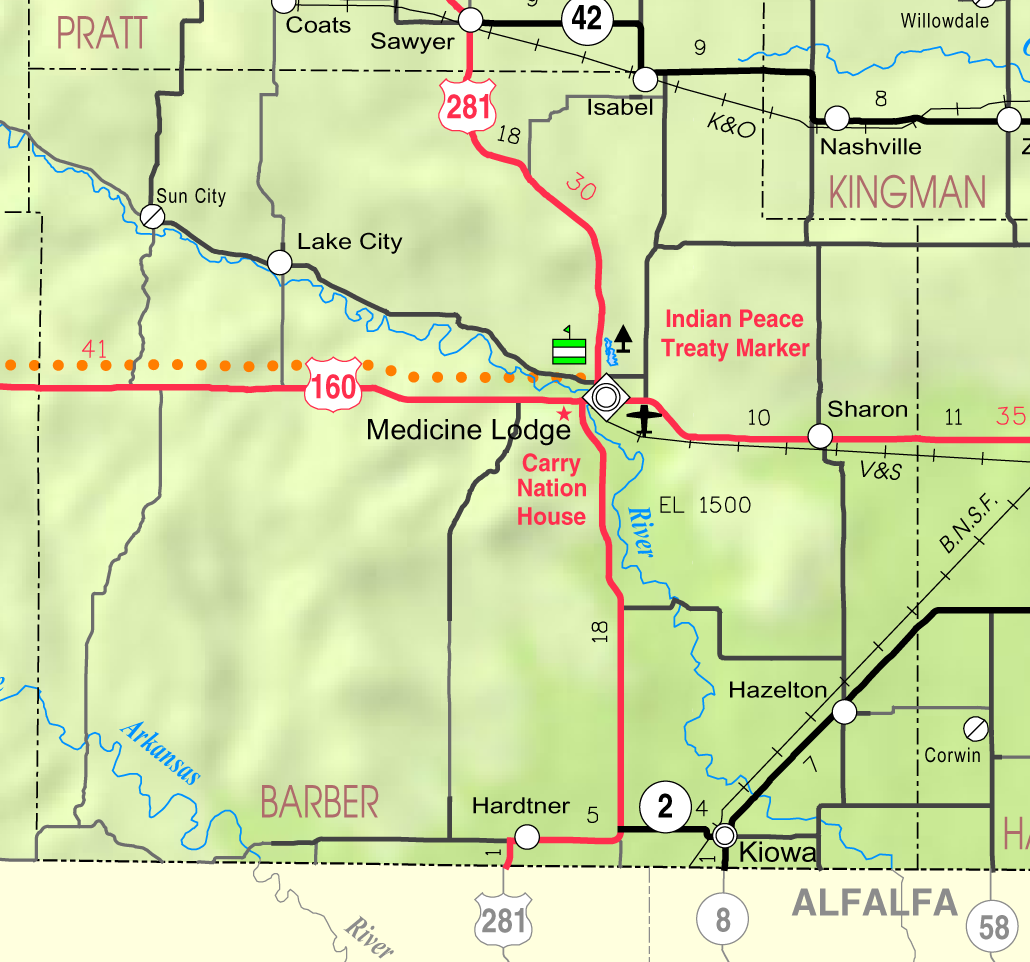
- KDOT map of Barber County (legend)
- Coordinates: 37°05′22″N 98°24′06″W
- Country: United States
- State: Kansas
- County: Barber
- Township: Hazelton
- Founded: 1883
- Incorporated: 1887
- Named for: J. Hazelton

Area
  - Total: 0.59 sq mi (1.54 km^{2})
  - Land: 0.59 sq mi (1.54 km^{2})
  - Water: 0 sq mi (0.00 km^{2})
- Elevation: 1,365 ft (416 m)

Population (2020)
  - Total: 82
  - Density: 140/sq mi (53/km^{2})
- Time zone: UTC-6 (CST)
  - Summer (DST): UTC-5 (CDT)
- ZIP Code: 67061
- Area code: 620
- FIPS code: 20-31150
- GNIS ID: 2394340

Hazelton is a city in Hazelton Township, Barber County, Kansas, United States. As of the 2020 census, the population of the city was 82.

== History ==
Hazelton was founded in 1883. It was named for its founder, Rev. J. Hazelton, a pioneer settler.

The first post office in Hazelton was established in October 1883.

== Geography ==
According to the United States Census Bureau, the city has a total area of 0.57 square miles (1.48 km^{2}), all land.

== Demographics ==
Historical population
Census	Pop.	Note	%±
1890	319		—
1900	143		−55.2%
1910	315		120.3%
1920	281		−10.8%
1930	299		6.4%
1940	260		−13.0%
1950	250		−3.8%
1960	246		−1.6%
1970	176		−28.5%
1980	143		−18.7%
1990	128		−10.5%
2000	144		12.5%
2010	93		−35.4%
2020	82		−11.8%
U.S. Decennial Census

=== 2020 census ===
The 2020 United States census counted 82 people, 48 households, and 36 families in Hazelton. The population density was 138.3 per square mile (53.4/km^{2}). There were 53 housing units at an average density of 89.4 per square mile (34.5/km^{2}). The racial makeup was 96.34% (79) white or European American (96.34% non-Hispanic white), 0.0% (0) black or African-American, 0.0% (0) Native American or Alaska Native, 0.0% (0) Asian, 0.0% (0) Pacific Islander or Native Hawaiian, 1.22% (1) from other races, and 2.44% (2) from two or more races. Hispanic or Latino of any race was 2.44% (2) of the population.

Of the 48 households, 33.3% had children under the age of 18; 43.8% were married couples living together; 16.7% had a female householder with no spouse or partner present. 25.0% of households consisted of individuals and 16.7% had someone living alone who was 65 years of age or older. The average household size was 2.5 and the average family size was 3.3. The percent of those with a bachelor's degree or higher was estimated to be 3.7% of the population.

20.7% of the population was under the age of 18, 4.9% from 18 to 24, 13.4% from 25 to 44, 36.6% from 45 to 64, and 24.4% who were 65 years of age or older. The median age was 52.5 years. For every 100 females, there were 70.8 males. For every 100 females ages 18 and older, there were 75.7 males.

The 2016–2020 5-year American Community Survey estimates show that the median family income was $63,750 (+/- $28,902). Approximately, 17.6% of families and 60.8% of the population were below the poverty line, including 91.2% of those under the age of 18 and 55.6% of those ages 65 or over.

=== 2010 census ===
At the 2010 census, there were 93 people, 45 households and 32 families residing in the city. The population density was 163.2 inhabitants per square mile (63.0/km^{2}). There were 58 housing units at an average density of 101.8 per square mile (39.3/km^{2}). The racial makeup of the city was 90.3% White, 1.1% African American, 1.1% Native American, 3.2% from other races, and 4.3% from two or more races. Hispanic or Latino of any race were 9.7% of the population.

There were 45 households, of which 22.2% had children under the age of 18 living with them, 62.2% were married couples living together, 6.7% had a female householder with no husband present, 2.2% had a male householder with no wife present, and 28.9% were non-families. 28.9% of all households were made up of individuals, and 11.1% had someone living alone who was 65 years of age or older. The average household size was 2.07 and the average family size was 2.47.

The median age was 49.9 years. 16.1% of residents were under the age of 18; 9.7% were between the ages of 18 and 24; 16.2% were from 25 to 44; 35.5% were from 45 to 64; and 22.6% were 65 years of age or older. The gender makeup was 57.0% male and 43.0% female.

== Education ==
Hazelton is served by Unified School District 255 South Barber.

Hazelton High School was closed through school unification. The Hazelton High School mascot was Panthers.
