= Township 7, Pratt County, Kansas =

Township in Pratt County, Kansas, U.S.

Township 7
- Township
- Location within Pratt County
- Coordinates: 37.755322°N 98.730158°W
- Country: United States
- State: Kansas
- County: Pratt
- Established: 1970s

Government
  - County Commissioner District 2: Morgan Trinkle

Area
  - Total: 52.429 sq mi (135.79 km^{2})
  - Land: 52.417 sq mi (135.76 km^{2})
  - Water: 0.012 sq mi (0.031 km^{2}) 0.02%

Population (2020)
  - Total: 267
  - Density: 5.09/sq mi (1.97/km^{2})
- Time zone: UTC-6 (CST)
  - Summer (DST): UTC-5 (CDT)
- Area code: 620
- GNIS feature ID: 473766

Township 7 is a township in Pratt County, Kansas, United States. As of the 2020 census, its population was 267.

== History ==
What is now Township 7 was previously made up of Iuka Township. Iuka Township had a portion of it taken off in 1909 to form Lincoln Township, and in the 1910s another part became part of Ninnescah Township. Iuka, Lincoln, and Ninnescah Townships were dissolved in the 1970s to create Township 7.

== Geography ==
Township 7 covers an area of 52.429 square miles (135.79 square kilometers).

=== Communities ===
- Iuka

=== Adjacent townships ===
Rose Valley Township, Stafford County
		north	northeast	Union Township, Stafford County
Township 8, Pratt County	west	self	east	Township 6, Pratt County
Township 9, Pratt County	southwest	south
Township 12, Pratt County

== Transportation ==
=== Major highways ===
- US-281
- K-61
