= RSI Corporation =

Safety compliance company

RSI Corp.
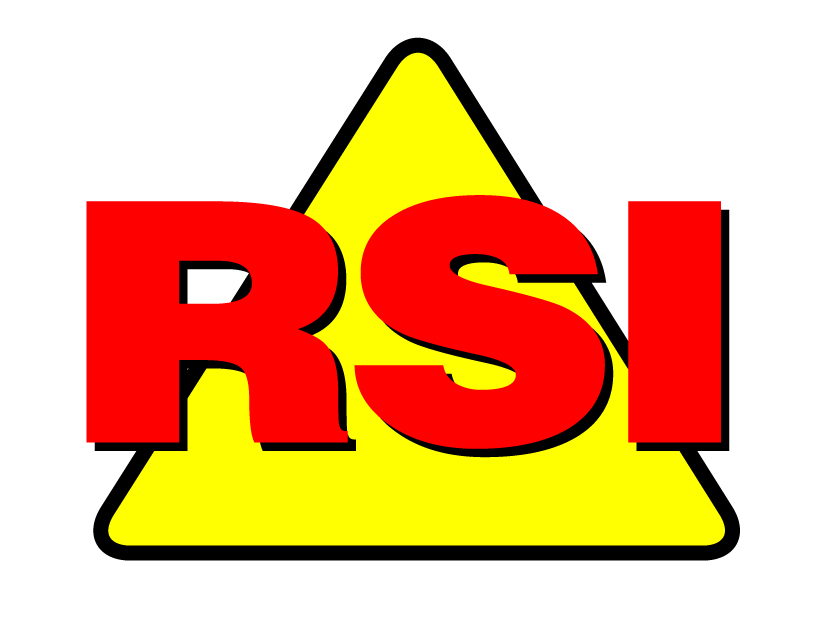
- Founder: Steve Walz
- Headquarters: 543 Main Street, Kiowa, Kansas 67070
- Area served: United States
- Key people: Miranda Walz-Allen (CEO)
- Website: rsicorp.com

RSI Corporation (Radiofrequency Safety International) is a safety compliance consulting firm specializing in the telecommunications industry, located in Kiowa, Kansas, United States. The company's focus is Radio Frequency (RF) compliance and training.

== Founding and History ==
RSI Corporation was founded by Steve Walz and a business partner in 1997. Steve's background includes positions at Halliburton and Dresser Industries, where at one point he looked at environmental safety and came across problems with radio frequency (RF) Dielectric heating. With the passage of the first major overhaul of telecommunications law in over 60 years, the Telecommunications Act of 1996 included regulations restricting human exposure to RF energy. Steve sensed a business opportunity and started RSI to focus on providing safety related services.

== Overview ==
RSI Corp. performs safety plans such as RF hazard assessments (Electromagnetic radiation), provide maximum permissible exposure (MPE is the highest power or energy density) technical reports and performs other services for numerous companies, including major wireless carriers. RSI Corp. has numerous safety training for both telecom and broadcast personnel and the general public.

A federal mandate that requires telecommunications companies and other users of high power electromagnetic energy to comply has created the need for safety companies like RSI Corporation. The Telecommunications Act of 1996, Section 704, concerning radio frequency (RF) radiation went into effect Oct. 15, 1997. The FCC is the primary enforcer of this law, which implements regulations to protect the public and workers from potentially harmful RF radiation. All sites must come into compliance with the new standards for the maximum permissible exposure (MPE) of RF radiation.
