= Sun City, Kansas =

City in Kiowa County, Kansas

- City
- Location within Barber County and Kansas

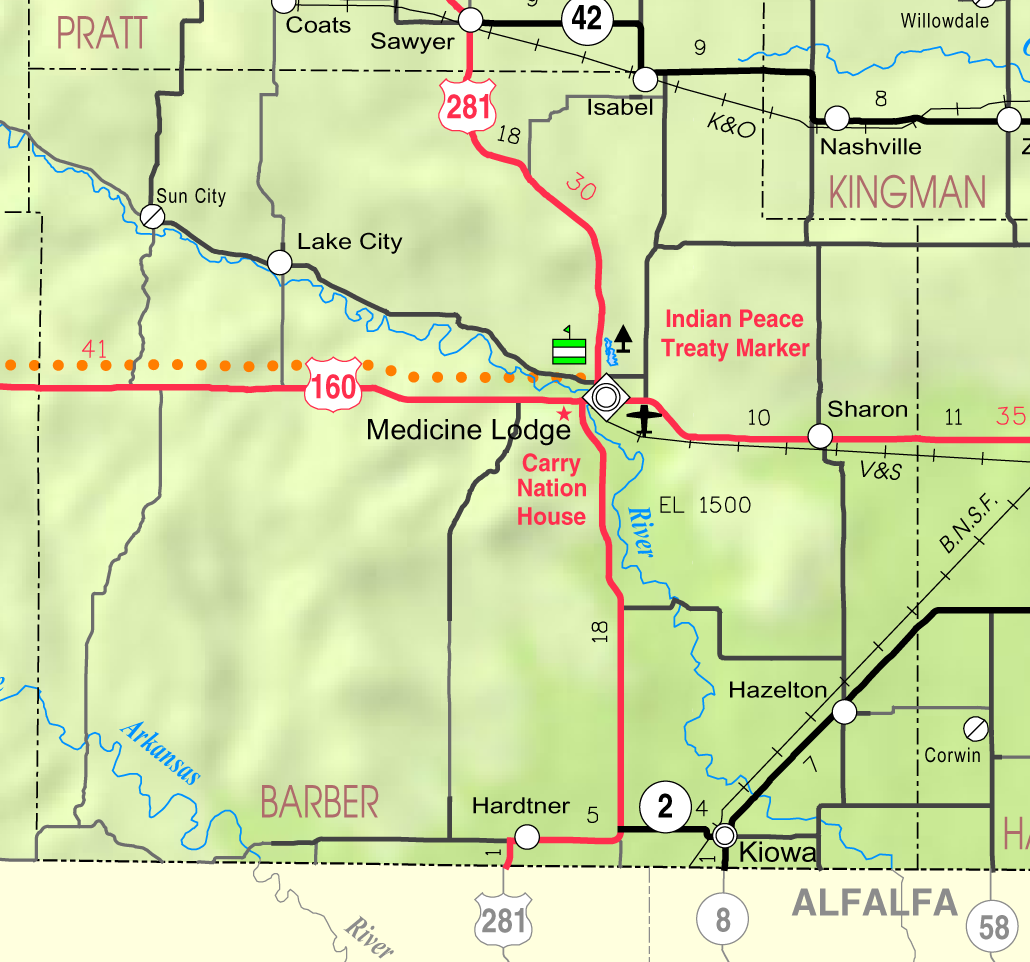
- KDOT map of Barber County (legend)
- Coordinates: 37°22′42″N 98°55′01″W
- Country: United States
- State: Kansas
- County: Barber
- Township: Sun City
- Founded: 1872
- Incorporated: 1919

Area
  - Total: 0.14 sq mi (0.37 km^{2})
  - Land: 0.14 sq mi (0.37 km^{2})
  - Water: 0 sq mi (0.00 km^{2})
- Elevation: 1,677 ft (511 m)

Population (2020)
  - Total: 37
  - Density: 260/sq mi (100/km^{2})
- Time zone: UTC-6 (CST)
  - Summer (DST): UTC-5 (CDT)
- ZIP Code: 67143
- Area code: 620
- FIPS code: 20-69275
- GNIS ID: 2396004

Sun City is a city in Sun City Township, Barber County, Kansas, United States, along the Medicine Lodge River. As of the 2020 census, the population of the city was 37.

== History ==
Sun City was founded in 1872. The first post office in Sun City was established in August 1873.

== Geography ==
According to the United States Census Bureau, the city has a total area of 0.14 square miles (0.36 km^{2}), all land.

=== Climate ===
The climate in this area is characterized by hot, humid summers and generally mild to cool winters. According to the Köppen Climate Classification system, Sun City has a humid subtropical climate, abbreviated "Cfa" on climate maps.

== Demographics ==
Historical population
Census	Pop.	Note	%±
1880	81		—
1930	404		—
1940	305		−24.5%
1950	231		−24.3%
1960	188		−18.6%
1970	119		−36.7%
1980	85		−28.6%
1990	88		3.5%
2000	81		−8.0%
2010	53		−34.6%
2020	37		−30.2%
U.S. Decennial Census

=== 2010 census ===
As of the census of 2010, there were 53 people, 23 households, and 16 families residing in the city. The population density was 378.6 inhabitants per square mile (146.2/km^{2}). There were 48 housing units at an average density of 342.9 per square mile (132.4/km^{2}). The racial makeup of the city was 100.0% White.

There were 23 households, of which 21.7% had children under the age of 18 living with them, 65.2% were married couples living together, 4.3% had a male householder with no wife present, and 30.4% were non-families. 30.4% of all households were made up of individuals, and 17.4% had someone living alone who was 65 years of age or older. The average household size was 2.30 and the average family size was 2.75.

The median age in the city was 48.5 years. 17% of residents were under the age of 18; 15.1% were between the ages of 18 and 24; 9.5% were from 25 to 44; 39.6% were from 45 to 64; and 18.9% were 65 years of age or older. The gender makeup of the city was 50.9% male and 49.1% female.

=== 2000 census ===
As of the census of 2000, there were 81 people, 33 households, and 22 families residing in the city. The population density was 538.8 inhabitants per square mile (208.0/km^{2}). There were 50 housing units at an average density of 332.6 per square mile (128.4/km^{2}). The racial makeup of the city was 97.53% White, 2.47% from other races. Hispanic or Latino of any race were 2.47% of the population.

There were 33 households, out of which 27.3% had children under the age of 18 living with them, 57.6% were married couples living together, 9.1% had a female householder with no husband present, and 33.3% were non-families. 33.3% of all households were made up of individuals, and 12.1% had someone living alone who was 65 years of age or older. The average household size was 2.45 and the average family size was 3.09.

In the city, the population was spread out, with 25.9% under the age of 18, 9.9% from 18 to 24, 19.8% from 25 to 44, 29.6% from 45 to 64, and 14.8% who were 65 years of age or older. The median age was 41 years. For every 100 females, there were 80.0 males. For every 100 females age 18 and over, there were 87.5 males.

The median income for a household in the city was $20,625, and the median income for a family was $37,083. Males had a median income of $29,063 versus $17,500 for females. The per capita income for the city was $15,059. There were 26.3% of families and 28.4% of the population living below the poverty line, including 63.6% of under eighteens and none of those over 64.

== External list ==
- Sun City - Directory of Public Officials
- USD 254, local school district
- Sun City History from Barber County, Kansas: History and Genealogy.
- "Work Of The Storm Fiend: Sun City Swept by a Cyclone." "Medicine Lodge Cresset", April 26, 1883.
- "Shooting Affray At Sun City" "The Medicine Lodge Cresset", November 19, 1880.
