= Barber County, Kansas =

County in Kansas, United States

- County
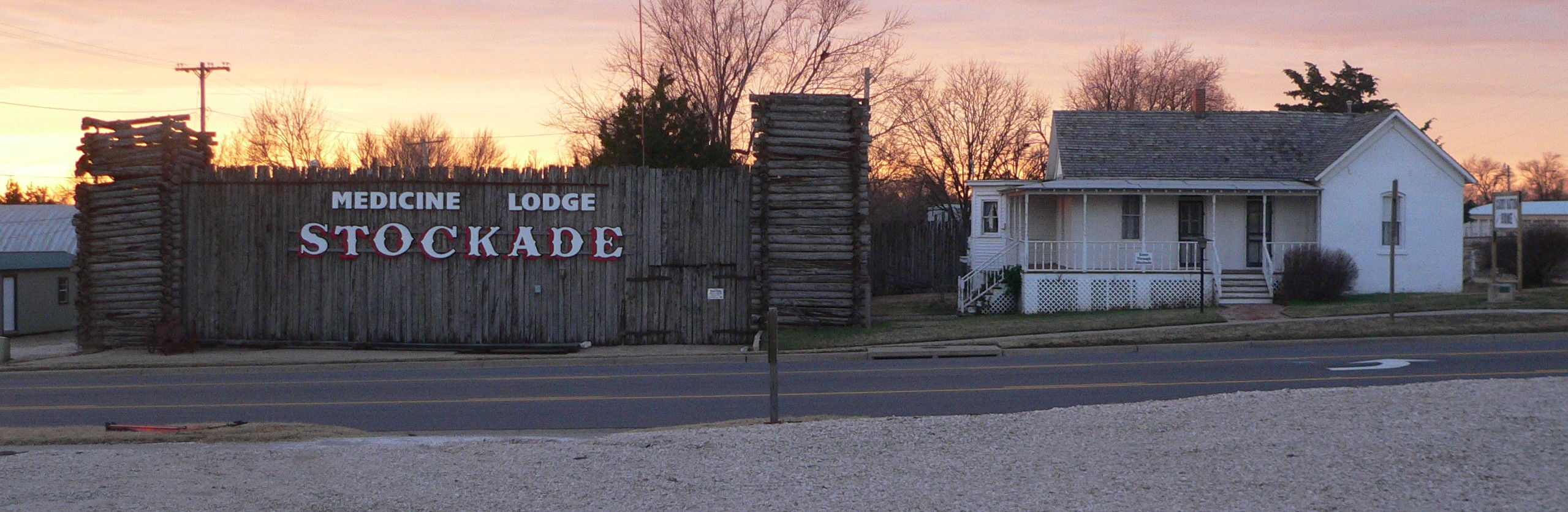
- Medicine Lodge Stockade Museum (left) and Carrie A. Nation house (right) in Medicine Lodge

- Location within the U.S. state of Kansas
- Coordinates: 37°14′N 98°41′W
- Country: United States
- State: Kansas
- Founded: February 26, 1867
- Named for: Thomas W. Barber
- Seat: Medicine Lodge
- Largest city: Medicine Lodge

Area
  - Total: 1,136 sq mi (2,940 km^{2})
  - Land: 1,134 sq mi (2,940 km^{2})
  - Water: 2.1 sq mi (5.4 km^{2}) 0.2%

Population (2020)
  - Total: 4,228
  - Estimate (2025): 4,083 ▼
  - Density: 3.728/sq mi (1.440/km^{2})
- Time zone: UTC−6 (Central)
  - Summer (DST): UTC−5 (CDT)
- Area code: 620
- Congressional district: 4th
- Website: barber.ks.gov

Barber County is a county located in the south-central portion of the U.S. state of Kansas. Its county seat and most populous city is Medicine Lodge. As of the 2020 census, the county population was 4,228. The county was named for Thomas Barber, an abolitionist who was killed in Douglas County in 1855 during the Wakarusa War.

== History ==
Barber County was formed in 1867 from parts of Washington County, Peketon County, and Marion County. Organized in 1873, it was named after Thomas Barber, a free-state man killed during Bleeding Kansas. The county's name was initially misspelled as “Barbour” before being officially changed to “Barber.”

The land that would become Barber County was formerly part of the "thirty mile" and "three mile" strips, previously owned by the Osages and the Cherokees respectively. These lands were ceded to the United States Government by the treaty of July 15, 1870, and were then offered for pre-emption, but not for homesteading or timber claim entry. Early settlers noted the numerous buffalo wallows in the county.

The first settler in the county, a man named Griffin, settled in the winter of 1871-72 near Sun City. Indians opposed to white settlement soon brought conflict, including an 1872 raid resulting in the death of trader E. H. Mosely. Defensive stockades were subsequently erected in Medicine Lodge and Sun City.

Settlements such as Kiowa and Medicine Lodge were established, with rapid settlement occurring in the summer of 1873. Notable events included the county's first child born in 1873 and its first wedding in 1874.

In the summer of 1874, an Indian raid resulted in the murder of several settlers along the Medicine Lodge River. Various accounts attribute the raid to Indian opposition to white settlement or the actions of disguised white assailants aiming to cover up their illegal activities in the county. To protect citizens, stockades were built, and militia groups were organized in Medicine Lodge and Sun City.

Buffalo once roamed abundantly in the county, but by the 1880s, their numbers had significantly diminished. Their former habitat, however, made excellent range for cattle, and in 1870, Barber and Comanche county ranchers formed a cooperative known as the Comanche cattle pool. The discovery of gypsum deposits along the Medicine Lodge River led to the establishment of a plaster company in Sun City in 1891.

The Medicine Lodge Bank was robbed in 1884 by a gang led by Henry Newton Brown, the marshal of Caldwell in nearby Sumner County. The bandits were pursued, captured, and thrown in jail. That night, a mob overpowered the Medicine Lodge sheriff, shot and killed Brown, and hanged the other men from a tree.

Temperance advocate Carrie Nation smashed her first saloon in Kiowa, Kansas in 1900. Today, her former residence is a National Historic Landmark.

== Geography ==
According to the U.S. Census Bureau, the county has a total area of 1,136 square miles (2,940 km^{2}), of which 1,134 square miles (2,940 km^{2}) is land and 2.1 square miles (5.4 km^{2}) (0.2%) is water.

The Medicine Lodge River flows through the county.

=== Adjacent counties ===
- Pratt County (north)
- Kingman County (northeast)
- Harper County (east)
- Alfalfa County, Oklahoma (southeast)
- Woods County, Oklahoma (southwest)
- Comanche County (west)
- Kiowa County (northwest)

=== Major highways ===
Sources: National Atlas, U.S. Census Bureau

- US-160
- US-281
- K-2

== Demographics ==
Historical population
Census	Pop.	Note	%±
1880	2,661		—
1890	7,973		199.6%
1900	6,594		−17.3%
1910	9,916		50.4%
1920	9,739		−1.8%
1930	10,178		4.5%
1940	9,073		−10.9%
1950	8,521		−6.1%
1960	8,713		2.3%
1970	7,016		−19.5%
1980	6,548		−6.7%
1990	5,874		−10.3%
2000	5,307		−9.7%
2010	4,861		−8.4%
2020	4,228		−13.0%
2025 (est.)	4,083	▼	−3.4%
U.S. Decennial Census; 1790-1960 1900-1990; 1990-2000 2010-2020

=== Racial and ethnic composition ===
Barber County, Kansas – Racial and ethnic composition Note: the US Census treats Hispanic/Latino as an ethnic category. This table excludes Latinos from the racial categories and assigns them to a separate category. Hispanics/Latinos may be of any race.
Race / Ethnicity (NH = Non-Hispanic)	Pop 1980	Pop 1990	Pop 2000	Pop 2010	Pop 2020	% 1980	% 1990	% 2000	% 2010	% 2020
White alone (NH)	6,434	5,755	5,105	4,608	3,814	98.26%	97.97%	96.19%	94.80%	90.21%
Black or African American alone (NH)	10	13	16	20	7	0.15%	0.22%	0.30%	0.41%	0.17%
Native American or Alaska Native alone (NH)	26	28	30	24	34	0.40%	0.48%	0.57%	0.49%	0.80%
Asian alone (NH)	10	3	5	20	16	0.15%	0.05%	0.09%	0.41%	0.38%
Native Hawaiian or Pacific Islander alone (NH)	x	x	0	0	5	x	x	0.00%	0.00%	0.12%
Other race alone (NH)	1	2	0	13	11	0.02%	0.03%	0.00%	0.27%	0.26%
Mixed race or Multiracial (NH)	x	x	44	57	179	x	x	0.83%	1.17%	4.23%
Hispanic or Latino (any race)	67	73	107	119	162	1.02%	1.24%	2.02%	2.45%	3.83%
Total	6,548	5,874	5,307	4,861	4,228	100.00%	100.00%	100.00%	100.00%	100.00%

=== 2020 census ===
As of the 2020 census, the county had a population of 4,228. The median age was 46.4 years. 22.1% of residents were under the age of 18 and 25.4% of residents were 65 years of age or older. For every 100 females there were 103.2 males, and for every 100 females age 18 and over there were 101.0 males age 18 and over. 0.0% of residents lived in urban areas, while 100.0% lived in rural areas.

The racial makeup of the county was 91.2% White, 0.2% Black or African American, 0.8% American Indian and Alaska Native, 0.4% Asian, 0.1% Native Hawaiian and Pacific Islander, 2.2% from some other race, and 5.1% from two or more races. Hispanic or Latino residents of any race comprised 3.8% of the population.

There were 1,916 households in the county, of which 24.4% had children under the age of 18 living with them and 22.9% had a female householder with no spouse or partner present. About 34.3% of all households were made up of individuals and 17.9% had someone living alone who was 65 years of age or older.

There were 2,574 housing units, of which 25.6% were vacant. Among occupied housing units, 76.2% were owner-occupied and 23.8% were renter-occupied. The homeowner vacancy rate was 2.1% and the rental vacancy rate was 20.7%.

=== 2000 census ===
As of the 2000 census, there were 5,307 people, 2,235 households, and 1,510 families residing in the county. The population density was 5 people per square mile (1.9 people/km^{2}). There were 2,740 housing units at an average density of 2 per square mile (0.77/km^{2}). The racial makeup of the county was 97.06% White, 0.38% Black or African American, 0.58% Native American, 0.09% Asian, 0.89% from other races, and 1.00% from two or more races. Hispanic or Latino of any race were 2.02% of the population.

There were 2,235 households, out of which 28.70% had children under the age of 18 living with them, 58.70% were married couples living together, 6.50% had a female householder with no husband present, and 32.40% were non-families. 29.90% of all households were made up of individuals, and 17.00% had someone living alone who was 65 years of age or older. The average household size was 2.35 and the average family size was 2.91.

In the county, the population was spread out, with 25.00% under the age of 18, 5.80% from 18 to 24, 23.20% from 25 to 44, 24.50% from 45 to 64, and 21.50% who were 65 years of age or older. The median age was 43 years. For every 100 females there were 92.40 males. For every 100 females age 18 and over, there were 89.40 males.

The median income for a household in the county was $33,407, and the median income for a family was $40,234. Males had a median income of $29,806 versus $20,046 for females. The per capita income for the county was $16,627. About 7.50% of families and 10.10% of the population were below the poverty line, including 12.60% of those under age 18 and 4.90% of those age 65 or over.

== Government ==
Barber County is, in common with other rural Kansas counties, a Republican stronghold. The last Democrat to carry this county was Lyndon B. Johnson in 1964.

=== Presidential elections ===
Presidential election results

United States presidential election results for Barber County, Kansas
Year	Republican		Democratic		Third party(ies)	
Year	No.	%	No.	%	No.	%
1888	977	48.80%	710	35.46%	315	15.73%
1892	883	37.75%	0	0.00%	1,456	62.25%
1896	597	44.45%	729	54.28%	17	1.27%
1900	862	51.16%	783	46.47%	40	2.37%
1904	967	58.29%	566	34.12%	126	7.59%
1908	1,097	53.72%	864	42.31%	81	3.97%
1912	295	12.73%	883	38.11%	1,139	49.16%
1916	1,632	40.97%	2,061	51.74%	290	7.28%
1920	2,400	66.45%	1,098	30.40%	114	3.16%
1924	2,218	58.25%	909	23.87%	681	17.88%
1928	2,984	76.43%	871	22.31%	49	1.26%
1932	1,671	40.88%	2,321	56.78%	96	2.35%
1936	1,816	39.41%	2,774	60.20%	18	0.39%
1940	2,389	52.84%	2,074	45.87%	58	1.28%
1944	2,140	58.28%	1,501	40.88%	31	0.84%
1948	2,013	50.92%	1,891	47.84%	49	1.24%
1952	3,071	74.09%	1,028	24.80%	46	1.11%
1956	2,698	68.32%	1,241	31.43%	10	0.25%
1960	2,703	66.48%	1,347	33.13%	16	0.39%
1964	1,758	48.51%	1,845	50.91%	21	0.58%
1968	2,023	60.55%	1,027	30.74%	291	8.71%
1972	2,308	74.26%	727	23.39%	73	2.35%
1976	1,568	50.43%	1,494	48.05%	47	1.51%
1980	1,872	62.53%	914	30.53%	208	6.95%
1984	2,112	71.84%	806	27.41%	22	0.75%
1988	1,539	56.87%	1,118	41.32%	49	1.81%
1992	1,225	42.52%	759	26.35%	897	31.14%
1996	1,696	62.15%	730	26.75%	303	11.10%
2000	1,755	70.26%	637	25.50%	106	4.24%
2004	1,782	74.16%	588	24.47%	33	1.37%
2008	1,833	74.45%	598	24.29%	31	1.26%
2012	1,772	76.58%	482	20.83%	60	2.59%
2016	1,850	82.15%	286	12.70%	116	5.15%
2020	2,014	85.99%	291	12.43%	37	1.58%
2024	1,854	85.44%	288	13.27%	28	1.29%

=== Laws ===
Barber County allows the sale of liquor at not only liquor stores but also in restaurants.

=== Barber County Sheriff's Office ===
The Barber County Sheriff's Office provides law enforcement in the county. As of 2024, one officer of the Barber County Sheriff's Office has been killed in the line of duty.

== Economy ==
RSI Corporation

== Education ==
=== Unified school districts ===
School districts include:

- Barber County North USD 254 - Medicine Lodge
- South Barber USD 255 - Kiowa

School districts with headquarter in neighboring county

- Skyline USD 438 - west of Pratt

== Communities ==
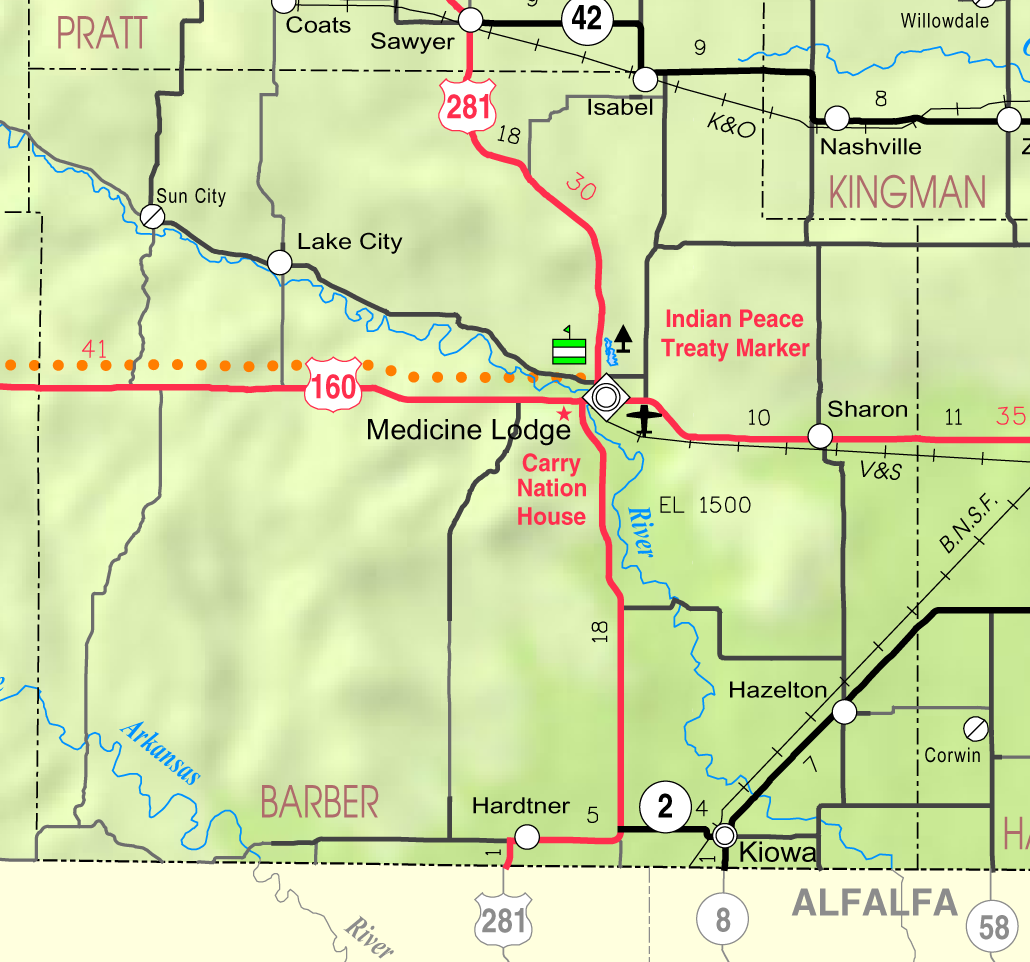
2005 map of Barber County (legend)

List of townships / incorporated cities / unincorporated communities / extinct former communities within Barber County.

=== Cities ===
- Hardtner
- Hazelton
- Isabel
- Kiowa
- Medicine Lodge (county seat)
- Sharon
- Sun City

=== Census designated place (CDP) ===
- Lake City

=== Unincorporated communities ===
- Aetna
- Deerhead
- Eldred
- Elm Mills
- Forest City
- Gerlane
- Mingona
- Pixley
- Stubbs

=== Ghost towns ===
- Lasswell
- Mingona
- Pixley

=== Townships ===
Barber County is divided into eighteen townships. None of the cities within the county are considered governmentally independent, and all figures for the townships include those of the cities. In the following table, the population center is the largest city (or cities) included in that township's population total, if it is of a significant size.

Township	FIPS	Population center	Population	Population density /km^{2} (/sq mi)	Land area km^{2} (sq mi)	Water area km^{2} (sq mi)	Water %	Geographic coordinates
Aetna	00400		3	0 (0)	318 (123)	0 (0)	0.13%	37°5′37″N 98°56′43″W
Deerhead	17300		11	0 (0)	165 (64)	0 (0)	0.07%	37°13′59″N 98°58′3″W
Eagle	19150		42	0 (0)	290 (112)	0 (0)	0.04%	37°10′13″N 98°46′22″W
Elm Mills	20800		106	1 (2)	155 (60)	1 (0)	0.35%	37°25′37″N 98°38′45″W
Elwood	20925	Hardtner	275	1 (3)	260 (100)	0 (0)	0.18%	37°2′30″N 98°40′35″W
Hazelton	31175	Hazelton	213	1 (3)	189 (73)	1 (0)	0.33%	37°6′7″N 98°24′1″W
Kiowa	37150	Kiowa	1,164	9 (24)	124 (48)	0 (0)	0.31%	37°1′3″N 98°29′19″W
Lake City	37900		83	1 (2)	109 (42)	0 (0)	0.20%	37°21′11″N 98°49′2″W
McAdoo	43550		29	0 (1)	93 (36)	0 (0)	0.36%	37°26′16″N 98°49′31″W
Medicine Lodge	45525	Medicine Lodge	2,573	8 (22)	309 (119)	1 (0)	0.33%	37°17′17″N 98°34′5″W
Mingona	47050		57	0 (1)	139 (54)	0 (0)	0.10%	37°17′39″N 98°40′37″W
Moore	48075		32	0 (1)	119 (46)	0 (0)	0.24%	37°4′9″N 98°32′59″W
Nippawalla	50775		26	0 (0)	140 (54)	0 (0)	0.26%	37°9′56″N 98°32′5″W
Ridge (defunct, merged with Sharon)	59775		4	0 (0)	93 (36)	0 (0)	0.12%	37°22′37″N 98°25′7″W
Sharon	64350	Sharon	369	4 (10)	95 (37)	0 (0)	0.04%	37°14′56″N 98°24′32″W
Sun City	69300	Sun City	100	1 (2)	124 (48)	0 (0)	0.09%	37°22′39″N 98°55′13″W
Turkey Creek	71675		37	0 (1)	123 (47)	0 (0)	0.12%	37°26′6″N 98°55′0″W
Valley	72750	Isabel	183	2 (5)	94 (36)	0 (0)	0.01%	37°26′6″N 98°31′44″W
Sources: "Census 2000 U.S. Gazetteer Files". U.S. Census Bureau, Geography Division. Archived from the original on August 2, 2002.

== See also ==
- National Register of Historic Places listings in Barber County, Kansas

Community information for Kansas

- Kansas locations by per capita income
- List of counties in Kansas
- List of townships in Kansas
- List of cities in Kansas
- List of unincorporated communities in Kansas
- List of ghost towns in Kansas
