= Deerhead Township, Kansas =

Deerhead Township
- Township
- Location in Barber County
- Coordinates: 37°13′20″N 098°56′20″W
- Country: United States
- State: Kansas
- County: Barber

Area
  - Total: 63.60 sq mi (164.73 km^{2})
  - Land: 63.56 sq mi (164.62 km^{2})
  - Water: 0.042 sq mi (0.11 km^{2}) 0.07%
- Elevation: 1,906 ft (581 m)

Population (2000)
  - Total: 11
  - Density: 0.26/sq mi (0.1/km^{2})
- GNIS ID: 0470477

Deerhead Township is a township in Barber County, Kansas, United States. As of the 2000 census, its population was 11.

== Geography ==
Deerhead Township covers an area of 63.6 square miles (165 km^{2}) and contains no incorporated settlements.

The stream of Inman Creek runs through this township.

== Demographics ==
The most common first ancestry reported in Deerhead township is German.
