= Valley Township, Barber County, Kansas =

Valley Township Barber County, Kansas
- Township
- Location in Barber County
- Coordinates: 37°25′45″N 098°31′16″W
- Country: United States
- State: Kansas
- County: Barber

Area
  - Total: 36.17 sq mi (93.69 km^{2})
  - Land: 36.17 sq mi (93.67 km^{2})
  - Water: 0.0039 sq mi (0.01 km^{2}) 0.01%
- Elevation: 1,814 ft (553 m)

Population (2020)
  - Total: 131
  - Density: 3.62/sq mi (1.40/km^{2})
- GNIS feature ID: 0470388

Valley Township is a township in Barber County, Kansas, United States. As of the 2020 census, its population was 131.

== Geography ==
Valley Township covers an area of 36.17 square miles (93.7 km^{2}) and contains one incorporated settlement, Isabel.

The stream of Chicken Creek runs through this township.

== Transportation ==
Valley Township contains one airport or landing strip, Van Rankin Landing Strip.
