= Medicine Lodge Township, Kansas =

Medicine Lodge Township
- Township
- Location in Barber County
- Coordinates: 37°18′50″N 098°33′56″W
- Country: United States
- State: Kansas
- County: Barber

Area
  - Total: 119.75 sq mi (310.15 km^{2})
  - Land: 119.36 sq mi (309.13 km^{2})
  - Water: 0.39 sq mi (1.01 km^{2}) 0.33%
- Elevation: 1,512 ft (461 m)

Population (2000)
  - Total: 2,573
  - Density: 21/sq mi (8.3/km^{2})
- ZIP Codes: 67104
- GNIS feature ID: 0470490

Medicine Lodge Township is a township in Barber County, Kansas, United States. As of the 2000 census, its population was 2,573.

== Geography ==
Medicine Lodge Township covers an area of 119.75 square miles (310.2 km^{2}) and contains one incorporated settlement, Medicine Lodge (the county seat). According to the USGS, it contains one cemetery, Highland.

The streams of Albee Creek, Amber Creek, Antelope Creek, Cedar Creek, Elm Creek, Hackberry Creek, Short Creek, Threemile Creek, Walnut Creek and West Branch Little Sandy Creek run through this township.

== Transportation ==
Medicine Lodge Township contains one airport or landing strip, Medicine Lodge Airport.
