= Kiowa, Kansas =

City in Kiowa County, Kansas

- City
- Seal

- Location within Barber County and Kansas

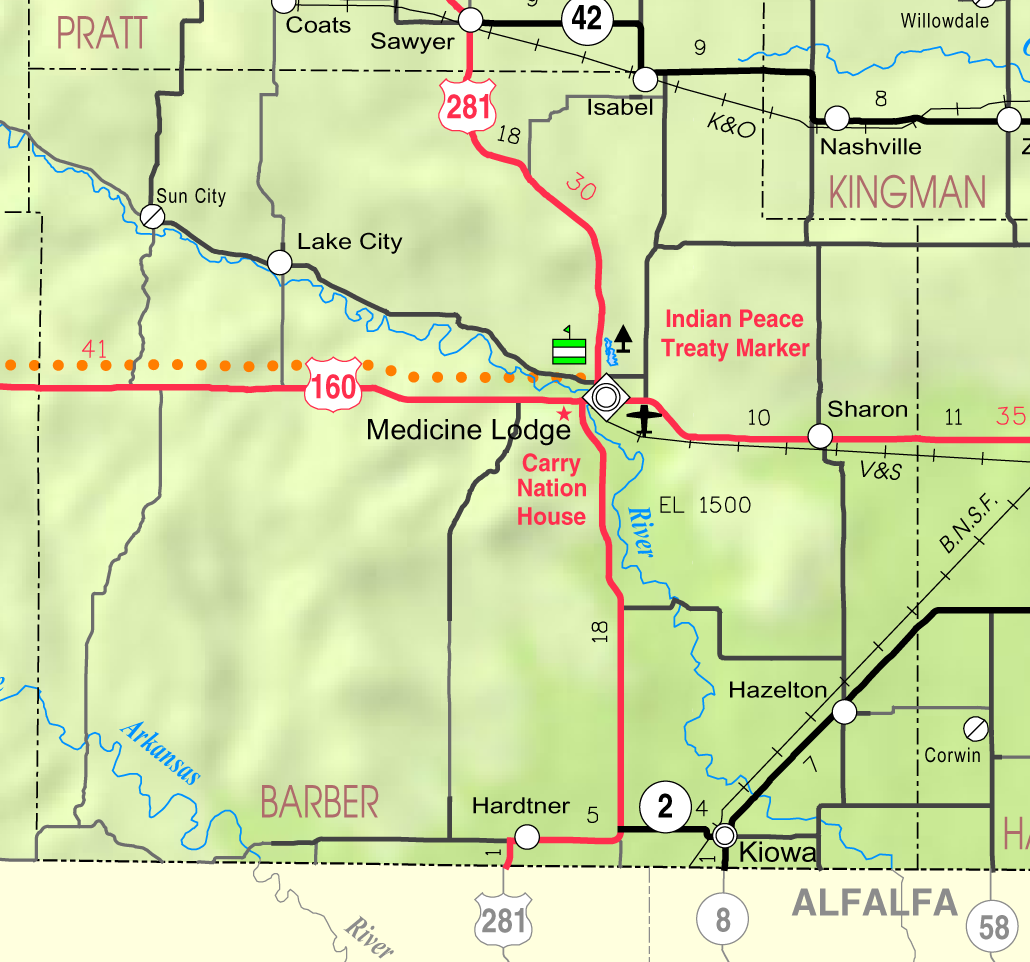
- KDOT map of Barber County (legend)
- Coordinates: 37°01′03″N 98°29′05″W
- Country: United States
- State: Kansas
- County: Barber
- Township: Kiowa
- Founded: 1872
- Incorporated: 1885
- Named for: Kiowa people

Government
  - Type: Mayor–Council
  - Mayor: Bill Watson

Area
  - Total: 1.11 sq mi (2.87 km^{2})
  - Land: 1.11 sq mi (2.87 km^{2})
  - Water: 0 sq mi (0.00 km^{2})
- Elevation: 1,332 ft (406 m)

Population (2020)
  - Total: 902
  - Density: 814/sq mi (314/km^{2})
- Time zone: UTC-6 (CST)
  - Summer (DST): UTC-5 (CDT)
- ZIP Code: 67070
- Area code: 620
- FIPS code: 20-37125
- GNIS ID: 2395545
- Website: kiowaks.org

Kiowa is a city in Kiowa Township, Barber County, Kansas, United States. As of the 2020 census, the population of the city was 902. It is located one mile north of the Kansas / Oklahoma state border.

== History ==
=== 19th century ===
Kiowa was founded in 1872. It was named for the Kiowa people.

=== 20th century ===
On June 7, 1900, anti-saloon advocate Carrie Nation vandalized her first saloon in Kiowa. In 1910, Kiowa became a sundown town, having a sign at each of four roads into the city that read, "Niggers Read and Run", and Black residents were given 24 hours to leave town.

In 1905, the Denver, Enid and Gulf Railroad was built from Enid, Oklahoma, to Kiowa. In 1907, it was sold to the Atchison, Topeka and Santa Fe Railway. In 1996, the line from Kiowa to Blanton, Oklahoma, was abandoned.

== Geography ==
According to the United States Census Bureau, the city has a total area of 1.07 square miles (2.77 km^{2}), all land.

== Demographics ==
Historical population
Census	Pop.	Note	%±
1880	42		—
1890	893		2,026.2%
1900	765		−14.3%
1910	1,520		98.7%
1920	1,539		1.3%
1930	1,501		−2.5%
1940	1,379		−8.1%
1950	1,561		13.2%
1960	1,674		7.2%
1970	1,414		−15.5%
1980	1,409		−0.4%
1990	1,160		−17.7%
2000	1,055		−9.1%
2010	1,026		−2.7%
2020	902		−12.1%
U.S. Decennial Census

=== 2020 census ===
The 2020 United States census counted 902 people, 404 households, and 230 families in Kiowa. The population density was 814.1 per square mile (314.3/km^{2}). There were 552 housing units at an average density of 498.2 per square mile (192.4/km^{2}). The racial makeup was 90.8% (819) white or European American (90.02% non-Hispanic white), 0.0% (0) black or African-American, 0.44% (4) Native American or Alaska Native, 0.44% (4) Asian, 0.44% (4) Pacific Islander or Native Hawaiian, 1.88% (17) from other races, and 5.99% (54) from two or more races. Hispanic or Latino of any race was 3.33% (30) of the population.

Of the 404 households, 23.3% had children under the age of 18; 43.1% were married couples living together; 27.0% had a female householder with no spouse or partner present. 37.6% of households consisted of individuals and 17.8% had someone living alone who was 65 years of age or older. The average household size was 2.2 and the average family size was 2.5. The percent of those with a bachelor's degree or higher was estimated to be 16.7% of the population.

22.5% of the population was under the age of 18, 5.4% from 18 to 24, 22.7% from 25 to 44, 23.1% from 45 to 64, and 26.3% who were 65 years of age or older. The median age was 43.9 years. For every 100 females, there were 99.6 males. For every 100 females ages 18 and older, there were 103.2 males.

The 2016–2020 5-year American Community Survey estimates show that the median household income was $51,667 (with a margin of error of +/- $11,439) and the median family income was $65,042 (+/- $7,840). Males had a median income of $30,938 (+/- $10,887) versus $14,441 (+/- $5,956) for females. The median income for those above 16 years old was $24,571 (+/- $1,954). Approximately, 6.8% of families and 10.9% of the population were below the poverty line, including 6.1% of those under the age of 18 and 7.6% of those ages 65 or over.

=== 2010 census ===
As of the census of 2010, there were 1,026 people, 466 households, and 273 families living in the city. The population density was 958.9 inhabitants per square mile (370.2/km^{2}). There were 578 housing units at an average density of 540.2 per square mile (208.6/km^{2}). The racial makeup of the city was 95.3% White, 0.2% African American, 1.2% Native American, 0.2% Asian, 1.8% from other races, and 1.4% from two or more races. Hispanic or Latino of any race were 4.1% of the population.

There were 466 households, of which 24.5% had children under the age of 18 living with them, 48.1% were married couples living together, 6.9% had a female householder with no husband present, 3.6% had a male householder with no wife present, and 41.4% were non-families. 36.5% of all households were made up of individuals, and 19.3% had someone living alone who was 65 years of age or older. The average household size was 2.14 and the average family size was 2.79.

The median age in the city was 46.9 years. 21.8% of residents were under the age of 18; 7.6% were between the ages of 18 and 24; 18.5% were from 25 to 44; 28.5% were from 45 to 64; and 23.7% were 65 years of age or older. The gender makeup of the city was 49.0% male and 51.0% female.

== Education ==
The community is served by South Barber USD 255 public school district.

The Kiowa Chieftains won the Kansas State High School class B Track & Field championship in 1940.

== Media ==
Kiowa is served by a weekly newspaper, The Kiowa News.

== Infrastructure ==
K-2 and K-8 highways, and the Southern Transcon main line of BNSF Railway pass through Kiowa.

A public FAA inspected Airport that serves the area is located, 4 miles Northwest of Kiowa, FAA number, 4KS Walz Airport

== Notable people ==
- Marcellus Boss, the fifth Civilian Governor of Guam; former Kiowa city attorney.
- Charles E. Brown, Jr., Chief of Chaplains of the U.S. Army.
- Bill Tidwell, four-time NAIA middle distance champion at Kansas State Teachers College (ESU), then coach and athletic director
- James Wilson, former Colorado State Representative

== See also ==
- List of sundown towns in the United States
- RSI Corporation
