= Moore Township, Barber County, Kansas =

Moore Township
- Township
- Location in Barber County
- Coordinates: 37°05′16″N 098°33′09″W
- Country: United States
- State: Kansas
- County: Barber

Area
  - Total: 45.93 sq mi (118.97 km^{2})
  - Land: 45.82 sq mi (118.68 km^{2})
  - Water: 0.11 sq mi (0.29 km^{2}) 0.24%
- Elevation: 1,410 ft (430 m)

Population (2000)
  - Total: 32
  - Density: 0.78/sq mi (0.3/km^{2})
- GNIS feature ID: 0470543

Moore Township is a township in Barber County, Kansas, United States. As of the 2000 census, its population was 32.

== Geography ==
Moore Township covers an area of 45.93 square miles (119.0 km^{2}) and contains no incorporated settlements.
