= Mingona Township, Kansas =

Mingona Township
- Township
- Location in Barber County
- Coordinates: 37°19′00″N 098°42′01″W
- Country: United States
- State: Kansas
- County: Barber

Area
  - Total: 53.56 sq mi (138.71 km^{2})
  - Land: 53.50 sq mi (138.57 km^{2})
  - Water: 0.054 sq mi (0.14 km^{2}) 0.1%
- Elevation: 1,526 ft (465 m)

Population (2000)
  - Total: 57
  - Density: 1.0/sq mi (0.4/km^{2})
- GNIS feature ID: 0470439

Mingona Township is a township in Barber County, Kansas, United States. As of the 2000 census, its population was 57.

== Geography ==
Mingona Township covers an area of 53.56 square miles (138.7 km^{2}) and contains no incorporated settlements.

The stream of Bitter Creek runs through this township.
