= McAdoo Township, Kansas =

McAdoo Township
- Township
- Location in Barber County
- Coordinates: 37°25′40″N 098°48′41″W
- Country: United States
- State: Kansas
- County: Barber

Area
  - Total: 35.97 sq mi (93.17 km^{2})
  - Land: 35.84 sq mi (92.83 km^{2})
  - Water: 0.13 sq mi (0.33 km^{2}) 0.35%
- Elevation: 1,877 ft (572 m)

Population (2000)
  - Total: 29
  - Density: 0.78/sq mi (0.3/km^{2})
- GNIS feature ID: 0470372

McAdoo Township is a township in Barber County, Kansas, United States. As of the 2000 census, its population was 29.

== History ==
McAdoo Township was named for the McAdoo family of pioneer settlers.

== Geography ==
McAdoo Township covers an area of 35.97 square miles (93.2 km^{2}) and contains no incorporated settlements.

The streams of East Branch South Elm Creek and West Branch South Elm Creek run through this township.
