= Elm Mills Township, Kansas =

Elm Mills Township
- Township
- Location in Barber County
- Coordinates: 37°25′45″N 098°40′01″W
- Country: United States
- State: Kansas
- County: Barber

Area
  - Total: 59.88 sq mi (155.09 km^{2})
  - Land: 59.67 sq mi (154.54 km^{2})
  - Water: 0.21 sq mi (0.55 km^{2}) 0.35%
- Elevation: 1,762 ft (537 m)

Population (2000)
  - Total: 106
  - Density: 1.8/sq mi (0.7/km^{2})
- GNIS feature ID: 0470380

Elm Mills Township is a township in Barber County, Kansas, United States. As of the 2000 census, its population was 106.

== Geography ==
Elm Mills Township covers an area of 59.88 square miles (155.1 km^{2}) and contains no incorporated settlements. According to the USGS, it contains one cemetery, Isabel.

The streams of Crooked Creek, North Elm Creek and South Elm Creek run through this township.
