= Turkey Creek Township, Barber County, Kansas =

Turkey Creek Township
- Township
- Location in Barber County
- Coordinates: 37°25′34″N 098°56′11″W
- Country: United States
- State: Kansas
- County: Barber

Area
  - Total: 47 sq mi (123 km^{2})
  - Land: 47.44 sq mi (122.86 km^{2})
  - Water: 0.054 sq mi (0.14 km^{2}) 0.11%
- Elevation: 1,841 ft (561 m)

Population (2000)
  - Total: 37
  - Density: 0.78/sq mi (0.3/km^{2})
- GNIS feature ID: 0470370

Turkey Creek Township is a township in Barber County, Kansas, United States. As of the 2000 census, its population was 37.

== Geography ==
Turkey Creek Township covers an area of 47.49 square miles (123.0 km^{2}) and contains no incorporated settlements. According to the USGS, it contains one cemetery, Chinn.
