= Kiowa Township, Kansas =

Kiowa Township
- Township
- Location in Barber County
- Coordinates: 37°01′06″N 098°26′16″W
- Country: United States
- State: Kansas
- County: Barber

Area
  - Total: 48.00 sq mi (124.32 km^{2})
  - Land: 47.85 sq mi (123.93 km^{2})
  - Water: 0.15 sq mi (0.39 km^{2}) 0.31%
- Elevation: 1,296 ft (395 m)

Population (2000)
  - Total: 1,164
  - Density: 24/sq mi (9.4/km^{2})
- GNIS feature ID: 0470549

Kiowa Township is a township in Barber County, Kansas, United States. As of the 2000 census, its population was 1,164.

== Geography ==
Kiowa Township covers an area of 48 square miles (120 km^{2}) and contains one incorporated settlement, Kiowa. According to the USGS, it contains one cemetery, Riverview.

== Transportation ==
Kiowa Township contains one airport or landing strip, Kiowa Airport. Kiowa Airport is closed; it is on the west side of Kiowa. It has feed stacked on it. There are two grass private landing strips on the east side of Kiowa; one is one-half mile in length, while the other is one mile long. A public airport 4 miles Northwest exist 4KS Walz Airport.

U.S. Highway 281 and State Highway K2, runs through the township
