= Tornado outbreak of April 20–22, 1912 =

Tornado outbreak across the United States

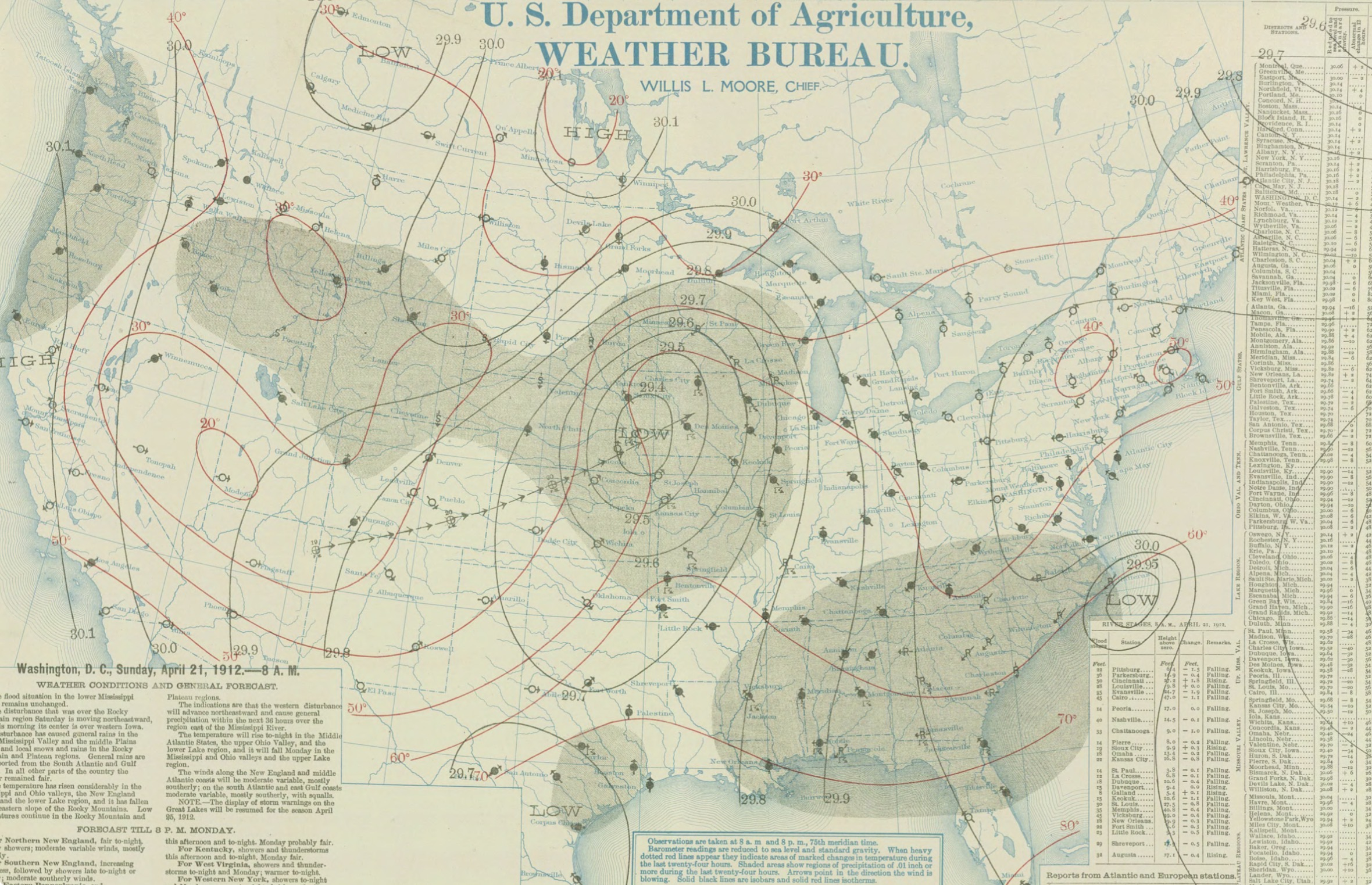
- Surface weather analysis on April 21, showing the low pressure area that would produce the tornado outbreak

Meteorological history
- Formed: April 20, 1912
- Dissipated: April 22, 1912

Tornado outbreak
- Tornadoes: ≥ 32
- Max. rating: F4 tornado
- Duration: ~2 days

Overall effects
- Fatalities: ≥ 56
- Injuries: ≥ 410
- Areas affected: Midwestern and Southern United States

On April 20 – 22, 1912, a large tornado outbreak affected portions of the High Plains, the Upper Midwest, and the Southern United States, including portions of what is now known as the Dallas–Fort Worth metroplex. The severe-weather event produced at least 32 tornadoes, at least nine—and possibly 10 or more—of which were violent tornadoes, all of which rated F4 on the Fujita scale. Powerful tornado activity was distributed from the Great Plains to South Carolina. The first day of the outbreak occurred on April 20 and produced numerous strong to violent tornadoes across parts of North Texas, Oklahoma, and Kansas. A second day of intense tornadoes occurred on April 21, with several strong to violent tornadoes across Illinois and Indiana. The final day, April 22, produced an F4 tornado in Georgia as well. The entire outbreak killed 56 people, and was followed days later by another intense tornado outbreak on April 27. That outbreak killed about 40 people, mostly in Oklahoma. Both outbreaks produced a combined total of nine F4 tornadoes in Oklahoma alone. (Note: An outbreak is generally defined as a group of at least six tornadoes (the number sometimes varies slightly according to local climatology) with no more than a six-hour gap between individual tornadoes. An outbreak sequence, prior to (after) the start of modern records in 1950, is defined as a period of no more than two (one) consecutive days without at least one significant (F2 or stronger) tornado.) (Note: The Fujita scale was devised under the aegis of scientist T. Theodore Fujita in the early 1970s. Prior to the advent of the scale in 1971, tornadoes in the United States were officially unrated. While the Fujita scale has been superseded by the Enhanced Fujita scale in the U.S. since February 1, 2007, Canada utilized the old scale until April 1, 2013; nations elsewhere, like the United Kingdom, apply other classifications such as the TORRO scale.) (Note: Historically, the number of tornadoes globally and in the United States was and is likely underrepresented: research by Grazulis on annual tornado activity suggests that, as of 2001, only 53% of yearly U.S. tornadoes were officially recorded. Documentation of tornadoes outside the United States was historically less exhaustive, owing to the lack of monitors in many nations and, in some cases, to internal political controls on public information. Most countries only recorded tornadoes that produced severe damage or loss of life. Significant low biases in U.S. tornado counts likely occurred through the early 1990s, when advanced NEXRAD was first installed and the National Weather Service began comprehensively verifying tornado occurrences.)

== Confirmed tornadoes ==
Confirmed tornadoes by Fujita rating
FU	F0	F1	F2	F3	F4	F5	Total
1	?	1	12	9	9	0	≥ 32

=== April 20, 1912 ===
Confirmed tornadoes – Saturday, April 20, 1912 (Note: All dates are based on the local time zone where the tornado touched down; however, all times are in Coordinated Universal Time and dates are split at midnight CST/CDT for consistency.) (Note: Prior to 1994, only the average widths of tornado paths were officially listed.)
F#	Location	County / Parish	State	Time (UTC)	Path length	Max. width	Summary
F3	Alvord to S of Rosston	Wise, Cooke	TX	21:00–?	22 miles (35 km)	150 yards (140 m)	First of four strong tornadoes to hit North Texas on April 20 destroyed or damaged 22 structures in Alvord, including a church and nine homes. Tornado then destroyed farms near Audubon and "Dan", scattering debris for miles around. 12 more barns and homes were destroyed near Rosston. 10 people were injured along the path.
F4	SE of Rush Center to Bison	Rush	KS	21:00–?	15 miles (24 km)	400 yards (370 m)	2 deaths – Intense tornado leveled entire farms near Rush Center, 12 of which were almost swept away. Debris was reported 8 mi (13 km) from the destroyed farms. Tornado also destroyed or damaged approximately 50 homes in Bison, or about half of the town, with losses estimated at $70,000. 15 people were injured along the path.
F4	W of Yukon to E of Edmond	Canadian, Oklahoma	OK	21:45–?	20 miles (32 km)	200 yards (180 m)	1 death – Tornado leveled a schoolhouse, along with at least a few farmhouses. Students departed from the school only 15 minutes before the tornado arrived. Tornado resembled a large elephant's trunk as it passed just 15 mi (24 km) northwest of Oklahoma City. One person was injured.
F3	E of Nashville to NE of Willowdale	Kingman	KS	21:45–?	15 miles (24 km)	100 yards (91 m)	Tornado injured four people, two each near both ends of its path.
F3	NW of Waldron	Harper	KS	22:00–?	7 miles (11 km)	200 yards (180 m)	1 death – Powerful, highly visible tornado leveled six farms and injured eight people. Tornado may have attained F4 intensity between Waldron and Corwin.
F3	NW of Arcadia to N of Fallis	Oklahoma, Logan, Lincoln	OK	22:20–?	15 miles (24 km)	300 yards (270 m)	Tornado destroyed at least six farmhouses.
F4	SW of Hennessey	Kingfisher	OK	22:30–?	12 miles (19 km)	800 yards (730 m)	2 deaths – Very intense tornado swept away farms and destroyed 15 homes, some of which it leveled, in and near Hennessey. Losses at Hennessey totaled approximately $100,000. Six injuries occurred along the path. Tornado may have reached F5 intensity.
F2	Northwestern Liberty Township to Eureka Township	Harper, Kingman	KS	23:00–?	25 miles (40 km)	Unknown	Tornado only destroyed a barn. The path extended past Nashville and Penalosa.
F4	SE of Perry to SW of Ralston	Noble, Pawnee	OK	23:30–?	30 miles (48 km)	800 yards (730 m)	3 deaths – Destructive tornado affected 25 farms and swept away 12 homes. 12 injuries were reported.
F3	NW of Orlando to Perry	Noble	OK	23:30–?	10 miles (16 km)	Unknown	Tornado injured 14 people and damaged or destroyed about 50 structures. One hotel in Perry lost its second story. Tornado ended as a downburst in Perry.
F3	S of Princeton to NE of Farmersville	Collin	TX	23:30–?	9 miles (14 km)	300 yards (270 m)	2 deaths – Tornado destroyed or damaged 26 homes. Two children died, one each in different farmhouses. Tornado briefly lifted over Farmersville, but touched down again northeast of town. Seven injuries were reported.
F4	S of Boonsville to Boyd	Wise	TX	00:00–?	15 miles (24 km)	300 yards (270 m)	4 deaths – Tornado destroyed at least 10 farms, many barns, and an iron bridge, scattering debris for miles. Only fragments remained of a home near Agnes. 10 people were injured.
F4	W of Roanoke to Flower Mound to S of Lewisville	Denton	TX	03:00–?	18 miles (29 km)	800 yards (730 m)	1 death – Massive, intense tornado swept away at least five farms. Hundreds of livestock were maimed or killed as well. 10 people were injured and losses totaled $60,000.
F1	Taylor	Williamson	TX	Unknown	Unknown	Unknown	1 death – Tornado destroyed frail structures, killing a man and injuring his wife.

=== April 21, 1912 ===
Confirmed tornadoes – Sunday, April 21, 1912
F#	Location	County / Parish	State	Time (UTC)	Path length	Max. width	Summary
F3	NE of Streator to N of Coal City	LaSalle, Grundy	IL	22:00–?	20 miles (32 km)	200 yards (180 m)	Tornado swept away two farmsteads near Kinsman and Verona. Most of the 37 injuries occurred in barns and losses totaled $100,000. Damage may have reached F4 intensity.
F2	Rowell to E of Clinton	DeWitt	IL	22:30–?	11 miles (18 km)	70 yards (64 m)	Tornado unroofed, destroyed, or otherwise damaged barns. 15 farms were impacted and one person was injured. Tornado passed within 1/2 mi (0.80 km) of a similar event on May 18, 1883.
F3	SW of Dwight to W of Kankakee	Livingston, Kankakee	IL	22:35–?	26 miles (42 km)	200 yards (180 m)	5 deaths – Farmhouses and other structures were destroyed near Reddick. 16 injuries occurred along the path.
F2	Southern Chatsworth	Livingston	IL	23:35–?	6 miles (9.7 km)	50 yards (46 m)	Short-lived tornado unroofed homes. 10 people were injured and losses totaled $40,000.
F2	Saint George, IL to W of Lowell, IN	Kankakee (IL), Lake (IN)	IL, IN	00:00–?	13 miles (21 km)	100 yards (91 m)	Tornado unroofed homes and destroyed a building in a brickyard at Grant Park, Illinois. Barns were leveled on six farms in Indiana. 20 people were injured and losses in Illinois totaled $100,000.
F4	N of Crescent City, IL to NE of Morocco, IN	Iroquois (IL), Newton (IN)	IL, IN	00:00–?	25 miles (40 km)	200 yards (180 m)	9 deaths – Tornado swept away farms near Pittwood and Donovan. The family of Sam Rice and their hired hand died on one of the farms. A wood stove was found 1/2 mi (0.80 km) away. 22 people were injured.
F4	N of Murphysboro to Bush to Pershing	Jackson, Williamson, Franklin	IL	00:05–?	20 miles (32 km)	400 yards (370 m)	11 deaths – Tornado roughly paralleled the 1925 Tri-State tornado. Tornado leveled farms near Murphysboro and Herrin and destroyed frail homes in Bush. 83 people were injured and losses totaled over $125,000. Tornado divided into several parts as it moved along—a possible reference to multiple vortices.
F2	S of Wellington	Iroquois	IL	01:00–?	10 miles (16 km)	70 yards (64 m)	Tornado unroofed homes. Five people were injured.
F3	NNW of Rensselaer	Jasper	IN	01:00–?	7 miles (11 km)	Unknown	1 death – Tornado destroyed a church, barns, and homes in Union Township. Four injuries occurred and losses totaled $25,000.
F2	Southeastern Willisville	Randolph, Perry	IL	01:10–?	8 miles (13 km)	70 yards (64 m)	3 deaths – Tornado destroyed or damaged 16 homes. 23 injuries were reported.
F2	S of Dale	Hamilton	IL	02:30–?	7 miles (11 km)	200 yards (180 m)	1 death – Homes shifted on their foundations or were unroofed. Eight injuries occurred.
FU	N of Murphysboro	Jackson	IL	Unknown	Unknown	Unknown	Tornado-generating storm hit 6 mi (9.7 km) north of Murphysboro. No details are available.

=== April 22, 1912 ===
Confirmed tornadoes – Monday, April 22, 1912
F#	Location	County / Parish	State	Time (UTC)	Path length	Max. width	Summary
F2	Sargent to NW of Madras	Coweta	GA	10:00–?	6 miles (9.7 km)	Unknown	1 death – Tornado destroyed three tenant homes near Newnan. Two people were injured.
F2	N of Hampton to McDonough	Henry	GA	12:00–?	7 miles (11 km)	200 yards (180 m)	Tornado unroofed large homes, destroyed small ones, and killed livestock near Locust Grove. Three injuries occurred.
F4	E of Stewart to Pitts Chapel	Jasper, Newton, Morgan	GA	12:30–?	20 miles (32 km)	800 yards (730 m)	6 deaths – Large, intense tornado swept away 12 homes, scattering debris for miles around. 20 people were injured.
F2	Southern Aiken	Aiken	SC	16:15–?	Unknown	300 yards (270 m)	Tornado unroofed many homes and other structures.
F2	Adamsville to Pinkney City to Brookside	Jefferson	AL	Unknown	10 miles (16 km)	Unknown	1 death – Tornado damaged or destroyed more than 100 homes. A live infant was found 1 mi (1.6 km) away. 50 people were injured.
F2	Waldron	Harper	KS	Unknown	Unknown	Unknown	1 death – Tornado destroyed homes. Eight people were injured.

== See also ==
- Tornadoes in Oklahoma
- List of North American tornadoes and tornado outbreaks
- Tornado outbreak of April 27–29, 1912 – Impacted much of the same region

== Sources ==
- Carroll, Jeff (2007). Sam Rice: A Biography of the Washington Senators Hall of Famer. McFarland. ISBN 978-0786431199.
- Grazulis, Thomas P. (July 1993). Significant Tornadoes 1680–1991: A Chronology and Analysis of Events. St. Johnsbury, Vermont: The Tornado Project of Environmental Films. ISBN 1-879362-03-1.
- Grazulis, Thomas P. (2001a). The Tornado: Nature's Ultimate Windstorm. Norman: University of Oklahoma Press. ISBN 978-0-8061-3538-0.
- Grazulis, Thomas P. (2001b). F5-F6 Tornadoes. St. Johnsbury, Vermont: The Tornado Project of Environmental Films.
