= Langdon Township, Kansas =

Township in Reno County, Kansas, U.S.

Langdon Township
- Township
- Location within Reno County
- Coordinates: 37.866276°N 98.310849°W
- Country: United States
- State: Kansas
- County: Reno
- Established: 1874

Government
  - District 2 County Commissioner: Ron Hirst

Area
  - Total: 36.332 sq mi (94.10 km^{2})
  - Land: 36.298 sq mi (94.01 km^{2})
  - Water: 0.034 sq mi (0.088 km^{2}) 0.09%

Population (2020)
  - Total: 103
  - Density: 2.84/sq mi (1.10/km^{2})
- Time zone: UTC-6 (CST)
  - Summer (DST): UTC-5 (CDT)
- Area code: 620
- GNIS feature ID: 473609

Langdon Township is a township in Reno County, Kansas, United States. As of the 2020 census, its population was 103.

== History ==
The first township in Reno County was Reno Township, which covered the whole county upon its creation in 1872. In 1874, Langdon Township was split off from it. In 1876 and 1877, Grove Township and Loda Township respectively would be created from Langdon Township.

== Geography ==
Langdon Township covers an area of 36.332 square miles (94.10 square kilometers).

=== Communities ===
- Langdon

=== Adjacent townships ===
Plevna Township, Reno County
Sylvia Township, Reno County	northwest	north	northeast	Westminster Township, Reno County
Grove Township, Reno County	west	self	east	Arlington Township, Reno County
Miami Township, Reno County	southwest	south
Bell Township, Reno County

== Transportation ==
=== Major highways ===
- K-61
