= Township 6, Pratt County, Kansas =

Township in Pratt County, Kansas, U.S.

Township 6
- Township
- Location within Pratt County
- Coordinates: 37.740462°N 98.566082°W
- Country: United States
- State: Kansas
- County: Pratt
- Established: 1970s

Government
  - County Commissioner District 2: Morgan Trinkle

Area
  - Total: 147.439 sq mi (381.87 km^{2})
  - Land: 147.254 sq mi (381.39 km^{2})
  - Water: 0.185 sq mi (0.48 km^{2}) 0.13%

Population (2020)
  - Total: 490
  - Density: 3.3/sq mi (1.3/km^{2})
- Time zone: UTC-6 (CST)
  - Summer (DST): UTC-5 (CDT)
- Area code: 620
- GNIS feature ID: 473770

Township 6 is a township in Pratt County, Kansas, United States. As of the 2020 census, its population was 490.

== History ==
Township 6 was created in the 1970s from the former townships of Carmi, Haynesville, and Logan Townships as well as part of the former Valley Township.

== Geography ==
Township 6 covers an area of 147.439 square miles (381.87 square kilometers). The South Fork Ninnescah River flows through it.

=== Communities ===
- Preston

=== Adjacent townships ===
York Township, Stafford County
Union Township, Stafford County	northwest	north	northeast	Grove Township, Reno County
Township 7, Pratt County	west	self	east	Miami Township, Reno County; Dresden Township, Kingman County
		south	southeast	Rural Township, Kingman County
Township 12, Pratt County

== Transportation ==
=== Major highways ===
- US-54
- US-400
- K-61
