= Pete's Candy Store =

New York performing space, bar and club

Coordinates: 40°43′4.99″N 73°57′0.76″W

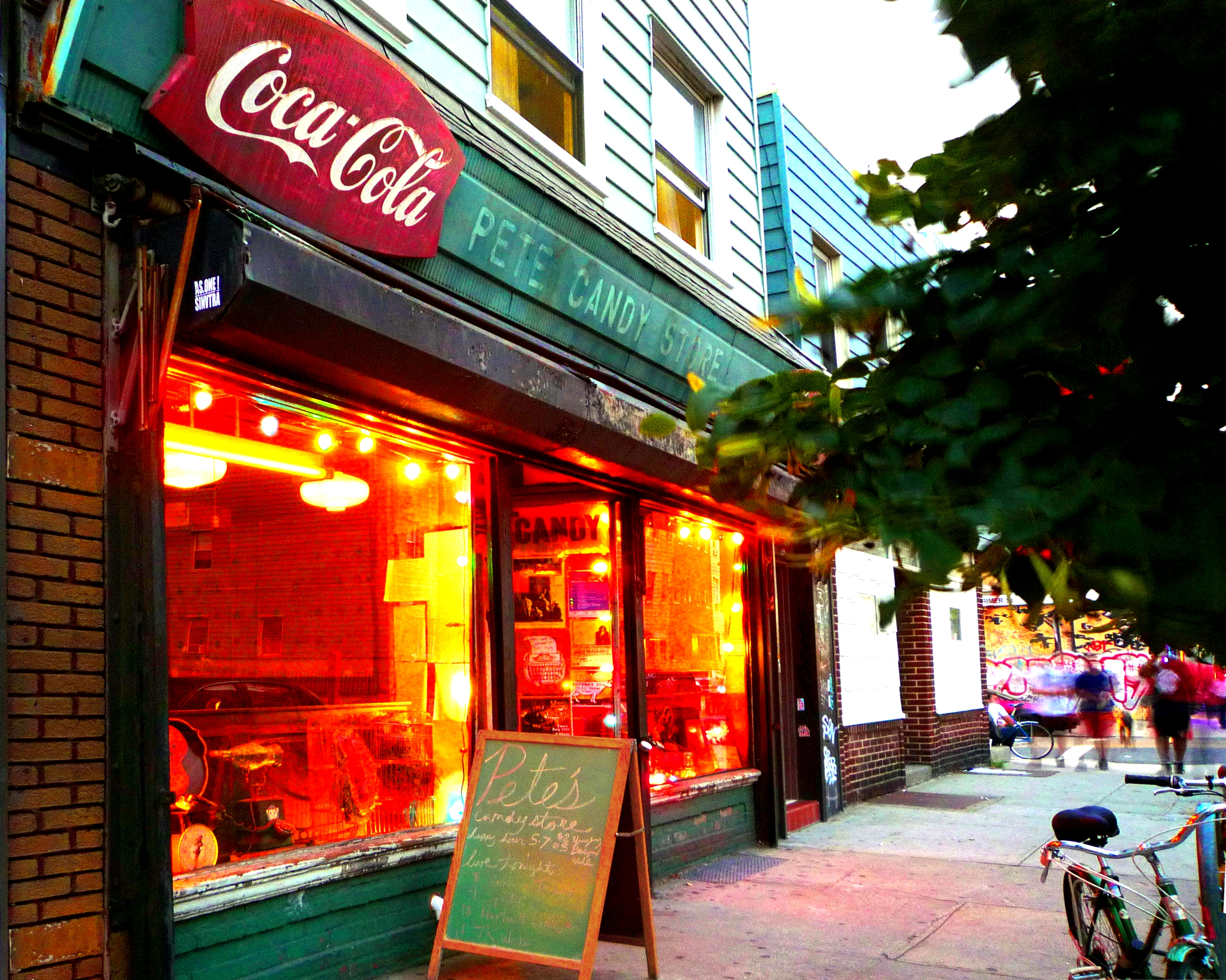
- Interactive map of Pete's Candy Store
- Address: 709 Lorimer Street
- Location: Williamsburg, Brooklyn, New York City
- Owner: Andy McDowell
- Type: Music venue, bar
- Capacity: 125

Construction
- Opened: December 1, 1999

Website
- petescandystore.com

Pete's Candy Store is a music venue and bar located at 709 Lorimer Street in the Williamsburg neighborhood of Brooklyn, New York City. Opened on December 1, 1999, it is considered Williamsburg's original nightly live music venue and has hosted early performances by artists who later achieved mainstream success, including Norah Jones, Vampire Weekend, Sharon Van Etten, Sufjan Stevens, and Devendra Banhart.

== History ==
=== Early history of the building ===
The storefront at 709 Lorimer Street has been in continuous operation since the 1920s. It was originally a general store run by a family known locally as "Funzi's." By the 1970s, ownership passed to Pete Caruso, who gave the establishment its current name. Under Caruso, the space functioned as a diner and neighborhood gathering spot, with poker tables in the back room that would later become the performance space.

=== Opening as a music venue ===
In 1999, Andy McDowell, a former film and television set designer, leased the storefront from building owner Jerry Trotta. McDowell, who had moved to Williamsburg in 1990, was drawn to the location's relative isolation at the time, describing the area between Frost and Richardson Streets as "like the Bermuda Triangle" where few people walked. McDowell opened Pete's Candy Store on December 1, 1999, with co-founder Juliana Nash serving as general manager and music booker. British singer Beth Orton performed the venue's first show before the back room was even fully completed. Nash established many of the venue's early residencies, booking acts including the Howard Fishman Quartet, Reverend Vince Anderson and his Love Choir, and Greg Garing.

The venue quickly became a center of the emerging Williamsburg music scene. The intimate back room, which reviewers have compared to a train car, became known for hosting artists before they achieved wider recognition. Norah Jones performed there in the early 2000s, and bands including Clap Your Hands Say Yeah, Dirty Projectors, The Walkmen, and Joanna Newsom played the venue in their early years. In 2019, British pop singer Dua Lipa filmed portions of her music video for "Don't Start Now" at the venue. The venue celebrated its 20th anniversary in December 2019 with a week-long festival featuring returning artists and former staff members. In December 2024, Pete's celebrated its 25th anniversary. McDowell, who now owns the building after purchasing it from Trotta, has stated his intention to keep the venue unchanged.

== Programming ==
Pete's Candy Store hosts live music nightly, with all performances free of charge. The venue maintains a policy of primarily booking unknown and unsigned artists, many of whom have subsequently achieved greater recognition. In addition to music, the venue hosts weekly trivia nights, open mic nights, and a variety of recurring events including poetry readings, comedy shows, and an LGBTQ+ comedy showcase called Kweendom. The venue has also hosted the reading series Pete's Reading Series, Astronomy on Tap meetings, and various community events.

=== Revolution Church ===
From 2006 to 2013, Pete's Candy Store served as the New York City home of Revolution Church, a nondenominational congregation led by pastor Jay Bakker, the son of televangelists Jim Bakker and Tammy Faye Messner. Services were held on Sunday afternoons in the venue's back room, with up to 75 attendees. Bakker, who described Revolution as "a church about God's grace and love" that welcomed "all people with no expectations of change," relocated to Minneapolis in 2013.
