= Rochester Township, Kansas =

Rochester Township
- Township
- Location in Kingman County
- Coordinates: 37°25′45″N 98°18′01″W
- Country: United States
- State: Kansas
- County: Kingman

Area
  - Total: 36.27 sq mi (93.95 km^{2})
  - Land: 36.24 sq mi (93.87 km^{2})
  - Water: 0.035 sq mi (0.09 km^{2}) 0.1%
- Elevation: 1,654 ft (504 m)

Population (2020)
  - Total: 137
  - Density: 3.78/sq mi (1.46/km^{2})
- GNIS feature ID: 0470405

Rochester Township is a township in Kingman County, Kansas, United States. As of the 2020 census, its population was 137.

== Geography ==
Rochester Township covers an area of 36.28 square miles (93.95 square kilometers); of this, 0.03 square miles (0.09 square kilometers) or 0.1 percent is water. The streams of Goose Creek and Kemp Creek run through this township.

=== Communities ===
- Zenda

=== Adjacent townships ===
- Peters Township (north)
- Belmont Township (northeast)
- Chikaskia Township (east)
- Township No. 1, Harper County (south)
- Ridge Township, Barber County (southwest)
- Liberty Township (west)
- Kingman Township (northwest)

=== Cemeteries ===
The township contains three cemeteries: Nichols, Pleasant Hill and Saint Johns.

=== Major highways ===
- K-42
