= Peters Township, Kansas =

Peters Township
- Township
- Location in Kingman County
- Coordinates: 37°31′00″N 98°18′01″W
- Country: United States
- State: Kansas
- County: Kingman

Area
  - Total: 36.05 sq mi (93.36 km^{2})
  - Land: 36.04 sq mi (93.34 km^{2})
  - Water: 0.0077 sq mi (0.02 km^{2}) 0.02%
- Elevation: 1,654 ft (504 m)

Population (2020)
  - Total: 111
  - Density: 3.08/sq mi (1.19/km^{2})
- GNIS feature ID: 0470406

Peters Township is a township in Kingman County, Kansas, United States. As of the 2020 census, its population was 111.

== Geography ==
Peters Township covers an area of 36.05 square miles (93.36 square kilometers); of this, 0.01 square miles (0.02 square kilometers) or 0.02 percent is water. The streams of Allen Creek, Cross Creek and Peters Creek run through this township.

=== Communities ===
- Willowdale

(This list is based on USGS data and may include former settlements.)

=== Adjacent townships ===
- Union Township (north)
- Ninnescah Township (northeast)
- Belmont Township (east)
- Chikaskia Township (southeast)
- Rochester Township (south)
- Liberty Township (southwest)
- Kingman Township (west)
- Rural Township (northwest)
