= Township 2 =

Township 2 can refer to:

- Township 2, Benton County, Arkansas
- Township 2, Harper County, Kansas
- Township 2, Rooks County, Kansas
- Township 2, Washington County, Nebraska
