= Skellyville, Kansas =

Unincorporated community in Kingman County, Kansas

- Unincorporated community
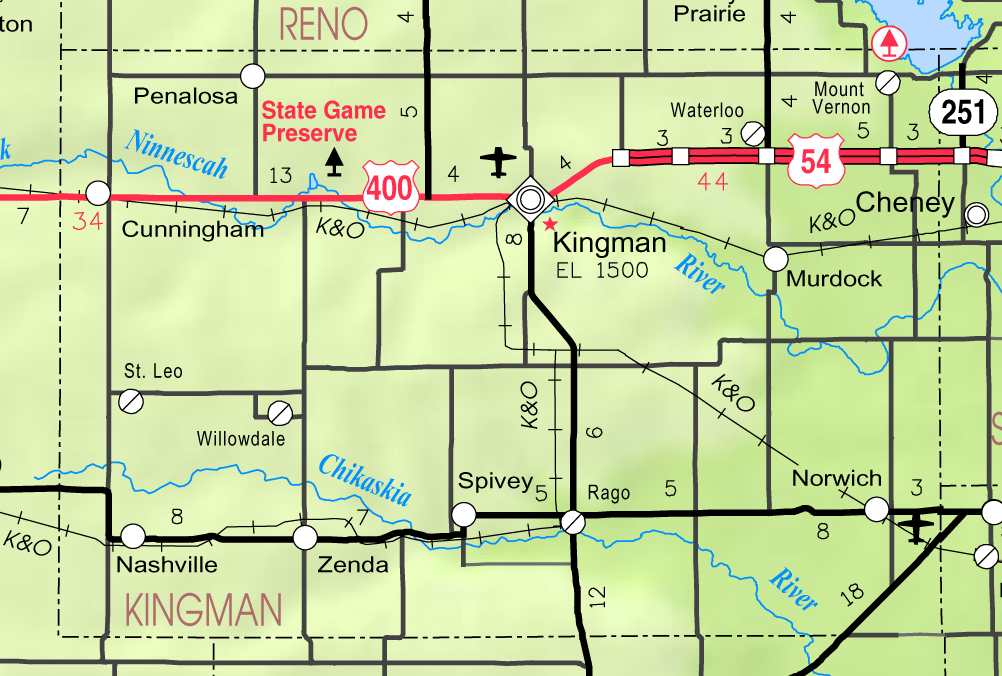
- KDOT map of Kingman County (legend)

- Location within the state of Kansas
- Coordinates: 37°40′30″N 98°27′1″W
- Country: United States
- State: Kansas
- County: Kingman
- Township: Dresden
- Elevation: 1,696 ft (517 m)
- Time zone: UTC-6 (CST)
  - Summer (DST): UTC-5 (CDT)
- Area code: 620
- FIPS code: 20-65750
- GNIS ID: 484662

Skellyville is an unincorporated community in Kingman County, Kansas, United States. It is located approximately two miles (3.2 km) northwest of Cunningham on the north side of the South Fork Ninnescah River.

== History ==
Skellyville was formed as an "oil town" when oil was discovered in the area. As the pocket of oil dried up, the population decreased as well.

== Education ==
The community is served by Cunningham–West Kingman County USD 332 public school district.
