= Liberty Township, Kingman County, Kansas =

Liberty Township
- Township
- Location in Kingman County
- Coordinates: 37°25′45″N 98°24′31″W
- Country: United States
- State: Kansas
- County: Kingman

Area
  - Total: 36.31 sq mi (94.03 km^{2})
  - Land: 36.29 sq mi (93.99 km^{2})
  - Water: 0.019 sq mi (0.05 km^{2}) 0.05%
- Elevation: 1,732 ft (528 m)

Population (2020)
  - Total: 124
  - Density: 3.42/sq mi (1.32/km^{2})
- GNIS feature ID: 0470396

Liberty Township is a township in Kingman County, Kansas, United States. As of the 2020 census, its population was 124.

== Geography ==
Liberty Township covers an area of 36.31 square miles (94.03 square kilometers); of this, 0.02 square miles (0.05 square kilometers) or 0.05 percent is water. The stream of Skunk Creek runs through this township.

=== Communities ===
- Nashville

=== Adjacent townships ===
- Kingman Township (north)
- Peters Township (northeast)
- Rochester Township (east)
- Ridge Township, Barber County (south)
- Medicine Lodge Township, Barber County (southwest)
- Township No. 11 Township, Pratt County (west)
- Valley Township, Barber County (west)

=== Cemeteries ===
The township contains two cemeteries: Nashville and Saint John.

=== Major highways ===
- K-42
