= St. Leo, Kansas =

Unincorporated community in Kingman County, Kansas

- Unincorporated community
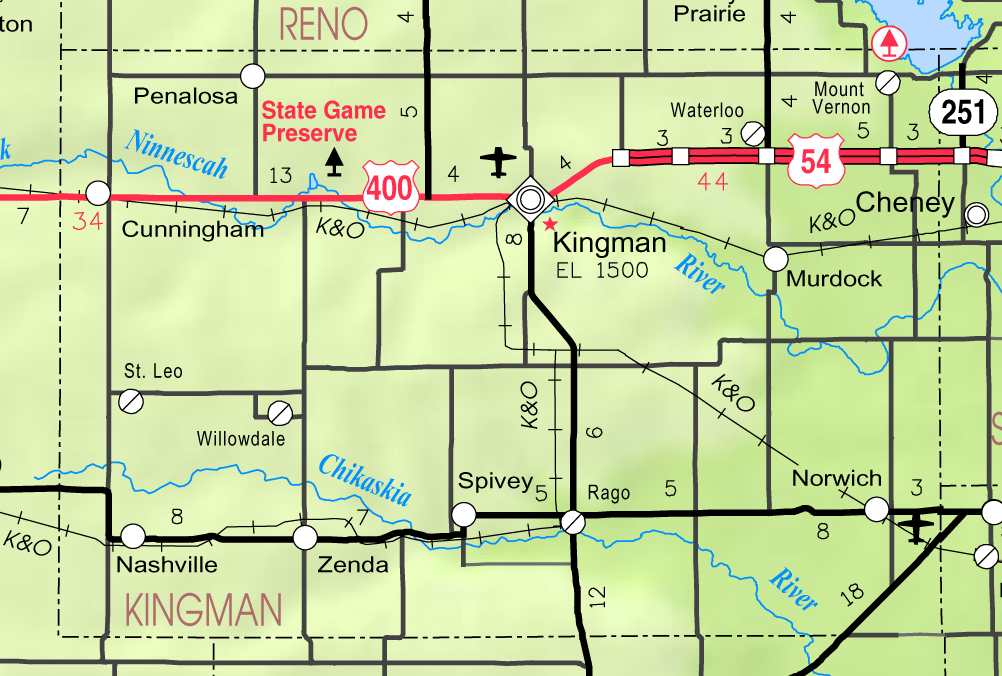
- KDOT map of Kingman County (legend)

- Location within Kansas Location within the United States
- Coordinates: 37°31′45″N 98°24′37″W
- Country: United States
- State: Kansas
- County: Kingman
- Elevation: 1,759 ft (536 m)
- Time zone: UTC-6 (CST)
  - Summer (DST): UTC-5 (CDT)
- ZIP Code: 67112
- Area code: 620
- FIPS code: 20-62350
- GNIS ID: 474281

St. Leo is a rural unincorporated community in southwestern Kingman County, Kansas, United States. It is located eight miles south of Cunningham (and U.S. Route 54) at the intersection of SW 160 Ave and SW 80 St; also it is located six miles north of Nashville.

== History ==
St. Leo features a Catholic church and has an active parish community.

== Geography ==
The statistics of St. Leo are as follows: elevation is 1759 feet, latitude is 37° 31′ 45″N, longitude is 98° 24′ 37″W.

== Education ==
The community is served by Cunningham–West Kingman County USD 332 public school district.

== See also ==
- List of Rescue 911 episodes
