= Vince Anderson =

Vince Anderson may refer to:

- Vince Anderson (mountaineer), American mountaineer, writer and mountain guide company manager
- Vince Anderson (American football), gridiron football defensive back
- Reverend Vince Anderson, American musician
- Vinnie Anderson, New Zealand rugby league player
