= Kingman Township, Kansas =

Kingman Township
- Township
- Location in Kingman County
- Coordinates: 37°31′00″N 98°24′31″W
- Country: United States
- State: Kansas
- County: Kingman

Area
  - Total: 3.49 sq mi (9.03 km^{2})
  - Land: 3.47 sq mi (8.99 km^{2})
  - Water: 0.015 sq mi (0.04 km^{2}) 0.44%
- Elevation: 1,749 ft (533 m)

Population (2020)
  - Total: 99
  - Density: 29/sq mi (11/km^{2})
- GNIS feature ID: 0470397

Kingman Township is a township in Kingman County, Kansas, United States. As of the United States census in 2020, its population was 99.

== Geography ==
Kingman Township covers an area of 3.49 square miles (9.03 square kilometers); of this, 0.01 square miles (0.04 square kilometers) or 0.44 percent is water. The stream of North Fork Chikaskia River runs through this township.

=== Communities ===
- St. Leo

=== Adjacent townships ===
- Rural Township (north)
- Union Township (northeast)
- Peters Township (east)
- Rochester Township (southwest)
- Liberty Township (south)

=== Cemeteries ===
The township contains three cemeteries: Bross, Walnut Hill, and West Point.

=== Major highways ===
- U.S. Route 54
- K-14

=== Airports and landing strips ===
- Kingman Municipal Airport
