= Ernest Schmidt =

American basketball player (1911–1986)

Ernest J. Schmidt (February 12, 1911 – September 6, 1986) was an American college basketball player born in Nashville, Kansas. He played college basketball for Kansas State Teachers College of Pittsburg in the early 1930s and was considered one of the best players of his time. He led the team to 47 straight victories and four straight conference titles. He was nicknamed "One Grand" for scoring exactly 1,000 points during his college career. He was enshrined in the Naismith Memorial Basketball Hall of Fame in 1974.

Schmidt died on the 6th of September 1996 in Kansas, United States. He is buried alongside his wife, Marcelle, in Goodland Cemetery, Kansas.
