= Eureka Township, Kingman County, Kansas =

Eureka Township
- Township
- Location in Kingman County
- Coordinates: 37°41′55″N 98°18′01″W
- Country: United States
- State: Kansas
- County: Kingman

Area
  - Total: 36.08 sq mi (93.44 km^{2})
  - Land: 35.84 sq mi (92.82 km^{2})
  - Water: 0.24 sq mi (0.63 km^{2}) 0.67%
- Elevation: 1,719 ft (524 m)

Population (2020)
  - Total: 88
  - Density: 2.5/sq mi (0.95/km^{2})
- GNIS feature ID: 0473955

Eureka Township is a township in Kingman County, Kansas, United States. As of the 2020 census, its population was 88.

== Geography ==
Eureka Township covers an area of 36.08 square miles (93.44 square kilometers); of this, 0.24 square miles (0.63 square kilometers) or 0.67 percent is water.

=== Communities ===
- Penalosa

=== Adjacent townships ===
- Bell Township, Reno County (north)
- Loda Township, Reno County (northeast)
- Hoosier Township (east)
- Ninnescah Township (southeast)
- Union Township (south)
- Rural Township (southwest)
- Dresden Township (west)
- Miami Township, Reno County (northwest)

=== Major highways ===
- U.S. Route 54
