= Dresden Township, Kingman County, Kansas =

Dresden Township
- Township
- Location in Kingman County
- Coordinates: 37°41′20″N 98°24′36″W
- Country: United States
- State: Kansas
- County: Kingman

Area
  - Total: 36.13 sq mi (93.57 km^{2})
  - Land: 36.05 sq mi (93.38 km^{2})
  - Water: 0.073 sq mi (0.19 km^{2}) 0.2%
- Elevation: 1,755 ft (535 m)

Population (2020)
  - Total: 308
  - Density: 8.54/sq mi (3.30/km^{2})
- GNIS feature ID: 0473948

Dresden Township is a township in Kingman County, Kansas, United States. As of the 2020 census, its population was 308.

== Geography ==
Dresden Township covers an area of 36.13 square miles (93.57 square kilometers); of this, 0.07 square miles (0.19 square kilometers) or 0.2 percent is water.

=== Communities ===
- Cunningham (north half)
- Skellyville

=== Adjacent townships ===
- Miami Township, Reno County (north)
- Bell Township, Reno County (northeast)
- Eureka Township (east)
- Union Township (southeast)
- Rural Township (south)
- Township No. 12 Township, Pratt County (west)
- Township No. 6 Township, Pratt County (west)

=== Cemeteries ===
The township contains one cemetery, Dresden (also known as Shelman Cemetery).

=== Major highways ===
- U.S. Route 54
