= One Punk Under God =

Documentary film about Jay Bakker, preacher son of Jim and Tammy Faye

- Genre: Documentary
- Written by: Kyung-Sun Yu
- Starring: Jay Bakker
- Country of origin: United States
- Original language: English
- No. of seasons: 1
- No. of episodes: 6

Production
- Producer: Jeremy Simmons
- Production company: World of Wonder

Original release
- Network: Sundance Channel
- Release: 13 December 2006 – 17 January 2007

One Punk Under God is a 2006 original observational documentary that aired on the Sundance Channel, directed and produced by Jeremy Simmons. It focused on the life of Jay Bakker, only son of Jim Bakker and Tammy Faye Messner (formerly Bakker), formerly evangelical ministers and hosts of The PTL Club. The documentary is a six-part series of half-hour episodes.
