= Roe Messner =

American building contractor (1935–2025)

- Born: Ronald Roe Messner; August 1, 1935; Waldron, Kansas, U.S.
- Died: March 24, 2025 (aged 89); Wichita, Kansas, U.S.
- Occupation: Building contractor
- Spouses: Ruth Ann Messner (m. 1955; div. 1993) Tammy Faye Bakker (m. 1993; died 2007) Melanie Hart (m. 2007; ann. 2008) Carol Wynn (m. 2009; died 2021) Cynthia Davis (m. 2022)
- Children: 4
- Website: roemessner.com

Ronald Roe Messner (August 1, 1935 – March 24, 2025) was an American building contractor (Messner Construction) who built more than 1,700 churches, including several megachurches.

Having divorced his first wife, he married televangelist Tammy Faye Bakker in 1993 after her divorce from husband and PTL Club founder Jim Bakker.

== Heritage USA ==
Messner gained fame with the construction of Heritage USA in 1978 at the behest of Jim Bakker. In 1987, he and his first wife, Ruth Ann, wrote a book titled Building for the Master. He was reportedly the person who produced the money for the $265,000 payment to Jessica Hahn to cover up a sexual assault. Messner later billed PTL for work never completed on the Jerusalem Amphitheater at Heritage USA, thus playing a behind-the-scenes role in the downfall of the PTL Club. Revelations of the payoff invited scrutiny of Bakker's finances, prompting him to be charged with fraud. In Bakker's fraud trial, Messner testified for Bakker's defense, asserting that Jerry Falwell had attempted to take over PTL and its associated cable television network by dispatching Messner to the Bakker home in Palm Springs, California to make an offer to "keep quiet".

According to Messner's testimony, Tammy wrote the offer on her stationery, listing a $300,000-a-year lifetime salary for Jim, $100,000 a year for Tammy, a house, and a year's worth of free phone calls and health insurance. However, Messner said Bakker wrote on it: "I'm not making any demands on PTL. I'm not asking for anything." Falwell denied making any offer. In the messy bankruptcy of PTL, Messner was listed as the single biggest creditor of PTL with an outstanding claim of $14 million. In court papers, the new operators accused Messner of $5.3 million in inflated or phony billings to PTL.

== Marriage to Tammy Faye ==
Messner divorced his first wife in 1993. At about the same time, Tammy Faye divorced Bakker. Messner and Tammy Faye were married in and lived in Rancho Mirage, California.

In 1996, Messner was convicted of bankruptcy fraud, having claimed to owe nearly $30 million to over 300 creditors in 1990. As he faced sentencing in 1996, he said he could not afford to treat his prostate cancer because he lacked health insurance. He was sentenced to and served 27 months in prison.

Messner published Church Growth by Design, another book on church building, in 2003.

== Later life and death ==
Messner and Tammy Faye moved to the gated community of Loch Lloyd, Missouri, a suburb of Kansas City, in 2007. Tammy Faye died from cancer on July 20 that year; her last public appearance was a taped interview on CNN from their home the day before. Her ashes were interred in the Messner family plot in Waldron, Kansas, immediately next to Messner's mother.

Roe Messner was first diagnosed with prostate cancer in 1996. In 2007, he told Larry King that his doctors had told him that he would not die from the disease, an accurate prediction. Messner died in Wichita, Kansas on March 24, 2025, at the age of 89.

== Notable churches ==
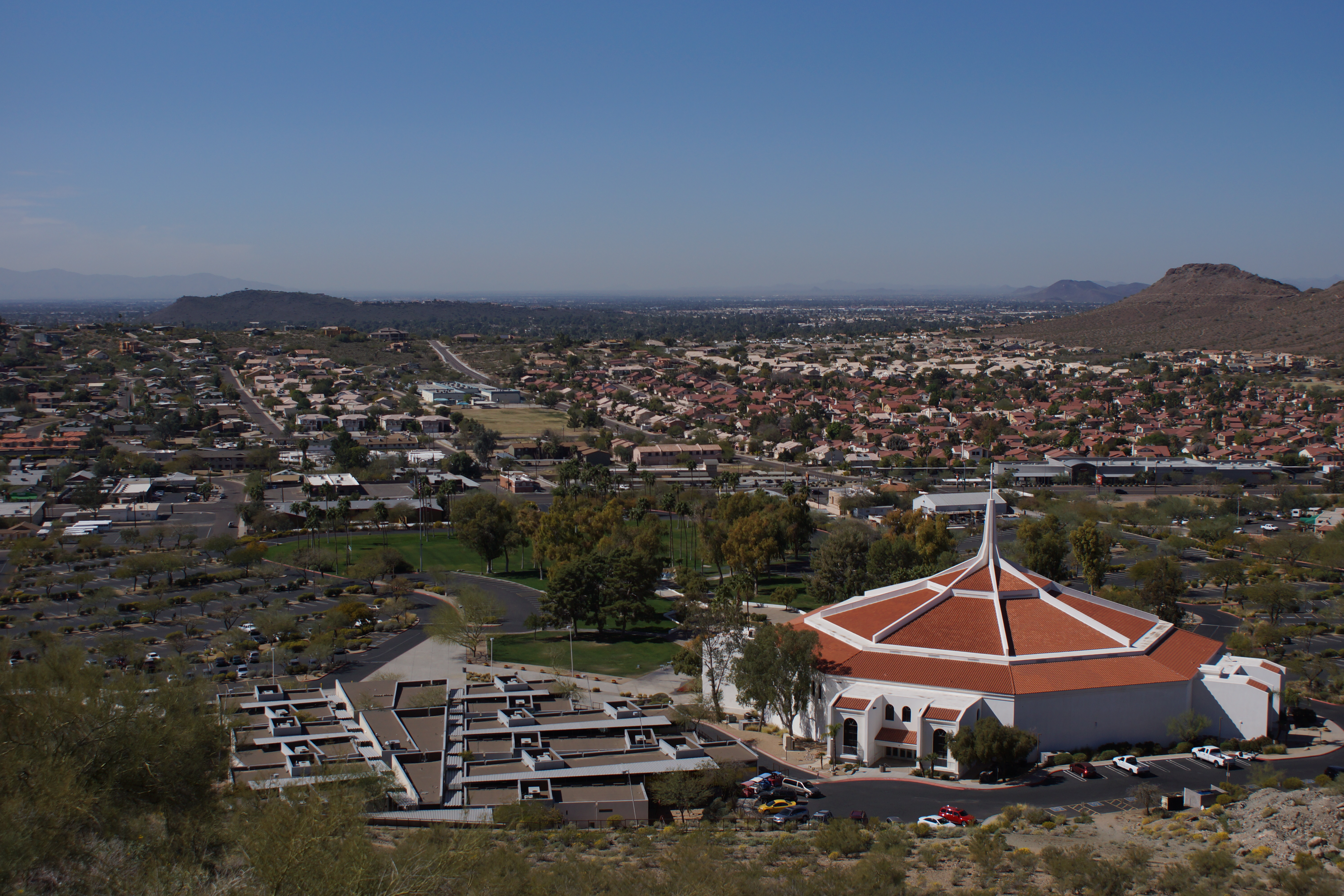
Dream City Church in Phoenix, Arizona

Messner is reported to have been the biggest church builder in the United States. On August 7, 2007, he told Larry King that he had built 1,784 churches in 47 states. Messner supervised construction of the churches but was not the architect. He designed and/or built over 1,800 churches in all 50 states.

- Calvary Temple (1958) – Denver, Colorado
- Pleasant Valley Methodist (1960) – Wichita, Kansas
- Oak Cliff Assembly of God (1963) – Dallas, Texas
- Evangelical United Brethren (1967) – Marion, Kansas
- World Harvest Church (1983) – Columbus, Ohio
- Dream City Church (1984) – Phoenix, Arizona
- Rockford First Assembly of God (1984) – Rockford, Illinois
- Capital Christian Center (1984) – Sacramento, California
- Hillside Christian Center (1986) – Napa, California
- Carpenter's Home Church (1986) – Lakeland, Florida
- Church on the Rock (1986) – Rockwall, Texas
- Bethel Church – Redding, California
- Calvary Church (Charlotte) (1988) – Charlotte, North Carolina
- Bellevue Baptist Church (1989) – Memphis, Tennessee
- Cathedral of the Holy Spirit (1989) – Decatur, Georgia
- The Gate Church (1990) – Oklahoma City, Oklahoma
- Deliverance Church (1990) – Philadelphia, Pennsylvania
- Central Community Church (1990) – Wichita, Kansas
- Point Harbor Community Church (2003) – Chesapeake, Virginia
- Redemption (2003) – Greenville, South Carolina
