= J. T. Buck =

American composer

- Born: June 6, 1978 (age 46); Akron, Ohio, U.S.
- Known for: composer, lyricist, director, music director, musician

J. T. Buck (born 6 June 1978) is a composer, and lyricist, and stage director, and project coordinator.

Born and raised in Akron, Buck graduated from Central-Hower High School in 1996. He spent his first few years post high school working as a freelance musician, actor, director, and music director.

Buck spent two summers as musical director for the National Children's Theatre School summer workshops in Vail Colorado, and three summers as music director for the Columbia Gorge School of Theatre in White Salmon, Washington.

Buck received his BA in Theatre Arts with a minor in music from the University of Akron in 2004. While in Houston, Buck produced of the 2005 Albee New Plays Festival under the leadership of Pulitzer-winner Lanford Wilson, and completed an internship at the 2005 Tony Awards and the revival of Who's Afraid of Virginia Woolf under producer Elizabeth I. McCann. He was twice a student of Tony-Winning Broadway producer Stuart Ostrow's New Musical Theatre Lab.

In 2006, Buck accepted the position of Arts Director at First Grace UCC in Akron. His work there involved directing worship-related music and arts, as well as producing and directing grass-roots theatre, music, dance and visual art in collaboration with local artists.

Buck has directed a variety of pieces for the stage, including Corpus Christi, The Laramie Project, State Fair, "Book of Days", Godspell, Christopher Durang's Titanic, As Bees in Honey Drown, Dearly Departed, and Jacob Marley's Christmas Carol.

== The Gospel According to Tammy Faye ==
Buck wrote the lyrics and music for the musical The Gospel According to Tammy Faye written with fellow University of Houston student Fernando Dovalina. Although the original idea was a bar joke, the more Buck thought about it the more the idea seemed worthy, he recruited Dovalina to write the book, Faye granted the two an extended interview. One of the compelling facets of her life to the two gay men "was how from her conservative background, she came around to being a gay-friendly person" and even had a sizable gay following. The musical is a fantasy flashback retelling of televangelist Tammy Faye Bakker's life story. Written after a lengthy interview granted to the authors by Tammy Faye, the show had its world premiere at the 2006 Cincinnati Fringe Festival, it was subsequently given an Equity reading by the Columbia Gorge Repertory Company in Portland and Hood River, Oregon. The show had a profitable July run on the stage of Houston's famous Alley Theatre, as a benefit produced by and for Bering and Friends, a Houston AIDS charity that stages a show each year to raise funds for AIDS charity. The production opened on the same night Faye died and saw a flood of media attention because of her death. The musical received an industry reading in NYC in December 2007, starring Tony-Nominee Sally Mayes as Faye, and veteran Broadway actors William Youmans, Julie Foldesi, Heather Parcells and James T. Lane.

== 2008-present ==
Buck Has lived and worked all of his life in Akron, where he directed a production of Lanford Wilson's 'Book of Days' in summer 2008. In 2009 he directed "Elegies for Angels, Punks and Raging Queens," an evening of monologues and songs inspired by the NAMES Project AIDS Memorial Quilt.

In September 2010 he was the musical director of Joseph and the Amazing Technicolor Dreamcoat as part of Weathervane Playhouse's Young Actors Series.

== Sources ==
- Robert Viagas, Aubrey Reuben, The Playbill Broadway Yearbook: June 2005 - May 2006, Hal Leonard Corporation, 2006.
