= Township 2, Harper County, Kansas =

Township 2
- Township
- Location in Harper County
- Coordinates: 37°03′45″N 098°10′41″W
- Country: United States
- State: Kansas
- County: Harper

Area
  - Total: 140.60 sq mi (364.15 km^{2})
  - Land: 140.27 sq mi (363.29 km^{2})
  - Water: 0.33 sq mi (0.85 km^{2}) 0.23%
- Elevation: 1,289 ft (393 m)

Population (2020)
  - Total: 102
  - Density: 0.727/sq mi (0.281/km^{2})
- GNIS feature ID: 0470502

Township 2 is a township in Harper County, Kansas, United States. As of the 2020 census, its population was 102.

== History ==
The township was officially designated "Township Number 2" until late 2007, when "Number" was dropped.

== Geography ==
Township 2 covers an area of 140.6 square miles (364 km^{2}) and contains Waldron.
