= Rural Township, Kingman County, Kansas =

Rural Township
- Township
- Location in Kingman County
- Coordinates: 37°36′05″N 98°24′36″W
- Country: United States
- State: Kansas
- County: Kingman

Area
  - Total: 36.19 sq mi (93.73 km^{2})
  - Land: 36.18 sq mi (93.71 km^{2})
  - Water: 0.012 sq mi (0.03 km^{2}) 0.03%
- Elevation: 1,726 ft (526 m)

Population (2020)
  - Total: 316
  - Density: 8.73/sq mi (3.37/km^{2})
- GNIS feature ID: 0473949

Rural Township is a township in Kingman County, Kansas, United States. As of the 2020 census, its population was 316.

== Geography ==
Rural Township covers an area of 36.19 square miles (93.73 square kilometers); of this, 0.01 square miles (0.03 square kilometers) or 0.03 percent is water. The stream of Morisse Creek runs through this township.

=== Communities ===
- Cunningham (southern half)

=== Adjacent townships ===
- Dresden Township (north)
- Eureka Township (northeast)
- Union Township (east)
- Peters Township (southeast)
- Kingman Township (south)
- Township No. 11 Township, Pratt County (west)
- Township No. 12 Township, Pratt County (west)
- Township No. 6 Township, Pratt County (northwest)

=== Cemeteries ===
The township contains two cemeteries: Cunningham and Rural.

=== Major highways ===
- U.S. Route 54
