= Union Township, Kingman County, Kansas =

Union Township
- Township
- Location in Kingman County
- Coordinates: 37°36′05″N 98°18′01″W
- Country: United States
- State: Kansas
- County: Kingman

Area
  - Total: 36.23 sq mi (93.84 km^{2})
  - Land: 36.1 sq mi (93.6 km^{2})
  - Water: 0.093 sq mi (0.24 km^{2}) 0.26%
- Elevation: 1,670 ft (509 m)

Population (2020)
  - Total: 72
  - Density: 2.0/sq mi (0.77/km^{2})
- GNIS feature ID: 0473956

Union Township is a township in Kingman County, Kansas, United States. As of the 2020 census, its population was 72.

== Geography ==
Union Township covers an area of 36.23 square miles (93.84 square kilometers); of this, 0.09 square mile (0.24 square kilometer) or 0.26 percent, is water. The streams of Mead Creek, Painter Creek and Pat Creek run through this township.

=== Communities ===
- Calista

=== Adjacent townships ===
- Eureka Township (north)
- Hoosier Township (northeast)
- Ninnescah Township (east)
- Belmont Township (southeast)
- Peters Township (south)
- Kingman Township (southwest)
- Rural Township (west)
- Dresden Township (northwest)
