= Hoosier Township, Kansas =

Hoosier Township
- Township
- Location in Kingman County
- Coordinates: 37°41′20″N 98°11′26″W
- Country: United States
- State: Kansas
- County: Kingman

Area
  - Total: 36.12 sq mi (93.55 km^{2})
  - Land: 36.11 sq mi (93.53 km^{2})
  - Water: 0.0077 sq mi (0.02 km^{2}) 0.02%
- Elevation: 1,660 ft (506 m)

Population (2020)
  - Total: 152
  - Density: 4.21/sq mi (1.63/km^{2})
- GNIS feature ID: 0473954

Hoosier Township /ˈhuːʒər/ is a township in Kingman County, Kansas, United States. As of the 2020 census, its population was 152.

== Geography ==
Hoosier Township covers an area of 36.12 square miles (93.55 square kilometers); of this, 0.01 square miles (0.02 square kilometers) or 0.02 percent is water.

=== Adjacent townships ===
- Loda Township, Reno County (north)
- Roscoe Township, Reno County (northeast)
- White Township (east)
- Ninnescah Township (south and southeast)
- Union Township (southwest)
- Eureka Township (west)
- Bell Township, Reno County (northwest)

=== Cemeteries ===
The township contains one cemetery, Hoosier.

=== Major highways ===
- U.S. Route 54
- K-14
