= Cunningham–West Kingman County USD 332 =

Public school district in Cunningham, Kansas

Address
- 104 W. 4th St. Cunningham, Kansas, 67035; United States
- Coordinates: 37°38′57″N 98°25′56″W

District information
- Type: Public
- Grades: K to 12
- Schools: 2

Other information
- Website: usd332.org

Cunningham–West Kingman County USD 332 is a public unified school district headquartered in Cunningham, Kansas, United States. The district includes the communities of Cunningham, Nashville, Penalosa, Zenda, Skellyville, St. Leo, Willowdale, and nearby rural areas.

== Schools ==
The school district operates the following schools:

- Cunningham High School
- Cunningham Grade School

== See also ==
- Kansas State Department of Education
- Kansas State High School Activities Association
- List of high schools in Kansas
- List of unified school districts in Kansas
