= Agnes, Texas =

Ghost town in Texas, US

- Ghost town
- Location within Texas
- Coordinates: 32.9792888°N 97.7886421°W
- Country: United States
- State: Texas
- County: Parker
- Elevation: 1,210 ft (370 m)

Agnes is a ghost town in Parker County, Texas, United States. Situated on State Highway 199, it was settled in the late 1870s. A post office operated from 1879 to 1907. It was named for Agnes Mull, daughter of a North Texas physician and pioneer. At its peak in the mid-1880s, it had a population of 75.
