= Bell Township, Reno County, Kansas =

Township in Reno County, Kansas, U.S.

Bell Township
- Township
- Location within Reno County
- Coordinates: 37.783243°N 98.291989°W
- Country: United States
- State: Kansas
- County: Reno
- Established: 1878

Government
  - District 2 County Commissioner: Ron Hirst

Area
  - Total: 38.027 sq mi (98.49 km^{2})
  - Land: 37.984 sq mi (98.38 km^{2})
  - Water: 0.043 sq mi (0.11 km^{2}) 0.11%

Population (2020)
  - Total: 67
  - Density: 1.8/sq mi (0.68/km^{2})
- Time zone: UTC-6 (CST)
  - Summer (DST): UTC-5 (CDT)
- Area code: 620
- GNIS feature ID: 473782

Bell Township is a township in Reno County, Kansas, United States. As of the 2020 census, its population was 67.

== History ==
The first township in Reno County was Reno Township, which covered the whole county upon its creation in 1872. In 1874 Langdon Township was split off of it. From Langdon Township, Grove Township was split off in 1876, and then in 1878 Bell Township was split off from Grove Township.

== Geography ==
Bell Township covers an area of 38.027 square miles (98.49 square kilometers).

=== Adjacent townships ===
Langdon Township, Reno County
		north	northeast	Arlington Township, Reno County
Miami Township, Reno County	west	self	east	Loda Township, Reno County
Dresden Township, Kingman County	southwest	south	southeast	Hoosier Township, Kingman County
Eureka Township, Kingman County
