= Miami Township, Reno County, Kansas =

Township in Reno County, Kansas, U.S.

Miami Township
- Township
- Location within Reno County
- Coordinates: 37.77726°N 98.409368°W
- Country: United States
- State: Kansas
- County: Reno

Government
  - District 2 County Commissioner: Ron Hirst

Area
  - Total: 37.999 sq mi (98.42 km^{2})
  - Land: 37.934 sq mi (98.25 km^{2})
  - Water: 0.065 sq mi (0.17 km^{2}) 0.17%

Population (2020)
  - Total: 385
  - Density: 10.1/sq mi (3.92/km^{2})
- Time zone: UTC-6 (CST)
  - Summer (DST): UTC-5 (CDT)
- Area code: 620
- GNIS feature ID: 473775

Miami Township is a township in Reno County, Kansas, United States. As of the 2020 census, its population was 385.

== Geography ==
Miami Township covers an area of 37.999 square miles (98.42 square kilometers).

=== Communities ===
- Turon

=== Adjacent townships ===
Grove Township, Reno County
		north	northeast	Langdon Township, Reno County
Township 6, Pratt County	west	self	east	Bell Township, Reno County
		south	southeast	Eureka Township, Kingman County
Dresden Township, Kingman County

== Transportation ==
=== Major highways ===
- K-61
