= Reverend Vince Anderson =

American musician

Reverend Vince Anderson is an American, New York City based musician. He has performed a weekly show every Monday night at Union Pool in Brooklyn for over 25 years. Reverend Vince calls his high energy gospel-rock music "dirty gospel", and has been described as a Brooklyn institution.

"Get out of his way. With two decades of sharing worship and making music at a Brooklyn bar, the Rev. Vince Anderson appears to be unstoppable." - The New York Times

Reverend Vince is the subject of a documentary called The Reverend. Winner of the DOC NYC Audience Award, the film follows Vince's music and ministry. It was released theatrically by Factory 25, and is now streaming on The Criterion Channel, Prime Video, and NightFlight Plus.

In the early 1990s, Anderson studied to become a minister, but dropped out to pursue music. Reverend Vince ran a church for progressive evangelicals with Jay Bakker, and now is director of music and community development for a few church communities in New York City. Vince works nationally with the organization Vote Common Good.

His band The Love Choir consists of "Moist" Paula Henderson, Jaleel Bunton, Dave "Smoota" Smith, and Ryan Sawyer. Musicians who have performed at Vince's weekly residency include Questlove, members of TV On The Radio, Meah Pace, Binky Griptite, Resistance Revival Chorus, Kendra Morris, The Harlem Gospel Travelers, Julia Haltigan, and Eli "Paperboy" Reed.

Time Out describes his weekly show as "somewhere between Wesley Willis and Tammy Faye Messner". He has also been called "the Holy Sprit meets the Tasmanian Devil"

== Partial discography ==
- Rev Vince Anderson & The Love Choir
