= Jay Bakker =

American pastor, author and speaker (born 1975)

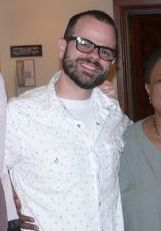
- Bakker in 2007
- Born: Jamie Charles Bakker; December 18, 1975 (age 50); Charlotte, North Carolina, U.S.
- Occupations: Pastor; author; speaker
- Spouses: Amanda Moses (divorced); Karin Aebersold (m. 2013)
- Children: 2
- Parents: Jim Bakker (father); Tammy Faye Bakker (mother)
- Website: revolutionchurch.com

James Charles "Jay" Bakker (born December 18, 1975) is an American pastor, author, and speaker. He is the son of televangelists Jim and Tammy Faye Bakker.

During his young adult years, Bakker became disillusioned with mainstream Christianity, becoming particularly critical of Christian fundamentalism and the Christian right. He later adopted a much more liberal form of Christianity and became a co-founder of Revolution Church, which was created in 1994 in Phoenix, Arizona. Bakker then preached at Revolution's Atlanta location before pastoring the New York City branch of Revolution Church, which held services at the bar and venue Pete's Candy Store, in the Williamsburg section of Brooklyn until Bakker relocated to Minneapolis in 2013 and began pastoring another iteration of Revolution Church there. Much of Bakker's story was retold in a 2006 documentary on Sundance Channel called One Punk Under God: The Prodigal Son of Jim and Tammy Faye. His story has also been chronicled in Time Magazine.

== Early life ==
Bakker was born December 18, 1975, in Charlotte, North Carolina, to Christian televangelist pastors Jim and Tammy Faye Bakker (née LaValley).

In 1988, when Bakker was 12 years old, his father was indicted on eight counts of mail fraud, 15 counts of wire fraud and one count of conspiracy and spent six years in federal prison.

The trauma of his father's imprisonment, combined with the subsequent ostracism by others in the church and religious community, led Bakker to engage in a period of substance abuse and partying during his young adult years. Bakker would also ultimately experience a "liberation" from his father's conservative interpretation of Christian theology.

== Political and social views ==
Bakker would undergo a "liberation" from his father's more conservative "brand of Christianity" in 1994, with this "liberation" also inspiring him co-found the Revelation Church the same year. Bakker has advocated for an open, inclusive Christianity that embraces those with alternative lifestyles and encourages doubt and uncertainty. He has also endorsed gay marriage and has been an advocate for the church's acceptance of the LGBTQ community. He has also questioned traditional interpretations of the atonement and salvation. When asked by Larry King if he was "part of the liberal sect of Christianity," he said that he was "more liberal than most". He also decries the influence of politics in religion, saying that it prevents civil discussion of topics such as homosexuality and abortion. Bakker's church used rainbow-colored communion bread to celebrate the legalization of gay marriage in Minnesota.

== Appearances in media ==
In 2001, Bakker wrote the book Son of a Preacher Man: My Search for Grace in the Shadows which is an autobiography that details his youth, relationship with his parents, the PTL scandals, his anguish at his father's imprisonment, and the founding of Revolution Church.

In 2006, he was featured in the six-part documentary One Punk Under God on the Sundance Channel.

He has appeared on Larry King Live and The Joy Behar Show (August 23, 2011) and has been featured in Rolling Stone, The New York Times, Time, The Economist, FHM and New York Magazine.

In 2011, Bakker and co-author Martin Edlund wrote the book Fall to Grace: A Revolution of God, Self, and Society.

In an episode of American Scandals with Barbara Walters (aired on December 14, 2015, for Investigation Discovery), Bakker was interviewed by Walters about growing up amidst the intense criticism that followed the fall of his famous father.

== See also ==
- Heritage USA
