= Willowdale, Kansas =

Unincorporated community in Kingman County, Kansas

- Unincorporated community
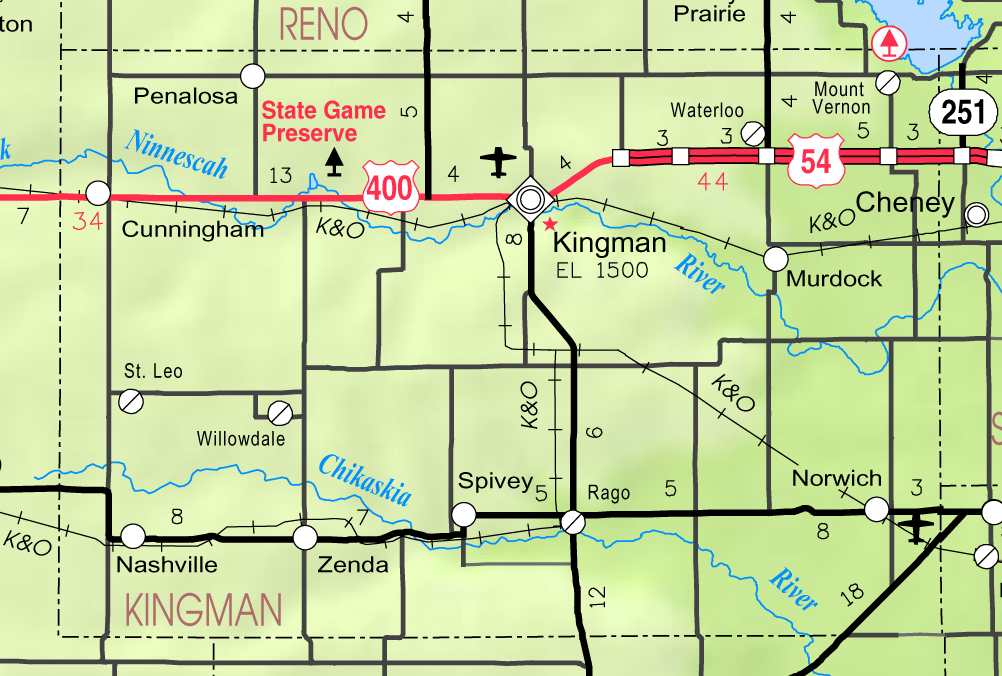
- KDOT map of Kingman County (legend)

- Location within Kansas Location within the United States
- Coordinates: 37°30′55″N 98°18′6″W
- Country: United States
- State: Kansas
- County: Kingman
- Elevation: 1,670 ft (510 m)
- Time zone: UTC-6 (CST)
  - Summer (DST): UTC-5 (CDT)
- ZIP Code: 67142
- Area code: 620
- FIPS code: 20-79475
- GNIS ID: 474283

Willowdale is a rural unincorporated community in Kingman County, Kansas, United States. It is located 5 miles north of Zenda at the intersection of SW 100 Ave and SW 90 St.

== History ==
A Baptist church was organized in the community on May 21, 1885. A post office was opened in Willowdale in 1901 and remained in operation until it was discontinued in 1938.

St. Peter Catholic Church is located in Willowdale.

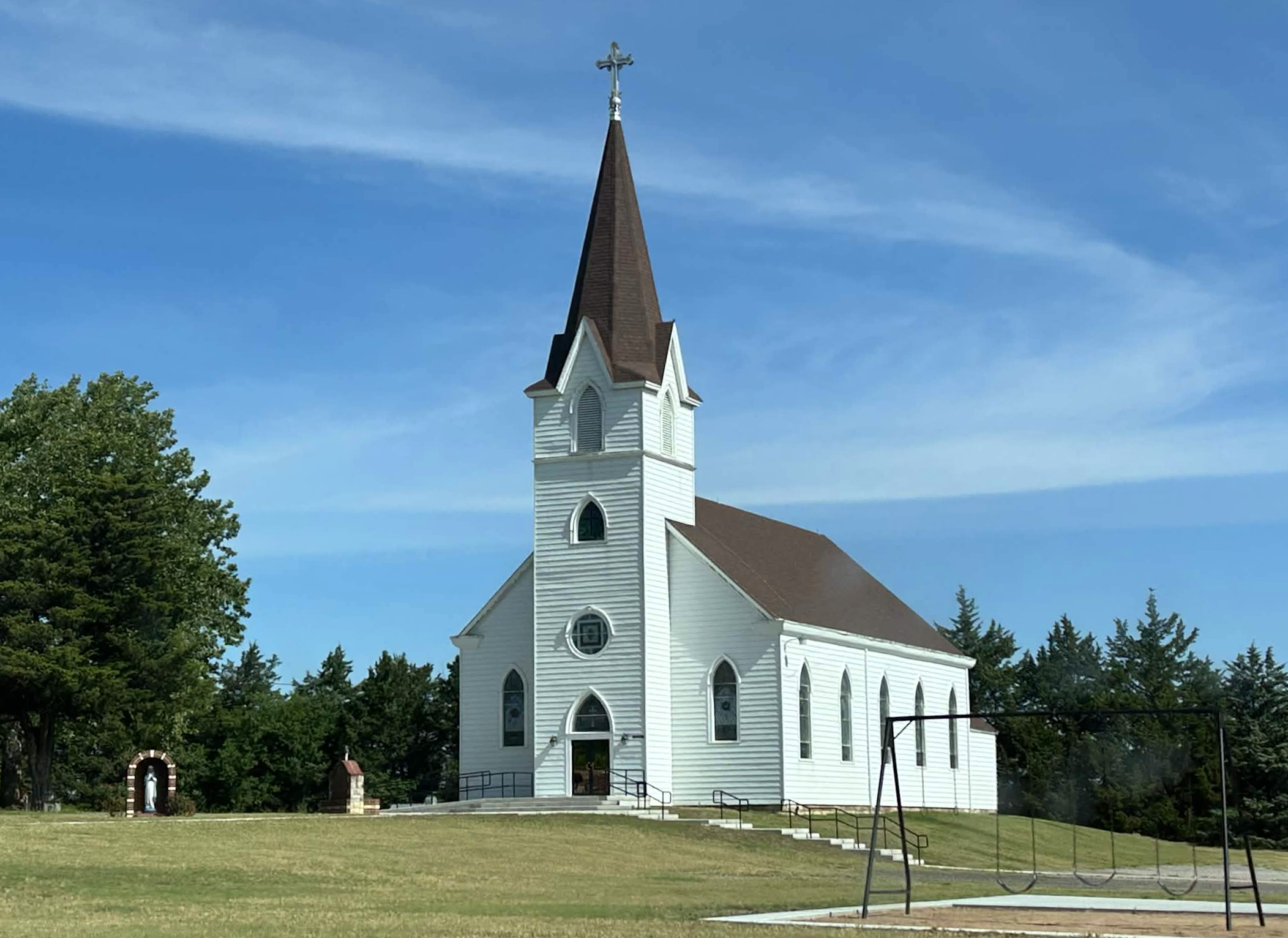
St. Peter Catholic Church in Willowdale

== Education ==
The community is served by Cunningham–West Kingman County USD 332 public school district.
