= Grove Township, Reno County, Kansas =

Township in Reno County, Kansas, U.S.

Grove Township
- Township
- Location within Reno County
- Coordinates: 37.86063°N 98.407595°W
- Country: United States
- State: Kansas
- County: Reno
- Established: 1876

Government
  - District 2 County Commissioner: Ron Hirst

Area
  - Total: 36.111 sq mi (93.53 km^{2})
  - Land: 36.098 sq mi (93.49 km^{2})
  - Water: 0.013 sq mi (0.034 km^{2}) 0.04%

Population (2020)
  - Total: 58
  - Density: 1.6/sq mi (0.62/km^{2})
- Time zone: UTC-6 (CST)
  - Summer (DST): UTC-5 (CDT)
- Area code: 620
- GNIS feature ID: 473608

Grove Township is a township in Reno County, Kansas, United States. As of the 2020 census, its population was 58.

== History ==
The first township in Reno County was Reno Township, which covered the whole county upon its creation in 1872. In 1874, Langdon Township was separated from Reno Township. Grove Township would be split off from Langdon Township in 1876, and in 1878 Bell Township split off from Grove Township.

== Geography ==
Grove Township covers an area of 36.111 square miles (93.53 square kilometers).

=== Adjacent townships ===
Sylvia Township, Reno County
Fairview Township, Stafford County	northwest	north	northeast	Plevna Township, Reno County
York Township, Stafford County	west	self	east	Langdon Township, Reno County
Township 6, Pratt County	southwest	south
Miami Township, Reno County

== Transportation ==
=== Major highways ===
- K-61
