= Tammy Faye Bakker =

American evangelical and singer (1942–2007)

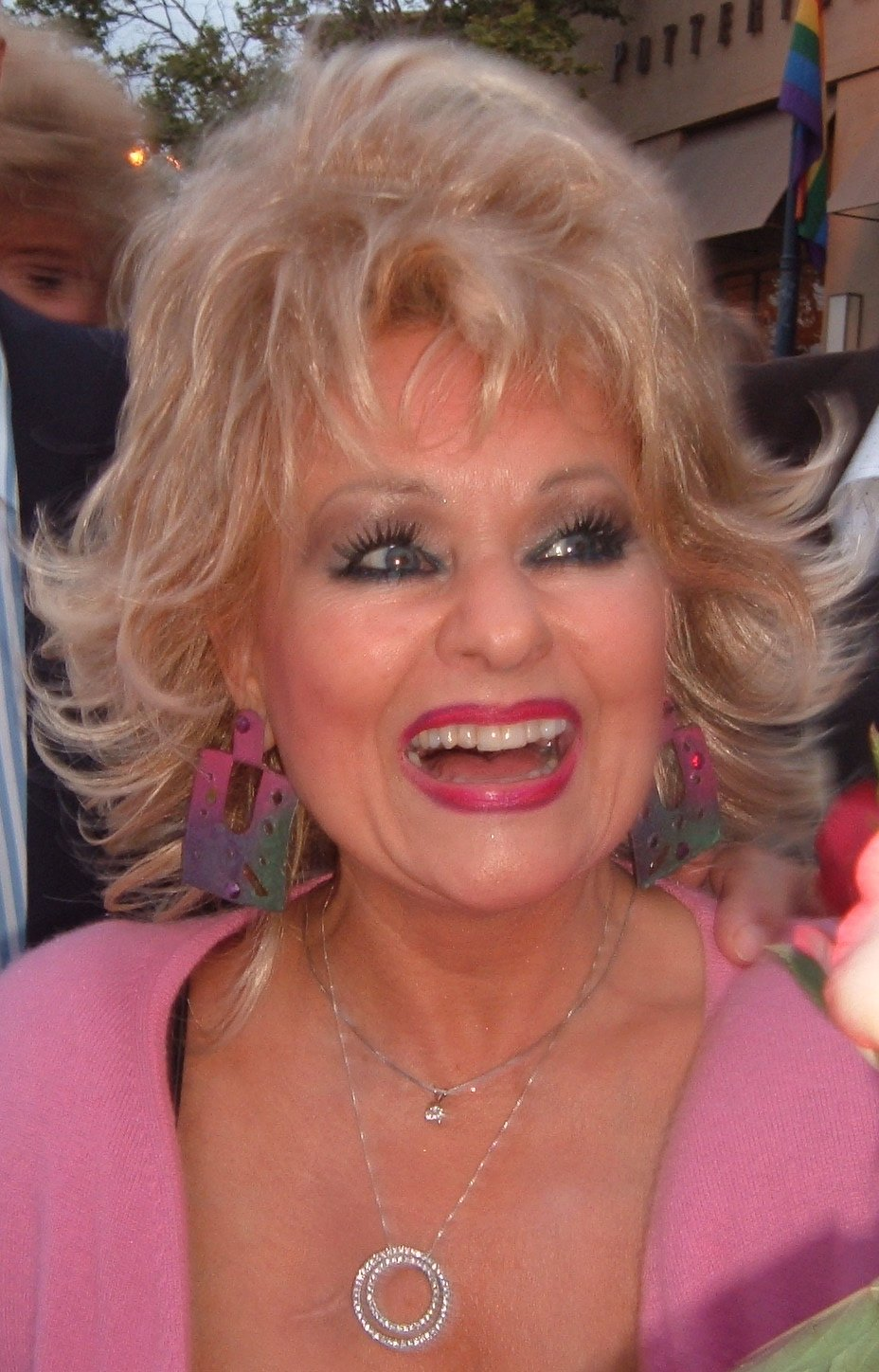
- Messner in 2004
- Born: Tamara Faye LaValley; March 7, 1942; International Falls, Minnesota, U.S.
- Died: July 20, 2007 (aged 65); Loch Lloyd, Missouri, U.S.
- Resting place: Waldron Cemetery, Waldron, Kansas
- Other name: Tammy Faye Messner
- Education: North Central Bible College (did not graduate)
- Occupations: Evangelist; singer; entrepreneur; author; television personality
- Years active: 1962–2007
- Spouses: Jim Bakker (m. 1961; div. 1992); Roe Messner (m. 1993)
- Children: 2, including Jay

Tamara Faye Messner (previously Bakker, née LaValley; March 7, 1942 – July 20, 2007) was an American evangelist. She co-founded the televangelist program The PTL Club with her then-husband Jim Bakker in 1974. They had hosted a puppet-show in local television programming, in the early 1960s; she also had a career as a recording artist. In 1978, she and Jim Bakker built Heritage USA, a Christian theme park.

During her career she was noted for her eccentric and glamorous persona, as well as for moral views that diverged from those of many mainstream evangelists, particularly her advocacy for LGBT persons and reaching out to HIV/AIDS patients at the height of the AIDS epidemic. She released three autobiographies during her lifetime, I Gotta Be Me in 1978, Tammy: Telling It My Way in 1996, and I Will Survive and You Will Too! in 2003.

Jim Bakker was exposed for sexual and financial misconduct and was indicted, convicted, and imprisoned on numerous counts of fraud and conspiracy in 1989, resulting in the dissolution of The PTL Club and the closure of Heritage USA. She supported Bakker throughout his trial but divorced him while he was in prison in 1992 and married Roe Messner, a church property developer who had built Heritage USA and had been involved in Jim Bakker's payment of hush money to cover up the sex scandal. Roe Messner was then convicted of bankruptcy fraud a few years later in 1996. She was diagnosed with colon cancer in 1996, from which she suffered intermittently for over a decade before dying of the disease in 2007.

== Biography ==
=== 1942–1959: Early life ===
Tamara Faye LaValley was born in International Falls, Minnesota, to Pentecostal preachers Rachel Minnie (née Fairchild; 1919–1992) and Carl Oliver LaValley, who married in 1941. Shortly after she was born, a painful divorce soured her mother against ministers, alienating her from the church. Both of her parents remarried, her mother to Fred Willard Grover, forming a large blended family, in which she was the eldest child.

=== 1960–1973: Marriage to Jim Bakker; early work ===
In 1960, LaValley met Jim Bakker while they were students at North Central Bible College in Minneapolis, Minnesota. LaValley worked in a boutique for a time while Bakker found work in a restaurant inside a department store in Minneapolis. They were married on April 1, 1961. The next year, they moved to South Carolina, where they began their ministry together, initially traveling around the United States; Jim Bakker preached, while Tammy Faye sang songs and played the accordion. In 1970, she gave birth to their daughter Tammy Sue "Sissy" Bakker, and in 1975 gave birth to their son Jamie Charles Bakker.

Jim and Tammy Faye Bakker had been involved with television from the time of their departure from Minneapolis until they moved to the Charlotte area via Virginia Beach, Virginia, where they were founding members of The 700 Club. While in Portsmouth, they were hosts of the popular children's show Jim and Tammy. They then created a puppet ministry for children on Pat Robertson's Christian Broadcasting Network (CBN), which ran from 1964 to 1973.

=== 1974–1987: The PTL Club ===
Jim and Tammy Faye Bakker co-founded The PTL Club (Praise The Lord) in 1974, a televangelist Christian news program that they initially hosted in an abandoned furniture store in Charlotte. The series mixed "glitzy entertainment with down-home family values" and preached a "prosperity gospel", which put a divine seal of approval on both the growing affluence of American evangelicals and the showy lifestyles of their television ministers." The PTL Club soon grew into its own network and a corporate enterprise within a year of its founding, generating $120 million annually in the 1970s. In 1978, the Bakkers used $200 million of PTL funds to build Heritage USA, a Christian retreat and theme park that, at the time, ranked alongside Disney World and Disneyland as one of the most popular theme parks in the United States.

Throughout the series, Tammy Faye Bakker provided a sentimental and emotive touch to stories, and also often sang Christian songs. She was also noted for her candid discussion of topics considered taboo amongst many of her Evangelist peers, ranging from penile implants to acceptance and compassion for the LGBT community.

At the height of the AIDS epidemic in the mid-1980s, she conducted an emotional interview with Steven Pieters, a gay Christian minister with AIDS on "Tammy's House Party," a segment of The PTL Club, during which they discussed his sexuality, coming out, diagnosis with AIDS, and the death of his partner. During the program, Bakker addressed her viewership, saying: "How sad that we as Christians, who are to be the salt of the earth, we who are supposed to be able to love everyone, are afraid so badly of an AIDS patient that we will not go up and put our arm around them and tell them that we care." Throughout the AIDS epidemic, she advocated for viewers of The PTL Club to follow Christ and show compassion and pray for the ill, and also invited drug addicts onto the show to interview them about substance abuse. In 1987, it was reported that Bakker was herself being treated for a prescription drug addiction.

Bakker's friend, the Reverend Mel White, commented on her presence on The PTL Club:

Her fans were people who grew up in a very fundamentalist tradition, not being able to wear make-up, or dance, or go out in public. So here comes Tammy, with her dyed hair and make-up, her ebullient spirit and outspoken ways with both men and women. She talked about sex, and flirted with Jimmy. She took on the caricature of an obedient wife, and blasted it. You have never seen Pat Robertson's wife, or Jerry Falwell's wife. They stay at home, doing what those wives do.

=== 1988–1995: Collapse of The PTL Club and aftermath ===
The Bakkers' control of PTL collapsed in 1987 after revelations that $287,000 had been paid from the organization to buy the silence of Jessica Hahn, who claims Jim Bakker raped her. In his 1997 book, I Was Wrong, Jim Bakker disputed Hahn's account, claiming that he was "set up" and that their sex was consensual. The revelations invited scrutiny of the Bakkers, and charges made about their opulent lives, including media reports of an air-conditioned doghouse at their Tega Cay, South Carolina, lakefront parsonage as well as gold-plated bathroom fixtures, dominated newscasts in the 1980s. When asked about her income, Tammy Faye told reporters in 1986: "We don't get what Johnny Carson makes, and we work a lot harder than him." The couple's Tega Cay home was later sold by the ministry and burned to the ground not long thereafter. Jim wrote in his book I Was Wrong that he watched the home burn on live television while incarcerated. The Charlotte Observer subsequently ran exposés of PTL's finances and management practices. PTL went bankrupt after being taken over by Lynchburg, Virginia-based Baptist televangelist Jerry Falwell, who offered to step in following the scandals in 1988.

Tammy Faye Bakker stood by her husband through the scandal, including several instances when she cried on camera. In 1989, Jim Bakker was sentenced to 45 years in prison on 24 fraud and conspiracy counts (he served five). In 1992, while Jim Bakker was in prison, Tammy Faye filed for divorce, saying in a letter to the New Covenant Church in Orlando, Florida: "For years I have been pretending that everything is all right, when in fact I hurt all the time... I cannot pretend anymore."

On October 3, 1993, she married property developer Roe Messner in Rancho Mirage, California, after he divorced his first wife. They moved to the Charlotte suburb of Matthews, North Carolina. Roe, who had a contracting business, Messner Enterprises in Andover, Kansas, had built much of Heritage USA as well as many large churches and had been a family friend to the Bakkers throughout the PTL years. Roe was the one who produced the money for the $265,000 payment to Hahn, later billing PTL for work never completed on the Jerusalem Amphitheater at Heritage USA. In the Bakkers' fraud trial, Roe Messner testified for Bakker's defense, saying that Bakker had no knowledge of the payment to Jessica Hahn, and that Falwell had sent him to the Bakker home in Palm Springs, California, to offer generous compensation "if he kept his mouth shut."

=== 1996–2007: Later life and illness ===
In 1996, Roe Messner was convicted of bankruptcy fraud, having claimed to owe nearly $30 million to over 300 creditors in 1990. As he faced sentencing in 1996, he said he could not afford to treat his prostate cancer because he lacked health insurance. He was sentenced to and served 27 months in prison.

With her first husband fresh out of jail and her current partner now serving his sentence, Tammy Faye was diagnosed with colon cancer in 1996, and she re-entered the public eye in a series of books, movies, and television appearances. That year she published her autobiography, Tammy: Telling It My Way, and co-hosted a TV talk show titled The Jim J. and Tammy Faye Show with Jim J. Bullock.

She appeared twice on The Drew Carey Show in 1996 and 1999, playing the mother of character Mimi Bobeck (Kathy Kinney), who was also known for wearing excessive amounts of makeup. On September 11, 2003, Messner published a new autobiography, I Will Survive... and You Will, Too!, in which she described her battles with cancer and her life with Roe Messner.

She was the subject of a documentary titled The Eyes of Tammy Faye (2000), narrated by RuPaul, and a follow-up film titled Tammy Faye: Death Defying (2004).

Despite her background in Christian fundamentalism, Messner became a gay icon after parting from PTL, appearing in Gay Pride marches with figures such as Lady Bunny and Bruce Vilanch. Unlike many American Christian fundamentalists, she "had long refused to denounce homosexuals" and publicly expressed compassion toward, and urged support for Americans with HIV/AIDS when it was still a much-feared and unknown disease. She was benevolently referred to as "the ultimate drag queen," and said in her last interview with Larry King that, "When I went – when we lost everything, it was the gay people that came to my rescue, and I will always love them for that."

In early 2004, she appeared on the second season of the VH1 reality television series The Surreal Life. The show chronicled a twelve-day period wherein she, Ron Jeremy, Vanilla Ice, Traci Bingham, Erik Estrada, and Trishelle Cannatella lived together in a Los Angeles house and were assigned various tasks and activities. Together, the six put on a children's play and managed a restaurant for a day. She also attended a book signing for her best-seller, I Will Survive... And You Will Too.

At the end of the show, Messner said she thought of Vanilla Ice and Trishelle Cannatella as her children and could relate to them deeply because she had similar feelings and problems when she was their age.

In July 2007, on more solid financial footing, the Messners relocated to Loch Lloyd, Missouri, a suburb of Kansas City. Jim Bakker had relocated his operations to Branson, Missouri, in 2003. She told Entertainment Tonight they had moved to the "dream house" to be closer to Roe's children and grandchildren from his first marriage.

== Death ==
Messner's 11 years with cancer were highly publicized. She was first diagnosed with colon cancer in March 1996, but later revealed she had endured bleeding for a year out of embarrassment at the prospect of seeing a male doctor. The disease went into remission by the end of that year.

In March 2004, Messner made an appearance on Larry King Live and announced that she had inoperable lung cancer and would soon begin chemotherapy. She continued to receive chemotherapy throughout mid-2004. In November 2004, also on Larry King Live, she announced that she was cancer-free once again. She described the details of her chemotherapy and continued to appear regularly on King's show.

A television documentary of her struggle with cancer was produced in 2004. It was on King's program again that she announced in July 2005 that her cancer had returned. In a March 2006 appearance on the show, she said she was continuing to suffer from lung cancer, which had reached stage 4, and that she was continuing to receive treatment for it. She also mentioned having difficulty swallowing food, suffering from panic attacks, and enduring substantial weight loss. As her health continued to worsen, a "Talk of the Town" article in an October 2006 issue of The New Yorker stated that she was dying in hospice care, and a December 2006 article in Walter Scott's column in Parade reported that her son Jay was "at a North Carolina hospice with his mom, [who is] gravely ill with colon cancer".

Messner was a guest by phone on Larry King Live in December 2006, and said that she was receiving hospice care in her home. She appeared in her son Jay's documentary series One Punk Under God, wherein they talked about her cancer treatments. In one episode, she required the use of oxygen in order to talk.

In May 2007, she issued a statement on her website saying that chemotherapy had stopped, and she urged her fans to continue to pray for her. The story was reported on NBC's The Today Show, and a feature in which fans and well-wishers could post get-well messages to Tammy was added to her website.

On July 18, 2007, Messner made her final appearance on Larry King Live. At the time, she said she weighed 65 pounds (29.5 kg) and was unable to eat solid food. Messner's husband later said that he believed she chose to do the interview to say a final goodbye to her fans.

Two days later, on July 20, 2007, Messner died at her home in Loch Lloyd, near Kansas City, Missouri, after an eleven-year bout with cancer. She was 65 years old. A family service was held on the morning of July 21, at the Messner family plot in Waldron, Kansas. The ceremony was officiated by Rev. Randy McCain, the pastor of Open Door Community Church in Sherwood, Arkansas. According to CNN, the family requested that King officially report the news of her death. Her remains were cremated and her ashes were returned to Waldron Cemetery where they were subsequently buried.

== In popular culture ==
Frank Zappa's song "Jesus Thinks You're a Jerk", from his 1988 album Broadway the Hard Way, is about Tammy Faye and Jim Bakker, as well as Pat Robertson.

Crowded House's song Chocolate Cake from their 1991 album Woodface has multiple lyrical references to Tammy Bakker.

In June 2006, a stage musical titled The Gospel According to Tammy Faye opened at the Cincinnati Fringe Festival and was subsequently developed as a larger professional production. The show features songs by J. T. Buck and a book by Fernando Dovalina. The musical is described as a fantasia which takes a balanced and fair look at its subject. The impetus for the show was provided by a lengthy interview that Messner gave the authors in March 2005. The musical aired in August 2006 in Portland, Oregon and Hood River, Oregon, and it was presented on stage at Houston's Alley Theatre at the end of July 2007 under direction of Les R. Wood. Industry readings presented by the Columbia Gorge Repertory Company were held at the Manhattan Theatre Club in December 2007, the cast including Tony nominee Sally Mayes and veteran Broadway performers William Youmans, Ken Land, Julie Foldesi, James T. Lane and Heather Parcells. The readings were directed by Mindy Cooper. Seth Farber provided musical direction.

Another musical following her life, titled Big Tent, debuted in May 2007, at off-Broadway's New World Stages, in New York City. The show features music and lyrics by Ben Cohn and Sean McDaniel, a book by Jeffery Self, and direction by Ryan J. Davis. A star-studded concert of songs from the show opened in February 2008, at New York's Metropolitan Room.

Tammy Faye's Final Audition, a play about her final hours by Merri Biechler, premiered at the Cincinnati Fringe Festival in June 2015. The play takes place in a fevered dream at the end of her life, wherein she enlists the men in her life for one final TV talk show audition.

A musical about the life of BeBe Winans, Born for This, debuted on June 25, 2018, at the Emerson Cutler Majestic Theatre in Boston, Massachusetts. Tammy Faye and Jim Bakker appear as supporting characters who give BeBe and his sister CeCe their first big break as singers on The PTL Club.

At one time, Broadway actress Kristin Chenoweth was planning a musical based on Messner's life.

In the 2021 movie The Eyes of Tammy Faye, based on the 2000 documentary of the same name, Jessica Chastain plays Tammy Faye, with Andrew Garfield as Jim. The Eyes of Tammy Faye opened on September 17, 2021. Chastain won a Critics Choice Award, a Screen Actors Guild Award, and the Academy Award for Best Actress.

British playwright James Graham also wrote the book for a new musical about Tammy Faye, with music by Elton John and lyrics by Jake Shears. The musical, titled Tammy Faye, opened in October 2022 at the Almeida Theatre in London, directed by Rupert Goold.

== Select discography ==
Year	Album	Record label
1969	Songs and Stories	Hymntone Records
1970	Tammy Tammy Tammy	Hymntone Records
1977	Tammy Bakker Sings PTL Club Favorites	New Pax Records
1978	Love Never Gives Up	PAX Musical Productions
1979	We're Blest	PTL Club Records & Tapes
1980	Run Toward the Roar	PTL Club Records & Tapes
1980	The Lord's On My Side	PTL Club Records & Tapes
1982	Tammy Sings... You Can Make It!	PTL Club Records & Tapes
1982	Old Hymns	PTL Club Records & Tapes
1984	In the Upper Room	PTL Club Records & Tapes
1984	Movin' on to Victory	PTL Club Records & Tapes
1985	Don't Give Up!	PTL Club Records & Tapes
1986	Enough is Enough	PTL Club Records & Tapes
1987	The Ballad of Jim & Tammy (single)	Sutra Records
1988	Peace in the Midst of the Storm	Wooded Lake Productions
1991	Love, Tammy	Jim and Tammy Ministries
1996	Favorite Songs of Inspiration	Inphomation Communications, Inc.

== Books ==
- I Gotta Be Me (1978), ISBN 978-0089221480
- Run to the Roar (1985), ISBN 978-0892210732
- Tammy: Telling It My Way (1996), ISBN 9780679445159
- I Will Survive...and You Will Too! (2003), ISBN 9781585422425
