= Zenda, Kansas =

City in Kingman County, Kansas

- City
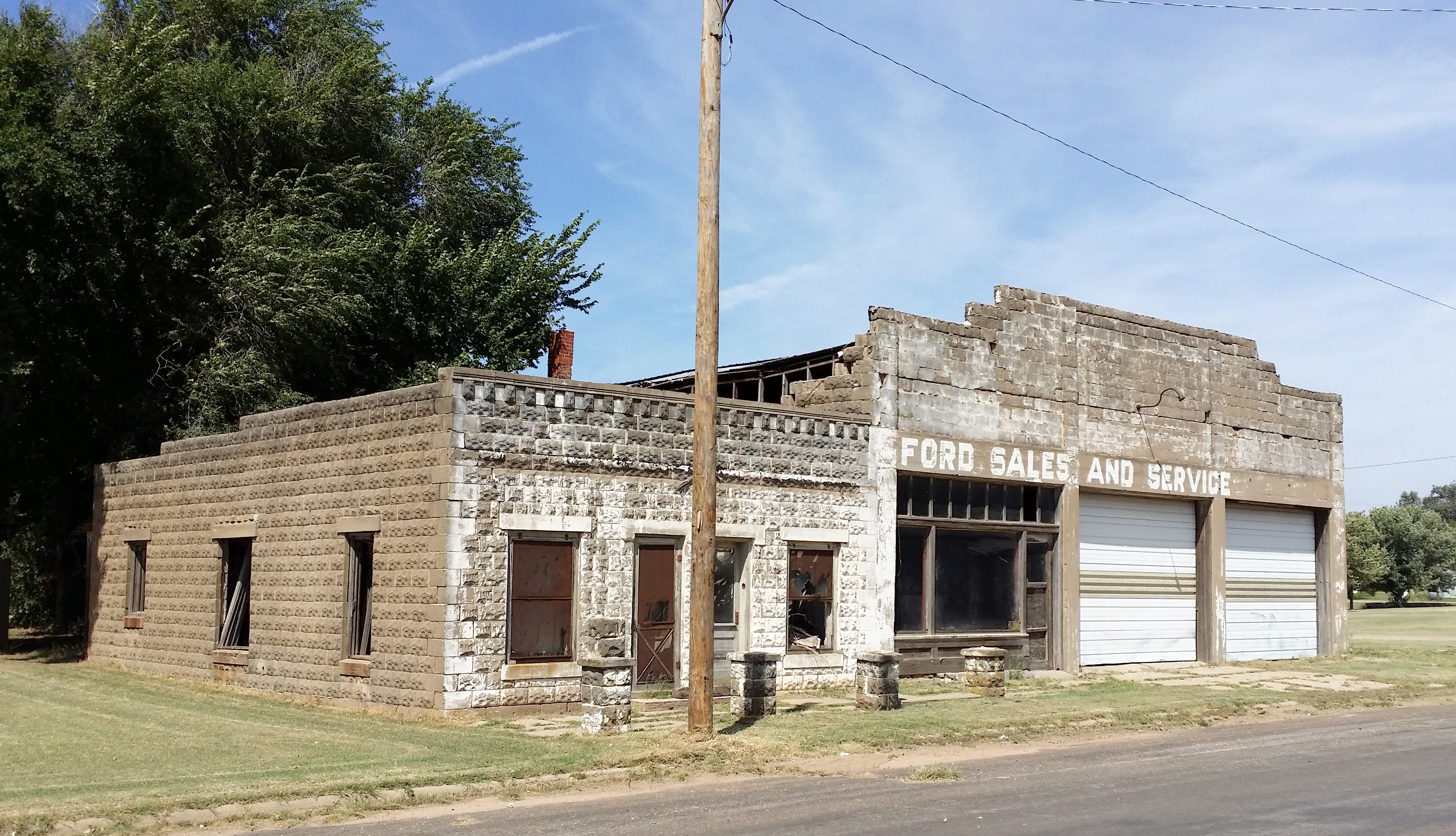
- An abandoned Ford dealership in Zenda

- Location within Kingman County and Kansas

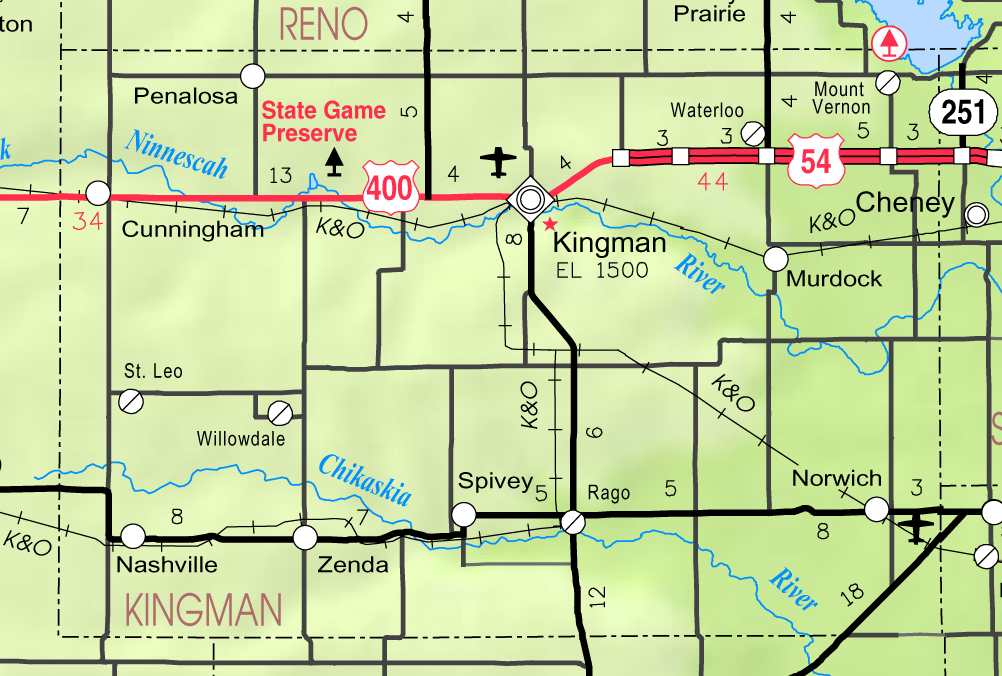
- KDOT map of Kingman County (legend)
- Coordinates: 37°26′39″N 98°16′55″W
- Country: United States
- State: Kansas
- County: Kingman
- Founded: 1887
- Incorporated: 1913
- Named for: The Prisoner of Zenda

Area
  - Total: 0.22 sq mi (0.58 km^{2})
  - Land: 0.22 sq mi (0.58 km^{2})
  - Water: 0 sq mi (0.00 km^{2})
- Elevation: 1,670 ft (510 m)

Population (2020)
  - Total: 72
  - Density: 320/sq mi (120/km^{2})
- Time zone: UTC-6 (CST)
  - Summer (DST): UTC-5 (CDT)
- ZIP Code: 67159
- Area code: 620
- FIPS code: 20-80925
- GNIS ID: 2397400

Zenda is a city in Kingman County, Kansas, United States. As of the 2020 census, the population of the city was 72.

== History ==
Zenda was named after the novel The Prisoner of Zenda.

== Geography ==
According to the United States Census Bureau, the city has a total area of 0.23 square miles (0.60 km^{2}), all land.

=== Climate ===
The climate in this area is characterized by hot, humid summers and generally mild to cool winters. According to the Köppen Climate Classification system, Zenda has a humid subtropical climate, abbreviated "Cfa" on climate maps.

== Demographics ==
Historical population
Census	Pop.	Note	%±
1920	188		—
1930	223		18.6%
1940	252		13.0%
1950	226		−10.3%
1960	157		−30.5%
1970	142		−9.6%
1980	146		2.8%
1990	96		−34.2%
2000	123		28.1%
2010	90		−26.8%
2020	72		−20.0%
U.S. Decennial Census

Former Atchison, Topeka and Santa Fe Railway depot in 1931

=== 2010 census ===
As of the census of 2010, there were 90 people, 44 households, and 24 families residing in the city. The population density was 391.3 inhabitants per square mile (151.1/km^{2}). There were 55 housing units at an average density of 239.1 per square mile (92.3/km^{2}). The racial makeup of the city was 100.0% White. Hispanic or Latino of any race were 7.8% of the population.

There were 44 households, of which 18.2% had children under the age of 18 living with them, 43.2% were married couples living together, 11.4% had a female householder with no husband present, and 45.5% were non-families. 40.9% of all households were made up of individuals, and 22.7% had someone living alone who was 65 years of age or older. The average household size was 2.05 and the average family size was 2.71.

The median age in the city was 52.3 years. 15.6% of residents were under the age of 18; 5.4% were between the ages of 18 and 24; 14.3% were from 25 to 44; 44.4% were from 45 to 64; and 20% were 65 years of age or older. The gender makeup of the city was 46.7% male and 53.3% female.

=== 2000 census ===
As of the census of 2000, there were 123 people, 53 households, and 34 families residing in the city. The population density was 543.9 inhabitants per square mile (210.0/km^{2}). There were 60 housing units at an average density of 265.3 per square mile (102.4/km^{2}). The racial makeup of the city was 92.68% White, 4.88% from other races, and 2.44% from two or more races. Hispanic or Latino of any race were 5.69% of the population.

There were 53 households, out of which 18.9% had children under the age of 18 living with them, 56.6% were married couples living together, 5.7% had a female householder with no husband present, and 35.8% were non-families. 34.0% of all households were made up of individuals, and 15.1% had someone living alone who was 65 years of age or older. The average household size was 2.32 and the average family size was 2.97.

In the city, the population was spread out, with 22.8% under the age of 18, 6.5% from 18 to 24, 23.6% from 25 to 44, 27.6% from 45 to 64, and 19.5% who were 65 years of age or older. The median age was 44 years. For every 100 females, there were 83.6 males. For every 100 females age 18 and over, there were 97.9 males.

The median income for a household in the city was $32,083, and the median income for a family was $38,125. Males had a median income of $30,313 versus $16,875 for females. The per capita income for the city was $15,287. There were 6.5% of families and 13.4% of the population living below the poverty line, including no under eighteens and 36.4% of those over 64.

== Education ==
The community is served by Cunningham–West Kingman County USD 332 public school district. The Cunningham High School mascot is Cunningham Wildcats.

Nashville and Zenda schools were unified as Nashville-Zenda schools in 1964. The Nashville-Zenda Thunderbirds won the Kansas State High School 8-Man football championship in 1969. The original Zenda High School mascot was Zenda Gorillas.

== Transportation ==
The Atchison, Topeka and Santa Fe Railway formerly provided passenger rail service to Zenda on a line between Wichita and Englewood. Dedicated passenger service was provided until at least 1958, while mixed trains continued until at least 1961. As of 2025, the nearest passenger rail station is located in Hutchinson, where Amtrak's Southwest Chief stops once daily on a route from Chicago to Los Angeles.
