= Ridge Township, Barber County, Kansas =

Ridge Township
- Township
- Location in Barber County
- Coordinates: 37°20′30″N 098°24′01″W
- Country: United States
- State: Kansas
- County: Barber

Area
  - Total: 36.1 sq mi (93.5 km^{2})
  - Land: 36.06 sq mi (93.39 km^{2})
  - Water: 0.042 sq mi (0.11 km^{2}) 0.12%
- Elevation: 1,716 ft (523 m)

Population (2000)
  - Total: 4
  - Density: 0/sq mi (0/km^{2})
- GNIS feature ID: 0470456

Ridge Township is a former township in Barber County, Kansas, United States. As of the 2000 census, its population was 4. However, according to the Kansas State Historical Society, the township had already merged into neighboring Sharon Township as of March 22, 1999. It was not included as a separate listing in the 2010 census.

== Geography ==
Ridge Township covers an area of 36.1 square miles (93 km^{2}) and contains no incorporated settlements. According to the USGS, it contains one cemetery, Burgess.
