= Penalosa, Kansas =

City in Kingman County, Kansas

- City
- Location within Kingman County and Kansas

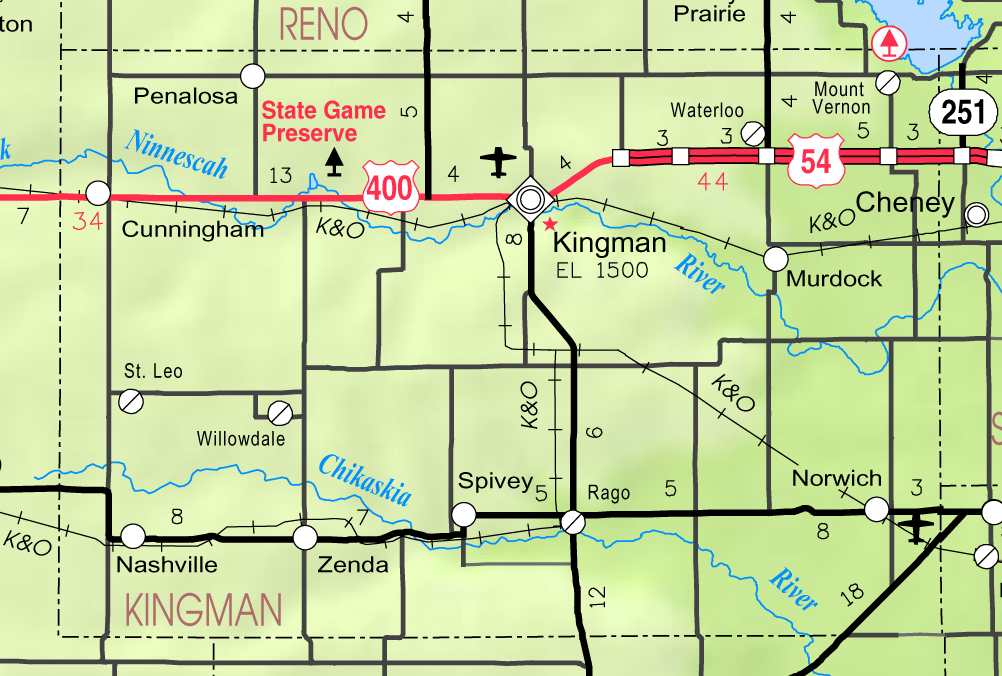
- KDOT map of Kingman County (legend)
- Coordinates: 37°42′56″N 98°19′13″W
- Country: United States
- State: Kansas
- County: Kingman
- Founded: 1880s
- Incorporated: 1929
- Named for: Spanish explorer

Area
  - Total: 0.10 sq mi (0.27 km^{2})
  - Land: 0.10 sq mi (0.27 km^{2})
  - Water: 0 sq mi (0.00 km^{2})
- Elevation: 1,726 ft (526 m)

Population (2020)
  - Total: 18
  - Density: 170/sq mi (67/km^{2})
- Time zone: UTC-6 (CST)
  - Summer (DST): UTC-5 (CDT)
- ZIP Code: 67035
- Area code: 620
- FIPS code: 20-55225
- GNIS ID: 2396176

Penalosa is a city in Kingman County, Kansas, United States. As of the 2020 census, the population of the city was 18.

== History ==
Penalosa was originally known as Lotta, and under the latter name founded about 1885. It was renamed Penalosa in 1887, in honor of a Spanish explorer.

== Geography ==
According to the United States Census Bureau, the city has a total area of 0.07 square miles (0.18 km^{2}), all land.

== Demographics ==
Historical population
Census	Pop.	Note	%±
1930	128		—
1940	118		−7.8%
1950	71		−39.8%
1960	84		18.3%
1970	32		−61.9%
1980	31		−3.1%
1990	21		−32.3%
2000	27		28.6%
2010	17		−37.0%
2020	18		5.9%
U.S. Decennial Census

=== 2010 census ===
At the 2010 census, there were 17 people, 10 households and 5 families living in the city. The population density was 242.9 per square mile (93.8/km^{2}). There were 15 housing units at an average density of 214.3 per square mile (82.7/km^{2}). The racial makeup of the city was 100.0% White.

There were 10 households, of which 10.0% had children under the age of 18 living with them, 40.0% were married couples living together, 10.0% had a female householder with no husband present, and 50.0% were non-families. 40.0% of all households were made up of individuals, and 30% had someone living alone who was 65 years of age or older. The average household size was 1.70 and the average family size was 2.20.

The median age was 55.5 years. 5.9% of residents were under the age of 18; 5.9% were between the ages of 18 and 24; 11.8% were from 25 to 44; 47.1% were from 45 to 64; and 29.4% were 65 years of age or older. The gender makeup was 47.1% male and 52.9% female.

=== 2000 census ===
At the 2000 census there were 27 people, 12 households and 8 families living in the city. The population density was 374.2 inhabitants per square mile (144.5/km^{2}). There were 19 housing units at an average density of 263.4 per square mile (101.7/km^{2}). The racial makeup was 100.00% White.

There were 12 households, of which 8.3% had children under the age of 18 living with them, 58.3% were married couples living together, and 33.3% were non-families. 25.0% of all households were made up of individuals, and 8.3% had someone living alone who was 65 years of age or older. The average household size was 2.25 and the average family size was 2.75.

22.2% of the population were under the age of 18, 14.8% from 25 to 44, 25.9% from 45 to 64, and 37.0% who were 65 years of age or older. The median age was 58 years. For every 100 females, there were 107.7 males. For every 100 females age 18 and over, there were 133.3 males.

The median household income was $25,000 and the median family income was $66,250. Males had a median income of $21,250 and females $41,250. The per capita income was $20,331. There were 20.0% of families and 11.4% of the population living below the poverty line, including no under eighteens and 33.3% of those over 64.

== Education ==
The community is served by Cunningham–West Kingman County USD 332 public school district.
