= Waldron, Kansas =

City in Harper County, Kansas

- City
- Location within Harper County and Kansas

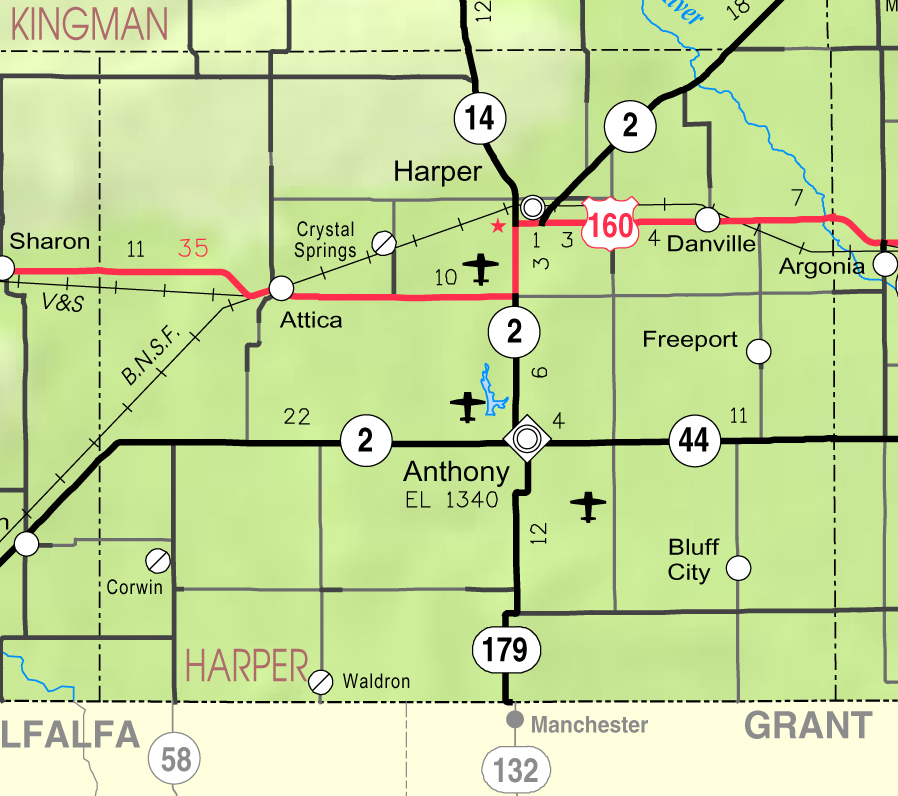
- KDOT map of Harper County (legend)
- Coordinates: 37°00′06″N 98°10′57″W
- Country: United States
- State: Kansas
- County: Harper
- Founded: 1900
- Incorporated: 1908

Area
  - Total: 0.31 sq mi (0.81 km^{2})
  - Land: 0.31 sq mi (0.81 km^{2})
  - Water: 0 sq mi (0.00 km^{2})
- Elevation: 1,253 ft (382 m)

Population (2020)
  - Total: 9
  - Density: 29/sq mi (11/km^{2})
- Time zone: UTC-6 (CST)
  - Summer (DST): UTC-5 (CDT)
- ZIP Code: 67150
- Area code: 620
- FIPS code: 20-74625
- GNIS ID: 2397172

Waldron is a city in Harper County, Kansas, United States. As of the 2020 census, the population of the city was 9. The south edge of the city is the Kansas / Oklahoma state border.

== History ==
Waldron was founded about 1900. The first post office in Waldron was established in 1902. In the 1901-1902 timeframe, Waldron became the point where the rail lines of the Choctaw Northern Railroad and the Kansas City, Mexico and Orient Railway crossed. Both lines through the town were subsequently abandoned.

== Geography ==
According to the United States Census Bureau, the city has a total area of 0.31 square miles (0.80 km^{2}), all land.

== Demographics ==
Historical population
Census	Pop.	Note	%±
1910	262		—
1920	225		−14.1%
1930	182		−19.1%
1940	163		−10.4%
1950	83		−49.1%
1960	38		−54.2%
1970	24		−36.8%
1980	29		20.8%
1990	19		−34.5%
2000	17		−10.5%
2010	11		−35.3%
2020	9		−18.2%
U.S. Decennial Census

=== 2010 census ===
As of the census of 2010, there were 11 people, 7 households, and 3 families residing in the city. The population density was 35.5 inhabitants per square mile (13.7/km^{2}). There were 15 housing units at an average density of 48.4 per square mile (18.7/km^{2}). The racial makeup of the city was 81.8% White and 18.2% from two or more races.

There were 7 households, of which 42.9% were married couples living together and 57.1% were non-families. 57.1% of all households were made up of individuals, and 42.9% had someone living alone who was 65 years of age or older. The average household size was 1.57 and the average family size was 2.33.

The median age in the city was 63.5 years. 0.0% of residents were under the age of 18; 0.0% were between the ages of 18 and 24; 9.1% were from 25 to 44; 45.5% were from 45 to 64; and 45.5% were 65 years of age or older. The gender makeup of the city was 45.5% male and 54.5% female.

=== 2000 census ===
As of the census of 2000, there were 17 people, 10 households, and 5 families residing in the city. The population density was 55.2 inhabitants per square mile (21.3/km^{2}). There were 13 housing units at an average density of 42.2 per square mile (16.3/km^{2}). The racial makeup of the city was 88.24% White and 11.76% Native American.

There were 10 households, out of which none had children under the age of 18 living with them, 50.0% were married couples living together, and 50.0% were non-families. 50.0% of all households were made up of individuals, and 40.0% had someone living alone who was 65 years of age or older. The average household size was 1.70 and the average family size was 2.40.

In the city, the population was spread out, with 35.3% from 45 to 64, and 64.7% who were 65 years of age or older. The median age was 76 years. For every 100 females, there were 70.0 males. For every 100 females age 18 and over, there were 70.0 males.

The median income for a household in the city was $11,250, and the median income for a family was $36,250. Males had a median income of $46,250 versus $0 for females. The per capita income for the city was $15,350. There were no families and 28.6% of the population living below the poverty line, including no under eighteens and 44.4% of those over 64.

== Education ==
The community is served by Chaparral USD 361 public school district.

== Notable people ==
- Roe Messner (1935–2025) – building contractor who built more than 1,700 churches. The ashes of his wife, evangelist Tammy Faye Messner, were interred in the Messner family plot in Waldron in 2007.

== External list ==
- Waldron - Directory of Public Officials
- Historic Images of Waldron, Special Photo Collections at Wichita State University Library
