= Nashville, Kansas =

City in Kingman County, Kansas

- City
- Location within Kingman County and Kansas

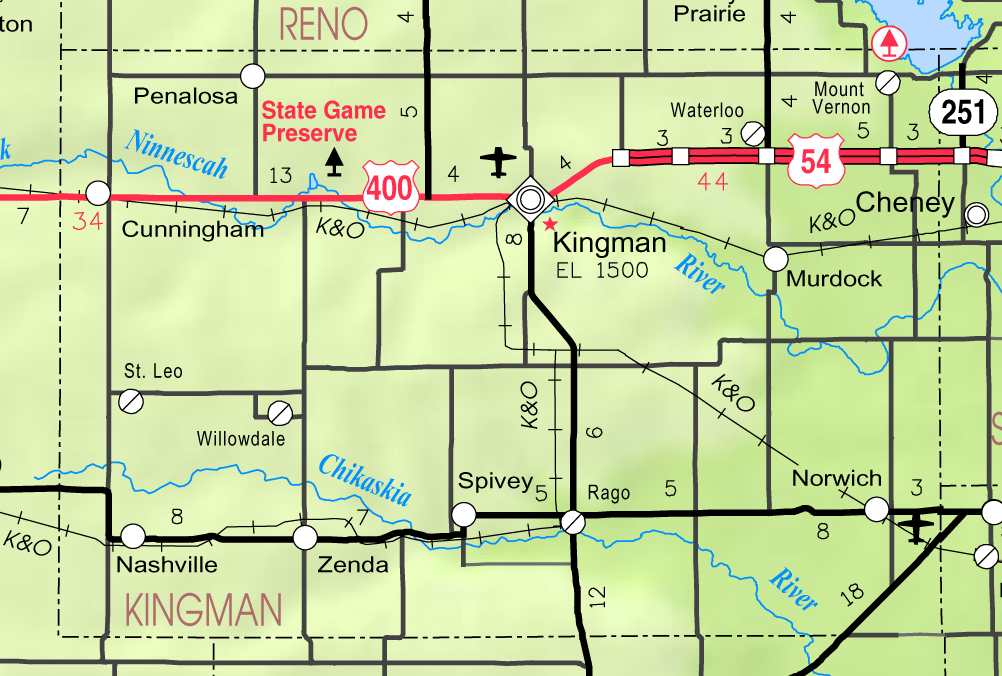
- KDOT map of Kingman County (legend)
- Coordinates: 37°26′22″N 98°25′19″W
- Country: United States
- State: Kansas
- County: Kingman
- Founded: 1888
- Incorporated: 1913
- Named for: Nashville, Tennessee

Area
  - Total: 0.20 sq mi (0.53 km^{2})
  - Land: 0.20 sq mi (0.53 km^{2})
  - Water: 0 sq mi (0.00 km^{2})
- Elevation: 1,742 ft (531 m)

Population (2020)
  - Total: 54
  - Density: 260/sq mi (100/km^{2})
- Time zone: UTC-6 (CST)
  - Summer (DST): UTC-5 (CDT)
- ZIP Code: 67112
- Area code: 620
- FIPS code: 20-49400
- GNIS ID: 2395155

Nashville is a city in Kingman County, Kansas, United States. As of the 2020 census, the population of the city was 54.

== History ==
Nashville was founded about 1888, serving as a station on the Santa Fe Railway. It was named after Nashville, Tennessee. The first post office at Nashville was established in August 1887. The independent newspaper, Nashville Journal was established in 1912 by its editor Clyde Walter, who left Nashville to enlist in the US Army during World War I.

== Geography ==
According to the United States Census Bureau, the city has a total area of 0.22 square miles (0.57 km^{2}), all land.

== Demographics ==
Historical population
Census	Pop.	Note	%±
1930	234		—
1940	212		−9.4%
1950	159		−25.0%
1960	137		−13.8%
1970	107		−21.9%
1980	127		18.7%
1990	118		−7.1%
2000	111		−5.9%
2010	64		−42.3%
2020	54		−15.6%
U.S. Decennial Census

In 1915, the estimated population was 200.

=== 2020 census ===
The 2020 United States census counted 54 people, 33 households, and 18 families in Nashville. The population density was 263.4 per square mile (101.7/km^{2}). There were 50 housing units at an average density of 243.9 per square mile (94.2/km^{2}). The racial makeup was 96.3% (52) white or European American (96.3% non-Hispanic white), 0.0% (0) black or African-American, 0.0% (0) Native American or Alaska Native, 0.0% (0) Asian, 0.0% (0) Pacific Islander or Native Hawaiian, 0.0% (0) from other races, and 3.7% (2) from two or more races. Hispanic or Latino of any race was 0.0% (0) of the population.

Of the 33 households, 21.2% had children under the age of 18; 36.4% were married couples living together; 18.2% had a female householder with no spouse or partner present. 33.3% of households consisted of individuals and 15.2% had someone living alone who was 65 years of age or older. The average household size was 1.8 and the average family size was 2.3. The percent of those with a bachelor's degree or higher was estimated to be 7.4% of the population.

14.8% of the population was under the age of 18, 0.0% from 18 to 24, 18.5% from 25 to 44, 29.6% from 45 to 64, and 37.0% who were 65 years of age or older. The median age was 62.0 years. For every 100 females, there were 74.2 males. For every 100 females ages 18 and older, there were 76.9 males.

=== 2010 census ===
As of the census of 2010, there were 64 people, 39 households, and 19 families living in the city. The population density was 290.9 inhabitants per square mile (112.3/km^{2}). There were 55 housing units at an average density of 250.0 per square mile (96.5/km^{2}). The racial makeup of the city was 98.4% White and 1.6% African American.

There were 39 households, of which 7.7% had children under the age of 18 living with them, 41.0% were married couples living together, 5.1% had a female householder with no husband present, 2.6% had a male householder with no wife present, and 51.3% were non-families. 46.2% of all households were made up of individuals, and 18% had someone living alone who was 65 years of age or older. The average household size was 1.64 and the average family size was 2.21.

The median age in the city was 55 years. 6.2% of residents were under the age of 18; 3.2% were between the ages of 18 and 24; 23.4% were from 25 to 44; 39.1% were from 45 to 64; and 28.1% were 65 years of age or older. The gender makeup of the city was 59.4% male and 40.6% female.

== Education ==
The community is served by Cunningham–West Kingman County USD 332 public school district. The Cunningham High School mascot is Cunningham Wildcats.

Nashville and Zenda schools were unified as Nashville-Zenda schools in 1964. The Nashville-Zenda Thunderbirds won the Kansas State High School 8-Man football championship in 1969.

== Transportation ==
The Atchison, Topeka and Santa Fe Railway formerly provided passenger rail service to Nashville on a line between Wichita and Englewood. Dedicated passenger service was provided until at least 1958, while mixed trains continued until at least 1961. As of 2025, the nearest passenger rail station is located in Hutchinson, where Amtrak's Southwest Chief stops once daily on a route from Chicago to Los Angeles.

== Notable people ==
- Ernest Schmidt (1911–1986), basketball college player, member of the Basketball Hall of Fame
