= Cunningham, Kansas =

City in Kingman County, Kansas

- City
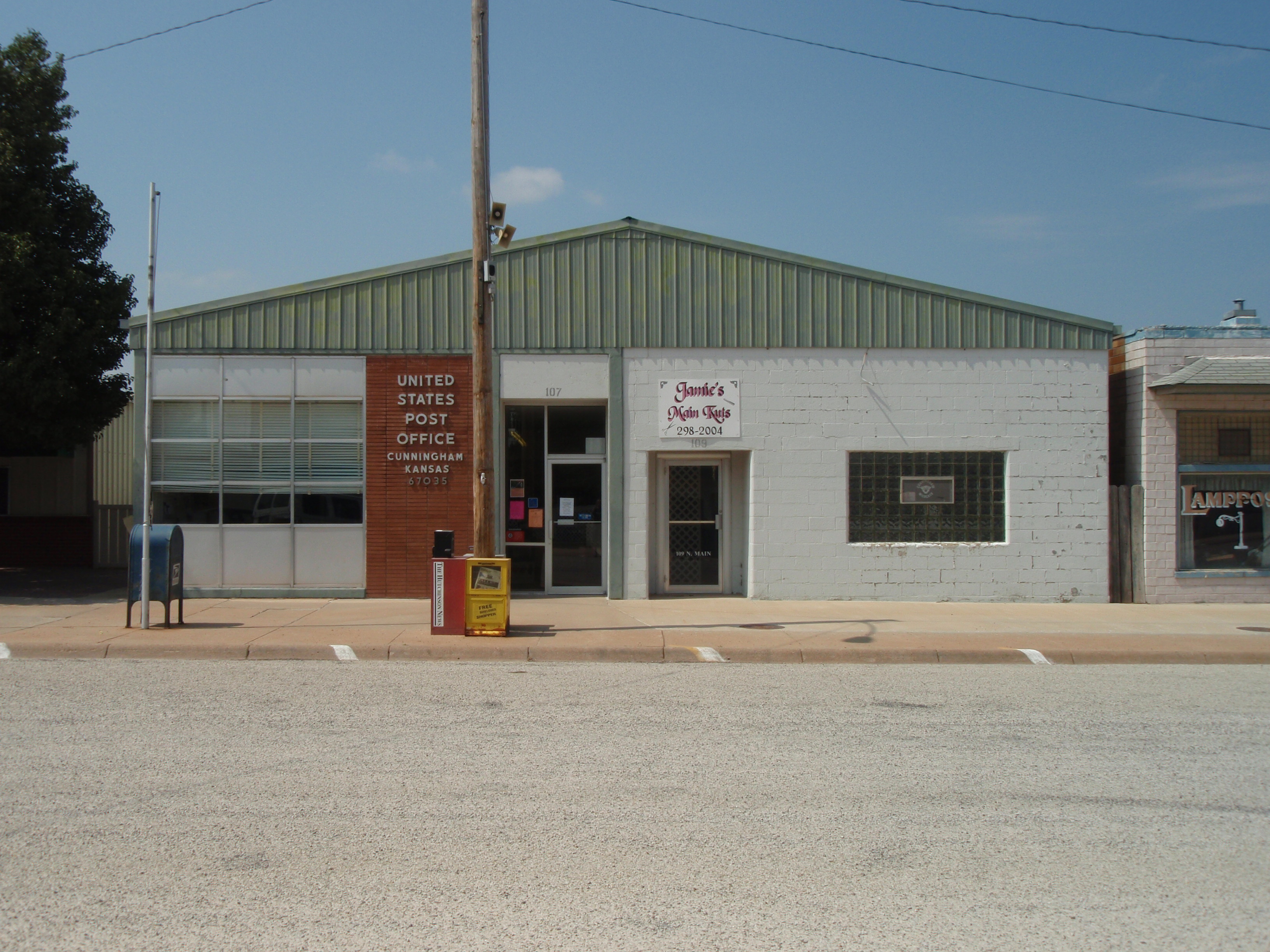
- U.S. Post Office (2009)

- Location within Kingman County and Kansas

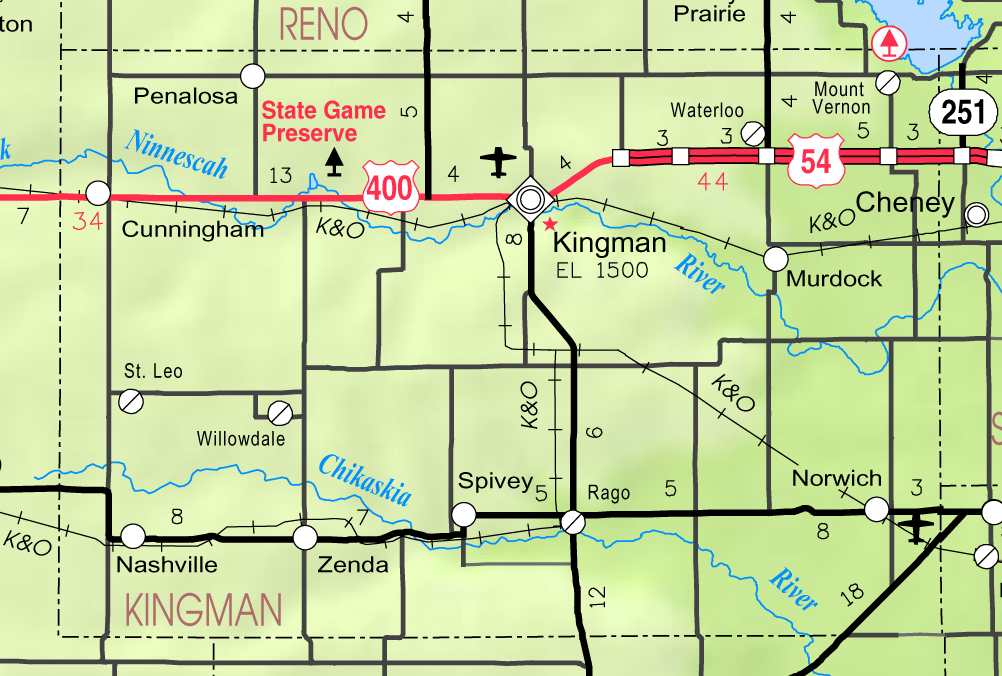
- KDOT map of Kingman County (legend)
- Coordinates: 37°38′41″N 98°25′52″W
- Country: United States
- State: Kansas
- County: Kingman
- Founded: 1880s
- Incorporated: 1908
- Named for: J.D. Cunningham

Area
  - Total: 0.47 sq mi (1.21 km^{2})
  - Land: 0.47 sq mi (1.21 km^{2})
  - Water: 0 sq mi (0.00 km^{2})
- Elevation: 1,709 ft (521 m)

Population (2020)
  - Total: 444
  - Density: 950/sq mi (367/km^{2})
- Time zone: UTC-6 (CST)
  - Summer (DST): UTC-5 (CDT)
- ZIP Code: 67035
- Area code: 620
- FIPS code: 20-16775
- GNIS ID: 2393696
- Website: cunninghamks.net

Cunningham is a city in Kingman County, Kansas, United States. As of the 2020 census, the population of the city was 444. The city was named in honor of J.D. Cunningham, a pioneer settler.

== History ==
The history of Cunningham starts with the town of Ninnescah, which was located near and named after the Ninnescah River. The Ninnescah Post Office opened August 20, 1885. Later the town of Cunningham was established a few miles to the west, on the north side of the railroad. There was a movement among the locals to move the town of Ninnescah to Cunningham. Some buildings were physically moved from Ninnescah to Cunningham in 1887 and 1888. A tornado destroyed most of Ninnescah on March 24, 1888, which sealed its fate.

Cunningham was incorporated as a city in 1908.

== Geography ==
According to the United States Census Bureau, the city has a total area of 0.35 square miles (0.91 km^{2}), all land.

== Demographics ==
Historical population
| Census | Pop. | Note | %± |
|---|---|---|---|
| 1910 | 395 | | — |
| 1920 | 462 | | 17.0% |
| 1930 | 412 | | −10.8% |
| 1940 | 451 | | 9.5% |
| 1950 | 510 | | 13.1% |
| 1960 | 618 | | 21.2% |
| 1970 | 483 | | −21.8% |
| 1980 | 540 | | 11.8% |
| 1990 | 535 | | −0.9% |
| 2000 | 514 | | −3.9% |
| 2010 | 454 | | −11.7% |
| 2020 | 444 | | −2.2% |
U.S. Decennial Census

=== 2020 census ===
The 2020 United States census counted 444 people, 180 households, and 111 families in Cunningham. The population density was 969.4 per square mile (374.3/km^{2}). There were 206 housing units at an average density of 449.8 per square mile (173.7/km^{2}). The racial makeup was 93.47% (415) white or European American (91.44% non-Hispanic white), 0.68% (3) black or African-American, 0.0% (0) Native American or Alaska Native, 0.45% (2) Asian, 0.23% (1) Pacific Islander or Native Hawaiian, 2.25% (10) from other races, and 2.93% (13) from two or more races. Hispanic or Latino of any race was 4.28% (19) of the population.

Of the 180 households, 21.7% had children under the age of 18; 51.7% were married couples living together; 22.2% had a female householder with no spouse or partner present. 33.3% of households consisted of individuals and 21.7% had someone living alone who was 65 years of age or older. The average household size was 2.3 and the average family size was 2.9. The percent of those with a bachelor's degree or higher was estimated to be 20.3% of the population.

19.8% of the population was under the age of 18, 5.0% from 18 to 24, 18.5% from 25 to 44, 24.5% from 45 to 64, and 32.2% who were 65 years of age or older. The median age was 52.3 years. For every 100 females, there were 104.6 males. For every 100 females ages 18 and older, there were 111.9 males.

The 2016–2020 5-year American Community Survey estimates show that the median household income was $53,523 (with a margin of error of +/- $6,742) and the median family income was $65,000 (+/- $14,841). Males had a median income of $37,500 (+/- $8,099) versus $31,875 (+/- $8,837) for females. The median income for those above 16 years old was $35,227 (+/- $5,563). Approximately, 3.6% of families and 5.9% of the population were below the poverty line, including 0.0% of those under the age of 18 and 4.5% of those ages 65 or over.

=== 2010 census ===
As of the census of 2010, there were 454 people, 183 households, and 114 families living in the city. The population density was 1,297.1 inhabitants per square mile (500.8/km^{2}). There were 213 housing units at an average density of 608.6 per square mile (235.0/km^{2}). The racial makeup of the city was 97.4% White, 0.4% African American, 0.9% Native American, 0.4% from other races, and 0.9% from two or more races. Hispanic or Latino of any race were 0.9% of the population.

There were 183 households, of which 22.4% had children under the age of 18 living with them, 51.4% were married couples living together, 8.2% had a female householder with no husband present, 2.7% had a male householder with no wife present, and 37.7% were non-families. 34.4% of all households were made up of individuals, and 19.7% had someone living alone who was 65 years of age or older. The average household size was 2.14 and the average family size was 2.68.

The median age in the city was 50.7 years. 18.1% of residents were under the age of 18; 6% were between the ages of 18 and 24; 17.4% were from 25 to 44; 29.3% were from 45 to 64; and 29.1% were 65 years of age or older. The gender makeup of the city was 46.3% male and 53.7% female.

== Government ==
The Cunningham government consists of a mayor and five council members.

== Education ==
The community is served by Cunningham–West Kingman County USD 332 public school district.

- Cunningham High School
- Cunningham Grade School

The Cunningham Wildcats won the Kansas State High School boys class 1A Track & Field championship in 2008.

=== Library ===
- Cunningham Public Library

== Transportation ==
U.S. Route 54 passes through Cunningham.

The Atchison, Topeka and Santa Fe Railway formerly provided passenger rail service to Cunningham on a line between Wichita and Pratt. Dedicated passenger service was provided until at least 1926, while mixed trains continued until at least 1961. As of 2025, the nearest passenger rail station is located in Hutchinson, where Amtrak's Southwest Chief stops once daily on a route from Chicago to Los Angeles.

== Gallery ==
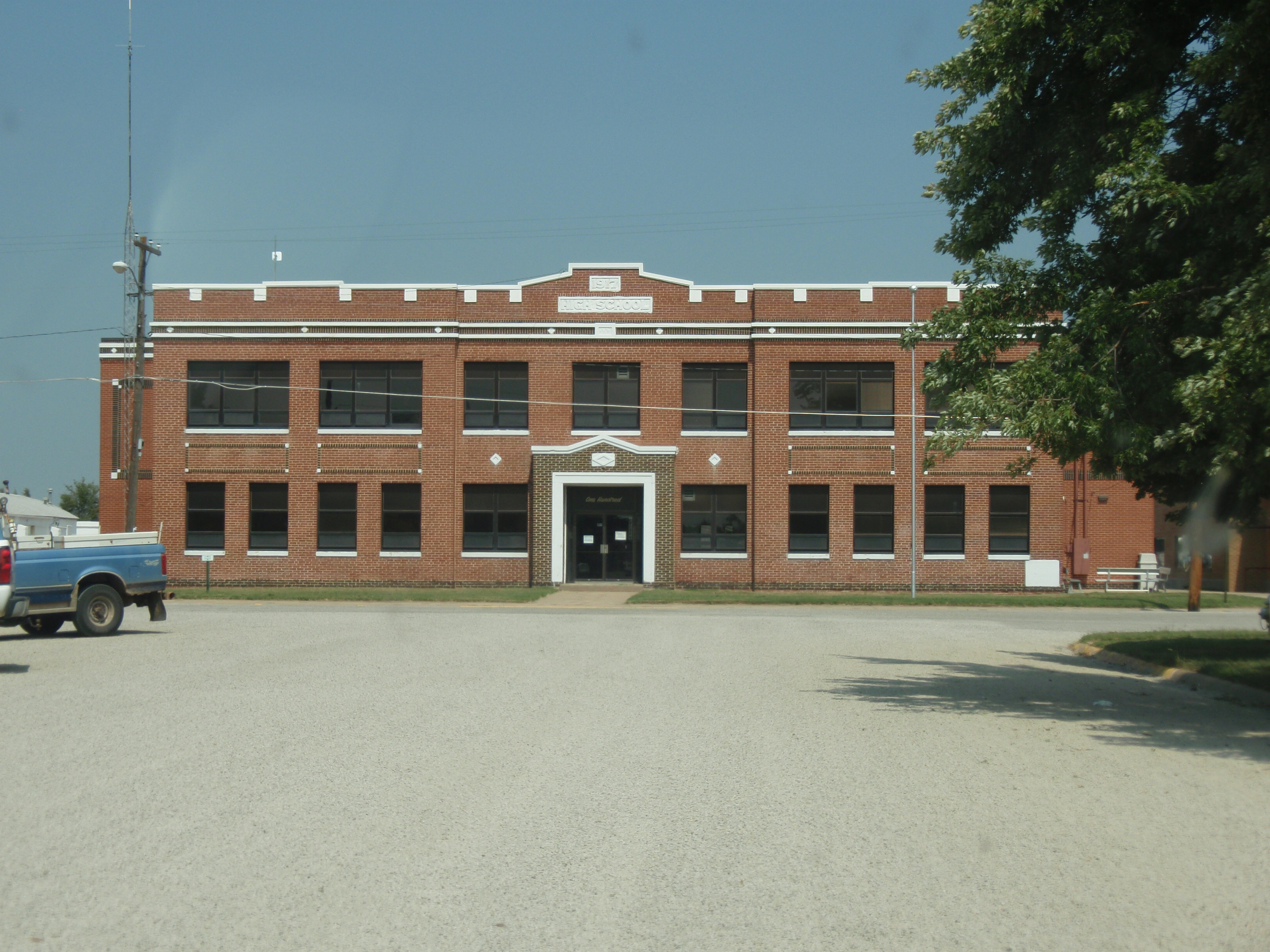
Cunningham High School, 100 West Fourth St (2009)

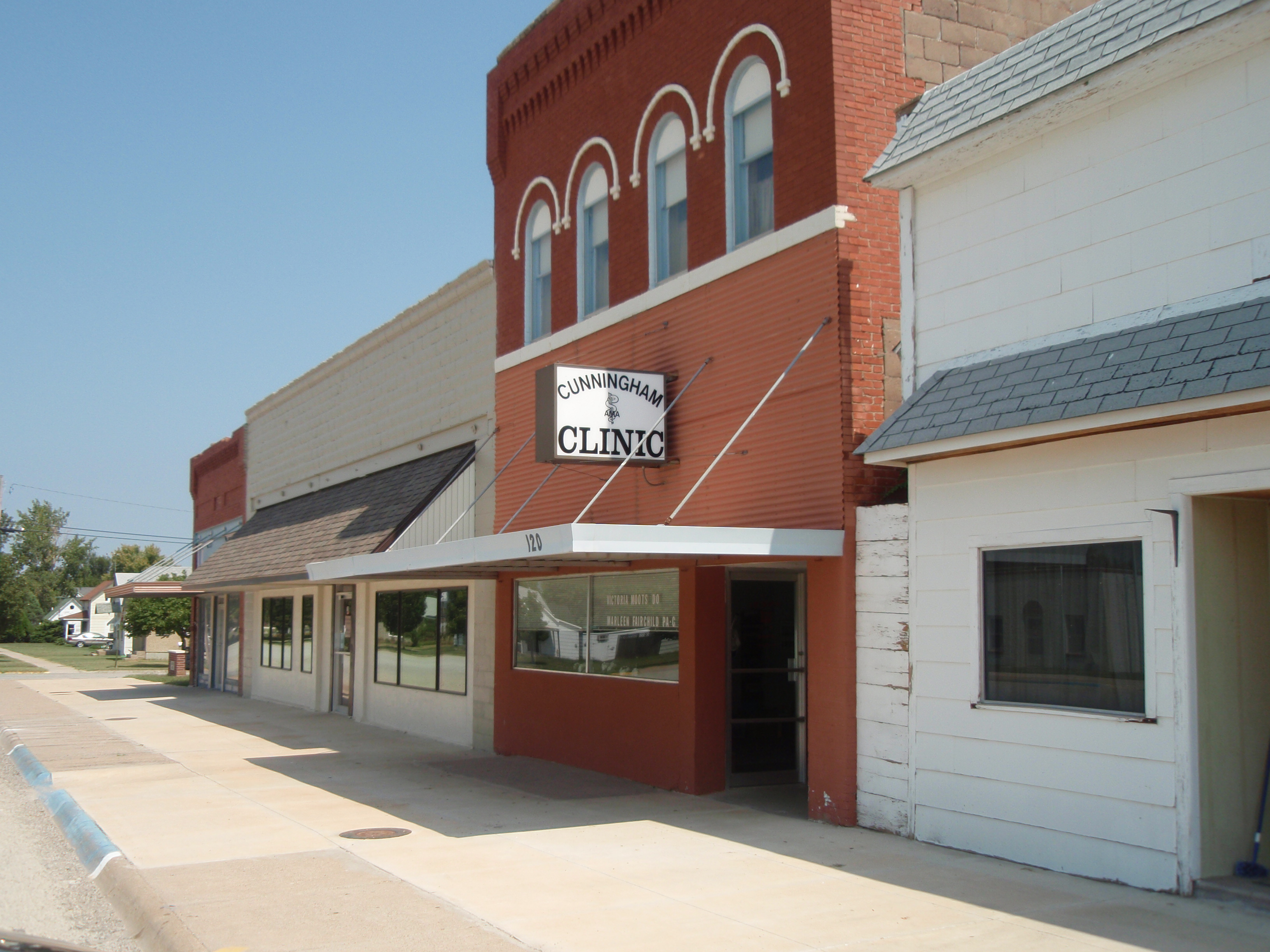
Cunningham Clinic, 120 North Main St (2009)
