= Cole Township, Benton County, Missouri =

Township in Benton County, Missouri, U.S.

Coordinates: 38.3022°N 93.1725°W

Cole Township is a township in Benton County, in the U.S. state of Missouri. Cole Township was formed in February 1835, taking its name from Captain Stephen Cole, an Indian fighter and pioneer settler.

Several streams, including Big Buffalo Creek, Byler Branch, Cole Camp Creek, Duran Creek, Feaster Branch, Lemon Branch, Ross Creek run through this township.
