= List of tornadoes in the outbreak of May 18–21, 2025 =

From May 18–21, 2025, a widespread tornado outbreak took place across the Great Plains and Mid-South of the United States.

== Confirmed tornadoes ==
Confirmed tornadoes by Enhanced Fujita rating
EFU	EF0	EF1	EF2	EF3	EF4	EF5	Total
15	35	60	13	10	0	0	133

=== May 18 event ===
List of confirmed tornadoes – Sunday, May 18, 2025 (Note: All dates are based on the local time zone where the tornado touched down; however, all times are in Coordinated Universal Time for consistency.)
EF#	Location	County / parish	State	Start coord.	Time (UTC)	Path length	Max. width
EF1	Valley Hill to S of McCarley	Carroll	MS	33.5062°N 90.0642°W	08:08–08:29	14.4 mi (23.2 km)	1,100 yd (1,000 m)
EF1	A tornado touched down along US 82 north of the Greenwood–Leflore Airport and tracked east-southeast. Thousands of hardwood and softwood trees were snapped or uprooted, with several falling onto homes, fences, and power lines, leading to widespread outages. Several single-family homes sustained roof damage, and multiple sheds and outbuildings were either destroyed or heavily damaged along the path.						
EF2	NE of Parker	Elbert, Arapahoe	CO	39.5584°N 104.6226°W	19:07–19:12	0.94 mi (1.51 km)	50 yd (46 m)
EF2	This EF2 tornado caused damage to houses and buildings.						
EF1	SW of Bennett	Arapahoe	CO	39.6614°N 104.5519°W	19:23–19:32	2.53 mi (4.07 km)	75 yd (69 m)
EF1	This brief tornado caused roof damage to barns and snapped tree branches.						
EF2	W of Bennett	Arapahoe, Adams	CO	39.7191°N 104.4948°W	19:30–19:46	5.09 mi (8.19 km)	200 yd (180 m)
EF2	This tornado destroyed multiple solar panels and lifted and rolled a pickup truck over 100 yards.						
EF2	NNE of Bennett	Adams	CO	39.7838°N 104.4074°W	19:40–19:55	4.62 mi (7.44 km)	400 yd (370 m)
EF2	This strong tornado caused damage to mobile homes and trees and completely destroyed a barn.						
EFU	SW of Clyde	Callahan	TX	32.3233°N 99.5477°W	22:03–22:10	2.98 mi (4.80 km)	50 yd (46 m)
EFU	A tornado occurred near Lake Clyde.						
EFU	N of Kirk	Yuma	CO	39.6404°N 102.59°W	22:05	0.01 mi (0.016 km)	15 yd (14 m)
EFU	A landspout was photographed.						
EF2	WSW of St. Francis	Cheyenne	KS	39.6978°N 101.9496°W	22:12–22:19	3.94 mi (6.34 km)	200 yd (180 m)
EF2	A tornado formed south of a farmstead, causing minor impacts before moving north-northwest toward US 36. Along its path, it broke power poles, uprooted a large cottonwood tree, and twisted a well-anchored antenna. At another farmstead, the tornado removed the roof and doors from a metal building, displaced a couple of grain bins, and leveled a wooden shed, though it turned away from the house. It continued north through a windbreak before dissipating short of the highway.						
EFU	N of Kanorado	Sherman	KS	39.4394°N 102.0403°W	22:15–22:16	0.07 mi (0.11 km)	50 yd (46 m)
EFU	An off-duty NWS employee reported a brief tornado.						
EF2	NE of Albany	Shackelford	TX	32.7925°N 99.2269°W	22:19–22:24	0.8 mi (1.3 km)	150 yd (140 m)
EF2	A brief but strong tornado damaged several utility poles and trees.						
EF1	S of Higgins, TX	Hemphill (TX), Ellis (OK)	TX, OK	36.0089°N 100.0049°W	22:21–22:27	1.61 mi (2.59 km)	75 yd (69 m)
EF1	A tornado began on the eastern edge of Hemphill County and quickly intensified, damaging several buildings and a home, including partial uplift of the roof deck and damage to siding and shed doors. Several trees were uprooted in the home's yard and a cattle wind break was partially torn from the ground. After crossing into Oklahoma, the tornado snapped tree limbs and caused minor damage before lifting in an open field.						
EF2	N of Scott City	Scott, Logan	KS	38.65°N 100.95°W	22:35–23:04	11.04 mi (17.77 km)	460 yd (420 m)
EF2	This strong tornado began in northern Scott County, damaging trees and completely destroying an outbuilding near the Scott Wildlife Area before continuing north into Logan County. There, it destroyed an oil battery near Little Jerusalem Badlands State Park and damaged items bolted into concrete at the park entrance.						
EF3	WSW of Arnett	Ellis	OK	36.09°N 99.865°W	22:41–22:56	6 mi (9.7 km)	50 yd (46 m)
EF3	An intense tornado began west of Arnett, breaking power poles and damaging trees before moving east-northeast through open country. Although much of the path lacked structures, surveys and drone imagery confirmed a continuous track. Severe tree damage occurred south of local road, where trees were partially debarked and large limbs stripped, leading to the EF3 rating. Near the western edge of Arnett, the tornado displaced a large shipping container by 175 ft (53 m) and caused additional extensive tree damage. It then turned northwest and dissipated just west of the city near US 60.						
EF2	Modoc to NW of Scott City	Scott	KS	38.48°N 101.1°W	22:43–22:55	7.36 mi (11.84 km)	150 yd (140 m)
EF2	A tornado began southwest of Modoc just south of K-96, snapping power poles along the highway. As it tracked northeast, it toppled train cars west of town and damaged a mobile home on the north side of Modoc by ripping off its roof. Moving into open fields, it caused sporadic damage to power lines, a home, and pivot irrigation systems before dissipating.						
EF0	S of Arnett	Ellis	OK	36.099°N 99.778°W	22:56	0.2 mi (0.32 km)	10 yd (9.1 m)
EF0	This anticyclonic, high-end EF0 tornado snapped tree branches, tore the roof off a barn, and overturned farming equipment.						
EF1	NW of Arnett	Ellis	OK	36.147°N 99.787°W	22:58–23:06	3.5 mi (5.6 km)	50 yd (46 m)
EF1	Trees and an oil field building were damaged.						
EFU	NNW of Scott City	Scott	KS	38.6559°N 100.9574°W	23:10	0.25 mi (0.40 km)	25 yd (23 m)
EFU	A brief tornado was observed but no damage was found.						
EF3	W of Gove City to Grinnell	Gove, Sheridan	KS	38.961°N 100.717°W	23:32–00:02	13.33 mi (21.45 km)	416 yd (380 m)
EF3	See section on this tornado						
EF0	NNW of Eastland	Eastland	TX	32.4797°N 98.8565°W	23:47–23:54	3.28 mi (5.28 km)	200 yd (180 m)
EF0	Large tree branches were snapped.						
EF0	WSW of Stratton	Hitchcock	NE	40.1363°N 101.2615°W	23:49–23:50	0.21 mi (0.34 km)	50 yd (46 m)
EF0	A storm chaser observed a satellite tornado to the Stratton EF3 flip an irrigation pivot.						
EF3	WNW of Stratton to SSW of Hamlet	Hitchcock	NE	40.163°N 101.2921°W	23:49–00:15	10.68 mi (17.19 km)	250 yd (230 m)
EF3	A tornado touched down south of Muddy Creek, tearing shingles from a house. North of the house location, it completely removed a metal machine shed by pulling bolts through its concrete foundation and tossing the structure about 50 yd (46 m). Two buildings at an old farmstead were leveled, a combine was pushed 60 yd (55 m), an empty grain cart was tipped into a grain truck, a drill was shoved in a quarter-circle path, and seven empty cattle feeders were scattered into a wheat field. Continuing north, the tornado damaged trees and grain bins, broke a power pole, and blew a stock tank over 100 yd (91 m) at a homestead. Turning northeast, it caused further tree, pivot, and structural damage as it crossed some roads. It then turned north again, tracking along Veterans Memorial Highway where it snapped about thirty power poles before dissipating just south of a homestead.						
EFU	NNW of Stratton	Hitchcock	NE	40.236°N 101.28°W	00:04–00:07	0.51 mi (0.82 km)	50 yd (46 m)
EFU	High-resolution satellite imagery showed a second satellite tornado occurred alongside the Stratton EF3 and remained in a field.						
EF3	NNW of Grainfield to SSW of Hoxie	Sheridan	KS	39.207°N 100.52°W	00:07–00:14	4.24 mi (6.82 km)	230 yd (210 m)
EF3	A low-end EF3 tornado began its path by snapping trees and power poles. As it approached a farm, it destroyed a metal warehouse, demolished farm equipment, and swept away an empty grain bin. The tornado continued north, causing additional tree damage and snapping more power poles before eventually lifting.						
EF2	NNW of Grainfield	Sheridan	KS	39.214°N 100.513°W	00:08–00:11	0.34 mi (0.55 km)	20 yd (18 m)
EF2	A strong satellite tornado to the Grainfield EF3 twisted a pivot and snapped tree tops on a windbreak before merging into the main tornado.						
EF0	E of Kinsley	Edwards	KS	37.89°N 99.37°W	00:21–00:33	4.18 mi (6.73 km)	50 yd (46 m)
EF0	This high-end EF0 tornado broke branches off trees and caused damage to a barn and farm equipment.						
EF2	W of Hayes Center to S of Dickens	Hayes, Lincoln	NE	40.51°N 101.09°W	00:35–01:09	17.56 mi (28.26 km)	1,000 yd (910 m)
EF2	A strong tornado moved through central Hayes County, damaging multiple center pivots and downing power lines. It impacted two farmsteads, shattering windows in both homes and vehicles. A large bovine operation suffered fencing damage and destruction to outbuildings. As the tornado entered Lincoln County, damage became more scattered but still included additional downed power lines, damaged center pivots, and tree damage before lifting.						
EF1	NNE of Mingus	Palo Pinto	TX	32.5677°N 98.412°W	00:36–00:40	0.4 mi (0.64 km)	400 yd (370 m)
EF1	This tornado caused tree damage along its path, with the most significant impacts occurring on private property. Several large pecan trees were uprooted, and a few large trunks were snapped. Numerous large branches and small tree trunks were also broken throughout the area. Additionally, sheet metal was torn from a metal shed on the northern side of the property.						
EF2	ESE of Nettleton to NW of Garfield	Edwards, Pawnee	KS	37.98°N 99.26°W	00:39–00:56	7.68 mi (12.36 km)	50 yd (46 m)
EF2	A strong tornado began north of Lewis and moved north before curving slightly west. It crossed US 56 and dissipated about two miles northwest of Garfield. Along its path, trees were uprooted and snapped, irrigation pivots were flipped, and power lines and poles were damaged.						
EF1	Gordon	Palo Pinto	TX	32.5706°N 98.3718°W	00:48–00:54	2.11 mi (3.40 km)	995 yd (910 m)
EF1	A tornado formed north of Gordon, first damaging a small building and two barns on a rural property. The tornado then tracked south-southeast and entered Gordon, causing widespread tree and power pole damage along with partial roof loss on several homes due to torn-off metal panels. Significant damage occurred at the town's high school stadium and nearby athletic fields, including destruction to locker rooms, the weight room, bleachers, scoreboards, and a stadium light pole that was bent in half. A manufactured home was destroyed in the southeastern part of town, where the tornado reached peak intensity. It continued southeast of Gordon, leaving a path of tree damage before dissipating. Four people were injured.						
EFU	ENE of Max	Dundy	NE	40.1213°N 101.377°W	00:54–00:55	0.13 mi (0.21 km)	50 yd (46 m)
EFU	An off-duty NWS employee reported a tornado crossing US 34.						
EF0	SSW of Santo	Palo Pinto	TX	32.582°N 98.2443°W	01:01–01:07	2.59 mi (4.17 km)	1,000 yd (910 m)
EF0	A multi-vortex tornado was confirmed southwest of Santo, with multiple short-lived vortices observed. Scattered tree damage occurred along its path along FM 4 south of Santo. Some vortices lasted only a few seconds, while others persisted up to thirty seconds, and at one point two vortices near FM 4 appeared to rotate around each other before dissipating.						
EFU	SE of Santo	Palo Pinto	TX	32.5982°N 98.1946°W	01:07–01:08	0.23 mi (0.37 km)	50 yd (46 m)
EFU	This tornado was recorded by storm chasers over inaccessible areas.						
EF0	N of Lipan	Parker	TX	32.5923°N 98.0496°W	01:36–01:40	3.12 mi (5.02 km)	200 yd (180 m)
EF0	A barn was destroyed and trees were damaged.						
EF3	NW of Coldwater to SSE of Mullinville	Comanche, Kiowa	KS	37.38°N 99.44°W	02:21–02:38	8.08 mi (13.00 km)	800 yd (730 m)
EF3	See section on this tornado						
EF3	S of Greensburg to Brenham	Kiowa	KS	37.5°N 99.33°W	02:44–03:06	10.41 mi (16.75 km)	900 yd (820 m)
EF3	See section on this tornado						
EF1	S of Greensburg	Kiowa	KS	37.55°N 99.28°W	02:55	0.25 mi (0.40 km)	50 yd (46 m)
EF1	A brief satellite tornado of the 0244 UTC Greensburg EF3 tornado snapped wooden power poles and partially flipped an irrigation pivot.						
EF3	SSE of Brenham to SSW of Hopewell	Kiowa, Edwards	KS	37.59°N 99.2°W	03:04–03:34	12.68 mi (20.41 km)	1,700 yd (1,600 m)
EF3	See section on this tornado						
EF0	SE of Shickley	Fillmore	NE	40.3929°N 97.6762°W	03:09–03:13	3.1 mi (5.0 km)	30 yd (27 m)
EF0	A weak tornado developed near a church, causing minor damage to church grounds and nearby center pivot irrigation systems. It traveled north, producing minor tree damage before lifting just north of N-74. The tornado’s intensity was rated based on the combined tree and equipment damage.						
EF1	NNE of Brenham	Kiowa	KS	37.64°N 99.19°W	03:14–03:21	2.82 mi (4.54 km)	50 yd (46 m)
EF1	See section on this tornado						
EF1	E of Hernando	DeSoto	MS	34.8296°N 89.9603°W	03:26–03:27	0.42 mi (0.68 km)	50 yd (46 m)
EF1	Trees were snapped or uprooted.						
EF3	N of Cullison to NE of Iuka	Pratt	KS	37.67°N 98.91°W	03:47–04:08	11.76 mi (18.93 km)	1,500 yd (1,400 m)
EF3	See section on this tornado						
EFU	SW of Iuka	Pratt	KS	37.71°N 98.75°W	04:09–04:11	1.76 mi (2.83 km)	30 yd (27 m)
EFU	See section on this tornado						
EF3	NW of Preston to Plevna to NNE of Huntsville	Pratt, Stafford, Reno	KS	37.79°N 98.65°W	04:17–05:20	32.45 mi (52.22 km)	1,760 yd (1,610 m)
EF3	See section on this tornado						

=== May 19 event ===
List of confirmed tornadoes – Monday, May 19, 2025
EF#	Location	County / parish	State	Start coord.	Time (UTC)	Path length	Max. width
EFU	WNW of St. Paul	Howard	NE	41.2258°N 98.5342°W	05:51		
EFU	A brief tornado was observed by several storm spotters.						
EF1	SE of Allen to S of Atwood	Hughes	OK	34.854°N 96.393°W	19:46–19:53	4.4 mi (7.1 km)	600 yd (550 m)
EF1	At least one home and one barn had roof damage. Significant tree damage also occurred.						
EF0	SSW of Atwood	Hughes	OK	34.91°N 96.372°W	19:53–19:56	1.8 mi (2.9 km)	40 yd (37 m)
EF0	Scattered tree damage occurred.						
EF1	NM of Briggs to Southern Pumpkin Hollow	Cherokee	OK	35.956°N 94.896°W	22:03–22:07	2.6 mi (4.2 km)	600 yd (550 m)
EF1	This tornado developed east of SH-10 and tracked eastward, snapping and uprooting numerous trees and destroying an outbuilding before crossing the Illinois River. After crossing the river, it continued to cause tree damage before dissipating.						
EF1	E of Rogers to W of North Bend	Dodge	NE	41.4569°N 96.8706°W	22:29–22:31	1.69 mi (2.72 km)	70 yd (64 m)
EF1	A tornado developed over the Platte River and moved eastward, coming ashore on the north side where it damaged campers, mobile homes, and several cottonwood and maple trees. One large cottonwood was uprooted and fell onto a home, injuring an occupant.						
EF1	SE of Wardville	Atoka	OK	34.61°N 95.986°W	22:37–22:38	1 mi (1.6 km)	400 yd (370 m)
EF1	A few trees were damaged.						
EF3	SSW of Pittsburg to SW of Hartshorne	Pittsburg	OK	34.665°N 95.863°W	22:44–23:07	16 mi (26 km)	2,972 yd (2,718 m)
EF3	A massive and intense tornado developed southwest of Pittsburg and intensified as it neared Pittsburg Lake, producing significant damage to trees and homes north of the lake, injuring one person. The tornado grew in size as it passed southeast of Pittsburg, damaging two more homes and reaching its peak width of 1.7 miles (2.7 km) near Blanco, where several homes sustained significant roof damage and numerous power poles were broken. The most intense damage occurred just east of Blanco, where a forested area was nearly leveled, with many trees stripped of bark and limbs. The tornado then gradually weakened before dissipating. One person was injured.						
EFU	NE of Du Bois	Pawnee, Richardson	NE	40.0502°N 96.0384°W	22:50–22:53	2.15 mi (3.46 km)	50 yd (46 m)
EFU	This intermittent tornado caused no damage over open land.						
EFU	SE of St. Jo	Cooke	TX	33.6668°N 97.477°W	23:02	0.12 mi (0.19 km)	40 yd (37 m)
EFU	A storm chaser recorded a tornado that lasted approximately ten seconds.						
EF1	S of Hartshorne to SW of Wilburton	Pittsburg, Latimer	OK	34.805°N 95.575°W	23:14–23:31	11.1 mi (17.9 km)	1,500 yd (1,400 m)
EF1	This large tornado developed southwest of Hartshorne Lake and tracked northeast, damaging or destroying multiple outbuildings and small industrial buildings. It also caused damage to power lines and affected several homes. The tornado then entered Latimer County, shifting to an easterly path before dissipating southwest of Wilburton.						
EF1	W of Webbers Falls to Northern Gore to Redbird Smith	Muskogee, Sequoyah	OK	35.514°N 95.205°W	23:22–23:33	9.5 mi (15.3 km)	900 yd (820 m)
EF1	A tornado developed in a rural area and moved east-northeast, destroying outbuildings, uprooting or snapping trees, and overturning a center pivot irrigation system before crossing the Arkansas River. It continued through the north side of Gore, causing additional tree and outbuilding damage, before dissipating in a rural area east of town.						
EF1	NE of Pittsburg	Pittsburg	OK	34.73°N 95.815°W	23:31–23:32	0.3 mi (0.48 km)	100 yd (91 m)
EF1	A few trees were uprooted.						
EF0	SSE of Volland	Wabaunsee	KS	38.8618°N 96.3726°W	23:42–23:43	0.38 mi (0.61 km)	40 yd (37 m)
EF0	Minor tree damage occurred.						
EF1	N of Evening Shade to Southern Lyons Switch	Cherokee, Adair	OK	35.651°N 94.894°W	23:44–23:56	12.3 mi (19.8 km)	1,100 yd (1,000 m)
EF1	This tornado developed in a rural area, snapping and uprooting numerous trees, damaging a couple of homes, destroying an outbuilding, and snapping power poles. It moved northeast through rugged terrain, continuing to snap and uproot trees and large limbs before dissipating near a lake in Adair County.						
EF1	E of Pettit to Southern Tenkiller to Rocky Mountain	Cherokee, Adair	OK	35.756°N 94.916°W	23:47–23:58	10.4 mi (16.7 km)	1,300 yd (1,200 m)
EF1	This tornado developed over Lake Tenkiller and moved northeast, snapping and uprooting numerous trees as it passed through Cherokee Landing State Park. It continued to uproot trees as it crossed SH-82 and SH-100, with additional widespread tree damage observed as it progressed toward and into Adair County. The tornado eventually dissipated after causing more tree damage beyond the county line.						
EF1	NNE of Bunch, OK to Northwestern Stilwell, OK to NW of Morrow, AR	Adair (OK), Washington (AR)	OK, AR	35.766°N 94.723°W	23:55–00:16	16.7 mi (26.9 km)	2,200 yd (2,000 m)
EF1	A tornado uprooted or snapped many trees, several homes were damaged, outbuildings were destroyed, and power poles were blown down.						
EF1	Lowry City	St. Clair	MO	38.12°N 93.74°W	23:55–00:04	4.57 mi (7.35 km)	50 yd (46 m)
EF1	This tornado began south-southwest of Lowry City and tracked through the city, causing increasing damage as it moved northeast. The most severe impacts occurred northeast of town, where a mobile home had its roof torn off, several barns and outbuildings were destroyed, trees were uprooted, and power lines were downed before the tornado lifted.						
EF1	E of Baron, OK to Clyde, AR	Adair (OK), Washington (AR)	OK, AR	35.92°N 94.533°W	00:11–00:22	8.2 mi (13.2 km)	1,000 yd (910 m)
EF1	Trees were uprooted and large tree limbs were snapped.						
EF1	ENE of Mount Zion to N of Finey	Henry	MO	38.23°N 93.59°W	00:15–00:19	3.4 mi (5.5 km)	200 yd (180 m)
EF1	This tornado began in far southeast Henry county, causing significant damage to a house, nearby outbuildings, and numerous trees. As it moved east, it continued to cause substantial tree damage along its path, with the most intense impacts extending as far as north of a local church.						
EF1	Southern Lincoln to SE of Walnut Grove	Washington	AR	35.941°N 94.429°W	00:20–00:32	11.6 mi (18.7 km)	900 yd (820 m)
EF1	A high-end EF1 tornado caused minor to severe damage to homes, uprooted or snapped numerous trees, snapped power poles, and destroyed outbuildings.						
EF1	E of Lincoln	Washington	AR	35.953°N 94.393°W	00:21–00:23	1 mi (1.6 km)	500 yd (460 m)
EF1	Trees were uprooted.						
EF1	WSW of Shady Point to SW of Pocola	LeFlore	OK	35.102°N 94.746°W	00:21–00:35	11.9 mi (19.2 km)	1,100 yd (1,000 m)
EF1	A tornado developed near Calhoun and moved northeast, uprooting trees and snapping large limbs along its path. It caused additional tree damage as it crossed SH-59 and surrounding areas before likely dissipating in a rural area to the northeast.						
EF1	W of Racket	Benton	MO	38.29°N 93.51°W	00:24–00:27	1.3 mi (2.1 km)	500 yd (460 m)
EF1	A mobile home was pushed off its foundation, outbuildings were damaged, and trees were snapped.						
EF1	S of Palo Pinto	Benton	MO	38.34°N 93.48°W	00:28–00:34	4.32 mi (6.95 km)	500 yd (460 m)
EF1	Several barns were damaged, power lines were downed, and numerous trees were uprooted or snapped.						
EF2	Greenland	Washington	AR	35.969°N 94.208°W	00:29–00:46	13.6 mi (21.9 km)	1,100 yd (1,000 m)
EF2	A strong tornado developed west of I-49, snapping and uprooting trees before moving northeast across the interstate, where it severely damaged a metal building. It continued east across the southern portion of Drake Field, then turned east-northeast, crossing AR 16 before dissipating. Along its path, numerous trees were snapped or uprooted, industrial buildings, homes, and businesses were damaged, many power poles were snapped, and several outbuildings were destroyed.						
EF1	NNW of Cameron, OK to Rock Island, OK to ESE of Central City, AR	LeFlore (OK), Sebastian (AR)	OK, AR	35.162°N 94.554°W	00:34–00:59	21.4 mi (34.4 km)	1,000 yd (910 m)
EF1	A long-track tornado developed in a rural area, initially uprooting a few trees and snapping large limbs before crossing SH-112 and entering Arkansas near Bonanza. It remained weak through the north side of Bonanza, causing minor tree damage, then strengthened near US 71, uprooting and snapping more trees. As it moved across Fort Chaffee, it damaged forty buildings and caused extensive tree damage before turning east-northeast and dissipating just before reaching AR 22.						
EF1	ENE of Palo Pinto to NNW of Lincoln	Benton	MO	38.39°N 93.41°W	00:35–00:41	4.4 mi (7.1 km)	300 yd (270 m)
EF1	Several power poles were downed and three barns were damaged. Numerous trees were uprooted with a few being snapped.						
EF1	SSE of Hinesville to Northern Huntsville to SSW of Marble	Madison	AR	36.089°N 93.849°W	00:54–01:10	14.3 mi (23.0 km)	900 yd (820 m)
EF1	This tornado developed and began to snap large tree limbs and uproot trees. It moved northeast before turning east-southeast, eventually crossing the northern side of Huntsville and tracking just south of US 412. Along its path, numerous trees were snapped or uprooted, and several outbuildings were destroyed before the tornado dissipated.						
EF1	W of Huntsville	Madison	AR	36.082°N 93.833°W	00:56–00:59	2.4 mi (3.9 km)	550 yd (500 m)
EF1	Numerous trees were snapped and outbuildings were destroyed.						
EFU	SSW of Hematite to NW of Olympian Village	Jefferson	MO	38.1543°N 90.4818°W	01:02–01:03	2.39 mi (3.85 km)	100 yd (91 m)
EFU	A tornado was captured on video but no damage was found.						
EF1	N of Marble to SW of Osage	Carroll	AR	36.16°N 93.582°W	01:11–01:20	7.2 mi (11.6 km)	2,300 yd (2,100 m)
EF1	Hundreds of trees were snapped or uprooted.						
EF1	S of Osage to SW of Carrollton	Carroll	AR	36.165°N 93.417°W	01:21–01:25	4.2 mi (6.8 km)	1,000 yd (910 m)
EF1	Outbuildings were damaged and numerous trees were snapped and/or uprooted.						
EF0	S of St. Joseph	Buchanan	MO	39.68°N 94.83°W	01:31–01:38	4.32 mi (6.95 km)	20 yd (18 m)
EF0	A weak tornado caused sporadic tree damage along its path. Minor roof damage was also reported to several buildings before the tornado dissipated.						
EF1	W of Peoria	Iron, Washington	MO	37.7253°N 90.9534°W	01:56–02:01	2.75 mi (4.43 km)	50 yd (46 m)
EF1	Tree damage occurred.						
EF1	ENE of Darien to SE of Doss	Dent	MO	37.53°N 91.56°W	03:18–03:26	6.39 mi (10.28 km)	50 yd (46 m)
EF1	A barn was damaged and trees were uprooted.						
EF0	W of Howes	Dent	MO	37.72°N 91.61°W	03:20–03:21	0.97 mi (1.56 km)	75 yd (69 m)
EF0	Trees were uprooted and barns were severely damaged.						
EF0	S of Telephone	Fannin	TX	33.7365°N 96.0434°W	03:20–03:25	1.36 mi (2.19 km)	75 yd (69 m)
EF0	Scattered tree damage occurred.						
EF0	SE of Salem	Dent	MO	37.61°N 91.55°W	03:21–03:25	4.26 mi (6.86 km)	500 yd (460 m)
EF0	Barns were damaged and numerous trees were uprooted.						
EF0	N of Max	Dent	MO	37.6027°N 91.4163°W	03:28–03:30	1.93 mi (3.11 km)	50 yd (46 m)
EF0	Trees were snapped and uprooted in a valley and a barn was damaged.						
EF0	WNW of Fletcher	Washington	MO	38.1418°N 90.7735°W	03:39–03:40	2.21 mi (3.56 km)	140 yd (130 m)
EF0	Tree damage occurred.						
EF0	WNW of Bunker	Reynolds	MO	37.5128°N 91.2426°W	03:40–03:41	1.61 mi (2.59 km)	25 yd (23 m)
EF0	A weak tornado produced tree damage.						
EF1	ESE of Cherryville	Crawford	MO	37.8327°N 91.2339°W	03:50–03:51	1.03 mi (1.66 km)	270 yd (250 m)
EF1	A small farm outbuilding was destroyed and multiple trees were damaged.						
EF1	Iron Mountain to SSE of Bismarck	St. Francois	MO	37.6901°N 90.6408°W	04:31–04:33	4.24 mi (6.82 km)	500 yd (460 m)
EF1	The tornado touched down just south of Iron Mountain, causing home and tree damage along a county highway. It continued northeast, damaging another home before dissipating shortly after.						

=== May 20 event ===
List of confirmed tornadoes – Tuesday, May 20, 2025
EF#	Location	County / parish	State	Start coord.	Time (UTC)	Path length	Max. width
EF0	N of Goose Creek Lake	Ste. Genevieve	MO	38.0211°N 90.3677°W	05:02–05:03	1.33 mi (2.14 km)	25 yd (23 m)
EF0	A high-end EF0 tornado damaged several trees.						
EF1	S of Prairie du Rocher	Randolph	IL	38.0514°N 90.1017°W	05:21–05:22	0.45 mi (0.72 km)	25 yd (23 m)
EF1	A small pole barn was collapsed.						
EF1	Northern Cape Girardeau	Cape Girardeau	MO	37.4442°N 89.1126°W	06:08–06:10	1.81 mi (2.91 km)	50 yd (46 m)
EF1	This tornado touched down at an aquatic center, damaging overhead umbrella structures and a few trees. It moved east into northern Cape Girardeau neighborhoods, where numerous trees were snapped or uprooted, and several homes sustained minor roof or siding damage. The tornado lifted shortly after passing through this residential area.						
EF0	ESE of Powderly	Lamar	TX	33.7936°N 95.4719°W	06:41–06:42	0.11 mi (0.18 km)	50 yd (46 m)
EF0	A very brief tornado damaged some trees.						
EF1	NNE of Dongola to WSW of Buncombe	Union	IL	37.4442°N 89.1126°W	06:46–06:50	1.81 mi (2.91 km)	50 yd (46 m)
EF1	A tornado touched down along IL 146, snapping and uprooting several trees. It also caused minor shingle and siding damage to a few homes before lifting.						
EF1	NW of Caddo Valley to NW of Friendship	Clark, Hot Spring	AR	34.243°N 93.1198°W	07:08–07:16	3.8 mi (6.1 km)	100 yd (91 m)
EF1	A tornado began near the northeast side of DeGray Lake at the Clark and Hot Springs county line, snapping and uprooting a swath of trees. As it moved northeast, it heavily damaged a home by shifting it off its concrete foundation, though the structure remained mostly intact. Numerous trees were downed along its path, with one falling on a house and causing structural damage. The tornado continued northeast, causing additional tree damage and moderate roof damage to another home before dissipating just north of its final crossing of AR 128.						
EF1	Northern Wright	Lauderdale	AL	34.9045°N 88.0145°W	17:03-17:08	1.78 mi (2.86 km)	80 yd (73 m)
EF1	This tornado formed over the Tennessee River and moved onshore, causing tree damage. It continued northeast, where a farm outbuilding sustained roof damage and caused further damage to trees, eventually lifting.						
EF0	N of Lewisburg	Marshall	TN	35.5141°N 86.7715°W	18:20-18:25	1.42 mi (2.29 km)	300 yd (270 m)
EF0	This tornado touched down near Cowden, uprooting several trees and lifting the roof off a barn. As it moved northeast, it crossed Big Rock Creek, damaging the roof of a home and nearby trees. It continued to uproot and snap additional trees before lifting.						
EF1	S of Coalfield	Roane	TN	35.9762°N 84.4092°W	19:15–19:16	0.49 mi (0.79 km)	100 yd (91 m)
EF1	Numerous trees were snapped.						
EF0	Northwestern Oakland	Coles, Douglas	IL	39.6602°N 88.0371°W	19:15–19:19	2.85 mi (4.59 km)	20 yd (18 m)
EF0	A weak tornado touched down on the northwest side of Oakland, damaging tree branches before moving northeast through a grove of trees. It continued across farm fields in northeastern Coles County and southeastern Douglas County without causing additional damage, eventually lifting east of Walnut Point State Park.						
EF0	W of Jackson	Madison	TN	35.5905°N 88.941°W	20:15–20:17	1.29 mi (2.08 km)	75 yd (69 m)
EF0	This tornado touched down in a wooded area and moved northeast, damaging a warehouse by tearing off portions of its roof. Video footage showed roof debris being lofted into the air, some of which was later found on the Jackson Regional Airport airfield where the tornado lifted.						
EFU	S of Latham	Logan	IL	39.9354°N 89.1677°W	20:27–20:28	1.11 mi (1.79 km)	30 yd (27 m)
EFU	A storm spotter reported a rain-wrapped tornado. No damage was found.						
EF0	NNW of Hohenwald	Lewis	TN	35.6°N 87.57°W	20:59-21:06	2.67 mi (4.30 km)	50 yd (46 m)
EF0	A brief, weak tornado was observed on web cameras. No damage was able to be accessed since the tornado occurred over inaccessible areas.						
EFU	W of Paxton	Ford	IL	40.4633°N 88.1537°W	21:09–21:11	0.65 mi (1.05 km)	100 yd (91 m)
EFU	This tornado remained over open farmland.						
EF0	N of Royal to S of Penfield	Champaign	IL	40.2488°N 87.9699°W	21:57–21:59	0.92 mi (1.48 km)	30 yd (27 m)
EF0	A high-end EF0 tornado caused some tree damage, partially removed the roof of an outbuilding, and tossed it northeast, then dissipated shortly afterward.						
EF1	ESE of Portland to WSW of Lakeport	Chicot	AR	33.2128°N 91.4107°W	22:04–22:21	11.6 mi (18.7 km)	700 yd (640 m)
EF1	This high-end EF1 tornado began along AR 160 and moved east through Chicot Junction before lifting east of US 65. Along its path, several utility poles were snapped, and numerous trees were snapped or uprooted. Two metal farm buildings near the Boeuf River were damaged, including one where concrete anchors were pulled from the ground due to its open-air design. The tornado lifted in an open field east of Bayou Macon.						
EF1	SSW of Armstrong to S of Potomac	Vermilion	IL	40.2634°N 87.8937°W	22:06–22:10	5 mi (8.0 km)	80 yd (73 m)
EF1	This tornado damaged trees and snapped two power poles as it moved east. It was caught on video shortly before snapping or uprooting around a dozen large trees before lifting.						
EF0	SW of Collison to SE of Jamesburg	Vermilion	IL	40.202°N 87.8439°W	22:06–22:15	6.67 mi (10.73 km)	40 yd (37 m)
EF0	Minor tree damage occurred.						
EF0	NNW of Woodlawn to Northern Clarksville	Montgomery	TN	36.5578°N 87.5171°W	22:08-22:19	9.41 mi (15.14 km)	100 yd (91 m)
EF0	A tornado touched down in Fort Campbell, causing minor tree damage before moving northeast through nearby neighborhoods where several trees were uprooted and tree tops snapped. After crossing US 41A, it continued to snap large tree branches along its path. The tornado lifted north of a local middle school, with damage primarily limited to trees throughout its track.						
EF1	Ford City to SE of Rogersville	Colbert, Lawrence, Lauderdale, Limestone	AL	34.7874°N 87.5347°W	22:10-22:39	17.74 mi (28.55 km)	575 yd (526 m)
EF1	This tornado touched down in Ford City, initially snapping tree limbs before rapidly intensifying and uprooting numerous trees. Nearby, a tree top snapped and fell on a home, injuring a child. The tornado reached peak intensity with the destruction of two silos that had stood since the 1930s. It continued east-southeast, uprooting trees and snapping large limbs as it passed through rural areas and crossed the Tennessee River at Wheeler Lake. Drone imagery confirmed a narrow damage path of snapped and uprooted trees south of Rogersville. The tornado crossed the Elk River and eventually weakened, snapping additional limbs and tree tops before lifting.						
EF0	Southern Clarksville to Sango	Montgomery	TN	36.4985°N 87.2743°W	22:25-22:28	3.2 mi (5.1 km)	200 yd (180 m)
EF0	A high-end EF0 tornado touched down and caused a few trees to lean or fall before moving northeast, where it uprooted and snapped additional trees and caused minor damage to homes. It lifted before reaching the area of I-24.						
EF0	ENE of Bismarck	Vermilion	IL	40.2684°N 87.5532°W	22:39–22:41	1.7 mi (2.7 km)	30 yd (27 m)
EF0	The roof of an outbuilding was damaged.						
EF0	E of Wartrace	Bedford, Coffee	TN	35.5233°N 86.2471°W	22:47-22:51	1.13 mi (1.82 km)	150 yd (140 m)
EF0	A few farm structures and trees were damaged.						
EFU	NE of Hillsboro to N of Trinity	Lawrence, Limestone	AL	34.6851°N 87.1256°W	22:51-22:57	2.19 mi (3.52 km)	25 yd (23 m)
EFU	A waterspout was observed over Wheeler Lake.						
EF1	E of Rogersville	Limestone	AL	34.8125°N 87.208°W	23:09-23:10	0.87 mi (1.40 km)	65 yd (59 m)
EF1	This brief tornado caused tree damage, including multiple downed trees and large branches as it moved east through mainly wooded areas parallel to US 72.						
EF2	SE of Tanner to Northern Madison	Limestone, Madison	AL	34.7168°N 86.9489°W	23:09-23:35	13.15 mi (21.16 km)	380 yd (350 m)
EF2	This strong tornado, which prompted the issuance of a tornado emergency as it approached Huntsville, was first observed west of I-65 near Tanner and caused numerous trees to be uprooted or snapped as it crossed I-65. It continued eastward, damaging trees and inflicting minor roof damage to several structures. Upon entering Madison County, it caused minor roof damage to multiple homes and downed trees, with one home experiencing significant facade damage. The tornado then reached peak intensity, where two homes lost most or all of their roofing and numerous trees were uprooted. It continued east with sporadic tree damage and dissipated thereafter.						
EF1	Athens	Limestone	AL	34.7749°N 87.0065°W	23:11-23:13	2.76 mi (4.44 km)	160 yd (150 m)
EF1	A tornado likely began south of US 72 and moved east-northeast, causing significant damage near its initial touchpoint, including snapped wooden power poles and broken cross members. Numerous trees were uprooted, and additional power poles were snapped along its path. The tornado continued through the area near US 72 before lifting shortly thereafter.						
EF1	Eastern Huntsville to S of Maysville	Madison	AL	34.7355°N 86.5645°W	23:51-23:57	8.68 mi (13.97 km)	280 yd (260 m)
EF1	A high-end EF1 tornado began on the eastern side of Huntsville, snapping hardwood and softwood trees at the base of Monte Sano Mountain. It intensified as it moved upslope, causing widespread tree damage across Monte Sano State Park. After crossing the mountain, it continued through Moontown, producing additional tree damage near the Flint River. As it moved south of US 72, it weakened near Madison County High School, downing several power poles. The tornado finally dissipated after causing minor tree and barn damage in nearby fields.						
EF1	S of Basham to Priceville	Morgan	AL	34.4683°N 87.0294°W	23:52-00:00	11.02 mi (17.73 km)	540 yd (490 m)
EF1	This tornado touched down and moved east toward US 31, uprooting trees and snapping large branches. It continued eastward, reaching its max width and snapping numerous large tree branches. The tornado continued across US 31, then turned northeast, damaging additional trees as it crossed I-65 and moved into Priceville. It caused more scattered large branch damage before lifting.						
EF2	E of Maysville to N of Trenton	Madison, Jackson	AL	34.7649°N 86.3811°W	00:07-00:17	7.05 mi (11.35 km)	400 yd (370 m)
EF2	A strong tornado touched down and initially downed a large swath of hardwood trees, also damaging a barn by uplifting part of its roof. As it moved across open fields, it intensified to high-end EF2 strength, completely destroying a mobile home and throwing its frame over 150 yards (140 m). Debris from the home was scattered up to 250 yards (230 m) away. Nearby homes sustained roof damage and projectile impacts, with one structure suffering major structural failure due to poor anchoring. The tornado continued upslope, snapping and uprooting large areas of hardwood trees before lifting.						
EF1	Trenton to ESE of Skyline	Jackson	AL	34.7522°N 86.2435°W	00:14-00:28	10.46 mi (16.83 km)	275 yd (251 m)
EF1	A high-end EF1 tornado touched down just southeast of SR 65 in Trenton, producing large limb damage before strengthening and snapping or uprooting trees along its path. Near Guess Creek, it downed large swaths of trees and embedded debris several feet into the ground. Minor roof damage and the loss of a roof on an older outbuilding were also observed. The tornado continued northeast, causing additional tree damage at a cemetery and a downstream farm. It produced sporadic tree damage in several areas before crossing SR 79, eventually snapping a few more trees south of Maynard Cove where it dissipated.						
EF1	N of Melvine	Cumberland	TN	35.7875°N 85.0849°W	00:29-00:37	4.79 mi (7.71 km)	150 yd (140 m)
EF1	A tornado touched down near New Era, causing timber damage and minor structural damage to homes. As it moved east-northeast, it produced more substantial tree damage and damaged or removed roofs from two homes in the Big Lick area. The tornado continued to cause timber and power line damage before lifting near SR 28.						
EF1	W of Union Grove	Marshall	AL	34.4243°N 86.5686°W	01:46-01:50	3.39 mi (5.46 km)	150 yd (140 m)
EF1	A tornado began on the northern portion of the Cherokee Ridge Golf Course, uprooting multiple hardwood trees across several holes. It moved eastward, crossing US 231 and continuing to uproot numerous trees along its path. Additional tree damage was observed further northeast before the tornado lifted before reaching Union Grove.						
EF0	Section to ESE of Dutton	Jackson	AL	34.5794°N 85.9819°W	01:47-01:52	6.09 mi (9.80 km)	105 yd (96 m)
EF0	This tornado began near the intersection of SR 71 and SR 35, close to local baseball fields, primarily downing small and large tree branches. Two trees were uprooted, though both showed signs of rot. The tornado continued eastward, causing minor damage before lifting.						
EF1	Crossville to WNW of Collinsville	DeKalb	AL	34.2848°N 85.991°W	02:33-02:42	6 mi (9.7 km)	700 yd (640 m)
EF1	A tornado began in Crossville, uprooting a large tree, snapping a thick branch, and damaging a small porch. It moved east, roughly paralleling SR 68, causing sporadic tree damage and breaking large branches. At the Sand Mountain Research Extension Center, it intensified, collapsing the roof of a building. Continuing east, it uprooted a large tree and snapped another with signs of rot. As it weakened, it tossed a hay covering structure across a field and tore through part of a barn wall. The tornado narrowed and continued east to east-southeast, causing additional tree and branch damage before lifting east of a nearby roadway.						
EF1	NNW of Sand Rock	DeKalb	AL	34.2941°N 85.7893°W	02:49-02:52	0.37 mi (0.60 km)	250 yd (230 m)
EF1	This tornado began by uprooting a large tree and snapping a nearby branch before quickly strengthening near SR 176. At one residence, three large pine trees were partially uprooted, and another snapped in a different direction, falling onto a mobile home and destroying a carport. A nearby camper trailer was lifted, dragged 15 yards (14 m), and flipped on its side. Additional minor tree limb damage was observed further along the path before the tornado ended.						
EF0	NW of Folsom to E of Sonoraville	Gordon	GA	34.4109°N 84.867°W	03:42–03:49	4.72 mi (7.60 km)	200 yd (180 m)
EF0	A high-end EF0 tornado touched down southeast of Calhoun, uprooting several large trees, including one that fell onto a home. It continued northeast, snapping and uprooting more trees and tearing roofing from part of a chicken house. In a nearby neighborhood, numerous trees were downed, some falling onto homes, while a manufactured home lost roofing and siding, a pontoon boat was flipped, and two small sheds were destroyed. The tornado lifted shortly after exiting the neighborhood.						
EF0	W of Sonoraville	Gordon	GA	34.4541°N 84.8723°W	03:43–03:47	2.39 mi (3.85 km)	100 yd (91 m)
EF0	A weak tornado touched down near SR 53, uprooting a few small trees before crossing the highway and destroying a pole barn, with debris scattered roughly 150 yards (140 m). It continued east, snapping and uprooting several trees, including one that fell on a home, and severely damaging a barn by removing its roof and blowing out a wall. In a nearby neighborhood, it snapped additional trees and scattered branches before weakening and dissipating.						

=== May 21 event ===
List of confirmed tornadoes – Wednesday, May 21, 2025
EF#	Location	County / parish	State	Start coord.	Time (UTC)	Path length	Max. width
EF0	Waleska	Cherokee	GA	34.3216°N 84.5631°W	04:09–04:13	2.05 mi (3.30 km)	150 yd (140 m)
EF0	This tornado touched down just northwest of Waleska shortly after midnight, initially uprooting or snapping a few trees. It continued east-southeast, paralleling SR 140 and downing several trees near homes on both sides of the road. The tornado maintained this pattern as it crossed the intersection of SR 140 and SR 108 in Waleska, causing additional tree damage near residences before lifting behind a home.						
EF1	SW of Saks to Anniston	Calhoun	AL	33.6952°N 85.8854°W	04:38–04:42	3.52 mi (5.66 km)	1,000 yd (910 m)
EF1	This tornado likely touched down in the restricted area of the Pelham Range, with the first accessible damage involving several large uprooted trees. As it moved east-southeast, it snapped and uprooted swaths of trees, some of which fell on both manufactured and site-built homes. Numerous pine trees blocked traffic along SR 46 and additional tree damage was reported near its intersection with other roads. The tornado continued roughly along SR 46, causing widespread tree damage before crossing US 431. Damage became more sparse and sporadic beyond this point, suggesting the tornado weakened and transitioned into a thunderstorm wind event.						
EF1	N of Ranburne	Cleburne	AL	33.574°N 85.3624°W	05:25–05:30	1.97 mi (3.17 km)	550 yd (500 m)
EF1	A tornado first touched down in a field where it destroyed half of an old barn and lofted debris in multiple directions. Part of the barn’s roof landed on a nearby home, embedding debris into the roof and yard. The home itself only suffered minor damage, including fascia damage and a partially collapsed garage door. Additional debris from the barn was found hundreds of yards away in a nearby pasture. As the tornado moved east-southeast, it snapped and uprooted hardwood trees along its path. It weakened further along its track, causing only minor tree branch damage before dissipating.						
EF1	Southeastern Heron Bay to Southern Locust Grove to NW of Jackson	Spalding, Henry, Butts	GA	33.3288°N 84.1823°W	07:39–07:56	10.35 mi (16.66 km)	300 yd (270 m)
EF1	A tornado touched down, initially knocking over trees before crossing SR 155 and tearing the roof off a large barn. A nearby camper with two occupants was lifted and slammed back down, sustaining damage from both impact and flying debris but miraculously, the occupants were not harmed. The tornado continued east, snapping and uprooting trees as it crossed into Henry county and then over I-75. It caused additional tree damage east of the interstate and entered a neighborhood in Locust Grove where numerous trees were downed, including several falling onto homes. The tornado moved into Butts county, continuing to snap and uproot trees along its path, with some of the damage overlapping areas still recovering from a tornado in January 2023. It eventually lifted just before reaching the northern part of Jackson.						
EF1	ESE of Mathews to S of Fitzpatrick	Bullock	AL	32.1896°N 85.9662°W	08:58–09:09	4.98 mi (8.01 km)	900 yd (820 m)
EF1	This tornado began in an open pasture, snapping large branches and uprooting one tree. It moved east through a small hunting club, uprooting additional trees, though no structural damage was observed. The tornado intensified as it crossed a county road, producing a wide swath of snapped and uprooted hardwood and softwood trees. It continued through mostly inaccessible wooded and pasture areas before dissipating, with minor tree damage noted near its endpoint.						
EF0	Unionville	Butler	PA	40.9381°N 79.9633°W	20:37–20:39	0.36 mi (0.58 km)	160 yd (150 m)
EF0	A tornado touched down, causing minor tree damage before severely damaging the Center Township salt dome by lifting its roof and depositing it in the nearby parking lot. A few additional trees sustained broken limbs and the tornado lifted shortly after in an open field northeast of the facility.						
EF0	NE of Unionville	Butler	PA	40.9639°N 79.8913°W	20:40–20:41	0.24 mi (0.39 km)	210 yd (190 m)
EF0	Several trees had large branches broken.						
EF0	E of West Middletown	Washington	PA	40.25°N 80.38°W	20:47–20:50	2.22 mi (3.57 km)	75 yd (69 m)
EF0	Several large tree limbs were snapped and fascia was removed on a home.						
EF1	McGovern to Gastonville	Washington	PA	40.2375°N 80.2618°W	20:57–21:21	13.89 mi (22.35 km)	200 yd (180 m)
EF1	This tornado first broke tree limbs and uprooted or snapped trees, with peak intensity observed in Houston where homes lost shingles, a lamp post was bent, a stop sign was tilted, and a metal porch awning was torn off. After weakening near a local school, the tornado fluctuated in strength, damaging trees, laying over wheat, and removing shingles from a barn. It intensified slightly near Finleyville where several trees were uprooted or snapped and siding was torn from a three-story apartment building. The tornado dissipated near PA 88.						

== See also ==
- Weather of 2025
- Tornadoes of 2025
  - List of United States tornadoes in May 2025
- Lists of tornadoes and tornado outbreaks
  - List of North American tornadoes and tornado outbreaks
