= Valley View =

Valley View may refer to:

== Places ==
- Valley View, Ooty, India
- Valley View, South Australia, Australia

=== United States ===
- Valley View, Kentucky
- Valley View, Benton County, Missouri
- Valley View, Sainte Genevieve County, Missouri
- Valley View, Ohio
- Valley View, Schuylkill County, Pennsylvania
- Valley View, York County, Pennsylvania
- Valley View, Texas
- Valley View (Carterville, Georgia), listed on the NRHP in Georgia
- Valley View (Romney, West Virginia), a 19th-century Greek Revival residence and farm
- Valley View Site, Medary, Wisconsin, listed on the NRHP in Wisconsin

== Schools ==
- Valley View Middle School (disambiguation)
- Valley View High School (disambiguation)
- Valley View Public School (disambiguation)
- Valley View School (Salida, Colorado), listed on the NRHP in Chaffee County
- Valley View School District (disambiguation)

== Other uses ==
- Valley View Center, a mall in Dallas, Texas, U.S.
- Valley View Farm, Harriman, Tennessee, U.S. listed on the NRHP in Tennessee
- Valley View Hospital, Glenwood Springs, Colorado, U.S.
- Valley View Mall (Roanoke, Virginia), U.S.

== See also ==
- Valley View Ferry, Kentucky, US
- Valleyview (disambiguation)
