= Tebo Creek =

Stream in the US state of Missouri

Tebo Creek is a stream in Benton and Henry Counties in the U.S. state of Missouri.

The stream begins at the confluence of East Fork Tebo Creek and the Middle Fork Tebo Creek just to the southeast of Calhoun and south of Missouri Route 52 at 38°27′42″N 93°36′31″W. The stream flows generally south and southeast to enter the waters of Truman Reservoir east of Clinton. Prior to the formation of the lake the stream continued to the southeast to enter the South Grand River to the east of Racket on Missouri Route 7 and just northwest of Harry S Truman State Park in Benton County at 38°18′00″N 93°27′55″W.

The name Tebo is a corruption of the French surnames Taveau or Thibeault.

Variant names include: Big Tebo Creek, Tabo Creek, Teabeau Creek, Teabo Creek and Thibault River.

== See also ==
- List of rivers of Missouri
