= Knobby, Missouri =

- Unincorporated community
- Location within Missouri Location within the United States
- Coordinates: 38°09′09″N 93°05′44″W
- Country: United States
- State: Missouri
- County: Benton
- Elevation: 938 ft (286 m)
- Time zone: UTC-6 (Central (CST))
  - Summer (DST): UTC-5 (CDT)
- Area code: 660
- GNIS feature ID: 740993

Knobby is an unincorporated community in Benton County, Missouri, United States. Knobby is located along Supplemental Route DD, 16.8 miles (27.0 km) east-southeast of Warsaw.

A variant name of the community was Nobby. A post office called Knobby was established in 1885, the name was changed to Nobby in 1907, and the post office closed in 1913. The community takes its name from Knobby Creek.
