= Turkey Creek (Osage River tributary) =

Stream in the US state of Missouri

Turkey Creek is a stream in Benton and Hickory counties in the U.S. state of Missouri. It is a tributary of the Osage River.

The headwaters arise in northern Hickory County just east of U.S. Route 65 southeast of Cross Timbers. The stream flows northwest to north into Benton County and to the east of Fristoe. It crosses under Missouri Route 7 southeast of Majorville and meanders north to enter the Osage River arm of the Lake of the Ozarks just east of Old Fredonia and six miles east of Warsaw. The source area is at 37°59′42″N 93°12′20″W and the confluence is at 38°15′30″N 93°13′52″W.

Turkey Creek was named for the wild turkeys in the area.

== See also ==
- List of rivers of Missouri
