= Brandon, Missouri =

- Unincorporated community
- Location within Missouri Location within the United States
- Coordinates: 38°30′29″N 93°25′23″W
- Country: United States
- State: Missouri
- County: Benton
- Elevation: 925 ft (282 m)
- Time zone: UTC-6 (Central (CST))
  - Summer (DST): UTC-5 (CDT)
- Area code: 660
- GNIS feature ID: 740689

Brandon is an unincorporated community in Benton County, Missouri, United States. Brandon is located on the northern border of Benton County, 5.4 miles (8.7 km) west of Ionia.

The community was named after the original owner of the town site.
