= Cold Springs, Missouri =

- Unincorporated community
- Location within Missouri Location within the United States
- Coordinates: 38°13′53″N 93°23′00″W
- Country: United States
- State: Missouri
- County: Benton
- Elevation: 696 ft (212 m)
- Time zone: UTC-6 (Central (CST))
  - Summer (DST): UTC-5 (CDT)
- Area code: 660
- GNIS feature ID: 716083

Cold Springs is an unincorporated community in Benton County, Missouri, United States. Cold Springs is located near the Osage River, 0.8 miles (1.3 km) south of downtown Warsaw.
