= White Branch, Missouri =

- Census-designated place
- Location within Missouri Location within the United States
- Coordinates: 38°14′3″N 93°21′14″W
- Country: United States
- State: Missouri
- County: Benton
- Townships: Fristoe; Tom

Area
  - Total: 0.54 sq mi (1.40 km^{2})
  - Land: 0.50 sq mi (1.29 km^{2})
  - Water: 0.042 sq mi (0.11 km^{2})
- Elevation: 680 ft (210 m)

Population (2020)
  - Total: 301
  - Density: 605.3/sq mi (233.71/km^{2})
- Time zone: UTC-6 (Central (CST))
  - Summer (DST): UTC-5 (CDT)
- ZIP Code: 65355 (Warsaw)
- Area code: 660
- FIPS code: 29-79288
- GNIS feature ID: 2806384

White Branch is an unincorporated community and census-designated place (CDP) in Benton County, Missouri, United States. It is southwest of the center of the county, on the south side of the Osage River where it is joined from the south by White Branch, a tributary. To the north, across the Osage, is the city of Warsaw, the Benton county seat. U.S. Route 65 forms the western edge of the CDP, leading north through Warsaw 35 miles (56 km) to Sedalia and south 77 miles (124 km) to Springfield.

White Branch was first listed as a CDP prior to the 2020 census. As of the 2020 census, White Branch had a population of 301.

== Demographics ==
Historical population
Census	Pop.	Note	%±
2020	301		—
U.S. Decennial Census

White Branch first appeared as a census designated place in the 2020 U.S. census.
