= Edwards, Missouri =

- Unincorporated community
- Location within Missouri Location within the United States
- Coordinates: 38°08′12″N 93°10′11″W
- Country: United States
- State: Missouri
- County: Benton
- Elevation: 794 ft (242 m)
- Time zone: UTC-6 (Central (CST))
  - Summer (DST): UTC-5 (CDT)
- ZIP code: 65326
- Area code: 660
- GNIS feature ID: 717410

Edwards is an unincorporated community in southeastern Benton County, Missouri, United States. It is located on Route 7, approximately 16 miles (26 km) southeast of Warsaw.

== History ==
A post office was established at Edwards in 1883. The community has the name of a local landowner.

== Education ==
Warsaw R-IX School District operates South Elementary School at Edwards.
