= Ross Creek (Missouri) =

Stream in the American state of Missouri

Ross Creek is a stream in Benton County in the U.S. state of Missouri. It is a tributary to Cole Camp Creek.

The stream headwaters arise at 38°19′27″N 93°08′16″W at an elevation of approximately 980 feet and it flows generally west for about 5.5 miles to its confluence with Cole Camp Creek at 38°19′16″N 93°14′10″W at an elevation of 690 feet. The stream confluence with Cole Camp Creek is approximately one mile north of the community of Edmonson.

Ross Creek has the name of a pioneer settler.

== See also ==
- List of rivers of Missouri
