= Tackner, Missouri =

- Unincorporated community
- Location within Missouri Location within the United States
- Coordinates: 38°14′09″N 93°25′48″W
- Country: United States
- State: Missouri
- County: Benton
- Elevation: 751 ft (229 m)
- Time zone: UTC-6 (Central (CST))
  - Summer (DST): UTC-5 (CDT)
- Area code: 660
- GNIS feature ID: 741310

Tackner is an unincorporated community in Benton County, Missouri, United States. Tackner is located on Missouri Route 7 near the Truman Reservoir, 2.7 miles (4.3 km) west of Warsaw.

A post office called Tackner was established in 1890, and remained in operation until 1911. The community has the name of the original owner of the town site.
