= Rodgers Shelter Archeological Site =

- U.S. National Register of Historic Places
- Location within Missouri Location within the United States
- Nearest city: Right bank of the Pomme de Terre River, 5 miles (8.0 km) by road southwest of Fristoe, Missouri
- Coordinates: 38°05′34″N 93°20′43″W
- Area: 0 acres (0 ha)
- NRHP reference No.: 69000090
- Added to NRHP: June 23, 1969

Rodgers Shelter Archeological Site, also known as the Missouri Archaeological Survey Number 23BE125, is a historic archaeological site located at Warsaw, Benton County, Missouri. It is a terrace level archaeological site along the Pomme de Terre River. The site was excavated by R. Bruce McMillan and Raymond Wood before it was submerged by the U. S. Army Corps of Engineers under the water of the Truman Reservoir. The stone tools from the site belong to Late Paleo-Indian (Dalton) Period, Middle Archaic, Late Archaic, and Woodland Period.

It was listed on the National Register of Historic Places in 1969.
