= Whitakerville, Missouri =

- Unincorporated community
- Location within Missouri Location within the United States
- Coordinates: 38°12′50″N 93°22′16″W
- Country: United States
- State: Missouri
- County: Benton
- Elevation: 843 ft (257 m)
- Time zone: UTC-6 (Central (CST))
  - Summer (DST): UTC-5 (CDT)
- Area code: 660
- GNIS feature ID: 728706

Whitakerville is an unincorporated community in Benton County, Missouri, United States. Whitakerville is located on Missouri Route 83, 2.1 miles (3.4 km) south of Warsaw.

The community most likely was named after the local Whitaker family.
