= Bentonville, Missouri =

- Unincorporated community
- Location within Missouri Location within the United States
- Coordinates: 38°06′02″N 93°26′57″W
- Country: United States
- State: Missouri
- County: Benton
- Elevation: 935 ft (285 m)
- Time zone: UTC-6 (Central (CST))
  - Summer (DST): UTC-5 (CDT)
- Area code: 660
- GNIS feature ID: 740671

Bentonville is an unincorporated community in Benton County, Missouri, United States. Bentonville is located along Missouri Route 83, 10.5 miles (16.9 km) south-southwest of Warsaw.

== History ==
A post office called Bentonville was established in 1890, and remained in operation until 1954. The community was named after Thomas Hart Benton, as is Benton County.
