= Bent Tree Harbor, Missouri =

- Census-designated place
- Location within Missouri Location within the United States
- Coordinates: 38°14′53″N 93°29′42″W
- Country: United States
- State: Missouri
- County: Benton
- Township: Tom

Area
  - Total: 2.26 sq mi (5.86 km^{2})
  - Land: 2.08 sq mi (5.38 km^{2})
  - Water: 0.19 sq mi (0.48 km^{2})
- Elevation: 800 ft (240 m)

Population (2020)
  - Total: 283
  - Density: 136.3/sq mi (52.63/km^{2})
- Time zone: UTC-6 (Central (CST))
  - Summer (DST): UTC-5 (CDT)
- ZIP Code: 65355 (Warsaw)
- Area code: 660
- FIPS code: 29-04864
- GNIS feature ID: 2806383

Bent Tree Harbor is an unincorporated community and census-designated place (CDP) in Benton County, Missouri, United States. As of the 2020 census, Bent Tree Harbor had a population of 283. It is in the western part of the county, on the north side of State Highway Z, 6 miles (10 km) west of Warsaw, the county seat. It is bordered to the northwest and northeast by arms of Harry S. Truman Reservoir on the South Grand River, a tributary of the Osage River.

Bent Tree Harbor was first listed as a CDP prior to the 2020 census.

== Demographics ==
Historical population
Census	Pop.	Note	%±
2020	283		—
U.S. Decennial Census

Bent Tree Harbor first appeared as a census designated place in the 2020 U.S. census.
