= Dell, Missouri =

- Unincorporated community
- Location within Missouri Location within the United States
- Coordinates: 38°10′19″N 93°18′32″W
- Country: United States
- State: Missouri
- County: Benton
- Elevation: 965 ft (294 m)
- Time zone: UTC-6 (Central (CST))
  - Summer (DST): UTC-5 (CDT)
- Area code: 660
- GNIS feature ID: 755545

Dell is an unincorporated community in Benton County, Missouri, United States. Dell is located 6.3 miles (10.1 km) southeast of Warsaw.

A variant name was Dell Delight. A post office called Dell Delight was established in 1866, the name was changed to Dell in 1894, and the post office closed in 1911.
