= Lively, Missouri =

- Unincorporated community
- Location within Missouri Location within the United States
- Coordinates: 38°12′37″N 93°06′29″W
- Country: United States
- State: Missouri
- County: Benton
- Elevation: 669 ft (204 m)
- Time zone: UTC-6 (Central (CST))
  - Summer (DST): UTC-5 (CDT)
- Area code: 660
- GNIS feature ID: 721365

Lively is an unincorporated community in Benton County, Missouri, United States. Lively is located on Knobby Creek, 15.1 miles (24.3 km) east of Warsaw.

A post office called Lively was established in 1900, and remained in operation until 1913. The community was named for its "lively" business district.
