= Byler Branch =

Stream in Benton County, Missouri, U.S.

Coordinates: 38.29362°N 93.2367°W

Byler Branch is a stream in Benton County in the U.S. state of Missouri. It is a tributary of Cole Camp Creek.

Byler Branch most likely derives its name from the surname Byler, which is found in local communities .

== See also ==
- List of rivers of Missouri
