= Edmonson, Missouri =

- Unincorporated community
- Location within Missouri Location within the United States
- Coordinates: 38°18′34″N 93°13′27″W
- Country: United States
- State: Missouri
- County: Benton
- Elevation: 774 ft (236 m)
- Time zone: UTC-6 (Central (CST))
  - Summer (DST): UTC-5 (CDT)
- Area code: 660
- GNIS feature ID: 717409

Edmonson is an unincorporated community in Benton County, Missouri, United States. Edmonson is located at the junction of Supplemental Routes H and W, 8.2 miles (13.2 km) southeast of Lincoln.

A post office called Edmonson was established in 1886, and remained in operation until 1916. The community has the name of a local family.
