= Mossy Creek =

Mossy Creek may refer to:

- Mossy Creek (Chattahoochee River), a stream in Georgia
- Mossy Creek, Georgia, an unincorporated community
- Mossy Creek (Missouri), a stream in Missouri
- Mossy Creek, Virginia, an unincorporated community
- Mossy Creek, a district of Jefferson County, Tennessee, and the site of the Battle of Mossy Creek
