= Avery, Missouri =

- Unincorporated community
- Location within Missouri Location within the United States
- Coordinates: 38°04′04″N 93°21′37″W
- Country: United States
- State: Missouri
- Counties: Benton and Hickory
- Elevation: 797 ft (243 m)
- Time zone: UTC-6 (Central (CST))
  - Summer (DST): UTC-5 (CDT)
- Area code: 660
- GNIS feature ID: 713503

Avery is an unincorporated community that straddles the boundary between Benton County and Hickory County, Missouri, United States. Avery is located on Supplemental Route B, 8.7 miles (14.0 km) north-northeast of Wheatland.

A post office called Avery was established in 1890, moving between businesses in Avery from time to time and thus between counties, remaining in operation until 1897. The community has the name of Henry Avery, a county commissioner.
