= Valley View, Benton County, Missouri =

Valley View, Missouri
- Unincorporated community
- Location within Missouri Location within the United States
- Coordinates: 38°12′22″N 93°25′42″W
- Country: United States
- State: Missouri
- County: Benton
- Elevation: 705 ft (215 m)
- Time zone: UTC-6 (Central (CST))
  - Summer (DST): UTC-5 (CDT)
- Area code: 660
- GNIS feature ID: 728105

Valley View is an unincorporated community in Benton County, Missouri, United States. Valley View is located on a peninsula in the Truman Reservoir, 3.6 miles (5.8 km) southwest of Warsaw.
