= Hastain, Missouri =

- Unincorporated community
- Location within Missouri Location within the United States
- Coordinates: 38°12′07″N 93°10′35″W
- Country: United States
- State: Missouri
- County: Benton
- Elevation: 686 ft (209 m)
- Time zone: UTC-6 (Central (CST))
  - Summer (DST): UTC-5 (CDT)
- Area code: 660
- GNIS feature ID: 740911

Hastain is an unincorporated community in Benton County, Missouri, United States. Hastain is located on Supplemental Route V, 11.5 miles (18.5 km) east-southeast of Warsaw.

A post office called Hastain was established in 1884, and remained in operation until 1951. The community was named after the local Hastain family.
