= Harry S Truman State Park =

State park in Missouri, United States

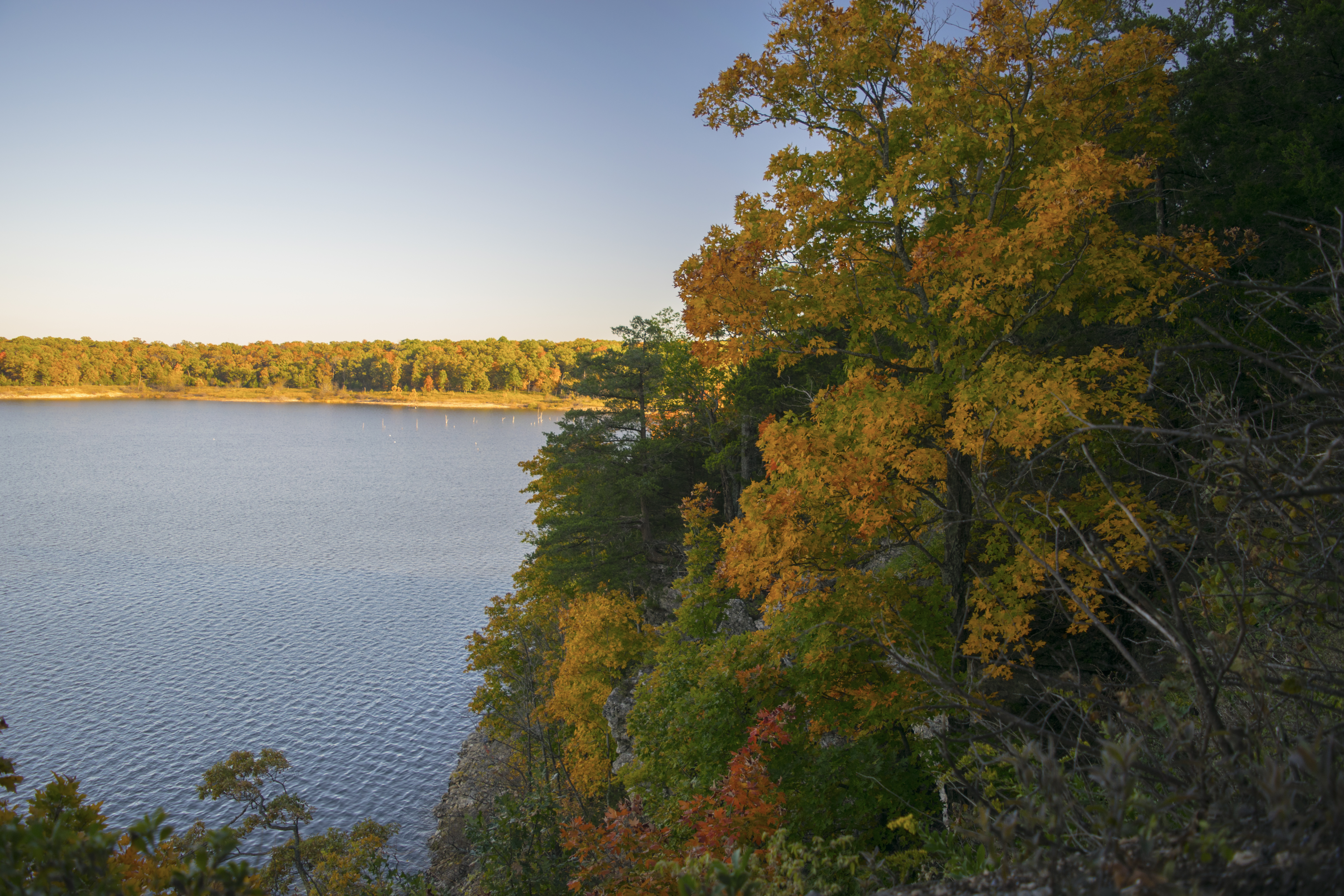
- The park's Bluff Ridge Overlook

- Location within Missouri Location within the United States
- Location: Benton County, Missouri, United States
- Coordinates: 38°16′45″N 93°26′14″W
- Area: 1,440 acres (580 ha)
- Elevation: 778 ft (237 m)
- Established: 1976
- Administrator: Missouri Department of Natural Resources
- Visitors: 152,156 (in 2022)
- Website: Official website

Harry S Truman State Park is a public recreation area occupying 1,440 acres (580 ha) on a peninsula on Truman Lake, a 55,600-acre (22,500 ha) impoundment of the Osage River, near Warsaw, Missouri. The state park offers boating, fishing, swimming, hiking trails, and campgrounds.
