= Palo Pinto, Missouri =

- Unincorporated community
- Location within Missouri Location within the United States
- Coordinates: 38°22′54″N 93°27′20″W
- Country: United States
- State: Missouri
- County: Benton
- Elevation: 817 ft (249 m)
- Time zone: UTC-6 (Central (CST))
  - Summer (DST): UTC-5 (CDT)
- Area code: 660
- GNIS feature ID: 741137

Palo Pinto is an unincorporated community in Benton County, Missouri, United States. Palo Pinto is located 6.6 miles (10.6 km) west of Lincoln.

== History ==
Palo Pinto was founded in 1876. A post office called Palo Pinto was established in 1877, and remained in operation until 1904. The name may be a transfer from Palo Pinto County, Texas.
