= Mossy Creek (Missouri) =

Stream in the American state of Missouri

Mossy Creek is a stream in Benton County in the U.S. state of Missouri. It is a tributary to the Osage River within the Lake of the Ozarks.

The stream headwaters arise just east of Missouri Route M at 38°12′58″N 93°13′02″W and about two miles west-northwest of the community of Hastain. The stream flows north then east paralleling Route M to its confluence with the Osage south of Lakeview Heights at 38°15′04″N 93°09′51″W.

Mossy Creek was so named on account of wetlands along its course.

== See also ==
- List of rivers of Missouri
