= James L. Mathewson =

American politician (1938–2021)

Jim Mathewson

Member of the Missouri Senate
- In office 1980–2005

Member of the Missouri House of Representatives
- In office 1974–1978

Personal details
- Born: James Lee Mathewson; March 16, 1938 Fristoe, Missouri, U.S.
- Died: September 27, 2021 (aged 83) Sedalia, Missouri, U.S.
- Party: Democratic
- Spouse: Doris H. Angel Mathewson (m. 1956; died 2017)

Military service
- Branch/service: United States Army

James L. "Jim" Mathewson (March 16, 1938 – September 27, 2021) was an American politician who served in the Missouri Senate and the Missouri House of Representatives.

== Early life and education ==
Born in Fristoe, Missouri, Mathewson graduated from public schools from Warsaw. He attended Redding Junior College (now Shasta College) and California State University, Chico.

== Career ==
He was the owner of a real estate appraisal firm and a broadcasting company. Matthewson served in the United States Army. He and his wife operated a restaurant until it was burned down in a fire. He served as a member of the Missouri House of Representatives from 1974 to 1978 and the Missouri Senate from 1980 to 2005.

Following his time in the legislature, Mathewson served on the Missouri State Fair Commission and the Missouri Gaming Commission.

== Personal life and death ==
His wife Doris H. Angel Mathewson, a native of Sedalia, Missouri, died June 14, 2017. They were married for more than 50 years.

Mathewson died at his home in Sedalia, Missouri, on September 27, 2021, of cancer.
