= Crockerville, Missouri =

- Unincorporated community
- Location within Missouri Location within the United States
- Coordinates: 38°26′34″N 93°06′16″W
- Country: United States
- State: Missouri
- County: Benton
- Elevation: 1,024 ft (312 m)
- Time zone: UTC-6 (Central (CST))
  - Summer (DST): UTC-5 (CDT)
- Area code: 660
- GNIS feature ID: 740778

Crockerville is an unincorporated community in Benton County, Missouri, United States. Crockerville is located along Missouri Route 52, 5.5 miles (8.9 km) east-southeast of Cole Camp.
