= Duran Creek =

Stream in the American state of Missouri

Coordinates: 38°19′00″N 93°14′01″W

Duran Creek (also spelled Duren Creek) is a stream in Benton County in the U.S. state of Missouri. It is a tributary of Cole Camp Creek.

Duran Creek was named after Mannen Duren, an early settler.

Bird Branch and Lemon Branch flow into this creek.

== See also ==
- List of rivers of Missouri
