= Lake Creek, Missouri =

- Unincorporated community
- Location within Missouri Location within the United States
- Coordinates: 38°30′41″N 93°08′01″W
- Country: United States
- State: Missouri
- County: Benton
- Elevation: 974 ft (297 m)
- Time zone: UTC-6 (Central (CST))
  - Summer (DST): UTC-5 (CDT)
- Area code: 660
- GNIS feature ID: 729760

Lake Creek is an unincorporated community in Benton County, Missouri, United States. Lake Creek is located along Supplemental Route JJ, 5.2 miles (8.4 km) northeast of Cole Camp.

Lake Creek takes its name from a stream which once had sloughs and small lakes located along it.
