= Jeremy Eierman =

American baseball player (born 1996)

- Shortstop
- Born: September 10, 1996 (age 30); Sedalia, Missouri, U.S.
- Bats: Right Throws: Right
- Stats at Baseball Reference

Jeremy Austin Eierman (born September 10, 1996) is an American former professional baseball shortstop. He played college baseball for the Missouri State Bears.

== Amateur career ==
Eierman attended Warsaw High School in Warsaw, Missouri, and played on their baseball team. As a senior, he batted .542 with eight home runs, 33 RBIs, and 18 stolen bases in 26 games. He was also named Missouri's Gatorade Baseball Player of the Year as a senior. After graduating in 2015, he enrolled at Missouri State University where he played college baseball.

As a freshman in 2016 for the Bears, Eierman started in 59 games at shortstop and batted .296 while slugging .504 with nine home runs and 48 RBIs, earning him a spot on the Louisville Slugger All-American Freshman team. In his 2017 sophomore season, he started all 63 of Missouri State's games and slashed .313/.431/.675 with 23 home runs, 68 RBIs, 15 doubles, and 17 stolen bases. After the season, he was named to the All-Missouri Valley First Team. He was also named a first team All-American by D1Baseball and Perfect Game. In 2016 and 2017, he played collegiate summer baseball with the Bourne Braves of the Cape Cod Baseball League.

Eierman was named to Collegiate Baseball's 2018 preseason All-American team and to the Missouri Valley Conference 2018 preseason first team, along with being selected as a preseason first team All-American shortstop by both D1Baseball and Perfect Game prior to the 2018 season. He was named to the All-Missouri Valley Second Team. He ended 2018, his junior year, batting .287 with ten home runs, 49 RBIs, and 21 stolen bases in 56 games.

== Professional career ==
Eierman was selected in the second round with the 70th overall selection by the Oakland Athletics in the 2018 Major League Baseball draft. On June 15, 2018, he signed with Oakland for a $1,232,000 signing bonus. Eierman made his professional debut with the Vermont Lake Monsters of the Low-A New York–Penn League, batting .235 with eight home runs, 26 RBI, and ten stolen bases in 62 games. He spent 2019 with the Stockton Ports of the High-A California League, slashing .208/.270/.357 with 13 home runs and 64 RBI over 131 games. Eierman did not play in a game in 2020 due to the cancellation of the minor league season because of the COVID-19 pandemic.

For the 2021 season, Eierman was assigned to the Midland RockHounds of the Double-A Central. He was placed on the injured list in mid-July with a quad strain and missed the remainder of the year. Over sixty appearances, he slashed .247/.335/.448 with ten home runs and thirty RBI. Eierman was selected to play in the Arizona Fall League for the Mesa Solar Sox after the season. He returned to Midland for the 2022 season; over 72 games, he hit .203 with 14 home runs and 44 RBI.

Eierman spent the majority of the 2023 season with Midland, also appearing in one game for the rookie-level Arizona Complex League Athletics; in 36 games for the RockHounds, he batted .188/.295/.305 with three home runs, six RBI, and four stolen bases. In 2024, he made 76 appearances split between the ACL Athletics and Midland, slashing a cumulative .232/.297/.419 with 13 home runs, 39 RBI, and two stolen bases. Eierman elected free agency following the season on November 6, 2024.

== Personal life ==
Eierman's father, John Eierman, was an outfielder in the Boston Red Sox organization. His older brother, Johnny Eierman, was drafted in the third round of the 2011 MLB draft by the Tampa Bay Rays and played on the University of Missouri football team.
