= Alexander Township =

Alexander Township may refer to:

- Alexander Township, Benton County, Missouri
- Alexander Township, Stutsman County, North Dakota, in Stutsman County, North Dakota
- Alexander Township, Athens County, Ohio
