= Majorville, Missouri =

- Unincorporated community
- Location within Missouri Location within the United States
- Coordinates: 38°10′55″N 93°16′12″W
- Country: United States
- State: Missouri
- County: Benton
- Elevation: 906 ft (276 m)
- Time zone: UTC-6 (Central (CST))
  - Summer (DST): UTC-5 (CDT)
- Area code: 660
- GNIS feature ID: 741038

Majorville is an unincorporated community in Benton County, Missouri, United States. Majorville is located on Supplemental Route PP, 7.4 miles (11.9 km) southeast of Warsaw.

The community most likely was named after the local Major family.
