= Bird Branch =

Stream in the American state of Missouri

Coordinates: 38°19′42″N 93°18′47″W

Bird Branch is a stream in Benton County in the U.S. state of Missouri. It is a tributary of Duran Creek.

Bird Branch owes its name to the Bird family of settlers.

== See also ==
- List of rivers of Missouri
