= North Lindsey =

North Lindsey may refer to:

- North Lindsey College, college in Scunthorpe, North Lincolnshire, England
- North Lindsey Light Railway, light railway in North Lincolnshire, England
- North Lindsey Township, Benton County, Missouri, US
