= Crest, Missouri =

- Unincorporated community
- Location within Missouri Location within the United States
- Coordinates: 38°27′01″N 93°08′06″W
- Country: United States
- State: Missouri
- County: Benton
- Elevation: 1,083 ft (330 m)
- Time zone: UTC-6 (Central (CST))
  - Summer (DST): UTC-5 (CDT)
- Area code: 660
- GNIS feature ID: 740776

Crest is an unincorporated community in Benton County, Missouri, United States. Crest is located 3.7 miles (6.0 km) east of Cole Camp.

The community was so named on account of its lofty elevation.
