= Lakeview Heights, Missouri =

- Unincorporated community
- Location within Missouri Location within the United States
- Coordinates: 38°15′32″N 93°09′23″W
- Country: United States
- State: Missouri
- County: Benton
- Elevation: 787 ft (240 m)
- Time zone: UTC-6 (Central (CST))
  - Summer (DST): UTC-5 (CDT)
- Area code: 660
- GNIS feature ID: 720764

Lakeview Heights is an unincorporated community in Benton County, Missouri, United States. Lakeview Heights is located on the Osage River, 12.3 miles (19.8 km) east of Warsaw.

A post office called Lakeview Heights was established in 1932, and remained in operation until 1955. The community was named for its location near Lake of the Ozarks.
