= Yazoo stream =

Hydrologic term

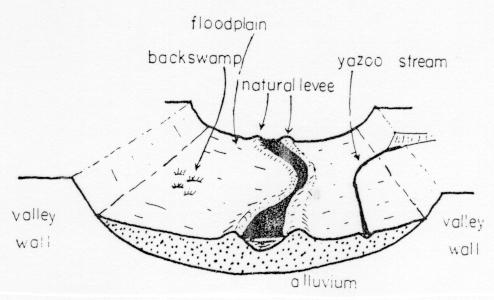
Yazoo stream

In geology and hydrology, a Yazoo stream (also called a Yazoo tributary) is any tributary stream that runs parallel to, and within the floodplain of a larger river for considerable distance, before eventually joining it. This is especially the characteristic when such a stream is forced to flow along the base of the main river's natural levee. Where the two meet is known as a "belated confluence" or a "deferred junction". The name is derived from an exterminated Native American tribe, the Yazoo Indians. The Choctaw word is translated to "River of Death" because of the strong flows under its bank full stage.

== Examples ==
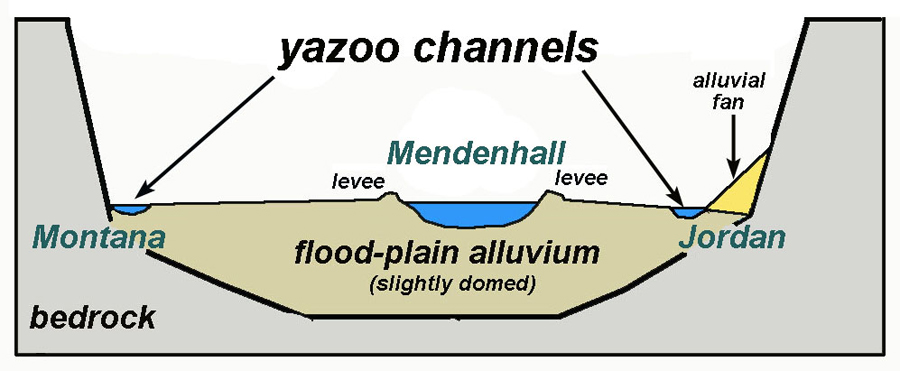
Montana and Jordan Creeks

=== Yazoo River ===
Yazoo River runs parallel to the Mississippi River for 280 km (170 mi) before converging, being constrained from doing so upstream by the river's natural and man-made levees.

=== Mossy Creek ===
Moesian stream/flow is a parallel derivative remnant of paleoriver. Many Yazoo streams are actually paleo-remnants of just one original river. The good examples of moesian flow are Mossy Creek, Missouri and Jezava, Morava.

=== Montana and Jordan creeks ===
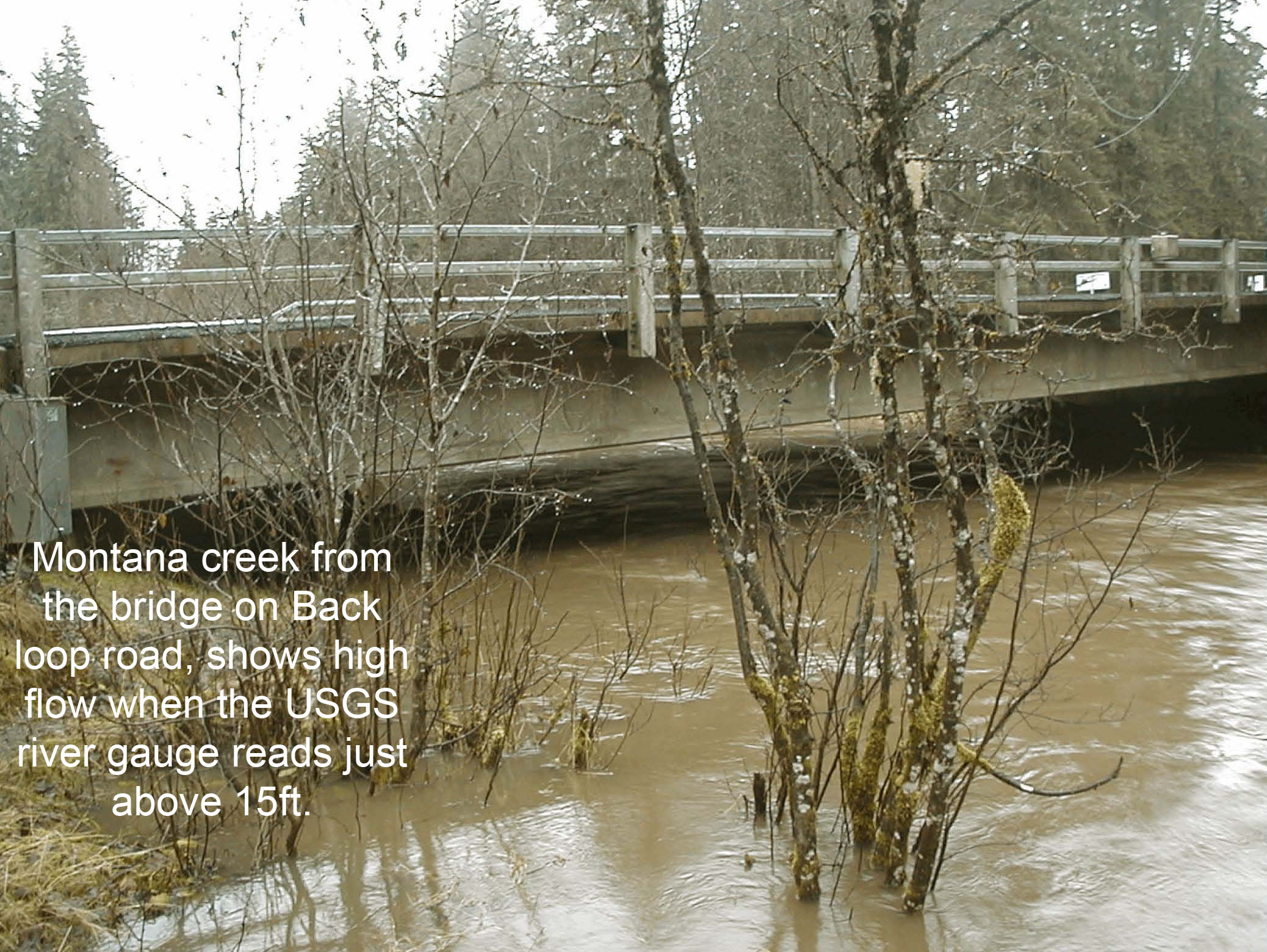
Montana Creek, bankfull stage

Important salmonoid fish habitat and large spruce forests inhabit these streams which flow into the Mendenhall River in Alaska.

=== Tributaries of the Wakarusa River ===
Yazoo streams here drain the back swamps of the Wakarusa River Valley.

== Formation ==
=== Natural levees ===
Over time, the main river flows through the landscape, widening a valley and creating a floodplain. Sediment accumulates and creates a natural levee. Tributaries that want to enter the main channel are not allowed because of this levee. Instead, the water then enters the back swamps, or forms a yazoo stream. Because yazoo streams are separated from the main river by natural levees, they flow and meander (streams and rivers rarely flow in straight lines) parallel to the main stream channel or river on the floodplain for a considerable distance. These series of smooth bends or curves flows with a slight gradient, and is normally blocked from entering by a natural levee along the larger stream. A yazoo stream will join the major river where it will eventually break through the natural levees and flow into the larger waterway at its belated confluence.

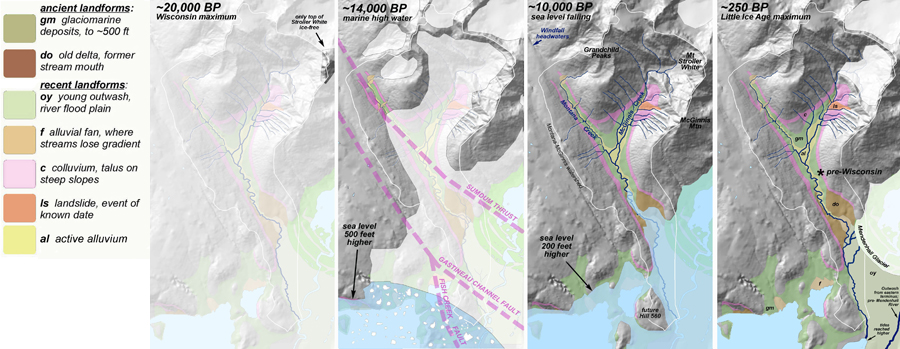
Mendenhall Glacier

Yazoo stream formation can also be influenced by glacial processes. An example is the formation of the Montana Creek valley during the recent Little Ice Age. The Mendenhall Glacier carved out a wide floodplain that is domed in the center. High valley walls due to tectonic uplift and glacial outwash (the natural levee) create two yazoo streams that parallel the Mendenhall River.

== Flooding and human influence ==
Floods are a major driving force for yazoo streams. In the Yazoo Basin, settlers were faced with high waters for most of the year, making it hard for building homes and maintaining agriculture. A few man-made levees were built to improve conditions. In 1927, large floods ravaged the area, allowing Congress to take action into building dams and more levees to reduce the risk of floods.

Human alteration within wetlands and streams have resulted in a decrease in ecological functions and associated benefits to society. Miles of streams are in poor condition with high nitrogen and phosphorus concentrations. Yazoo streams have been altered through intense agricultural activities and flood control measures. Low water, excessive sedimentation, and the accumulation of pesticides such as DDT are the consequences of human disturbances.
