= Mount Hulda, Missouri =

Unincorporated community in Missouri, U.S.

Coordinates: 38.360857°N 93.180479°W

Mount Hulda is an unincorporated community in Benton County, in the U.S. state of Missouri.

== History ==
An early variant name was Hulda. A post office called Hulda was established in 1904, the name was changed to Mount Hulda in 1916, and the post office closed in 1924. The origin of the name Mount Hulda is obscure.
