= South Lindsey Township, Benton County, Missouri =

Township in Missouri

Coordinates: 38.2633°N 93.3589°W

South Lindsey Township is a township in Benton County, in the U.S. state of Missouri. Feaster Branch drains into the Lake of the Ozarks here.

South Lindsey Township takes its name from Judge John W. Lindsay, who sat on the County Court bench.
