= Feaster Branch =

Stream in Benton County, Missouri

Coordinates: 38.2800253°N 93.2852028°W

Feaster Branch is a stream in Benton County in the U.S. state of Missouri, which drains into the Lake of the Ozarks in South Lindsey Township.

Feaster Branch has the name of a pioneer citizen.

== See also ==
- List of rivers of Missouri
