= Knobby Creek =

Stream in the US state of Missouri

Knobby Creek is a stream in Benton County in the U.S. state of Missouri. It is a tributary of the Osage River within the Lake of the Ozarks.

The stream headwaters arise at 38°10′40″N 93°04′56″W at an elevation of approximately 920 feet one half mile southeast of Walkers Corner. The stream initially flows to the southwest then turns and flows to the north after crossing under Missouri Route OO. The stream crosses under Route OO again as it passes the community of Lively just prior to entering the waters of the Lake of the Ozarks. The confluence with the Lake is at 38°12′51″N 93°06′38″W at an elevation of 676 feet.

Knobby Creek was named for the rounded hills or knobs along its course. It has also been called Beaver Creek.

== See also ==
- List of rivers of Missouri
