= Tom Township, Benton County, Missouri =

Township in Benton County, Missouri, U.S.

Coordinates: 38.2522°N 93.4514°W

Tom Township is a township in Benton County, in the U.S. state of Missouri. It contains the census-designated place of Bent Tree Harbor and part of White Branch.

Tom Township was formed on April 2, 1842, taking its name from Tom Bishop, who was court clerk, when the township was organized.
