= Valleyview =

Valleyview may refer to:

== Places ==
- Valleyview, Ohio, US
- Valleyview, Alberta, Canada
- Valleyview, Kamloops, Canada, BC
- Valleyview Provincial Park, in the list of provincial parks in Nova Scotia, Canada

== Schools ==
- Valleyview Elementary School (disambiguation)
- Valleyview Centennial School (Brandon, Manitoba), Canada

== Other uses ==
- Valleyview (microarchitecture), used in Intel Atom processors

== See also ==
- Valley View (disambiguation)
