= Racket, Missouri =

- Unincorporated community
- Location within Missouri Location within the United States
- Coordinates: 38°17′36″N 93°29′32″W
- Country: United States
- State: Missouri
- County: Benton
- Elevation: 843 ft (257 m)
- Time zone: UTC-6 (Central (CST))
  - Summer (DST): UTC-5 (CDT)
- Area code: 660
- GNIS feature ID: 741184

Racket is an unincorporated community in Benton County, Missouri, United States. Racket is located along Missouri Route 7, 6.9 miles (11.1 km) west-northwest of Warsaw.
