= Fristoe, Missouri =

- Unincorporated community
- Location within Missouri Location within the United States
- Coordinates: 38°07′00″N 93°16′33″W
- Country: United States
- State: Missouri
- County: Benton
- Elevation: 971 ft (296 m)
- Time zone: UTC-6 (Central (CST))
  - Summer (DST): UTC-5 (CDT)
- Area code: 417
- GNIS feature ID: 718254

Fristoe is an unincorporated community in Benton County, Missouri, United States. Fristoe is located at the junction of U.S. Route 65 and Supplemental Route CC, 10.45 miles (16.82 km) southeast of Warsaw.

The Pomme de Terre River arm of Harry S Truman Reservoir lies approximately four miles to the west along Missouri Route CC.

== History ==
A post office called Fristoe was established in 1895, and remained in operation until 1978. The community was named for Judge Markham Fristoe, an early member of the county court.

The Rodgers Shelter Archeological Site was listed on the National Register of Historic Places in 1969.

== Notable person ==
- James L. Mathewson, Missouri state senator and Missouri state representative
