= Fristoe Township, Benton County, Missouri =

Township in the US state of Missouri

Coordinates: 38.1681°N 93.2892°W

Fristoe Township is a township in Benton County, in the U.S. state of Missouri. It contains part of the census-designated place of White Branch.

Fristoe Township was formed on June 18, 1845, taking its name from Judge Markham Fristoe, then on the County Court Bench.
