= Union Township, Benton County, Missouri =

Township in the US state of Missouri

Coordinates: 38.1606°N 93.1614°W

Union Township is a township in Benton County, in the U.S. state of Missouri.

Union Township was formed on June 2, 1840, named because it united parts of three previous townships.
