= Alexander Township, Benton County, Missouri =

Township in the US state of Missouri

Coordinates: 38.1317°N 93.4217°W

Alexander Township is a township in Benton County, in the U.S. state of Missouri.

Alexander Township was formed on February 13, 1838, taking its name from Judge George Alexander, who settled on Turkey Creek in 1832.
