= White Township, Benton County, Missouri =

Township in Benton County, Missouri, U.S.

Coordinates: 38.4408°N 93.4011°W

White Township is a township in Benton County, in the U.S. state of Missouri. It has an area of 114.6 square miles (297 km^{2}) and had a population of 2,474 in 2021.

White Township was formed on November 12, 1838, taking its name from Judge William White, one of the first settlers, and then county judge.
