= Valley View School District =

Valley View School District may refer to a school district in the United States:

- Valley View School District (Arkansas)
- Valley View School District (Illinois)
- Valley View School District (Pennsylvania)
- Valley View Independent School District (Cooke County, Texas)
- Valley View Independent School District (Hidalgo County, Texas)
- Valley View Local School District (Ohio)

== See also ==
- Vallivue School District (Idaho)
