= Valley View Middle School =

Valley View Middle School may refer to:

- Valley View Middle School (Edina, Minnesota)
- Valley View Middle School (Pleasant Hill, California)
- Valley View Middle School (Snohomish, Washington)
