= North Lindsey Township, Benton County, Missouri =

Township in the US state of Missouri

Coordinates: 38.3308°N 93.3939°W

North Lindsey Township is a township in Benton County, in the U.S. state of Missouri.

North Lindsey Township takes its name from Judge John W. Lindsay, who sat on the County Court bench.
