= Warsaw High School (Missouri) =

Location
- 20363 Lane of Champions; Warsaw, Missouri 65355; United States; 38.2201°N 93.3354°W

Information
- Type: Public
- Motto: Pride, tradition, excellence
- School district: Warsaw R-IX School District
- Principal: Danny Morrison
- Staff: 26.46 (on an FTE basis)
- Enrollment: 396 (2023-2024)
- Student to teacher ratio: 14.97
- Colours: Green and black
- Athletics conference: Ozark Mountain Conference
- Mascot: Wildcat
- Website: whs.warsawk12.org

Warsaw High School is a public four-year high school located in the Truman Lake/Lake of the Ozarks area. It is located out of town on Lane of Champions by the intersection Wildcat Drive and highway 83. It is the only high school in the Warsaw R-IX School district. The original building had a Middle school built on to it.

Warsaw High School, or WHS, serves the communities of Warsaw, Edwards, Tightwad, Fristoe, and Cross timbers. Warsaw High School is home to a Taco Bell teacher finalist, Jowell Roellig. She was voted as one of the top ten teachers in the United States in 2016.

== Notable alumni ==
- Jeremy Eierman, American professional baseball shortstop in the Oakland Athletics organization who played college baseball for the Missouri State Bears
- Jerry Lumpe, American professional baseball player (a second baseman, third baseman and shortstop), who appeared in 1,371 games over 12 seasons (1956–1967) for the New York Yankees, Kansas City Athletics and Detroit Tigers of Major League Baseball
