= Valley View Public School =

Valley View Public School may refer to:

Canada:

- Valley View Public School, Ajax, Ontario; see Durham District School Board
- Valley View Public School, Val Caron, Ontario; see Rainbow District School Board
