= Lincoln, Missouri =

City in Benton County, Missouri, United States

- City
- Motto: "A Great Place to Call Home"
- Location of Lincoln, Missouri
- Coordinates: 38°23′38″N 93°19′53″W
- Country: United States
- State: Missouri
- County: Benton
- Incorporated: 1869

Area
  - Total: 0.98 sq mi (2.55 km^{2})
  - Land: 0.95 sq mi (2.46 km^{2})
  - Water: 0.035 sq mi (0.09 km^{2})
- Elevation: 948 ft (289 m)

Population (2020)
  - Total: 1,144
  - Density: 1,205.1/sq mi (465.29/km^{2})
- Time zone: UTC-6 (Central (CST))
  - Summer (DST): UTC-5 (CDT)
- ZIP code: 65338
- Area code: 660
- FIPS code: 29-42608
- GNIS feature ID: 2395712
- Website: www.lincolnmissouri.com

Lincoln is a city in Benton County, Missouri, United States. The population was 1,144 at the 2020 census.

== History ==
A post office called Lincoln was established in 1866. The city was named for Abraham Lincoln, sixteenth President of the United States.

== Geography ==
Lincoln is located at 38°23′32″N 93°19′58″W (38.392258, -93.332766).

According to the United States Census Bureau, the city has a total area of 0.98 square miles (2.54 km^{2}), of which 0.95 square miles (2.46 km^{2}) is land and 0.03 square miles (0.08 km^{2}) is water.

== Demographics ==
Historical population
Census	Pop.	Note	%±
1880	102		—
1900	357		—
1910	336		−5.9%
1920	345		2.7%
1930	338		−2.0%
1940	379		12.1%
1950	316		−16.6%
1960	446		41.1%
1970	574		28.7%
1980	819		42.7%
1990	874		6.7%
2000	1,026		17.4%
2010	1,190		16.0%
2020	1,144		−3.9%
U.S. Decennial Census

As of 2000 the median income for a household in the city was $25,595, and the median income for a family was $35,217. Males had a median income of $26,667 versus $17,500 for females. The per capita income for the city was $13,803. About 6.1% of families and 10.2% of the population were below the poverty line, including 15.4% of those under age 18 and 9.3% of those age 65 or over.

=== 2010 census ===
As of the census of 2010, there were 1,190 people, 478 households, and 298 families residing in the city. The population density was 1,252.6 inhabitants per square mile (483.6/km^{2}). There were 524 housing units at an average density of 551.6 per square mile (213.0/km^{2}). The racial makeup of the city was 97.6% White, 0.1% African American, 0.8% Native American, 0.3% Asian, 0.1% Pacific Islander, 0.2% from other races, and 0.9% from two or more races. Hispanic or Latino of any race were 1.1% of the population.

There were 478 households, of which 32.0% had children under the age of 18 living with them, 47.7% were married couples living together, 10.5% had a female householder with no husband present, 4.2% had a male householder with no wife present, and 37.7% were non-families. 31.2% of all households were made up of individuals, and 20.3% had someone living alone who was 65 years of age or older. The average household size was 2.37 and the average family size was 2.96.

The median age in the city was 41.1 years. 25.6% of residents were under the age of 18; 7.9% were between the ages of 18 and 24; 19.8% were from 25 to 44; 21.6% were from 45 to 64; and 25% were 65 years of age or older. The gender makeup of the city was 44.4% male and 55.6% female.
