= Cole Camp Creek =

Stream in Missouri, United States

Coordinates: 38°15′38″N 93°12′33″W

Location
- Country: United States
- State: Missouri
- County: Benton

Physical characteristics
- Mouth: Osage River arm of the Lake of the Ozarks

Cole Camp Creek is a stream in Benton County in the U.S. state of Missouri. It is a tributary of the Osage River arm of the Lake of the Ozarks.

Cole Camp Creek most likely was named after Stephen Cole, an early settler, although folk etymology maintains deposits of coal in the area account for the name. Mining equipment travel and in-stream gravel mining caused bank erosion and no flowing water in Cole Camp Creek.

== See also ==
- List of rivers of Missouri
