= Benton County, Missouri =

County in Missouri, United States

- County
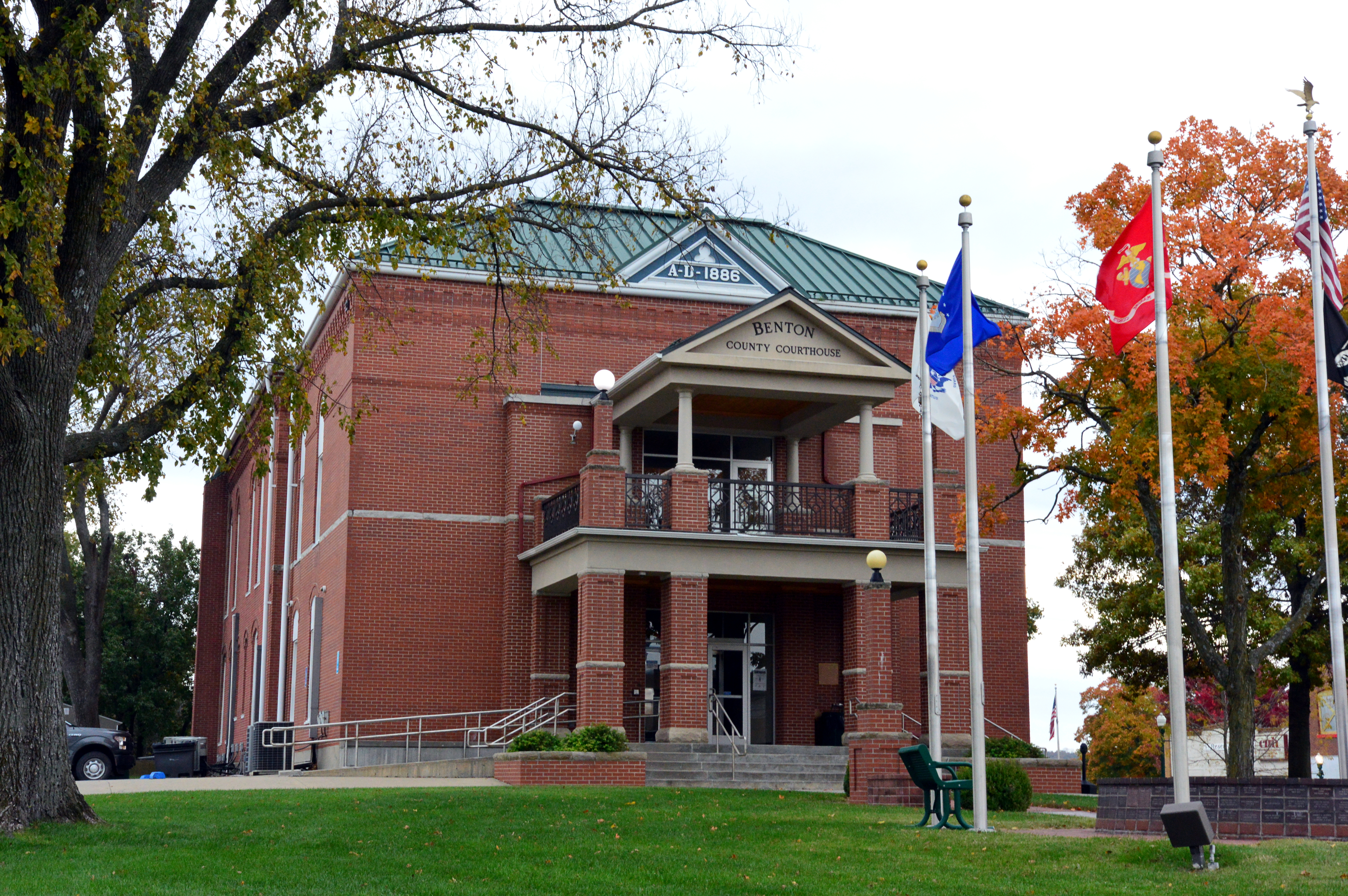
- The Benton County Courthouse in Warsaw

- Location within the U.S. state of Missouri
- Coordinates: 38°18′N 93°17′W
- Country: United States
- State: Missouri
- Founded: January 3, 1835
- Named for: Thomas Hart Benton
- Seat: Warsaw
- Largest city: Warsaw

Area
  - Total: 753 sq mi (1,950 km^{2})
  - Land: 704 sq mi (1,820 km^{2})
  - Water: 48 sq mi (120 km^{2}) 6.4%

Population (2020)
  - Total: 19,394
  - Estimate (2025): 20,536 ▲
  - Density: 27.5/sq mi (10.6/km^{2})
- Time zone: UTC−6 (Central)
  - Summer (DST): UTC−5 (CDT)
- Congressional district: 4th
- Website: www.bentoncomo.com

Benton County is a county located in the west central part of the U.S. state of Missouri. The population was 19,394 as of the 2020 Census. Its county seat is Warsaw. The county was organized January 3, 1835, and named for U.S. Senator Thomas Hart Benton of Missouri.

== Geography ==
According to the U.S. Census Bureau, the county has a total area of 753 square miles (1,950 km^{2}), of which 704 square miles (1,820 km^{2}) is land and 48 square miles (120 km^{2}) (6.4%) is water.

=== Adjacent counties ===
- Pettis County (north)
- Morgan County (northeast)
- Camden County (southeast)
- Hickory County (south)
- St. Clair County(southwest)
- Henry County (west)

=== Major highways ===
- U.S. Route 65
- Route 7
- Route 83
- Route 82
- Route 52

== Demographics ==
Historical population
Census	Pop.	Note	%±
1840	4,205		—
1850	5,015		19.3%
1860	9,072		80.9%
1870	11,322		24.8%
1880	12,396		9.5%
1890	14,973		20.8%
1900	16,556		10.6%
1910	14,881		−10.1%
1920	12,989		−12.7%
1930	11,708		−9.9%
1940	11,142		−4.8%
1950	9,080		−18.5%
1960	8,737		−3.8%
1970	9,695		11.0%
1980	12,183		25.7%
1990	13,859		13.8%
2000	17,180		24.0%
2010	19,056		10.9%
2020	19,394		1.8%
2025 (est.)	20,536	▲	5.9%
U.S. Decennial Census; 1790-1960 1900-1990; 1990-2000 2010-2015 2019

=== 2020 census ===
As of the 2020 census, the county had a population of 19,394. The median age was 53.8 years. 17.9% of residents were under the age of 18 and 30.7% of residents were 65 years of age or older. For every 100 females there were 102.0 males, and for every 100 females age 18 and over there were 101.0 males age 18 and over. 0.0% of residents lived in urban areas, while 100.0% lived in rural areas.

The racial makeup of the county was 93.0% White, 0.4% Black or African American, 0.6% American Indian and Alaska Native, 0.3% Asian, 0.0% Native Hawaiian and Pacific Islander, 0.5% from some other race, and 5.2% from two or more races. Hispanic or Latino residents of any race comprised 1.6% of the population.

There were 8,525 households in the county, of which 20.3% had children under the age of 18 living with them and 21.9% had a female householder with no spouse or partner present. About 31.3% of all households were made up of individuals and 17.7% had someone living alone who was 65 years of age or older.

There were 13,551 housing units, of which 37.1% were vacant. Among occupied housing units, 80.4% were owner-occupied and 19.6% were renter-occupied. The homeowner vacancy rate was 2.6% and the rental vacancy rate was 7.3%.

Benton County, Missouri – Racial and ethnic composition Note: the US Census treats Hispanic/Latino as an ethnic category. This table excludes Latinos from the racial categories and assigns them to a separate category. Hispanics/Latinos may be of any race.
Race / Ethnicity (NH = Non-Hispanic)	Pop 1980	Pop 1990	Pop 2000	Pop 2010	Pop 2020	% 1980	% 1990	% 2000	% 2010	% 2020
White alone (NH)	12,035	13,677	16,709	18,311	17,934	98.79%	98.69%	97.26%	96.09%	92.47%
Black or African American alone (NH)	14	13	24	56	75	0.11%	0.09%	0.14%	0.29%	0.39%
Native American or Alaska Native alone (NH)	59	75	89	105	100	0.48%	0.54%	0.52%	0.55%	0.52%
Asian alone (NH)	16	16	21	53	51	0.13%	0.12%	0.12%	0.28%	0.26%
Native Hawaiian or Pacific Islander alone (NH)	x	x	2	5	0	x	x	0.01%	0.03%	0.00%
Other race alone (NH)	7	0	3	7	44	0.06%	0.00%	0.02%	0.04%	0.23%
Mixed race or Multiracial (NH)	x	x	179	228	880	x	x	1.04%	1.20%	4.54%
Hispanic or Latino (any race)	52	78	153	291	310	0.43%	0.56%	0.89%	1.53%	1.60%
Total	12,183	13,859	17,180	19,056	19,394	100.00%	100.00%	100.00%	100.00%	100.00%

=== 2000 census ===
As of the census of 2000, there were 17,180 people, 7,420 households, and 5,179 families residing in the county. The population density was 24 people per square mile (9.3 people/km^{2}). There were 12,691 housing units at an average density of 18 units per square mile (6.9/km^{2}). The racial makeup of the county was 97.96% White, 0.15% Black or African American, 0.53% Native American, 0.13% Asian, 0.01% Pacific Islander, 0.12% from other races, and 1.10% from two or more races. Approximately 0.89% of the population were Hispanic or Latino of any race.

There were 7,420 households, out of which 23.20% had children under the age of 18 living with them, 59.60% were married couples living together, 6.80% had a female householder with no husband present, and 30.20% were non-families. 26.30% of all households were made up of individuals, and 13.80% had someone living alone who was 65 years of age or older. The average household size was 2.28 and the average family size was 2.72.

In the county, the population was spread out, with 20.50% under the age of 18, 5.70% from 18 to 24, 21.80% from 25 to 44, 29.70% from 45 to 64, and 22.30% who were 65 years of age or older. The median age was 46 years. For every 100 females there were 98.20 males. For every 100 females age 18 and over, there were 96.70 males.

The median income for a household in the county was $26,646, and the median income for a family was $32,459. Males had a median income of $26,203 versus $19,054 for females. The per capita income for the county was $15,457. About 10.20% of families and 15.70% of the population were below the poverty line, including 24.50% of those under age 18 and 9.60% of those age 65 or over.

=== Religion ===
According to the Association of Religion Data Archives County Membership Report (2010), Benton County is a part of the Bible Belt, with evangelical Protestantism being the most predominant religion. The most predominant denominations among residents in Benton County who adhere to a religion are Southern Baptists (38.72%), Lutherans (LCMS) (19.06%), and United Methodists (14.49%).

== Education ==
=== Public schools ===
- Cole Camp R-I School District – Cole Camp
  - Cole Camp Elementary School (PK-05)
  - Cole Camp Middle School (06-08)
  - Cole Camp High School (09-12)
- Lincoln R-II School District – Lincoln
  - Lincoln Elementary School (K-06)
  - Lincoln High School (07-12)
- Warsaw R-IX School District – Warsaw
  - North Elementary School (PK-05)
  - South Elementary School (PK-05)
  - John Boise Middle School (06-08)
  - Warsaw High School (09-12)

=== Private schools ===
- Cornerstone Academy of the Ozarks - Warsaw (PK-12) - Interdenominational Christian
- Lutheran School Association – Cole Camp (K-08) – Lutheran
- Most of the students who attend Cole Camp's Lutheran School Association attend Benton County R-1 High in Cole Camp.

=== Public libraries ===
- Boonslick Regional Library

== Politics ==
=== Local ===
The Republican Party controls politics at the local level in Benton County. Republicans hold every elected position in the county.

Benton County, Missouri

Elected countywide officials
Assessor	Jim Hansen	Republican
Circuit Clerk	Cheryl Schultz	Republican
County Clerk	Susan Porterfield	Republican
Collector	David Brodersen	Republican
Commissioner (presiding)	Steve Daleske	Republican
Commissioner (district 1)	Scott Harms	Republican
Commissioner (district 2)	Larry Berry	Republican
Coroner	J. Weston Miller	Republican
Prosecuting Attorney	Karen Coffey Woodley	Republican
Public Administrator	Lori Dunkin	Republican
Recorder	Carla Brown	Republican
Sheriff	Eric Knox	Republican
Surveyor	Jesse Wininger	Republican
Treasurer	Rick Renno	Republican

=== State ===
Past Gubernatorial Elections Results
Year	Republican	Democratic	Third Parties
2024	76.64% 8,151	20.96% 2,229	2.40% 156
2020	76.84% 8,017	20.89% 2,179	2.27% 237
2016	63.41% 6,047	33.55% 3,199	3.04% 290
2012	50.94% 4,641	46.25% 4,213	2.81% 256
2008	41.57% 3,967	56.09% 5,353	2.34% 223
2004	56.67% 5,088	41.95% 3,767	1.39% 124
2000	52.76% 3,944	45.58% 3,407	1.66% 124
1996	44.36% 2,979	52.42% 3,520	3.22% 216

Benton County is split between two of Missouri's legislative districts that elect members of the Missouri House of Representatives. Both are represented by Republicans.

- District 57 — Rodger Reedy (R-Windsor). Consists of the northern half of the county, including Cole Camp, Ionia, and Lincoln.

Missouri House of Representatives — District 57 — Benton County (2020)
Party	Candidate	Votes	%	±%
Republican	Rodger Reedy	4,127	100.00%	+17.13

Missouri House of Representatives — District 57 — Benton County (2018)
Party	Candidate	Votes	%	±%
Republican	Rodger Reedy	2,966	82.87%	+9.55
Democratic	Joan Shores	613	17.13%	−9.55

- District 125 — Jim Kalberloh (R-Lowry City). Consists of the southern half of the county, including Edwards and Warsaw.

Missouri House of Representatives — District 125 — Benton County (2020)
Party	Candidate	Votes	%	±%
Republican	Jim Kalberloh	5,010	100.00%	+38.24

Missouri House of Representatives — District 125 — Benton County (2018)
Party	Candidate	Votes	%	±%
Republican	Warren D. Love	2,910	61.76%	−38.24
Democratic	Chase Crawford	1,802	38.24%	+38.24

All of Benton County is a part of Missouri's 28th District in the Missouri Senate, which is represented by Sandy Crawford (R-Buffalo). A previous incumbent, Mike Parson, was elected Lieutenant Governor in 2016 and became Governor in 2018 following the resignation of Eric Greitens.

Missouri Senate — District 28 — Benton County (2018)
Party	Candidate	Votes	%	±%
Republican	Sandy Crawford	6,198	75.36%	+13.60
Democratic	Joe Poor	2,027	24.64%	−13.60

Missouri Senate — District 28 Special Election — Benton County (2017)
Party	Candidate	Votes	%	±%
Republican	Sandy Crawford	877	61.76%	−38.24
Democratic	Albert J. Skalicky	543	38.24%	+38.24

=== Federal ===
All of Benton County is included in Missouri's 4th Congressional District and is currently represented by Vicky Hartzler (R-Harrisonville) in the U.S. House of Representatives. Hartzler was elected to a sixth term in 2020 over Democratic challenger Lindsey Simmons.

U.S. House of Representatives — Missouri’s 4th Congressional District — Benton County (2020)
Party	Candidate	Votes	%	±%
Republican	Vicky Hartzler	7,981	77.28%	+5.54
Democratic	Lindsey Simmons	2,073	20.07%	−5.72
Libertarian	Steven K. Koonse	273	2.64%	+0.17

U.S. House of Representatives — Missouri's 4th Congressional District — Benton County (2018)
Party	Candidate	Votes	%	±%
Republican	Vicky Hartzler	5,966	71.74%	−1.99
Democratic	Renee Hoagenson	2,145	25.79%	+3.91
Libertarian	Mark Bliss	205	2.47%	−1.93

Benton County, along with the rest of the state of Missouri, is represented in the U.S. Senate by Josh Hawley (R-Columbia) and Roy Blunt (R-Strafford).

U.S. Senate – Class I – Benton County (2018)
Party	Candidate	Votes	%	±%
Republican	Josh Hawley	5,685	68.05%	+20.84
Democratic	Claire McCaskill	2,318	27.75%	−17.32
Independent	Craig O'Dear	166	1.99%	
Libertarian	Japheth Campbell	127	1.52%	−6.20
Green	Jo Crain	58	0.69%	+0.69

Blunt was elected to a second term in 2016 over then-Missouri Secretary of State Jason Kander.

U.S. Senate — Missouri — Benton County (2016)
Party	Candidate	Votes	%	±%
Republican	Roy Blunt	5,891	61.87%	+14.66
Democratic	Jason Kander	3,097	32.52%	−12.55
Libertarian	Jonathan Dine	300	3.15%	−4.57
Green	Johnathan McFarland	103	1.08%	+1.08
Constitution	Fred Ryman	131	1.38%	+1.38

==== Political culture ====
United States presidential election results for Benton County, Missouri
Year	Republican		Democratic		Third party(ies)	
Year	No.	%	No.	%	No.	%
1888	1,704	54.27%	1,374	43.76%	62	1.97%
1892	1,570	51.01%	1,058	34.37%	450	14.62%
1896	1,957	51.75%	1,762	46.59%	63	1.67%
1900	1,980	54.40%	1,532	42.09%	128	3.52%
1904	1,963	57.00%	1,372	39.84%	109	3.16%
1908	1,924	59.09%	1,280	39.31%	52	1.60%
1912	1,142	37.38%	1,209	39.57%	704	23.04%
1916	1,842	57.87%	1,285	40.37%	56	1.76%
1920	3,367	68.50%	1,506	30.64%	42	0.85%
1924	2,693	60.71%	1,588	35.80%	155	3.49%
1928	3,411	72.33%	1,296	27.48%	9	0.19%
1932	2,038	43.62%	2,596	55.57%	38	0.81%
1936	3,375	63.13%	1,950	36.48%	21	0.39%
1940	3,912	68.69%	1,765	30.99%	18	0.32%
1944	3,294	74.73%	1,108	25.14%	6	0.14%
1948	2,768	67.01%	1,360	32.92%	3	0.07%
1952	3,470	72.31%	1,303	27.15%	26	0.54%
1956	3,145	66.80%	1,563	33.20%	0	0.00%
1960	3,484	69.96%	1,496	30.04%	0	0.00%
1964	2,477	54.96%	2,030	45.04%	0	0.00%
1968	2,899	61.13%	1,345	28.36%	498	10.50%
1972	3,537	71.31%	1,423	28.69%	0	0.00%
1976	2,875	51.46%	2,684	48.04%	28	0.50%
1980	3,451	58.97%	2,241	38.29%	160	2.73%
1984	3,805	62.83%	2,251	37.17%	0	0.00%
1988	3,467	56.42%	2,654	43.19%	24	0.39%
1992	2,511	34.51%	3,195	43.91%	1,570	21.58%
1996	2,895	43.11%	2,996	44.62%	824	12.27%
2000	4,218	55.99%	3,150	41.81%	166	2.20%
2004	5,575	61.88%	3,381	37.53%	53	0.59%
2008	5,759	59.92%	3,629	37.76%	223	2.32%
2012	6,069	66.28%	2,925	31.94%	163	1.78%
2016	7,213	75.21%	2,025	21.12%	352	3.67%
2020	8,109	77.41%	2,180	20.81%	187	1.79%
2024	8,526	79.17%	2,166	20.11%	77	0.72%

At the presidential level, Benton County is solidly Republican. Benton County strongly favored Donald Trump in both 2016 and 2020. Bill Clinton was the last Democratic presidential nominee to carry Benton County in 1996 with a plurality of the vote, and a Democrat hasn't won majority support from the county's voters in a presidential election since Franklin Roosevelt in 1932.

Like most rural areas throughout Missouri, voters in Benton County generally adhere to socially and culturally conservative principles which tend to influence their Republican leanings. Despite Benton County's longstanding tradition of supporting socially conservative platforms, voters in the county have a penchant for advancing populist causes. In 2018, Missourians voted on a proposition (Proposition A) concerning right to work, the outcome of which ultimately reversed the right to work legislation passed in the state the previous year. 64.74% of Benton County voters cast their ballots to overturn the law.

=== Missouri presidential preference primaries ===
==== 2020 ====
The 2020 presidential primaries for both the Democratic and Republican parties were held in Missouri on March 10. On the Democratic side, former Vice President Joe Biden (D-Delaware) both won statewide and carried Benton County by a wide margin. Biden went on to defeat President Donald Trump in the general election.

Missouri Democratic Presidential Primary – Benton County (2020)
Party	Candidate	Votes	%	±%
Democratic	Joe Biden	843	69.50	
Democratic	Bernie Sanders	280	23.08	
Democratic	Tulsi Gabbard	10	0.82	
Democratic	Others/Uncommitted	80	6.60	

Incumbent President Donald Trump (R-Florida) faced a primary challenge from former Massachusetts Governor Bill Weld, but won both Benton County and statewide by overwhelming margins.

Missouri Republican Presidential Primary – Benton County (2020)
Party	Candidate	Votes	%	±%
Republican	Donald Trump	1,520	98.45	
Republican	Bill Weld	3	0.19	
Republican	Others/Uncommitted	21	1.36	

==== 2016 ====
The 2016 presidential primaries for both the Republican and Democratic parties were held in Missouri on March 15. Businessman Donald Trump (R-New York) narrowly won the state overall but carried a majority of the vote in Benton County. He went on to win the presidency.

Missouri Republican Presidential Primary – Benton County (2016)
Party	Candidate	Votes	%	±%
Republican	Donald Trump	2,278	55.40	
Republican	Ted Cruz	1,314	31.96	
Republican	John Kasich	287	6.98	
Republican	Marco Rubio	138	3.36	
Republican	Others/Uncommitted	95	2.31	

On the Democratic side, former Secretary of State Hillary Clinton (D-New York) narrowly won statewide and carried a majority in Benton County.

Missouri Democratic Presidential Primary – Benton County (2016)
Party	Candidate	Votes	%	±%
Democratic	Hillary Clinton	669	53.31	
Democratic	Bernie Sanders	568	45.26	
Democratic	Others/Uncommitted	18	1.43	

==== 2012 ====
The 2012 Missouri Republican Presidential Primary's results were nonbinding on the state's national convention delegates. Voters in Benton County supported former U.S. Senator Rick Santorum (R-Pennsylvania), who finished first in the state at large, but eventually lost the nomination to former Governor Mitt Romney (R-Massachusetts). Delegates to the congressional district and state conventions were chosen at a county caucus, which selected a delegation favoring Santorum. Incumbent President Barack Obama easily won the Missouri Democratic Primary and renomination. He defeated Romney in the general election.

==== 2008 ====
In 2008, the Missouri Republican Presidential Primary was closely contested, with Senator John McCain (R-Arizona) prevailing and eventually winning the nomination. However, former Governor Mike Huckabee (R-Arkansas) won a slim plurality in Benton County.

Missouri Republican Presidential Primary – Benton County (2008)
Party	Candidate	Votes	%	±%
Republican	Mike Huckabee	824	35.58	
Republican	John McCain	803	34.67	
Republican	Mitt Romney	580	25.04	
Republican	Ron Paul	75	3.24	
Republican	Others/Uncommitted	34	1.46	

Then-Senator Hillary Clinton (D-New York) received more votes than any candidate from either party in Benton County during the 2008 presidential primary. Despite initial reports that Clinton had won Missouri, Barack Obama (D-Illinois), also a Senator at the time, narrowly defeated her statewide and later became that year's Democratic nominee, going on to win the presidency.

Missouri Democratic Presidential Primary – Benton County (2008)
Party	Candidate	Votes	%	±%
Democratic	Hillary Clinton	1,753	68.77	
Democratic	Barack Obama	687	26.95	
Democratic	Others/Uncommitted	109	4.28	

== Communities ==
=== Cities ===
- Cole Camp
- Lincoln
- Warsaw (county seat)

=== Village ===
- Ionia

=== Census-designated places ===
- Bent Tree Harbor
- White Branch

=== Townships ===
- Alexander
- Cole
- Fristoe
- North Lindsey
- South Lindsey
- Tom
- Union
- White
- Williams

=== Other communities ===
- Avery
- Bentonville
- Brandon
- Cold Springs
- Crest
- Crockerville
- Dell
- Dell Junction
- Edmonson
- Edwards
- Fristoe
- Hastain
- Knobby
- Lake Creek
- Lakeview Heights
- Lively
- Majorville
- Mora
- Mount Hulda
- Palo Pinto
- Racket
- Santiago
- Tackner
- Valley View
- Whitakerville
- Wisdom
- Zora

== Notable people ==
Martin Heinrich - U.S. Senator (D-New Mexico) (2013–present), U.S. Representative (D-New Mexico) (2009-2013)

Stan Kroenke- owner of Los Angeles Rams, Denver Nuggets, Colorado Avalanche, and majority owner of Arsenal

Carol Junge Loomis -Journalist and retired senior editor-at-large at Fortune. She retired from Time/Fortune magazine in July 2014 after a tenure of over 60 years with the company.

== See also ==
- National Register of Historic Places listings in Benton County, Missouri
