= Warsaw, Missouri =

City in Missouri, U.S.

- City
- City of Warsaw
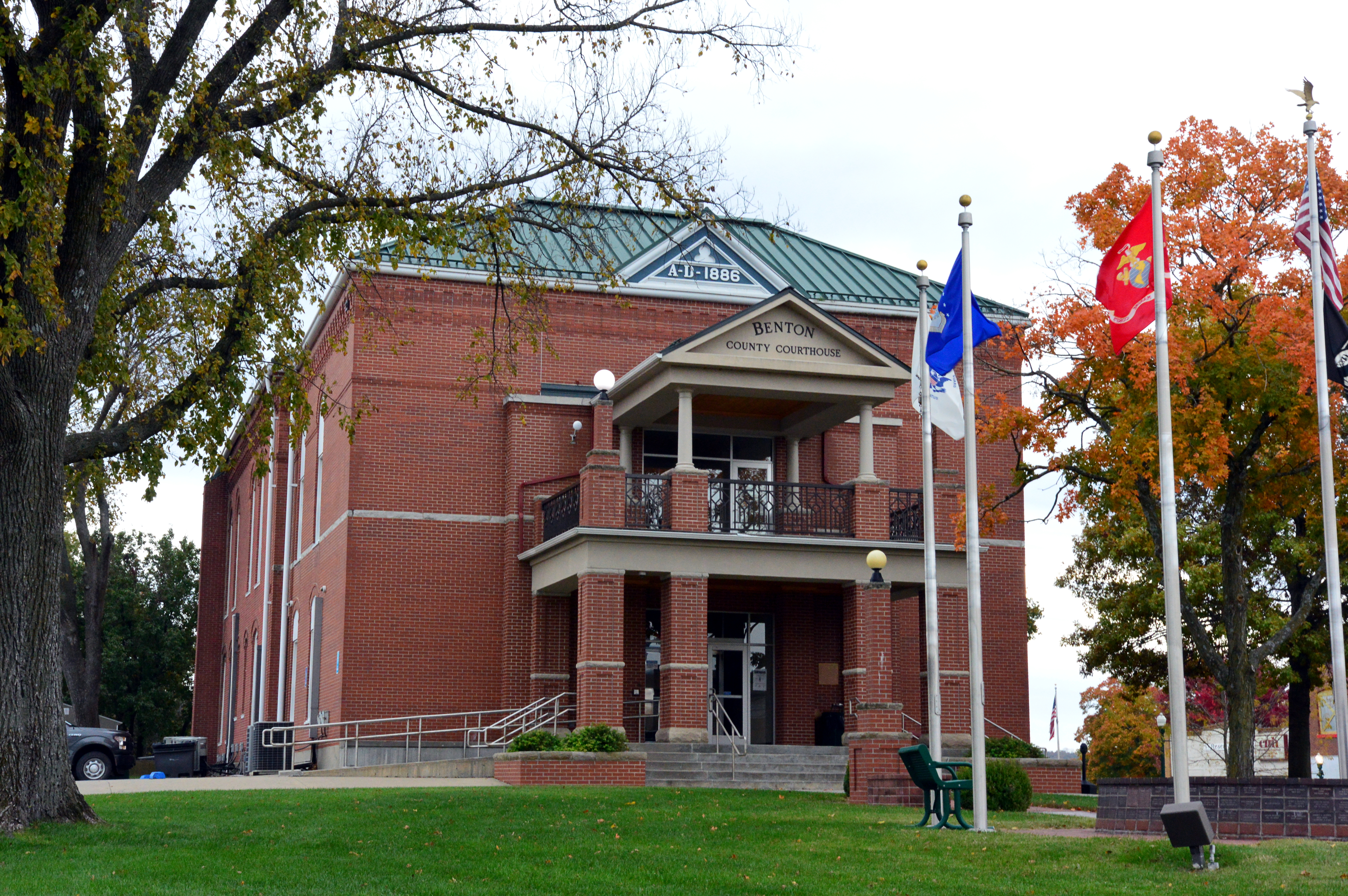
- Benton County Courthouse in Warsaw

- Logo

- Location of Warsaw, Missouri
- Coordinates: 38°14′43″N 93°22′38″W
- Country: United States
- State: Missouri
- County: Benton
- Founded: 1837
- Incorporated: 1843

Area
  - Total: 2.75 sq mi (7.11 km^{2})
  - Land: 2.49 sq mi (6.46 km^{2})
  - Water: 0.25 sq mi (0.65 km^{2})
- Elevation: 745 ft (227 m)

Population (2020)
  - Total: 2,209
  - Estimate (2023): 2,334
  - Density: 886.2/sq mi (342.18/km^{2})
- Time zone: UTC-6 (Central (CST))
  - Summer (DST): UTC-5 (CDT)
- ZIP code: 65355
- Area code: 660
- FIPS code: 29-77146
- GNIS feature ID: 2397201
- Website: www.welcometowarsaw.com

Warsaw is a city in and the county seat of Benton County, Missouri, United States. The population was 2,209 at the 2020 census.

Adjacent to the Osage River it is heavily tied to two major lakes on the river. The uppermost reaches of Lake of the Ozarks is part of southwest city limits and the Truman Dam and Truman Reservoir are on its northwest side.

== History ==
The original inhabitants of the area were the Delaware, Shawnee, Sac, Kickapoo, and Osage tribes (namesake of the Osage River which passed by the city). French settlers visited the area as early as 1719.

Warsaw was platted in 1837. The city was incorporated in 1843 and designated as the county seat of Benton County. The city was named after Warsaw, the capital city of Poland, in honor of the Revolutionary War hero Tadeusz Kościuszko, who was Polish and had also fought for independence in his homeland. Warsaw was a steamboat port, the furthest point up the Osage River they could navigate.

Permanent immigrants to the area were Germans, Scotch-Irish, and English, as well as transplant farmers from Kentucky, Tennessee and the Carolinas, first arriving circa 1820.

In 1931 the upper reaches of Lake of the Ozarks reached the community on the Osage River. The dam for Truman Reservoir on the Osage River just northwest of the city limits officially opened 1979 after construction began in 1964. Place names for many lake related businesses including the Harry S. Truman Regional Visitor Center have the Warsaw mailing address even though they are outside the city limits. The Warsaw city limits do not include Truman Reservoir lakefront. City limits do include waterfront the upper reaches of the Osage Arm of the Lake of the Ozarks.

The Upper Bridge was listed on the National Register of Historic Places in 1999. The bridge is the first crossing of the Osage River below the Truman Dam is actually a crossing of Lake of the Ozarks.

== Geography ==
Warsaw is located at 38°14'43" North, 93°22'38" West (38.245195, -93.377227). According to the United States Census Bureau, the city has a total area of 2.62 square miles (6.79 km^{2}), of which 2.41 square miles (6.24 km^{2}) is land and 0.21 square miles (0.54 km^{2}) is water. The total area is 7.6% water given its southern border the upper reaches of Lake of the Ozarks. Warsaw is located on a junction of U.S. Route 65 and Missouri Route 7. It is located on the northern terminus of Missouri Route 83.

== Climate ==
The record high in Warsaw, Missouri is 118 °F (47.8 °C), set on July 14, 1954, and a record low was set on February 13, 1905 at −40 °F (−40 °C). These two temperatures are also the record high and low for the state of Missouri. The average annual temperature is 56.7 °F (13.7 °C).

Climate data for Warsaw, Missouri, 1991–2020 normals, extremes 1980–present (Note: WARSAW 1, MO 1893–1984, TRUMAN DAM 1980–PRESENT)
Month	Jan	Feb	Mar	Apr	May	Jun	Jul	Aug	Sep	Oct	Nov	Dec	Year
Record high °F (°C)	80 (27)	86 (30)	96 (36)	94 (34)	104 (40)	111 (44)	118 (48)	113 (45)	108 (42)	98 (37)	89 (32)	82 (28)	118 (48)
Mean maximum °F (°C)	64.5 (18.1)	70.3 (21.3)	78.8 (26.0)	84.2 (29.0)	88.6 (31.4)	93.3 (34.1)	98.0 (36.7)	98.7 (37.1)	93.4 (34.1)	85.7 (29.8)	74.9 (23.8)	66.5 (19.2)	99.8 (37.7)
Mean daily maximum °F (°C)	42.5 (5.8)	46.8 (8.2)	57.0 (13.9)	67.7 (19.8)	76.1 (24.5)	84.9 (29.4)	89.7 (32.1)	88.8 (31.6)	81.6 (27.6)	69.9 (21.1)	57.3 (14.1)	46.4 (8.0)	67.4 (19.7)
Daily mean °F (°C)	32.2 (0.1)	36.0 (2.2)	45.4 (7.4)	55.7 (13.2)	65.6 (18.7)	74.9 (23.8)	79.6 (26.4)	78.0 (25.6)	70.1 (21.2)	58.1 (14.5)	46.5 (8.1)	36.5 (2.5)	56.6 (13.7)
Mean daily minimum °F (°C)	21.9 (−5.6)	25.1 (−3.8)	33.9 (1.1)	43.7 (6.5)	55.1 (12.8)	64.9 (18.3)	69.4 (20.8)	67.3 (19.6)	58.5 (14.7)	46.3 (7.9)	35.6 (2.0)	26.7 (−2.9)	45.7 (7.6)
Mean minimum °F (°C)	4.5 (−15.3)	9.6 (−12.4)	17.6 (−8.0)	29.7 (−1.3)	40.9 (4.9)	52.9 (11.6)	59.9 (15.5)	57.3 (14.1)	44.5 (6.9)	31.3 (−0.4)	20.9 (−6.2)	10.8 (−11.8)	1.3 (−17.1)
Record low °F (°C)	−29 (−34)	−40 (−40)	−12 (−24)	10 (−12)	27 (−3)	37 (3)	44 (7)	40 (4)	23 (−5)	11 (−12)	−1 (−18)	−20 (−29)	−40 (−40)
Average precipitation inches (mm)	1.75 (44)	2.14 (54)	3.04 (77)	4.60 (117)	5.52 (140)	5.24 (133)	4.70 (119)	3.96 (101)	4.11 (104)	3.45 (88)	3.06 (78)	1.97 (50)	43.54 (1,106)
Average precipitation days (≥ 0.01 in)	6.6	5.9	9.7	11.6	12.2	9.6	8.2	8.0	8.0	9.3	7.4	5.7	102.2
Source 1: NOAA
Source 2: National Weather Service

== Demographics ==
Historical population
Census	Pop.	Note	%±
1880	515		—
1890	700		35.9%
1900	743		6.1%
1910	824		10.9%
1920	925		12.3%
1930	1,102		19.1%
1940	957		−13.2%
1950	936		−2.2%
1960	1,054		12.6%
1970	1,423		35.0%
1980	1,494		5.0%
1990	1,696		13.5%
2000	2,070		22.1%
2010	2,127		2.8%
2020	2,209		3.9%
U.S. Decennial Census

=== 2020 census ===
As of the 2020 census, Warsaw had a population of 2,209. The median age was 45.8 years. 20.8% of residents were under the age of 18 and 28.7% of residents were 65 years of age or older. For every 100 females there were 88.5 males, and for every 100 females age 18 and over there were 87.6 males age 18 and over.

0.0% of residents lived in urban areas, while 100.0% lived in rural areas.

There were 974 households in Warsaw, of which 26.0% had children under the age of 18 living in them. Of all households, 35.4% were married-couple households, 20.7% were households with a male householder and no spouse or partner present, and 35.8% were households with a female householder and no spouse or partner present. About 39.8% of all households were made up of individuals and 22.1% had someone living alone who was 65 years of age or older.

There were 1,082 housing units, of which 10.0% were vacant. The homeowner vacancy rate was 2.3% and the rental vacancy rate was 5.9%.

Racial composition as of the 2020 census
Race	Number	Percent
White	2,000	90.5%
Black or African American	17	0.8%
American Indian and Alaska Native	8	0.4%
Asian	15	0.7%
Native Hawaiian and Other Pacific Islander	0	0.0%
Some other race	30	1.4%
Two or more races	139	6.3%
Hispanic or Latino (of any race)	76	3.4%

=== 2010 census ===
As of the census of 2010, there were 2,127 people, 914 households, and 523 families living in the city. The population density was 882.6 inhabitants per square mile (340.8/km^{2}). There were 1,085 housing units at an average density of 450.2 per square mile (173.8/km^{2}). The racial makeup of the city was 96.3% White, 1.0% African American, 1.1% Native American, 0.2% Asian, 0.4% from other races, and 0.9% from two or more races. Hispanic or Latino of any race were 3.2% of the population.

There were 914 households, of which 27.4% had children under the age of 18 living with them, 41.6% were married couples living together, 12.1% had a female householder with no husband present, 3.5% had a male householder with no wife present, and 42.8% were non-families. 37.7% of all households were made up of individuals, and 21% had someone living alone who was 65 years of age or older. The average household size was 2.20 and the average family size was 2.88.

The median age in the city was 45 years. 22.7% of residents were under the age of 18; 6% were between the ages of 18 and 24; 21.2% were from 25 to 44; 25.1% were from 45 to 64; and 25% were 65 years of age or older. The gender makeup of the city was 46.7% male and 53.3% female.

=== 2000 census ===
As of the census of 2000, there were 2,070 people, 923 households, and 539 families living in the city. The population density was 1,045.5 inhabitants per square mile (403.7/km^{2}). There were 1,027 housing units at an average density of 518.7 per square mile (200.3/km^{2}). The racial makeup of the city was 98.36% White, 0.14% African American, 0.43% Native American, 0.05% Asian, 0.05% Pacific Islander, 0.10% from other races, and 0.87% from two or more races. 1.26% of the population were Hispanic or Latino of any race.

There were 923 households, out of which 24.2% had children under the age of 18 living with them, 44.7% were married couples living together, 10.7% had a female householder with no husband present, and 41.6% were non-families. 38.6% of all households were made up of individuals, and 21.5% had someone living alone who was 65 years of age or older. The average household size was 2.12, and the average family size was 2.78.

In the city, the population was spread out, with 21.7% under the age of 18, 7.1% from 18 to 24, 22.9% from 25 to 44, 21.2% from 45 to 64, and 27.1% who were 65 years of age or older. The median age was 44 years. For every 100 females, there were 79.7 males. For every 100 females age 18 and over, there were 77.7 males.

The median income for a household in the city was $23,583, and the median income for a family was $33,068. Males had a median income of $24,464 versus $19,301 for females. The per capita income for the city was $15,262. 18.5% of the population and 9.5% of families were below the poverty line. 24.7% of those under the age of 18 and 14.2% of those 65 and older were living below the poverty line.

== Education ==
Warsaw R-IX School District operates four schools at Warsaw: North Elementary School, South Elementary School, John Boise Middle School, and Warsaw High School.

Warsaw also has a private school, Cornerstone Academy of the Ozarks (K-12).

Warsaw has a public library, a branch of the Boonslick Regional Library.

== See also ==
- List of cities in Missouri
