= Area code 660 =

Telephone area code for northern and western Missouri, United States

Coordinates: 39°N 93°W

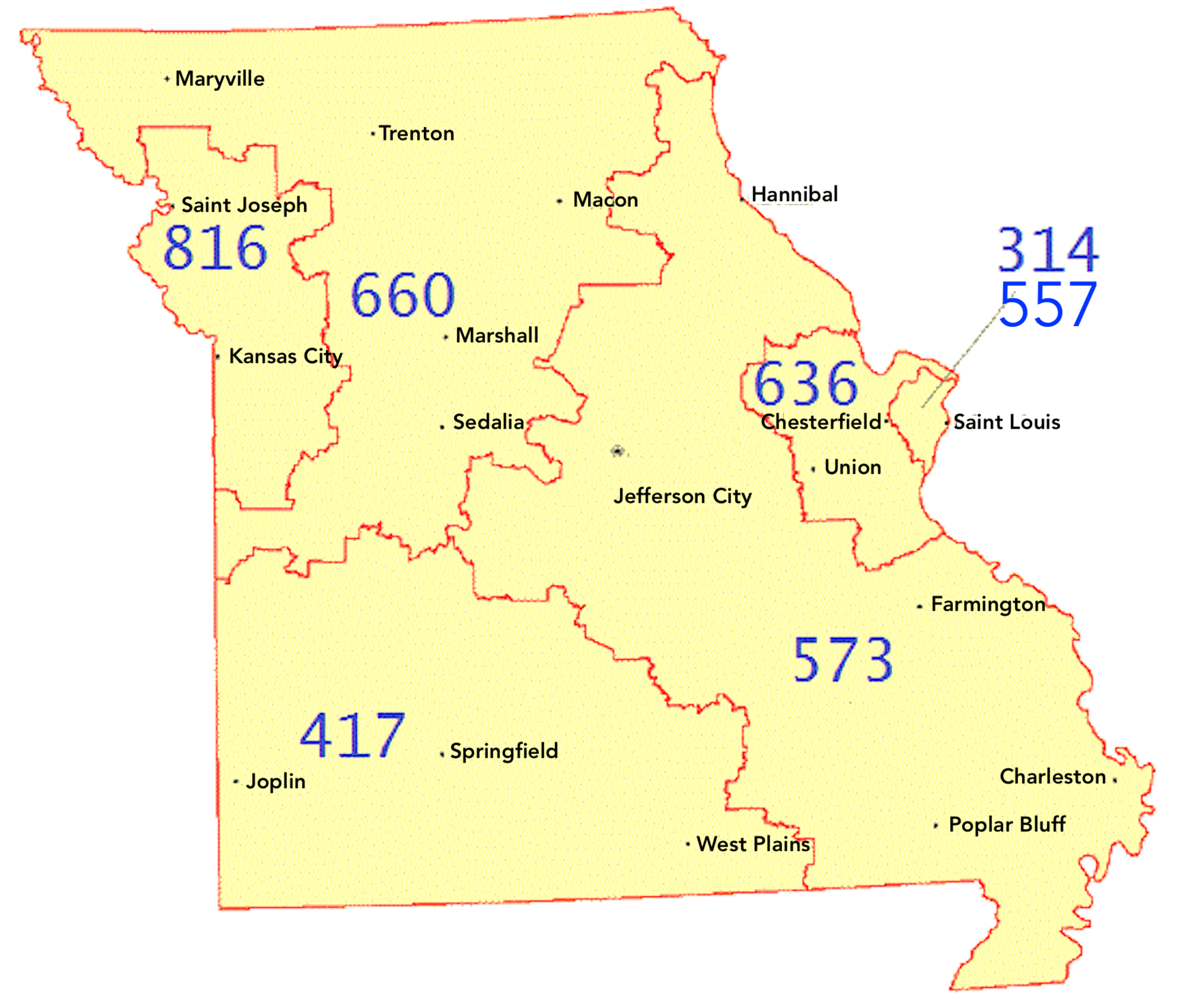
Area codes of Missouri

Area code 660 is the telephone area code in the North American Numbering Plan (NANP) for the northern and western part of the U.S. state of Missouri. It surrounds the numbering plan area 816, from which it was split on October 12, 1997.

== History ==
When the American Telephone and Telegraph Company (AT&T) created a universal North American telephone numbering plan for Operator Toll Dialing in 1947, Missouri was divided into two numbering plan areas. Area code 816 served points generally north and west of Columbia and Jefferson City, while area code 314 served the eastern third of the state, including St. Louis. In 1951, a third NPA with area code 417 was created for southwestern Missouri. This reduced 816 to the northern third of Missouri, including the Kansas City metropolitan area.

By late 1996, the proliferation of cell phones and market reforms related to deregulation by the Telecommunications Act of 1996 required an additional area code for northern Missouri. On April 10, 1997, Southwestern Bell declared a Jeopardy Situation with the Missouri Public Service Commission (MPSC), which oversees telecommunications in the state, and the North American Numbering Plan Administration (NANPA). On July 28, 1997, the NANPA (Bellcore) announced an area code split, in which the Kansas City metropolitan area and the St. Joseph area would retain area code 816, while the remainder of the NPA would receive the new area code 660. Area code 660 comprised the rural eastern and northwestern portions of the then-current 816 area to minimize disruption to subscribers in the more densely populated urban areas. The rate centers of Lexington (259) and Warrensburg (429) moved to 660, despite being generally considered a part of the Kansas City area.

On June 4, 1997, the MPSC announced the split for October 12, 1997, when a permissive dialing period would commenced, until April 19, 1998, during which long-distance calls to the 660 territory could be completed using either 816 or 660.

Prior to October 2021, area code 660 had telephone numbers assigned for the central office code 988. In 2020, 988 was designated nationwide as a dialing code for the National Suicide Prevention Lifeline, which created a conflict for exchanges that permit seven-digit dialing. This area code was therefore scheduled to transition to ten-digit dialing by October 24, 2021.

Area code 660 is one of the most thinly populated area codes in the nation, and is therefore nowhere near exhaustion. As of September 2022, the projected exhaust date for 660 is the third quarter of 2043, which has been extended from a previous estimate of 2040.

== Service area ==
=== Major cities ===
- Chillicothe
- Kirksville
- Marshall
- Maryville
- Moberly
- Sedalia
- Warrensburg

=== Other towns ===
- Albany
- Appleton City
- Atlanta
- Bethany
- Blairstown
- Blackburn
- Blackwater
- Boonville
- Brashear
- Braymer
- Brimson
- Brookfield
- Browning
- Butler
- Callao
- Calhoun
- Carrollton
- Centerview
- Chilhowee
- Conception Junction
- Clearmont
- Clinton
- Cole Camp
- Dawn
- Downing
- Eagleville
- Fayette
- Gallatin
- Gilliam
- Gorin
- Green Ridge
- Hale
- Higginsville
- King City
- Knob Noster
- Laclede
- Lancaster
- La Belle
- La Monte
- Leeton
- Lexington
- Ludlow
- Macon
- Malta Bend
- Madison
- Marceline
- Mendon
- Montrose
- Norborne
- Otterville
- Paris
- Polo
- Princeton
- Purdin
- Rayville
- Rockville
- Rock Port
- Salisbury
- Slater
- Smithton
- South Lineville
- Stanberry
- Sweet Springs
- Syracuse
- Trenton
- Unionville
- Urich
- Warsaw
- Waverly
- Wayland
- Windsor
- Wyaconda

Missouri area codes: 314/557, 417, 573/235, 636, 660, 816/975
	North: 319, 641, 712	
West: 402/531, 816/975, 785, 913	area code 660	East: 573
	South: 417	
Iowa area codes: 319, 515, 563, 641, 712
Kansas area codes: 316, 620, 785, 913
Nebraska area codes: 308, 402/531
