= 2025 South Kansas tornado family =

Series of intense tornadoes in Kansas, USA

- A NEXRAD radar loop of the supercell responsible for the tornadoes.

Meteorological history
- Date: May 18–19, 2025
- Duration: 9:21 PM–12:20 AM CDT (UTC-05:00) (Note: The timestamps are based on the formation of the first tornado and the dissipation of the last tornado.)

Tornado family
- Tornadoes: 8 (Note: Five tornadoes were rated EF3 that struck from Comanche County to Reno Cpimtu, Kansas. Three satellite tornadoes were confirmed in Kiowa and Pratt counties.)
- Max. rating: EF3 tornado
- Duration: 2 hours, 59 minutes
- Highest winds: 160 mph (260 km/h) (Cullison–Iuka, Kansas EF3 tornado)

Overall effects
- Fatalities: 0
- Injuries: 0
- Areas affected: Comanche, Kiowa, Edwards, Pratt, Stafford and Reno Counties; specifically around Greensburg, Brenham, Haviland, Cullison, Iuka, Preston, Turon and Plevna, Kansas, United States
- Part of the Tornado outbreak of May 18–21, 2025 and tornado outbreaks of 2025

Throughout the night hours of May 18–19, 2025, a lone supercell thunderstorm produced a family of multiple large and intense tornadoes across the southern portions of the state of Kansas, in the Great Plains region of the United States. (Note: According to the NOAA's Monthly Climate Reports, all five EF3 tornadoes were from one lone supercell thunderstorm.) Five intense tornadoes, all rated EF3 on the Enhanced Fujita scale, were confirmed. Many rural farmsteads and communities across Kiowa, Edwards, Pratt, Stafford and Reno Counties were struck by these powerful tornadoes. The small city of Plevna took a direct hit from one of these tornadoes around midnight. Despite the large-scale tornadic activity, no casualties were reported with these tornadoes.

The tornadoes themselves were a part of a large tornado outbreak that lasted from May 18–21, which followed after another major and deadly outbreak on May 15–16 during the active 2025 season. In the wake of the tornadoes, storm chasers, meteorologists, local news, and residents of southern Kansas were astounded, with some having memories of what happened over 18 years earlier, when a massive and devastating EF5 tornado struck and damaged 95% of the city of Greensburg on May 4, 2007.

== Meteorological synopsis ==
=== Model synoptics ===
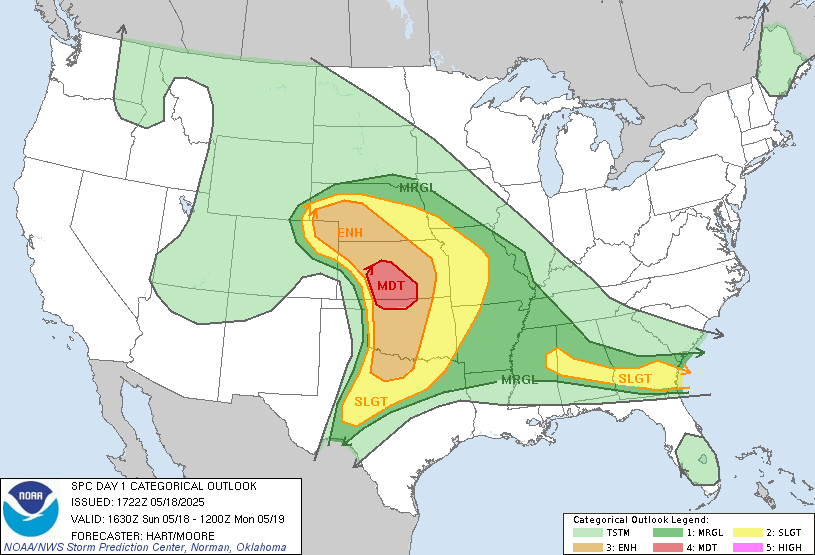
The Day 1 Convective Outlook from May 18, 2025. A moderate risk situates across northern Oklahoma and central Kansas.

A deep upper-level trough across the western U.S. set the stage for the beginning of the multi-day outbreak on May 18. Strong southwesterly mid-level flow overspread the central and southern Plains, with 500 mb winds of 60–70 knots (69–81 mph) moving over a destabilizing warm sector. At the surface, a sharpening dry line extended from southeastern Colorado into the eastern Texas Panhandle, while a retreating warm front was draped across northern Oklahoma and southern Kansas. This front separated very moist low-level air to the south from drier and cooler air to the north, and it helped focus the afternoon and evening severe threat. Surface dew points surged into the upper 60s and low 70s°F (18 to 23°C), and mixed-layer CAPE (MLCAPE) values reached 3000–4500 joules per kilogram in parts of western Oklahoma and south-central Kansas.

Forecast models and observed soundings indicated a strongly sheared environment, with enlarged hodographs near the warm front and low-level jet intensification expected during the evening. Effective bulk shear of 50–65 knots (58-75 mph) and SRH values over 300 m^{2}/s² in localized areas created a highly favorable setup for tornadic supercells. The greatest risk was forecast in a corridor from the eastern Texas Panhandle through western Oklahoma and into southern Kansas, especially near the triple point and warm front intersection. With steep mid-level lapse rates and strong instability in place, large to very large hail (potentially 2–4 inches in diameter) was also a significant concern with any sustained supercells. The Storm Prediction Center (SPC) issued a moderate risk for southern Kansas and northern Oklahoma, including a 15% hatched area (EF2+) for tornadoes and very large hail.

=== Prelude and forecasting of storms ===
By mid to late afternoon, isolated supercells were expected to initiate near the triple point in southwestern Kansas and farther south along the dryline in western Oklahoma. Storms were forecast to rapidly become severe, with early development possibly influenced by convective inhibition but then quickly intensifying with loss of the cap. Forecast guidance highlighted the potential for one or more discrete supercells to persist into the evening, producing significant hail and strong tornadoes, particularly in southern Kansas and northern Oklahoma. As the evening progressed, upscale growth into clusters was anticipated farther south into northwest Texas and southwestern Oklahoma, with increasing wind potential and some continuation of the tornado threat into nighttime.

== Tornado summaries ==
Confirmed tornadoes by Enhanced Fujita rating
EFU	EF0	EF1	EF2	EF3	EF4	EF5	Total
1	0	2	0	5	0	0	8

Kiowa County, Kansas
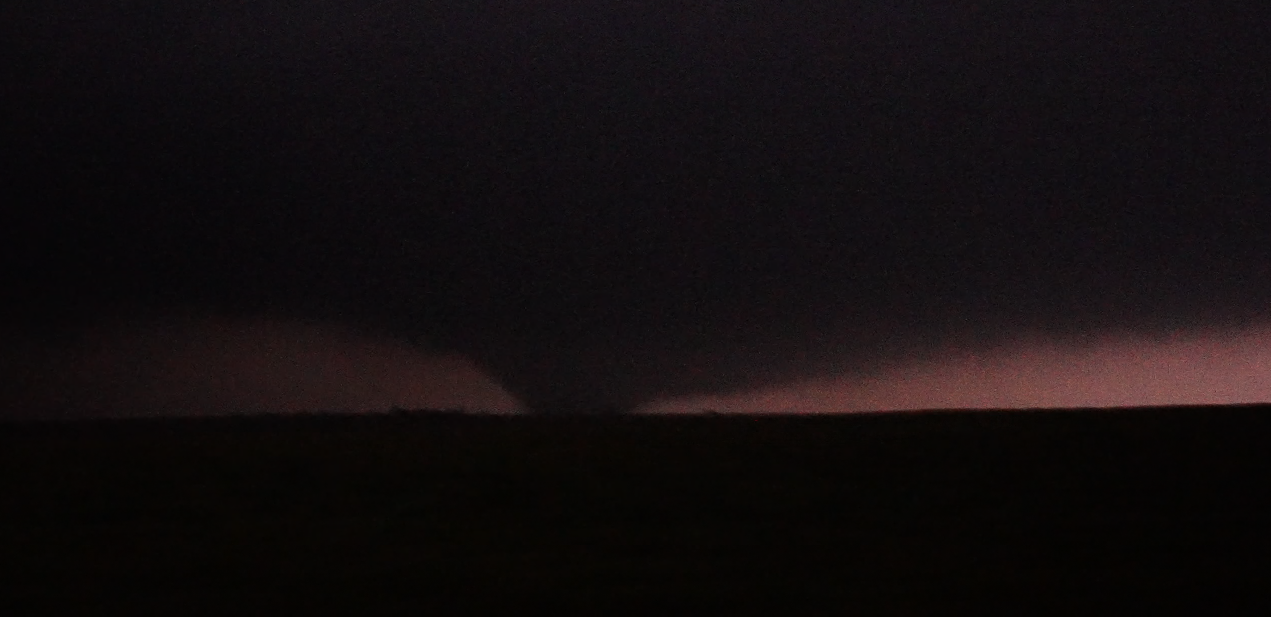
- The tornado seen illuminated across the fields northwest of Coldwater.

Meteorological history
- Formed: May 18, 2025, 9:21 PM CDT (UTC−05:00)
- Dissipated: May 18, 2025, 9:38 PM CDT (UTC−05:00)
- Duration: 17 minutes

EF3 tornado
- on the Enhanced Fujita scale
- Max width: 800 yards (0.45 mi; 0.73 km)
- Path length: 8.18 miles (13.16 km)
- Highest winds: 155 mph (290 km/h)

Overall effects
- Fatalities: 0
- Injuries: 0
- Damage: Unknown
- Areas affected: Southwestern Kiowa County

=== Kiowa County, Kansas ===
==== Initial intense tornado ====
The first major tornado of the night touched down in far north Comanche County, to the northwest of Coldwater right after dusk settled at 9:21 PM CDT (02:21 UTC). Upon formation along County Line Road, the tornado broke branches off trees at EF0 intensity before moving into neighboring Kiowa County. Upon entry, the storm began to widen far west of US Highway 183 as it began to track to the north through the open fields and paralleling 17th Avenue east.

==== Farmstead destruction ====
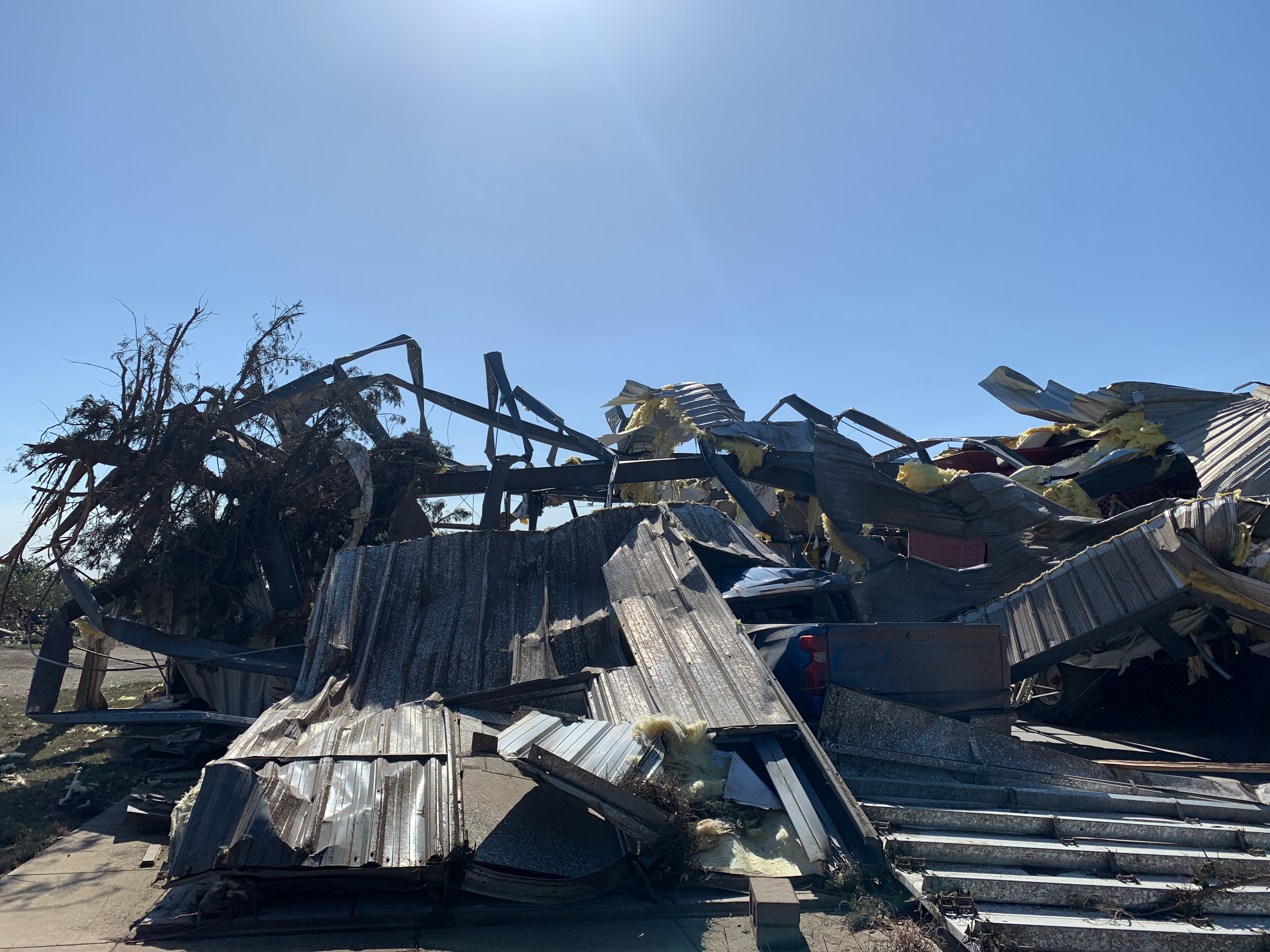
High-end EF3 damage to a metal farm building southeast of Mullinville.

As the tornado continued its journey in rural southwestern Kiowa County, heading northwards towards the intersection of 17th Avenue and V Street, it started closing in on a lone farmstead located at another three-way junction. Along the three-way junction between 17th Avenue and U Street, the tornado impacted this farmstead at peak strength, causing high-end EF3 damage to a metal farm building with winds of 155 mph (249 km/h). Nearby trees were subsequently uprooted and or debarked at EF3 intensity as well, and a grain cart was displaced 100 yd (91 m) away into a grove of trees with estimated EF2 winds of 120 mph (190 km/h). The residing farmhouse, which despite it was engulfed by the tornado, suffered from moderate EF1 damage.

==== Endpoint near Mullinville ====
After causing intense destruction the property, the tornado continued its trek to the north as it paralleled 17th Avenue, destroying powerlines at high-end EF1 intensity. Up ahead, high-end EF1 damage occurred again as trees had their trunks snapped with winds estimated at 105 mph (169 km/h). After that, the tornado headed northeasterly before dissipating at 9:38 PM CDT (02:38 UTC) to the southeast of Mullinville. This was the first EF3 tornado of the event, tracking for just over 8 mi (13 km) and was up to nearly half a mile wide. It lasted for just under 20 minutes and caused no injuries or fatalities.

Greensburg, Kansas
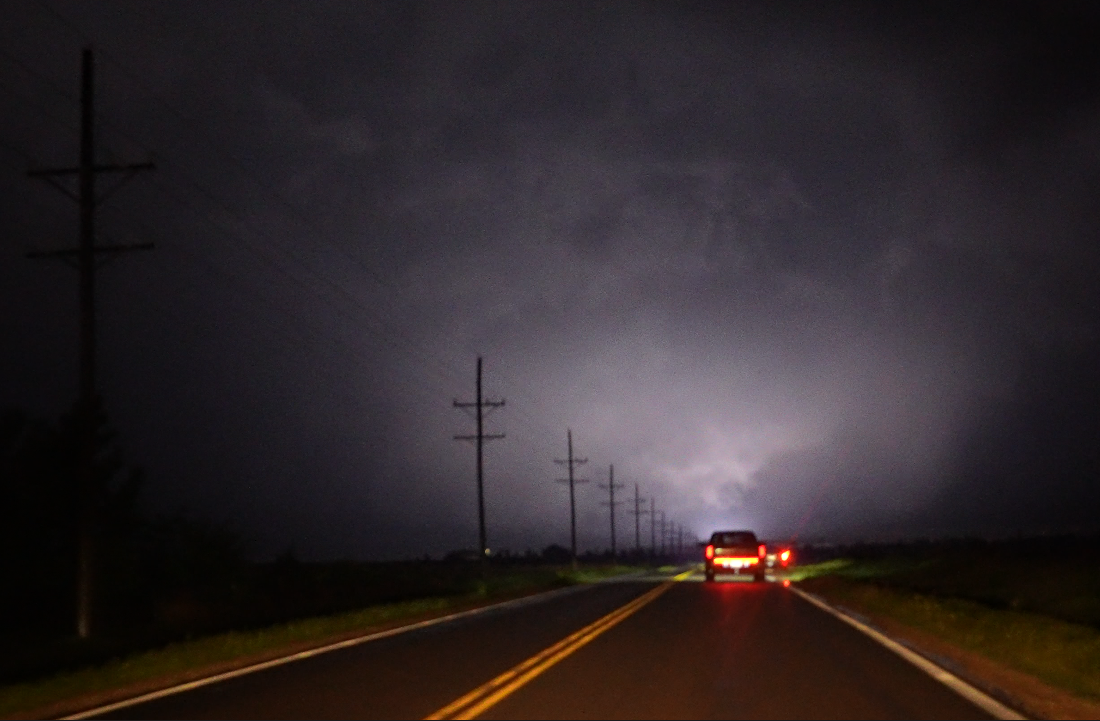
- Photo of the tornado crossing US 183 to the south of Greensburg, causing a power flash.

Meteorological history
- Formed: May 18, 2025, 9:44 PM CDT (UTC−05:00)
- Dissipated: May 18, 2025, 10:06 PM CDT (UTC−05:00)
- Duration: 22 minutes

EF3 tornado
- on the Enhanced Fujita scale
- Max width: 500 yards (0.28 mi; 0.46 km)
- Path length: 10.41 miles (16.75 km)
- Highest winds: 140 mph (290 km/h)

Satellite tornadoes
- Tornadoes: 1 confirmed (Note: This was a satellite vortex that was part of the main circulation, but it is still counted as a tornado.)
- Max. rating: EF1 tornado
- Highest winds: 110 mph (180 km/h)

Overall effects
- Fatalities: 0
- Injuries: 0
- Damage: Unknown
- Areas affected: Areas south and east of Greensburg and Brenham

=== Greensburg, Kansas ===
==== New cycle and tornado emergency ====
Six minutes after the first EF3 tornado dissipated, at 9:44 PM CDT (02:44 UTC), a second intense tornado touched down in a field, on the western flank of US 183. Upon crossing the highway, the tornado rapidly widened and intensified significantly, as it downed powerlines at EF2 intensity with winds of 120 mph (190 km/h). On the northern side of the tornado, a truck trailer was rolled over on its side at one property along US 183.

A tornado emergency was issued at 9:48 PM CDT (02:48 UTC) by the National Weather Service office in Dodge City, Kansas, as an apparent large and damaging tornado was located south of Greensburg. The large and significant tornado continued to the northeast, passing in between numerous farmsteads as it continued to grow in width. Another instance of EF2 damage occurred, as the tornado snapped yet more powerlines at the four-way crossroad between N Street and 31st Avenue. A small, satellite tornado formed on the northern flank of the tornado. The vortex caused EF1 damage to utility poles on 31st Avenue and flipped a small section of one nearby irrigation pivot that the parent tornado was damaging before merging with the main vortex shortly after. Over at M Street and 33rd Avenue, the main circulation yet again inflicted damage of EF2 intensity in this area, as two pole transmission towers were toppled with 130 mph (210 km/h) winds in a 0.5 mi (0.80 km) wide damage swath, and to their south a tree grove was destroyed. Not far to the northeast of the destroyed pole towers, another irrigation pivot was flipped at EF1 strength along the tornado's eastern flank.

==== Intensification and dissipation ====
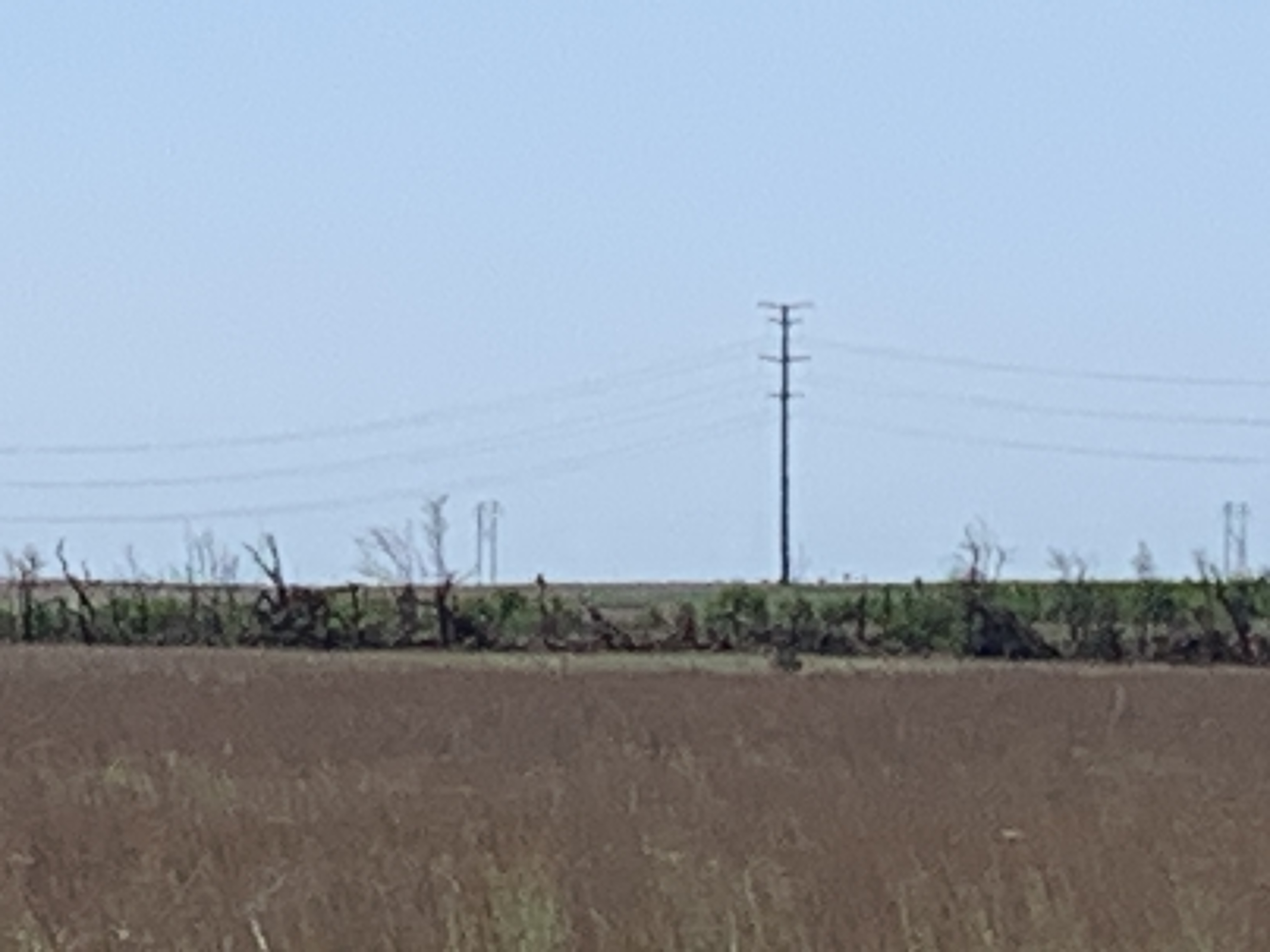
Low-end EF3 tree damage near Greensburg.

Encroaching on a property to its north, the tornado passed just east of a farmhouse before reaching peak intensity. Here, the tornado caused EF3 damage to a shelter belt, debarking many trees and leaving only the stubs and largest branches left standing. The storm continued and on L Street weakened in strength, as EF2-level damage was inflicted to a snapped pole. The tornado then changed its direction more east-northeasterly as it was passing southeast of Greensburg. At this point, it caused another trail of considerable damage from L Street east of 35th Avenue, with more electrical lines downed at high-end EF2 strength, and a pivot separated and displaced with estimated 120 mph (190 km/h) winds. West of 39th Avenue, another pivot was damaged while the tornado headed back on a northeasterly track again. The tornado then abruptly headed north as it was beginning to reach the end of its life. Passing east and north of Brenham, the tornado inflicted one final instance of EF1 damage to a pivot, before it dissipated just northeast of the small community at 10:06 PM CDT (03:06 UTC).

Haviland, Kansas
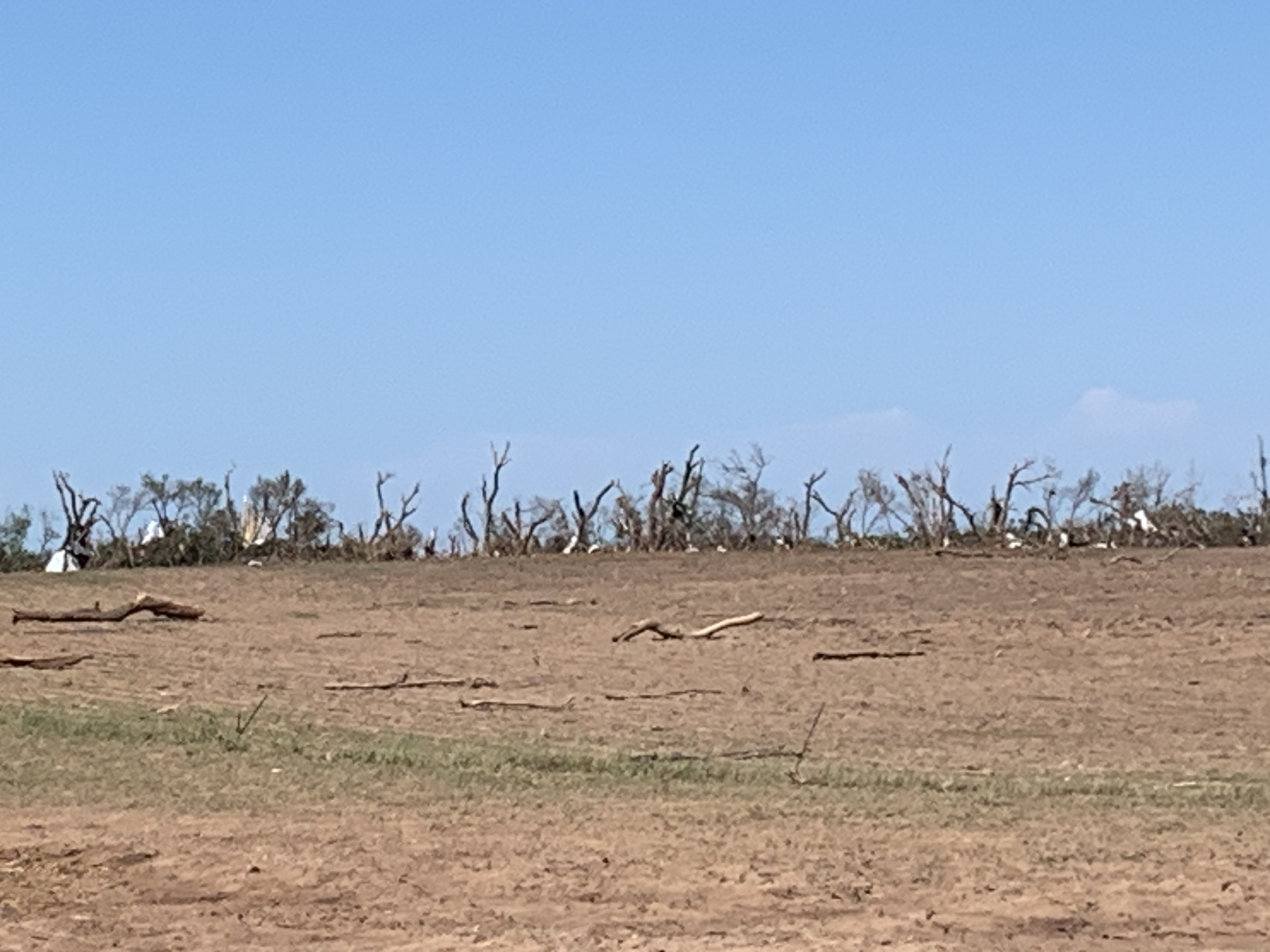
- Low-end EF3 tree damage inflicted in northeastern Kiowa County.

Meteorological history
- Formed: May 18, 2025, 10:04 PM CDT (UTC-05:00)
- Dissipated: May 18, 2025, 10:39 PM CDT (UTC-05:00)
- Duration: 35 minutes

EF3 tornado
- on the Enhanced Fujita scale
- Max width: 500 yards (0.28 mi; 0.46 km)
- Path length: 15.09 miles (24.29 km)
- Highest winds: 155 mph (249 km/h)

Satellite tornadoes
- Tornadoes: 1 confirmed
- Max. rating: EF1 tornado
- Highest winds: 90 mph (140 km/h)

Overall effects
- Fatalities: 0
- Injuries: 0
- Damage: Unknown
- Areas affected: Areas east of Brenham, to west and north of Haviland, and south of Trousdale

=== Haviland, Kansas ===
==== Formation of third severe tornado ====
Just two minutes before the previous intense tornado near Greensburg dissipated, the parent supercell cycled and dropped its third intense tornado at 10:04 PM CDT (03:04 UTC) southeast of Brenham. Heading northeast towards US Highway 54. Here, the tornado impacted a stalled Union Pacific freight train at an estimated EF2 strength, toppling some 100 rail cars.

After derailing the train, the tornado moved onward and made a harder turn to the east-northeast as it was west of Haviland. Along I Street, tree lines and powerlines along the road were debarked at high-end EF2 strength before the tornado banked back to its original trajectory of a northeastern direction. Passing through flat farmland, the tornado impacted and flipped irrigation pivots at significant strength, as EF2 damage was considered inflicted along H Street. A minute later, at approximately 10:14 PM CDT (03:14 UTC) an EF1 satellite tornado formed over to the west of the main circulation, to the north of Brenham. Along its track, this small and short-lived tornado flipped one pivot and snapped large branches off trees before dissipating seven minutes later at 10:27 PM CDT (03:27 UTC). No casualties were reported and winds were estimated at peak to be 90 mph (140 km/h).

==== Damage swath and strengthening ====
Along 47th Avenue, a 0.5 mile (0.8 km) wide path of downed powerlines was surveyed, as the tornado was at a persistent EF2 intensity. Over to the east, another pivot was struck and separated, with some parts tossed nearly 0.25 miles (0.40 km) from their original points. Approaching the four-way junction intersecting both G Street and 49th Avenue, the tornado encroached on two properties northwest of Haviland. The southern of the two was struck with considerable intensity, as both a large barn was completely destroyed and the residing home sustained from EF2 roof damage. Over to the northern property, buildings received only EF1-level damage. Moving almost precisely over the crossroads and on the eastern flank of 49th Avenue, the tornado restrengthened back to EF2 intensity as a tree grove was impacted, with the trunks of some snapped. Due north of Haviland at F Street, the tornado passed extremely closely to a relatively large farm, partially destroying a big grain bin system.

==== Peak intensity and subsequent occlusion ====
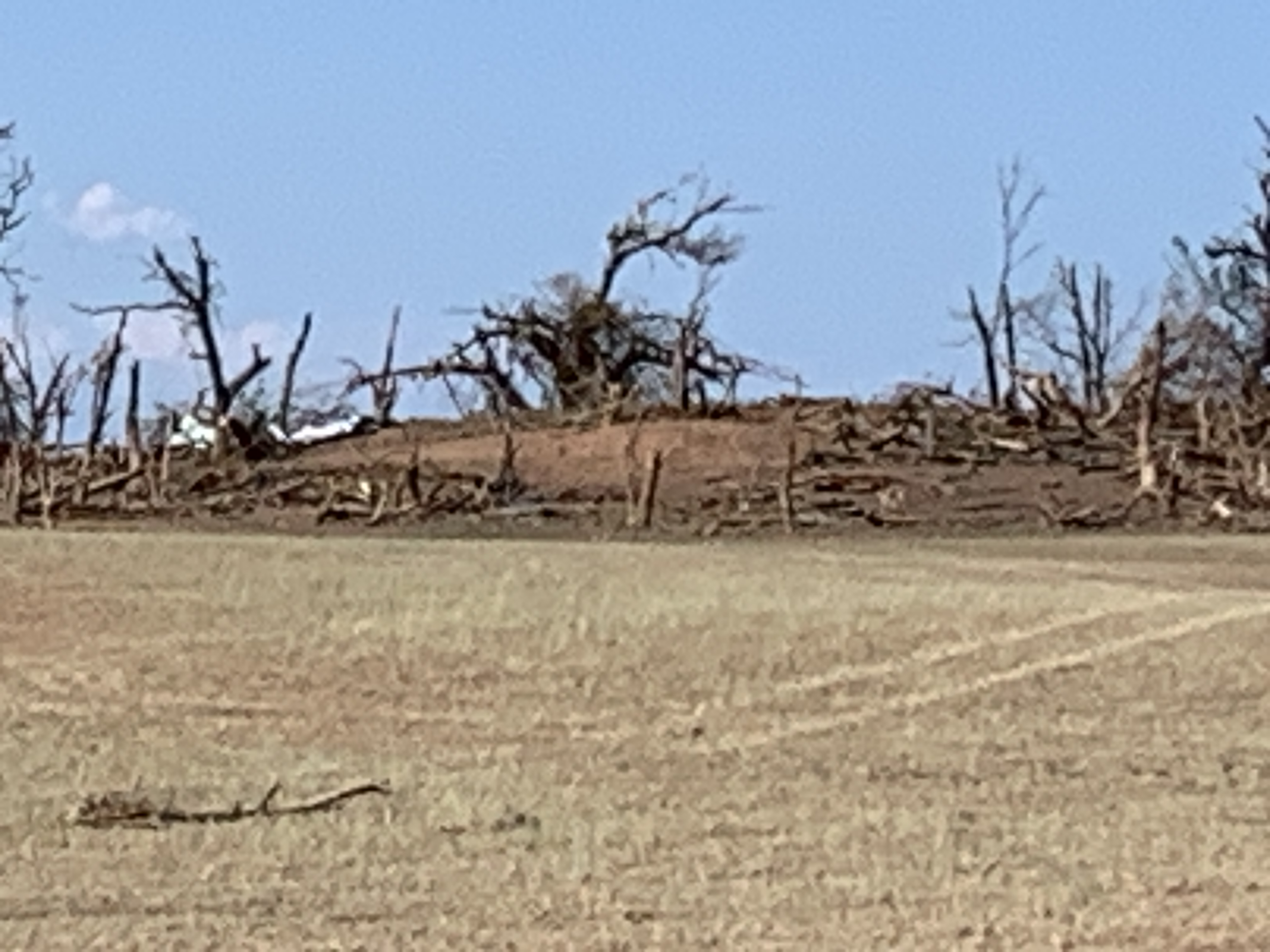
Annihilated tree grove at high-end EF3 intensity northwest of Wellsford.

From E Street to beyond, the tornado steadily increased in intensity, inflicting EF2 to EF3 damage. On 53rd Avenue, the center of the tornado narrowly missed a direct impact on one farmstead, however to the east the tornado completely shredded a shelter belt. Winds at this location were assessed to be low-end EF3 intensity, with corresponding winds of 145 mph (233 km/h). Crossing over D Street, the tornado yet again completely obliterated trees as it reached peak high-end EF3 winds. Passing 55th Avenue, the tornado caused its last instance of significant (EF2+) damage as it flipped and separated another irrigation pivot.

Afterwards, the tornado headed due north and into Edwards County in its occluding phase. It then moved northwest and dissipated at 10:39 PM CDT (03:39 UTC) to the southeast of Trousdale.

Iuka, Kansas
- The tornado seen near Iuka.

Meteorological history
- Formed: May 18, 2025, 10:47 PM CDT (UTC−05:00)
- Dissipated: May 18, 2025, 11:08 PM CDT (UTC−05:00)
- Duration: 21 minutes

EF3 tornado
- on the Enhanced Fujita scale
- Max width: 500 yards (0.28 mi; 0.46 km)
- Path length: 11.45 miles (18.43 km)
- Highest winds: 160 mph (290 km/h)

Satellite tornadoes
- Tornadoes: 1 confirmed
- Max. rating: EFU tornado

Overall effects
- Fatalities: 0
- Injuries: 0
- Damage: Unknown
- Areas affected: Areas north of Cullison, and west, north and south of Iuka

=== Iuka, Kansas ===
==== Fourth touchdown and rapid intensification ====
The parent supercell continued to move to the east and exited Kiowa County completely. At around 10:47 PM CDT (03:47 UTC) a new tornado developed to the north of Cullison, located in western Pratt County.

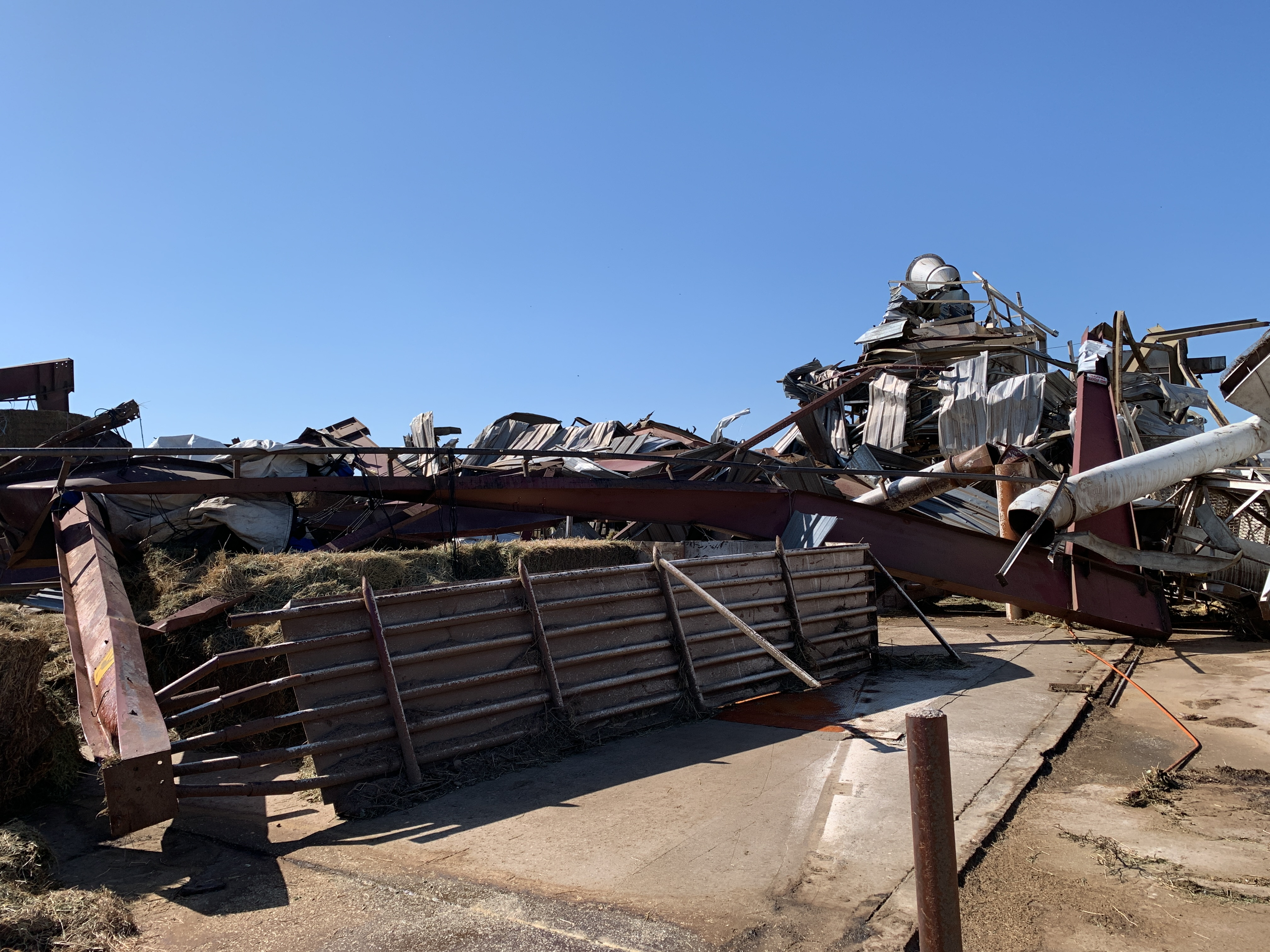
A metal farm building destroyed at high-end EF3 strength north of Cullison.

The tornado, at EF0 strength, quickly widened and flipped a pivot along Northwest 20th Street. Up ahead and south of Northwest 30th Street, another irrigation pivot system was impacted, though this one was partially separated. After doing this, the tornado rapidly intensified to high-end EF3 strength when nearing Northwest 70th Avenue, with estimated windspeeds of 160 mph (260 km/h) as it impacted an animal feeding farm complex. At the site, the tornado completely destroyed a metal building which garnered it its rating. Elsewhere at this location, a farmhouse suffered major EF2 roof damage, and a shelter belt surrounding the complex was completely destroyed as trees were stubbed and debarked at low-end EF3 intensity.

==== Steady weakening and death ====
Leaving the scene, the storm paralleled Northwest 30th Avenue to the east, causing damage to another pivot before moving slightly more northeast. EF2 damage again occurred, as the tornado broke wooden utility poles on Northwest 50th Avenue. At the same spot, a grapple bucket was found in a nearby field. Another instance of EF2 pole damage occurred at Northwest 40th Avenue, to the west of a farmstead.

Moving northwest of Pratt Regional Airport, the tornado continued its journey through open farmland. In its way along Northwest 30th Avenue, the tornado caused a minor instance of EF1 damage to poles. Past that, the storm intensified again to a strong intensity as EF2 pivot damage occurred, with it being flipped and split up in pieces. The tornado began to narrow in width as it began to approach Iuka from the west, again inflicting pivot damage though at EF1 strength. North of Iuka, the tornado made an abrupt turn to the north before dissipating at around 11:08 PM CDT (04:08 UTC).

A minute later to the south of Iuka, a brief EFU satellite tornado was observed by a storm chaser during the dying phase of the larger EF3 tornado. No damage or casualties were reported by this secondary event.

Plevna, Kansas
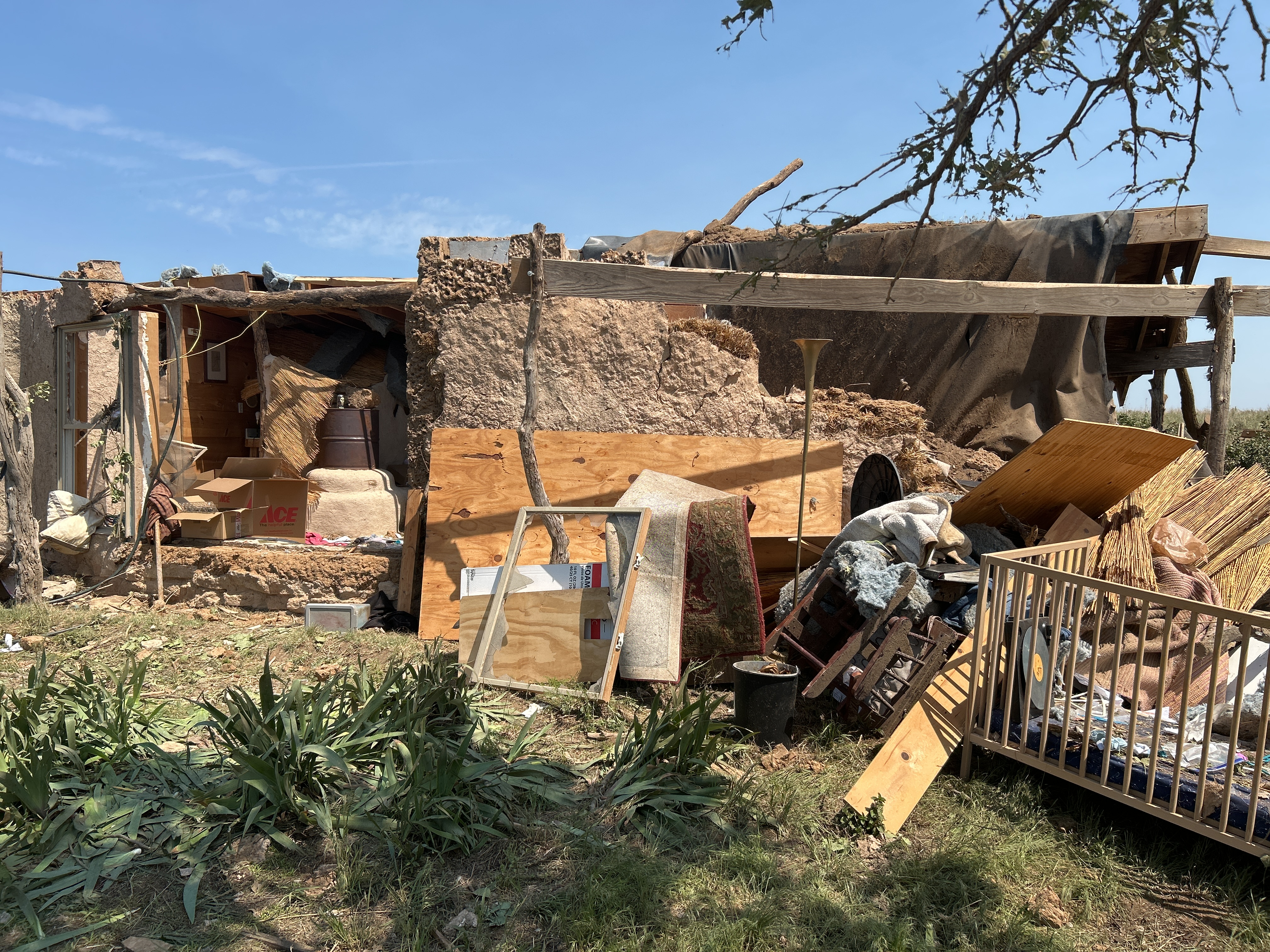
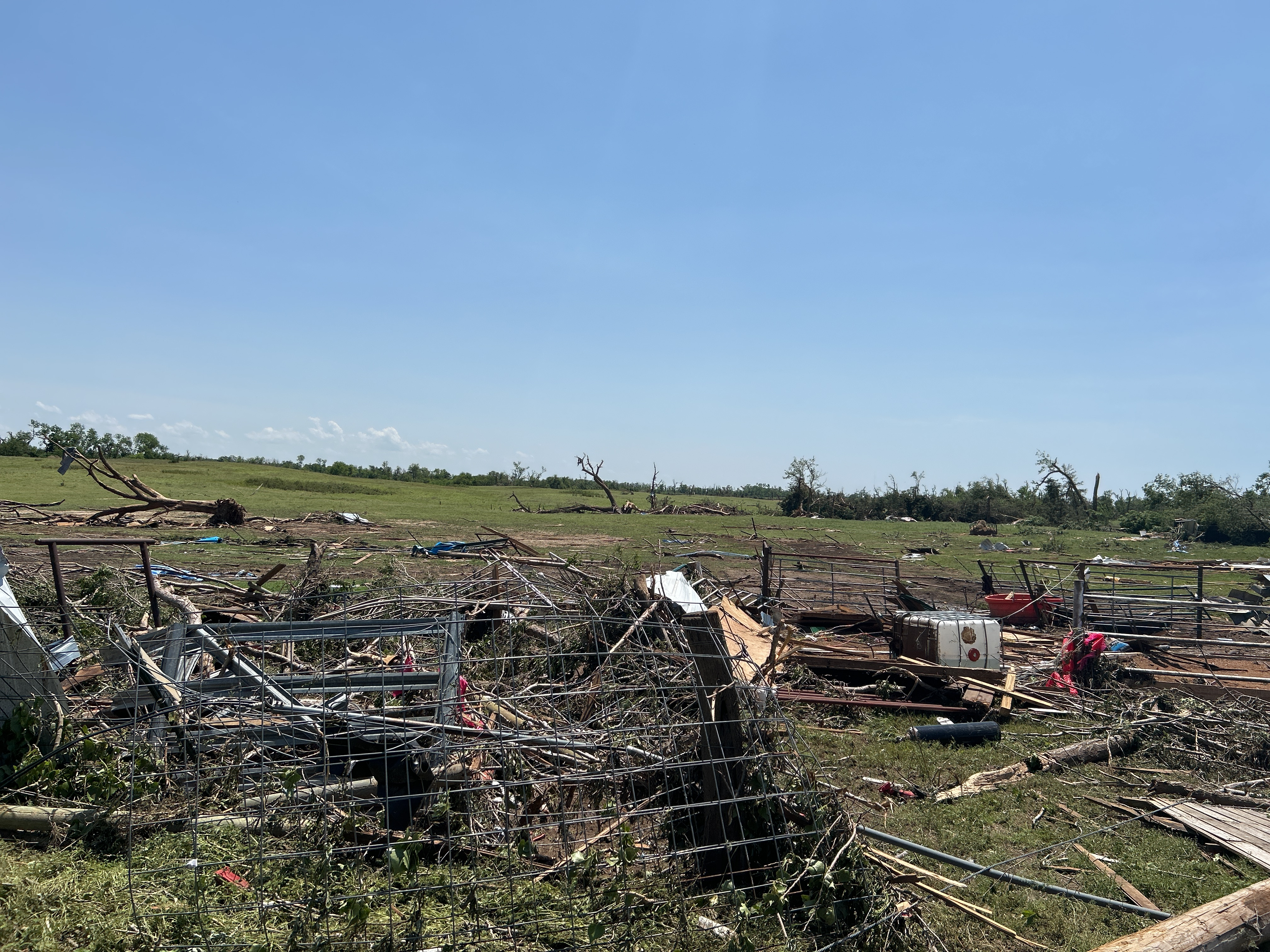
- Clockwise from top: The tornado seen northeast of Preston; tornado damage in farm fields along West Illinois Avenue; EF2 damage to an earthen house west of Plevna.

Meteorological history
- Formed: May 18, 2025, 11:17 PM CDT (UTC−05:00)
- Dissipated: May 19, 2025, 12:17 AM CDT (UTC−05:00)
- Duration: 1 hour

EF3 tornado
- on the Enhanced Fujita scale
- Max width: 1,760 yards (1.00 mi; 1.61 km)
- Path length: 32.45 miles (52.22 km)
- Highest winds: 155 mph (290 km/h)

Overall effects
- Fatalities: 0
- Injuries: 0
- Damage: Unknown
- Areas affected: Areas north of Preston, Turon and Langdon, to directly Plevna and its north

=== Plevna, Kansas ===
==== Tornado birth ====
Approximately nine minutes after the previous EF3 tornado dissipated north of Iuka, the parent storm cycled and at dropped the fifth and final intense tornado that night at 11:17 PM CDT (04:17 UTC) along Northeast 50th Avenue to the west-northwest of Preston. This long-tracked tornado (Note: Long-track is defined as traversing 30–60 miles (48–97 km) or more.) started within a tree line at EF0 intensity, snapping branches before quickly moving into open fields and widening. Towards the intersection of Northeast 100th Street and Northeast 60th Avenue, the storm within a short amount of time intensified abruptly, causing EF3 damage to a farm as surrounding trees were debarked and a metal building was destroyed with approaching 145–155 mph (233–249 km/h) winds. The tornado maintained its EF3 intensity status to both Northeast 70th and 80th Avenues, as trees from this specific area of the tornado were debarked.

==== Traversing Pratt to Reno Counties ====
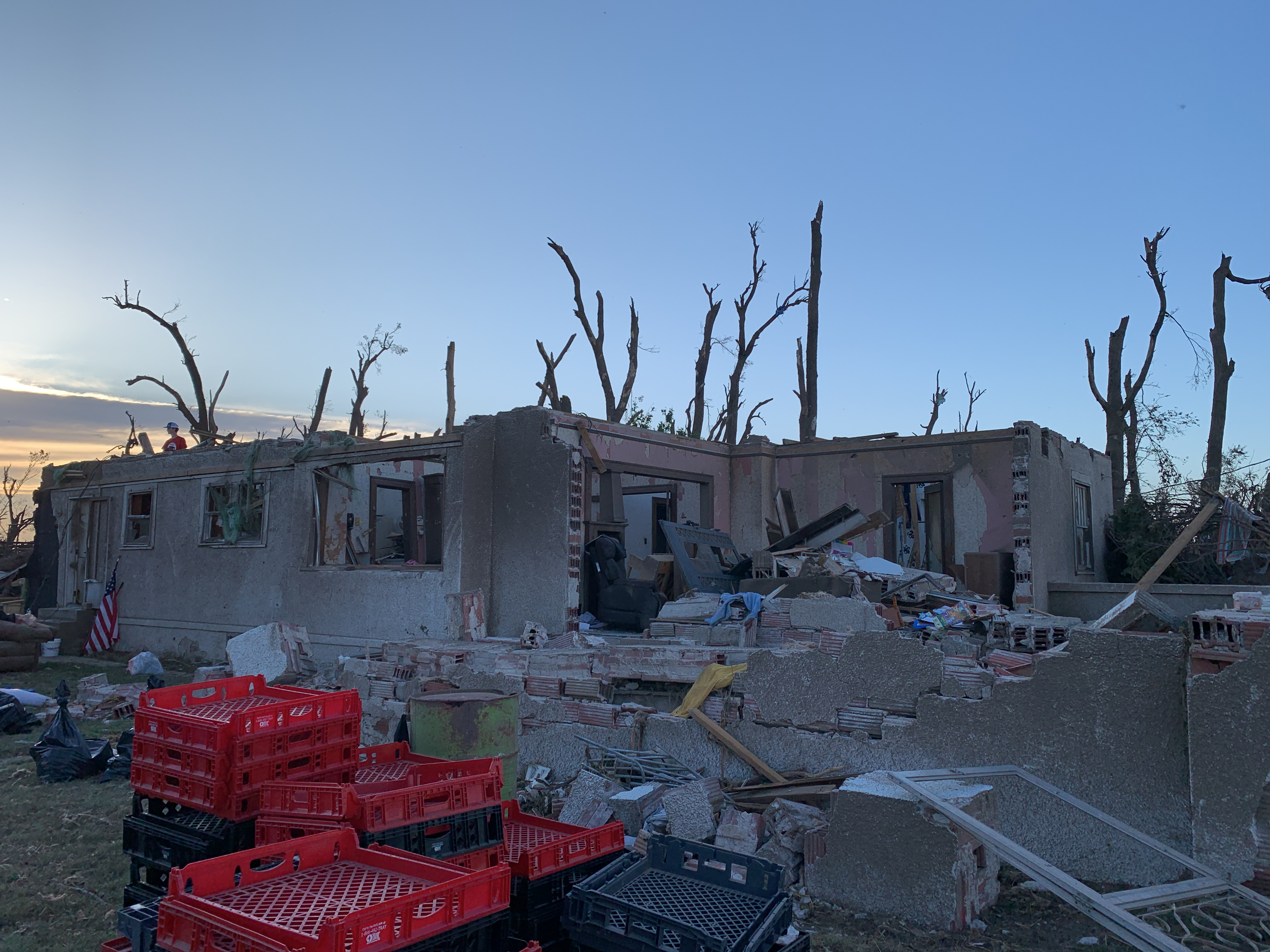
EF3 roof damage inflicted to a well-built farmhouse in Stafford County.

After rapid strengthening, the tornado weakened down to EF2 intensity as it began paralleling Northeast 110th Street. Along the road, the tornado flipped an irrigation pivot and caused a 0.5 mi (0.80 km) wide swath of broken wooden electrical poles. Traveling eastward and passing over the four-way junction east of Northeast 90th Avenue, the tornado regained high-end EF3 strength as it impacted a property. A metal building was obliterated, while the walls of a home were collapsed at this spot. To the northeast, the tornado deposited multiple crude oil tanks, some tossed over hundreds of yards. At the same time, the tornado widened significantly as it began approaching the Pratt–Stafford County border. Crossing over, the tornado impacted oil derricks and tossed them several hundreds of yards away. Over to the east, the tornado flipped one irrigation pivot at mid-range EF2 intensity, before gaining EF3 intensity as a shelter belt was debarked to the northeast. Another shelter belt north also got impacted, but at a lesser EF2 intensity with mainly snapped tree trunks. The tornado then began to narrow in size, but got stronger after crossing through fields northeast of Southeast 80th Avenue. Southeast of Neola, one tree belt was impacted at low-end EF3 intensity, before the tornado then encroached onto a homestead on Southeast 140th Avenue, and causing high-end EF3 destruction. A metal building was completely destroyed and was the highest rated damage. A nearby, well-built farmhouse suffered EF3 roof damage, and trees surrounding the homestead were debarked. Consistent EF3 damage occurred along Southeast 70th Street, and an approximately 0.75 mi (1.21 km) wide swath of broken electrical wood poles dotted the road and a forested area was debarked. More trees were damaged at EF2 intensity, right before the storm exited Stafford County.

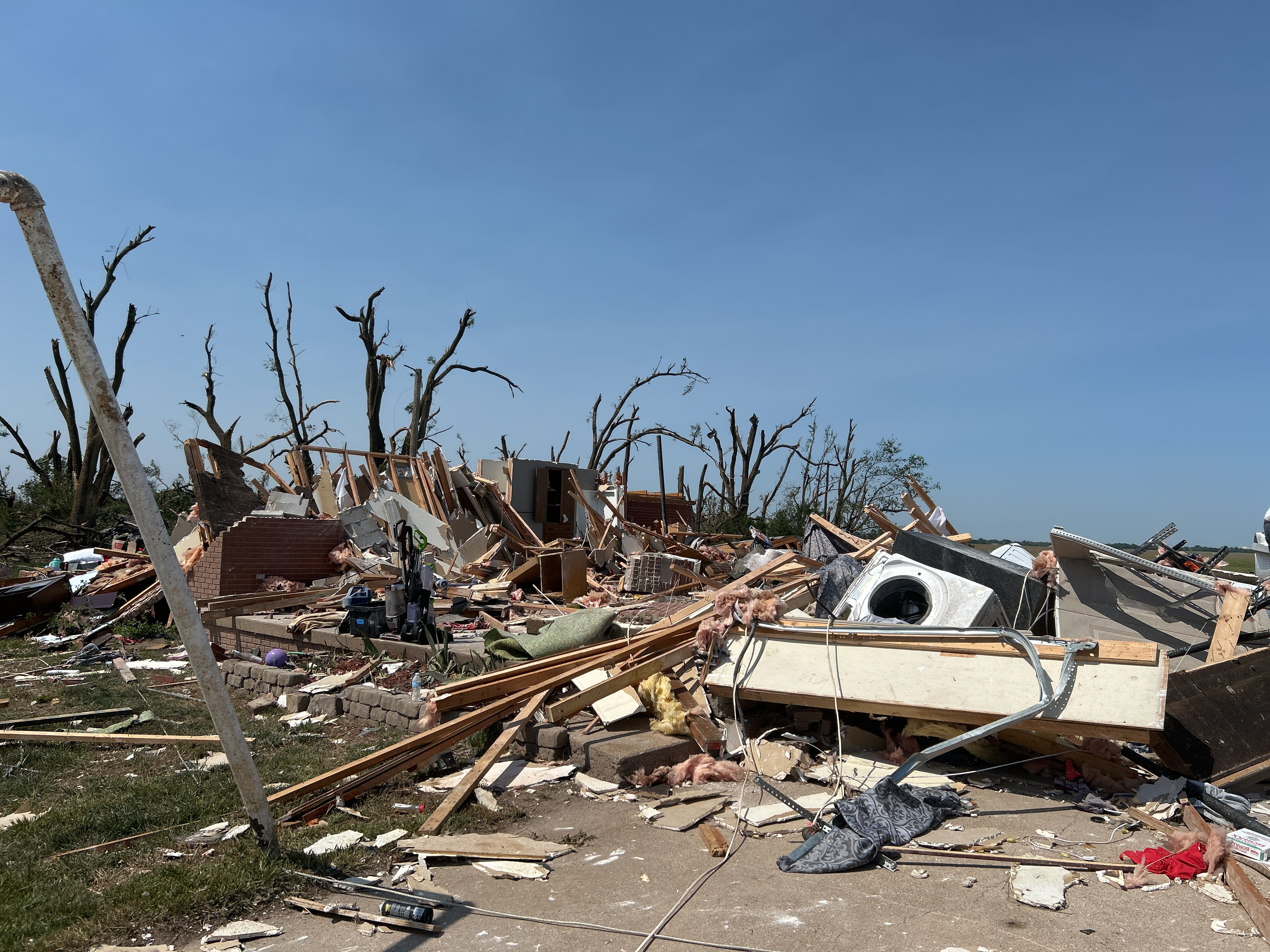
A residence on South Langdon Road had most of its walls collapsed.

The tornado then entered Reno County northwest of Turon, into the regional county warning area of the National Weather Service in Wichita at 11:35 PM CDT (04:35 UTC). A particularly dangerous situation tornado warning was issued at 11:21 PM CDT (04:21 UTC) in western Reno County, fourteen minutes earlier. EF1–EF2 damage occurred as the tornado tracked north of Turon, at first snapping 8 poles along West Irish Creek Road. The storm then passed southeast of a farm located west of the intersection of Arlington Road and South Netherland Road, causing EF2 tree damage and lifting a metal outbuilding's roof off on the tornado's western flank. To the east, 508 yd (465 m) of trees were considerably destroyed, and a nearby irrigation pivot was turned over 486 yd (444 m) from Arlington Road. Northwest of Langdon, the large tornado fluctuated between EF1–EF2 strength as it primarily impacted more trees and poles. The PDS warning was then upgraded to a tornado emergency at 11:50 PM CDT (04:50 UTC) with the small cities of Sylvia, Plevna and Abbyville having 35 minutes of lead time. On South Langdon Road, directly to the north of Langdon, the tornado re-intensified back to EF3 status as it impacted and collapsed most brick exterior walls of a residence with 145 mph (233 km/h). An outbuilding also was completely destroyed at mid-range EF2 strength.

==== Impact on Plevna and end stage ====
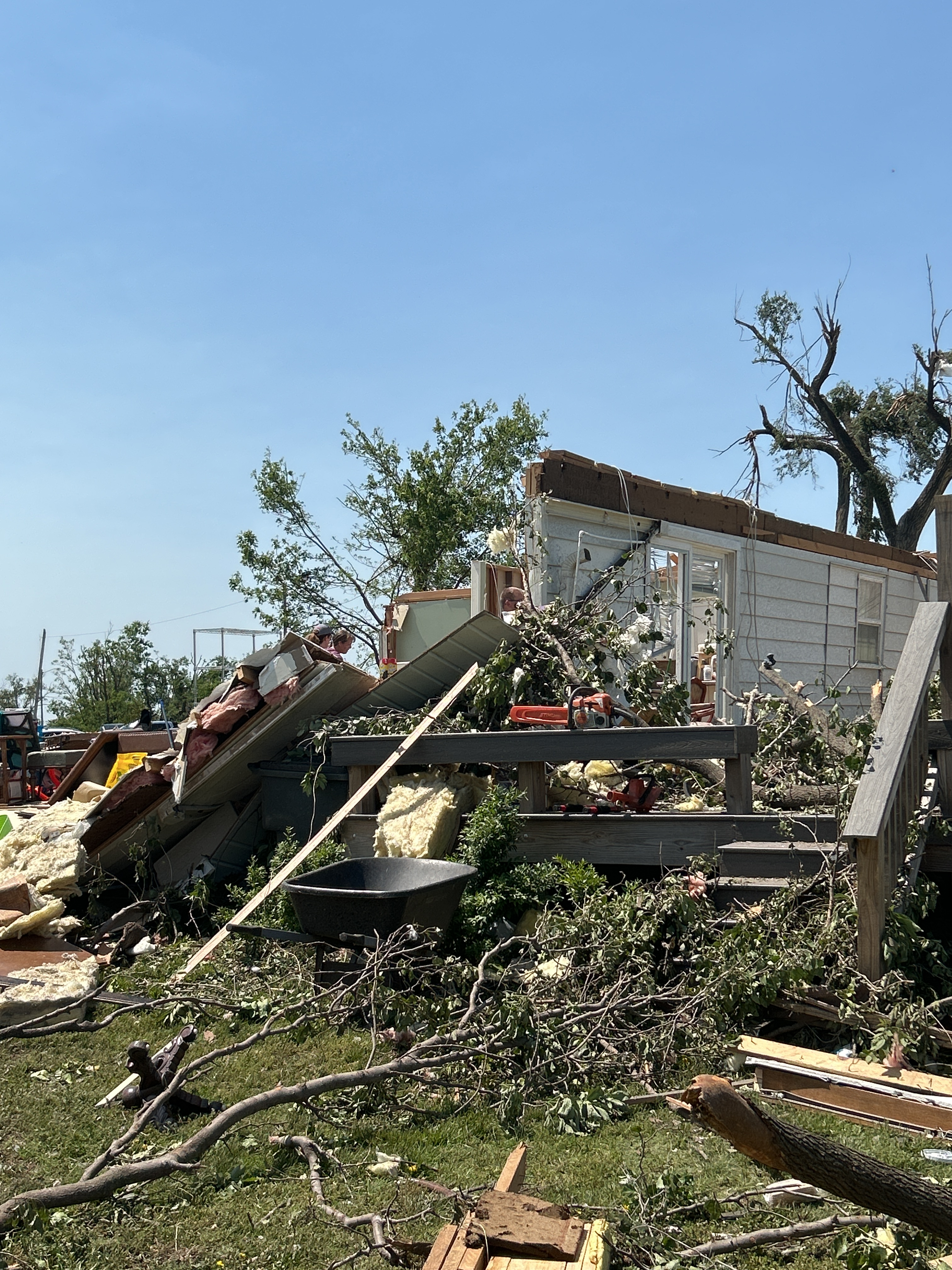
Exterior walls of a home torn down at high-end EF2 intensity in Plevna.

After passing north of Long View Road, the tornado made a beeline towards Plevna, impacting the community right at 12:00 AM CDT (05:00 UTC) on May 19. (Note: The timestamp is based on an EF2 damage indicator "storm date" via the NOAA Damage Assessment Toolkit (DAT). The particular EF2 damage indicator is located just outside and west of Plevna, along West Trail West Road.) Spots of EF2 damage in Plevna occurred in the southwestern and western sides of town. The first structure impacted was located right outside of Plevna proper along West Trail West Road. Here, a van was tossed 40 yd (37 m) while pieces of a shed were thrown some 100 yd (91 m) away. The main residence was an earthen home with exterior wall and roof damage. On South Snyder Street, one house sustained high-end EF2 intensity damage as most of the roof was peeled away. Over to the east situated at West 5th Avenue, a mobile home was detached from its undercarriage and heavily damaged with 120 mph (190 km/h) estimated winds. The tornado paralleled South Snyder Street as it began to move northwards, impacting another house at high-end EF2 intensity on West 3rd Avenue which had half of its exterior walls torn down. A nearby radio tower was bent down in this spot as well. The remainder of the damage in the city was rated EF0–EF1 before the tornado exited through the northern side.

North of Plevna, the tornado regained significant status again, as a farmstead along West Illinois Avenue was impacted. Mid-range EF2 damage was inflicted to a barn on the property while EF1 damage occurred to numerous uprooted trees. The last area of significant (EF2+) damage occurred on West 4th Avenue, with some 20 poles snapped on both sides of the road. The tornado then began to head north-northwest, causing insignificant EF0–EF1 damage to homesteads before dissipating at 12:20 AM CDT (05:20 UTC) in rural northwestern Reno County.

== Aftermath ==
=== Damage assessments ===
During the daytime hours of May 19, 2025, the National Weather Service offices in both Dodge City, Wichita, and Goodland conducted their surveys in their respective counties. Other tornadoes, not related to the five EF3 tornadoes plus their satellites from Comanche to Reno Counties, also occurred on May 18 in other parts of the Kansas. For example, four tornadoes, rated EF2 and EF3 struck around Scott City to Grinnell areas, as part of the primarily May 18 tornado outbreak. No deaths or injuries were reported.

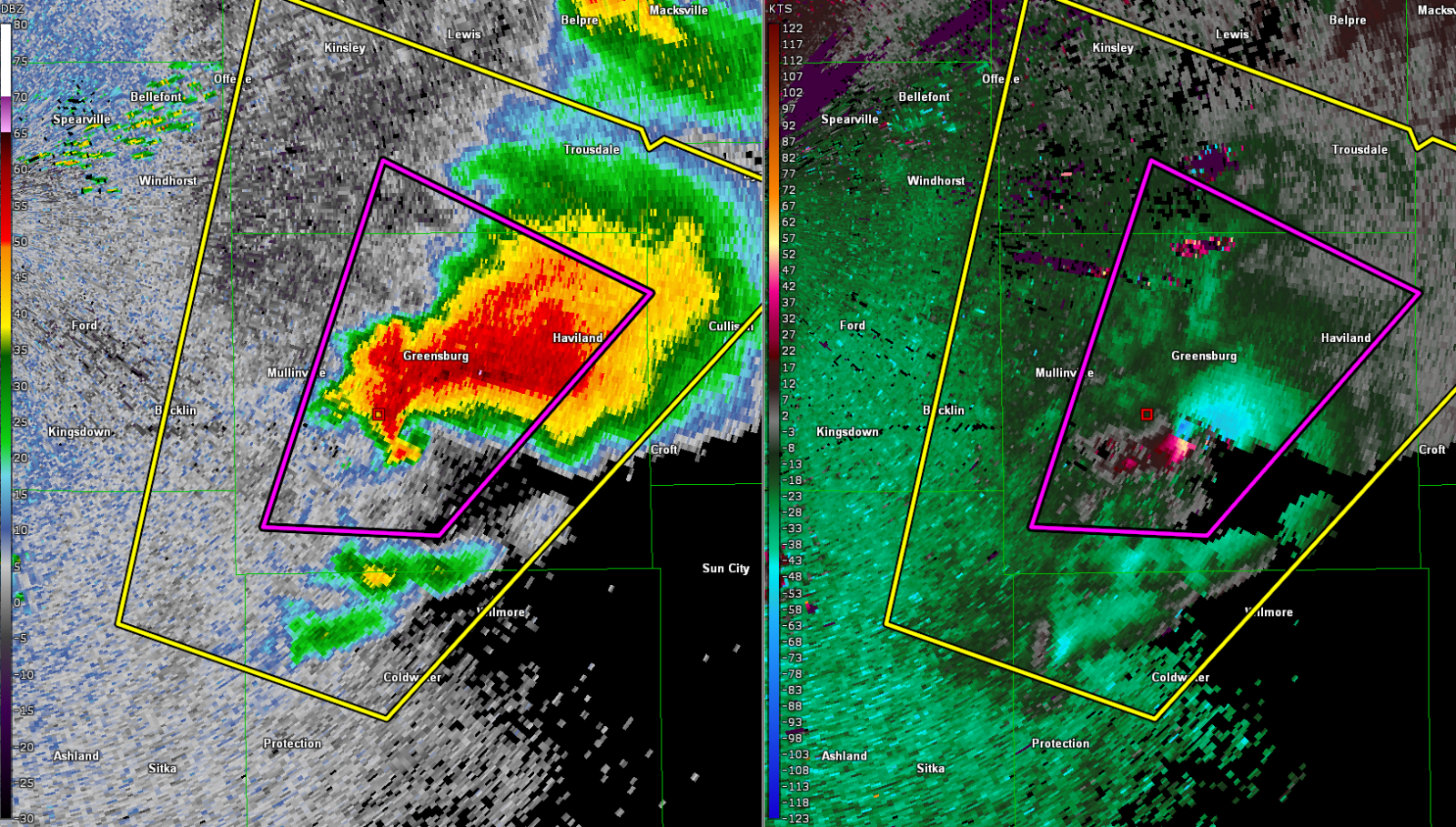
WSR-88D radar scan of the storm, with Greensburg inside the Particularly Dangerous Situation warning polygon.

The first EF3 tornado that traveled mainly across rural southwest Kiowa County tracked a 8.18 mi (13.16 km) long path. It was the second largest tornado out of the series at 800 yd (0.45 mi; 0.73 km) wide, according to the National Centers for Environmental Information (NCEI). The tornado lasted approximately 17 minutes and only struck one farmstead throughout its life, with no other buildings impacted. The second EF3 tornado that prompted a tornado emergency for Greensburg and the surrounding areas, was smaller at 500 yd (0.28 mi; 0.46 km) but traveled farther at a length of 10.41 mi (16.75 km). It lasted longer than the previous tornado, at 22 minutes. A secondary satellite vortex also occurred with this tornado, and caused EF1 damage. The third EF3 tornado, which struck west and north of Haviland, was of similar width to the prior second tornado of the five. It tracked for 15.09 mi (24.29 km) along a 35-minute lifespan. an EF1 satellite tornado north of Brenham accompanied this tornado.

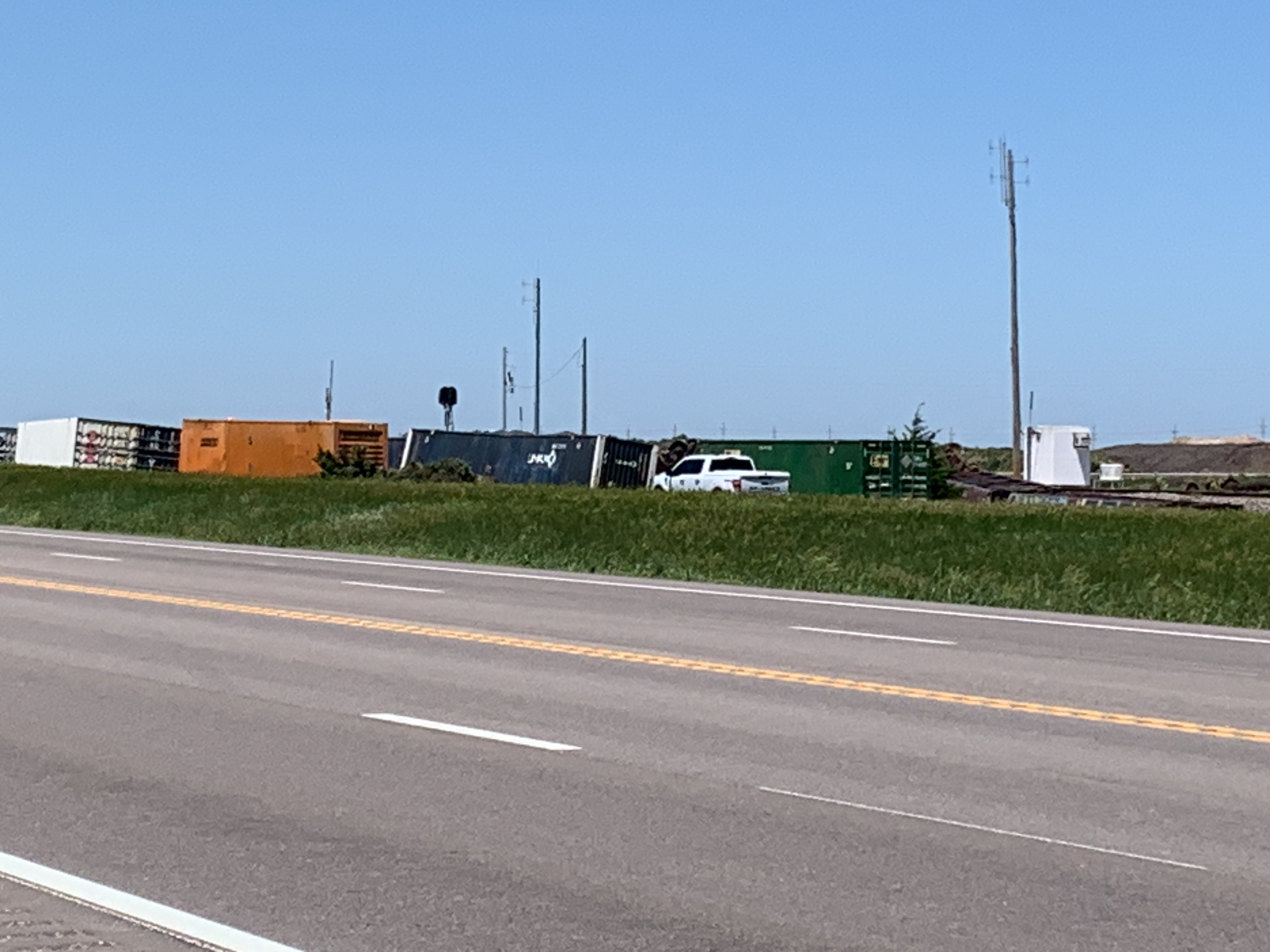
Freight train derailed west of Haviland.

The fourth EF3 tornado spawned by the supercell, that traversed from north of Cullison to the Iuka area, was the highest rated tornado out of the five, with estimated winds of 160 mph (260 km/h) at a farm. It tracked a 11.45 mi (18.43 km) long and 500 yd (0.28 mi; 0.46 km) wide track through areas northwest of Pratt, having been on the ground for 21 minutes total. An EFU satellite tornado was documented by the NCEI around the time of the parent EF3 tornado's dissipation. The fifth and final EF3 tornado of the entire event was the widest at 1,760 yd (1.00 mi; 1.61 km), the longest tracked for 32.45 mi (52.22 km), and had the longest time duration at one hour and three minutes, compared to the previous four EF3 tornadoes. This tornado was the only one out of the five to directly impact a community. However, the highest rated damage accounted by this tornado was at multiple farmsteads and isolated residences across rural Pratt, Stafford and Reno Counties, rather than at Plevna.

=== Regional impact ===
The tornado family caused significant disruptions, primarily to agricultural infrastructure. Almost all of the tornadoes from that night, besides the tornado that struck Plevna head on, mostly struck rural homes and farmsteads.

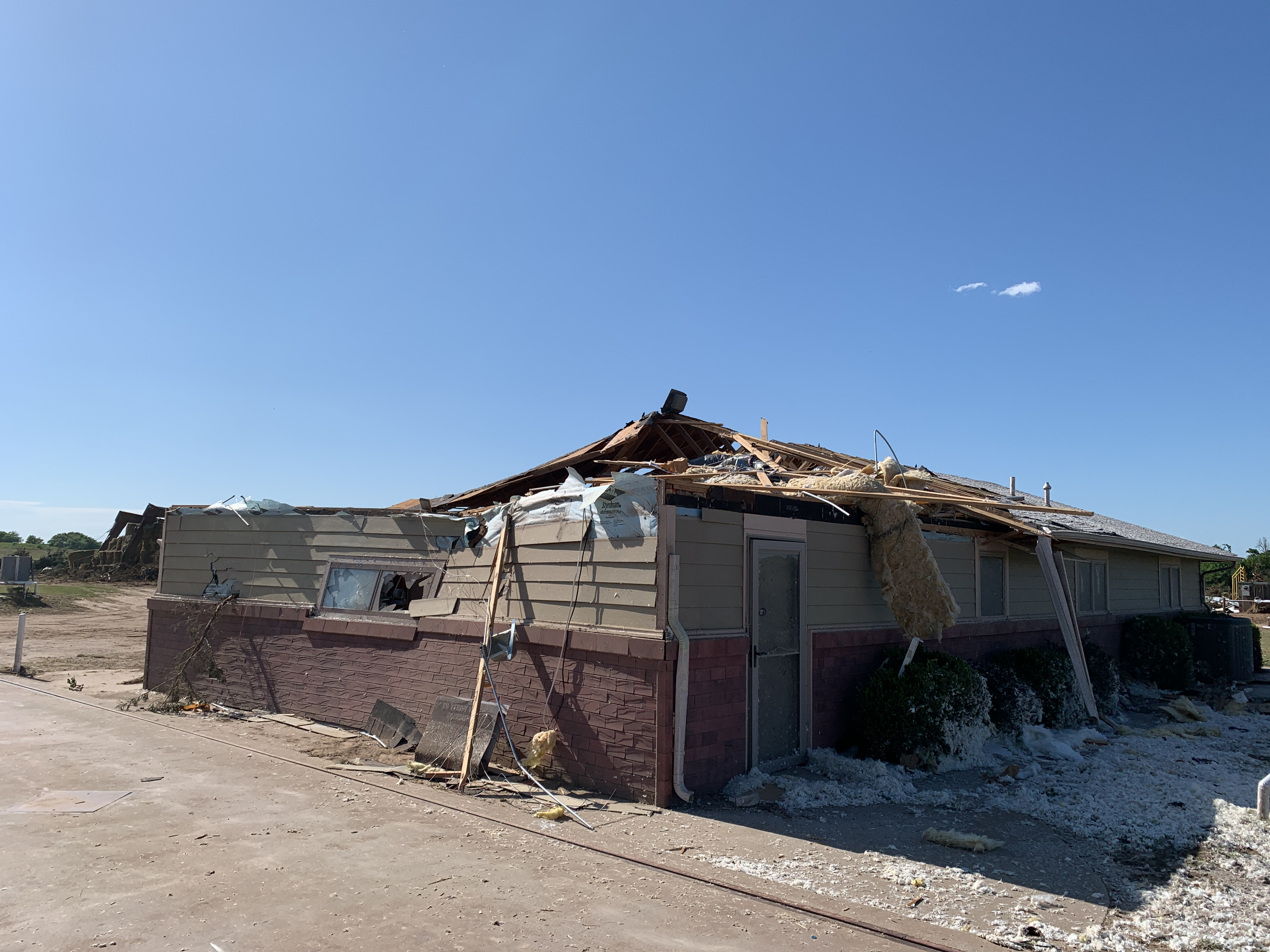
Near Cullison, a home belonging to the Great Plains Alfalfa complex was heavily damaged.

In rural Kiowa County, one family quickly sought shelter in their farmhouse, before the approaching tornado arrived 45 seconds after the emergency alert was issued. After the tornado, they emerged to only find their home still intact, while the rest of the homestead was destroyed. Near Haviland, one of the tornadoes struck a stalled Union Pacific cargo train, derailing around 100 rail cars. The railroad stated that no injuries or fatalities occurred at the train, and no hazardous materials were released. In Pratt County, an alfalfa plant was impacted by one of the storms. The day after the tornado struck, workers assessed the damage and discovered large metal bins and trees were blown over, structures damaged or destroyed, and alfalfa bales knocked over and split open.

One of the more notable tornadoes of the event, was the EF3 tornado that occurred nearby Greensburg. Stacy Barnes, Greensburg's city administrator, said the similarities between this tornado and the EF5 tornado from 18 years prior were eerily identical to one another. Residents only dealt with power outages in 2025. The tornado prompted the second tornado emergency ever in Greensburg's history, and is cited to be a testament to what can happen in the future once climate change affects. The most significant tornado of the evening, the one that made a direct hit on Plevna, inflicted relatively widespread damage along its path. In the small township of 85 people, residents took shelter in their basements or in the community church when the tornado entered the town. The church was not directly hit by the tornado. In western Plevna and the township's outskirts, several mobile homes were flipped, houses were damaged or destroyed, and trees were downed with their branches broken. In regard of the tornado's devastation in the township, no injuries or deaths occurred.

=== Recovery ===
==== Local support ====
Following the tornadoes, emergency protocols were issued by the Reno County Emergency Management. Residents were urged to avoid affected areas and barricaded roads, not enter damaged buildings unless deemed safe, and call and report 911 when encountering downed powerlines or gas leaks. On May 19, a Reno County volunteer group, Voluntary Organizations Active in Disaster or VOAD, opened up a so-called "Multi-Agency Resource Center" (MARC) at the Abbyville Community Church, which was open from 4:00–6:00 PM CDT (21:00–23:00 UTC). The American Red Cross also operated a 24-hour emergency shelter at this location. In Plevna, city-wide projects took place to clean up debris one of the tornadoes left behind. Schools, such as Fairfield USD 310, canceled all classes and allowed victims to use their buildings shower inside, and as shelter against the elements. By May 22, hundreds of volunteers came into Plevna to help restore lost belongings and properties of residents. Residents at the same time organized a fundraiser to save the town's historic community building, which was at risk to be demolished due to lack of insurance.

On November 18, six months after the tornado events, residents of Plevna reflected on their reconstruction process. Repair of electrical, HVAC, and plumbing services were largely finished in the small town. One woman and her family who survived the tornado southwest of Plevna on South Langdon Road, vividly remembered the surreal moments during the tornado. The family hoped to live back in the home in the spring of 2026. One year after by May 18, 2026, Plevna continues to recover from the tornado.

During recovery, one big problem that stood in the way for some residents, was the issue with home insurance. Of the nineteen families seeking aid and assistance in Plevna with home insurance, ten of them did not have any. One family was among the several that did not have insurance. Due to rising costs, they dropped theirs three weeks before the tornado. They faced up with high repair costs and long-term debt. The high demand of contractors in Plevna also created a labor shortage, forcing many families and victims of the tornado to reside into temporary housing methods.

==== State and federal aid ====
In June 2025, Kansas governor Laura Kelly stated that since day one of the recovery process of the state, she was committed to provide technical, logistical, environmental and health resources to the affected counties, alongside advocating necessities to the Federal Emergency Management Agency (FEMA) and the Small Business Administration (SBA). During the day of the tornadoes and floods on May 18 and the following days, the Kansas Division of Emergency Management (KDEM) began their response with local officials. Alongside FEMA and the SBA, KDEM coordinated damage assessments, humanitarian services with volunteer organizations, and technical recovery assistance. By June 4, governor Kelly issued a disaster declaration for the counties of Bourbon, Cheyenne, Edwards, Gove, Logan, Scott and Sheridan, alongside Kiowa, Pratt, Reno and Stafford Counties. The day after on June 5, Kansas initiated a joint Public Assistance Program Preliminary Damage Assessments (PDA) which was assisted by KDEM and FEMA's Region VII. PDA teams examined the damage to public infrastructure, which included roads, bridges and utilities to determine if the damage reached the threshold needed to formally request a presidential disaster declaration.

On June 17, 2025, Kelly requested a statewide disaster declaration to FEMA, which was under the second tenure of U.S. president Donald Trump. One month later, on July 23, Trump approved the request by Laura Kelly for the state of Kansas. A Public Assistance fund campaign was exclusively eligible to the state, particular tribal and local governments, and certain private non-profit organizations across the previously mentioned counties. By September 17, FEMA put out a notice that Individual Assistance (IA) was not approved for the counties affected by the storms and flooding in mid-May. FEMA aid was instead partially directed for the possible restoration of infrastructure and utilities. The reasoning behind this, was due to the presence of historical properties and activities located in the wetlands or the 100–500-year-old flood plains. Extensive IA activities could cause disruptions to regions already vulnerable from flooding that had occurred months earlier.

== See also ==
- Weather of 2025
- Tornadoes of 2025
- List of F3, EF3, and IF3 tornadoes (2020–present)
- 2014 Pilger tornado family – An identical event where one cyclical supercell produced four EF4 tornadoes in Nebraska
- 2017 East Texas tornadoes – Another similar event with multiple tornadoes, including some strong to violent in Texas
- April 2011 Iowa tornadoes – A regional tornado event that produced a cyclical supercell and tornado family in Iowa, including several strong to violent tornadoes
- Tornado outbreak of May 4–6, 2007 – A volatile tornado outbreak where a cyclical supercell produced many tornadoes, including the Greensburg EF5 tornado, across southern to central Kansas
- Tornado outbreak of May 22–27, 2008 – A severe weather and tornado outbreak sequence, where on May 23 multiple strong to violent, and large tornadoes struck a similar areas of Kansas
- Tornado outbreak of April 13–16, 2012 – A tornado outbreak, where on April 14, a family of large EF3 tornadoes with satellites tore across the same region in Kansas
