= William Prescott (disambiguation) =

William Prescott (1726–1795) was an American colonel in the Revolutionary War.

William Prescott may also refer to:

- William Prescott Jr. (1762–1844), United States lawyer
- William Prescott (physician) (1788–1875), United States physician, politician, and naturalist
- William H. Prescott (1796–1859), American historian
- W. W. Prescott (William Warren Prescott, 1855–1944), Seventh-Day Adventist leader
- Sir William Prescott, 1st Baronet (1874–1945), British engineer and Conservative Party politician
- William Robert Stanley Prescott (1912–1962), Conservative Party politician in the United Kingdom
- William Prescott (Kansas politician) (born 1954), member of the Kansas House of Representatives
- Sir William Prescott, a steam engine, see Kempton Park Steam Engines
