= Humerickhouse =

Humerickhouse is a surname. Notable people with the surname include:

- Dave Humerickhouse (1924–2007), American basketball player
- Joe Humerickhouse (born 1940), American politician
