= Connie O'Brien =

American politician

Member of the Kansas State Board of Education from the 4th district
- Incumbent
- Assumed office January 13, 2025
- Preceded by: Ann Mah

Member of the Kansas House of Representatives from the 42nd district
- In office January 12, 2009 – January 9, 2017
- Preceded by: Kenny Wilk
- Succeeded by: Jim Karleskint

Personal details
- Born: October 12, 1946 (age 79)
- Party: Republican
- Spouse: Edward O'Brien
- Children: 11
- Education: University of Saint Mary (BA)

Connie O'Brien (born October 12, 1946) is a Republican politician and member of the Kansas State Board of Education, representing the 4th district since 2025. She previously served as a member of the Kansas House of Representatives from the 42nd district from 2009 to 2017.

== Early life ==
O'Brien attended Saint Mary College, graduating with her bachelor's degree in secondary education and social studies. She worked as the director of religious education at the Sacred Heart Catholic Church in Tonganoxie and taught in Leavenworth County schools as a special education teacher.

== Kansas House of Representatives ==
In 2008, Republican State Representative Kenny Wilk declined to seek re-election and O'Brien ran to succeed him in the 42nd district. She defeated Ted Ingerson in the Republican primary by a wide margin, and faced Democratic nominee Timothy Moran in the general election. O'Brien handily defeated Moran, winning 60% of the vote.

In 2010, she ran for re-election and faced Democrat Jim Pittman, the chairman of the Lansing Planning Commission. She won her second term in a landslide, receiving 65% of the vote to Pittman's 35%.

== Kansas State Board of Education ==
In 2024, Ann Mah, who served as a member of the Kansas State Board of Education from the 4th district, declined to seek re-election. O'Brien ran to succeed her, positioning herself as a socially conservative candidate supportive of parental rights. She received the endorsement of state Attorney General Kris Kobach, and ultimately won the Republican primary with 45% of the vote to Nancy Moneymaker's 36% and Gina Montalbano Zesiger's 19%. In the general election, she was opposed by Kris Meyer, the Democratic nominee and a former elementary school principal. O'Brien narrowly defeated Meyer, winning 51% of the vote to Meyer's 49%, providing conservatives with a majority on the Board.
