= Huntsville, Kansas =

Unincorporated community in Reno County, Kansas

Coordinates: 38°03′26″N 98°19′33″W

Huntsville is an unincorporated community in Reno County, Kansas, United States. It is located north of Plevna along 4th Ave.

== History ==
A post office was opened in Huntsville in 1878, and remained in operation until it was discontinued in 1905.

== Education ==
The community is served by Fairfield USD 310 public school district.
