= Jim Karleskint =

American politician

Member of the Kansas House of Representatives from the 42nd district
- In office January 9, 2017 – January 11, 2021
- Preceded by: Connie O'Brien
- Succeeded by: Lance Neelly

Personal details
- Born: October 17, 1947 (age 78)
- Party: Republican
- Spouse: Dee
- Profession: Educator

Jim Karleskint (born October 17, 1947) is an American politician. He served as a Republican member for the 42nd district in the Kansas House of Representatives from 2017 to 2020.
