= Denise Everhart =

American politician

Member of the Kansas House of Representatives from the 53rd district
- In office 1991–1994
- Preceded by: Bill Roy Jr.
- Succeeded by: Dixie Toelkes

Member of the Kansas House of Representatives from the 59th district
- In office 1989–1990
- Succeeded by: Elaine Wells

Personal details
- Born: Denise Lee Allen; June 7, 1954 (age 72) Topeka, KS
- Party: Democratic
- Spouse: Vernon Everhart
- Children: 2
- Education: Washburn University, Washburn School of Law

Denise Everhart (born June 7, 1954) is an American politician who served as a Democratic member of the Kansas House of Representatives from 1989 to 1994. A resident of Topeka, Kansas, she represented the 53rd and 59th House districts.

Everhart was initially elected to the 59th district and served one term there before switching to the 53rd district.
