= Blake Carpenter =

American politician (born 1991)

Speaker pro tempore of the Kansas House of Representatives
- Incumbent
- Assumed office January 9, 2023
- Preceded by: Blaine Finch

Member of the Kansas House of Representatives from the 81st district
- Incumbent
- Assumed office January 9, 2023
- Preceded by: Leah Howell

Member of the Kansas House of Representatives from the 81st district
- In office January 12, 2015 – January 8, 2023
- Preceded by: Jim Howell
- Succeeded by: Leah Howell

Personal details
- Born: January 14, 1991 (age 35) Norman, Oklahoma, U.S.
- Party: Republican
- Spouse: Cziara
- Education: Wichita State University (BBA)

Blake Carpenter (born January 14, 1991) is a Republican member of the Kansas House of Representatives, representing the 81st district and is currently the speaker pro tem. He has served since 2015.

== Biography ==
Carpenter's first step into politics was during college. While attending Wichita State University, he joined the College Republicans. After a few months of being actively involved with the group, he was elected vice-chairman in spring 2013. During the fall semester of 2013 the chairman of the College Republicans stepped down, and Carpenter stepped into the chairman's role. Carpenter remained the chairman until the end of the 2014 spring semester.

During the 2014 spring semester Carpenter had a class project to interview a state representative. He decided to interview his state representative who was Jim Howell. Howell was stepping down to run for the Sedgwick County Commission. During their conversation, Carpenter said he wanted to run for public office someday, and Howell asked him "Why not just do it now?”. After some consideration, Carpenter decided to run and began gathering petition signatures to get his name on the ballot. During the 2014 election cycle, Carpenter ran against Democrat Lynn Wells. In an interview with the Derby Informer newspaper, Carpenter described himself as having conservative values. Carpenter defeated Wells in the November general election.

After the election ended in November 2014, he graduated from Wichita State University in December with a Bachelor of Business Administration degree. He currently serves as the House Majority Whip, a position he was elected to in December 2018, for a term starting in January 2019.

Carpenter and wife Cziara married each other in December 2013.

Representative Carpenter announced in October 2021 that he would be taking a leave of absence for the 2022 legislative session in order to complete a military obligation as an officer in the Kansas Air National Guard. Leah Howell, his predecessor's wife, was selected by Republican precinct committee members in the 81st District on Jan. 8, 2022 to serve in Representative Carpenter's place for the 2022 legislative session.

Kansas House of Representatives
Preceded by Blaine Finch	Speaker pro tempore of the Kansas House of Representatives; 2023–present	Incumbent
