= Jim Howell (Kansas politician) =

American politician

Member of the Kansas House of Representatives from the 82nd district
- In office 2011–2012
- Succeeded by: Peter DeGraaf

Member of the Kansas House of Representatives from the 81st district
- In office 2013–2014
- Preceded by: Peter DeGraaf
- Succeeded by: Blake Carpenter

Personal details
- Party: Republican
- Spouse: Leah Howell
- Children: 5
- Education: Southern Illinois University; Friends University

Jim Howell is an American politician who served in the Kansas House of Representatives as a Republican from 2011 to 2014. He was initially elected to the 82nd district, winning easily in the general election with 73% of the vote. In 2012, he ran for re-election in the 81st district due to redistricting and won an additional term with 65% of the vote. He declined to run for re-election to the state legislature in 2014. As of 2023, Howell serves as a member of the Sedgwick County Commission.
