= Fairfield USD 310 =

Public school district near Langdon, Kansas

Address
- 16115 S. Langdon Rd. Langdon, Kansas, 67583; United States
- Coordinates: 37°52′12″N 98°19′23″W

District information
- Type: Public
- Grades: K to 12

Other information
- Website: usd310.org

Fairfield USD 310 is a public unified school district headquartered about 1 mile north of Langdon, Kansas, United States. The district includes the communities of Abbyville, Arlington, Huntsville, Langdon, Lerado, Plevna, Sylvia, Turon, and nearby rural areas.

== Schools ==
The school district headquarters and the following schools are all located within the same school grounds.

- Fairfield High School
- Fairfield Middle School
- Fairfield Elementary School

== See also ==
- Kansas State Department of Education
- Kansas State High School Activities Association
- List of high schools in Kansas
- List of unified school districts in Kansas
