= Nancy Kirk (politician) =

American politician (born 1942)

Member of the Kansas House of Representatives from the 56th district
- In office 1995–2006
- Preceded by: Kathleen Sebelius
- Succeeded by: Annie Tietze

Personal details
- Born: August 8, 1942 (age 83) Oak Park, Illinois
- Party: Democratic

Nancy A. Kirk (born August 8, 1942) is an American politician who served as a Democratic member of the Kansas House of Representatives from 1995 to 2006. She represented the 56th District and lived in Topeka, Kansas. Kirk won election to the open seat after the incumbent, Kathleen Sebelius, successfully ran for Kansas Insurance Commissioner.

Kirk was re-elected for five additional terms after her first. She declined to run for re-election in 2006. In 2011, Kirk ran for a nonpartisan seat on the Topeka School Board.; she won, and was re-elected in 2015.
