= Roger Toelkes =

American politician

Roger Eugene Toelkes

Member of the Kansas House of Representatives from the 53rd district
- In office 2002–2004
- Preceded by: Dixie Toelkes
- Succeeded by: Ann Mah

Personal details
- Born: November 7, 1935 (age 90) Pueblo, Colorado, U.S.
- Party: Democratic
- Spouse(s): Dixie Toelkes (nee Hummer; m. November 27, 1954)
- Children: 2

Roger Eugene Toelkes (born November 7, 1935) is an American politician who served as a Democratic member of the Kansas House of Representatives from 2002 to 2004. He represented the 53rd District and lived in Topeka, Kansas.

Toelkes was appointed to the seat in 2002 to fill the expired term of his wife, Dixie Toelkes, who had held the seat since 1995, but resigned for health reasons. He was elected in his own right in 2002, but did not seek re-election in 2004.
