= Leah Howell =

American Republican politician from Kansas

Member of the Kansas House of Representatives from the 81st district
- In office January 10, 2022 – January 9, 2023
- Preceded by: Blake Carpenter
- Succeeded by: Blake Carpenter

Member of the Kansas House of Representatives from the 82nd district
- Incumbent
- Assumed office January 9, 2023
- Preceded by: Jesse Burris

Personal details
- Political party: Republican
- Spouse: Jim Howell
- Children: 5

Leah Howell is an American politician who is currently serving as a member of the Kansas House of Representatives for the 82nd district. A Republican from Sedgwick County, Kansas, Howell was elected by Republican precinct committee members to serve as a temporary replacement for Blake Carpenter in the 81st district, who took a leave of absence during the 2022 legislative session due to military obligations related to his role as an officer in the Kansas Air National Guard.

Howell served the duration of Carpenter's leave of absence, which is expected to last the length of the 2022 legislative session. Carpenter will reassume his legislative duties at the end of his military service. Howell was elected on January 8, 2022, and took office on January 10, 2022, when the legislative session convenes.

In 2022, Howell ran for election in her own right in the 82nd House district, beating Democrat Misti Hobbs by a 65% to 35% margin.

Howell is married to Sedgwick County Commissioner Jim Howell, who preceded Carpenter in the Kansas Legislature.

2021–2022 committee assignments:

- Federal and State Affairs
- Corrections and Juvenile Justice
- Elections
