= Peter DeGraaf =

American politician

Member of the Kansas House of Representatives from the 82nd district
- In office January 14, 2013 – May 31, 2017
- Preceded by: Jim Howell
- Succeeded by: Jesse Burris

Member of the Kansas House of Representatives from the 81st district
- In office May 29, 2008 – January 14, 2013
- Preceded by: Bruce Powers
- Succeeded by: Jim Howell

Personal details
- Born: April 11, 1957 (age 69)
- Party: Republican
- Spouse: Karen
- Children: 4
- Education: United States Air Force Academy

Peter DeGraaf (born April 11, 1957) is a Republican former member of the Kansas House of Representatives, representing District 82 from 2008 to May 31, 2017. He resigned from the state House on May 31, 2017, due to complications with Parkinson's disease.

Prior to his election to the House, DeGraaf served as Gore Township precinct committeeman, treasurer for Ray LaBoeuf for Senate, and chairman of the Sumner County Republican Central Committee. DeGraaf is a 1979 graduate of the United States Air Force Academy and an associate pastor at Faith Community Church.

== Issue positions ==
DeGraaf's website says that he is a "Conservative Republican: who believes in "lower taxes, less government, family values, better education," and "financial common sense."

DeGraaf supports restricting abortion coverage. During May 12, 2011 House debates, DeGraaf supported restrictions of health insurance coverage for abortions, including disallowing coverage for abortions in the case of rape unless the woman had purchased separate "abortion only-policies." When Rep. Barbara Bollier, a Mission Hills Republican who supports abortion rights, questioned whether women would buy abortion-only policies long before they have crisis or unwanted pregnancies or are rape victims, DeGraaf asked "We do need to plan ahead, don't we, in life?" When Bollier questioned whether a woman should be expected to plan ahead in life for the possibility of being raped and becoming pregnant, DeGraaf responded: "I have spare tire on my car. I also have life insurance. I have a lot of things that I plan ahead for."

== Committee membership ==
- Appropriations
- General Government Budget
- Financial Institutions
- Insurance

== Sponsored legislation ==
- H 2084 Cities; annexation; strip annexations restricted. March 17, 2009
- H 2150 Property taxation; 2% limit on valuation increases. February 27, 2009
- H 5014 Expanded rail service; Kansas City to Fort Worth, Texas; congratulating Kansas Department of Transportation and others; urging action. March 17, 2009

== Major donors ==
The top 5 donors to DeGraaf's 2008 campaign were:

1. 4th District Republican Central Committee $1,250
2. Kansas Republican Party $1,250
3. Kansas Independent Business PAC $1,000
4. First Intermark Corporation $1,000
5. Koch Industries $1,000
