= Bill Roy Jr. =

American politician

Member of the Kansas House of Representatives from the 54th district
- In office 1991–1992
- Succeeded by: Doug Mays

Member of the Kansas House of Representatives from the 53rd district
- In office 1985–1990
- Preceded by: Vic Miller
- Succeeded by: Denise Everhart

Personal details
- Born: May 11, 1954 (age 72)
- Party: Democratic
- Spouse: Juanita DeMotte Roy
- Parent: Bill Roy (father)

William R. Roy Jr. (born May 11, 1954) is an American politician who served as a Democratic member of the Kansas House of Representatives from 1985 to 1992. Roy was the son of U.S. Congressman and Senatorial candidate Bill Roy. He was elected to the 53rd district in 1984, serving from 1985 to 1990, and one additional term in the 54th district from 1991 to 1992. He resided in Topeka, Kansas.
