= Lerado, Kansas =

Unincorporated community in Reno County, Kansas

Coordinates: 37°46′35″N 98°16′57″W

Lerado is an unincorporated community in Reno County, Kansas, United States. Early residents intended to name the community for Laredo, Texas, but a clerical error by the post office resulted in the E and A being swapped.

== History ==
Lerado had a post office from 1874 until 1904, but the post office was called Netherland until 1884.

== Education ==
The community is served by Fairfield USD 310 public school district.
