= Annie Tietze =

American politician

Member of the Kansas House of Representatives from the 53rd district
- In office January 14, 2013 – June 6, 2016
- Preceded by: Ann Mah
- Succeeded by: Jim Gartner

Member of the Kansas House of Representatives from the 56th district
- In office January 8, 2007 – January 14, 2013
- Preceded by: Nancy Kirk
- Succeeded by: Virgil Weigel

Personal details
- Born: October 7, 1950 (age 75) Topeka, Kansas, U.S.
- Party: Democratic
- Spouse: Dennis Tietze
- Children: 2
- Education: Emporia State University; University of Kansas

Annie Tietze (born October 7, 1950) is a Democratic former member of the Kansas House of Representatives. She represented the 56th from 2007 to 2013 and the 53rd district from 2013 to 2016.

Tietze has worked as a Court Appointed Special Advocate and a teacher. She received her BS in Education from Emporia State University and Masters in Communication Studies at the University of Kansas.

She is the local president of the Kansas National Education Association and a member of the First Methodist Church.

== Committee membership ==
Federal and State Affairs

Commerce, Labor, and Economic Development

== Major donors ==
The top 5 donors to Tietze's 2008 campaign:

- Kansans for Lifesaving Cures $750
- Kansas Hospital Assoc $750
- Kansas Optometric Assoc $700
- Kansas Contractors Assoc $600
- Kansas Physical Therapy Assoc $600
