= Jesse Burris =

American politician

Member of the Kansas House of Representatives from the 82nd district
- In office May 31, 2017 – January 9, 2023
- Preceded by: Peter DeGraaf
- Succeeded by: Leah Howell

Personal details
- Born: January 22, 1982 (age 44)
- Party: Republican
- Spouse: Anneke
- Children: 3
- Education: Washburn University (BS, JD)

Military service
- Branch/service: United States Air Force

Jesse Burris (January 22, 1982) is an American attorney and politician who served as a member of the Kansas House of Representatives from the 82nd district. He was appointed to the House on May 31, 2017, succeeding his father-in-law, Peter DeGraaf. In 2022, Burris declined to run for re-election, and his term ended at the beginning of the legislative session on January 9, 2023. He was succeeded by Leah Howell.

== Education ==
Burris earned a Bachelor of Science degree in political science and business administration from Washburn University and a Juris Doctor from the Washburn University School of Law.

== Career ==
After graduating from law school, Burris worked as an attorney for the Secretary of State of Kansas and Kansas Department of Health and Environment. Burris was nominated to the Kansas House of Representatives and assumed office on May 31, 2017, succeeding his father-in-law, Peter DeGraaf. Burris also served in the United States Air Force.

== Personal life ==
Burris and his wife, Anneke, live in Mulvane, Kansas and have three children.
