= Jim Gartner =

American politician

Member of the Kansas House of Representatives from the 53rd district
- In office January 9, 2017 – January 9, 2023
- Preceded by: Annie Tietze
- Succeeded by: Kirk Haskins

Personal details
- Party: Democratic
- Education: Washburn University (BBA)

Military service
- Branch/service: United States Marine Corps
- Battles/wars: Vietnam War

Jim Gartner is an American politician and businessman who served as a Democratic member of the Kansas House of Representatives from the 53rd district. Elected in 2016, he assumed office on January 9, 2017, and did not run for re-election in 2022.

== Education ==
Gartner earned a Bachelor of Business Administration from Washburn University in 1974.

== Career ==
Prior to entering politics, Gartner worked as an employee of Southwestern Bell for 30 years, retiring as vice president of external affairs. He served in the United States Marine Corps for three years during the Vietnam War. Gartner also served as a member and president of the Auburn–Washburn USD 437.

In 2016, Gartner was selected by 53rd district Democratic precinct committee-members to replace Annie Tietze in a special election. Gartner was later elected to a full term in November 2016. Since 2019, he has served as a minority whip of the Kansas House of Representatives.

== Personal life ==
Gartner lives in Topeka, Kansas.
