= Blaine Finch =

American politician

Speaker pro tempore of the Kansas House of Representatives
- In office January 14, 2019 – January 9, 2023
- Preceded by: Scott Schwab
- Succeeded by: Blake Carpenter

Member of the Kansas House of Representatives from the 59th district
- In office January 14, 2013 – January 9, 2023
- Preceded by: William Prescott
- Succeeded by: Rebecca Schmoe

Personal details
- Born: February 6, 1977 (age 49) Lawrence, Kansas, U.S.
- Party: Republican
- Education: Baker University; Ottawa University (BA); Washburn University (JD)

Blaine Finch (born February 6, 1977) is an American politician who served in the Kansas House of Representatives in the 59th district from 2013 to 2023.

Kansas House of Representatives
Preceded by Scott Schwab	Speaker pro tempore of the Kansas House of Representatives; 2019–2023	Succeeded by Blake Carpenter
