= Elaine Wells =

American politician

Member of the Kansas House of Representatives from the 59th district
- In office 1991–1994
- Preceded by: Denise Everhart
- Succeeded by: Joe Humerickhouse

Member of the Kansas House of Representatives from the 13th district
- In office 1987–1990
- Succeeded by: Rochelle Chronister

Personal details
- Born: May 26, 1951 (age 75)
- Party: Democrat until May 16, 1989; Republican thereafter

Elaine L. Wells (born May 26, 1951) is an American politician who served as a member of the Kansas House of Representatives from 1987 to 1994. A resident of Carbondale, Kansas, she represented the 13th and 59th House districts. Wells was initially elected as a Democrat, but changed parties to become a Republican on May 16, 1989.
