= Dixie Toelkes =

American politician

Member of the Kansas House of Representatives from the 53rd district
- In office 1995–2002
- Preceded by: Denise Everhart
- Succeeded by: Roger Toelkes

Personal details
- Born: Dixie Hummer; August 4, 1935 Topeka, Kansas
- Died: June 30, 2015 Topeka, Kansas
- Party: Democratic
- Spouse: Roger Toelkes (m. Nov. 27, 1954)
- Children: 2
- Education: Kansas State University (Master's degree)

Dixie E. Toelkes (August 4, 1935–June 30, 2015) was an American politician who served as a Democratic member of the Kansas House of Representatives from 1995 to 2002. She represented the 53rd District and lived in Topeka, Kansas.

Toelkes worked as a special education teacher. She was first elected in 1994 and took office in 1995. She served until 2002, when health problems led to her retirement; her husband, Roger, was appointed to fill her seat and was re-elected to one term in his own right.
