= Joe Humerickhouse =

American politician (born 1940)

Member of the Kansas House of Representatives from the 59th district
- In office 1995–2008
- Preceded by: Elaine Wells
- Succeeded by: William Prescott

Personal details
- Born: April 14, 1940 (age 86) Topeka, Kansas
- Party: Republican
- Spouse: Thelma K. Humerickhouse

Joe D. Humerickhouse (born April 14, 1940) is an American politician who served in the Kansas House of Representatives as a Republican from the 59th district from 1995 to 2008. He lived in Osage City, Kansas during his time in the legislature.
