= William Prescott (Kansas politician) =

American politician

Member of the Kansas House of Representatives from the 59th district
- In office January 12, 2009 – January 14, 2013
- Preceded by: Joe Humerickhouse
- Succeeded by: Blaine Finch

Personal details
- Born: October 24, 1954 (age 71) Harveyville, Kansas, U.S.
- Party: Republican
- Spouse: Daresa

William Prescott (October 24, 1954) is a former member of the Kansas House of Representatives who served the 59th district from 2009 to 2013.

== House service ==
In 2011-2013, Prescott served on the committees for Agricultural & Natural Resources, Interstate Cooperation, Taxation, and Transportation. For 2009-2010, he served on the committees for Commerce & Labor, Higher Education, and Agriculture & Natural Resources.

== Elections ==
Prescott was defeated in the 2012 Republican primary for District 76 by Peggy Mast.

== Issue positions ==
Prescott's answers to the Kansas State Legislative Election 2008 Political Courage Test are available.

In the test he said his legislative priorities were "To develop an energy policy for Kansas, To demand full funding of PILT payments from the federal government for federally owned lands, To control property taxes, personal income tax, and to see that the tax dollars are spent efficiently."
