= Kansas State Department of Education =

Administrative agency of Kansas

- Leadership and Support Through Student Learning

State education agency overview
- Formed: January 14, 1969
- Preceding State education agency: Kansas Superintendent of Public Instruction
- Jurisdiction: State of Kansas
- Headquarters: 900 SW Jackson St, Topeka, KS 66612; Topeka, Kansas; 39.046012°N 95.674697°W
- State education agency executive: Dr. Randy Watson, Commissioner of Education
- Parent department: State of Kansas
- Website: KSDE Website

The Kansas State Department of Education (KSDE) is a state agency responsible for administration of the state's K-12 education system. It is governed by a ten-member board, the State Board of Education, which appoints the Commissioner of Education. The Board helps determine educational policy for the state's primary and secondary schools.

== Kansas State Board of Education ==
Under the original Kansas Constitution adopted in 1859, the Superintendent of Public Instruction was established as a partisan elected office, with responsibility for overseeing the state's public school system. In 1966, Kansas voters ratified a constitutional amendment that eliminated the elected Superintendent, replacing the position with a ten-member elected Board of Education with responsibility for appointing the Commissioner. The ten districts are drawn every ten years by combining four adjoining State Senate districts.

District	Name	Party	Start	Next Election
1	Danny Zeck	Republican	January 3, 2023	2026 (retiring)
2	Melanie Haas	Democratic	January 12, 2021	2028
3	Michelle Dombrosky	Republican	January 1, 2019	2026 (retiring)
4	Connie O'Brien	Republican	January 13, 2025	2028
5	Cathy Hopkins	Republican	January 3, 2023	2026 (retiring)
6	Beryl New	Democratic	January 13, 2025	2028
7	Dennis Hershberger	Republican	January 3, 2023	2026 (retiring)
8	Betty Arnold	Democratic	January 12, 2021	2028
9	Jim Porter	Republican	January 2015	2026 (retiring)
10	Debby Potter	Republican	January 13, 2025	2028

== Intelligent design controversies ==
In 1999, the Board voted to eliminate most references to evolution, the age of the Earth, and the origin of the universe from the state's science standards and to remove these topics from the state's standardized tests. The Board relied heavily on material from the Creation Science Association of Mid America in constructing science standards that minimized the teaching of evolution. The Board was awarded the Ig Nobel Prize for the new rules. However, after the 2000 elections altered the composition of the Board, it reversed its 1999 decision, instead requiring instruction on all those topics and restoring them to standardized tests.

A shift after the 2004 election restored a conservative majority on the Board, which voted to adopt new science standards, effective in 2007, that mandated equal time for the theories of evolution and "intelligent design." The decision was condemned by Democratic Governor Kathleen Sebelius, who argued, "If we're going to bring high-tech jobs to Kansas and move our state forward, we need to strengthen science standards, not weaken them." Finally, following yet another shift at the 2006 election, which elected a moderate majority, the Board reversed the decision and restored the state's original science-based standards.

== See also ==
- List of Ig Nobel Prize winners
