= Abbyville, Kansas =

City in Reno County, Kansas

- City
- Location within Reno County and Kansas

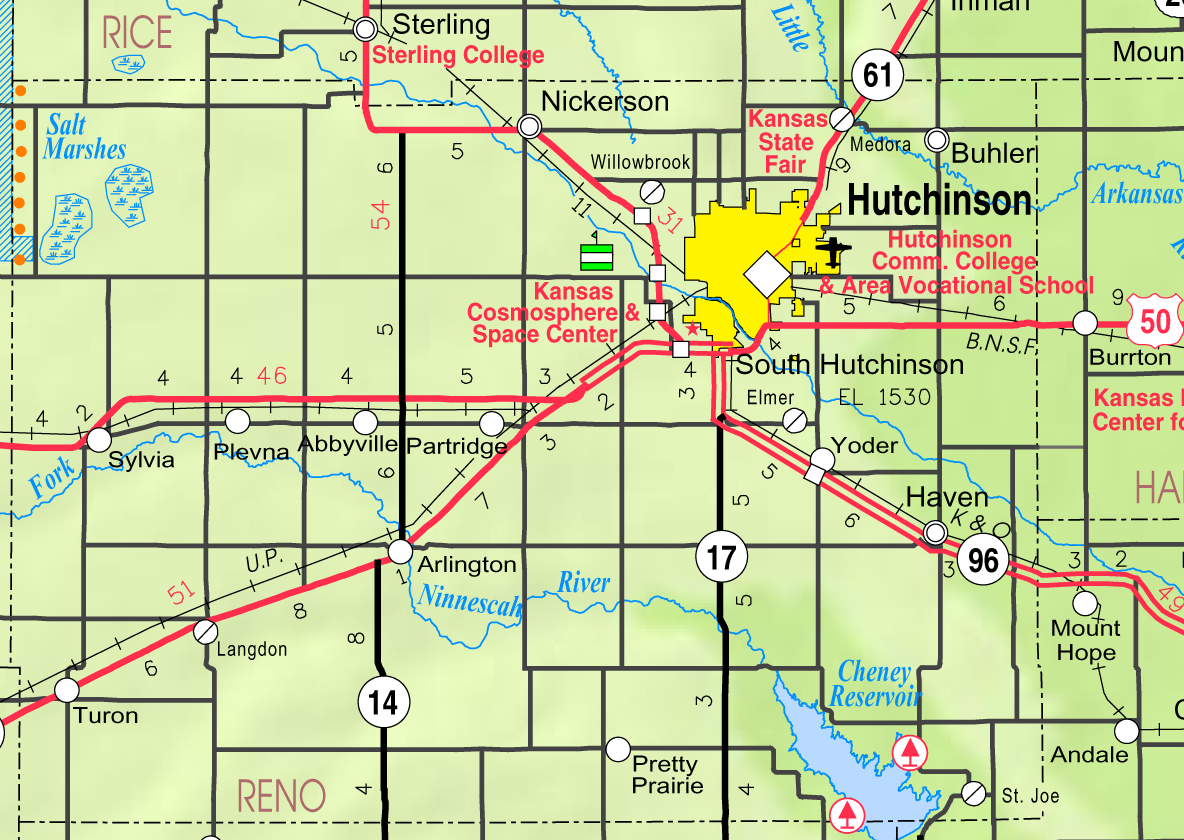
- KDOT map of Reno County (legend)
- Coordinates: 37°58′14″N 98°12′11″W
- Country: United States
- State: Kansas
- County: Reno
- Founded: 1880s
- Incorporated: 1924
- Named for: Abby McLean

Area
  - Total: 0.27 sq mi (0.69 km^{2})
  - Land: 0.27 sq mi (0.69 km^{2})
  - Water: 0 sq mi (0.00 km^{2})
- Elevation: 1,650 ft (500 m)

Population (2020)
  - Total: 83
  - Density: 310/sq mi (120/km^{2})
- Time zone: UTC-6 (CST)
  - Summer (DST): UTC-5 (CDT)
- ZIP Code: 67510
- Area code: 620
- FIPS code: 20-00100
- GNIS ID: 2393875

Abbyville is a city in Reno County, Kansas, United States. As of the 2020 census, the population of the city was 83.

== History ==
Abbyville was a station on the Atchison, Topeka and Santa Fe Railway. The community was named for Abby McLean, the first baby born there; its previous name was Nonpariel.

The first post office in Abbyville was established in 1886 after it was moved from Salt Creek (an extinct town).

== Geography ==
According to the United States Census Bureau, the city has a total area of 0.19 square miles (0.49 km^{2}), all land.

=== Climate ===
The climate in this area is characterized by hot, humid summers and generally mild to cool winters. According to the Köppen Climate Classification system, Abbyville has a humid subtropical climate, abbreviated "Cfa" on climate maps.

== Demographics ==
Historical population
Census	Pop.	Note	%±
1930	147		—
1940	138		−6.1%
1950	99		−28.3%
1960	118		19.2%
1970	143		21.2%
1980	123		−14.0%
1990	140		13.8%
2000	128		−8.6%
2010	87		−32.0%
2020	83		−4.6%
U.S. Decennial Census

=== 2020 census ===
The 2020 United States census counted 83 people, 42 households, and 32 families in Abbyville. The population density was 309.7 per square mile (119.6/km^{2}). There were 49 housing units at an average density of 182.8 per square mile (70.6/km^{2}). The racial makeup was 95.18% (79) white or European American (93.98% non-Hispanic white), 0.0% (0) black or African-American, 1.2% (1) Native American or Alaska Native, 0.0% (0) Asian, 0.0% (0) Pacific Islander or Native Hawaiian, 2.41% (2) from other races, and 1.2% (1) from two or more races. Hispanic or Latino of any race was 2.41% (2) of the population.

Of the 42 households, 26.2% had children under the age of 18; 61.9% were married couples living together; 16.7% had a female householder with no spouse or partner present. 21.4% of households consisted of individuals and 4.8% had someone living alone who was 65 years of age or older. The average household size was 1.8 and the average family size was 2.2. The percent of those with a bachelor's degree or higher was estimated to be 8.4% of the population.

9.6% of the population was under the age of 18, 6.0% from 18 to 24, 16.9% from 25 to 44, 27.7% from 45 to 64, and 39.8% who were 65 years of age or older. The median age was 61.3 years. For every 100 females, there were 97.6 males. For every 100 females ages 18 and older, there were 92.3 males.

The 2016–2020 5-year American Community Survey estimates show that the median family income was $69,375 (+/- $21,896). Males had a median income of $35,625 (+/- $13,202) versus $38,438 (+/- $22,108) for females. The median income for those above 16 years old was $37,500 (+/- $14,030).

=== 2010 census ===
As of the census of 2010, there were 87 people, 42 households, and 29 families residing in the city. The population density was 457.9 inhabitants per square mile (176.8/km^{2}). There were 47 housing units at an average density of 247.4 per square mile (95.5/km^{2}). The racial makeup of the city was 96.6% White, 1.1% Native American, and 2.3% from two or more races. Hispanic or Latino people of any race were 1.1% of the population.

There were 42 households, of which 28.6% had children under the age of 18 living with them, 61.9% were married couples living together, 7.1% had a female householder with no husband present, and 31.0% were non-families. 28.6% of all households were made up of individuals, and 9.6% had someone living alone who was 65 years of age or older. The average household size was 2.07 and the average family size was 2.52.

The median age in the city was 53.5 years. 19.5% of residents were under the age of 18; 4.5% were between the ages of 18 and 24; 12.6% were from 25 to 44; 40.2% were from 45 to 64, and 23% were 65 years of age or older. The gender makeup of the city was 54.0% male and 46.0% female.

== Arts and culture ==
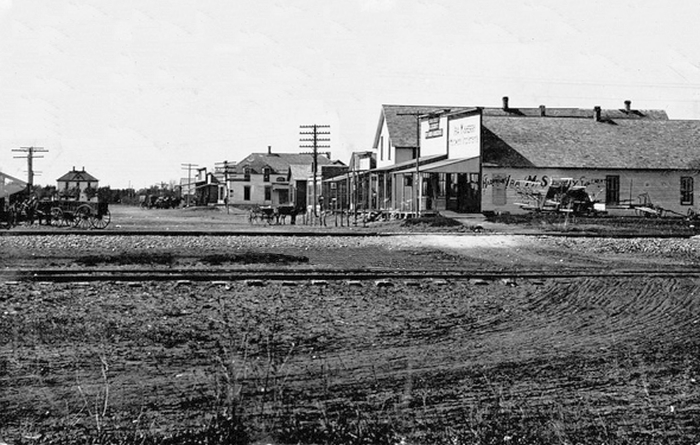
Abbyville, 1909

=== Rodeo ===
Abbyville hosts the annual Abbyville Frontier Days PRCA Rodeo and BBQ the third weekend of May. Current events of the rodeo include barrel racing, mutton bustin', bull riding, calf roping, steer wrestling, and other special events. It is now a PRCA sanctioned event.

Clifford "Pinky" Busick was the creator of this rodeo, starting with a loan of $10 from his father. The first rodeo was a celebration of the Kansas Centennial, and it was held on July 15, 1961. The events at this initial celebration included a bonnet contest, beard contest, antique display, horse show, carnival, and bean dinner. Oklahoma! was performed in the evening as the main entertainment. The event was such a great success for Abbyville that Pinky worked to continue the rodeo as an annual event.

The second rodeo was held on the third weekend of May in 1963, and it has continued yearly ever since. Locals, both from Abbyville and from nearby towns, ran every aspect of the rodeo and took great pride in it. Many traditions of the early rodeos still continue today, including a Saturday morning parade, ham and chicken noodle lunch, and a BBQ dinner with fresh pie for dessert. Two 5- or 6-year-old children are crowned "Miss Little Britches" and "Uncle Sam" in the parade.

Despite Abbyville being such a small town, the rodeo has continued to this day, and it has kept Abbyville on the map.

Hollerado filmed the official music video for their single "Good Day at the Races" at the Abbyville rodeo grounds.

== Education ==
The community is served by Fairfield USD 310 public school district. Before the creation of USD 310, the old Abbyville High School mascot was the Lions.
