= Turon, Kansas =

City in Reno County, Kansas

- City
- Location within Reno County and Kansas

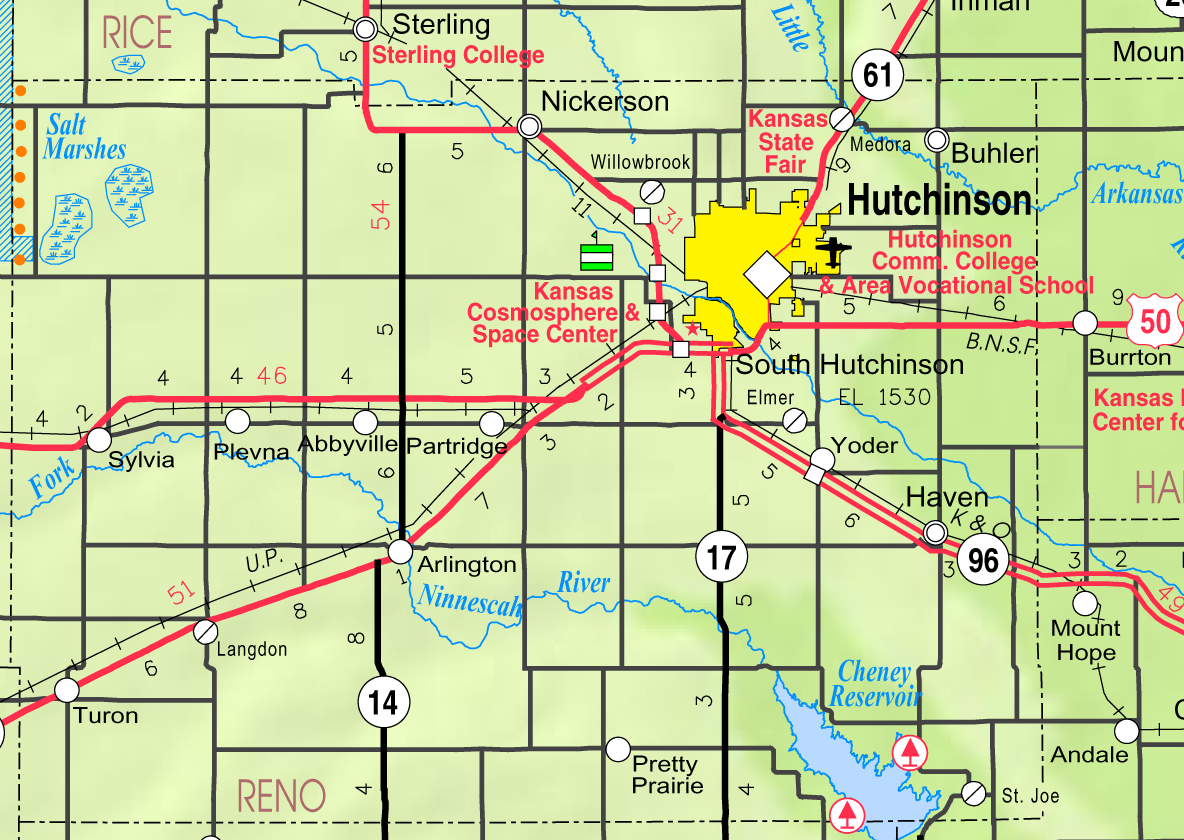
- KDOT map of Reno County (legend)
- Coordinates: 37°48′27″N 98°25′40″W
- Country: United States
- State: Kansas
- County: Reno
- Founded: 1886
- Incorporated: 1905

Area
  - Total: 0.44 sq mi (1.15 km^{2})
  - Land: 0.44 sq mi (1.15 km^{2})
  - Water: 0 sq mi (0.00 km^{2})
- Elevation: 1,765 ft (538 m)

Population (2020)
  - Total: 309
  - Density: 696/sq mi (269/km^{2})
- Time zone: UTC-6 (CST)
  - Summer (DST): UTC-5 (CDT)
- ZIP Code: 67583
- Area code: 620
- FIPS code: 20-71800
- GNIS ID: 2397069

Turon is a city in Reno County, Kansas, United States. As of the 2020 census, the population of the city was 309.

== History ==
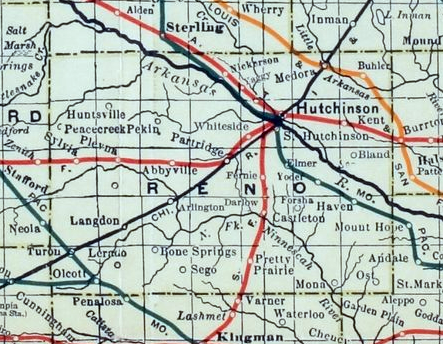
1915 railroad map of Reno County

Turon was founded in 1886. It was incorporated as a city in 1905.

In 1887, the Chicago, Kansas and Nebraska Railway built a main line from Herington through Turon to Pratt. In 1888, this line was extended to Liberal. Later, it was extended to Tucumcari, New Mexico and El Paso, Texas. It foreclosed in 1891 and taken over by Chicago, Rock Island and Pacific Railway, which shut down in 1980 and reorganized as Oklahoma, Kansas and Texas Railroad, merged in 1988 with Missouri Pacific Railroad, merged in 1997 with Union Pacific Railroad. Most locals still refer to this railroad as the "Rock Island".

== Geography ==
According to the United States Census Bureau, the city has a total area of 0.46 square miles (1.19 km^{2}), all land.

=== Climate ===
The climate in this area is characterized by hot, humid summers and generally mild to cool winters. According to the Köppen Climate Classification system, Turon has a humid subtropical climate, abbreviated "Cfa" on climate maps.

== Demographics ==
Historical population
Census	Pop.	Note	%±
1910	572		—
1920	631		10.3%
1930	576		−8.7%
1940	594		3.1%
1950	632		6.4%
1960	559		−11.6%
1970	430		−23.1%
1980	481		11.9%
1990	393		−18.3%
2000	436		10.9%
2010	387		−11.2%
2020	309		−20.2%
U.S. Decennial Census

=== 2010 census ===
As of the census of 2010, there were 387 people, 159 households, and 98 families residing in the city. The population density was 841.3 inhabitants per square mile (324.8/km^{2}). There were 210 housing units at an average density of 456.5 per square mile (176.3/km^{2}). The racial makeup of the city was 84.5% White, 4.1% Native American, 7.5% from other races, and 3.9% from two or more races. Hispanic or Latino people of any race were 12.4% of the population.

There were 159 households, of which 31.4% had children under the age of 18 living with them, 48.4% were married couples living together, 11.3% had a female householder with no husband present, 1.9% had a male householder with no wife present, and 38.4% were non-families. 34.6% of all households were made up of individuals, and 18.2% had someone living alone who was 65 years of age or older. The average household size was 2.43 and the average family size was 3.11.

The median age in the city was 39.6 years. 26.1% of residents were under the age of 18; 10.1% were between the ages of 18 and 24; 20% were from 25 to 44; 26.1% were from 45 to 64; and 17.8% were 65 years of age or older. The gender makeup of the city was 46.3% male and 53.7% female.

=== 2000 census ===
As of the census of 2000, there were 436 people, 177 households, and 115 families residing in the city. The population density was 950.4 inhabitants per square mile (367.0/km^{2}). There were 218 housing units at an average density of 475.2 per square mile (183.5/km^{2}). The racial makeup of the city was 92.43% White, 0.46% African American, 0.69% Native American, 4.36% from other races, and 2.06% from two or more races. Hispanic or Latino people of any race were 7.34% of the population.

There were 177 households, out of which 30.5% had children under the age of 18 living with them, 54.8% were married couples living together, 9.0% had a female householder with no husband present, and 34.5% were non-families. 30.5% of all households were made up of individuals, and 18.6% had someone living alone who was 65 years of age or older. The average household size was 2.46 and the average family size was 3.11.

In the city, the population was spread out, with 28.7% under the age of 18, 7.8% from 18 to 24, 22.2% from 25 to 44, 20.6% from 45 to 64, and 20.6% who were 65 years of age or older. The median age was 38 years. For every 100 females, there were 92.9 males. For every 100 females age 18 and over, there were 85.1 males.

The median income for a household in the city was $21,429, and the median income for a family was $26,000. Males had a median income of $21,750 versus $19,500 for females. The per capita income for the city was $11,197. About 14.7% of families and 19.3% of the population were below the poverty line, including 30.2% of those under age 18 and 9.2% of those age 65 or over.

== Education ==
The community is served by Fairfield USD 310 public school district. Before the creation of USD 310, the old Turon High School mascot was the Eagles.
