= Ann Mah =

American politician

Member of the Kansas House of Representatives from the 53rd district
- In office January 10, 2005 – January 14, 2013
- Preceded by: Roger Toelkes
- Succeeded by: Annie Tietze

Personal details
- Born: May 5, 1951 (age 75) Clay Center, Kansas, U.S.
- Party: Democratic
- Spouse: Larry K. Mah
- Education: Emporia State University

Ann Mah (May 5, 1951) was a Democratic member of the Kansas House of Representatives, representing the 53rd district. She served between 2005 and 2013. She was elected to the Kansas State Board of Education in November, 2016, representing District 4.

Mah also worked as a trainer and speaker, and is the owner of Discover Strategies. Previously she worked as an Area Manager for SBC and a teacher in Emporia and Chase County Public Schools.

She is a member of the Capitol Area Federated Women's Democratic Club, Shawnee County Democrats, and the American Business Women's Association. She is president of the Lutheran Fine Arts Council of Topeka. Mah formerly served on the State Committee of the North Central Association, on the board of directors of the United Way of Greater Topeka, and on the Shawnee Heights Public Schools Foundation Board of Directors.

Mah received her Bachelor of Science and Master of Science in Education from Emporia State University.

== Issue positions ==
Mah had planned bills for a number of her legislative priorities, including Unilateral annexation, KPERS retiree income limits, Immigration reform, and Tax credit for college tuition.

== Committee membership ==
- Education
- Higher Education (Ranking Member)
- Local Government

== Major donors ==
The top five donors to Mah's 2008 campaign:

1. Kansas Contractors Association: $1,000
2. AT&T: $1,000
3. Kansans for Lifesaving Cures: $1,000
4. Pioneer Communications: $1,000
5. Kansas Assoc of Realtors: $900

== See also ==
- 2020 Kansas elections
