= Langdon, Kansas =

City in Reno County, Kansas

- City
- Location within Reno County and Kansas

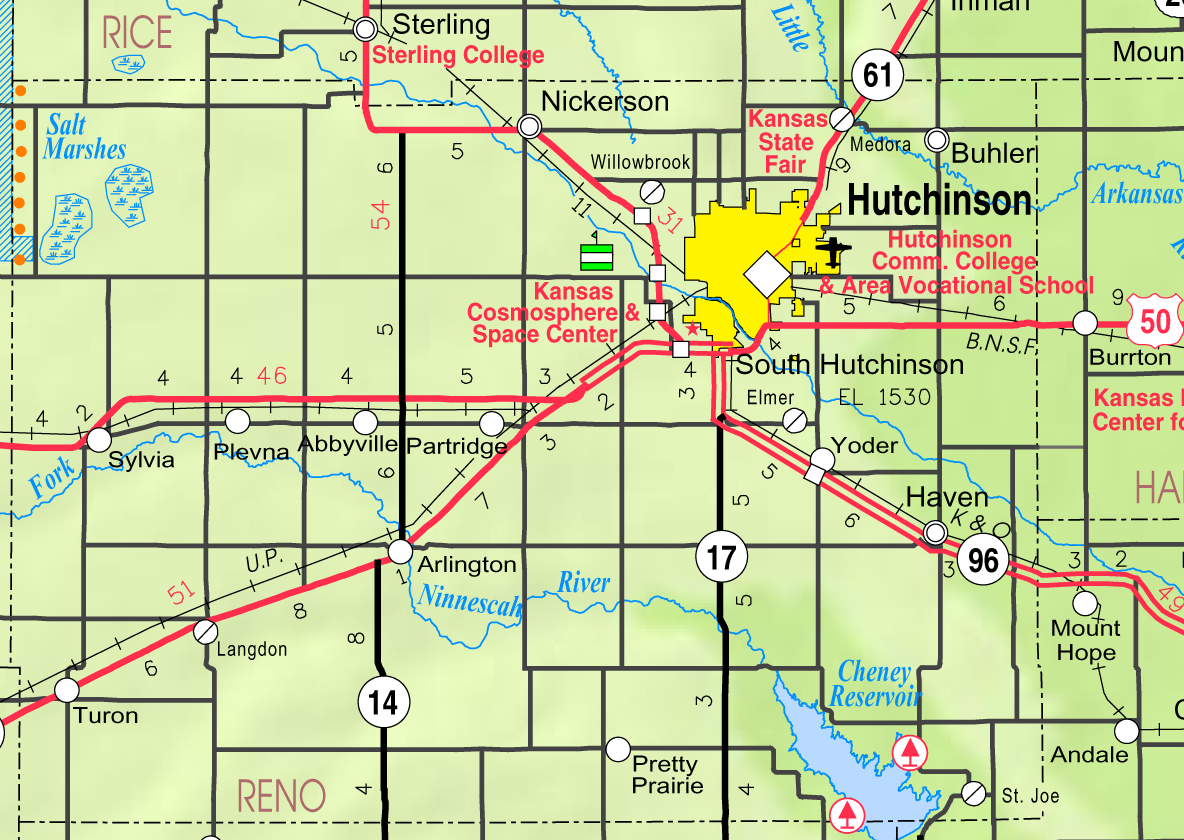
- KDOT map of Reno County (legend)
- Coordinates: 37°51′12″N 98°19′27″W
- Country: United States
- State: Kansas
- County: Reno
- Founded: 1870s
- Incorporated: 1912

Area
  - Total: 0.10 sq mi (0.26 km^{2})
  - Land: 0.10 sq mi (0.26 km^{2})
  - Water: 0 sq mi (0.00 km^{2})
- Elevation: 1,690 ft (520 m)

Population (2020)
  - Total: 39
  - Density: 390/sq mi (150/km^{2})
- Time zone: UTC-6 (CST)
  - Summer (DST): UTC-5 (CDT)
- ZIP Code: 67583
- Area code: 620
- FIPS code: 20-38500
- GNIS ID: 2395630

Langdon is a city in Reno County, Kansas, United States. As of the 2020 census, the population of the city was 39.

== History ==
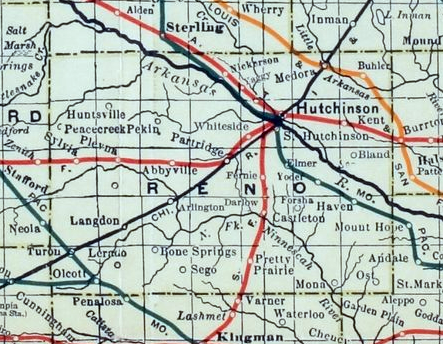
1915 railroad map of Reno County

The first post office in Langdon was established in 1873. Langdon was named for a local businessman.

In 1887, the Chicago, Kansas and Nebraska Railway built a main line from Herington through Langdon to Pratt. In 1888, this line was extended to Liberal. Later, it was extended to Tucumcari, New Mexico and El Paso, Texas. It foreclosed in 1891 and taken over by Chicago, Rock Island and Pacific Railway, which shut down in 1980 and reorganized as Oklahoma, Kansas and Texas Railroad, merged in 1988 with Missouri Pacific Railroad, merged in 1997 with Union Pacific Railroad. Most locals still refer to this railroad as the "Rock Island".

== Geography ==
According to the United States Census Bureau, the city has a total area of 0.12 square miles (0.31 km^{2}), all land.

== Demographics ==
Historical population
| Census | Pop. | Note | %± |
|---|---|---|---|
| 1920 | 204 | | — |
| 1930 | 181 | | −11.3% |
| 1940 | 208 | | 14.9% |
| 1950 | 128 | | −38.5% |
| 1960 | 97 | | −24.2% |
| 1970 | 93 | | −4.1% |
| 1980 | 84 | | −9.7% |
| 1990 | 62 | | −26.2% |
| 2000 | 72 | | 16.1% |
| 2010 | 42 | | −41.7% |
| 2020 | 39 | | −7.1% |
U.S. Decennial Census

=== 2020 census ===
The 2020 United States census counted 39 people, 6 households, and 5 families in Langdon. The population density was 393.9 per square mile (152.1/km^{2}). There were 19 housing units at an average density of 191.9 per square mile (74.1/km^{2}). The racial makeup was 71.79% (28) white or European American (71.79% non-Hispanic white), 0.0% (0) black or African-American, 15.38% (6) Native American or Alaska Native, 0.0% (0) Asian, 0.0% (0) Pacific Islander or Native Hawaiian, 0.0% (0) from other races, and 12.82% (5) from two or more races. Hispanic or Latino of any race was 2.56% (1) of the population.

Of the 6 households, 66.7% had children under the age of 18; 66.7% were married couples living together; 16.7% had a female householder with no spouse or partner present. 0.0% of households consisted of individuals and 0.0% had someone living alone who was 65 years of age or older. The average household size was 1.5 and the average family size was 2.4.

17.9% of the population was under the age of 18, 5.1% from 18 to 24, 35.9% from 25 to 44, 28.2% from 45 to 64, and 12.8% who were 65 years of age or older. The median age was 39.8 years. For every 100 females, there were 129.4 males. For every 100 females ages 18 and older, there were 146.2 males.

The 2016–2020 5-year American Community Survey estimates show that the median household income was $41,750 (with a margin of error of +/- $10,768).

=== 2010 census ===
As of the census of 2010, there were 42 people, 20 households, and 11 families residing in the city. The population density was 350.0 inhabitants per square mile (135.1/km^{2}). There were 35 housing units at an average density of 291.7 per square mile (112.6/km^{2}). The racial makeup of the city was 95.2% White and 4.8% Native American.

There were 20 households, of which 20.0% had children under the age of 18 living with them, 45.0% were married couples living together, 5.0% had a female householder with no husband present, 5.0% had a male householder with no wife present, and 45.0% were non-families. 40.0% of all households were made up of individuals, and 25% had someone living alone who was 65 years of age or older. The average household size was 2.10 and the average family size was 2.91.

The median age in the city was 50.3 years. 14.3% of residents were under the age of 18; 9.6% were between the ages of 18 and 24; 12% were from 25 to 44; 42.8% were from 45 to 64; and 21.4% were 65 years of age or older. The gender makeup of the city was 52.4% male and 47.6% female.

== Education ==
The community is served by Fairfield USD 310 public school district, which is located about 1 mile north of the city. Before the creation of USD 310, the old Langdon High School mascot was the Owls.
