= Plevna, Kansas =

City in Reno County, Kansas

- City
- Location within Reno County and Kansas

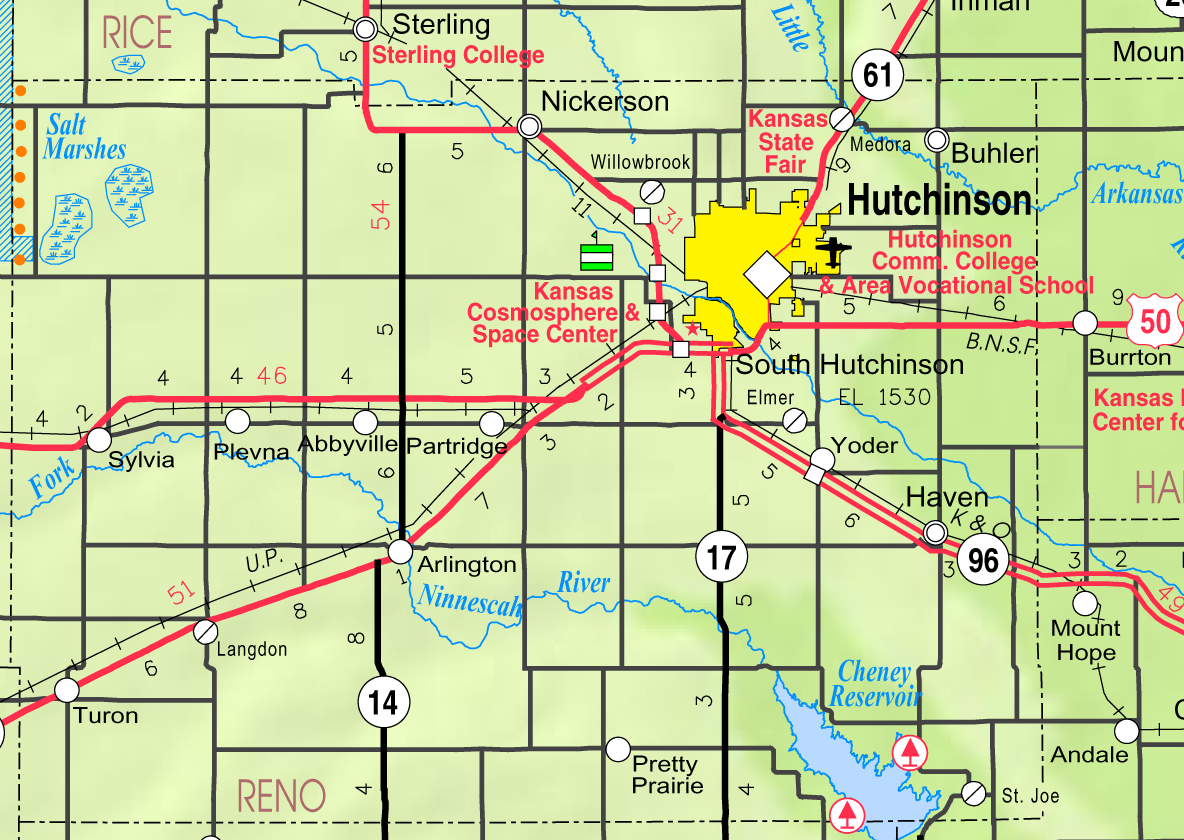
- KDOT map of Reno County (legend)
- Coordinates: 37°58′18″N 98°18′35″W
- Country: United States
- State: Kansas
- County: Reno
- Township: Plevna
- Founded: 1870s
- Incorporated: 1910
- Named for: Pleven, Bulgaria

Government
  - Mayor: Chance Hand

Area
  - Total: 0.22 sq mi (0.58 km^{2})
  - Land: 0.22 sq mi (0.58 km^{2})
  - Water: 0 sq mi (0.00 km^{2})
- Elevation: 1,686 ft (514 m)

Population (2020)
  - Total: 85
  - Density: 380/sq mi (150/km^{2})
- Time zone: UTC-6 (CST)
  - Summer (DST): UTC-5 (CDT)
- ZIP Code: 67568
- Area code: 620
- FIPS code: 20-56725
- GNIS ID: 2396238

Plevna is a city in Reno County, Kansas, United States. As of the 2020 census, the population of the city was 85.

== History ==
The first post office in Plevna was established in October 1877.

It is named after the historical city of Pleven in Bulgaria, which months before was a siege battle won by Russian/Bulgarian forces, gaining Bulgaria its independence.

=== 2025 tornado ===
On the night of May 18, 2025, an EF3 tornado hit the city. It flipped mobile homes and damaged some houses, buildings and vehicles that were in the city. Many residents took shelter in a church basement as the tornado hit.

== Geography ==
According to the United States Census Bureau, the city has a total area of 0.23 square miles (0.60 km^{2}), all land.

== Demographics ==
Historical population
Census	Pop.	Note	%±
1920	202		—
1930	174		−13.9%
1940	161		−7.5%
1950	200		24.2%
1960	117		−41.5%
1970	124		6.0%
1980	115		−7.3%
1990	117		1.7%
2000	99		−15.4%
2010	98		−1.0%
2020	85		−13.3%
U.S. Decennial Census

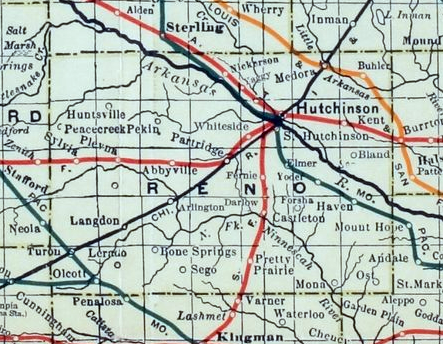
1915 railroad map of Reno County

=== 2020 census ===
The 2020 United States census counted 85 people, 37 households, and 18 families in Plevna. The population density was 377.8 per square mile (145.9/km^{2}). There were 47 housing units at an average density of 208.9 per square mile (80.7/km^{2}). The racial makeup was 90.59% (77) white or European American (90.59% non-Hispanic white), 1.18% (1) black or African-American, 0.0% (0) Native American or Alaska Native, 0.0% (0) Asian, 0.0% (0) Pacific Islander or Native Hawaiian, 2.35% (2) from other races, and 5.88% (5) from two or more races. Hispanic or Latino of any race was 2.35% (2) of the population.

Of the 37 households, 27.0% had children under the age of 18; 43.2% were married couples living together; 18.9% had a female householder with no spouse or partner present. 45.9% of households consisted of individuals and 27.0% had someone living alone who was 65 years of age or older. The average household size was 2.2 and the average family size was 3.3. The percent of those with a bachelor's degree or higher was estimated to be 10.6% of the population.

24.7% of the population was under the age of 18, 3.5% from 18 to 24, 23.5% from 25 to 44, 24.7% from 45 to 64, and 23.5% who were 65 years of age or older. The median age was 43.5 years. For every 100 females, there were 93.2 males. For every 100 females ages 18 and older, there were 82.9 males.

The 2016–2020 5-year American Community Survey estimates show that the median household income was $23,750 (with a margin of error of +/- $9,260) and the median family income was $41,250 (+/- $33,704). Females had a median income of $24,375 (+/- $6,319). The median income for those above 16 years old was $17,083 (+/- $5,519). Approximately, 26.7% of families and 26.4% of the population were below the poverty line, including 44.0% of those under the age of 18 and 15.4% of those ages 65 or over.

=== 2010 census ===
As of the census of 2010, there were 98 people, 43 households, and 29 families residing in the city. The population density was 426.1 inhabitants per square mile (164.5/km^{2}). There were 50 housing units at an average density of 217.4 per square mile (83.9/km^{2}). The racial makeup of the city was 91.8% White, 1.0% Native American, 5.1% from other races, and 2.0% from two or more races. Hispanic or Latino people of any race were 6.1% of the population.

There were 43 households, of which 23.3% had children under the age of 18 living with them, 39.5% were married couples living together, 18.6% had a female householder with no husband present, 9.3% had a male householder with no wife present, and 32.6% were non-families. 32.6% of all households were made up of individuals, and 13.9% had someone living alone who was 65 years of age or older. The average household size was 2.28 and the average family size was 2.83.

The median age in the city was 47 years. 25.5% of residents were under the age of 18; 4% were between the ages of 18 and 24; 19.4% were from 25 to 44; 28.6% were from 45 to 64; and 22.4% were 65 years of age or older. The gender makeup of the city was 43.9% male and 56.1% female.

== Education ==
The community is served by Fairfield USD 310 public school district. Before the creation of USD 310, the old Plevna High School mascot was the Tigers.

== Notable people ==
- Karl C. King, member of U.S. House of Representatives from Pennsylvania

== See also ==
- Ninnescah River
