= National Register of Historic Places listings in Pratt County, Kansas =

Location of Pratt County in Kansas

This is a list of the National Register of Historic Places listings in Pratt County, Kansas. It is intended to be a complete list of the properties and districts on the National Register of Historic Places in Pratt County, Kansas, United States. The locations of National Register properties and districts for which the latitude and longitude coordinates are included below, may be seen in an online map.

There are 9 properties and districts listed on the National Register in the county, and one former listing

This National Park Service list is complete through NPS recent listings posted December 12, 2025.

== Current listings ==
	Name on the Register	Image	Date listed	Location	City or town	Description
2	S.P. Gebhart House	S.P. Gebhart House	February 12, 1987 (#87000074)	105 N. Iuka St. 37°38′47″N 98°44′30″W	Pratt	
3	Hotel Roberts	Hotel Roberts	January 7, 2015 (#14001122)	120 W. 4th St. 37°38′34″N 98°44′24″W	Pratt	
4	Norden Bombsight Storage Vaults		September 25, 2012 (#12000816)	305 Flint Rd. 37°42′14″N 98°44′33″W	Pratt	Norden bombsight is part of the World War II-Era Aviation-Related Facilities of Kansas MPS
5	Parachute Building		April 22, 2009 (#09000231)	40131 Barker Ave. 37°42′15″N 98°44′27″W	Pratt	
6	Pratt Archeological Site		April 13, 1972 (#72000522)	Address restricted	Pratt	
7	J.R. Rice Barn and Granary		June 9, 1995 (#95000695)	North of U.S. Route 54, northwest of Cullison; 37°38′17″N 98°56′32″W	Cullison	
8	J.R. Rice Farmstead		January 7, 2000 (#99001649)	NE4, SE4, SE4, NE4, 3-28-15; 37°38′20″N 98°56′31″W	Cullison	
9	Sawyer City Jail		July 21, 2022 (#100007924)	Alley west of Main St. 37°29′53″N 98°41′04″W	Sawyer	
10	Thornton Adobe Barn		December 10, 2003 (#03001258)	1 mile (1.6 km) east and 1.25 miles (2.01 km) north of Isabel; 37°29′16″N 98°32′15″W	Isabel	Modest dairy barn built from adobe and reused corrugated metal in 1942, under materials shortages of World War II.

== Former listings ==
	Name on the Register	Image	Date listed	Date removed	Location	City or town	Description
1	Earl H. Ellis VFW Post No. 1362	Earl H. Ellis VFW Post No. 1362	July 12, 2006 (#06000597)	November 26, 2026	701 E. 1st St. 37°38′45″N 98°43′53″W	Pratt	Art Deco-style Veterans of Foreign Wars post built in 1939.

== See also ==
- List of National Historic Landmarks in Kansas
- National Register of Historic Places listings in Kansas
