= Skyline High School (Kansas) =

Location
- 20269 West Highway 54; Pratt, Kansas 67124; United States
- Coordinates: 37.639581°N 98.784286°W

Information
- School type: Public, High School
- Established: 1966
- School board: Board Website
- School district: Skyline USD 438
- CEEB code: 172477
- Grades: 9-12
- Enrollment: 94 (2023-2024)
- Color
- Mascot: Thunderbird
- Website: School website

Skyline School is a public secondary school located two miles west of Pratt, Kansas, serving students in grades K-12. The school is operated by Skyline USD 438 school district. Skyline High School is one of two high schools serving the city of Pratt. The school colors are Columbia blue and white, although you may see Deep Sky blue or Navy blue alongside Columbia blue, and the school mascot is the Thunderbird.

Skyline High School is a member of the Kansas State High School Activities Association and offers a variety of sports programs. Athletic teams compete in the 2A division in the Heart of the Plains League and are known as the "Thunderbirds". Extracurricular activities are also offered in the form of performing arts, school publications, and clubs.

== History ==
The Kansas Legislature in 1963 passed the Unification Law requiring each county to form a planning unit for consolidation, including establishment of district boundaries, and to present that plan to the state superintendent of instruction for approval, with plans to be voted on in special local elections and unified districts consolidated and operational by 1966. The legislature mandated an anticipated enrollment of at least 400 students in grades K-12. The planning unit in Pratt County was led by Bob Moore of Byers. The Pratt County schools ultimately consolidated into Skyline included Byers, Coats, Cullison, and Sawyer. For the first five years of Skyline's existence, Sawyer continued to educate students in grades Kindergarten through six. Iuka was originally included in consolidation plans, but later voted to send its students to Pratt High School since Iuka had its own grade school at the time.

The school was named "Skyline" after the Skyline League in which the consolidated schools had played. The school colors of Columbia blue and white were chosen so as not to match the school colors of any consolidated school. The "Thunderbird" mascot was chosen in homage to the United States Air Force Academy, whose colors were also blue and white.

Skyline's location was chosen to be centrally located for the consolidated schools, but also to be close enough to the city of Pratt to be useful to the city should the consolidated school fail. The 40 acres that Skyline occupies were obtained by eminent domain. The original school building was designed by architects Schaefer, Schirmer & Eflin of Wichita. The planning unit visited other schools the firm had designed, including Coleman Middle School in Wichita, Circle High School in Towanda, KS, and Chaparral High School in Anthony, KS. The original building was constructed by Dondlinger Construction of Wichita, KS, with a budget of $738,324 for construction and $99,977 for equipment. Students were bused in from the consolidated towns as well as local farms. In 1973, a shop and bus maintenance barn were added to the original structure. In 1978 a second practice gymnasium was added. In 1985, classrooms were added to the west of the library. In 1990, a technology building was added to the campus, and classrooms were added to the original structure. In 2022, an extension was planned to be built, and started being built in 2023 on the east side, including but not limited to, new locker rooms, a proper tornado shelter, and more classrooms, the extension is planned to be finished by 2023.

Skyline High School has graduated nearly 1,500 students and is one of two high schools in Pratt County, Kansas, along with Pratt High School.

== See also ==
- List of high schools in Kansas
- List of unified school districts in Kansas
