= Naron, Kansas =

Former town located in Pratt County, Kansas

Naron
- Former town
- Location in Kansas
- Coordinates: 37°47′35″N 98°53′09″W
- Country: United States
- State: Kansas
- County: Pratt County
- Founded: 1878
- Founded by: Levi Holloway Naron

Population
  - Total: 45

Naron was a town located in Pratt County, Kansas, near present-day Byers, Kansas. The town was started in 1878 by Levi Holloway Naron who had moved there from Mississippi where he spied for the Union in the Civil War.

A post office was located in Naron from 1881 to 1907.

The town had a population of 45 in 1910; it was disorganized around 1970.
