= Preston, Kansas =

City in Pratt County, Kansas

- City
- Location within Pratt County and Kansas

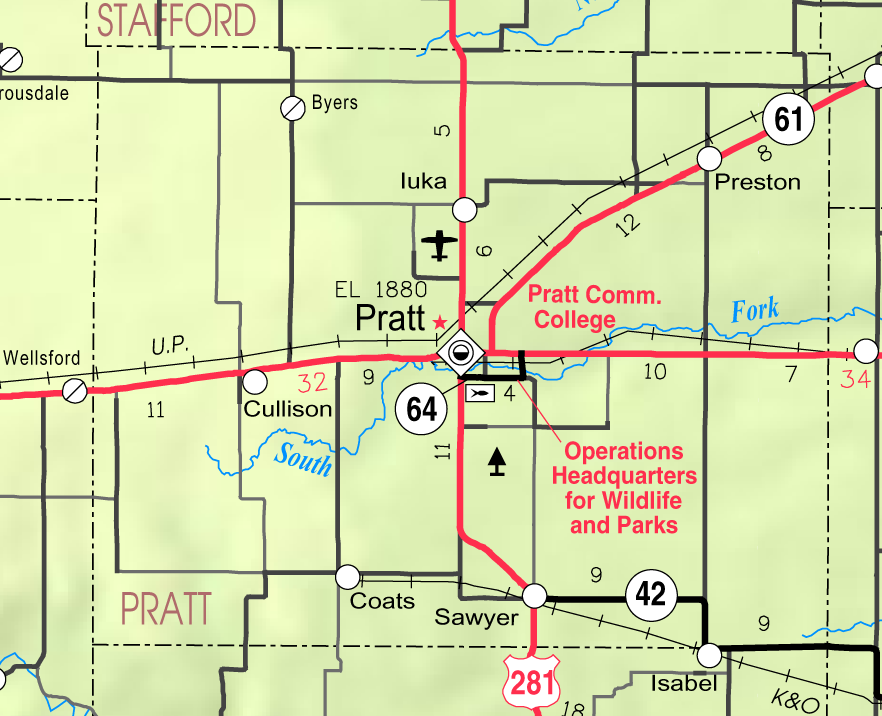
- KDOT map of Pratt County (legend)
- Coordinates: 37°45′30″N 98°33′28″W
- Country: United States
- State: Kansas
- County: Pratt
- Founded: 1887
- Incorporated: 1909

Area
  - Total: 0.44 sq mi (1.13 km^{2})
  - Land: 0.44 sq mi (1.13 km^{2})
  - Water: 0 sq mi (0.00 km^{2})
- Elevation: 1,834 ft (559 m)

Population (2020)
  - Total: 115
  - Density: 264/sq mi (102/km^{2})
- Time zone: UTC-6 (CST)
  - Summer (DST): UTC-5 (CDT)
- Area code: 620
- FIPS code: 20-57675
- GNIS ID: 2396274
- Website: www.prestonks.com

Preston is a city in Pratt County, Kansas, United States. As of the 2020 census, the population of the city was 115.

== History ==
=== 19th century ===
In 1887, the Chicago, Kansas and Nebraska Railway built a main line from Herington through Preston to Pratt. In 1888, this line was extended to Liberal. Later, it was extended to Tucumcari, New Mexico and El Paso, Texas. It foreclosed in 1891 and taken over by Chicago, Rock Island and Pacific Railway, which shut down in 1980 and reorganized as Oklahoma, Kansas and Texas Railroad, merged in 1988 with Missouri Pacific Railroad, merged in 1997 with Union Pacific Railroad. Most locals still refer to this railroad as the "Rock Island".

Preston was founded in 1887. Preston had a post office from 1887 until 1990.

=== Redevelopment ===
Although the city had been considered to be dying, it is being revitalized. An Arizona undertaker has announced to build a crematorium in the city, helping to revive business there. A mortuary is currently open; and during 2011 a fabric store, a used car lot, a diner, and a convenience store are scheduled to open.

== Geography ==
According to the United States Census Bureau, the city has a total area of 0.47 square miles (1.22 km^{2}), all land.

== Demographics ==
Historical population
Census	Pop.	Note	%±
1910	278		—
1920	401		44.2%
1930	383		−4.5%
1940	328		−14.4%
1950	307		−6.4%
1960	278		−9.4%
1970	239		−14.0%
1980	227		−5.0%
1990	177		−22.0%
2000	164		−7.3%
2010	158		−3.7%
2020	115		−27.2%
U.S. Decennial Census

=== 2020 census ===
The 2020 United States census counted 115 people, 58 households, and 29 families in Preston. The population density was 264.4 per square mile (102.1/km^{2}). There were 78 housing units at an average density of 179.3 per square mile (69.2/km^{2}). The racial makeup was 81.74% (94) white or European American (80.87% non-Hispanic white), 0.0% (0) black or African-American, 0.0% (0) Native American or Alaska Native, 0.0% (0) Asian, 0.0% (0) Pacific Islander or Native Hawaiian, 6.09% (7) from other races, and 12.17% (14) from two or more races. Hispanic or Latino of any race was 11.3% (13) of the population.

Of the 58 households, 24.1% had children under the age of 18; 29.3% were married couples living together; 20.7% had a female householder with no spouse or partner present. 37.9% of households consisted of individuals and 17.2% had someone living alone who was 65 years of age or older. The average household size was 2.0 and the average family size was 2.8. The percent of those with a bachelor's degree or higher was estimated to be 14.8% of the population.

20.0% of the population was under the age of 18, 7.0% from 18 to 24, 18.3% from 25 to 44, 33.0% from 45 to 64, and 21.7% who were 65 years of age or older. The median age was 52.5 years. For every 100 females, there were 76.9 males. For every 100 females ages 18 and older, there were 67.3 males.

The 2016–2020 5-year American Community Survey estimates show that the median household income was $24,583 (with a margin of error of +/- $10,817). Males had a median income of $31,500 (+/- $7,894) versus $25,556 (+/- $13,600) for females. The median income for those above 16 years old was $28,000 (+/- $5,372). Approximately, 17.9% of families and 30.3% of the population were below the poverty line, including 5.4% of those under the age of 18 and 37.0% of those ages 65 or over.

=== 2010 census ===
As of the census of 2010, there were 158 people, 67 households, and 43 families residing in the city. The population density was 336.2 inhabitants per square mile (129.8/km^{2}). There were 82 housing units at an average density of 174.5 per square mile (67.4/km^{2}). The racial makeup of the city was 98.1% White, 1.3% African American, and 0.6% Native American.

There were 67 households, of which 26.9% had children under the age of 18 living with them, 44.8% were married couples living together, 13.4% had a female householder with no husband present, 6.0% had a male householder with no wife present, and 35.8% were non-families. 29.9% of all households were made up of individuals, and 13.4% had someone living alone who was 65 years of age or older. The average household size was 2.36 and the average family size was 2.95.

The median age in the city was 40.5 years. 25.9% of residents were under the age of 18; 7.6% were between the ages of 18 and 24; 18.3% were from 25 to 44; 32.3% were from 45 to 64; and 15.8% were 65 years of age or older. The gender makeup of the city was 49.4% male and 50.6% female.

== Education ==
The community is served by Pratt USD 382 public school district.

Preston High School was closed through school unification. The Preston High School mascot was Wildcats.
