= Travis Theis =

American gridiron football player (born 2001)

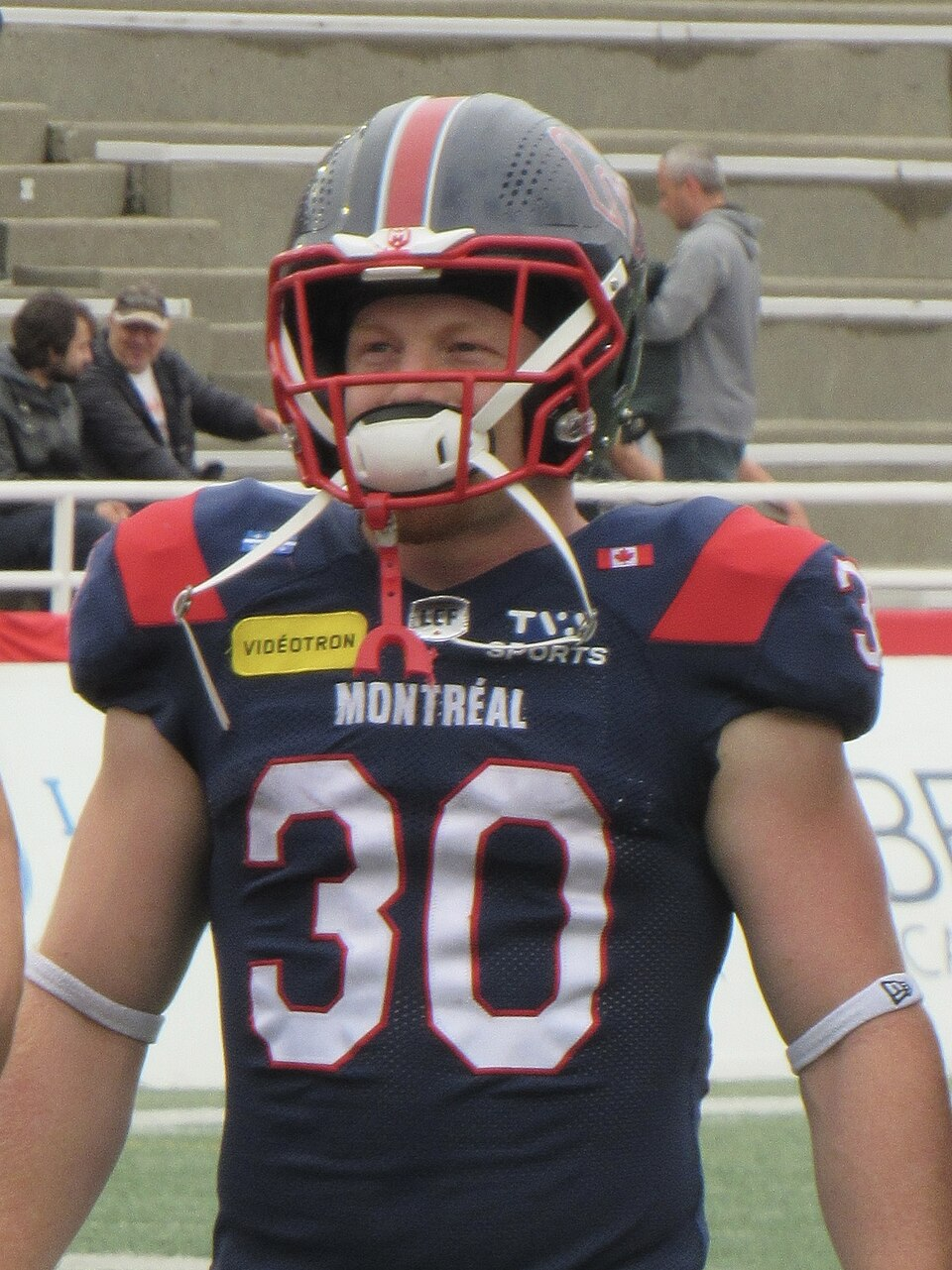
- Theis with the Montreal Alouettes in 2025

No. 30 – Montreal Alouettes
- Position: Running back
- Roster status: Active
- CFL status: American

Personal information
- Born: January 8, 2001 (age 25); Pratt, Kansas, U.S.
- Listed height: 5 ft 10 in (1.78 m)
- Listed weight: 215 lb (98 kg)

Career information
- High school: Pratt
- College: South Dakota (2019–2024)
- NFL draft: 2025: undrafted

Career history
- Montreal Alouettes (2025–present)

Awards and highlights
- CFL West All-Star (2026); First-team All-MVFC (2024); Second-team All-MVFC (2023)
- Stats at CFL.ca

Travis Theis (born January 8, 2001) is an American professional football running back for the Montreal Alouettes of the Canadian Football League (CFL). He played college football for South Dakota.

== Early life ==
Theis attended Pratt High School in Pratt, Kansas. He played as a quarterback in his freshman and senior years and was a running back his sophomore and junior years. His high school team, the Greenbacks of Pratt High, won a 4-A state championship in 2016 and were the runner-up in 2018.

During his high school career he was Kansas All-Classes Offensive Player of the Year, an All-State honoree for three seasons, and was a four-time All-League Honoree. He rushed 841 times for 6,744 yards and 101 touchdowns with an average of 8 yards per carry. His senior year in 2018 he ran for 2,608 yards on 230 attempts and 43 touchdowns averaging 11.3 yards per carry.

== College career ==
Theis played for South Dakota as a running back. During his college career with the Coyotes, Theis played 56 games, rushed for 3,666 yards, and scored 40 rushing touchdowns from 2019 to 2024. He also recorded 915 career receiving yards and 2 touchdowns on 111 total career receptions. Theis earned First-Team All-MVFC and 2nd Team All-American honors in 2024 after rushing for 1,172 yards and scoring 19 touchdowns.

== Professional career ==
Pre-draft measurables
Height	Weight
5 ft 9 3/4 in (1.77 m)	215 lb (98 kg)
Values from Pro Day

Theis went undrafted during the 2025 NFL draft. He attended the Denver Broncos rookie minicamp, but did not sign.

Theis signed with the Montreal Alouettes on May 19, 2025. He made the team's active roster following training camp and played in his first professional game on June 6, 2025, against the Toronto Argonauts where he had three carries for 22 yards and one catch for ten yards. He later scored his first touchdown on an 80-yard punt return on August 8, 2025, against the Edmonton Elks.
