= Gebhart =

Gebhart is a surname. Notable people with the surname include:

- Charles Frederick Gebhart (1891–1942), American actor
- Émile Gebhart (1839–1908), French academic and writer
- Timo Gebhart (born 1989), German footballer
- Thomas Gebhart (born 1971), German politician

== See also ==
- Gebhart factor, radiative heat transfer
- Gebhart Tavern, museum in Miamisburg, Ohio
- Gebhart v. Belton, American justice case
- S.P. Gebhart House, US historic house in Pratt, Kansas
