= Hopewell, Pratt County, Kansas =

Unincorporated community in Pratt County, Kansas

Hopewell, Kansas
- Unincorporated community
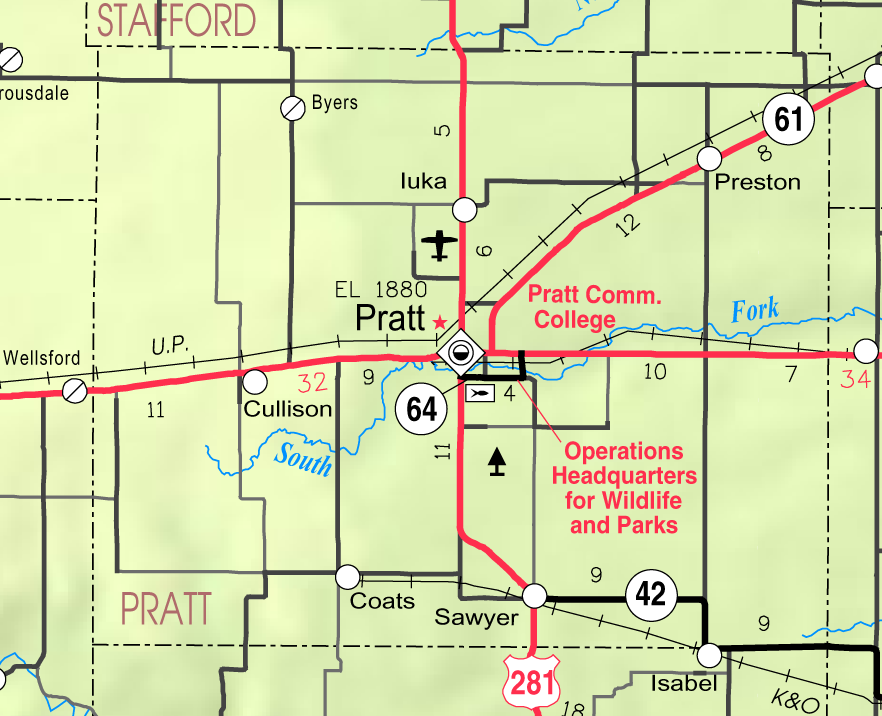
- KDOT map of Pratt County (legend)

- Location within Kansas Location within the United States
- Coordinates: 37°48′17″N 98°59′44″W
- Country: United States
- State: Kansas
- County: Pratt
- Time zone: UTC-6 (CST)
  - Summer (DST): UTC-5 (CDT)

Hopewell is an unincorporated community in Pratt County, Kansas, United States. It is located in the Rattlesnake Creek valley, roughly 18 miles northwest of Pratt at NW 140th Ave and NW 110th St.

== History ==
A post office was opened in Hopewell in 1904 and closed in 1908. A post office under name Fravel then opened in Hopewell in 1916, was renamed Hopewell in 1921 and remained in operation until it was discontinued in 1973. From 1908-1916 and since the post office's final closure in 1973, mail to Hopewell has been routed via nearby Macksville.

== Geography ==
Hopewell lies at an elevation of 2044 feet (624 m).

== Education ==
The community is served by Macksville USD 351 public school district.
