= Natrona, Kansas =

Unincorporated community in Pratt County, Kansas

- Unincorporated community
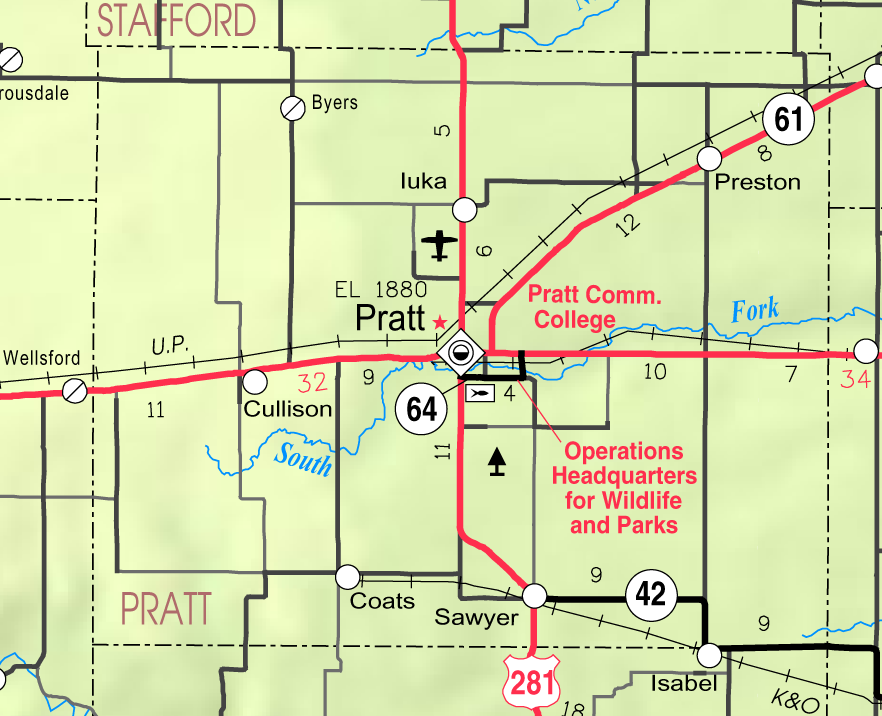
- KDOT map of Pratt County (legend)

- Location within Kansas Location within the United States
- Coordinates: 37°42′43″N 98°39′53″W
- Country: United States
- State: Kansas
- County: Pratt
- Time zone: UTC-6 (CST)
  - Summer (DST): UTC-5 (CDT)

Natrona is an unincorporated community in Pratt County, Kansas, United States. It is located six miles northeast of Pratt along NE 40th Ave on the north side of K-61.

== History ==
German-speaking Lutheran settlers hailing from Saxony began settling in northeastern Pratt County in the 1870s, moving south from around Ellsworth after their crops were eaten by birds. The town of Natrona was platted in 1887, and the life of the local German-speaking community centered around St. Paul's Lutheran Church located in the town after its construction in 1901. The original one-room church was moved and a new brick church, which continues to operate in the 21st century, built on its former site. The town had a population of 25 in 1910 and is located along the Chicago, Rock Island, and Pacific Railroad.

Natrona briefly had a post office, from 1888 until 1890. Natrona was briefly renamed Olympia in 1903 and the post office was reinstated under that name but the Olympia post office closed permanently in 1914 and the town's name reverted to Natrona.

== Education ==
The community is served by Pratt USD 382 public school district.
