= Croft, Kansas =

Unincorporated community in Pratt County, Kansas

- Unincorporated community
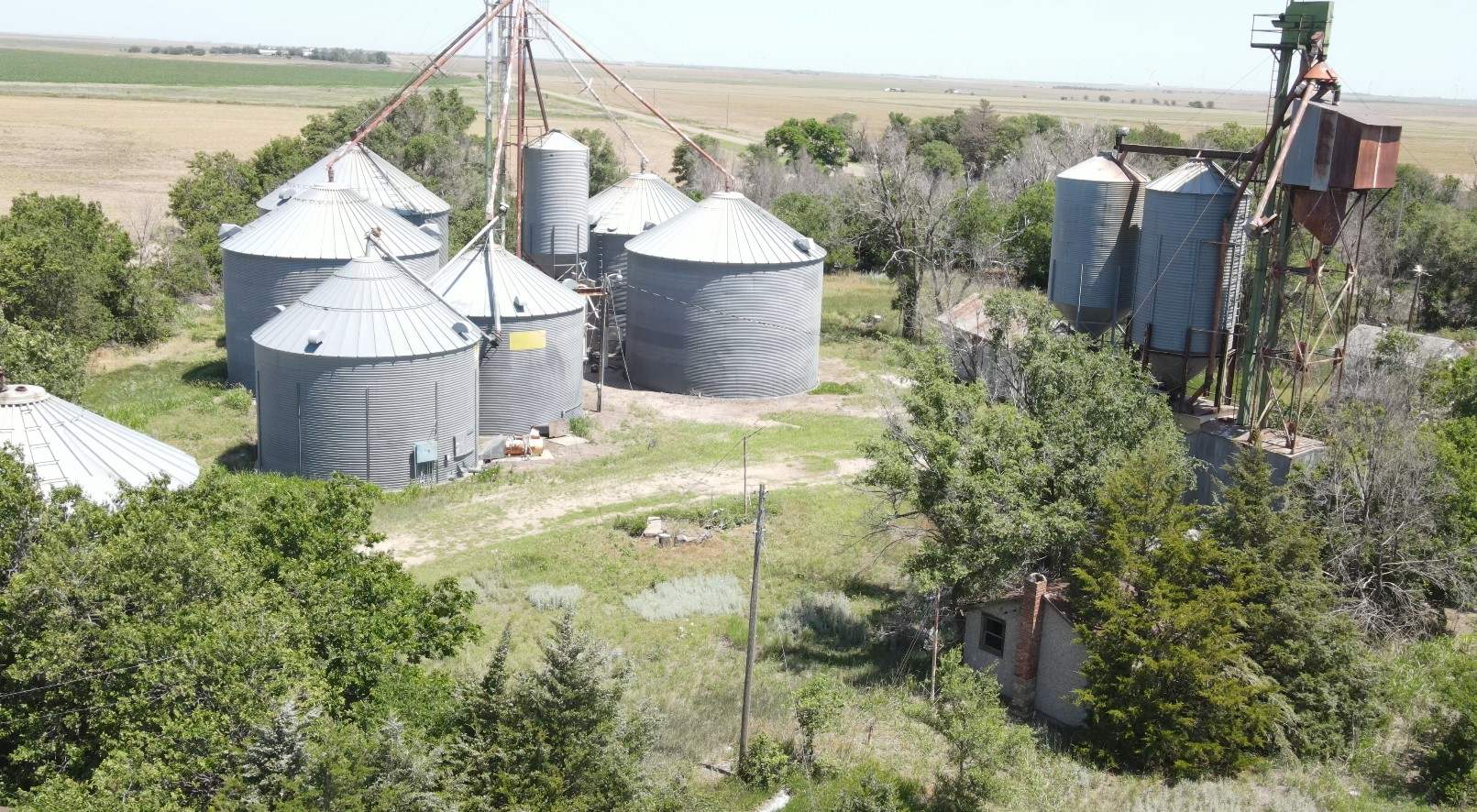
- Skyview of grain bins in Croft (2024)

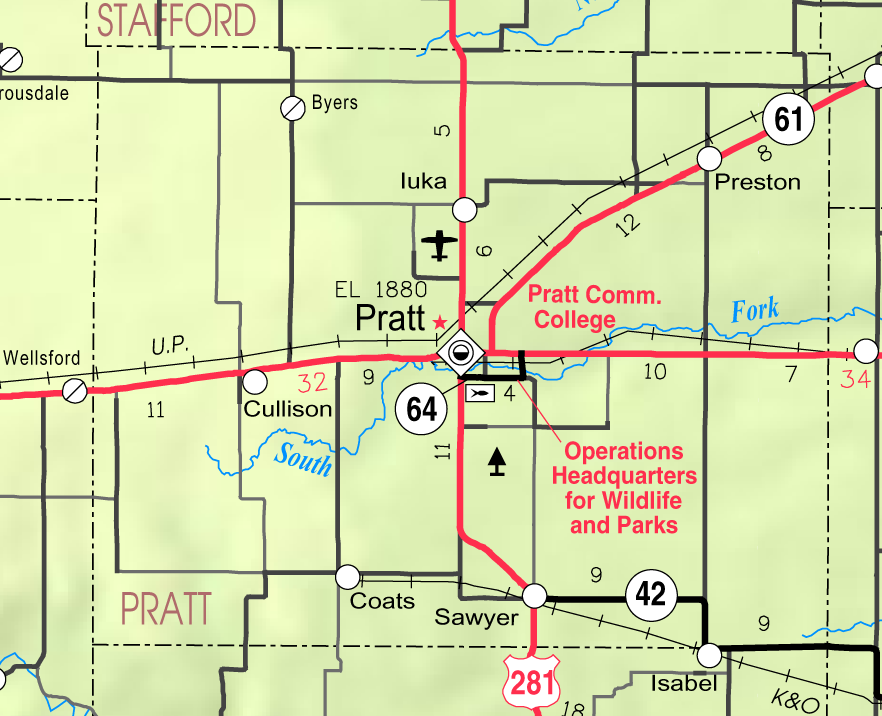
- KDOT map of Pratt County (legend)

- Location within Kansas Location within the United States
- Coordinates: 37°30′12″N 98°59′41″W
- Country: United States
- State: Kansas
- County: Pratt
- Time zone: UTC-6 (CST)
  - Summer (DST): UTC-5 (CDT)

Croft is an unincorporated community in Township 10, Pratt County, Kansas, United States. It is located approximately 20 miles (32 km) southwest of Pratt, along SW 140th Ave between SW 90th St and SW 100th St.

== History ==
Croft reported a population of 30 in 1910 and was located in the now-defunct Springvale Township of Pratt County, Kansas. It formerly hosted a station on the Wichita & Englewood division of the Atchison, Topeka & Santa Fe railroad. It had telephone connections, local trade, did some shipping and in 1910, reported a population of 30. A post office was opened in Croft in 1907, and remained in operation until it was discontinued in 1961.

The town's grain elevator closed in the early 1990s, and the town's last resident died in 2024.

== Education ==
The community is served by Skyline USD 438 public school district.

== Transportation ==
The Atchison, Topeka and Santa Fe Railway formerly provided passenger rail service to Croft on a line between Wichita and Englewood. Dedicated passenger service was provided until at least 1958, while mixed trains continued until at least 1961. As of 2025, the nearest passenger rail station is located in Dodge City, where Amtrak's Southwest Chief stops once daily on a route from Chicago to Los Angeles.
