= Cairo, Kansas =

Unincorporated community in Pratt County, Kansas

- Unincorporated community
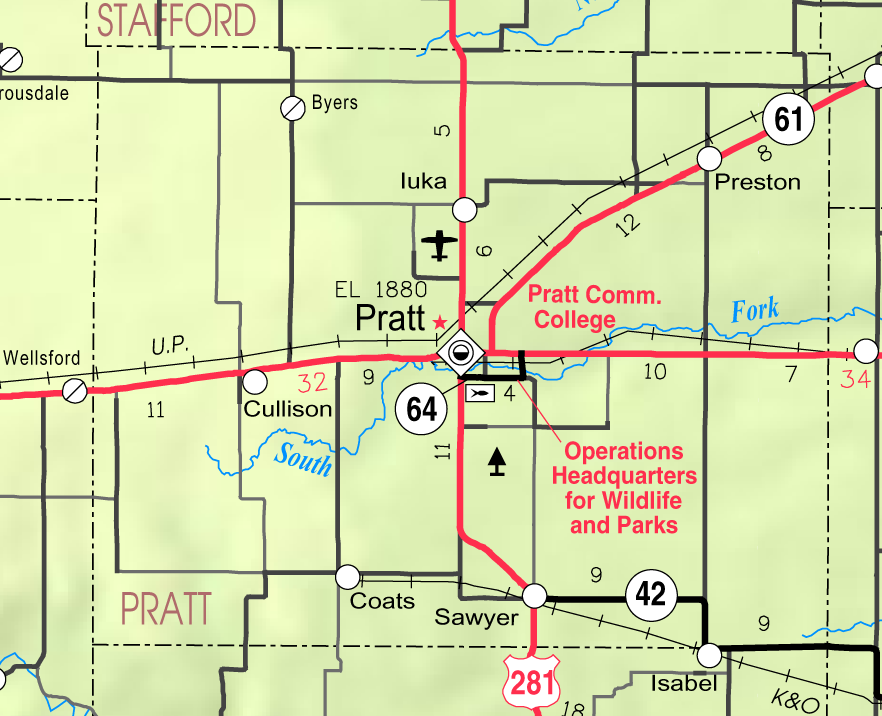
- KDOT map of Pratt County (legend)

- Location within Kansas Location within the United States
- Coordinates: 37°39′00″N 98°33′16″W
- Country: United States
- State: Kansas
- County: Pratt
- Time zone: UTC-6 (CST)
  - Summer (DST): UTC-5 (CDT)

Cairo is an unincorporated community in Pratt County, Kansas, United States. It is located between the cities of Pratt and Cunningham, roughly 11 miles east of Pratt.

== History ==
Cairo had a post office from 1887 until 1922. In 1910, the town's population was 30, and it had a station on the Wichita & Pratt division of the Atchison, Topeka, and Santa Fe Railroad. The town functioned as a shipment point for the surrounding countryside.

== Education ==
The community is served by Pratt USD 382 public school district.

== Transportation ==
The Atchison, Topeka and Santa Fe Railway formerly provided passenger rail service to Cairo on a line between Wichita and Pratt. Dedicated passenger service was provided until at least 1926, while mixed trains continued until at least 1961. As of 2025, the nearest passenger rail station is located in Hutchinson, where Amtrak's Southwest Chief stops once daily on a route from Chicago to Los Angeles.
