= KQZQ =

- Kiowa, Kansas; United States
- Broadcast area: Kiowa-Pratt, Kansas
- Frequency: 98.3 MHz
- Branding: Thunder Country 98.3

Programming
- Format: Country

Ownership
- Owner: My Town Media, Inc.

Technical information
- Licensing authority: FCC
- Facility ID: 164275
- Class: C1
- ERP: 97,000 watts
- HAAT: 208.9 meters (685 ft)
- Transmitter coordinates: 37°24′9″N 98°34′51″W

Links
- Public license information: Public file; LMS
- Webcast: Listen live
- Website: mytown-media.com/stations/my-country-98-3-kqzq-fm

KQZQ (98.3 FM) is a radio station licensed to serve the community of Kiowa, Kansas. The station is owned by My Town Media, Inc. It airs a country music format.

The station was assigned the KQZQ call letters by the Federal Communications Commission on February 27, 2008.
