= Caleb S. Pratt =

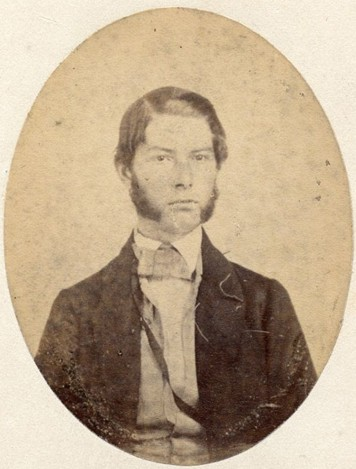
- Photograph by Black, Boston, Mass.
- Born: c. 1832
- Died: August 10, 1861
- Military career
- Allegiance: United States; Union
- Branch: Union Army: United States Army
- Service years: 1861
- Rank: Second Lieutenant
- Unit: Company D Kansas 1st Infantry Regiment
- Battles: Battle of Wilson's Creek

Caleb S. Pratt was a person involved in Bleeding Kansas. He testified before the Committee of Elections regarding the Troubles in Kansas, 1856 specific to voting irregularities in the Election of March 30, 1855 Lawrence, Kansas.

On August 10, 1861, he was killed at the Battle of Wilson's Creek.

Pratt County, Kansas, and the town of Pratt, Kansas, are named in his honor.

== Biography ==
Caleb S. Pratt was born about 1832, Boston, Suffolk, Massachusetts. He arrived in Lawrence Kansas in 1853 and engaged in the real estate business. From 1858 until his death he held the office of county clerk. He also served as city clerk for several years. Captain Frank B. Swift, James C. Horton, Edward D. Thompson, and Caleb S. Pratt, led a large company from Lawrence to the Bickerton farm, where "Old Sacramento" - a cannon captured by Colonel Doniphan at the battle of Sacramento, brought by the Border-Ruffians into Kansas, and from them captured by the Free-State men-was buried. They dug up this cannon and carried it to Lawrence, where it was fired all night in honor of the admission of Kansas.

Mr. Pratt was a member of the second New England Emigrant Aid Company party that left from Boston in 1854 as an anti-slavery immigration to the new territory.

He was a founding member of the Stubbs, a militia company that was organized on April 16, 1855, to protect Lawrence and the people of Kansas Territory.

On the breaking out of the Civil War, he was clerk of Douglas County, Kansas, and also clerk of Kansas City, Kansas.

On February 9, 1861, Caleb S. Pratt, county clerk of Douglas county, administered the oath of office to the state's first governor.

On June 3, 1861, he enlisted and was Commissioned Second Lieutenant of Company D of Kansas 1st Infantry Regiment.

On August 10, 1861, he was killed in action at Wilson's Creek, Greene County, Missouri.
