= Pratt Senior High School =

High school in Pratt, Kansas, USA

Coordinates: 37.6424°N 98.7426°W

Pratt Senior High School is a high school in Pratt, Kansas. It is in a "remote town" setting. German immigrants settled in the area. It is in Pratt USD 382.

In 1995, when the team went undefeated, and in 2016, its football team won state championships.

In 2024 enrollment in grades 9–12 was 325. The student body was about 80 percent white and 16 percent hispanic.

"Once A Greenback, Always A Greenback" is the school motto. The football team plays in the 3A division.

The old Pratt High School building was home to Pratt County College until 1968. A new high school building was constructed in 2012. The old high school building is now used for pre-achoolers and school district administrators.

== Alumni ==
- Travis Theis, running back in the Canadian Football League
