= Coats, Kansas =

City in Pratt County, Kansas

- City
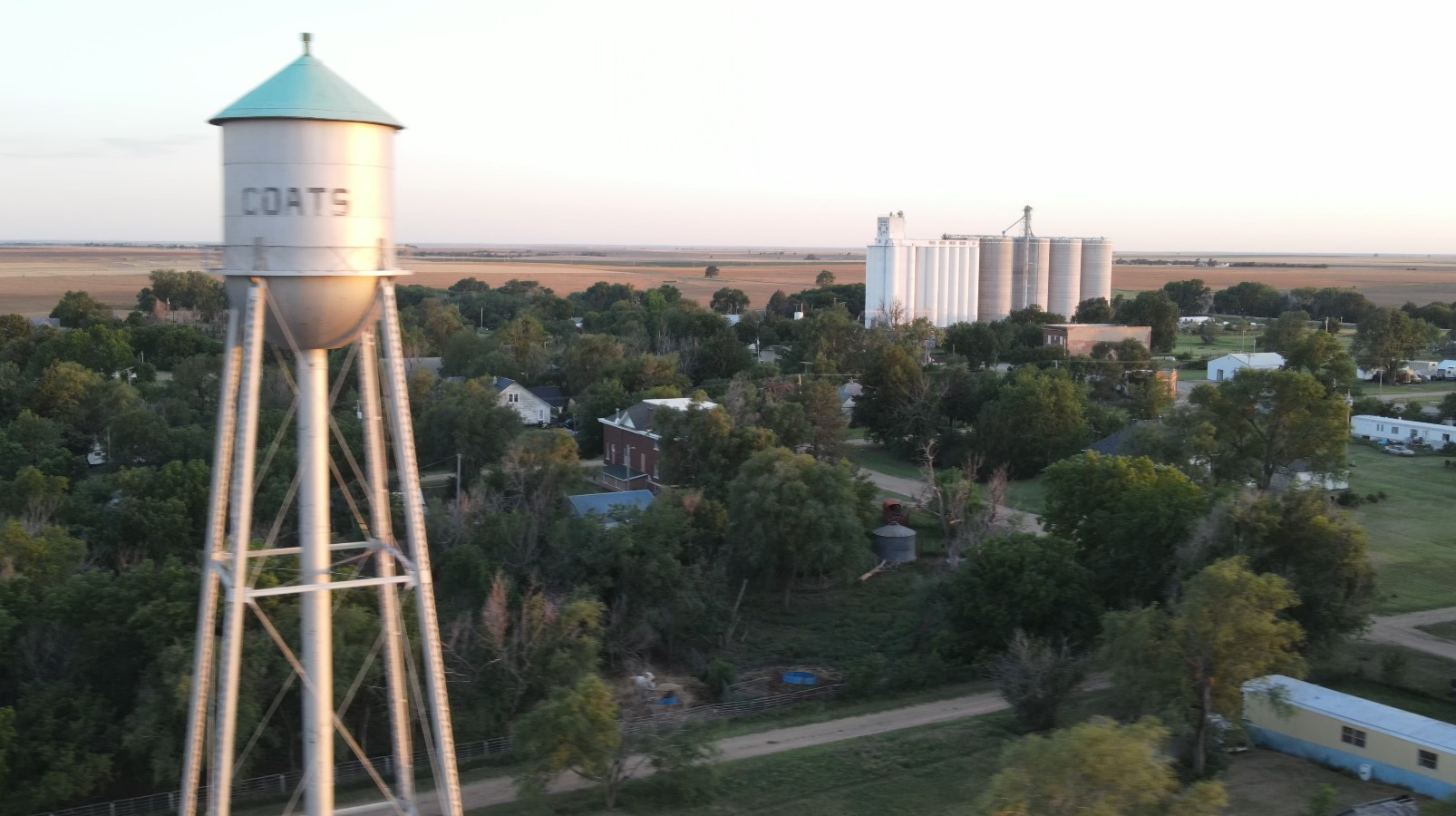
- Skyview of Coats (2024)

- Location within Pratt County and Kansas

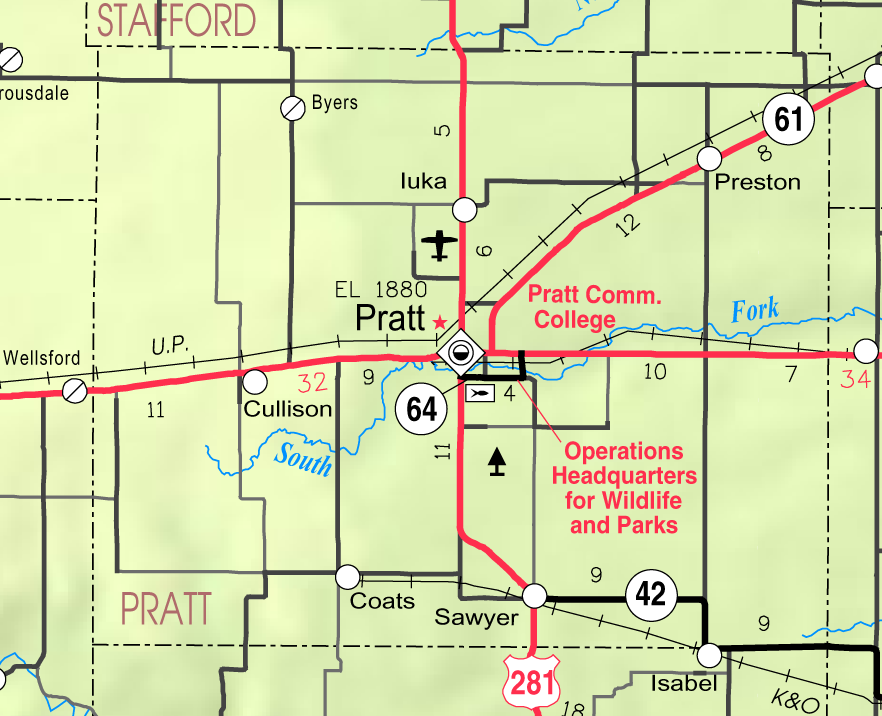
- KDOT map of Pratt County (legend)
- Coordinates: 37°30′39″N 98°49′31″W
- Country: United States
- State: Kansas
- County: Pratt
- Founded: 1887
- Incorporated: 1909
- Named for: William Coats

Area
  - Total: 0.23 sq mi (0.59 km^{2})
  - Land: 0.23 sq mi (0.59 km^{2})
  - Water: 0 sq mi (0.00 km^{2})
- Elevation: 1,969 ft (600 m)

Population (2020)
  - Total: 68
  - Density: 300/sq mi (120/km^{2})
- Time zone: UTC-6 (CST)
  - Summer (DST): UTC-5 (CDT)
- ZIP Code: 67028
- Area code: 620
- FIPS code: 20-14525
- GNIS ID: 2393580

Coats is a city in Pratt County, Kansas, United States. As of the 2020 census, the population of the city was 68. It is located approximately 12 miles southwest of Pratt.

== History ==
Coats was founded in about 1887 by William A. Coats, and named for him. Coats was incorporated as a city within the now-defunct Grant Township in 1909. The town formerly hosted a stop on the Wichita & Englewood division Atchison, Topeka, and Santa Fe Railroad and had a weekly newspaper (the Courant).

The first post office in Coats was established in June 1887.

== Geography ==
According to the United States Census Bureau, the city has a total area of 0.21 square miles (0.54 km^{2}), all land.

=== Climate ===
The climate in this area is characterized by hot, humid summers and generally mild to cool winters. According to the Köppen Climate Classification system, Coats has a humid subtropical climate, abbreviated "Cfa" on climate maps.

== Demographics ==
Historical population
Census	Pop.	Note	%±
1910	269		—
1920	383		42.4%
1930	345		−9.9%
1940	304		−11.9%
1950	255		−16.1%
1960	152		−40.4%
1970	152		0.0%
1980	153		0.7%
1990	127		−17.0%
2000	112		−11.8%
2010	83		−25.9%
2020	68		−18.1%
U.S. Decennial Census

=== 2020 census ===
The 2020 United States census counted 68 people, 32 households, and 21 families in Coats. The population density was 299.6 per square mile (115.7/km^{2}). There were 45 housing units at an average density of 198.2 per square mile (76.5/km^{2}). The racial makeup was 91.18% (62) white or European American (85.29% non-Hispanic white), 0.0% (0) black or African-American, 1.47% (1) Native American or Alaska Native, 0.0% (0) Asian, 0.0% (0) Pacific Islander or Native Hawaiian, 4.41% (3) from other races, and 2.94% (2) from two or more races. Hispanic or Latino of any race was 13.24% (9) of the population.

Of the 32 households, 40.6% had children under the age of 18; 46.9% were married couples living together; 31.2% had a female householder with no spouse or partner present. 25.0% of households consisted of individuals and 9.4% had someone living alone who was 65 years of age or older. The average household size was 2.0 and the average family size was 2.2. The percent of those with a bachelor's degree or higher was estimated to be 4.4% of the population.

22.1% of the population was under the age of 18, 5.9% from 18 to 24, 20.6% from 25 to 44, 27.9% from 45 to 64, and 23.5% who were 65 years of age or older. The median age was 45.3 years. For every 100 females, there were 83.8 males. For every 100 females ages 18 and older, there were 82.8 males.

The 2016–2020 5-year American Community Survey estimates show that the median household income was $58,125 (with a margin of error of +/- $53,643) and the median family income was $62,870 (+/- $31,496). Males had a median income of $30,438 (+/- $6,627) versus $36,042 (+/- $20,478) for females. The median income for those above 16 years old was $30,750 (+/- $4,610). Approximately, 6.7% of families and 9.1% of the population were below the poverty line, including 14.9% of those under the age of 18 and 8.3% of those ages 65 or over.

=== 2010 census ===
As of the census of 2010, there were 83 people, 31 households, and 21 families residing in the city. The population density was 395.2 inhabitants per square mile (152.6/km^{2}). There were 61 housing units at an average density of 290.5 per square mile (112.2/km^{2}). The racial makeup of the city was 95.2% White, 1.2% from other races, and 3.6% from two or more races. Hispanic or Latino of any race were 8.4% of the population.

There were 31 households, of which 32.3% had children under the age of 18 living with them, 54.8% were married couples living together, 9.7% had a female householder with no husband present, 3.2% had a male householder with no wife present, and 32.3% were non-families. 25.8% of all households were made up of individuals, and 25.8% had someone living alone who was 65 years of age or older. The average household size was 2.68 and the average family size was 3.24.

The median age in the city was 37.8 years. 25.3% of residents were under the age of 18; 4.7% were between the ages of 18 and 24; 22.8% were from 25 to 44; 32.4% were from 45 to 64; and 14.5% were 65 years of age or older. The gender makeup of the city was 48.2% male and 51.8% female.

== Education ==
The community is served by Skyline USD 438 public school district. Students attend schools located two miles west of Pratt.

== Transportation ==
The Atchison, Topeka and Santa Fe Railway formerly provided passenger rail service to Coats on a line between Wichita and Englewood. Dedicated passenger service was provided until at least 1958, while mixed trains continued until at least 1961. As of 2025, the nearest passenger rail station is located in Hutchinson, where Amtrak's Southwest Chief stops once daily on a route from Chicago to Los Angeles.
