= Parachute Building =

- U.S. National Register of Historic Places
- Location within Kansas Location within the United States
- Location: 40131 Barker Ave., Pratt, Kansas
- Coordinates: 37°42′15″N 98°44′27″W
- Area: 1 acre (0.40 ha)
- Built: 1942
- Built by: US Army Corps of Engineers
- Architectural style: mid-20th c. military
- NRHP reference No.: 09000231
- Added to NRHP: April 22, 2009

The Parachute Building in Pratt, Kansas, located at 40131 Barker Ave., was built in 1942 during World War II by the US Army Corps of Engineers. It was listed on the National Register of Historic Places in 2009.

It was a parachute rigging and cleaning facility.
