= Pearl Farmer Richardson =

American pacifist (1891–1980)

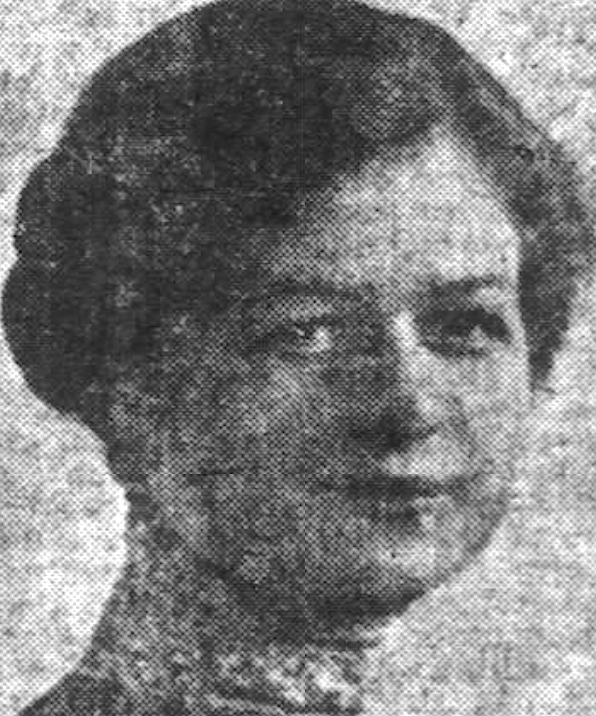
- Pearl Farmer Richardson, from a 1918 newspaper
- Born: Ellen Pearl Farmer; July 25, 1891; Pratt, Kansas, U.S.
- Died: May 9, 1980 (aged 88); Pratt, Kansas, U.S.
- Occupations: Clubwoman; pacifist
- Spouse: Howard Moses Richardson (m. 1912; died 1944)
- Children: 1

Ellen Pearl Farmer Richardson (July 25, 1891 – May 9, 1980) was an American clubwoman and pacifist. She worked on the Speakers Research Committee of the United Nations, and represented the General Federation of Women's Clubs as an observer at the United Nations.

== Early life and education ==
Pearl Farmer was from Pratt, Kansas, the daughter of James Wilson Farmer and Sarah Elizabeth Jackson Farmer. Her mother was active in church work and was "chairman of the knitting department of the local Red Cross" during World War I.

== Career ==
Richardson began women's clubwork in the 1910s, as president of the Pratt Council of Clubs in Kansas. In the 1920s she started the 75ers Dinner, an annual dinner for Pratt County residents aged 75 or over; this tradition continued for at least 76 years. In 1939 she attended the meeting of the Committee on the Cause and Cure for War in Washington, D.C. and was one of the International Building's hostesses at the New York World's Fair. In 1944, she was war service chair for the Kansas Federation of Women's Clubs.

Beginning in 1945, when she witnessed the signing of the UN charter in San Francisco, Richardson represented the General Federation of Women's Clubs as an observer at the United Nations, and served on the Speakers Research Committee of the UN. She spoke about the United Nations to community groups, especially church and women's groups, and wrote about its goals and structures. "It is not enough to hope that the United Nations succeeds," she said in a typical speech, in Kansas in 1954. "To make it work, people must do something about it."

Richardson served on the publicity committee of the National Board of the YWCA, and was a consultant on world relations to the United Church Women of the National Council of Churches. She was a member of the advisory committee to the White House Conference on Children and Youth. She was also a member of the National Aeronautical Association and the National Federation of Press Women, among other affiliations. She taught world affairs at a girls' camp in Elmdale, Kansas for three summers.

Eleanor Roosevelt wrote one of her "My Day" newspaper columns about Richardson's pamphlet, Your Community United Nations, in 1957. In 1958, she was named one of fifty prominent Kansas women by the Women's Kansas Day Club.

== Publications ==
- "We The Peoples: Community Fact Finders" (1952)
- Your Community United Nations (1957)

== Personal life ==
Pearl Farmer married railroad engineer Howard Moses Richardson in 1912. They had a daughter, Maxine. Her husband died in 1944, and she died in 1980, at the age of 88, in Pratt, Kansas.
