= Byers, Kansas =

City in Pratt County, Kansas

- City
- Location within Pratt County and Kansas

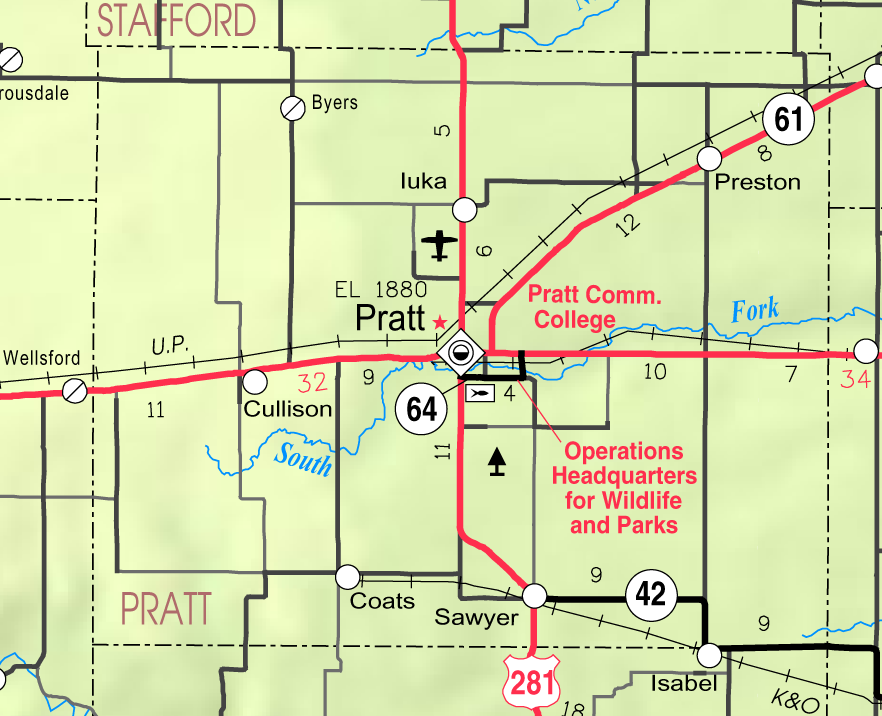
- KDOT map of Pratt County (legend)
- Coordinates: 37°47′16″N 98°52′01″W
- Country: United States
- State: Kansas
- County: Pratt
- Founded: 1914
- Incorporated: 1915
- Named for: Otto Byers

Area
  - Total: 0.17 sq mi (0.44 km^{2})
  - Land: 0.17 sq mi (0.44 km^{2})
  - Water: 0 sq mi (0.00 km^{2})
- Elevation: 2,005 ft (611 m)

Population (2020)
  - Total: 38
  - Density: 220/sq mi (86/km^{2})
- Time zone: UTC-6 (CST)
  - Summer (DST): UTC-5 (CDT)
- ZIP Code: 67021
- Area code: 620
- FIPS code: 20-09800
- GNIS ID: 2393485

Byers is a city in Pratt County, Kansas, United States. As of the 2020 census, the population of the city was 38.

== History ==
Byers was founded in 1914. It was named for Otto Phillip Byers.

The first post office in Byers was established in April 1915.

== Geography ==
According to the United States Census Bureau, the city has a total area of 0.19 square miles (0.49 km^{2}), all land.

== Demographics ==
Historical population
Census	Pop.	Note	%±
1920	212		—
1930	185		−12.7%
1940	153		−17.3%
1950	83		−45.8%
1960	52		−37.3%
1970	46		−11.5%
1980	47		2.2%
1990	46		−2.1%
2000	50		8.7%
2010	35		−30.0%
2020	38		8.6%
U.S. Decennial Census

=== 2020 census ===
The 2020 United States census counted 38 people, 15 households, and 11 families in Byers. The population density was 224.9 per square mile (86.8/km^{2}). There were 18 housing units at an average density of 106.5 per square mile (41.1/km^{2}). The racial makeup was 89.47% (34) white or European American (86.84% non-Hispanic white), 0.0% (0) black or African-American, 0.0% (0) Native American or Alaska Native, 0.0% (0) Asian, 0.0% (0) Pacific Islander or Native Hawaiian, 0.0% (0) from other races, and 10.53% (4) from two or more races. Hispanic or Latino of any race was 10.53% (4) of the population.

Of the 15 households, 33.3% had children under the age of 18; 40.0% were married couples living together; 6.7% had a female householder with no spouse or partner present. 26.7% of households consisted of individuals and 13.3% had someone living alone who was 65 years of age or older. The average household size was 1.5 and the average family size was 2.0. The percent of those with a bachelor's degree or higher was estimated to be 0.0% of the population.

31.6% of the population was under the age of 18, 13.2% from 18 to 24, 23.7% from 25 to 44, 15.8% from 45 to 64, and 15.8% who were 65 years of age or older. The median age was 28.7 years. For every 100 males, there were 81.0 females. For every 100 males ages 18 and older, there were 85.7 females.

The 2016–2020 5-year American Community Survey estimates show that the median family income was $91,667 (+/- $5,545). Males had a median income of $48,125 (+/- $32,359) versus $27,917 (+/- $7,442) for females. The median income for those above 16 years old was $30,714 (+/- $2,352).

=== 2010 census ===
As of the census of 2010, there were 35 people, 15 households, and 9 families residing in the city. The population density was 184.2 inhabitants per square mile (71.1/km^{2}). There were 21 housing units at an average density of 110.5 per square mile (42.7/km^{2}). The racial makeup of the city was 94.3% White and 5.7% from two or more races.

There were 15 households, of which 26.7% had children under the age of 18 living with them, 46.7% were married couples living together, 6.7% had a female householder with no husband present, 6.7% had a male householder with no wife present, and 40.0% were non-families. 40.0% of all households were made up of individuals, and 26.7% had someone living alone who was 65 years of age or older. The average household size was 2.33 and the average family size was 3.00.

The median age in the city was 43.5 years. 25.7% of residents were under the age of 18; 11.4% were between the ages of 18 and 24; 14.4% were from 25 to 44; 25.8% were from 45 to 64; and 22.9% were 65 years of age or older. The gender makeup of the city was 42.9% male and 57.1% female.

== Education ==
The community is served by Skyline USD 438 public school district. Students attend schools located two miles west of Pratt.

Byers High School (called the Hornets) became defunct in 1966.
