= Pratt USD 382 =

Public school district in Pratt, Kansas

Address
- 401 S Hamilton St. Pratt, Kansas, 67124; United States
- Coordinates: 37.642°N 98.744°W

District information
- Type: Public
- Grades: PreK to 12
- Schools: 5

Other information
- Website: usd382.com

Pratt USD 382 is a public unified school district headquartered in Pratt, Kansas, United States. The district includes the communities of Pratt, Iuka, Preston, Cairo, Natrona, and nearby rural areas.

== Schools ==
The school district operates the following schools:

- Pratt Senior High School
- Liberty Middle School
- SW Elementary School
- Early Childhood Center (PreK)
- Pratt Learning Center

== See also ==
- Skyline USD 438, school district west of Pratt
- Kansas State Department of Education
- Kansas State High School Activities Association
- List of high schools in Kansas
- List of unified school districts in Kansas
