= Skyline USD 438 =

Public school district west of Pratt, Kansas

Address
- 20269 West Hwy 54 Pratt, Kansas, 67124; United States

District information
- Type: Public
- Grades: PreK to 12
- Established: 1960s
- Superintendent: Morgan Ballard
- Schools: 1

Students and staff
- Students: 415

Other information
- Website: skylineschools.org

Skyline USD 438 is a public unified school district headquartered two miles west of Pratt, Kansas, United States. The district includes the communities of Byers, Coats, Cullison, Sawyer, Croft, and nearby rural areas.

== Schools ==
The school district operates the following schools within one building:

- Skyline High School
- Skyline Middle School
- Skyline Elementary School

== See also ==
- Pratt USD 382, school district in Pratt
- Kansas State Department of Education
- Kansas State High School Activities Association
- List of high schools in Kansas
- List of unified school districts in Kansas
