= Sawyer, Kansas =

City in Pratt County, Kansas

- City
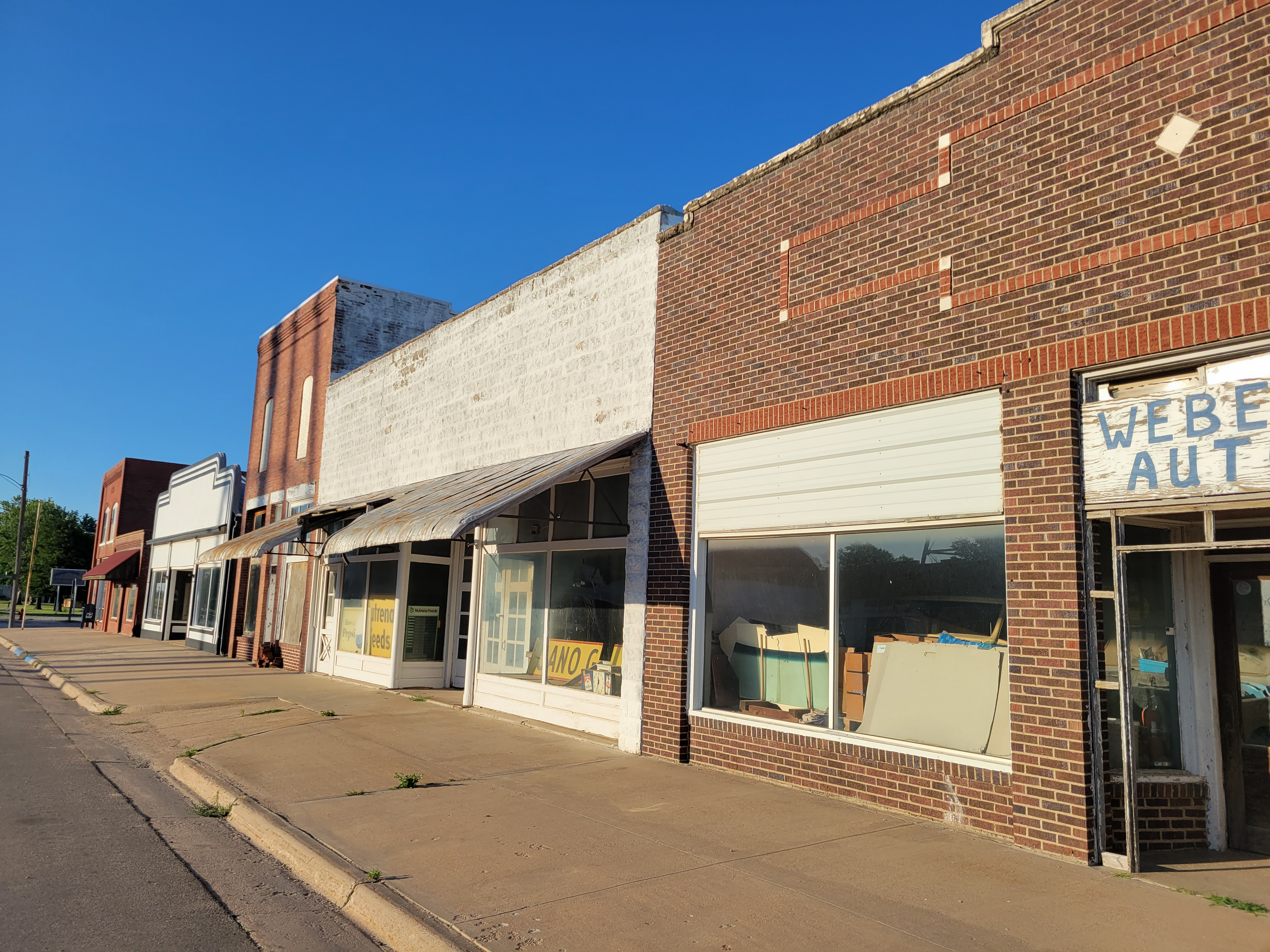
- Main Street in Sawyer (2024)

- Location within Pratt County and Kansas

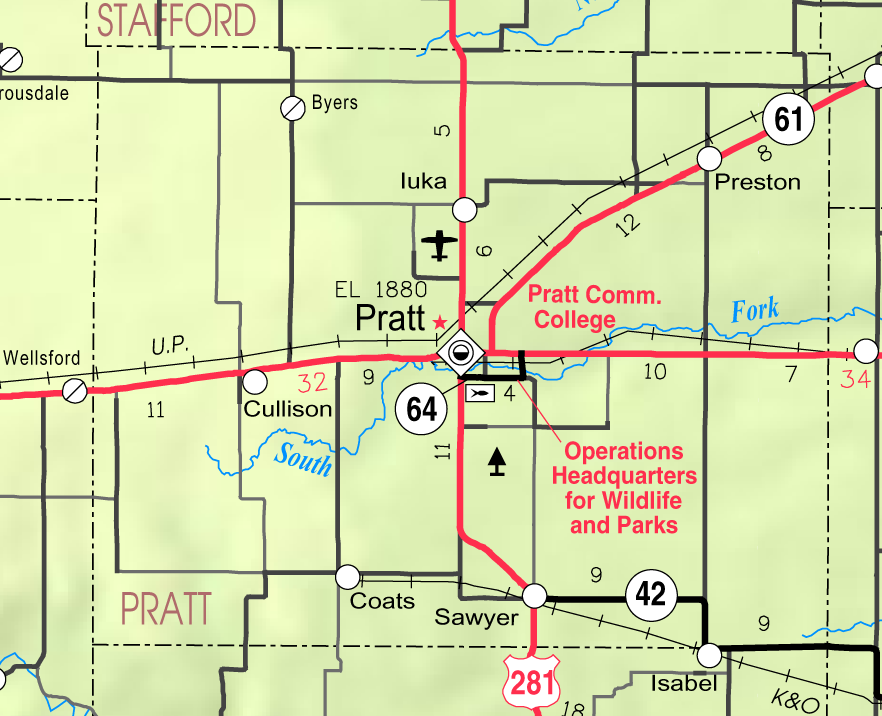
- KDOT map of Pratt County (legend)
- Coordinates: 37°29′54″N 98°40′59″W
- Country: United States
- State: Kansas
- County: Pratt
- Founded: 1886-1887
- Incorporated: 1914
- Named for: Warren Sawyer

Area
  - Total: 0.18 sq mi (0.47 km^{2})
  - Land: 0.18 sq mi (0.47 km^{2})
  - Water: 0 sq mi (0.00 km^{2})
- Elevation: 1,916 ft (584 m)

Population (2020)
  - Total: 89
  - Density: 490/sq mi (190/km^{2})
- Time zone: UTC-6 (CST)
  - Summer (DST): UTC-5 (CDT)
- ZIP Code: 67134
- Area code: 620
- FIPS code: 20-63275
- GNIS ID: 2396547

Sawyer is a city in Pratt County, Kansas, United States. As of the 2020 census, the population of the city was 89.

== History ==
Sawyer was founded in about 1886. It was named for Warren Sawyer, a railroad official.

The first post office in Sawyer was established in June 1887.

== Geography ==
According to the United States Census Bureau, the city has a total area of 0.14 square miles (0.36 km^{2}), all land.

== Demographics ==
Historical population
Census	Pop.	Note	%±
1920	263		—
1930	276		4.9%
1940	239		−13.4%
1950	223		−6.7%
1960	192		−13.9%
1970	164		−14.6%
1980	213		29.9%
1990	183		−14.1%
2000	124		−32.2%
2010	124		0.0%
2020	89		−28.2%
U.S. Decennial Census

=== 2010 census ===
As of the census of 2010, there were 124 people, 52 households, and 29 families residing in the city. The population density was 885.7 inhabitants per square mile (342.0/km^{2}). There were 70 housing units at an average density of 500.0 per square mile (193.1/km^{2}). The racial makeup of the city was 100.0% White. Hispanic or Latino of any race were 5.6% of the population.

There were 52 households, of which 30.8% had children under the age of 18 living with them, 46.2% were married couples living together, 7.7% had a female householder with no husband present, 1.9% had a male householder with no wife present, and 44.2% were non-families. 44.2% of all households were made up of individuals, and 25% had someone living alone who was 65 years of age or older. The average household size was 2.38 and the average family size was 3.48.

The median age in the city was 31 years. 34.7% of residents were under the age of 18; 8.9% were between the ages of 18 and 24; 19.3% were from 25 to 44; 24.3% were from 45 to 64; and 12.9% were 65 years of age or older. The gender makeup of the city was 50.0% male and 50.0% female.

=== 2000 census ===
As of the census of 2000, there were 124 people, 57 households, and 40 families residing in the city. The population density was 921.6 inhabitants per square mile (355.8/km^{2}). There were 76 housing units at an average density of 564.9 per square mile (218.1/km^{2}). The racial makeup of the city was 100.00% White.

There were 57 households, out of which 14.0% had children under the age of 18 living with them, 66.7% were married couples living together, 1.8% had a female householder with no husband present, and 29.8% were non-families. 28.1% of all households were made up of individuals, and 14.0% had someone living alone who was 65 years of age or older. The average household size was 2.18 and the average family size was 2.60.

In the city, the population was spread out, with 13.7% under the age of 18, 8.1% from 18 to 24, 23.4% from 25 to 44, 35.5% from 45 to 64, and 19.4% who were 65 years of age or older. The median age was 47 years. For every 100 females, there were 87.9 males. For every 100 females age 18 and over, there were 87.7 males.

The median income for a household in the city was $24,688, and the median income for a family was $32,917. Males had a median income of $26,875 versus $22,083 for females. The per capita income for the city was $12,357. There were 12.5% of families and 17.1% of the population living below the poverty line, including 41.7% of under eighteens and 21.2% of those over 64.

== Education ==
The community is served by Skyline USD 438 public school district. Students attend schools located two miles west of Pratt.

Sawyer High School was closed through school unification. The Sawyer High School mascot was Eagles.

== Transportation ==
The Atchison, Topeka and Santa Fe Railway formerly provided passenger rail service to Sawyer on a line between Wichita and Englewood. Dedicated passenger service was provided until at least 1958, while mixed trains continued until at least 1961. As of 2025, the nearest passenger rail station is located in Hutchinson, where Amtrak's Southwest Chief stops once daily on a route from Chicago to Los Angeles.
