= Iuka, Kansas =

City in Pratt County, Kansas

- City
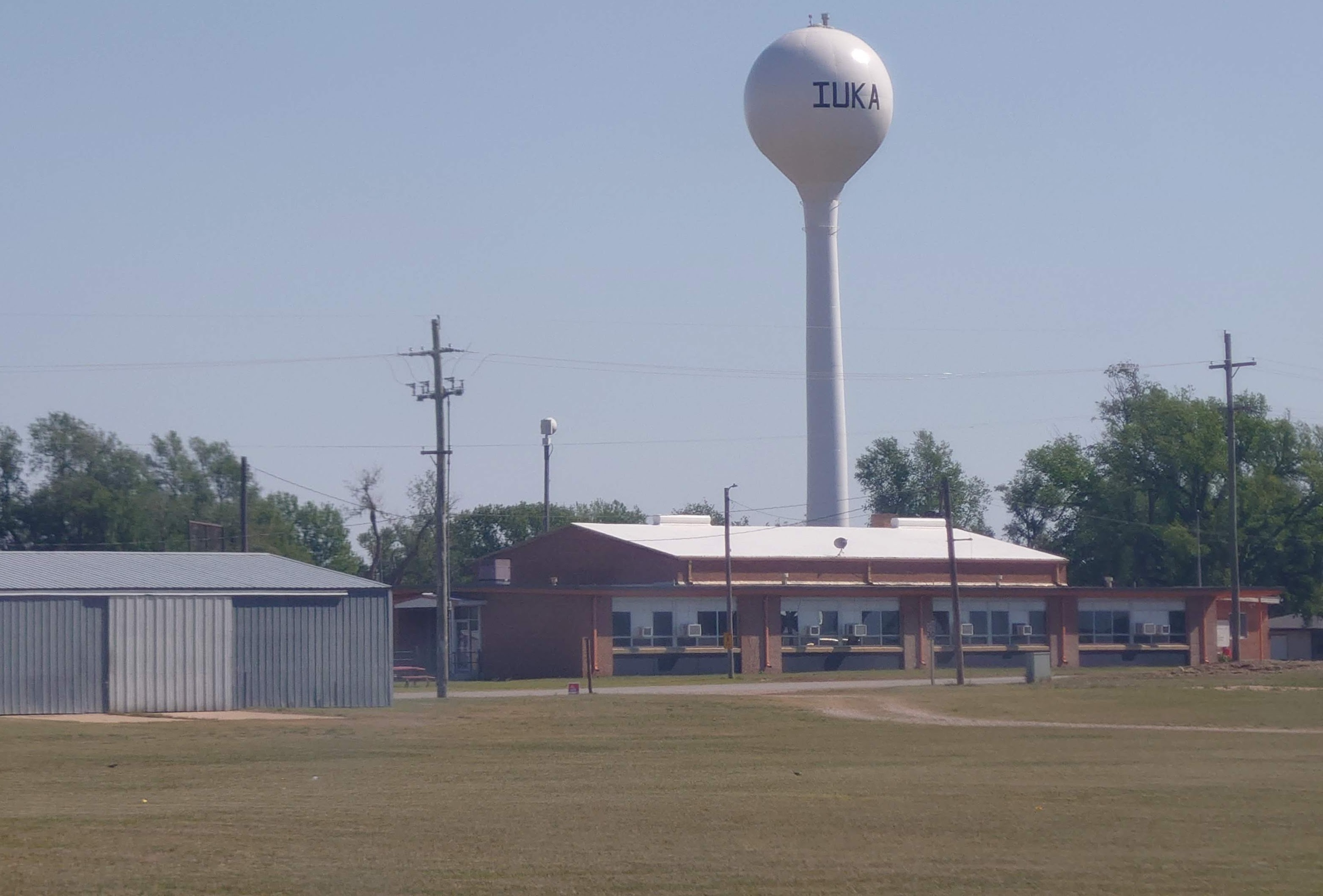
- Town water tower as seen from U.S. Route 281 (2026)

- Location within Pratt County and Kansas

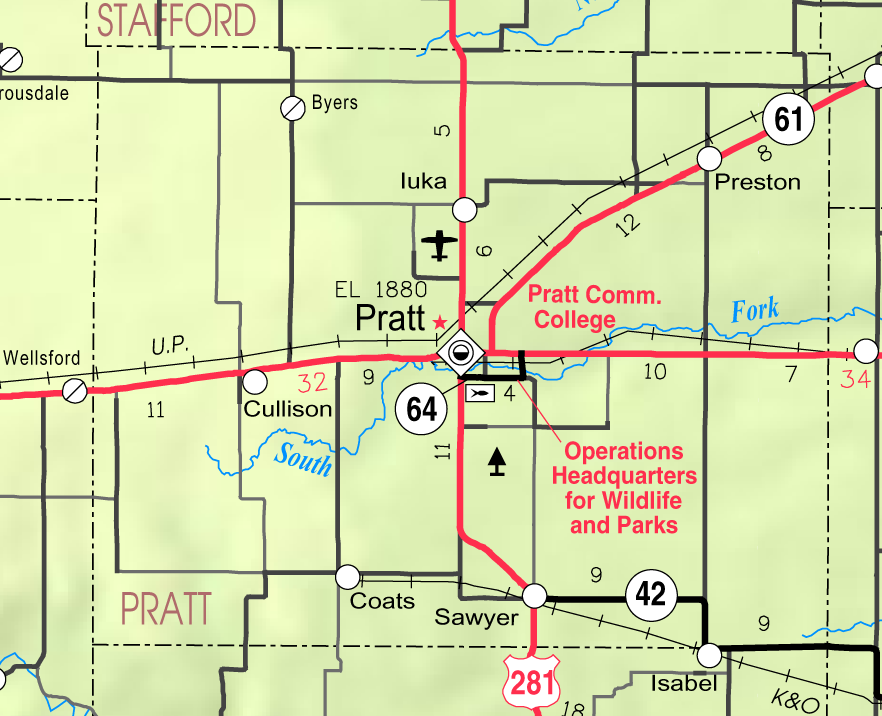
- KDOT map of Pratt County (legend)
- Coordinates: 37°43′44″N 98°43′58″W
- Country: United States
- State: Kansas
- County: Pratt
- Founded: 1877
- Incorporated: 1908
- Named for: Battle of Iuka

Area
  - Total: 0.66 sq mi (1.70 km^{2})
  - Land: 0.66 sq mi (1.70 km^{2})
  - Water: 0 sq mi (0.00 km^{2})
- Elevation: 1,952 ft (595 m)

Population (2020)
  - Total: 151
  - Density: 230/sq mi (88.8/km^{2})
- Time zone: UTC-6 (CST)
  - Summer (DST): UTC-5 (CDT)
- ZIP Code: 67066
- Area code: 620
- FIPS code: 20-34625
- GNIS ID: 2395445
- Website: iukaks.com

Iuka is a city in Pratt County, Kansas, United States. As of the 2020 census, the population of the city was 151.

== History ==
Iuka was settled in 1877. It was named in commemoration of the Battle of Iuka in Iuka, Mississippi. Iuka was once the county seat.

The first post office in Iuka was established in December 1877.

== Geography ==
According to the United States Census Bureau, the city has a total area of 0.60 square miles (1.55 km^{2}), all land.

== Demographics ==
Historical population
Census	Pop.	Note	%±
1910	228		—
1920	198		−13.2%
1930	185		−6.6%
1940	183		−1.1%
1950	129		−29.5%
1960	225		74.4%
1970	210		−6.7%
1980	235		11.9%
1990	197		−16.2%
2000	185		−6.1%
2010	163		−11.9%
2020	151		−7.4%
U.S. Decennial Census

=== 2020 census ===
The 2020 United States census counted 151 people, 64 households, and 47 families in Iuka. The population density was 229.8 per square mile (88.7/km^{2}). There were 70 housing units at an average density of 106.5 per square mile (41.1/km^{2}). The racial makeup was 94.04% (142) white or European American (92.05% non-Hispanic white), 0.0% (0) black or African-American, 0.0% (0) Native American or Alaska Native, 0.0% (0) Asian, 0.0% (0) Pacific Islander or Native Hawaiian, 0.0% (0) from other races, and 5.96% (9) from two or more races. Hispanic or Latino of any race was 4.64% (7) of the population.

Of the 64 households, 23.4% had children under the age of 18; 64.1% were married couples living together; 15.6% had a female householder with no spouse or partner present. 25.0% of households consisted of individuals and 12.5% had someone living alone who was 65 years of age or older. The average household size was 2.0 and the average family size was 2.2. The percent of those with a bachelor's degree or higher was estimated to be 21.2% of the population.

25.2% of the population was under the age of 18, 4.0% from 18 to 24, 19.2% from 25 to 44, 23.2% from 45 to 64, and 28.5% who were 65 years of age or older. The median age was 48.8 years. For every 100 females, there were 84.1 males. For every 100 females ages 18 and older, there were 82.3 males.

The 2016–2020 5-year American Community Survey estimates show that the median household income was $47,986 (with a margin of error of +/- $4,265) and the median family income was $47,813 (+/- $9,178). Males had a median income of $33,750 (+/- $25,832) versus $21,328 (+/- $1,468) for females. The median income for those above 16 years old was $23,875 (+/- $5,740). Approximately, 12.5% of families and 9.0% of the population were below the poverty line, including 14.3% of those under the age of 18 and 0.0% of those ages 65 or over.

=== 2010 census ===
As of the census of 2010, there were 163 people, 79 households, and 49 families residing in the city. The population density was 271.7 inhabitants per square mile (104.9/km^{2}). There were 83 housing units at an average density of 138.3 per square mile (53.4/km^{2}). The racial makeup of the city was 96.9% White, 1.8% from other races, and 1.2% from two or more races. Hispanic or Latino of any race were 6.7% of the population.

There were 79 households, of which 24.1% had children under the age of 18 living with them, 55.7% were married couples living together, 5.1% had a female householder with no husband present, 1.3% had a male householder with no wife present, and 38.0% were non-families. 30.4% of all households were made up of individuals, and 12.7% had someone living alone who was 65 years of age or older. The average household size was 2.06 and the average family size was 2.59.

The median age in the city was 48.9 years. 19% of residents were under the age of 18; 5.6% were between the ages of 18 and 24; 21.5% were from 25 to 44; 29.4% were from 45 to 64; and 24.5% were 65 years of age or older. The gender makeup of the city was 49.7% male and 50.3% female.

== Education ==
The community is served by Pratt USD 382 public school district.
