= Cullison, Kansas =

City in Pratt County, Kansas

- City
- Location within Pratt County and Kansas

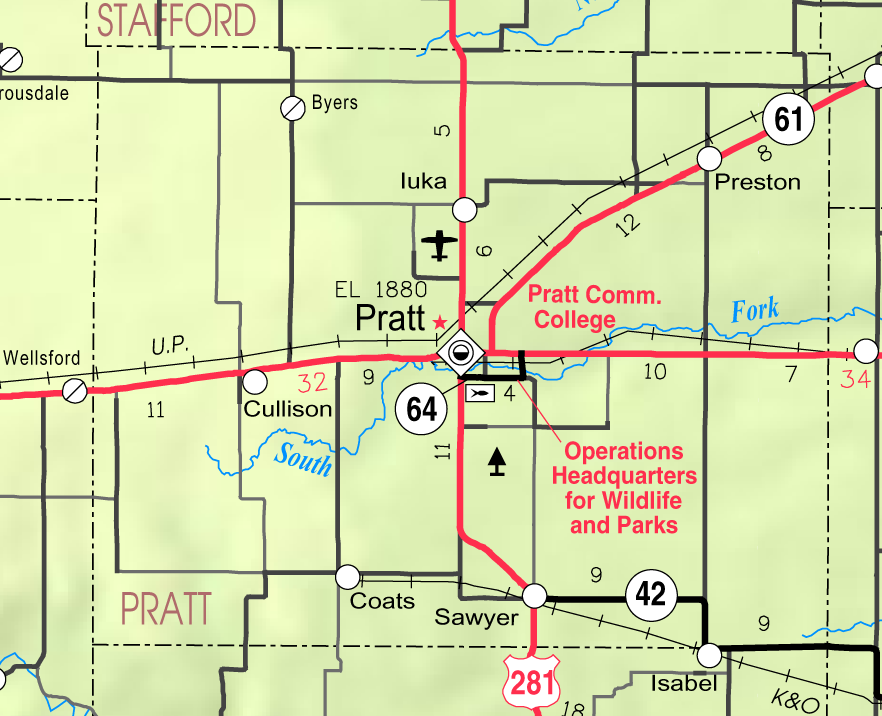
- KDOT map of Pratt County (legend)
- Coordinates: 37°37′49″N 98°54′19″W
- Country: United States
- State: Kansas
- County: Pratt
- Founded: 1880s
- Incorporated: 1887
- Named for: John & Mary Cullison

Area
  - Total: 0.17 sq mi (0.45 km^{2})
  - Land: 0.17 sq mi (0.45 km^{2})
  - Water: 0 sq mi (0.00 km^{2})
- Elevation: 2,038 ft (621 m)

Population (2020)
  - Total: 83
  - Density: 480/sq mi (180/km^{2})
- Time zone: UTC-6 (CST)
  - Summer (DST): UTC-5 (CDT)
- ZIP Code: 67124
- Area code: 620
- FIPS code: 20-16675
- GNIS ID: 2393692

Cullison is a city in Pratt County, Kansas, United States. As of the 2020 census, the population of the city was 83.

== History ==
Cullison was a station and shipping point on the Chicago, Rock Island and Pacific Railroad. Cullison was named for John B. and Mary M. Cullison, original owners of the town site.

A post office was opened in Cullison in 1885, and remained in operation until it was discontinued in 1967.

== Geography ==
According to the United States Census Bureau, the city has a total area of 0.17 square miles (0.44 km^{2}), all land.

== Demographics ==
Historical population
Census	Pop.	Note	%±
1910	256		—
1920	249		−2.7%
1930	256		2.8%
1940	239		−6.6%
1950	174		−27.2%
1960	129		−25.9%
1970	117		−9.3%
1980	154		31.6%
1990	120		−22.1%
2000	98		−18.3%
2010	101		3.1%
2020	83		−17.8%
U.S. Decennial Census

=== 2020 census ===
The 2020 United States census counted 83 people, 26 households, and 19 families in Cullison. The population density was 479.8 per square mile (185.2/km^{2}). There were 64 housing units at an average density of 369.9 per square mile (142.8/km^{2}). The racial makeup was 85.54% (71) white or European American (85.54% non-Hispanic white), 1.2% (1) black or African-American, 0.0% (0) Native American or Alaska Native, 0.0% (0) Asian, 0.0% (0) Pacific Islander or Native Hawaiian, 0.0% (0) from other races, and 13.25% (11) from two or more races. Hispanic or Latino of any race was 7.23% (6) of the population.

Of the 26 households, 19.2% had children under the age of 18; 57.7% were married couples living together; 15.4% had a female householder with no spouse or partner present. 26.9% of households consisted of individuals and 11.5% had someone living alone who was 65 years of age or older. The average household size was 2.5 and the average family size was 3.7. The percent of those with a bachelor's degree or higher was estimated to be 7.2% of the population.

19.3% of the population was under the age of 18, 14.5% from 18 to 24, 14.5% from 25 to 44, 28.9% from 45 to 64, and 22.9% who were 65 years of age or older. The median age was 46.5 years. For every 100 females, there were 124.3 males. For every 100 females ages 18 and older, there were 109.4 males.

The 2016–2020 5-year American Community Survey estimates show that the median household income was $38,750 (with a margin of error of +/- $24,907). Males had a median income of $32,083 (+/- $19,031) versus $21,250 (+/- $8,134) for females. The median income for those above 16 years old was $28,125 (+/- $11,955). Approximately, 5.6% of families and 11.0% of the population were below the poverty line, including 33.3% of those under the age of 18 and 21.4% of those ages 65 or over.

=== 2010 census ===
As of the census of 2010, there were 101 people, 37 households, and 28 families residing in the city. The population density was 594.1 inhabitants per square mile (229.4/km^{2}). There were 44 housing units at an average density of 258.8 per square mile (99.9/km^{2}). The racial makeup of the city was 94.1% White, 3.0% from other races, and 3.0% from two or more races. Hispanic or Latino of any race were 3.0% of the population.

There were 37 households, of which 35.1% had children under the age of 18 living with them, 62.2% were married couples living together, 2.7% had a female householder with no husband present, 10.8% had a male householder with no wife present, and 24.3% were non-families. 21.6% of all households were made up of individuals, and 5.4% had someone living alone who was 65 years of age or older. The average household size was 2.73 and the average family size was 3.14.

The median age in the city was 31.8 years. 28.7% of residents were under the age of 18; 10.8% were between the ages of 18 and 24; 23.8% were from 25 to 44; 24.7% were from 45 to 64; and 11.9% were 65 years of age or older. The gender makeup of the city was 58.4% male and 41.6% female.

== Education ==
The community is served by Skyline USD 438 public school district. Students attend schools located two miles west of Pratt.
