= Pratt County, Kansas =

County in Kansas, United States

- County
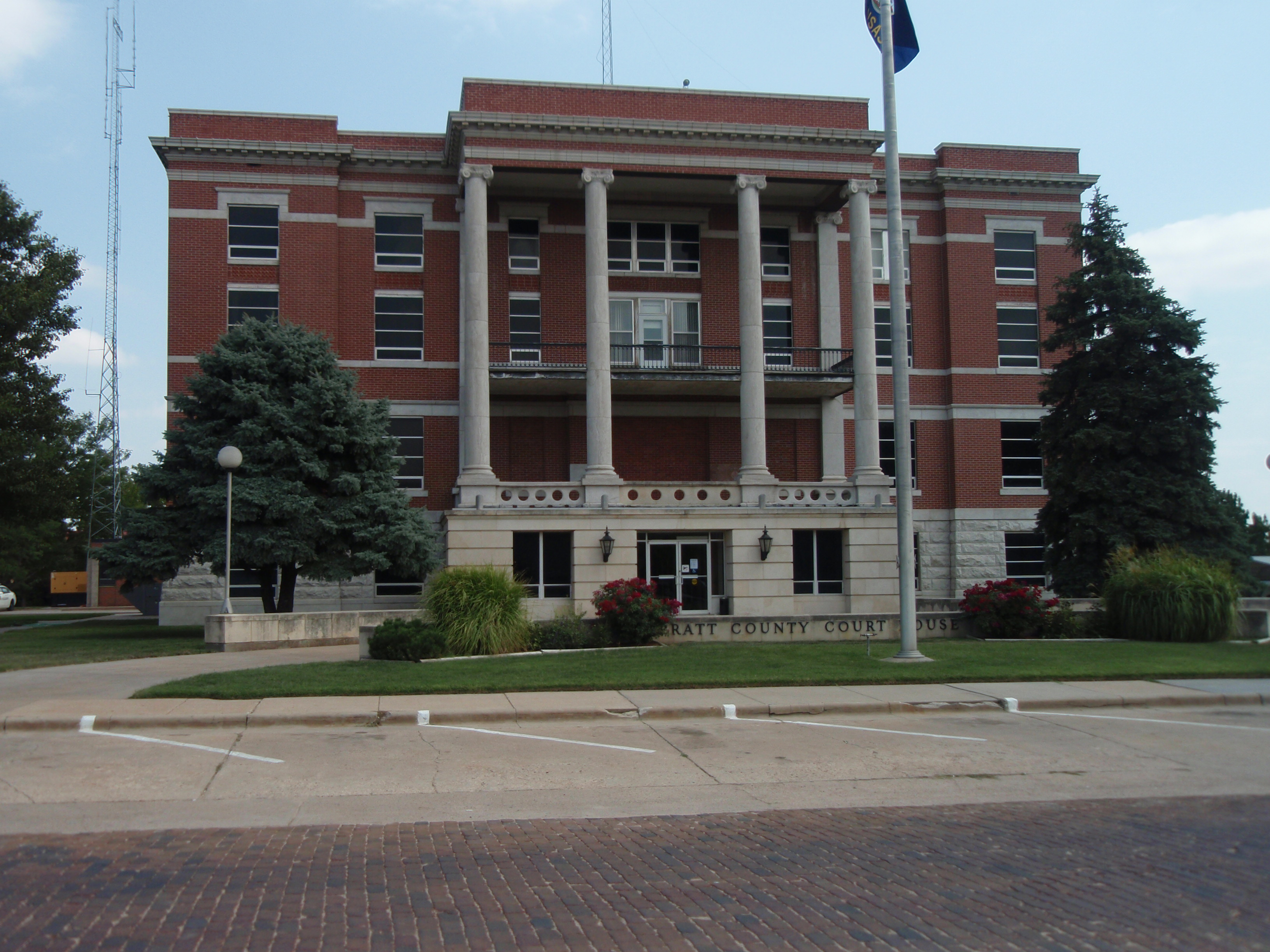
- Pratt County Courthouse in Pratt (2009)

- Location within the U.S. state of Kansas
- Coordinates: 37°39′24″N 98°44′24″W
- Country: United States
- State: Kansas
- Founded: February 26, 1867
- Named for: Caleb S. Pratt
- Seat: Pratt
- Largest city: Pratt

Area
  - Total: 736 sq mi (1,910 km^{2})
  - Land: 735 sq mi (1,900 km^{2})
  - Water: 0.7 sq mi (1.8 km^{2}) 0.09%

Population (2020)
  - Total: 9,157
  - Estimate (2025): 9,117 ▼
  - Density: 12.5/sq mi (4.8/km^{2})
- Time zone: UTC−6 (Central)
  - Summer (DST): UTC−5 (CDT)
- Congressional district: 4th
- Website: PrattCounty.org

Pratt County is a county located in the U.S. state of Kansas. Its county seat and largest city is Pratt. As of the 2020 census, the county population was 9,157. The county was named for Caleb Pratt, a U.S. soldier who died in the Battle of Wilson's Creek during the Civil War and who had previously been involved in Bleeding Kansas.

The county consists overwhelmingly of prairie and contains few watercourses; the most important of these is the Ninnescah River.

Farming continues to be important to the county, which is among the state’s leading winter wheat producers.

== History ==
Pratt County was established in 1867. The county's first attempt at organization, termed the "fraudulent organization," occurred in 1873. A group from Hutchinson traveled through various counties, organizing them as they went. However, since there were no genuine settlers in Pratt County at the time, this organization required the submission of false statements to the governor. This fraudulent attempt was not recognized, and the Pratt County was legitimately organized in 1879.

The county's first bona fide settler, A. J. Johnson, arrived in the fall of 1873 near Springvale in the southwest corner, where he cultivated the county's first crops. The county saw significant settlement in 1877, primarily from Iowa, and further in 1878 from all sections of the United States, keeping land office officials busy with pre-emption claims. Despite a prosperous period for crops in 1879 and 1880, many settlers departed in subsequent years, while others arrived in large numbers, especially in 1882. During the county's early years, owing to the scarcity of lumber, many constructed sod houses or dugouts.

The special election of September 2, 1879, focused on the choice of a county seat, was disputed due to irregularities. After a lawsuit second election was scheduled for August 19, 1880. In the lead-up to that election, a proponent of Saratoga named W. F. Gibbons made a deal with W. H. Weidner from Medicine Lodge, agreeing to pay him $40 to bring about fifteen cowboys into Pratt County thirty days before the election to vote for Saratoga. Each cowboy was promised $5, free whisky, and a free dance at Saratoga on the night of the election. Weidner located the cowboys and provided Gibbons with a list of names as agreed, receiving $25 as part payment. However, due to a contract dispute, all the cowboys left Pratt County before the election, causing Saratoga to lose their intended votes. Iuka was ultimately declared the county seat with a significant majority.

Efforts to relocate the county seat to Pratt commenced in 1885 and succeeded in 1888 over the objections of Saratoga. An 1888 blizzard killed over 80% of the county's cattle, causing widespread hardship.

In 1887, the Chicago, Kansas and Nebraska Railway extended its main line from Herington to Pratt. This main line connected Herington, Ramona, Tampa, Durham, Waldeck, Canton, Galva, McPherson, Groveland, Inman, Medora, Hutchinson, Whiteside, Partridge, Arlington, Langdon, Turon, Preston, Natrona and Pratt. In 1888, this main line was extended to Liberal. Later, this line was extended to Tucumcari, New Mexico and El Paso, Texas. This line is called the "Golden State Limited".

During World War II, Pratt Army Airfield trained, processed, and housed B-29s and their crews before they were sent to war.

== Geography ==
According to the U.S. Census Bureau, the county has a total area of 736 square miles (1,910 km^{2}), of which 735 square miles (1,900 km^{2}) is land and 0.7 square miles (1.8 km^{2}) (0.09%) is water.

=== Adjacent counties ===
- Stafford County (north)
- Reno County (northeast)
- Kingman County (east)
- Barber County (south)
- Kiowa County (west)
- Edwards County (northwest)

== Demographics ==
Historical population
Census	Pop.	Note	%±
1880	1,890		—
1890	8,118		329.5%
1900	7,085		−12.7%
1910	11,156		57.5%
1920	12,909		15.7%
1930	13,312		3.1%
1940	12,348		−7.2%
1950	12,156		−1.6%
1960	12,122		−0.3%
1970	10,056		−17.0%
1980	10,275		2.2%
1990	9,702		−5.6%
2000	9,647		−0.6%
2010	9,656		0.1%
2020	9,157		−5.2%
2025 (est.)	9,117	▼	−0.4%
U.S. Decennial Census; 1790-1960 1900-1990; 1990-2000 2010-2020

=== Racial and ethnic composition ===
Pratt County, Kansas – Racial and ethnic composition Note: the US Census treats Hispanic/Latino as an ethnic category. This table excludes Latinos from the racial categories and assigns them to a separate category. Hispanics/Latinos may be of any race.
Race / Ethnicity (NH = Non-Hispanic)	Pop 1980	Pop 1990	Pop 2000	Pop 2010	Pop 2020	% 1980	% 1990	% 2000	% 2010	% 2020
White alone (NH)	9,904	9,296	9,095	8,812	7,872	96.39%	95.82%	94.28%	91.26%	85.97%
Black or African American alone (NH)	138	114	91	100	106	1.34%	1.18%	0.94%	1.04%	1.16%
Native American or Alaska Native alone (NH)	40	61	34	38	40	0.39%	0.63%	0.35%	0.39%	0.44%
Asian alone (NH)	22	29	44	26	45	0.21%	0.30%	0.46%	0.27%	0.49%
Native Hawaiian or Pacific Islander alone (NH)	x	x	2	1	7	x	x	0.02%	0.01%	0.08%
Other race alone (NH)	46	19	0	7	36	0.45%	0.20%	0.00%	0.07%	0.39%
Mixed race or Multiracial (NH)	x	x	83	147	310	x	x	0.86%	1.52%	3.39%
Hispanic or Latino (any race)	125	183	298	525	741	1.22%	1.89%	3.09%	5.44%	8.09%
Total	10,275	9,702	9,647	9,656	9,157	100.00%	100.00%	100.00%	100.00%	100.00%

=== 2020 census ===
As of the 2020 census, the county had a population of 9,157. The median age was 39.7 years. 23.8% of residents were under the age of 18 and 21.3% of residents were 65 years of age or older. For every 100 females there were 99.6 males, and for every 100 females age 18 and over there were 97.7 males age 18 and over.

The racial makeup of the county was 88.5% White, 1.2% Black or African American, 0.7% American Indian and Alaska Native, 0.5% Asian, 0.1% Native Hawaiian and Pacific Islander, 3.5% from some other race, and 5.5% from two or more races. Hispanic or Latino residents of any race comprised 8.1% of the population.

72.0% of residents lived in urban areas, while 28.0% lived in rural areas.

There were 3,677 households in the county, of which 28.7% had children under the age of 18 living with them and 25.8% had a female householder with no spouse or partner present. About 33.5% of all households were made up of individuals and 16.3% had someone living alone who was 65 years of age or older.

There were 4,388 housing units, of which 16.2% were vacant. Among occupied housing units, 72.5% were owner-occupied and 27.5% were renter-occupied. The homeowner vacancy rate was 2.3% and the rental vacancy rate was 17.7%.

=== 2000 census ===
As of the census of 2000, there were 9,647 people, 3,963 households, and 2,639 families residing in the county. The population density was 13 people per square mile (5.0 people/km^{2}). There were 4,633 housing units at an average density of 6 per square mile (2.3/km^{2}). The racial makeup of the county was 95.28% White, 0.98% Black or African American, 0.35% Native American, 0.55% Asian, 0.03% Pacific Islander, 1.73% from other races, and 1.07% from two or more races. 3.09% of the population were Hispanic or Latino of any race.

There were 3,963 households, out of which 30.00% had children under the age of 18 living with them, 56.70% were married couples living together, 7.50% had a female householder with no husband present, and 33.40% were non-families. 30.40% of all households were made up of individuals, and 14.60% had someone living alone who was 65 years of age or older. The average household size was 2.35 and the average family size was 2.93.

In the county, the population was spread out, with 24.50% under the age of 18, 9.40% from 18 to 24, 24.00% from 25 to 44, 22.80% from 45 to 64, and 19.20% who were 65 years of age or older. The median age was 40 years. For every 100 females there were 94.00 males. For every 100 females age 18 and over, there were 91.30 males.

The median income for a household in the county was $35,529, and the median income for a family was $43,156. Males had a median income of $31,138 versus $20,679 for females. The per capita income for the county was $17,906. About 6.70% of families and 9.40% of the population were below the poverty line, including 11.50% of those under age 18 and 8.90% of those age 65 or over.

== Government ==
=== Presidential elections ===
Presidential election results

United States presidential election results for Pratt County, Kansas
Year	Republican		Democratic		Third party(ies)	
Year	No.	%	No.	%	No.	%
1888	1,115	50.18%	652	29.34%	455	20.48%
1892	947	44.19%	0	0.00%	1,196	55.81%
1896	621	42.71%	820	56.40%	13	0.89%
1900	821	49.04%	816	48.75%	37	2.21%
1904	1,076	63.44%	421	24.82%	199	11.73%
1908	1,193	50.53%	1,027	43.50%	141	5.97%
1912	372	15.05%	947	38.32%	1,152	46.62%
1916	1,820	37.93%	2,607	54.34%	371	7.73%
1920	2,722	64.15%	1,433	33.77%	88	2.07%
1924	2,762	57.36%	1,205	25.03%	848	17.61%
1928	4,055	80.58%	934	18.56%	43	0.85%
1932	2,167	40.15%	3,109	57.61%	121	2.24%
1936	1,946	33.40%	3,871	66.43%	10	0.17%
1940	2,930	49.94%	2,870	48.92%	67	1.14%
1944	2,658	52.85%	2,334	46.41%	37	0.74%
1948	2,878	50.22%	2,751	48.00%	102	1.78%
1952	3,998	68.87%	1,743	30.03%	64	1.10%
1956	3,620	64.53%	1,956	34.87%	34	0.61%
1960	3,501	63.59%	1,968	35.74%	37	0.67%
1964	2,493	48.61%	2,594	50.58%	42	0.82%
1968	2,670	57.91%	1,490	32.31%	451	9.78%
1972	3,253	71.20%	1,214	26.57%	102	2.23%
1976	2,427	50.04%	2,307	47.57%	116	2.39%
1980	2,866	61.20%	1,369	29.23%	448	9.57%
1984	3,244	71.31%	1,255	27.59%	50	1.10%
1988	2,505	59.01%	1,651	38.89%	89	2.10%
1992	1,779	37.17%	1,466	30.63%	1,541	32.20%
1996	2,591	58.87%	1,367	31.06%	443	10.07%
2000	2,885	65.33%	1,314	29.76%	217	4.91%
2004	3,121	71.19%	1,200	27.37%	63	1.44%
2008	2,822	67.35%	1,294	30.88%	74	1.77%
2012	2,771	72.90%	980	25.78%	50	1.32%
2016	2,838	73.87%	771	20.07%	233	6.06%
2020	3,108	75.13%	933	22.55%	96	2.32%
2024	3,054	74.82%	954	23.37%	74	1.81%

=== Laws ===
Following amendment to the Kansas Constitution in 1986, Pratt County remained a prohibition, or "dry", county until 2000, when voters approved the sale of alcoholic liquor by the individual drink with a 30 percent food sales requirement.

== Education ==
=== Colleges ===
- Pratt Community College

=== Unified school districts ===
- Pratt USD 382
- Skyline USD 438

== Communities ==
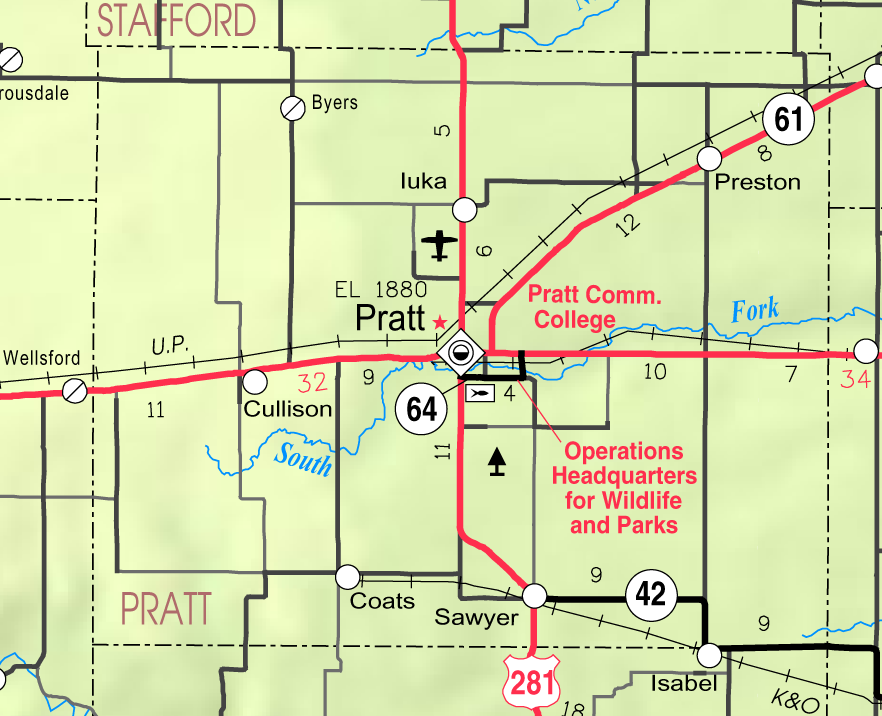
2005 map of Pratt County (legend)

List of townships / incorporated cities / unincorporated communities / extinct former communities within Pratt County.

=== Cities ===
- Byers
- Coats
- Cullison
- Iuka
- Pratt (county seat)
- Preston
- Sawyer

=== Unincorporated communities ===
- Cairo
- Croft
- Hopewell
- Natrona

=== Townships ===
Pratt County is divided into seven townships. The city of Pratt is considered governmentally independent and is excluded from the census figures for the townships. In the following table, the population center is the largest city (or cities) included in that township's population total, if it is of a significant size.

Sources: 2000 U.S. Gazetteer from the U.S. Census Bureau.
Township	FIPS	Population center	Population	Population density /km^{2} (/sq mi)	Land area km^{2} (sq mi)	Water area km^{2} (sq mi)	Water %	Geographic coordinates
Township No. 6	71223		565	1 (4)	381 (147)	1 (0)	0.17%	37°44′25″N 98°33′55″W
Township No. 7	71228		366	3 (7)	136 (52)	0 (0)	0.02%	37°45′20″N 98°43′49″W
Township No. 8	71233		181	1 (2)	197 (76)	0 (0)	0%	37°47′3″N 98°53′42″W
Township No. 9	71238		317	1 (2)	379 (146)	0 (0)	0.05%	37°37′59″N 98°54′7″W
Township No. 10	71242		191	1 (3)	188 (73)	0 (0)	0.01%	37°30′45″N 98°52′17″W
Township No. 11	71245		496	2 (5)	281 (109)	0 (0)	0.06%	37°30′44″N 98°38′21″W
Township No. 12	71248		961	3 (8)	321 (124)	1 (0)	0.19%	37°37′44″N 98°40′52″W

== See also ==
Community information for Kansas

- Kansas locations by per capita income
- List of counties in Kansas
- List of townships in Kansas
- List of cities in Kansas
- List of unincorporated communities in Kansas
- List of ghost towns in Kansas
