= Thornton Adobe Barn =

- U.S. National Register of Historic Places
- Location within Kansas Location within the United States
- Location: 1 mile (1.6 km) east and 1.25 miles (2.01 km) north of Isabel, Kansas
- Coordinates: 37.487910°N 98.537612°W
- Area: Less than one acre
- Built: 1942
- Built by: Thornton, James Edward
- Architectural style: Gambrel roofed adobe barn
- NRHP reference No.: 03001258
- Added to NRHP: December 10, 2003

The Thornton Adobe Barn near Isabel, Kansas, was built in 1942. It is a Gambrel roofed adobe dairy barn. It was listed on the National Register of Historic Places in 2003.

It is a 40 by 24 feet (12.2 m × 7.3 m) barn built by James Edward Thornton and other members of the Isabel community. Built during materials shortages of World War II, it utilized adobe bricks to make the lower story's walls and utilized recycled corrugated metal to make the exterior walls of the hayloft. The adobe walls were covered with stucco inside and out.
