= S.P. Gebhart House =

Historic house in Kansas, United States

- S. P. Gebhart House
- U.S. National Register of Historic Places
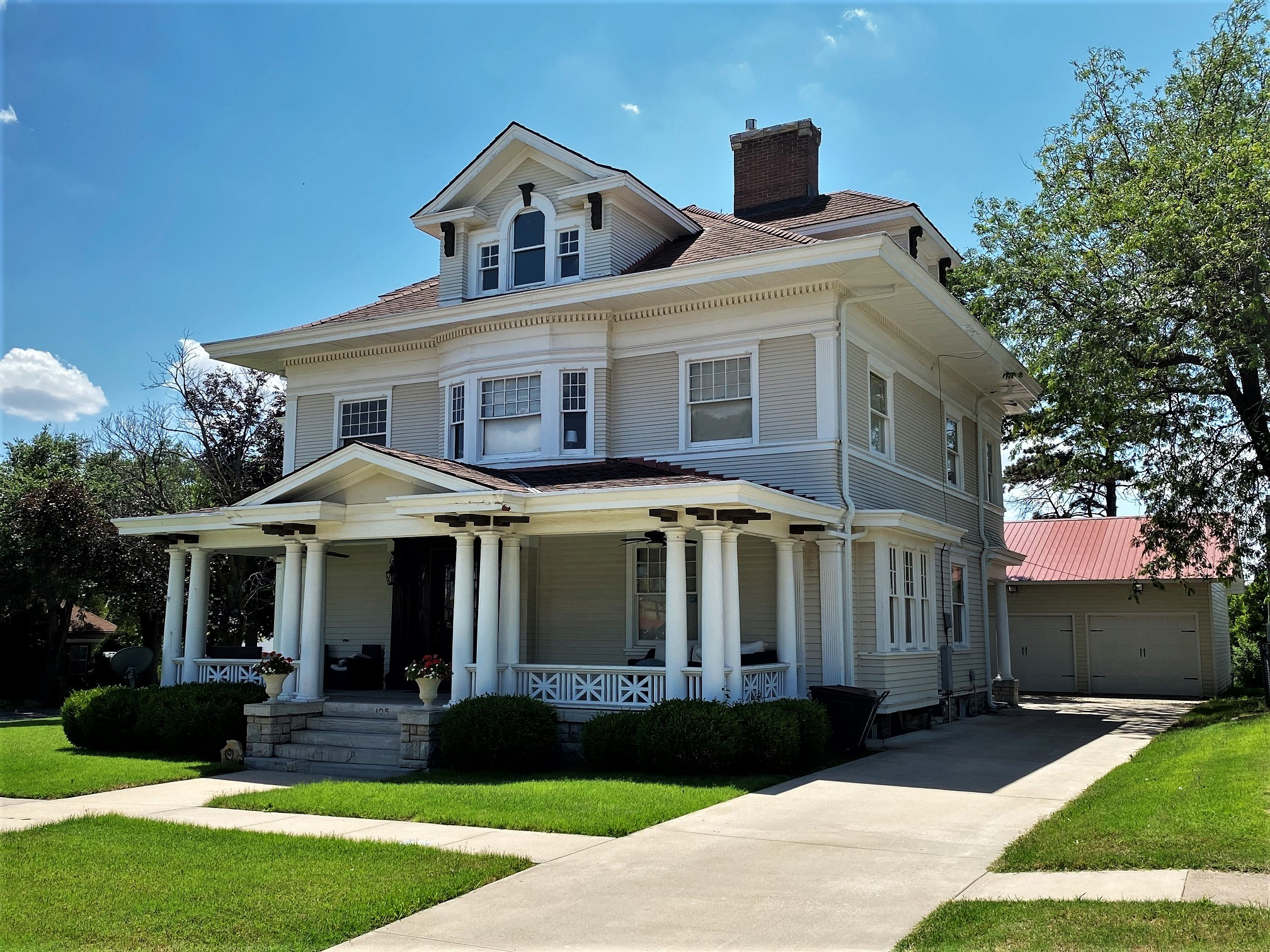

- Location within Kansas Location within the United States
- Location: 105 N. Iuka St. Pratt, Kansas
- Coordinates: 37°38′47″N 98°44′30″W
- Area: less than one acre
- Built: c.1907-10
- Built by: Duckworth, Harry Newton
- Architectural style: Colonial Revival
- NRHP reference No.: 87000074
- Added to NRHP: February 12, 1987

The S. P. Gebhart House, at 105 N. Iuka St. in Pratt, Kansas, is a foursquare house with Colonial Revival style that was built in c.1907-1910. It was designed and built by local contractor Harry Newton Duckworth. It was listed on the National Register of Historic Places in 1987.

== Background ==
It was home of Samuel P. Gebhart (c.1853-1935) editor and publisher of the Pratt Union newspaper and who long served on the City Council and once served as mayor. It was built by Duckworth, who built many local homes throughout southeastern Kansas, using windows and woodwork that were imported.

The house was deemed significant for its associations with Gebhart and with Duckworth, and for its architecture; it retained "an extraordinary high degree of architectural and structural integrity."
