= Pratt, Kansas =

City in Pratt County, Kansas

- City and county seat
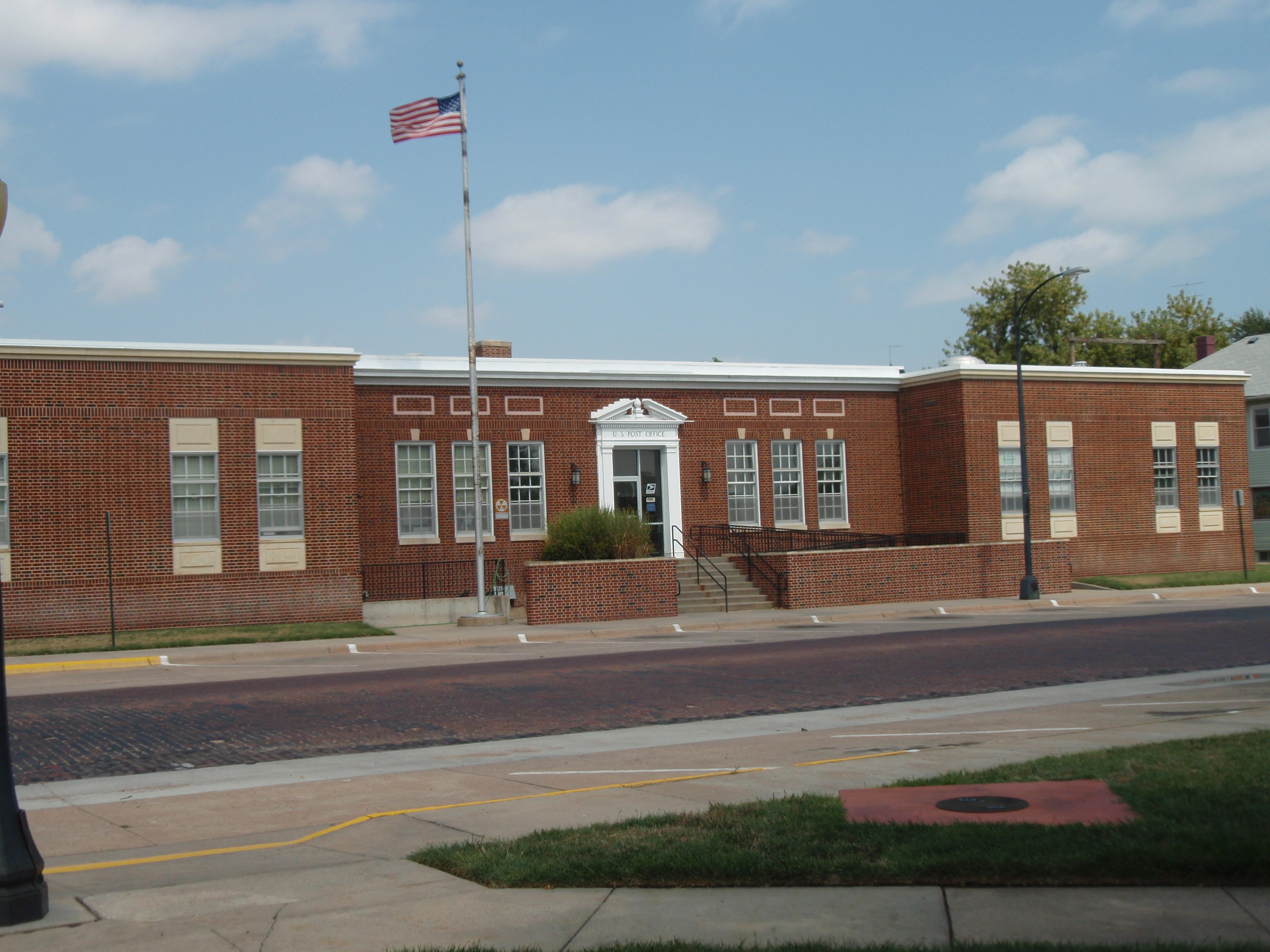
- U.S. Post Office (2009)

- Location within Pratt County and Kansas

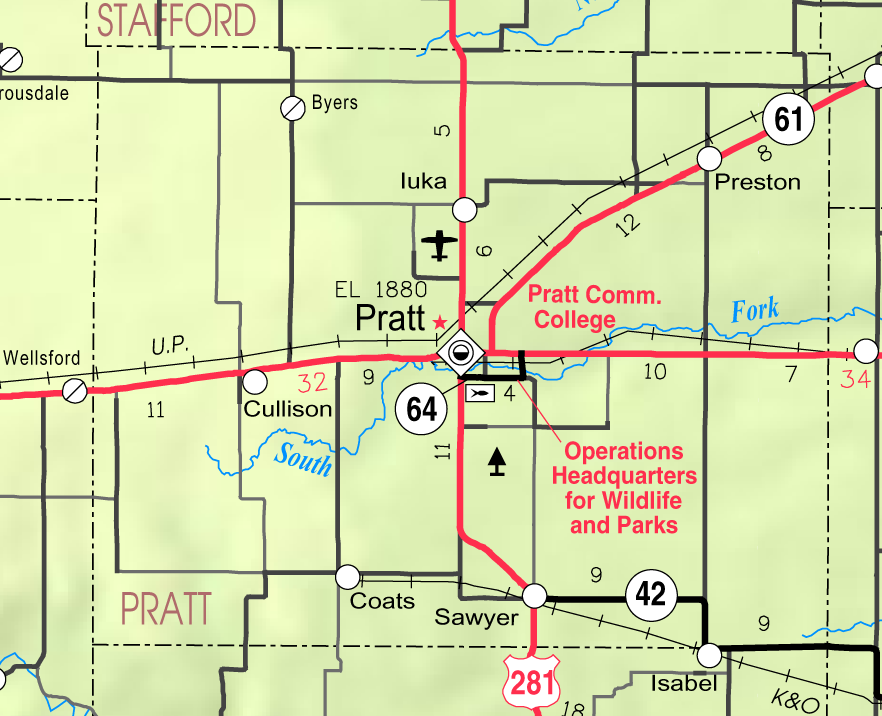
- KDOT map of Pratt County (legend)
- Coordinates: 37°39′1″N 98°44′17″W
- Country: United States
- State: Kansas
- County: Pratt
- Founded: 1884
- Incorporated: 1884
- Named for: Caleb Pratt

Government
  - Mayor: Kyle M. Farmer
  - City Manager: Regina Goff

Area
  - Total: 7.83 sq mi (20.29 km^{2})
  - Land: 7.71 sq mi (19.97 km^{2})
  - Water: 0.12 sq mi (0.32 km^{2})
- Elevation: 1,952 ft (595 m)

Population (2020)
  - Total: 6,603
  - Density: 856.4/sq mi (330.6/km^{2})
- Time zone: UTC-6 (CST)
  - Summer (DST): UTC-5 (CDT)
- ZIP Code: 67124
- Area code: 620
- FIPS code: 20-57625
- GNIS ID: 485645
- Website: cityofprattks.com

Pratt is a city in and the county seat of Pratt County, Kansas, United States. As of the 2020 census, the population of the city was 6,603. It is home to Pratt Community College.

== History ==
=== 19th century ===
Pratt was founded in 1884 and named after Caleb S. Pratt, a young Civil War officer from the Kansas Infantry, who was killed in the Battle of Wilson's Creek near Springfield, Missouri The first post office in Pratt was established in June 1884.

In 1887, the Chicago, Kansas and Nebraska Railway built a main line from Herington to Pratt. In 1888, this line was extended to Liberal. Later, it was extended to Tucumcari, New Mexico and El Paso, Texas. It foreclosed in 1891 and was taken over by Chicago, Rock Island and Pacific Railway, which shut down in 1980 and reorganized as St. Louis and Southwestern "Cotton Belt" Railroad, a subsidiary of Southern Pacific Railroad which merged in 1996 with Union Pacific. Most locals still refer to this railroad as the "Rock Island".

=== 20th century ===
Built in 1930, Hotel Roberts is the largest and most highly styled historic hotel in Pratt. Construction of the hotel was initiated by the Pratt Chamber of Commerce, which formed a committee in the late 1920s specifically to facilitate the construction of a large new hotel. Seen as a potentially valuable asset for the community, the hotel was financed in part through a public subscription campaign, and constructed on land provided by the Chamber. The Pratt Hotel Company owned and operated the hotel and hired Wichita architect Samuel S. Voigt and Kansas City contractor Webster L. Elson to design and build the building. Elson not only supervised the rapid construction of the "fire-proof" building, he was a founding member of the Pratt Hotel Company, and he retained an ownership interest in the property for many years. The community hospital was established on the eighth floor of the building in 1932, complete with an operating room and an x-ray machine. Architecturally, the building is significant as an early and sophisticated example of the Art Deco style in central Kansas. The hotel opened as the Hotel Roberts in 1930, and continued under that name until 1959, when it was purchased by Monte Parrish and renamed the Hotel Parrish. In January 2015 it was listed on the National and State Registers of Historic Places for its local significance in the areas of architecture and community planning and development.

During World War II, the nearby Pratt Army Airfield was the first base used for training Boeing B-29 Superfortress bomber crews and also served as a staging area for getting early aircraft combat-ready, in what became known as the Battle of Kansas.

The Miss Kansas Parade and Pageant are held here every summer.

The state headquarters of Kansas Department of Wildlife and Parks was constructed southeast of the town.

== Geography ==
According to the United States Census Bureau, the city has a total area of 7.49 square miles (19.40 km^{2}), of which 7.37 square miles (19.09 km^{2}) is land and 0.12 square miles (0.31 km^{2}) is water. Pratt is located approximately eighty miles west of Wichita.

=== Climate ===
According to the Köppen Climate Classification system, Pratt has a humid subtropical climate, abbreviated "Cfa" on climate maps. The hottest temperature recorded in Pratt was 115 °F (46.1 °C) on June 25, 1911, July 18, 1936, and August 12–13, 1936, while the coldest temperature recorded was −25 °F (−31.7 °C) on February 12, 1899.

Climate data for Pratt, Kansas, 1991–2020 normals, extremes 1895–present
Month	Jan	Feb	Mar	Apr	May	Jun	Jul	Aug	Sep	Oct	Nov	Dec	Year
Record high °F (°C)	80 (27)	89 (32)	98 (37)	106 (41)	107 (42)	115 (46)	115 (46)	115 (46)	111 (44)	98 (37)	89 (32)	85 (29)	115 (46)
Mean maximum °F (°C)	68.4 (20.2)	73.3 (22.9)	82.3 (27.9)	89.1 (31.7)	94.0 (34.4)	98.8 (37.1)	104.1 (40.1)	102.1 (38.9)	98.0 (36.7)	89.5 (31.9)	77.5 (25.3)	66.7 (19.3)	106.1 (41.2)
Mean daily maximum °F (°C)	43.1 (6.2)	47.7 (8.7)	57.5 (14.2)	66.7 (19.3)	76.5 (24.7)	86.7 (30.4)	91.5 (33.1)	89.7 (32.1)	81.9 (27.7)	69.8 (21.0)	55.9 (13.3)	44.6 (7.0)	67.6 (19.8)
Daily mean °F (°C)	31.1 (−0.5)	35.0 (1.7)	44.3 (6.8)	53.6 (12.0)	64.3 (17.9)	74.6 (23.7)	79.2 (26.2)	77.5 (25.3)	69.3 (20.7)	56.6 (13.7)	43.4 (6.3)	33.1 (0.6)	55.2 (12.9)
Mean daily minimum °F (°C)	19.1 (−7.2)	22.4 (−5.3)	31.1 (−0.5)	40.5 (4.7)	52.2 (11.2)	62.5 (16.9)	66.9 (19.4)	65.3 (18.5)	56.7 (13.7)	43.4 (6.3)	30.8 (−0.7)	21.6 (−5.8)	42.7 (5.9)
Mean minimum °F (°C)	3.6 (−15.8)	5.7 (−14.6)	13.1 (−10.5)	25.6 (−3.6)	36.1 (2.3)	50.0 (10.0)	56.6 (13.7)	55.2 (12.9)	41.0 (5.0)	27.1 (−2.7)	15.5 (−9.2)	5.6 (−14.7)	−1.6 (−18.7)
Record low °F (°C)	−16 (−27)	−25 (−32)	−12 (−24)	12 (−11)	20 (−7)	38 (3)	45 (7)	42 (6)	26 (−3)	12 (−11)	−2 (−19)	−20 (−29)	−25 (−32)
Average precipitation inches (mm)	0.64 (16)	0.99 (25)	1.97 (50)	2.67 (68)	3.80 (97)	4.10 (104)	3.25 (83)	3.36 (85)	2.32 (59)	2.23 (57)	1.18 (30)	1.11 (28)	27.62 (702)
Average snowfall inches (cm)	3.6 (9.1)	3.9 (9.9)	4.1 (10)	0.4 (1.0)	0.0 (0.0)	0.0 (0.0)	0.0 (0.0)	0.0 (0.0)	0.0 (0.0)	0.1 (0.25)	0.4 (1.0)	2.6 (6.6)	15.1 (37.85)
Average precipitation days (≥ 0.01 in)	2.3	3.2	4.1	6.0	7.3	7.2	5.8	6.1	4.5	4.6	3.2	2.9	57.2
Average snowy days (≥ 0.1 in)	1.5	1.5	0.8	0.1	0.0	0.0	0.0	0.0	0.0	0.1	0.3	1.0	5.3
Source 1: NOAA
Source 2: National Weather Service

== Demographics ==
Historical population
Census	Pop.	Note	%±
1890	1,418		—
1900	1,213		−14.5%
1910	3,302		172.2%
1920	5,183		57.0%
1930	6,322		22.0%
1940	6,591		4.3%
1950	7,523		14.1%
1960	8,156		8.4%
1970	6,736		−17.4%
1980	6,885		2.2%
1990	6,687		−2.9%
2000	6,570		−1.7%
2010	6,835		4.0%
2020	6,603		−3.4%
U.S. Decennial Census; 2010-2020

=== 2020 census ===
As of the 2020 census, Pratt had a population of 6,603, with 2,646 households and 1,545 families. The median age was 37.7 years. 23.7% of residents were under the age of 18 and 20.5% were 65 years of age or older. For every 100 females there were 97.8 males, and for every 100 females age 18 and over there were 95.0 males age 18 and over.

99.7% of residents lived in urban areas, while 0.3% lived in rural areas.

The population density was 856.2 people per square mile (330.6/km^{2}). There were 3,132 housing units at an average density of 406.1 per square mile (156.8/km^{2}). Of all housing units, 15.5% were vacant. The homeowner vacancy rate was 2.8% and the rental vacancy rate was 17.8%.

Of the 2,646 households, 28.6% had children under the age of 18 living in them. 42.9% were married-couple households, 21.3% were households with a male householder and no spouse or partner present, and 29.8% were households with a female householder and no spouse or partner present. About 37.6% of all households were made up of individuals, and 18.1% had someone living alone who was 65 years of age or older. The average household size was 2.3 and the average family size was 3.0.

Racial composition as of the 2020 census
Race	Number	Percent
White	5,697	86.3%
Black or African American	105	1.6%
American Indian and Alaska Native	56	0.8%
Asian	44	0.7%
Native Hawaiian and Other Pacific Islander	7	0.1%
Some other race	291	4.4%
Two or more races	403	6.1%
Hispanic or Latino (of any race)	632	9.6%

The percent of those with a bachelor's degree or higher was estimated to be 17.4% of the population.

The 2016–2020 5-year American Community Survey estimates show that the median household income was $52,243 (with a margin of error of +/- $6,294) and the median family income was $61,210 (+/- $8,138). Males had a median income of $30,817 (+/- $3,087) versus $17,577 (+/- $4,284) for females. The median income for those above 16 years old was $26,487 (+/- $1,386). Approximately, 6.6% of families and 12.5% of the population were below the poverty line, including 11.0% of those under the age of 18 and 12.1% of those ages 65 or over.

=== 2010 census ===
As of the census of 2010, there were 6,835 people, 2,837 households, and 1,713 families living in the city. The population density was 927.4 inhabitants per square mile (358.1/km^{2}). There were 3,201 housing units at an average density of 434.3 per square mile (167.7/km^{2}). The racial makeup of the city was 93.3% White, 1.5% African American, 0.6% Native American, 0.4% Asian, 2.3% from other races, and 2.0% from two or more races. Hispanic or Latino people of any race were 6.2% of the population.

There were 2,837 households, of which 27.7% had children under the age of 18 living with them, 46.4% were married couples living together, 10.2% had a female householder with no husband present, 3.8% had a male householder with no wife present, and 39.6% were non-families. 34.4% of all households were made up of individuals, and 16.7% had someone living alone who was 65 years of age or older. The average household size was 2.28 and the average family size was 2.93.

The median age in the city was 39 years. 22.4% of residents were under the age of 18; 12% were between the ages of 18 and 24; 21% were from 25 to 44; 25.2% were from 45 to 64; and 19.5% were 65 years of age or older. The gender makeup of the city was 48.8% male and 51.2% female.

== Education ==
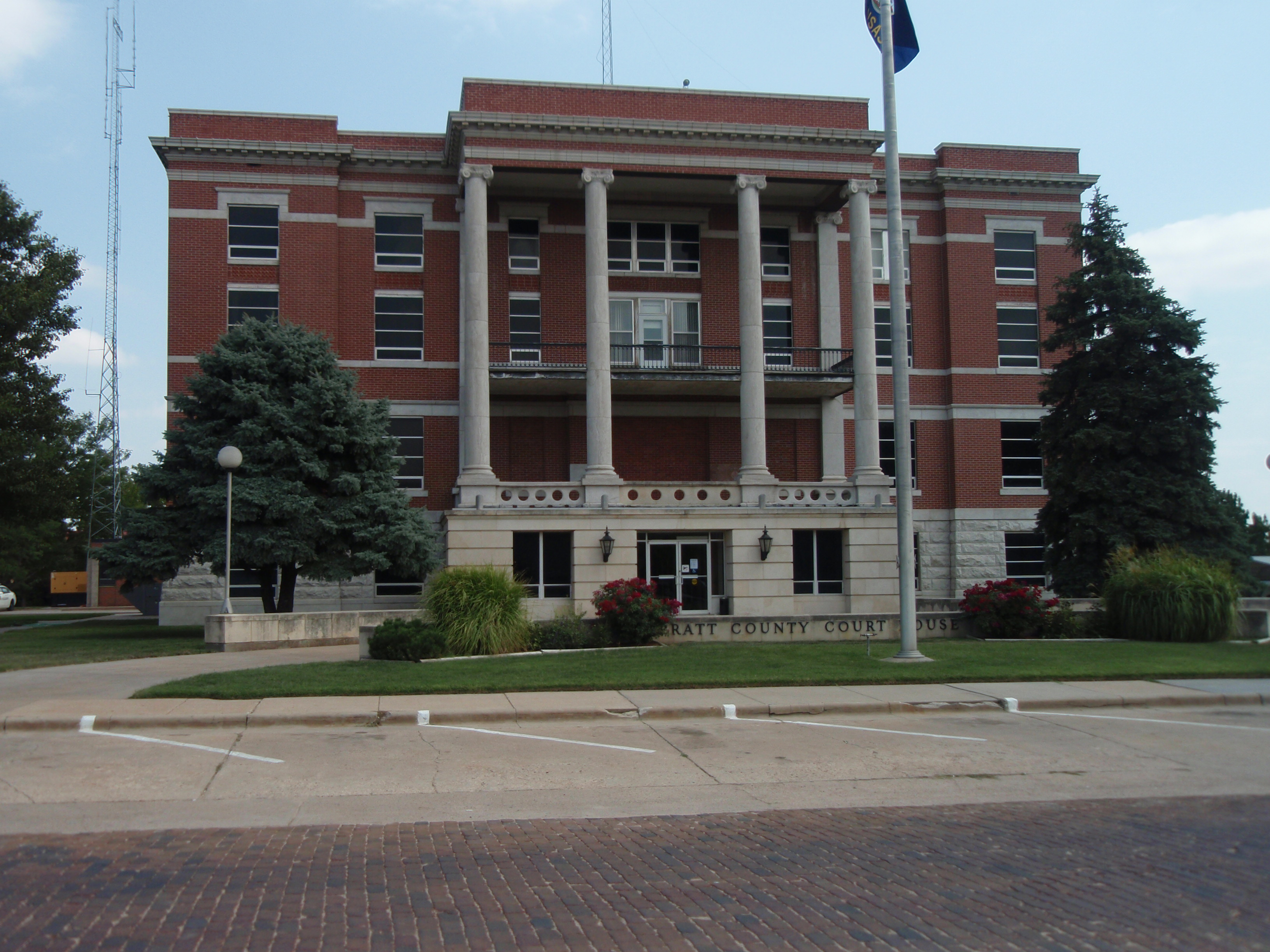
Pratt County Courthouse (2009)

=== Colleges ===
- Pratt Community College

=== Public schools ===
The community is served by Pratt USD 382 and Skyline USD 438 public school districts.

Pratt USD 382

- Pratt High School (9–12)
- Liberty Middle School (5–8)
- Southwest Elementary School (PreK–4)
- Haskins Elementary School & Bridges to Learning (K–4)

Skyline USD 438 (west of Pratt)

- Skyline High School (K–12)

=== Private schools ===
- Sacred Heart/Holy Child (PreK–5)
- Our Savior Lutheran Preschool

== Media ==
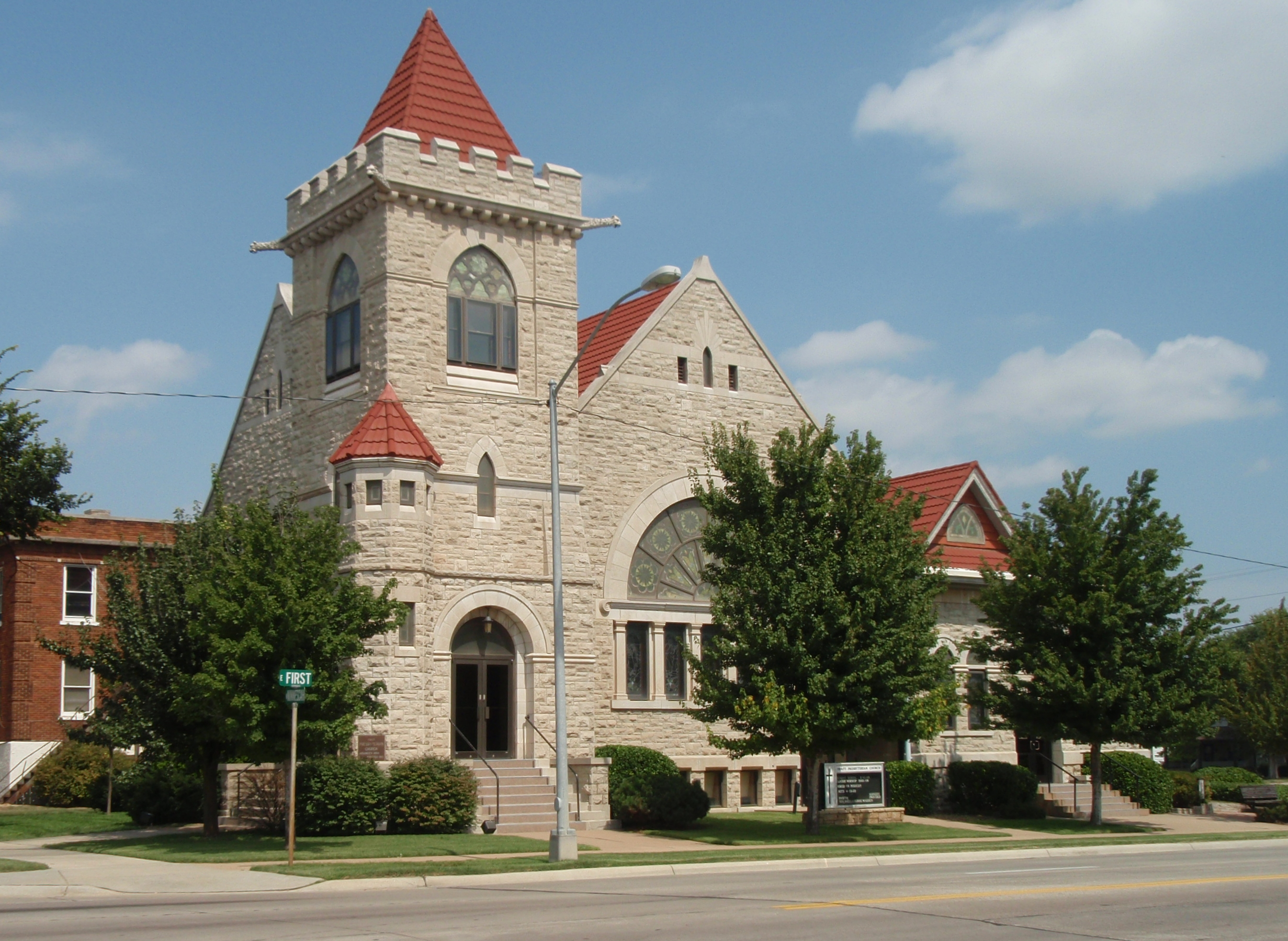
Pratt Presbyterian Church (2009)

=== Radio stations ===
- KHMY 93.1FM — Hot Adult Contemporary
- KMMM 1290AM — broadcasting a News, Sports, Information and Music format, owned by MURFIN MEDIA, INC., based in Wichita, Kansas.
- KQZQ 98.3FM — broadcasting a Country, Red Dirt Country format, owned by MURFIN MEDIA, INC., based in Wichita, Kansas.

=== Newspaper ===
- Tri County Tribune

== Infrastructure ==
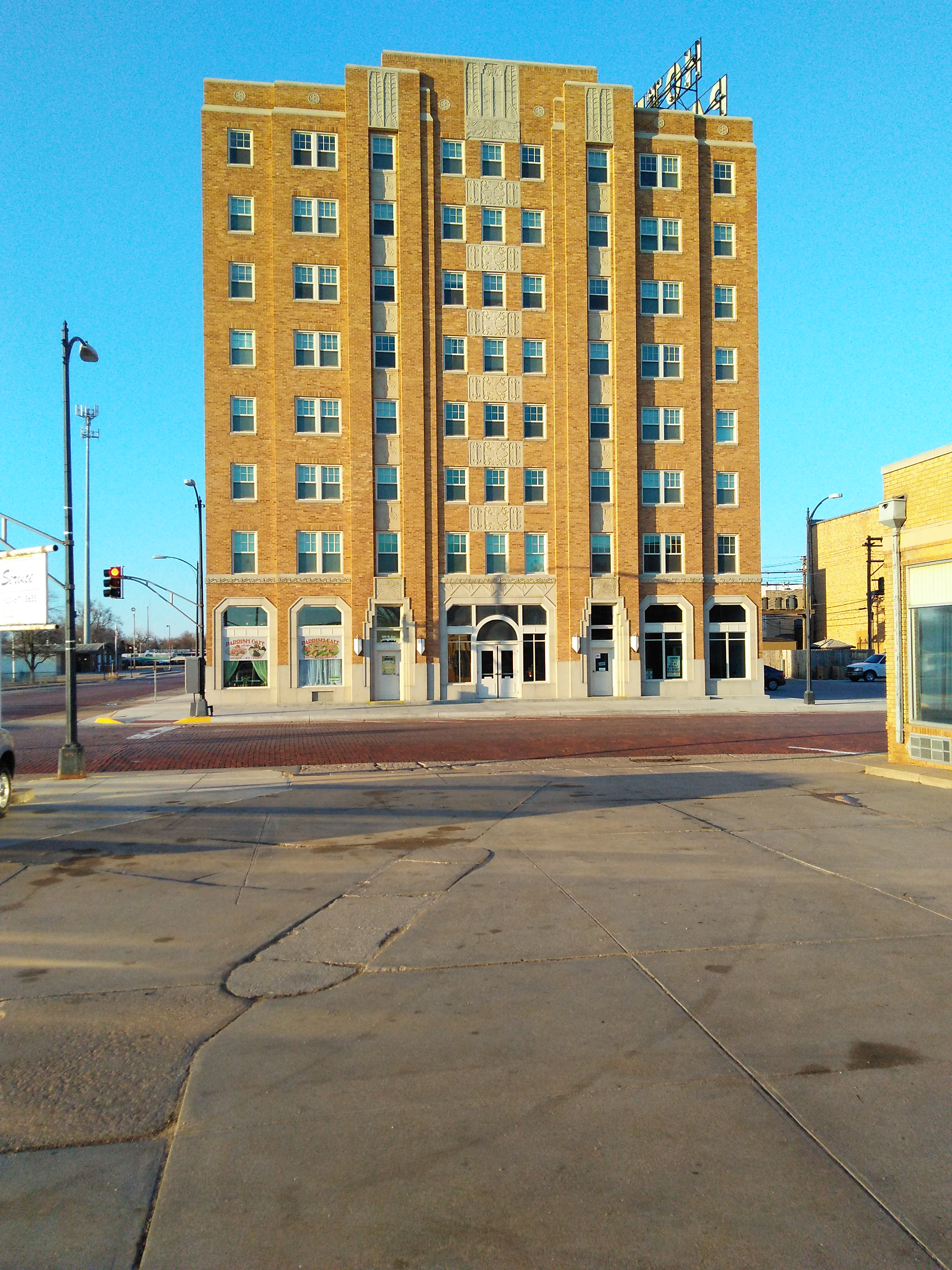
Parrish Hotel (2018)

=== Transportation ===
==== Highways ====
Pratt is served by U.S. Route 54, U.S. Route 400, and U.S. Route 281. It is also served by K-61.

==== Bus ====
Bus service is provided daily eastward to Wichita and westward to Pueblo, Colorado by BeeLine Express (subcontractor of Greyhound Lines).

==== Railways ====
The Atchison, Topeka and Santa Fe Railway formerly provided passenger rail service to Pratt on a line from Wichita. Dedicated passenger service was provided until at least 1926, while mixed trains continued until at least 1961.

== Notable people ==
- Bill Farmer, voice actor and comedian
- Earl Hancock Ellis, Marine Corps Intelligence officer and WWI veteran
- William Marriott, baseball player
- Vera Miles, actress
- John Redwine, physician and politician
- Pearl Farmer Richardson, clubwoman, United Nations promoter
- Charles Stokes, politician
- Brad Ziegler, relief pitcher for Major League Baseball
