= List of United States tornadoes in May 2025 =

United States tornadoes in May 2025
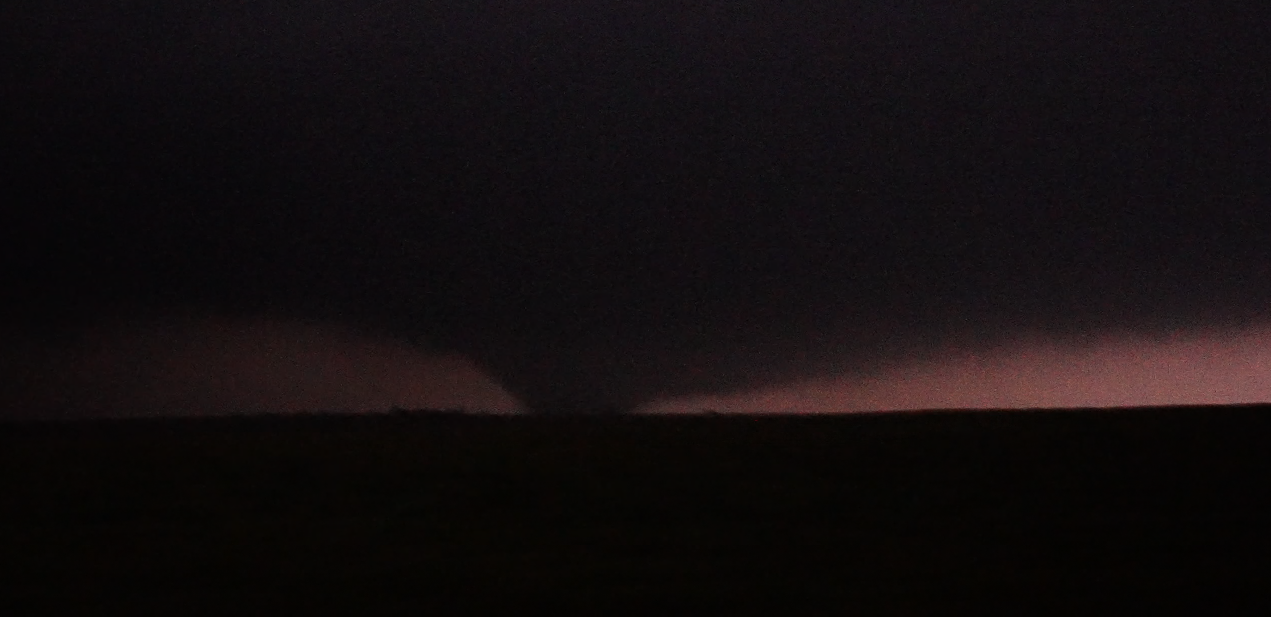
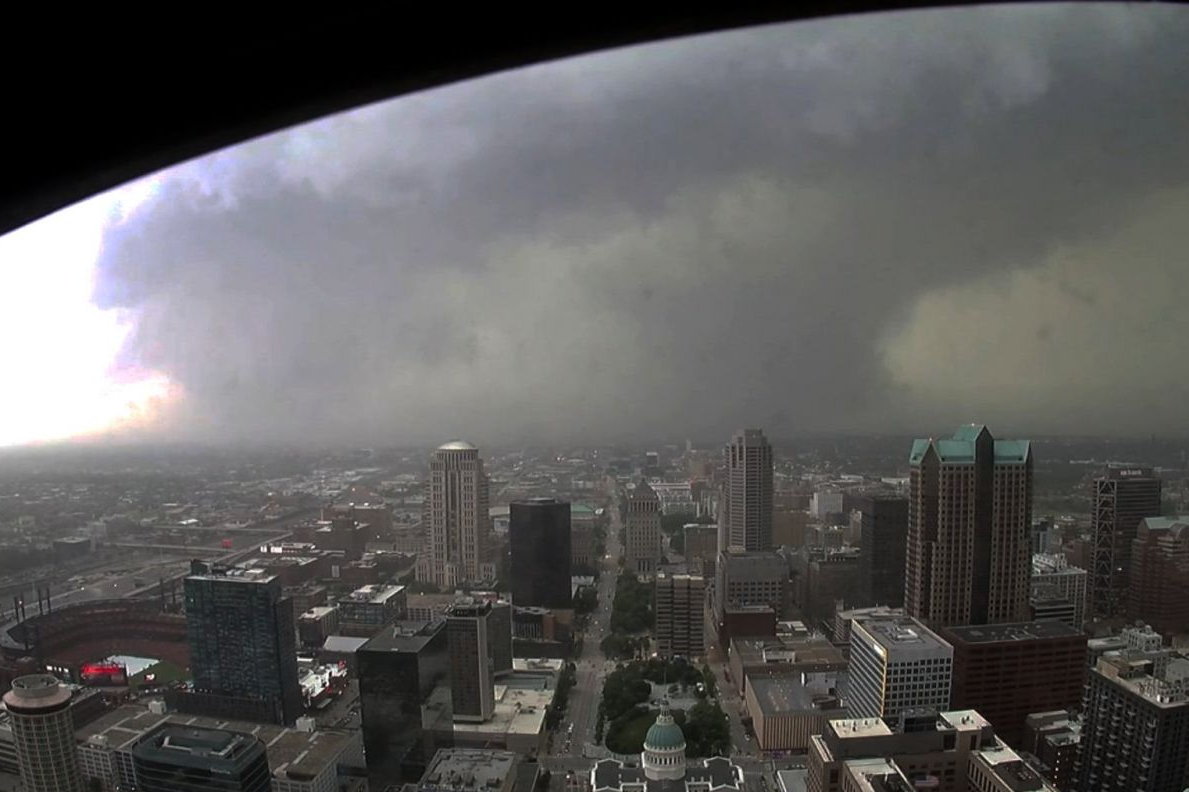
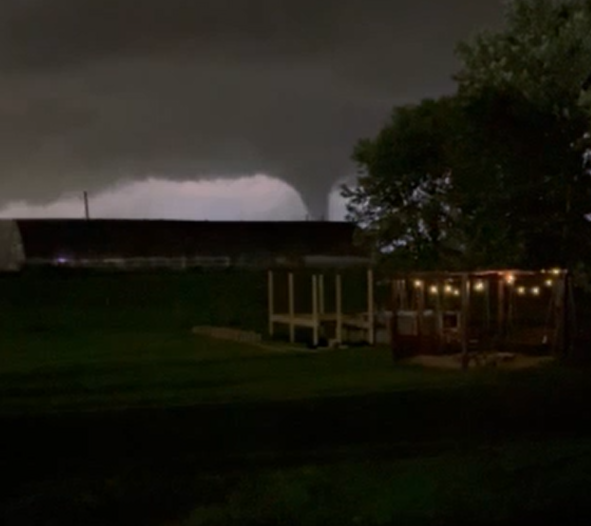
- Clockwise from top: A large EF3 tornado near Coldwater, Kansas on May 18, the first of a prolific tornado family; a deadly EF4 tornado as seen in Somerset, Kentucky; a large and destructive EF3 tornado in St. Louis, Missouri as seen from the Gateway Arch
- Timespan: May 1–30
- Maximum rated tornado: EF4 tornado: Marion, Illinois on May 16; London, Kentucky on May 16
- Tornadoes: 298
- Fatalities: 27
- Injuries: ~195

This page documents all tornadoes confirmed by various weather forecast offices of the National Weather Service in the United States in May 2025. Tornado counts are considered preliminary until final publication in the database of the National Centers for Environmental Information. Based on the 1991–2020 average, about 265 tornadoes occur in May. Activity spreads northward and westward in May, with the maxima moving into the Midwest and the Great Plains as the springtime jet stream patterns tend to occur farther north (while the South begins to see decreasing activity), while the potential for tornadic activity also increases in the Northeastern United States.

The first half of May was quite inactive with only limited tornado activity, with almost all of them being weak. Activity increased significantly around mid-month with two large tornado outbreaks producing numerous significant to violent tornadoes. Steady activity afterward resulted in an above average May with 298 tornadoes confirmed.

== May ==
Confirmed tornadoes by Enhanced Fujita rating
EFU	EF0	EF1	EF2	EF3	EF4	EF5	Total
51	85	119	28	13	2	0	298

=== May 1 event ===
List of confirmed tornadoes – Thursday, May 1, 2025 (Note: All dates are based on the local time zone where the tornado touched down; however, all times are in Coordinated Universal Time for consistency.)
EF#	Location	County / parish	State	Start coord.	Time (UTC)	Path length	Max. width
EF1	SW of Copperas Cove	Burnet	TX	31.0322°N 97.9984°W	21:29–21:54	3.1 mi (5.0 km)	880 yd (800 m)
EF1	A high-end EF1 tornado formed near the Burnet/Lampasas county line and moved southeast, causing significant damage along its path. It snapped tree trunks, damaged homes, and destroyed outbuildings. A home had its garage destroyed and a significant portion of its roof removed, while a multipurpose garage had its cinder block walls collapsed and metal roof caved in. At least four homes sustained major damage, primarily from wind impacts on the weakest points of the structures. One injury occurred when a delivery truck was flipped.						
EFU	NW of Briggs	Burnet	TX	30.9033°N 97.9535°W	22:16–22:30	0.55 mi (0.89 km)	1 yd (0.91 m)
EFU	A tornado formed and remained over open country.						

=== May 2 event ===
List of confirmed tornadoes – Friday, May 2, 2025
EF#	Location	County / parish	State	Start coord.	Time (UTC)	Path length	Max. width
EF0	W of Walters	Cotton	OK	34.342°N 98.453°W	06:53–06:54	0.63 mi (1.01 km)	30 yd (27 m)
EF0	This tornado damaged the roof of a mobile home and damaged an outbuilding near US 277.						
EF1	Northern Gainesville	Hall	GA	34.3341°N 83.8458°W	22:55–23:04	2.75 mi (4.43 km)	150 yd (140 m)
EF1	A tornado formed over the northern part of Lake Lanier, uprooting or snapping numerous trees around the lake.						
EF0	Marrero	Jefferson	LA	29.8792°N 90.1104°W	01:20–01:22	0.46 mi (0.74 km)	20 yd (18 m)
EF0	A brief tornado touched down on a playground and tracked northeast. It caused a shed to be flipped near the starting point and rolled another shed on its side. Minor roof damage was noted on a house and a few others along the track. A small shed was thrown northeast and debris was scattered with additional minor roof damage observed before the tornado dissipated.						

=== May 3 event ===
List of confirmed tornadoes – Saturday, May 3, 2025
EF#	Location	County / parish	State	Start coord.	Time (UTC)	Path length	Max. width
EF0	NNE of Frankfort	Franklin	KY	38.2889°N 84.8248°W	14:54–14:58	1 mi (1.6 km)	30 yd (27 m)
EF0	A weak tornado caused tree branch damage, roofing and siding damage to barns and residences, and uprooted trees along its path.						
EF1	NE of Pisgah to SSW of Rising Fawn, GA	Jackson, DeKalb	AL	34.7098°N 85.7943°W	20:49–21:09	13.49 mi (21.71 km)	80 yd (73 m)
EF1	A tornado began in a grove of trees, causing widespread tree damage around where it started. It continued east, snapping trees and causing minor damage to the Rosalie Fire Department and a few other structures before weakening and dissipating near the Alabama Welcome Center on I-59, just west of the GA state line.						
EF0	N of Salem	Lee	AL	32.6036°N 85.2891°W	00:21–00:26	3.76 mi (6.05 km)	175 yd (160 m)
EF0	A few small pine trees had the tops or limbs snapped off. Significant tree damage was reported northwest of a school with a fallen tree limb causing little damage to a home.						
EF0	SW of Porterdale	Newton	GA	33.539°N 84.0317°W	01:02–01:05	1.94 mi (3.12 km)	100 yd (91 m)
EF0	A couple of trees were downed.						
EF1	ESE of Shiloh to Woodland	Talbot	GA	32.7767°N 84.6532°W	01:14–01:24	5.83 mi (9.38 km)	200 yd (180 m)
EF1	The tornado initially downed multiple large oak trees and damaged a window and chimney. As the tornado moved across a largely wooded area, minor tree damage was found. Numerous oaks and pine trees were snapped and toppled.						
EF0	Southern Easley	Pickens	SC	34.8°N 82.614°W	01:56–02:03	2.68 mi (4.31 km)	25 yd (23 m)
EF0	Numerous large tree limbs were snapped and several pine trees were uprooted.						
EF0	Northern Culloden	Monroe	GA	32.8689°N 84.1049°W	02:00–02:04	2.47 mi (3.98 km)	175 yd (160 m)
EF0	This weak tornado touched down in Culloden and caused tree damage, snapped branches, and roof damage to a home and outbuilding. It continued east, snapping trees and causing additional roof and vehicle damage with minor tree damage observed along US 341 and SR 74.						

=== May 4 event ===
List of confirmed tornadoes – Sunday, May 4, 2025
EF#	Location	County / parish	State	Start coord.	Time (UTC)	Path length	Max. width
EF0	NE of Lowesville	Lincoln	NC	35.432°N 80.986°W	04:43–04:46	1.32 mi (2.12 km)	20 yd (18 m)
EF0	A tree was snapped and numerous tree limbs were broken.						
EF0	SSW of Four Oaks	Johnston	NC	35.4075°N 78.4653°W	04:59-05:00	0.14 mi (0.23 km)	30 yd (27 m)
EF0	A very brief tornado displaced a carport approximately 100 yards (91 m) downstream. An outbuilding sustained minor damage and several trees snapped or uprooted.						
EF0	NNE of Denver	Lancaster	PA	40.2503°N 76.115°W	17:33–17:34	0.1 mi (0.16 km)	10 yd (9.1 m)
EF0	Three sheds were destroyed and two houses sustained minor damage.						
EFU	NNW of State Hill	Berks	PA	40.4143°N 76.0926°W	18:11–18:12	0.4 mi (0.64 km)	30 yd (27 m)
EFU	A waterspout occurred over Blue Marsh Lake and caused no known damage.						
EF0	NW of Mohrsville to SE of Shoemakersville	Berks	PA	40.4815°N 75.9887°W	21:57–21:59	1.7 mi (2.7 km)	35 yd (32 m)
EF0	A landspout tornado developed in a rural area, causing some ground scouring and minor tree damage as it moved northeast. It then crossed PA 61, inflicting more weak damage to trees before dissipating.						

=== May 5 event ===
List of confirmed tornadoes – Monday, May 5, 2025
EF#	Location	County / parish	State	Start coord.	Time (UTC)	Path length	Max. width
EFU	SW of Jamesville	Martin	NC	35.79°N 76.92°W	21:18	0.25 mi (0.40 km)	50 yd (46 m)
EFU	A storm spotter caught a tornado on a drone as it briefly touched down over an open field.						
EFU	SW of Lovington	Lea	NM	32.8°N 103.48°W	23:20–23:21		
EFU	A landspout was recorded by a storm chaser.						
EFU	SE of Carlsbad	Eddy	NM	32.37°N 104.17°W	00:18–00:20		25 yd (23 m)
EFU	This landspout remained over open land.						

=== May 6 event ===
List of confirmed tornadoes – Tuesday, May 6, 2025
EF#	Location	County / parish	State	Start coord.	Time (UTC)	Path length	Max. width
EF0	SE of Cameron to NNE of Hanover	Milam	TX	30.8329°N 96.9448°W	17:15–17:26	9.27 mi (14.92 km)	250 yd (230 m)
EF0	A high-end EF0 tornado began southeast of Cameron, causing substantial tree damage and minor outbuilding damage. It moved northeast, producing intermittent tree damage and light outbuilding damage before dissipating in an open field east of FM 485.						
EF0	SE of Franklin	Robertson	TX	30.9956°N 96.4816°W	17:57–18:01	2.92 mi (4.70 km)	100 yd (91 m)
EF0	Some tree damage was noted, with several large tree limbs being broken off and dropped onto homes and outbuildings.						
EF1	Jewett	Leon	TX	31.3685°N 96.1555°W	18:11–18:15	3.49 mi (5.62 km)	480 yd (440 m)
EF1	A tornado touched down west of Jewett and tracked east-southeast through town before continuing several miles east. In Jewett, several trees were blown down and multiple homes sustained roof and minor exterior damage. The worst damage occurred along US 79, where an auto repair shop lost its roof, and east of the highway where many trees were snapped and uprooted. Tree damage extended farther east of town, with satellite imagery confirming the track beyond what the survey team could access.						
EF1	N of Corinth to S of Flo	Leon	TX	31.394°N 96.0143°W	18:20–18:29	5.98 mi (9.62 km)	100 yd (91 m)
EF1	A tornado touched down west of US 75. Several large trees were damaged near the highway, and additional tree damage occurred east of it. The tornado then damaged trees and a metal outbuilding before moving east over inaccessible land. It was tracked again near FM 831, where notable tree damage and snapped trunks were found. One manufactured home also sustained minor roof damage before the tornado dissipated just east of this area.						
EF0	Northern Frankston	Anderson	TX	32.053°N 95.5294°W	18:26–18:31	4.83 mi (7.77 km)	300 yd (270 m)
EF0	This high-end EF0 tornado began just west of Frankston, causing tree damage and roof damage to homes, with one tree falling through a home, injuring an occupant. The tornado continued east, producing scattered tree damage before dissipating near Lake Palestine.						
EF1	Bullard	Smith	TX	32.151°N 95.3517°W	18:41–18:48	4.93 mi (7.93 km)	600 yd (550 m)
EF1	A tornado began west of Bullard and moved east, causing extensive tree damage, including snapped trunks and uprooted trees, especially near the west side of a neighborhood in town. Several homes sustained low-end roof damage, and some residences were damaged by falling trees and limbs. The tornado continued across a large residential area, with many trees uprooted, but most homes remaining undamaged. The tornado lifted near a rural intersection after crossing several fields and roads.						
EF1	S of Bangor	Northampton	PA	40.84°N 75.2128°W	19:47–19:50	1.5 mi (2.4 km)	100 yd (91 m)
EF1	A tornado caused significant tree damage, uprooting or snapping several trees. It also caused roof and tile damage to buildings, including a public works barn and a historic commercial building.						
EFU	SSW of Roswell	Chaves	NM	33.2246°N 104.5856°W	20:05–20:20	1.24 mi (2.00 km)	15 yd (14 m)
EFU	A landspout was reported north of the Roswell Correctional Facility.						
EF1	SE of Bethany to Southwestern Shreveport	Caddo	LA	32.3149°N 93.9912°W	20:26–20:40	12.69 mi (20.42 km)	810 yd (740 m)
EF1	This high-end EF1 tornado began in a heavily wooded area, snapping and uprooting multiple trees, particularly near a church and cemetery. The tornado caused trees to fall on homes, significantly damaging them, and continued northeast, snapping more trees as it crossed LA 169 and several other roads. The tornado weakened as it moved through a neighborhood in Shreveport, damaging homes with fallen trees. Snapped large limbs were also noted across other areas, including near a high school and a dollar store. The tornado lifted just before reaching a Baptist church.						
EF0	ESE of Taylortown	Bossier	LA	32.352°N 93.4617°W	20:54–20:57	2.28 mi (3.67 km)	340 yd (310 m)
EF0	A weak tornado caused sporadic damage, downing large and small tree limbs. A few tree trunks were split as well before moving over Lake Bistineau and lifting.						
EF0	Prescott Valley	Yavapai	AZ	34.6344°N 112.3154°W	23:40–23:50	0.14 mi (0.23 km)	30 yd (27 m)
EF0	This landspout tornado impacted the Pronghorn Ranch Middle School, displacing roof shingles and lofting a garbage can 50 ft (15 m) to 100 ft (30 m) in the air.						
EF0	SW of Wilkinson	Wilkinson	MS	31.2°N 91.28°W	01:43–01:45	1.07 mi (1.72 km)	50 yd (46 m)
EF0	Using high-resolution satellite data, a tornado was noted to have caused damage to tree tops over inaccessible areas. Several large trees appeared to be uprooted as well along with a few of which were snapped.						

=== May 9 event ===
List of confirmed tornadoes – Friday, May 9, 2025
EF#	Location	County / parish	State	Start coord.	Time (UTC)	Path length	Max. width
EF0	SE of Venice	Plaquemines	LA	29.18°N 89.25°W	17:09–17:15	4.11 mi (6.61 km)	
EF0	A tornado tracked northeast, beginning near Pilottown, where it created a narrow swath of damaged marsh grass and affected a few small trees. The tornado continued across the Delta National Wildlife Refuge before becoming difficult to track.						

=== May 10 event ===
List of confirmed tornadoes – Saturday, May 10, 2025
EF#	Location	County / parish	State	Start coord.	Time (UTC)	Path length	Max. width
EF1	Warrington	Escambia	FL	30.3776°N 87.3085°W	11:15–11:17	0.61 mi (0.98 km)	200 yd (180 m)
EF1	This early-morning tornado developed within Warrington, damaging trees and homes. Some houses had windows blown out and a house porch was lifted.						
EF1	Pensacola Beach	Escambia	FL	30.3304°N 87.1406°W	11:21–11:22	0.37 mi (0.60 km)	150 yd (140 m)
EF1	A waterspout from the Gulf of Mexico made landfall onto a pier where it damaged volleyball nets and light poles. It then damaged a mini-golf course, depositing one of its buildings in the parking lot of a Hampton Inn. It then caused damage to another home patio before again becoming a waterspout and dissipating south of Oriole Beach.						
EF1	Eastern Destin	Okaloosa	FL	30.3825°N 86.4375°W	14:05–14:10	1.87 mi (3.01 km)	120 yd (110 m)
EF1	This waterspout made landfall in Destin at Henderson Beach State Park, causing damage as it tracked northward across the eastern portion of the city. The tornado knocked over a light pole at a restaurant, leaned a power pole at a retail store, and downed large tree limbs, uprooting several trees that fell onto cars. As it moved over a golf course, it uprooted trees and continued causing damage across a residential area. The tornado appeared to regain intensity before dissipating over Choctawhatchee Bay, confirmed by public video and radar signatures but dissipated before reaching land once more.						
EF1	Eucheeanna to SW of Ponce de Leon	Walton	FL	30.6237°N 86.082°W	15:22–15:35	8.03 mi (12.92 km)	400 yd (370 m)
EF1	This tornado began by snapping small hardwood limbs and uprooting trees as it moved northeast. It caused additional tree damage and minor roof damage to a barn before crossing a county highway and continuing northeast, snapping large tree limbs and uprooting more trees. The tornado reached I-10 where it caused softwood tree damage, briefly closing eastbound travel lanes. It then lifted just north of the interstate.						
EF2	NE of Gritney, FL to Noma, FL to SW of Fadette, AL	Holmes (FL), Geneva (AL)	FL, AL	30.8556°N 85.7843°W	16:08–16:48	15.48 mi (24.91 km)	600 yd (550 m)
EF2	A strong tornado touched down, uprooting hardwood trees and snapping large limbs. It intensified near an intersection where numerous tree trunks were snapped and softwood tree tops were broken. As the tornado continued, it uprooted more trees, snapped power poles, and caused minor roof damage to a manufactured home. It then moved across SR 2 south of Esto, tipping over a gas station covering, flipping a car and a trailer, and damaging a business and a home. The tornado continued northeast, causing additional tree damage and roof damage to homes before dissipating just north of a county road north of the Florida-Alabama state line.						

=== May 12 event ===
List of confirmed tornadoes – Monday, May 12, 2025
EF#	Location	County / parish	State	Start coord.	Time (UTC)	Path length	Max. width
EF1	Langley	Aiken	SC	33.51°N 81.83°W	07:24–07:26	1.34 mi (2.16 km)	250 yd (230 m)
EF1	This tornado caused extensive tree damage, uprooting numerous trees and snapping large branches. It also caused minor roof damage to homes and more significant damage to structures, including a fire department, with garage door failures, destroyed outbuildings, and metal roofing thrown several hundred yards. The tornado continued its path with additional tree damage before dissipating near US 1.						
EF1	Eastern Princeville to Eastern Tarboro	Edgecombe	NC	35.8839°N 77.5025°W	21:06–21:12	2.15 mi (3.46 km)	100 yd (91 m)
EF1	A farm outbuilding and several irrigation pivots were damaged. Several large trees were also snapped.						
EF0	Westlake to The Acreage	Palm Beach	FL	26.7483°N 80.3007°W	22:12–22:17	5.11 mi (8.22 km)	10 yd (9.1 m)
EF0	A high-end EF0 tornado destroyed a playhouse, tossed a trampoline, knocked over a fence, downed a couple of trees, and snapped large tree limbs.						
EF0	NE of Calhoun Falls	Abbeville	SC	34.121°N 82.552°W	23:31–23:38	1.69 mi (2.72 km)	20 yd (18 m)
EF0	Multiple large tree limbs were snapped and a few trees were uprooted.						
EFU	NE of Leesburg	Lake	FL	28.8368°N 81.8454°W	00:55–00:58	1.46 mi (2.35 km)	50 yd (46 m)
EFU	A waterspout was observed on Lake Griffin and remained over the lake.						

=== May 13 event ===
List of confirmed tornadoes – Tuesday, May 13, 2025
EF#	Location	County / parish	State	Start coord.	Time (UTC)	Path length	Max. width
EF1	N of Fountain to SE of Macclesfield	Edgecombe	NC	35.6926°N 77.6378°W	07:27–07:29	1.71 mi (2.75 km)	115 yd (105 m)
EF1	A mobile home was damaged and several trees were snapped.						
EF1	Pinetops to SE of Mercer	Edgecombe	NC	35.7886°N 77.6423°W	07:40–07:43	2.23 mi (3.59 km)	120 yd (110 m)
EF1	This high-end EF1 tornado began in Pinetops, destroying the porch of a home and snapping multiple trees. The tornado moved northwest across a field before impacting and damaging more structures and trees. It then became intermittent before damaging a house and some trees before lifting.						
EFU	ENE of Emden	Logan	IL	40.3101°N 89.44°W	20:49–20:50	0.09 mi (0.14 km)	10 yd (9.1 m)
EFU	A landspout was recorded just east of I-155. No damage was reported.						
EFU	N of Champaign	Champaign	IL	40.1502°N 88.2401°W	21:24–21:25	0.05 mi (0.080 km)	10 yd (9.1 m)
EFU	Multiple photos and videos showed a landspout tornado near a FedEx facility, remaining over a farm field.						
EF0	W of Toulon	Stark	IL	41.08°N 89.91°W	22:05–22:07	0.87 mi (1.40 km)	50 yd (46 m)
EF0	A tree was damaged.						
EFU	WSW of Winchester	Randolph	IN	40.167°N 85.043°W	22:08–22:10	0.26 mi (0.42 km)	50 yd (46 m)
EFU	A weak landspout was photographed near SR 32.						

=== May 14 event ===
List of confirmed tornadoes – Wednesday, May 14, 2025
EF#	Location	County / parish	State	Start coord.	Time (UTC)	Path length	Max. width
EFU	SSE of Sutherland	Lincoln	NE	41.0236°N 101.0716°W	23:51–23:52		
EFU	A landspout remained over open terrain.						
EFU	SSE of Tryon	McPherson	NE	41.4012°N 100.8968°W	23:53–23:54		
EFU	Multiple photographs of a landspout tornado were taken.						
EFU	S of Hershey	Lincoln	NE	41.0138°N 101.0021°W	00:01–00:02		
EFU	A landspout was reported over open land.						
EFU	W of Clifton	Iroquois	IL	40.9242°N 87.9413°W	00:06–00:08	0.15 mi (0.24 km)	25 yd (23 m)
EFU	This landspout was recorded just outside of Clifton in a farm field. No damage occurred.						
EFU	SSW of Hershey	Lincoln	NE	41.108°N 101.0239°W	00:08		
EFU	A hybrid landspout was photographed and recorded over open hills.						
EFU	SE of Sutherland	Lincoln	NE	41.0711°N 101.0536°W	00:15–00:34		
EFU	A nearly stationary hybrid landspout was observed by several storm chasers and civilians. It remained over open country for almost twenty minutes.						

=== May 15 event ===
List of confirmed tornadoes – Thursday, May 15, 2025
EF#	Location	County / parish	State	Start coord.	Time (UTC)	Path length	Max. width
EF0	NW of Gracelock to ESE of Big Bend City	Chippewa	MN	45.086°N 95.709°W	18:05–18:14	4.02 mi (6.47 km)	25 yd (23 m)
EF0	A weak tornado moved across a farm and some groves of trees, but minimal damage was noted.						
EF0	NW of Danvers	Swift	MN	45.303°N 95.798°W	18:28–18:29	0.52 mi (0.84 km)	40 yd (37 m)
EF0	A few large tree branches were downed.						
EF1	SE of Benson	Swift	MN	45.274°N 95.575°W	18:34–18:38	2.66 mi (4.28 km)	50 yd (46 m)
EF1	An outbuilding was heavily damaged, and trees were uprooted.						
EF0	N of Lake Henry to S of New Munich	Stearns	MN	45.525°N 94.776°W	19:43–19:48	2.77 mi (4.46 km)	50 yd (46 m)
EF0	Tree branches were snapped.						
EFU	NW of Amenia	Cass	ND	47.018°N 97.236°W	20:08–20:09	0.1 mi (0.16 km)	20 yd (18 m)
EFU	A brief tornado lofted some debris. No damage occurred.						
EF2	NE of Roberts to S of Erin Corner	St. Croix	WI	45.0201°N 92.4901°W	20:26–20:34	3.94 mi (6.34 km)	120 yd (110 m)
EF2	This strong tornado began by uprooting multiple trees near a property, then tracked north, snapping tree trunks along its path. As it shifted northeast, it destroyed a farm outbuilding, scattering debris along the rest of its track. The most significant damage occurred at a property where multiple trees were snapped and a silo was heavily damaged, including a caved-in side, a shifted base, and the top being removed. The tornado continued briefly before dissipating north of a nearby road.						
EF0	SSW of Rock Springs	Sauk	WI	43.4307°N 89.9453°W	21:05–21:06	0.08 mi (0.13 km)	20 yd (18 m)
EF0	Some tree branches were broken.						
EF0	SW of Wanchese	Dare	NC	35.8457°N 75.65°W	21:22–21:24	0.82 mi (1.32 km)	100 yd (91 m)
EF0	A brief, weak tornado on Roanoke Island caused scattered damage, including uprooted and snapped trees, tossed bleachers, shingle loss on a concessions building, and overturned outdoor equipment.						
EFU	NE of Hensel	Pembina	ND	48.71°N 97.62°W	21:28–21:29	0.1 mi (0.16 km)	20 yd (18 m)
EFU	A weak, uncondensed tornado was recorded. No known damage occurred.						
EFU	SW of Portage	Columbia	WI	43.5175°N 89.5009°W	21:42–21:43	1.18 mi (1.90 km)	20 yd (18 m)
EFU	Several people reported and recorded a tornado, but no damage was found.						
EF1	S of Christie	Clark	WI	44.62°N 90.6°W	21:47–21:48	0.85 mi (1.37 km)	100 yd (91 m)
EF1	A few large trees were snapped.						
EF0	NE of Christie to SSW of Loyal	Clark	WI	44.67°N 90.56°W	21:55–21:58	2.4 mi (3.9 km)	75 yd (69 m)
EF0	Trees were damaged, and a portion of a barn's roof was removed.						
EF1	E of Loyal	Clark	WI	44.72°N 90.49°W	22:08–22:12	2.4 mi (3.9 km)	100 yd (91 m)
EF1	A residence, trees, and powerlines were damaged.						
EFU	E of Crookston	Polk	MN	47.787°N 96.528°W	22:09–22:10	0.1 mi (0.16 km)	10 yd (9.1 m)
EFU	A dusty circulation with no funnel cloud was recorded crossing a road.						
EF2	W of Unity to Southeastern Colby	Clark, Marathon	WI	44.85°N 90.356°W	22:21–22:28	4.63 mi (7.45 km)	230 yd (210 m)
EF2	A strong tornado damaged farm outbuildings, trees, power poles, and a house had the majority of its roof removed. The tornado then passed through the southeastern part of Colby, damaging a house, several outbuildings, power poles, and a car dealership before dissipating east of the town.						
EF1	E of Astico to SW of Juneau	Dodge	WI	43.3276°N 88.861°W	22:32–22:42	6.62 mi (10.65 km)	100 yd (91 m)
EF1	Tree damage occurred.						
EF2	ESE of Leipsig to Northern Juneau to E of Horicon	Dodge	WI	43.377°N 88.7766°W	22:38–22:56	11.48 mi (18.48 km)	500 yd (460 m)
EF2	A strong tornado caused extensive damage along its path from southwest of Juneau, through the north side of downtown, and ending east of Horicon. The most intense destruction occurred in Juneau, where around ten structures experienced EF2-level damage. One person was injured when a roof was torn off and a tree crashed into their home. A care facility had windows blown out and lost the roof of one building, while a motel-style residential structure also lost its entire roof. An empty silo was buckled, and a cow was injured by flying debris. At a golf club near Horicon, approximately 165 trees were uprooted or heavily damaged, several golf carts were overturned or displaced, and the main building suffered major roof damage.						
EF0	NW of Rib Falls	Marathon	WI	44.963°N 89.92°W	22:41–22:50	2.5 mi (4.0 km)	65 yd (59 m)
EF0	Two outbuildings and some trees were damaged.						
EF1	N of Juneau to Southern Horicon	Dodge	WI	43.4323°N 88.7024°W	22:48–22:52	4.21 mi (6.78 km)	75 yd (69 m)
EF1	A tornado began on the north end of the Dodge County Airport, heavily damaging five airplane hangars by tearing off roofing and siding. All planes at the site were destroyed either by debris impact or by being flipped. The tornado then moved east and passed through the far southern edge of Horicon, causing additional damage near a park.						
EF0	W of Bancroft	Portage	WI	44.2547°N 89.6064°W	22:52–23:03	5.21 mi (8.38 km)	45 yd (41 m)
EF0	Trees were downed across a road.						
EF2	NE of Horicon to Mayville to NW of Theresa Station	Dodge	WI	43.4813°N 88.5983°W	22:57–23:08	8.28 mi (13.33 km)	300 yd (270 m)
EF2	This strong tornado began southwest of Mayville and quickly intensified as it moved into the southwestern part of town. A farmhouse lost part of its roof, and several farm sheds were damaged. In the industrial area, the Mayville Engineering Company sustained major damage when winds entered through a large garage door and caused the collapse of a north wall. The nearby Gleason Reel Corporation also suffered heavy damage, with the southern portion of the building destroyed. The tornado then moved through a neighborhood, causing further damage before crossing the town's main street and the East Branch Rock River. It continued through the eastern side of Mayville, damaging areas near the golf course, then moved northeast through rural areas, damaging trees, homes, and outbuildings before dissipating after passing just to the west of Theresa Station.						
EF1	N of Theresa Station	Dodge	WI	43.5392°N 88.4414°W	23:08–23:11	2.1 mi (3.4 km)	50 yd (46 m)
EF1	A tornado crossed I-41/US 41, damaging nearby trees.						
EF1	SW of Lomira	Dodge	WI	43.5606°N 88.479°W	23:09–23:10	1.5 mi (2.4 km)	50 yd (46 m)
EF1	A barn was destroyed.						
EF0	ESE of Zeeland to S of Hudsonville	Ottawa	MI	42.79°N 85.95°W	02:24–02:28	3.5 mi (5.6 km)	50 yd (46 m)
EF0	Multiple farm buildings and trees were damaged.						
EF1	SSE of Burnips to Southern Dorr	Allegan	MI	42.69°N 85.82°W	02:28–02:33	5.4 mi (8.7 km)	175 yd (160 m)
EF1	Numerous trees were snapped and/or uprooted.						
EF1	Martin	Allegan	MI	42.52°N 85.7°W	02:41–02:49	8.3 mi (13.4 km)	200 yd (180 m)
EF1	This tornado began by toppling a power pole, then caused significant damage at a campground near Schnable Lake, flipping trailers and damaging roofs with falling trees. It continued through Martin, where it inflicted its most severe structural damage before weakening and dissipating near the Allegan/Barry county line.						
EF1	ENE of Martin to SW of Hastings	Barry	MI	42.58°N 85.51°W	02:50–03:00	6.75 mi (10.86 km)	200 yd (180 m)
EF1	This tornado caused primarily tree damage, with several homes experiencing minor roof damage or being struck by falling trees. Multiple docks on Gun Lake were heavily damaged, including one with several sections torn off and thrown far into the water.						
EF1	NE of Caledonia to S of Saranac	Kent, Ionia	MI	42.8°N 85.47°W	02:51–03:08	14.5 mi (23.3 km)	100 yd (91 m)
EF1	A couple of houses sustained roof damage near Campbell Lake and tree damage occurred throughout the path.						
EF0	Galesburg to Battle Creek	Kalamazoo, Calhoun	MI	42.2951°N 85.407°W	02:59–03:11	10 mi (16 km)	200 yd (180 m)
EF0	Numerous structures had minor damage; others were damaged by falling trees. Tree damage was the main occurrence throughout this weak tornado's path.						
EF0	E of Level Park-Oak Park to S of Bellevue	Calhoun	MI	42.38°N 85.2°W	03:11–03:18	8.5 mi (13.7 km)	200 yd (180 m)
EF0	Multiple trees were damaged.						
EF1	NW of Charlotte to Lansing	Eaton, Ingham	MI	42.6°N 84.86°W	03:25–03:39	15.5 mi (24.9 km)	250 yd (230 m)
EF1	The storm removed parts of several houses' roofs, heavily damaged several outbuildings, and damaged warehouse buildings.						

=== May 16 event ===
List of confirmed tornadoes – Friday, May 16, 2025
EF#	Location	County / parish	State	Start coord.	Time (UTC)	Path length	Max. width
EF1	E of Stockbridge to W of Gregory	Livingston	MI	42.4541°N 84.1372°W	04:03–04:05	1.9 mi (3.1 km)	230 yd (210 m)
EF1	A tornado touched down north of M-106, uprooting a few trees and snapping large tree limbs. It damaged a shed roof near the highway, then moved northeast where it damaged more tree limbs and three roofs at a dairy farm. The tornado continued east-northeast, snapping hardwood trees before ending near the Lakeland Trail.						
EF0	Northern St. Charles	Saginaw	MI	43.297°N 84.1702°W	04:05–04:10	1.62 mi (2.61 km)	250 yd (230 m)
EF0	This tornado caused extensive tree damage along its path. It began southwest of a golf club, crossed the Bad River and into a park, then dissipated near a neighborhood north of the park.						
EF0	SE of Chesaning to N of New Lothrop	Saginaw	MI	43.1476°N 84.0511°W	04:11–04:14	3.36 mi (5.41 km)	160 yd (150 m)
EF0	This tornado began by damaging a couple of barns, blowing a garage off its foundation, and blowing out the door and wall of another garage. Several trees were uprooted and large limbs were snapped in the same area. As it continued, additional damage occurred to two more barns with roof damage, another garage with structural failure, and widespread tree damage including uproots and snapped limbs.						
EF0	NE of Atlas to N of Goodrich	Genesee	MI	42.9643°N 83.5289°W	04:35–04:38	1.24 mi (2.00 km)	100 yd (91 m)
EF0	A tornado damaged some trees.						
EF1	E of Bay to WNW of Caraway	Craighead	AR	35.7392°N 90.4925°W	12:46–12:53	7.11 mi (11.44 km)	150 yd (140 m)
EF1	A center-pivot irrigation system was overturned, several power poles were snapped, an outbuilding and a house had their roofs damaged, and minor tree damage occurred.						
EF1	Victory Lakes to Collings Lakes	Gloucester, Atlantic	NJ	39.65°N 75.01°W	16:42–16:53	8.09 mi (13.02 km)	300 yd (270 m)
EF1	This tornado uprooted a large hardwood tree and peeled siding from a home right when it formed. It intensified as it moved south-southeast, snapping several hardwood trees at their trunks. The tornado then followed a discontinuous southeast path, damaging a wood fence and tree branches near a residential area. It snapped a telephone pole before continuing into Collings Lakes, where it downed large branches, peeled metal roof sheeting from an outbuilding, and caused scattered tree damage before dissipating.						
EF1	ESE of Elk Creek to NNW of Clear Springs	Texas	MO	37.16°N 91.91°W	18:25–18:29	2.41 mi (3.88 km)	100 yd (91 m)
EF1	Numerous trees were uprooted or damaged.						
EF0	NW of Old Concord	Washington	PA	40.0144°N 80.359°W	18:52–18:53	0.51 mi (0.82 km)	75 yd (69 m)
EF0	A weak tornado downed several trees.						
EF3	Clayton, MO to northwestern St. Louis, MO to northern Granite City, IL	St. Louis (MO), City of St. Louis (MO), Madison (IL)	MO, IL	38.644°N 90.3468°W	19:39–19:53	12.29 mi (19.78 km)	3,168 yd (2,897 m)
EF3	4 deaths – See article on this tornado – At least 38 people were injured.						
EF1	Granite City to SW of Edwardsville	Madison	IL	38.703°N 90.153°W	19:50–20:05	11.64 mi (18.73 km)	
EF1	This tornado began as the St. Louis tornado was dissipating. It sporadically reached EF1 intensity before dissipating near Edwardsville.						
EF2	Des Arc	Iron	MO	37.275°N 90.6608°W	19:53–19:56	3.26 mi (5.25 km)	150 yd (140 m)
EF2	This strong tornado touched down along Route 49 near the Iron-Wayne county line and tracked northeast into Des Arc, causing minor damage to homes along the highway. It reached its peak intensity within Des Arc before weakening and dissipating just north of Route 143. This was the second tornado to strike Des Arc in 2025 with the first one being an EF3 tornado that moved along the same path through the town on March 14.						
EF3	Shawan to Crowder to SW of Porter	Stoddard, Scott	MO	36.9644°N 89.7786°W	20:54–21:15	16.1 mi (25.9 km)	200 yd (180 m)
EF3	2 deaths – See section on this tornado – Ten people were injured.						
EF0	W of Crowder	Scott	MO	36.96°N 89.72°W	20:59–21:01	0.64 mi (1.03 km)	100 yd (91 m)
EF0	A weak satellite tornado to the 2054 UTC EF3 tornado overturned an irrigation pivot and downed small tree limbs.						
EF2	E of Bufordville to WSW of Jackson	Cape Girardeau	MO	37.3649°N 89.7828°W	21:03–21:05	1.39 mi (2.24 km)	225 yd (206 m)
EF2	This strong tornado touched down east of Burfordville, majorly damaging the roof of a home. Further along its path, an outbuilding was heavily damaged and a mobile home was minorly damaged. Several trees were also uprooted along the track.						
EF1	Baltimore to Dundalk	City of Baltimore, Baltimore	MD	39.2796°N 76.6096°W	21:51–22:01	4.34 mi (6.98 km)	75 yd (69 m)
EF1	A high-end EF1 tornado touched down in Federal Hill Park in Baltimore where several trees were uprooted and large branches were snapped in a linear path toward the Patapsco River. It crossed the river and continued into Canton Waterfront Park, leaving a path of downed trees and branches through the shoreline area. In the Canton Crossing mall area, the tornado damaged a fitness facility by punching a hole in the wall, lifting part of the roof, and blowing it east-southeast. It then tracked east-southeast toward Dundalk, crossing I-895 and I-95 before hitting the Holabird Industrial Park where several warehouses suffered structural damage—mainly from wind entering large garage doors and lifting roofs. A metal and wood awning was damaged and two tractor-trailers were overturned at an Amazon facility where some debris was blown north. In northern Dundalk, the tornado caused major roof and siding damage to homes and apartments, including a large roof section torn from one row of apartments and thrown into another. Further east, a residential area west of MD 157 experienced extensive structural and tree damage, including snapped tree limbs and a home's roof being lofted onto a nearby roadway. The tornado continued into neighborhoods east of MD 157, where tree and utility pole damage was observed before dissipating near Stansbury Park.						
EF2	SE of Dugger to SSE of Worthington	Greene	IN	39.0455°N 87.2264°W	22:44–23:06	14.04 mi (22.60 km)	200 yd (180 m)
EF2	1 death – See section on this tornado – Three people were injured.						
EF1	SSE of Rhodesdale, MD to Northern Galestown, MD to S of Bethel, DE	Dorchester (MD), Sussex (DE)	MD, DE	38.55°N 75.83°W	22:52–23:06	11.3 mi (18.2 km)	600 yd (550 m)
EF1	A high-end EF1 tornado began near Rhodesdale, snapping and uprooting many trees with a clear convergent pattern. It briefly weakened before regaining strength, causing more tree damage and lifting a farm building off its foundation in the Galestown area, where the tornado reached its peak width and intensity. As it entered Delaware, it continued to snap and twist trees in multiple areas, including a park and residential neighborhood. The tornado eventually dissipated near Broad Creek.						
EF1	S of Confederate	Lyon	KY	36.9532°N 87.9972°W	22:54–22:56	0.83 mi (1.34 km)	210 yd (190 m)
EF1	Several trees were uprooted along KY 274, one farm outbuilding was destroyed and a house suffered roof damage.						
EF4	SSW of Crainville to Northern Hudgens to NNE of Creal Springs	Williamson	IL	37.6553°N 89.0945°W	23:15–23:32	16.28 mi (26.20 km)	900 yd (820 m)
EF4	See article on this tornado – 7 people were injured.						
EF1	NE of Bloomfield	Greene	IN	39.0829°N 86.8565°W	23:15–23:19	1.82 mi (2.93 km)	100 yd (91 m)
EF1	Widespread tree damage was observed using high-resolution satellite imagery, confirming this tornado.						
EF2	Elwren to Clear Creek to Grandview Lake	Monroe, Brown, Bartholomew	IN	39.106°N 86.6783°W	23:27–00:11	35.27 mi (56.76 km)	350 yd (320 m)
EF2	This long-tracked, strong tornado began in west-central Monroe County, damaging many trees and causing minor structural impacts before severely damaging a large horse barn, removing its roof and two walls. It continued into the Clear Creek area, where it caused minor home damage and tore the roof off a poorly anchored post office, snapping numerous trees nearby. As it moved east, it caused near-continuous EF0 to EF1 damage until intensifying near an old state road, where it destroyed unanchored outbuildings, tossed debris and a metal unit, and caused substantial roof damage to rental units while rolling several cars. The tornado then reached EF2 intensity at an older motel, removing its roof and walls and snapping trees behind it. As it crossed into Brown County, the tornado remained on the ground through dense forested terrain, occasionally hitting structures, and widened to nearly a quarter mile. EF2 damage was found in eastern Brown County, especially in Brown County State Park, where it intensified and widened to its peak width, snapping and uprooting nearly every tree in a long continuous swath through a campground and over ridges and valleys. The tornado then narrowed, with remaining damage mostly to trees and some weak structural impacts. It entered western Bartholomew County, causing tree damage and reaching EF1 intensity in northern parts of Grandview Lake before weakening and dissipating just east of the lake.						
EF1	NE of Annapolis, IL to York, IL to SW of Riverview	Crawford (IL), Clark (IL), Sullivan (IN)	IL, IN	39.1643°N 87.8026°W	23:38–23:55	10.68 mi (17.19 km)	100 yd (91 m)
EF1	This tornado started by causing minor tree damage as it moved east-northeast into southeastern Clark County. It continued into York, where it damaged multiple trees and a farm outbuilding. The tornado then crossed the Wabash River into Indiana before dissipating.						
EF1	S of Lambert	Scott	MO	37.0602°N 89.5621°W	23:40–23:42	1.31 mi (2.11 km)	100 yd (91 m)
EF1	A high-end EF1 caused total destruction to a detached garage/barn, damaged several farm buildings, and snapped or uprooted multiple trees before lifting just west of I-55.						
EF2	N of Allegre	Christian, Todd	KY	36.9465°N 87.3008°W	23:42–23:49	5.99 mi (9.64 km)	200 yd (180 m)
EF2	This significant tornado began with minor damage to a couple of homes before moving east into Todd county. It caused the most severe damage when it destroyed several chicken houses and swept away a mobile home. Along its path, dozens of trees were snapped or uprooted and a few outbuildings sustained damage before the tornado lifted west of KY 181.						
EF1	NE of Mitchellsville to N of Eagle	Saline	IL	37.6675°N 88.5131°W	23:48–23:54	6.75 mi (10.86 km)	75 yd (69 m)
EF1	Numerous trees were damaged.						
EF2	SE of Eagle to SW of Old Shawneetown	Saline, Gallatin	IL	37.6417°N 88.3804°W	23:56–00:05	9.93 mi (15.98 km)	250 yd (230 m)
EF2	This strong tornado began in far southeast Saline county, producing its most severe damage early in the path by snapping numerous trees and breaking wooden power poles. As it moved east into southern Gallatin county, it weakened while crossing IL 1 near Gibsonia. The tornado dissipated just before reaching the Ohio River.						
EF0	S of Brunerstown	Putnam	IN	39.6069°N 87.0044°W	23:58–00:00	0.43 mi (0.69 km)	20 yd (18 m)
EF0	Several trees were downed or uprooted.						
EF1	W of Sunman to Spades to SW of St. Peter	Ripley, Dearborn, Franklin	IN	39.25°N 85.13°W	00:02–00:11	6.33 mi (10.19 km)	250 yd (230 m)
EF1	This tornado initially broke large limbs from both softwood and hardwood trees. It continued northward, downing numerous trees at several properties and causing minor siding and roof shingle damage to at least one home. A more concentrated area of damage included uprooted and snapped large, healthy trees. The most severe damage occurred when a well-built outbuilding experienced a total collapse of its exterior walls. Tree damage persisted across nearby fields, and the tornado's final impact point included uplifted roofing on a barn and minor siding and shingle damage to a nearby home before it dissipated.						
EF3	WSW of Morganfield to S of Breckinridge Center	Union	KY	37.6597°N 88.0484°W	00:16–00:29	9.88 mi (15.90 km)	500 yd (460 m)
EF3	An intense tornado scoured agricultural fields before intensifying as it moved east across areas to the south of Morganfield. Several homes suffered severe to near-catastrophic damage with roofs and most exterior walls removed. The tornado weakened after crossing KY 56 and lifted in the eastern part of Union County. Four minor injuries occurred.						
EF2	NE of Newstead to Southern Hopkinsville	Christian	KY	36.8144°N 87.6108°W	02:26–02:34	10.03 mi (16.14 km)	225 yd (206 m)
EF2	This strong tornado touched down north of I-24, causing shingle damage to a house and significant damage to a couple of barns. As it moved east, it uprooted or snapped dozens of trees. Several homes sustained roof damage, particularly in residential areas along its path. The tornado snapped about half a dozen power poles as it crossed US 41 Alt.. Before lifting, it caused additional damage to a house and outbuildings near the end of its track.						
EF4	Whittle to Southern Somerset to Southern London	Russell, Pulaski, Laurel	KY	37.0159°N 85.0325°W	02:27–03:56	60.08 mi (96.69 km)	1,700 yd (1,600 m)
EF4	19 deaths – See article on this tornado – 108 people were injured.						
EF1	N of Russellville	Logan	KY	36.8719°N 86.911°W	02:55–02:57	2.57 mi (4.14 km)	75 yd (69 m)
EF1	This tornado touched down just east of US 431, causing minor tree damage near a residence. As it moved rapidly eastward, it caused weak damage to an outdoor shed, scattering debris into a nearby field. The tornado strengthened to EF1 near a small metal garage, lifting its roof, and continued to damage rooftops and outbuildings along its path. Its most significant damage occurred as it collapsed the exterior walls of a large farm building and shifted other nearby structures. After crossing a creek, the tornado weakened, producing additional tree damage before crossing US 68 and lifting shortly afterward in a field.						

=== May 17 event ===
List of confirmed tornadoes – Saturday, May 17, 2025
EF#	Location	County / parish	State	Start coord.	Time (UTC)	Path length	Max. width
EF1	SSW of Paoli	Garvin	OK	34.779°N 97.296°W	22:28–22:34	1.82 mi (2.93 km)	40 yd (37 m)
EF1	A tornado crossed I-35, passing the bridge and crossing the Washita River where it was intercepted by storm chasers.						

=== May 18 event ===
List of confirmed tornadoes – Sunday, May 18, 2025
EF#	Location	County / parish	State	Start coord.	Time (UTC)	Path length	Max. width
EF1	Valley Hill to S of McCarley	Carroll	MS	33.5062°N 90.0642°W	08:08–08:29	14.4 mi (23.2 km)	1,100 yd (1,000 m)
EF1	A tornado touched down along US 82 north of the Greenwood–Leflore Airport and tracked east-southeast. Thousands of hardwood and softwood trees were snapped or uprooted, with several falling onto homes, fences, and power lines, leading to widespread outages. Several single-family homes sustained roof damage, and multiple sheds and outbuildings were either destroyed or heavily damaged along the path.						
EF2	NE of Parker	Elbert, Arapahoe	CO	39.5584°N 104.6226°W	19:07–19:12	0.94 mi (1.51 km)	50 yd (46 m)
EF2	This EF2 tornado caused damage to houses and buildings.						
EF1	SW of Bennett	Arapahoe	CO	39.6614°N 104.5519°W	19:23–19:32	2.53 mi (4.07 km)	75 yd (69 m)
EF1	This brief tornado caused roof damage to barns and snapped tree branches.						
EF2	W of Bennett	Arapahoe, Adams	CO	39.7191°N 104.4948°W	19:30–19:46	5.09 mi (8.19 km)	200 yd (180 m)
EF2	This tornado destroyed multiple solar panels and lifted and rolled a pickup truck over 100 yards.						
EF2	NNE of Bennett	Adams	CO	39.7838°N 104.4074°W	19:40–19:55	4.62 mi (7.44 km)	400 yd (370 m)
EF2	This strong tornado caused damage to mobile homes and trees and completely destroyed a barn.						
EFU	SW of Clyde	Callahan	TX	32.3233°N 99.5477°W	22:03–22:10	2.98 mi (4.80 km)	50 yd (46 m)
EFU	A tornado occurred near Lake Clyde.						
EFU	N of Kirk	Yuma	CO	39.6404°N 102.59°W	22:05	0.01 mi (0.016 km)	15 yd (14 m)
EFU	A landspout was photographed.						
EF2	WSW of St. Francis	Cheyenne	KS	39.6978°N 101.9496°W	22:12–22:19	3.94 mi (6.34 km)	200 yd (180 m)
EF2	A tornado formed south of a farmstead, causing minor impacts before moving north-northwest toward US 36. Along its path, it broke power poles, uprooted a large cottonwood tree, and twisted a well-anchored antenna. At another farmstead, the tornado removed the roof and doors from a metal building, displaced a couple of grain bins, and leveled a wooden shed, though it turned away from the house. It continued north through a windbreak before dissipating short of the highway.						
EFU	N of Kanorado	Sherman	KS	39.4394°N 102.0403°W	22:15–22:16	0.07 mi (0.11 km)	50 yd (46 m)
EFU	An off-duty NWS employee reported a brief tornado.						
EF2	NE of Albany	Shackelford	TX	32.7925°N 99.2269°W	22:19–22:24	0.8 mi (1.3 km)	150 yd (140 m)
EF2	A brief but strong tornado damaged several utility poles and trees.						
EF1	S of Higgins, TX	Hemphill (TX), Ellis (OK)	TX, OK	36.0089°N 100.0049°W	22:21–22:27	1.61 mi (2.59 km)	75 yd (69 m)
EF1	A tornado began on the eastern edge of Hemphill County and quickly intensified, damaging several buildings and a home, including partial uplift of the roof deck and damage to siding and shed doors. Several trees were uprooted in the home's yard and a cattle wind break was partially torn from the ground. After crossing into Oklahoma, the tornado snapped tree limbs and caused minor damage before lifting in an open field.						
EF2	N of Scott City	Scott, Logan	KS	38.65°N 100.95°W	22:35–23:04	11.04 mi (17.77 km)	460 yd (420 m)
EF2	This strong tornado began in northern Scott County, damaging trees and completely destroying an outbuilding near the Scott Wildlife Area before continuing north into Logan County. There, it destroyed an oil battery near Little Jerusalem Badlands State Park and damaged items bolted into concrete at the park entrance.						
EF3	WSW of Arnett	Ellis	OK	36.09°N 99.865°W	22:41–22:56	6 mi (9.7 km)	50 yd (46 m)
EF3	An intense tornado began west of Arnett, breaking power poles and damaging trees before moving east-northeast through open country. Although much of the path lacked structures, surveys and drone imagery confirmed a continuous track. Severe tree damage occurred south of local road, where trees were partially debarked and large limbs stripped, leading to the EF3 rating. Near the western edge of Arnett, the tornado displaced a large shipping container by 175 ft (53 m) and caused additional extensive tree damage. It then turned northwest and dissipated just west of the city near US 60.						
EF2	Modoc to NW of Scott City	Scott	KS	38.48°N 101.1°W	22:43–22:55	7.36 mi (11.84 km)	150 yd (140 m)
EF2	A tornado began southwest of Modoc just south of K-96, snapping power poles along the highway. As it tracked northeast, it toppled train cars west of town and damaged a mobile home on the north side of Modoc by ripping off its roof. Moving into open fields, it caused sporadic damage to power lines, a home, and pivot irrigation systems before dissipating.						
EF0	S of Arnett	Ellis	OK	36.099°N 99.778°W	22:56	0.2 mi (0.32 km)	10 yd (9.1 m)
EF0	This anticyclonic, high-end EF0 tornado snapped tree branches, tore the roof off a barn, and overturned farming equipment.						
EF1	NW of Arnett	Ellis	OK	36.147°N 99.787°W	22:58–23:06	3.5 mi (5.6 km)	50 yd (46 m)
EF1	Trees and an oil field building were damaged.						
EFU	NNW of Scott City	Scott	KS	38.6559°N 100.9574°W	23:10	0.25 mi (0.40 km)	25 yd (23 m)
EFU	A brief tornado was observed but no damage was found.						
EF3	W of Gove City to Grinnell	Gove, Sheridan	KS	38.961°N 100.717°W	23:32–00:02	13.33 mi (21.45 km)	416 yd (380 m)
EF3	See section on this tornado						
EF0	NNW of Eastland	Eastland	TX	32.4797°N 98.8565°W	23:47–23:54	3.28 mi (5.28 km)	200 yd (180 m)
EF0	Large tree branches were snapped.						
EF0	WSW of Stratton	Hitchcock	NE	40.1363°N 101.2615°W	23:49–23:50	0.21 mi (0.34 km)	50 yd (46 m)
EF0	A storm chaser observed a satellite tornado to the Stratton EF3 flip an irrigation pivot.						
EF3	WNW of Stratton to SSW of Hamlet	Hitchcock	NE	40.163°N 101.2921°W	23:49–00:15	10.68 mi (17.19 km)	250 yd (230 m)
EF3	A tornado touched down south of Muddy Creek, tearing shingles from a house. North of the house location, it completely removed a metal machine shed by pulling bolts through its concrete foundation and tossing the structure about 50 yd (46 m). Two buildings at an old farmstead were leveled, a combine was pushed 60 yd (55 m), an empty grain cart was tipped into a grain truck, a drill was shoved in a quarter-circle path, and seven empty cattle feeders were scattered into a wheat field. Continuing north, the tornado damaged trees and grain bins, broke a power pole, and blew a stock tank over 100 yd (91 m) at a homestead. Turning northeast, it caused further tree, pivot, and structural damage as it crossed some roads. It then turned north again, tracking along Veterans Memorial Highway where it snapped about thirty power poles before dissipating just south of a homestead.						
EFU	NNW of Stratton	Hitchcock	NE	40.236°N 101.28°W	00:04–00:07	0.51 mi (0.82 km)	50 yd (46 m)
EFU	High-resolution satellite imagery showed a second satellite tornado occurred alongside the Stratton EF3 and remained in a field.						
EF3	NNW of Grainfield to SSW of Hoxie	Sheridan	KS	39.207°N 100.52°W	00:07–00:14	4.24 mi (6.82 km)	230 yd (210 m)
EF3	A low-end EF3 tornado began its path by snapping trees and power poles. As it approached a farm, it destroyed a metal warehouse, demolished farm equipment, and swept away an empty grain bin. The tornado continued north, causing additional tree damage and snapping more power poles before eventually lifting.						
EF2	NNW of Grainfield	Sheridan	KS	39.214°N 100.513°W	00:08–00:11	0.34 mi (0.55 km)	20 yd (18 m)
EF2	A strong satellite tornado to the Grainfield EF3 twisted a pivot and snapped tree tops on a windbreak before merging into the main tornado.						
EF0	E of Kinsley	Edwards	KS	37.89°N 99.37°W	00:21–00:33	4.18 mi (6.73 km)	50 yd (46 m)
EF0	This high-end EF0 tornado broke branches off trees and caused damage to a barn and farm equipment.						
EF2	W of Hayes Center to S of Dickens	Hayes, Lincoln	NE	40.51°N 101.09°W	00:35–01:09	17.56 mi (28.26 km)	1,000 yd (910 m)
EF2	A strong tornado moved through central Hayes County, damaging multiple center pivots and downing power lines. It impacted two farmsteads, shattering windows in both homes and vehicles. A large bovine operation suffered fencing damage and destruction to outbuildings. As the tornado entered Lincoln County, damage became more scattered but still included additional downed power lines, damaged center pivots, and tree damage before lifting.						
EF1	NNE of Mingus	Palo Pinto	TX	32.5677°N 98.412°W	00:36–00:40	0.4 mi (0.64 km)	400 yd (370 m)
EF1	This tornado caused tree damage along its path, with the most significant impacts occurring on private property. Several large pecan trees were uprooted, and a few large trunks were snapped. Numerous large branches and small tree trunks were also broken throughout the area. Additionally, sheet metal was torn from a metal shed on the northern side of the property.						
EF2	ESE of Nettleton to NW of Garfield	Edwards, Pawnee	KS	37.98°N 99.26°W	00:39–00:56	7.68 mi (12.36 km)	50 yd (46 m)
EF2	A strong tornado began north of Lewis and moved north before curving slightly west. It crossed US 56 and dissipated about two miles northwest of Garfield. Along its path, trees were uprooted and snapped, irrigation pivots were flipped, and power lines and poles were damaged.						
EF1	Gordon	Palo Pinto	TX	32.5706°N 98.3718°W	00:48–00:54	2.11 mi (3.40 km)	995 yd (910 m)
EF1	A tornado formed north of Gordon, first damaging a small building and two barns on a rural property. The tornado then tracked south-southeast and entered Gordon, causing widespread tree and power pole damage along with partial roof loss on several homes due to torn-off metal panels. Significant damage occurred at the town's high school stadium and nearby athletic fields, including destruction to locker rooms, the weight room, bleachers, scoreboards, and a stadium light pole that was bent in half. A manufactured home was destroyed in the southeastern part of town, where the tornado reached peak intensity. It continued southeast of Gordon, leaving a path of tree damage before dissipating. Four people were injured.						
EFU	ENE of Max	Dundy	NE	40.1213°N 101.377°W	00:54–00:55	0.13 mi (0.21 km)	50 yd (46 m)
EFU	An off-duty NWS employee reported a tornado crossing US 34.						
EF0	SSW of Santo	Palo Pinto	TX	32.582°N 98.2443°W	01:01–01:07	2.59 mi (4.17 km)	1,000 yd (910 m)
EF0	A multi-vortex tornado was confirmed southwest of Santo, with multiple short-lived vortices observed. Scattered tree damage occurred along its path along FM 4 south of Santo. Some vortices lasted only a few seconds, while others persisted up to thirty seconds, and at one point two vortices near FM 4 appeared to rotate around each other before dissipating.						
EFU	SE of Santo	Palo Pinto	TX	32.5982°N 98.1946°W	01:07–01:08	0.23 mi (0.37 km)	50 yd (46 m)
EFU	This tornado was recorded by storm chasers over inaccessible areas.						
EF0	N of Lipan	Parker	TX	32.5923°N 98.0496°W	01:36–01:40	3.12 mi (5.02 km)	200 yd (180 m)
EF0	A barn was destroyed and trees were damaged.						
EF3	NW of Coldwater to SSE of Mullinville	Comanche, Kiowa	KS	37.38°N 99.44°W	02:21–02:38	8.08 mi (13.00 km)	800 yd (730 m)
EF3	See section on this tornado						
EF3	S of Greensburg to Brenham	Kiowa	KS	37.5°N 99.33°W	02:44–03:06	10.41 mi (16.75 km)	900 yd (820 m)
EF3	See section on this tornado						
EF1	S of Greensburg	Kiowa	KS	37.55°N 99.28°W	02:55	0.25 mi (0.40 km)	50 yd (46 m)
EF1	A brief satellite tornado of the 0244 UTC Greensburg EF3 tornado snapped wooden power poles and partially flipped an irrigation pivot.						
EF3	SSE of Brenham to SSW of Hopewell	Kiowa, Edwards	KS	37.59°N 99.2°W	03:04–03:34	12.68 mi (20.41 km)	1,700 yd (1,600 m)
EF3	See section on this tornado						
EF0	SE of Shickley	Fillmore	NE	40.3929°N 97.6762°W	03:09–03:13	3.1 mi (5.0 km)	30 yd (27 m)
EF0	A weak tornado developed near a church, causing minor damage to church grounds and nearby center pivot irrigation systems. It traveled north, producing minor tree damage before lifting just north of N-74. The tornado’s intensity was rated based on the combined tree and equipment damage.						
EF1	NNE of Brenham	Kiowa	KS	37.64°N 99.19°W	03:14–03:21	2.82 mi (4.54 km)	50 yd (46 m)
EF1	See section on this tornado						
EF1	E of Hernando	DeSoto	MS	34.8296°N 89.9603°W	03:26–03:27	0.42 mi (0.68 km)	50 yd (46 m)
EF1	Trees were snapped or uprooted.						
EF3	N of Cullison to NE of Iuka	Pratt	KS	37.67°N 98.91°W	03:47–04:08	11.76 mi (18.93 km)	1,500 yd (1,400 m)
EF3	See section on this tornado						
EFU	SW of Iuka	Pratt	KS	37.71°N 98.75°W	04:09–04:11	1.76 mi (2.83 km)	30 yd (27 m)
EFU	See section on this tornado						
EF3	NW of Preston to Plevna to NNE of Huntsville	Pratt, Stafford, Reno	KS	37.79°N 98.65°W	04:17–05:20	32.45 mi (52.22 km)	1,760 yd (1,610 m)
EF3	See section on this tornado						

=== May 19 event ===
List of confirmed tornadoes – Monday, May 19, 2025
EF#	Location	County / parish	State	Start coord.	Time (UTC)	Path length	Max. width
EFU	WNW of St. Paul	Howard	NE	41.2258°N 98.5342°W	05:51		
EFU	A brief tornado was observed by several storm spotters.						
EF1	SE of Allen to S of Atwood	Hughes	OK	34.854°N 96.393°W	19:46–19:53	4.4 mi (7.1 km)	600 yd (550 m)
EF1	At least one home and one barn had roof damage. Significant tree damage also occurred.						
EF0	SSW of Atwood	Hughes	OK	34.91°N 96.372°W	19:53–19:56	1.8 mi (2.9 km)	40 yd (37 m)
EF0	Scattered tree damage occurred.						
EF1	NM of Briggs to Southern Pumpkin Hollow	Cherokee	OK	35.956°N 94.896°W	22:03–22:07	2.6 mi (4.2 km)	600 yd (550 m)
EF1	This tornado developed east of SH-10 and tracked eastward, snapping and uprooting numerous trees and destroying an outbuilding before crossing the Illinois River. After crossing the river, it continued to cause tree damage before dissipating.						
EF1	E of Rogers to W of North Bend	Dodge	NE	41.4569°N 96.8706°W	22:29–22:31	1.69 mi (2.72 km)	70 yd (64 m)
EF1	A tornado developed over the Platte River and moved eastward, coming ashore on the north side where it damaged campers, mobile homes, and several cottonwood and maple trees. One large cottonwood was uprooted and fell onto a home, injuring an occupant.						
EF1	SE of Wardville	Atoka	OK	34.61°N 95.986°W	22:37–22:38	1 mi (1.6 km)	400 yd (370 m)
EF1	A few trees were damaged.						
EF3	SSW of Pittsburg to SW of Hartshorne	Pittsburg	OK	34.665°N 95.863°W	22:44–23:07	16 mi (26 km)	2,972 yd (2,718 m)
EF3	A massive and intense tornado developed southwest of Pittsburg and intensified as it neared Pittsburg Lake, producing significant damage to trees and homes north of the lake, injuring one person. The tornado grew in size as it passed southeast of Pittsburg, damaging two more homes and reaching its peak width of 1.7 miles (2.7 km) near Blanco, where several homes sustained significant roof damage and numerous power poles were broken. The most intense damage occurred just east of Blanco, where a forested area was nearly leveled, with many trees stripped of bark and limbs. The tornado then gradually weakened before dissipating. One person was injured.						
EFU	NE of Du Bois	Pawnee, Richardson	NE	40.0502°N 96.0384°W	22:50–22:53	2.15 mi (3.46 km)	50 yd (46 m)
EFU	This intermittent tornado caused no damage over open land.						
EFU	SE of St. Jo	Cooke	TX	33.6668°N 97.477°W	23:02	0.12 mi (0.19 km)	40 yd (37 m)
EFU	A storm chaser recorded a tornado that lasted approximately ten seconds.						
EF1	S of Hartshorne to SW of Wilburton	Pittsburg, Latimer	OK	34.805°N 95.575°W	23:14–23:31	11.1 mi (17.9 km)	1,500 yd (1,400 m)
EF1	This large tornado developed southwest of Hartshorne Lake and tracked northeast, damaging or destroying multiple outbuildings and small industrial buildings. It also caused damage to power lines and affected several homes. The tornado then entered Latimer County, shifting to an easterly path before dissipating southwest of Wilburton.						
EF1	W of Webbers Falls to Northern Gore to Redbird Smith	Muskogee, Sequoyah	OK	35.514°N 95.205°W	23:22–23:33	9.5 mi (15.3 km)	900 yd (820 m)
EF1	A tornado developed in a rural area and moved east-northeast, destroying outbuildings, uprooting or snapping trees, and overturning a center pivot irrigation system before crossing the Arkansas River. It continued through the north side of Gore, causing additional tree and outbuilding damage, before dissipating in a rural area east of town.						
EF1	NE of Pittsburg	Pittsburg	OK	34.73°N 95.815°W	23:31–23:32	0.3 mi (0.48 km)	100 yd (91 m)
EF1	A few trees were uprooted.						
EF0	SSE of Volland	Wabaunsee	KS	38.8618°N 96.3726°W	23:42–23:43	0.38 mi (0.61 km)	40 yd (37 m)
EF0	Minor tree damage occurred.						
EF1	N of Evening Shade to Southern Lyons Switch	Cherokee, Adair	OK	35.651°N 94.894°W	23:44–23:56	12.3 mi (19.8 km)	1,100 yd (1,000 m)
EF1	This tornado developed in a rural area, snapping and uprooting numerous trees, damaging a couple of homes, destroying an outbuilding, and snapping power poles. It moved northeast through rugged terrain, continuing to snap and uproot trees and large limbs before dissipating near a lake in Adair County.						
EF1	E of Pettit to Southern Tenkiller to Rocky Mountain	Cherokee, Adair	OK	35.756°N 94.916°W	23:47–23:58	10.4 mi (16.7 km)	1,300 yd (1,200 m)
EF1	This tornado developed over Lake Tenkiller and moved northeast, snapping and uprooting numerous trees as it passed through Cherokee Landing State Park. It continued to uproot trees as it crossed SH-82 and SH-100, with additional widespread tree damage observed as it progressed toward and into Adair County. The tornado eventually dissipated after causing more tree damage beyond the county line.						
EF1	NNE of Bunch, OK to Northwestern Stilwell, OK to NW of Morrow, AR	Adair (OK), Washington (AR)	OK, AR	35.766°N 94.723°W	23:55–00:16	16.7 mi (26.9 km)	2,200 yd (2,000 m)
EF1	A tornado uprooted or snapped many trees, several homes were damaged, outbuildings were destroyed, and power poles were blown down.						
EF1	Lowry City	St. Clair	MO	38.12°N 93.74°W	23:55–00:04	4.57 mi (7.35 km)	50 yd (46 m)
EF1	This tornado began south-southwest of Lowry City and tracked through the city, causing increasing damage as it moved northeast. The most severe impacts occurred northeast of town, where a mobile home had its roof torn off, several barns and outbuildings were destroyed, trees were uprooted, and power lines were downed before the tornado lifted.						
EF1	E of Baron, OK to Clyde, AR	Adair (OK), Washington (AR)	OK, AR	35.92°N 94.533°W	00:11–00:22	8.2 mi (13.2 km)	1,000 yd (910 m)
EF1	Trees were uprooted and large tree limbs were snapped.						
EF1	ENE of Mount Zion to N of Finey	Henry	MO	38.23°N 93.59°W	00:15–00:19	3.4 mi (5.5 km)	200 yd (180 m)
EF1	This tornado began in far southeast Henry county, causing significant damage to a house, nearby outbuildings, and numerous trees. As it moved east, it continued to cause substantial tree damage along its path, with the most intense impacts extending as far as north of a local church.						
EF1	Southern Lincoln to SE of Walnut Grove	Washington	AR	35.941°N 94.429°W	00:20–00:32	11.6 mi (18.7 km)	900 yd (820 m)
EF1	A high-end EF1 tornado caused minor to severe damage to homes, uprooted or snapped numerous trees, snapped power poles, and destroyed outbuildings.						
EF1	E of Lincoln	Washington	AR	35.953°N 94.393°W	00:21–00:23	1 mi (1.6 km)	500 yd (460 m)
EF1	Trees were uprooted.						
EF1	WSW of Shady Point to SW of Pocola	LeFlore	OK	35.102°N 94.746°W	00:21–00:35	11.9 mi (19.2 km)	1,100 yd (1,000 m)
EF1	A tornado developed near Calhoun and moved northeast, uprooting trees and snapping large limbs along its path. It caused additional tree damage as it crossed SH-59 and surrounding areas before likely dissipating in a rural area to the northeast.						
EF1	W of Racket	Benton	MO	38.29°N 93.51°W	00:24–00:27	1.3 mi (2.1 km)	500 yd (460 m)
EF1	A mobile home was pushed off its foundation, outbuildings were damaged, and trees were snapped.						
EF1	S of Palo Pinto	Benton	MO	38.34°N 93.48°W	00:28–00:34	4.32 mi (6.95 km)	500 yd (460 m)
EF1	Several barns were damaged, power lines were downed, and numerous trees were uprooted or snapped.						
EF2	Greenland	Washington	AR	35.969°N 94.208°W	00:29–00:46	13.6 mi (21.9 km)	1,100 yd (1,000 m)
EF2	A strong tornado developed west of I-49, snapping and uprooting trees before moving northeast across the interstate, where it severely damaged a metal building. It continued east across the southern portion of Drake Field, then turned east-northeast, crossing AR 16 before dissipating. Along its path, numerous trees were snapped or uprooted, industrial buildings, homes, and businesses were damaged, many power poles were snapped, and several outbuildings were destroyed.						
EF1	NNW of Cameron, OK to Rock Island, OK to ESE of Central City, AR	LeFlore (OK), Sebastian (AR)	OK, AR	35.162°N 94.554°W	00:34–00:59	21.4 mi (34.4 km)	1,000 yd (910 m)
EF1	A long-track tornado developed in a rural area, initially uprooting a few trees and snapping large limbs before crossing SH-112 and entering Arkansas near Bonanza. It remained weak through the north side of Bonanza, causing minor tree damage, then strengthened near US 71, uprooting and snapping more trees. As it moved across Fort Chaffee, it damaged forty buildings and caused extensive tree damage before turning east-northeast and dissipating just before reaching AR 22.						
EF1	ENE of Palo Pinto to NNW of Lincoln	Benton	MO	38.39°N 93.41°W	00:35–00:41	4.4 mi (7.1 km)	300 yd (270 m)
EF1	Several power poles were downed and three barns were damaged. Numerous trees were uprooted with a few being snapped.						
EF1	SSE of Hinesville to Northern Huntsville to SSW of Marble	Madison	AR	36.089°N 93.849°W	00:54–01:10	14.3 mi (23.0 km)	900 yd (820 m)
EF1	This tornado developed and began to snap large tree limbs and uproot trees. It moved northeast before turning east-southeast, eventually crossing the northern side of Huntsville and tracking just south of US 412. Along its path, numerous trees were snapped or uprooted, and several outbuildings were destroyed before the tornado dissipated.						
EF1	W of Huntsville	Madison	AR	36.082°N 93.833°W	00:56–00:59	2.4 mi (3.9 km)	550 yd (500 m)
EF1	Numerous trees were snapped and outbuildings were destroyed.						
EFU	SSW of Hematite to NW of Olympian Village	Jefferson	MO	38.1543°N 90.4818°W	01:02–01:03	2.39 mi (3.85 km)	100 yd (91 m)
EFU	A tornado was captured on video but no damage was found.						
EF1	N of Marble to SW of Osage	Carroll	AR	36.16°N 93.582°W	01:11–01:20	7.2 mi (11.6 km)	2,300 yd (2,100 m)
EF1	Hundreds of trees were snapped or uprooted.						
EF1	S of Osage to SW of Carrollton	Carroll	AR	36.165°N 93.417°W	01:21–01:25	4.2 mi (6.8 km)	1,000 yd (910 m)
EF1	Outbuildings were damaged and numerous trees were snapped and/or uprooted.						
EF0	S of St. Joseph	Buchanan	MO	39.68°N 94.83°W	01:31–01:38	4.32 mi (6.95 km)	20 yd (18 m)
EF0	A weak tornado caused sporadic tree damage along its path. Minor roof damage was also reported to several buildings before the tornado dissipated.						
EF1	W of Peoria	Iron, Washington	MO	37.7253°N 90.9534°W	01:56–02:01	2.75 mi (4.43 km)	50 yd (46 m)
EF1	Tree damage occurred.						
EF1	ENE of Darien to SE of Doss	Dent	MO	37.53°N 91.56°W	03:18–03:26	6.39 mi (10.28 km)	50 yd (46 m)
EF1	A barn was damaged and trees were uprooted.						
EF0	W of Howes	Dent	MO	37.72°N 91.61°W	03:20–03:21	0.97 mi (1.56 km)	75 yd (69 m)
EF0	Trees were uprooted and barns were severely damaged.						
EF0	S of Telephone	Fannin	TX	33.7365°N 96.0434°W	03:20–03:25	1.36 mi (2.19 km)	75 yd (69 m)
EF0	Scattered tree damage occurred.						
EF0	SE of Salem	Dent	MO	37.61°N 91.55°W	03:21–03:25	4.26 mi (6.86 km)	500 yd (460 m)
EF0	Barns were damaged and numerous trees were uprooted.						
EF0	N of Max	Dent	MO	37.6027°N 91.4163°W	03:28–03:30	1.93 mi (3.11 km)	50 yd (46 m)
EF0	Trees were snapped and uprooted in a valley and a barn was damaged.						
EF0	WNW of Fletcher	Washington	MO	38.1418°N 90.7735°W	03:39–03:40	2.21 mi (3.56 km)	140 yd (130 m)
EF0	Tree damage occurred.						
EF0	WNW of Bunker	Reynolds	MO	37.5128°N 91.2426°W	03:40–03:41	1.61 mi (2.59 km)	25 yd (23 m)
EF0	A weak tornado produced tree damage.						
EF1	ESE of Cherryville	Crawford	MO	37.8327°N 91.2339°W	03:50–03:51	1.03 mi (1.66 km)	270 yd (250 m)
EF1	A small farm outbuilding was destroyed and multiple trees were damaged.						
EF1	Iron Mountain to SSE of Bismarck	St. Francois	MO	37.6901°N 90.6408°W	04:31–04:33	4.24 mi (6.82 km)	500 yd (460 m)
EF1	The tornado touched down just south of Iron Mountain, causing home and tree damage along a county highway. It continued northeast, damaging another home before dissipating shortly after.						

=== May 20 event ===
List of confirmed tornadoes – Tuesday, May 20, 2025
EF#	Location	County / parish	State	Start coord.	Time (UTC)	Path length	Max. width
EF0	N of Goose Creek Lake	Ste. Genevieve	MO	38.0211°N 90.3677°W	05:02–05:03	1.33 mi (2.14 km)	25 yd (23 m)
EF0	A high-end EF0 tornado damaged several trees.						
EF1	S of Prairie du Rocher	Randolph	IL	38.0514°N 90.1017°W	05:21–05:22	0.45 mi (0.72 km)	25 yd (23 m)
EF1	A small pole barn was collapsed.						
EF1	Northern Cape Girardeau	Cape Girardeau	MO	37.4442°N 89.1126°W	06:08–06:10	1.81 mi (2.91 km)	50 yd (46 m)
EF1	This tornado touched down at an aquatic center, damaging overhead umbrella structures and a few trees. It moved east into northern Cape Girardeau neighborhoods, where numerous trees were snapped or uprooted, and several homes sustained minor roof or siding damage. The tornado lifted shortly after passing through this residential area.						
EF0	ESE of Powderly	Lamar	TX	33.7936°N 95.4719°W	06:41–06:42	0.11 mi (0.18 km)	50 yd (46 m)
EF0	A very brief tornado damaged some trees.						
EF1	NNE of Dongola to WSW of Buncombe	Union	IL	37.4442°N 89.1126°W	06:46–06:50	1.81 mi (2.91 km)	50 yd (46 m)
EF1	A tornado touched down along IL 146, snapping and uprooting several trees. It also caused minor shingle and siding damage to a few homes before lifting.						
EF1	NW of Caddo Valley to NW of Friendship	Clark, Hot Spring	AR	34.243°N 93.1198°W	07:08–07:16	3.8 mi (6.1 km)	100 yd (91 m)
EF1	A tornado began near the northeast side of DeGray Lake at the Clark and Hot Springs county line, snapping and uprooting a swath of trees. As it moved northeast, it heavily damaged a home by shifting it off its concrete foundation, though the structure remained mostly intact. Numerous trees were downed along its path, with one falling on a house and causing structural damage. The tornado continued northeast, causing additional tree damage and moderate roof damage to another home before dissipating just north of its final crossing of AR 128.						
EF1	Northern Wright	Lauderdale	AL	34.9045°N 88.0145°W	17:03-17:08	1.78 mi (2.86 km)	80 yd (73 m)
EF1	This tornado formed over the Tennessee River and moved onshore, causing tree damage. It continued northeast, where a farm outbuilding sustained roof damage and caused further damage to trees, eventually lifting.						
EF0	N of Lewisburg	Marshall	TN	35.5141°N 86.7715°W	18:20-18:25	1.42 mi (2.29 km)	300 yd (270 m)
EF0	This tornado touched down near Cowden, uprooting several trees and lifting the roof off a barn. As it moved northeast, it crossed Big Rock Creek, damaging the roof of a home and nearby trees. It continued to uproot and snap additional trees before lifting.						
EF1	S of Coalfield	Roane	TN	35.9762°N 84.4092°W	19:15–19:16	0.49 mi (0.79 km)	100 yd (91 m)
EF1	Numerous trees were snapped.						
EF0	Northwestern Oakland	Coles, Douglas	IL	39.6602°N 88.0371°W	19:15–19:19	2.85 mi (4.59 km)	20 yd (18 m)
EF0	A weak tornado touched down on the northwest side of Oakland, damaging tree branches before moving northeast through a grove of trees. It continued across farm fields in northeastern Coles County and southeastern Douglas County without causing additional damage, eventually lifting east of Walnut Point State Park.						
EF0	W of Jackson	Madison	TN	35.5905°N 88.941°W	20:15–20:17	1.29 mi (2.08 km)	75 yd (69 m)
EF0	This tornado touched down in a wooded area and moved northeast, damaging a warehouse by tearing off portions of its roof. Video footage showed roof debris being lofted into the air, some of which was later found on the Jackson Regional Airport airfield where the tornado lifted.						
EFU	S of Latham	Logan	IL	39.9354°N 89.1677°W	20:27–20:28	1.11 mi (1.79 km)	30 yd (27 m)
EFU	A storm spotter reported a rain-wrapped tornado. No damage was found.						
EF0	NNW of Hohenwald	Lewis	TN	35.6°N 87.57°W	20:59-21:06	2.67 mi (4.30 km)	50 yd (46 m)
EF0	A brief, weak tornado was observed on web cameras. No damage was able to be accessed since the tornado occurred over inaccessible areas.						
EFU	W of Paxton	Ford	IL	40.4633°N 88.1537°W	21:09–21:11	0.65 mi (1.05 km)	100 yd (91 m)
EFU	This tornado remained over open farmland.						
EF0	N of Royal to S of Penfield	Champaign	IL	40.2488°N 87.9699°W	21:57–21:59	0.92 mi (1.48 km)	30 yd (27 m)
EF0	A high-end EF0 tornado caused some tree damage, partially removed the roof of an outbuilding, and tossed it northeast, then dissipated shortly afterward.						
EF1	ESE of Portland to WSW of Lakeport	Chicot	AR	33.2128°N 91.4107°W	22:04–22:21	11.6 mi (18.7 km)	700 yd (640 m)
EF1	This high-end EF1 tornado began along AR 160 and moved east through Chicot Junction before lifting east of US 65. Along its path, several utility poles were snapped, and numerous trees were snapped or uprooted. Two metal farm buildings near the Boeuf River were damaged, including one where concrete anchors were pulled from the ground due to its open-air design. The tornado lifted in an open field east of Bayou Macon.						
EF1	SSW of Armstrong to S of Potomac	Vermilion	IL	40.2634°N 87.8937°W	22:06–22:10	5 mi (8.0 km)	80 yd (73 m)
EF1	This tornado damaged trees and snapped two power poles as it moved east. It was caught on video shortly before snapping or uprooting around a dozen large trees before lifting.						
EF0	SW of Collison to SE of Jamesburg	Vermilion	IL	40.202°N 87.8439°W	22:06–22:15	6.67 mi (10.73 km)	40 yd (37 m)
EF0	Minor tree damage occurred.						
EF0	NNW of Woodlawn to Northern Clarksville	Montgomery	TN	36.5578°N 87.5171°W	22:08-22:19	9.41 mi (15.14 km)	100 yd (91 m)
EF0	A tornado touched down in Fort Campbell, causing minor tree damage before moving northeast through nearby neighborhoods where several trees were uprooted and tree tops snapped. After crossing US 41A, it continued to snap large tree branches along its path. The tornado lifted north of a local middle school, with damage primarily limited to trees throughout its track.						
EF1	Ford City to SE of Rogersville	Colbert, Lawrence, Lauderdale, Limestone	AL	34.7874°N 87.5347°W	22:10-22:39	17.74 mi (28.55 km)	575 yd (526 m)
EF1	This tornado touched down in Ford City, initially snapping tree limbs before rapidly intensifying and uprooting numerous trees. Nearby, a tree top snapped and fell on a home, injuring a child. The tornado reached peak intensity with the destruction of two silos that had stood since the 1930s. It continued east-southeast, uprooting trees and snapping large limbs as it passed through rural areas and crossed the Tennessee River at Wheeler Lake. Drone imagery confirmed a narrow damage path of snapped and uprooted trees south of Rogersville. The tornado crossed the Elk River and eventually weakened, snapping additional limbs and tree tops before lifting.						
EF0	Southern Clarksville to Sango	Montgomery	TN	36.4985°N 87.2743°W	22:25-22:28	3.2 mi (5.1 km)	200 yd (180 m)
EF0	A high-end EF0 tornado touched down and caused a few trees to lean or fall before moving northeast, where it uprooted and snapped additional trees and caused minor damage to homes. It lifted before reaching the area of I-24.						
EF0	ENE of Bismarck	Vermilion	IL	40.2684°N 87.5532°W	22:39–22:41	1.7 mi (2.7 km)	30 yd (27 m)
EF0	The roof of an outbuilding was damaged.						
EF0	E of Wartrace	Bedford, Coffee	TN	35.5233°N 86.2471°W	22:47-22:51	1.13 mi (1.82 km)	150 yd (140 m)
EF0	A few farm structures and trees were damaged.						
EFU	NE of Hillsboro to N of Trinity	Lawrence, Limestone	AL	34.6851°N 87.1256°W	22:51-22:57	2.19 mi (3.52 km)	25 yd (23 m)
EFU	A waterspout was observed over Wheeler Lake.						
EF1	E of Rogersville	Limestone	AL	34.8125°N 87.208°W	23:09-23:10	0.87 mi (1.40 km)	65 yd (59 m)
EF1	This brief tornado caused tree damage, including multiple downed trees and large branches as it moved east through mainly wooded areas parallel to US 72.						
EF2	SE of Tanner to Northern Madison	Limestone, Madison	AL	34.7168°N 86.9489°W	23:09-23:35	13.15 mi (21.16 km)	380 yd (350 m)
EF2	This strong tornado, which prompted the issuance of a tornado emergency as it approached Huntsville, was first observed west of I-65 near Tanner and caused numerous trees to be uprooted or snapped as it crossed I-65. It continued eastward, damaging trees and inflicting minor roof damage to several structures. Upon entering Madison County, it caused minor roof damage to multiple homes and downed trees, with one home experiencing significant facade damage. The tornado then reached peak intensity, where two homes lost most or all of their roofing and numerous trees were uprooted. It continued east with sporadic tree damage and dissipated thereafter.						
EF1	Athens	Limestone	AL	34.7749°N 87.0065°W	23:11-23:13	2.76 mi (4.44 km)	160 yd (150 m)
EF1	A tornado likely began south of US 72 and moved east-northeast, causing significant damage near its initial touchpoint, including snapped wooden power poles and broken cross members. Numerous trees were uprooted, and additional power poles were snapped along its path. The tornado continued through the area near US 72 before lifting shortly thereafter.						
EF1	Eastern Huntsville to S of Maysville	Madison	AL	34.7355°N 86.5645°W	23:51-23:57	8.68 mi (13.97 km)	280 yd (260 m)
EF1	A high-end EF1 tornado began on the eastern side of Huntsville, snapping hardwood and softwood trees at the base of Monte Sano Mountain. It intensified as it moved upslope, causing widespread tree damage across Monte Sano State Park. After crossing the mountain, it continued through Moontown, producing additional tree damage near the Flint River. As it moved south of US 72, it weakened near Madison County High School, downing several power poles. The tornado finally dissipated after causing minor tree and barn damage in nearby fields.						
EF1	S of Basham to Priceville	Morgan	AL	34.4683°N 87.0294°W	23:52-00:00	11.02 mi (17.73 km)	540 yd (490 m)
EF1	This tornado touched down and moved east toward US 31, uprooting trees and snapping large branches. It continued eastward, reaching its max width and snapping numerous large tree branches. The tornado continued across US 31, then turned northeast, damaging additional trees as it crossed I-65 and moved into Priceville. It caused more scattered large branch damage before lifting.						
EF2	E of Maysville to N of Trenton	Madison, Jackson	AL	34.7649°N 86.3811°W	00:07-00:17	7.05 mi (11.35 km)	400 yd (370 m)
EF2	A strong tornado touched down and initially downed a large swath of hardwood trees, also damaging a barn by uplifting part of its roof. As it moved across open fields, it intensified to high-end EF2 strength, completely destroying a mobile home and throwing its frame over 150 yards (140 m). Debris from the home was scattered up to 250 yards (230 m) away. Nearby homes sustained roof damage and projectile impacts, with one structure suffering major structural failure due to poor anchoring. The tornado continued upslope, snapping and uprooting large areas of hardwood trees before lifting.						
EF1	Trenton to ESE of Skyline	Jackson	AL	34.7522°N 86.2435°W	00:14-00:28	10.46 mi (16.83 km)	275 yd (251 m)
EF1	A high-end EF1 tornado touched down just southeast of SR 65 in Trenton, producing large limb damage before strengthening and snapping or uprooting trees along its path. Near Guess Creek, it downed large swaths of trees and embedded debris several feet into the ground. Minor roof damage and the loss of a roof on an older outbuilding were also observed. The tornado continued northeast, causing additional tree damage at a cemetery and a downstream farm. It produced sporadic tree damage in several areas before crossing SR 79, eventually snapping a few more trees south of Maynard Cove where it dissipated.						
EF1	N of Melvine	Cumberland	TN	35.7875°N 85.0849°W	00:29-00:37	4.79 mi (7.71 km)	150 yd (140 m)
EF1	A tornado touched down near New Era, causing timber damage and minor structural damage to homes. As it moved east-northeast, it produced more substantial tree damage and damaged or removed roofs from two homes in the Big Lick area. The tornado continued to cause timber and power line damage before lifting near SR 28.						
EF1	W of Union Grove	Marshall	AL	34.4243°N 86.5686°W	01:46-01:50	3.39 mi (5.46 km)	150 yd (140 m)
EF1	A tornado began on the northern portion of the Cherokee Ridge Golf Course, uprooting multiple hardwood trees across several holes. It moved eastward, crossing US 231 and continuing to uproot numerous trees along its path. Additional tree damage was observed further northeast before the tornado lifted before reaching Union Grove.						
EF0	Section to ESE of Dutton	Jackson	AL	34.5794°N 85.9819°W	01:47-01:52	6.09 mi (9.80 km)	105 yd (96 m)
EF0	This tornado began near the intersection of SR 71 and SR 35, close to local baseball fields, primarily downing small and large tree branches. Two trees were uprooted, though both showed signs of rot. The tornado continued eastward, causing minor damage before lifting.						
EF1	Crossville to WNW of Collinsville	DeKalb	AL	34.2848°N 85.991°W	02:33-02:42	6 mi (9.7 km)	700 yd (640 m)
EF1	A tornado began in Crossville, uprooting a large tree, snapping a thick branch, and damaging a small porch. It moved east, roughly paralleling SR 68, causing sporadic tree damage and breaking large branches. At the Sand Mountain Research Extension Center, it intensified, collapsing the roof of a building. Continuing east, it uprooted a large tree and snapped another with signs of rot. As it weakened, it tossed a hay covering structure across a field and tore through part of a barn wall. The tornado narrowed and continued east to east-southeast, causing additional tree and branch damage before lifting east of a nearby roadway.						
EF1	NNW of Sand Rock	DeKalb	AL	34.2941°N 85.7893°W	02:49-02:52	0.37 mi (0.60 km)	250 yd (230 m)
EF1	This tornado began by uprooting a large tree and snapping a nearby branch before quickly strengthening near SR 176. At one residence, three large pine trees were partially uprooted, and another snapped in a different direction, falling onto a mobile home and destroying a carport. A nearby camper trailer was lifted, dragged 15 yards (14 m), and flipped on its side. Additional minor tree limb damage was observed further along the path before the tornado ended.						
EF0	NW of Folsom to E of Sonoraville	Gordon	GA	34.4109°N 84.867°W	03:42–03:49	4.72 mi (7.60 km)	200 yd (180 m)
EF0	A high-end EF0 tornado touched down southeast of Calhoun, uprooting several large trees, including one that fell onto a home. It continued northeast, snapping and uprooting more trees and tearing roofing from part of a chicken house. In a nearby neighborhood, numerous trees were downed, some falling onto homes, while a manufactured home lost roofing and siding, a pontoon boat was flipped, and two small sheds were destroyed. The tornado lifted shortly after exiting the neighborhood.						
EF0	W of Sonoraville	Gordon	GA	34.4541°N 84.8723°W	03:43–03:47	2.39 mi (3.85 km)	100 yd (91 m)
EF0	A weak tornado touched down near SR 53, uprooting a few small trees before crossing the highway and destroying a pole barn, with debris scattered roughly 150 yards (140 m). It continued east, snapping and uprooting several trees, including one that fell on a home, and severely damaging a barn by removing its roof and blowing out a wall. In a nearby neighborhood, it snapped additional trees and scattered branches before weakening and dissipating.						

=== May 21 event ===
List of confirmed tornadoes – Wednesday, May 21, 2025
EF#	Location	County / parish	State	Start coord.	Time (UTC)	Path length	Max. width
EF0	Waleska	Cherokee	GA	34.3216°N 84.5631°W	04:09–04:13	2.05 mi (3.30 km)	150 yd (140 m)
EF0	This tornado touched down just northwest of Waleska shortly after midnight, initially uprooting or snapping a few trees. It continued east-southeast, paralleling SR 140 and downing several trees near homes on both sides of the road. The tornado maintained this pattern as it crossed the intersection of SR 140 and SR 108 in Waleska, causing additional tree damage near residences before lifting behind a home.						
EF1	SW of Saks to Anniston	Calhoun	AL	33.6952°N 85.8854°W	04:38–04:42	3.52 mi (5.66 km)	1,000 yd (910 m)
EF1	This tornado likely touched down in the restricted area of the Pelham Range, with the first accessible damage involving several large uprooted trees. As it moved east-southeast, it snapped and uprooted swaths of trees, some of which fell on both manufactured and site-built homes. Numerous pine trees blocked traffic along SR 46 and additional tree damage was reported near its intersection with other roads. The tornado continued roughly along SR 46, causing widespread tree damage before crossing US 431. Damage became more sparse and sporadic beyond this point, suggesting the tornado weakened and transitioned into a thunderstorm wind event.						
EF1	N of Ranburne	Cleburne	AL	33.574°N 85.3624°W	05:25–05:30	1.97 mi (3.17 km)	550 yd (500 m)
EF1	A tornado first touched down in a field where it destroyed half of an old barn and lofted debris in multiple directions. Part of the barn’s roof landed on a nearby home, embedding debris into the roof and yard. The home itself only suffered minor damage, including fascia damage and a partially collapsed garage door. Additional debris from the barn was found hundreds of yards away in a nearby pasture. As the tornado moved east-southeast, it snapped and uprooted hardwood trees along its path. It weakened further along its track, causing only minor tree branch damage before dissipating.						
EF1	Southeastern Heron Bay to Southern Locust Grove to NW of Jackson	Spalding, Henry, Butts	GA	33.3288°N 84.1823°W	07:39–07:56	10.35 mi (16.66 km)	300 yd (270 m)
EF1	A tornado touched down, initially knocking over trees before crossing SR 155 and tearing the roof off a large barn. A nearby camper with two occupants was lifted and slammed back down, sustaining damage from both impact and flying debris but miraculously, the occupants were not harmed. The tornado continued east, snapping and uprooting trees as it crossed into Henry county and then over I-75. It caused additional tree damage east of the interstate and entered a neighborhood in Locust Grove where numerous trees were downed, including several falling onto homes. The tornado moved into Butts county, continuing to snap and uproot trees along its path, with some of the damage overlapping areas still recovering from a tornado in January 2023. It eventually lifted just before reaching the northern part of Jackson.						
EF1	ESE of Mathews to S of Fitzpatrick	Bullock	AL	32.1896°N 85.9662°W	08:58–09:09	4.98 mi (8.01 km)	900 yd (820 m)
EF1	This tornado began in an open pasture, snapping large branches and uprooting one tree. It moved east through a small hunting club, uprooting additional trees, though no structural damage was observed. The tornado intensified as it crossed a county road, producing a wide swath of snapped and uprooted hardwood and softwood trees. It continued through mostly inaccessible wooded and pasture areas before dissipating, with minor tree damage noted near its endpoint.						
EF0	Unionville	Butler	PA	40.9381°N 79.9633°W	20:37–20:39	0.36 mi (0.58 km)	160 yd (150 m)
EF0	A tornado touched down, causing minor tree damage before severely damaging the Center Township salt dome by lifting its roof and depositing it in the nearby parking lot. A few additional trees sustained broken limbs and the tornado lifted shortly after in an open field northeast of the facility.						
EF0	NE of Unionville	Butler	PA	40.9639°N 79.8913°W	20:40–20:41	0.24 mi (0.39 km)	210 yd (190 m)
EF0	Several trees had large branches broken.						
EF0	E of West Middletown	Washington	PA	40.25°N 80.38°W	20:47–20:50	2.22 mi (3.57 km)	75 yd (69 m)
EF0	Several large tree limbs were snapped and fascia was removed on a home.						
EF1	McGovern to Gastonville	Washington	PA	40.2375°N 80.2618°W	20:57–21:21	13.89 mi (22.35 km)	200 yd (180 m)
EF1	This tornado first broke tree limbs and uprooted or snapped trees, with peak intensity observed in Houston where homes lost shingles, a lamp post was bent, a stop sign was tilted, and a metal porch awning was torn off. After weakening near a local school, the tornado fluctuated in strength, damaging trees, laying over wheat, and removing shingles from a barn. It intensified slightly near Finleyville where several trees were uprooted or snapped and siding was torn from a three-story apartment building. The tornado dissipated near PA 88.						

=== May 23 event ===
List of confirmed tornadoes – Friday, May 23, 2025
EF#	Location	County / parish	State	Start coord.	Time (UTC)	Path length	Max. width
EF1	SE of Willard to SE of Messex	Logan, Washington	CO	40.55°N 103.48°W	00:09–00:28	10.68 mi (17.19 km)	100 yd (91 m)
EF1	An EF1 tornado touched down south of Willard and tracked south-southeast, snapping hardwood trees near the South Platte River. The tornado then impacted silos off of US 6, removing the tops off of two of them and destroying another.						
EF2	SE of Messex to N of Akron	Washington	CO	40.38°N 103.27°W	00:37–00:59	8.72 mi (14.03 km)	400 yd (370 m)
EF2	A highly visible tornado touched down to the southeast of Messex, about 3 miles (4.8 km) west of SH 63, and paralleled the highway, causing minimal damage initially. The tornado then impacted several power poles off of County Road 50, reaching maximum width. A single family residence off of County Road AA was impacted at high-end EF1 intensity, blowing out windows, completely destroying several outbuildings, and snapping hardwood trees. Power lines to the south were snapped and tossed 25 yd (23 m), indicating EF2 level strength.						
EFU	SE of Akron	Washington	CO	40.13°N 103.18°W	01:10–01:13	0.51 mi (0.82 km)	30 yd (27 m)
EFU	A brief tornado occurred in an open field with no damage observed.						
EFU	SE of Kit Carson	Cheyenne	CO	38.7609°N 102.7867°W	01:27–01:33	0.51 mi (0.82 km)	15 yd (14 m)
EFU	An off duty NWS employee and other storm chasers observed a tornado just southeast of town.						

=== May 24 event ===
List of confirmed tornadoes – Saturday, May 24, 2025
EF#	Location	County / parish	State	Start coord.	Time (UTC)	Path length	Max. width
EF1	SE of Vanoss	Pontotoc	OK	34.758°N 96.865°W	09:10–09:15	2.61 mi (4.20 km)	50 yd (46 m)
EF1	A home suffered significant roof damage. A few other buildings were also damaged.						
EFU	NE of Canal Point	Palm Beach	FL	26.8611°N 80.6°W	20:24		
EFU	A landspout remained over open land.						
EFU	W of Spur	Dickens	TX	33.49°N 100.92°W	00:54		
EFU	A storm chaser photographed a brief landspout.						

=== May 25 event ===
List of confirmed tornadoes – Sunday, May 25, 2025
EF#	Location	County / parish	State	Start coord.	Time (UTC)	Path length	Max. width
EF1	NW of Estill Springs	Franklin	TN	35.2744°N 86.2358°W	21:01–21:08	6.78 mi (10.91 km)	100 yd (91 m)
EF1	A tornado touched down east of a marina on Tims Ford Lake and snapped and uprooted hardwood trees before continuing east-northeast. It caused sporadic tree damage along its path, especially near and just beyond US 41A before lifting north of Estill Springs.						
EF0	E of Hytop to Stevenson	Jackson	AL	34.9084°N 85.967°W	21:34–21:44	8.05 mi (12.96 km)	140 yd (130 m)
EF0	This high-end EF0 tornado uprooted trees and broke large tree branches.						
EF0	ENE of Trion to SSW of Subligna	Chattooga	GA	34.5568°N 85.2654°W	21:40–21:50	3.93 mi (6.32 km)	250 yd (230 m)
EF0	A tornado touched down, primarily damaging trees which were snapped or uprooted as it moved northeast. As it crossed Taylor Ridge, additional tree damage occurred and a securely-anchored carport was torn from the ground. A large tree also snapped onto a nearby car. The tornado dissipated just east of that location.						
EFU	ENE of Afton	Dickens	TX	33.7902°N 100.6831°W	21:53–21:54	0.7 mi (1.1 km)	30 yd (27 m)
EFU	A storm chaser photographed a brief tornado over open ranch land.						
EF1	W of Reeves to S of Lily Pond	Gordon	GA	34.4586°N 85.0397°W	22:08–22:23	6.01 mi (9.67 km)	750 yd (690 m)
EF1	This tornado touched down near the Oostanaula River, destroying a large barn with cement-anchored posts pulled from the ground. It continued southeast, intermittently snapping trees before crossing SR 53 and damaging a chicken farm where one house collapsed and others lost metal roofing and siding. Additional tree damage occurred along its path with the tornado eventually weakening and lifting just west of US 41/SR 3.						
EF1	NW of Red Bud	Gordon	GA	34.5452°N 84.832°W	22:13–22:15	0.26 mi (0.42 km)	100 yd (91 m)
EF1	A brief tornado heavily damaged a free-standing barn, tearing off its hurricane-strapped metal roof and scattering debris into nearby trees. Several large trees were snapped or uprooted and a second older barn lost most of its metal roof before the tornado lifted.						
EF1	Eastern Floyd	Roosevelt	NM	34.185°N 103.5902°W	23:20–23:37	5.2 mi (8.4 km)	300 yd (270 m)
EF1	This tornado began south-southwest of Floyd, damaging trees before crossing NM 267 and intensifying. The tornado then snapped 30-35 power poles near their bases at its peak intensity. It weakened as it neared a dairy farm, mangling a farm sprinkler system and causing minor fence and roof damage before lifting. At the 2026 American Meteorological Society (AMS) Madison Summit, a photogrammetric analysis by Anton Seimon was presented which showed the tornado had winds of 90 metres per second (200 mph; 320 km/h), reaching the EF5 wind speed threshold.						
EFU	NW of Stamford	Haskell	TX	33°N 99.86°W	00:39–00:41	0.56 mi (0.90 km)	50 yd (46 m)
EFU	A brief tornado was reported.						
EFU	N of Stamford	Haskell, Jones	TX	32.96°N 99.8°W	01:05–01:08	0.91 mi (1.46 km)	50 yd (46 m)
EFU	A storm chaser reported a brief tornado.						

=== May 26 event ===
List of confirmed tornadoes – Monday, May 26, 2025
EF#	Location	County / parish	State	Start coord.	Time (UTC)	Path length	Max. width
EF1	S of Dry Prong to W of Pollock	Grant	LA	31.5177°N 92.5277°W	16:03–16:08	3.49 mi (5.62 km)	280 yd (260 m)
EF1	A tornado occurred in the Kisatchie National Forest, touching down along LA 8 where it damaged numerous hardwood and softwood trees. The most concentrated damage occurred as it moved east-southeast, with uprooted trees and large limbs downed. Tree damage remained notable as it crossed US 167 south of Bentley, though it became more sporadic. The tornado then turned northeast, crossed LA 8 again, and continued snapping pine trees until it lifted. Some of the downed trees fell onto homes, damaging roofs.						
EF1	WNW of Pelahatchie	Rankin	MS	32.3747°N 89.8957°W	20:01–20:10	3.25 mi (5.23 km)	70 yd (64 m)
EF1	Several trees were snapped or uprooted.						
EF0	W of Montezuma	San Miguel	NM	35.65°N 105.32°W	20:26–20:30	1.25 mi (2.01 km)	50 yd (46 m)
EF0	A tornado was observed.						
EF1	N of Enterprise to SSW of Zero	Clarke, Lauderdale	MS	32.19°N 88.8264°W	21:05–21:16	8.77 mi (14.11 km)	200 yd (180 m)
EF1	Scattered damage occurred in the form of broken or uprooted trees.						
EFU	S of Menard	Menard	TX	30.89°N 99.8°W	21:13–21:16	1.35 mi (2.17 km)	100 yd (91 m)
EFU	A trained spotter reported a tornado.						
EF0	Alafaya	Orange	FL	28.54°N 81.17°W	22:30–22:32	0.11 mi (0.18 km)	15 yd (14 m)
EF0	A brief waterspout occurred over a lake and came ashore causing minor damage to shingles.						
EFU	S of White Deer	Carson	TX	35.36°N 101.16°W	23:33–23:35	0.01 mi (0.016 km)	25 yd (23 m)
EFU	A tornado remained over open fields.						

=== May 27 event ===
List of confirmed tornadoes – Tuesday, May 27, 2025
EF#	Location	County / parish	State	Start coord.	Time (UTC)	Path length	Max. width
EF0	SSW of Bowdon to WNW of Tyus	Carroll	GA	33.4964°N 85.2826°W	18:22–18:24	1.61 mi (2.59 km)	125 yd (114 m)
EF0	A weak tornado developed along the leading edge of a boundary interaction, uprooting a tree and scattering debris in a field. It continued east and crossed SR 100 where additional trees were uprooted. It then weakened and lifted after downing two more trees in a wooded area.						
EF0	S of Tyus to NNE of Roosterville	Carroll	GA	33.4373°N 85.2135°W	18:29–18:33	2.6 mi (4.2 km)	150 yd (140 m)
EF0	A high-end EF0 tornado touched down, initially uprooting a few trees. As it strengthened, it snapped large trees, tore the roof off a barn and scattering debris 100 yards (91 m), and removed the roof from a small shed. It continued through wooded areas, snapping additional trees and damaging more trees near a chicken farm before dissipating.						
EF1	Northern Newnan	Coweta	GA	33.4057°N 84.7688°W	19:08–19:12	2.65 mi (4.26 km)	150 yd (140 m)
EF1	This tornado began in a residential area, snapping large limbs and breaking branches. It moved northeast into an industrial park, reaching peak intensity near a warehouse where it caused minor roof and siding damage and snapped or uprooted numerous trees. Continuing east, it snapped more trees before crossing I-85 and weakening. It broke additional large limbs in another industrial area before dissipating just west of White Oak Creek.						
EF1	S of Raymer	Weld, Morgan	CO	40.5343°N 103.8539°W	22:47–22:57	1.13 mi (1.82 km)	30 yd (27 m)
EF1	A narrow tornado touched down in southern Weld county and moved slowly south into Morgan county. Its only confirmed damage was to an old garage on a farm where the roof was lifted off and the walls collapsed; dissipating shortly thereafter. No other structures were affected.						
EF0	Redstone Arsenal	Madison	AL	34.6401°N 86.6738°W	23:51–23:53	0.12 mi (0.19 km)	25 yd (23 m)
EF0	A brief tornado touched down in Redstone Arsenal, bending fencing and shifting or tossing multiple 500 lb (230 kg) storage tanks. It then severely damaged a light metal frame storage building by shearing foundation bolts, collapsing one side, and scattering debris several hundred yards before dissipating shortly afterward.						

=== May 29 event ===
List of confirmed tornadoes – Thursday, May 29, 2025
EF#	Location	County / parish	State	Start coord.	Time (UTC)	Path length	Max. width
EF0	Northwestern Mobile	Mobile	AL	30.7207°N 88.2129°W	14:03–14:08	2.5 mi (4.0 km)	100 yd (91 m)
EF0	Numerous large tree branches were downed and a few trees were uprooted. Two homes were damaged by falling trees and branches.						
EF2	NE of Luella to SSE of Blacksville	Henry	GA	33.3766°N 84.1499°W	19:31-19:36	1.82 mi (2.93 km)	200 yd (180 m)
EF2	A high-end EF2 tornado touched down near a roadway with minor tree damage before quickly intensifying as it moved northeast through a wooded area and residential subdivision. Several homes sustained EF1 damage and one was completely destroyed at EF2 strength with only a small interior closet left intact; both occupants were injured, one critically. Debris from the home was scattered hundreds of yards. The tornado continued northeast, snapping and uprooting trees and causing minor damage in an apartment complex before crossing I-75, where more trees were downed. It weakened further as it crossed US 23/SR 42, causing minor damage to trees and an industrial building before lifting.						
EFU	Northern Herriman	Salt Lake	UT	40.5297°N 112.04°W	19:56–20:01		
EFU	A well-defined landspout was recorded and posted onto social media.						
EFU	W of Loving	Eddy	NM	32.3°N 104.11°W	20:04–20:07		
EFU	A landspout was reported.						
EFU	S of Levelland	Hockley	TX	33.133°N 102.338°W	20:15		
EFU	This landspout was recorded and posted on social media.						
EF0	E of St. Johns	St. Johns	FL	30.0788°N 81.5306°W	20:53–20:57	1.61 mi (2.59 km)	15 yd (14 m)
EF0	A high-end EF0 tornado touched down at a golf course, snapping large branches from both softwood and hardwood trees. It overturned a storage shed, scattered debris, and caused a few trees to lean as it moved through a wooded area. The tornado then crossed near SR 9B before dissipating over a retention pond.						
EFU	Logan	Cache	UT	41.7198°N 111.8399°W	21:53–21:58		
EFU	This landspout was photographed.						
EFU	SW of Brownfield	Terry	TX	33.133°N 102.338°W	22:12		
EFU	A brief landspout was photographed.						
EF1	N of Mungerville to NW of Lamesa	Dawson	TX	32.8362°N 102.0815°W	23:09–23:24	6.82 mi (10.98 km)	100 yd (91 m)
EF1	This dusty tornado damaged trees and the awning of a house.						
EF1	SSE of Lamesa to N of Sparenberg	Dawson	TX	32.65°N 101.88°W	23:46–23:50	4.36 mi (7.02 km)	50 yd (46 m)
EF1	A few irrigation pivots were moved.						
EFU	WSW of Glen Cove	Coleman	TX	31.86°N 99.67°W	02:31–02:37	0.95 mi (1.53 km)	50 yd (46 m)
EFU	A storm chaser recorded a tornado as a tornado remained over open terrain.						

=== May 30 event ===
List of confirmed tornadoes – Friday, May 30, 2025
EF#	Location	County / parish	State	Start coord.	Time (UTC)	Path length	Max. width
EF2	ENE of Texas to NNW of Perryville	Washington, Boyle	KY	37.667°N 85.0586°W	10:49–10:59	5.51 mi (8.87 km)	450 yd (410 m)
EF2	1 death – A strong tornado began on a ridgetop, snapping hardwood trees and hurling a chicken cage nearly a quarter mile. It quickly intensified to EF2 strength, producing a concentrated swath of destruction. A well-built barn with living quarters was swept off its foundation and thrown into a valley, with several occupants thrown from the structure but surviving. Continuing east-northeast, the tornado completely destroyed a nearby home, scattering debris into a ravine and resulting in one fatality and at least two injuries. EF1 damage continued east-southeast with snapped trees, partial roof damage, and a collapsed barn. As the tornado crossed into Boyle County, it caused additional tree damage before lifting in the Perryville Battlefield State Historic Site. Fourteen people were injured in total.						
EF1	N of Burgin	Mercer	KY	37.7744°N 84.7657°W	11:22–11:25	1.47 mi (2.37 km)	50 yd (46 m)
EF1	This tornado caused damaged trees and destroyed an outbuilding near a residence, where large branches were snapped and a garage door was blown in. It crossed KY 33, uprooting trees and blowing the roof off a barn. As it moved across farmland, more tree damage was observed with additional large branches snapped before it weakened and caused no further visible damage.						
EF0	NNW of Sweetwater	Loudon, Monroe	TN	35.6534°N 84.5193°W	12:36–12:38	2.45 mi (3.94 km)	200 yd (180 m)
EF0	This tornado caused minor damage to homes and barns and rolled a camper trailer multiple times. As it moved east, it impacted a farm and rolled another camper trailer before dissipating in nearby fields. Three people were injured when the campers were rolled.						
EFU	N of Ropesville	Hockley	TX	33.499°N 102.152°W	20:10–20:19		
EFU	Several photographs were taken of this landspout that remained over open land.						
EF1	SW of Summerton	Clarendon	SC	33.6007°N 80.4697°W	21:01–21:14	9.99 mi (16.08 km)	200 yd (180 m)
EF1	A tornado embedded within a much larger area of damaging straight-line winds likely formed over Lake Marion and moved southeast after coming ashore. It initially snapped large branches and limbs, then intensified and caused significant tree and power line damage in several areas. As it crossed US 15 and I-95, only minor tree damage was noted. The tornado then uprooted numerous trees before gradually weakening and producing minor damage before dissipating.						
EF0	NNE of Luray	Page	VA	38.693°N 78.44°W	22:06–22:08	0.83 mi (1.34 km)	75 yd (69 m)
EF0	A small shed and a fence were destroyed. Several large tree branches were snapped and a few trees were uprooted.						
EF0	E of McConnells	York	SC	34.8712°N 81.1561°W	22:33–22:36	0.25 mi (0.40 km)	25 yd (23 m)
EF0	Several trees were snapped and a barn and playground suffered minor damage.						

== See also ==
- Tornadoes of 2025
- List of United States tornadoes in April 2025
- List of United States tornadoes from June to July 2025
