= Tyus =

Tyus is a given name and surname. Notable people with the name include:

== Surname ==
- Alex Tyus (born 1988), American-Israeli basketball player
- Anthony Tyus III (born 2003), American football player
- Leroy Tyus (1916–1998) American politician and real estate developer
- Tina Tyus-Shaw, American television news anchor and journalist
- Wyomia Tyus, American athlete

== Given name ==
- Tyus Battle, American basketball player
- Tyus Bowser, American football player
- Tyus Edney, American basketball coach and former player
- Tyus Jackson, American football linebacker
- Tyus Jones, American basketball player

== See also ==
- Tyus, Perm Krai, a locality in Russia
- Tyus, Georgia, a community in the United States
