= Trenton, Alabama =

Unincorporated community in Alabama, United States

- Unincorporated community
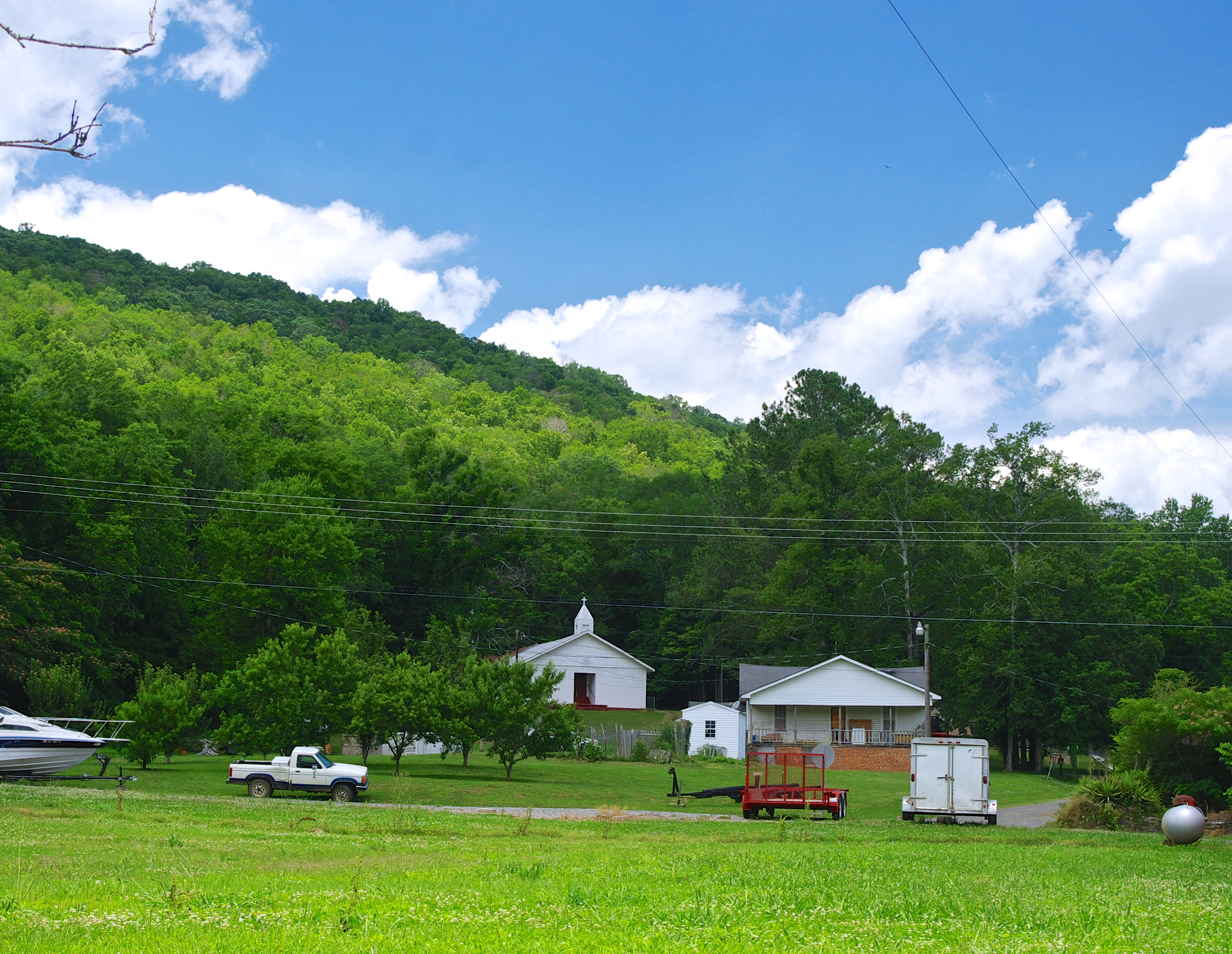
- Trenton

- Location within Alabama Location within the United States
- Coordinates: 34°44′41″N 86°15′06″W
- Country: United States
- State: Alabama
- County: Jackson
- Elevation: 673 ft (205 m)
- Time zone: UTC-6 (Central (CST))
  - Summer (DST): UTC-5 (CDT)
- ZIP code: 35774
- Area codes: 256 & 938
- GNIS feature ID: 128063

Trenton is an unincorporated community in Jackson County, Alabama, United States. It is located on Alabama State Route 65, 7.7 miles (12.4 km) east-northeast of Gurley in the Paint Rock Valley. Trenton had a post office until it closed on November 5, 2011; it still has its own ZIP code, 35774.
