= Old Concord, Pennsylvania =

Unincorporated community in Pennsylvania, US

- Unincorporated community
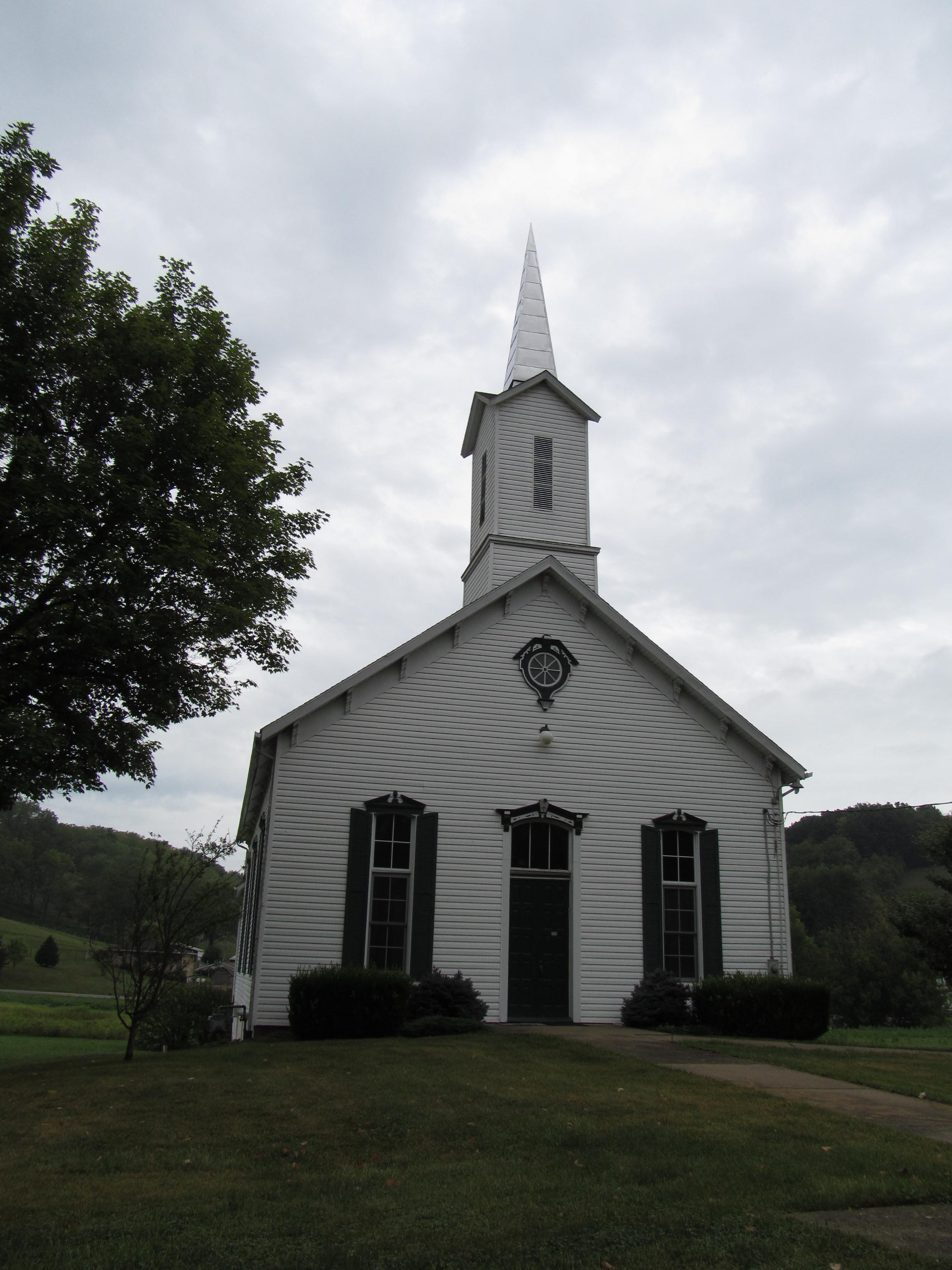
- A church in Old Concord, 2012

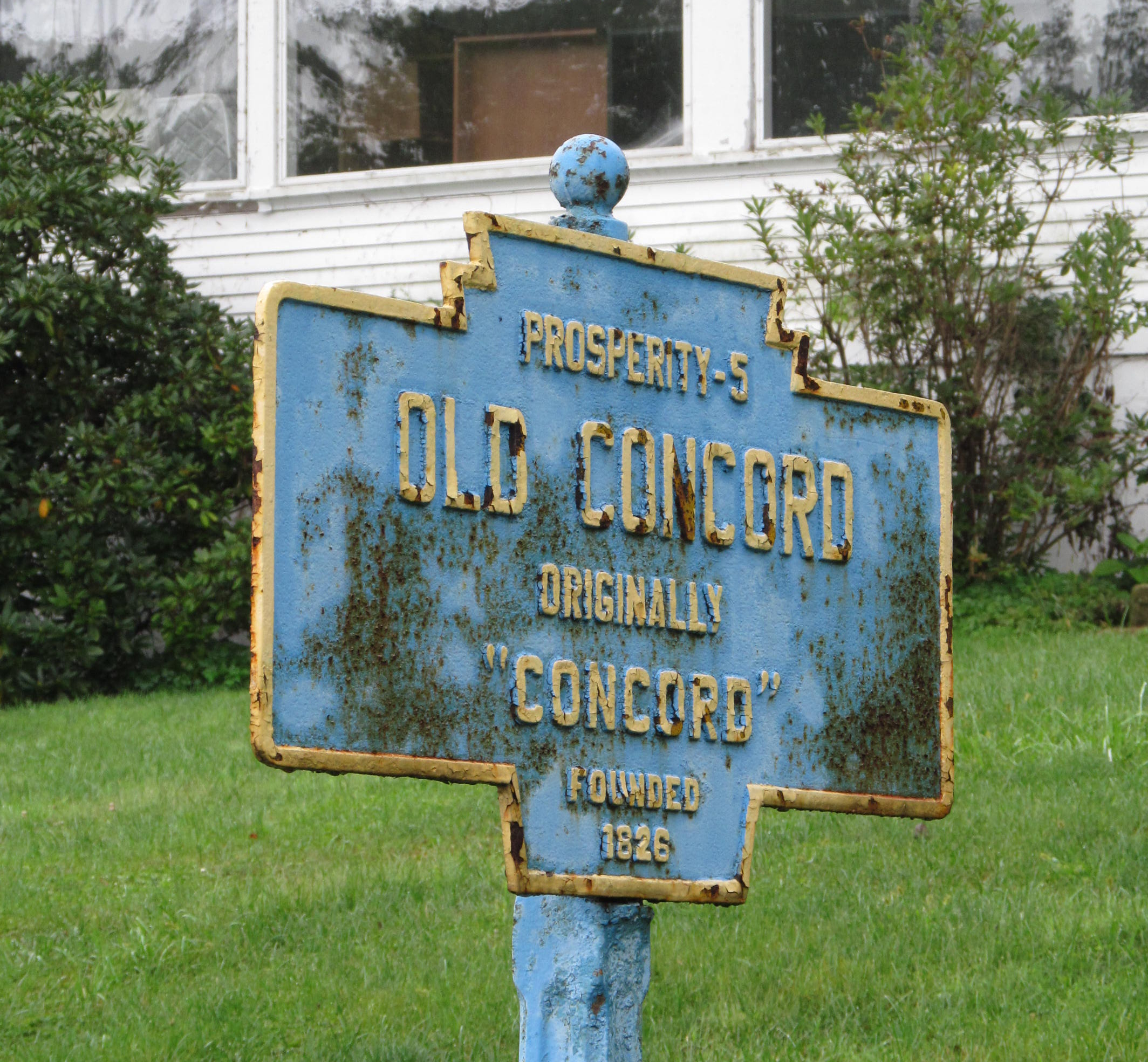
- Keystone Marker
- Interactive map of Old Concord, Pennsylvania
- Country: United States
- State: Pennsylvania
- County: Washington
- Settled: 1826
- Time zone: UTC-5 (Eastern (EST))
  - Summer (DST): UTC-4 (EDT)

Old Concord is an unincorporated community in Washington County, Pennsylvania, United States.
