= Max, Missouri =

Extinct hamlet in Missouri, U.S.

Coordinates: 37°34′29″N 91°23′01″W

Max is an extinct town in Dent County, in the U.S. state of Missouri. The GNIS classifies it as a populated place.

A post office called Max was established in 1912, and remained in operation until 1954. An early postmaster gave the community the first name of his son, Max Coffman.
