= Messex, Colorado =

Unincorporated community in Washington County, CO, USA

- Unincorporated community
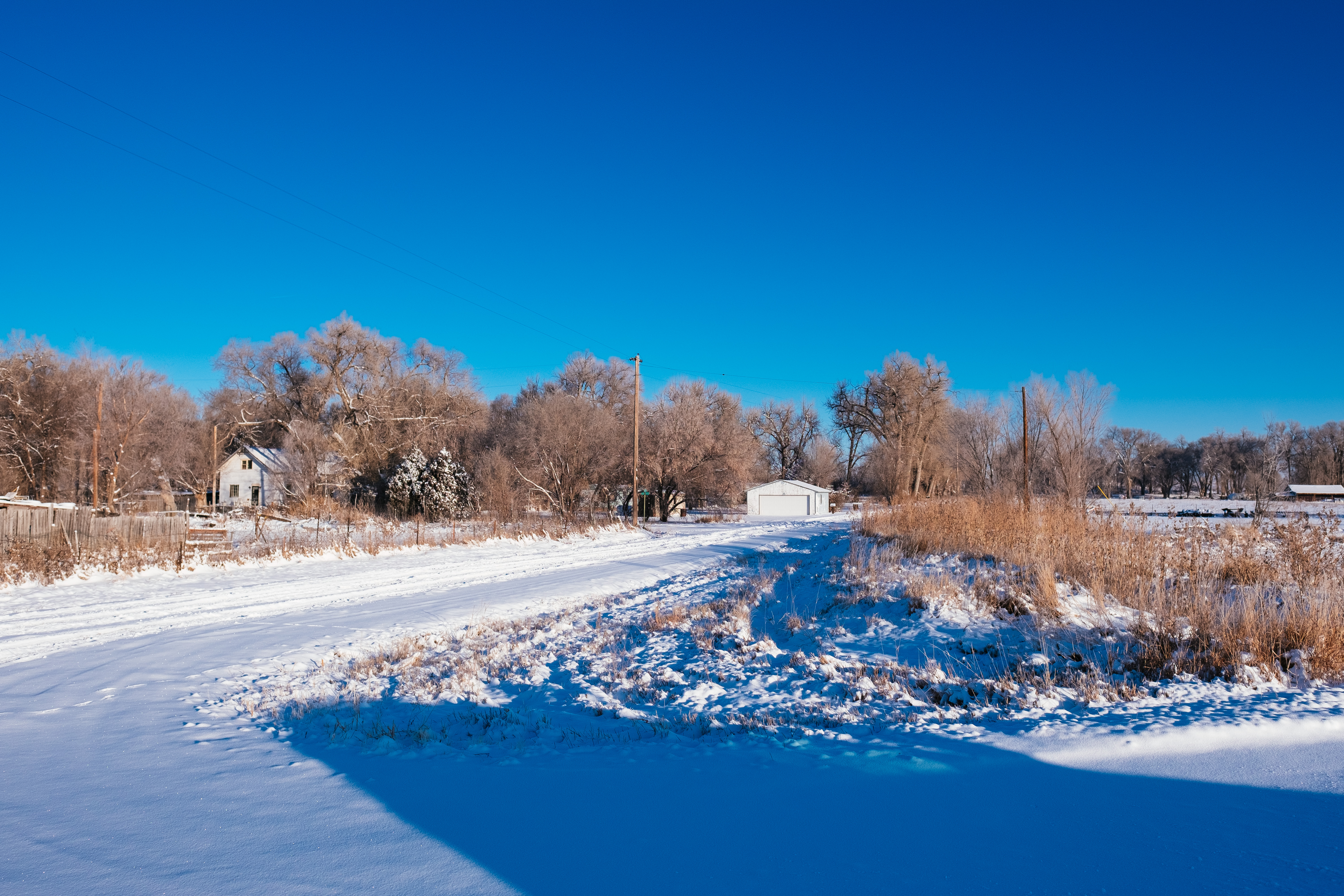
- Messex in winter

- Location within the state of Colorado
- Coordinates: 40°25′46″N 103°26′12″W
- Country: United States
- State: Colorado
- County: Washington County
- Elevation: 4,088 ft (1,246 m)

Population (2010)
  - Total: 2
- Time zone: UTC-7 (MST)
  - Summer (DST): UTC-6 (MDT)
- GNIS place ID: 182869

Messex, Colorado is a virtual ghost town in Washington County, Colorado. Its population in the 2010 census was 2, but has been several hundred in the past. Settled in the 1860s as a "Wild West" town, it became for a time a place where German immigrants grew sugar beets. In the 1990s, the population was about a dozen people, but it had declined to just 2 people by 2010.

The community was named for Joe Messex, a railroad official.
