= Tyus, Perm Krai =

Tyus Тюсь
- Settlement
- Location within Perm Krai Location within Russia
- Coordinates: 58°34′N 56°26′E
- Country: Russia
- Region: Perm Krai
- District: Dobryansky District
- Time zone: UTC+5:00

Tyus (Russian: Тюсь) is a rural locality (a settlement) in Dobryansky District, Perm Krai, Russia. The population was 19 as of 2010. There are 3 streets.

== Geography ==
Tyus is located 14 km north of Dobryanka (the district's administrative centre) by road. Zavozhik is the nearest rural locality.
