= Tyus, Georgia =

Unincorporated community in Georgia, U.S.

Coordinates: 33°28′03″N 85°12′08″W

Tyus is an unincorporated community in Carroll County, in the U.S. state of Georgia.

== History ==
A post office called Tyus was established in 1892, and remained in operation until 1905. The community was named after Jackson "Jack" Buchanan Tyus, a local merchant.
