= K-19 (Kansas highway) =

State highway in Kansas, U.S.

K-19
- K-19 in red, K-19 Spur in blue

Route information
- Maintained by KDOT
- Length: 33.915 mi (54.581 km)
- Existed: 1926–present

Major junctions
- South end: US-50 in Belpre
- East end: US-281 east of Seward

Location
- Country: United States
- State: Kansas
- Counties: Edwards, Pawnee, Stafford

Highway system
- Kansas State Highway System; Interstate; US; State; Spurs
← K-18	→ K-20

K-19 is a 33.915-mile-long (54.581 km) state highway in the U.S. state of Kansas. From U.S. Route 50 (US-50) to K-19 Spur it is signed as north–south and from K-19 Spur to US-281 it is signed as east–west. K-19's southern terminus is at US-50 in Belpre, and the eastern terminus is at US-281 east of Seward.

Before state highways were numbered in Kansas, there were auto trails. The southern terminus follows the former New Santa Fe Trail. The northern terminus of K-19 Spur follows the former National Old Trails Road and Old Santa Fe Trail. K-19 was first designated in 1926, and at that time started in Belpre and ended in Larned. Then between 1931 and 1932, K-19 was extended east, from south of Larned, along the former K-37 designation to K-8, now US-281.

== Route description ==
K-19 runs north–south for its first 15.1 miles (24.3 km), and east–west for its final 18.8 miles (30.3 km). The first leg begins at US-50 in Belpre and near the Arkansas River south of Larned, K-19 turns east for its second leg, bypassing both Radium and Seward to the south before ending at US-281.

K-19 begins at US-50 in Belpre and shortly crosses an Amtrak track then leaves Belpre. It then continues northward for three miles (4.8 km) through flat rural farmlands before entering into Pawnee County. Approximately four miles (6.4 km) north of the county line it crosses Pickle Creek, a tributary of the Arkansas River, and passes Zook. From there it continues northward for roughly seven miles (11 km) then reaches the terminus of K-19 Spur. At this point it is redesignated as an east–west route. K-19 Spur crosses the Arkansas River and ends about 0.8 miles (1.3 km) later at US-56 in Larned.

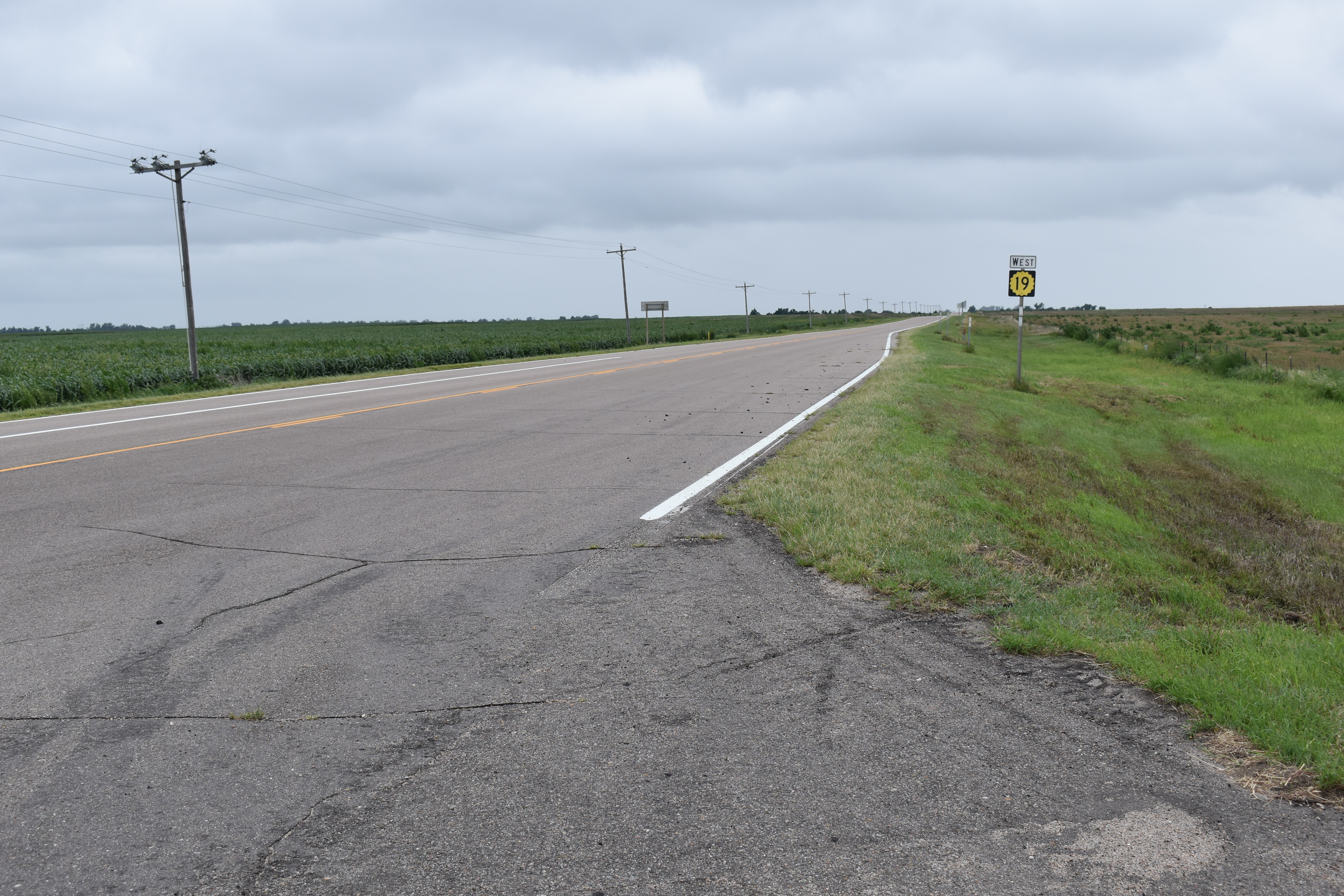
K-19 westbound at 40th Avenue in Pawnee County

From K-19 Spur, K-19 travels eastward for about 5.5 miles (8.9 km) before crossing Pickle Creek again. From there it continues eastward for roughly another 4.5 miles (7.2 km) and crosses into Stafford County, traveling south of Radium 1 mile (1.6 km) after crossing the county line. After roughly another 5.5 miles (8.9 km) it reaches the terminus of the former K-219, a .995-mile-long (1.601 km) spur that served Seward until it was decommissioned in 2013. It then continues another 2.5 miles (4.0 km) and reaches its eastern terminus at US-281.

The Kansas Department of Transportation (KDOT) tracks the traffic levels on its highways, and in 2017, they determined that on average the traffic varied from 540 vehicles per day at the terminus of former K-219 to 1390 vehicles per day slightly south of the terminus of K-19 Spur. K-19 is not included in the National Highway System. The National Highway System is a system of highways important to the nation's defense, economy, and mobility. K-19 does connect to the National Highway System at each terminus, US-50 and US-281, as well as to US-56 via K-19 Spur.

== History ==
Prior to the formation of the Kansas state highway system, there were auto trails, which were an informal network of marked routes that existed in the United States and Canada in the early part of the 20th century. The southern terminus follows the former New Santa Fe Trail. The northern terminus of K-19 Spur follows the former National Old Trails Road and Old Santa Fe Trail.

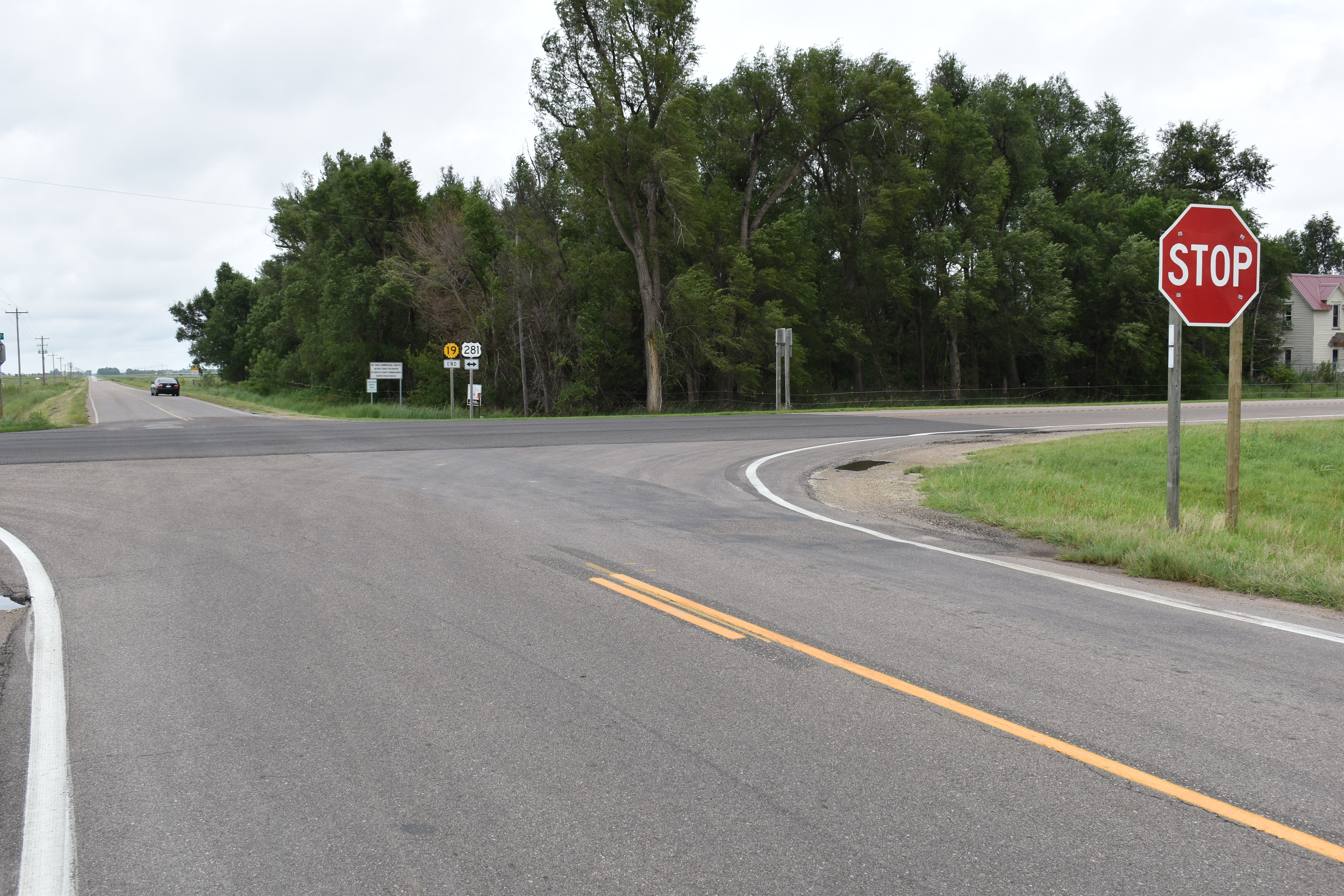
Eastern terminus at US-281

K-19 was first designated as a state highway in 1926, and at that time ran from US-250 in Belpre northward to K-37 by Larned. Also at that time the segment from K-19 Spur eastward to then K-8 was designated as K-37. By 1927, US-250 was renumbered to US-50S. Between 1931 and 1932, the K-37 designation was removed and K-19 was extended along its old alignment to K-8 which later became US-281. In 1956, K-19 was extended .4 miles (640 m) southward in Edwards County when US-50, at the time US-50S, was slightly realigned within Belpre. In Pawnee County, K-19 was slightly realigned just south of K-19 Spur to eliminate some sharp curves. The right of way for this relocation from Zook to K-19 Spur was purchased in Spring of 1959. In 1958, the Larned Chamber of Commerce proposed to extend K-19 east 30 miles (48 km) to a junction with K-14 and K-96. This was never implemented.

In Stafford County, K-19 originally turned north on present day Radium Road towards Radium, then followed NW 150th Street east to end at US-281, passing just to the south of Seward along the way. In a September 25, 1946 resolution, the turn to the north at Radium Road was eliminated and K-19 was realigned to continue eastward to its current eastern terminus.

== Major junctions ==
County	Location	mi	km	Destinations	Notes
Edwards	Belpre	0.000	0.000	US-50 – Hutchinson, Kinsley	Southern terminus
Pawnee	Pleasant Grove Township	15.142	24.369	K-19 Spur north (Broadway Street) – Larned	Southern terminus of K-19 Spur; K-19 changes from south–north to west–east
Stafford	South Seward Township	33.915	54.581	US-281 – Great Bend, St. John	Eastern terminus
1.000 mi = 1.609 km; 1.000 km = 0.621 mi

== K-19 Spur ==
K-19 Spur
- Location: Larned
- Length: 0.800 mi (1,287 m)
- Existed: c. 1932–present

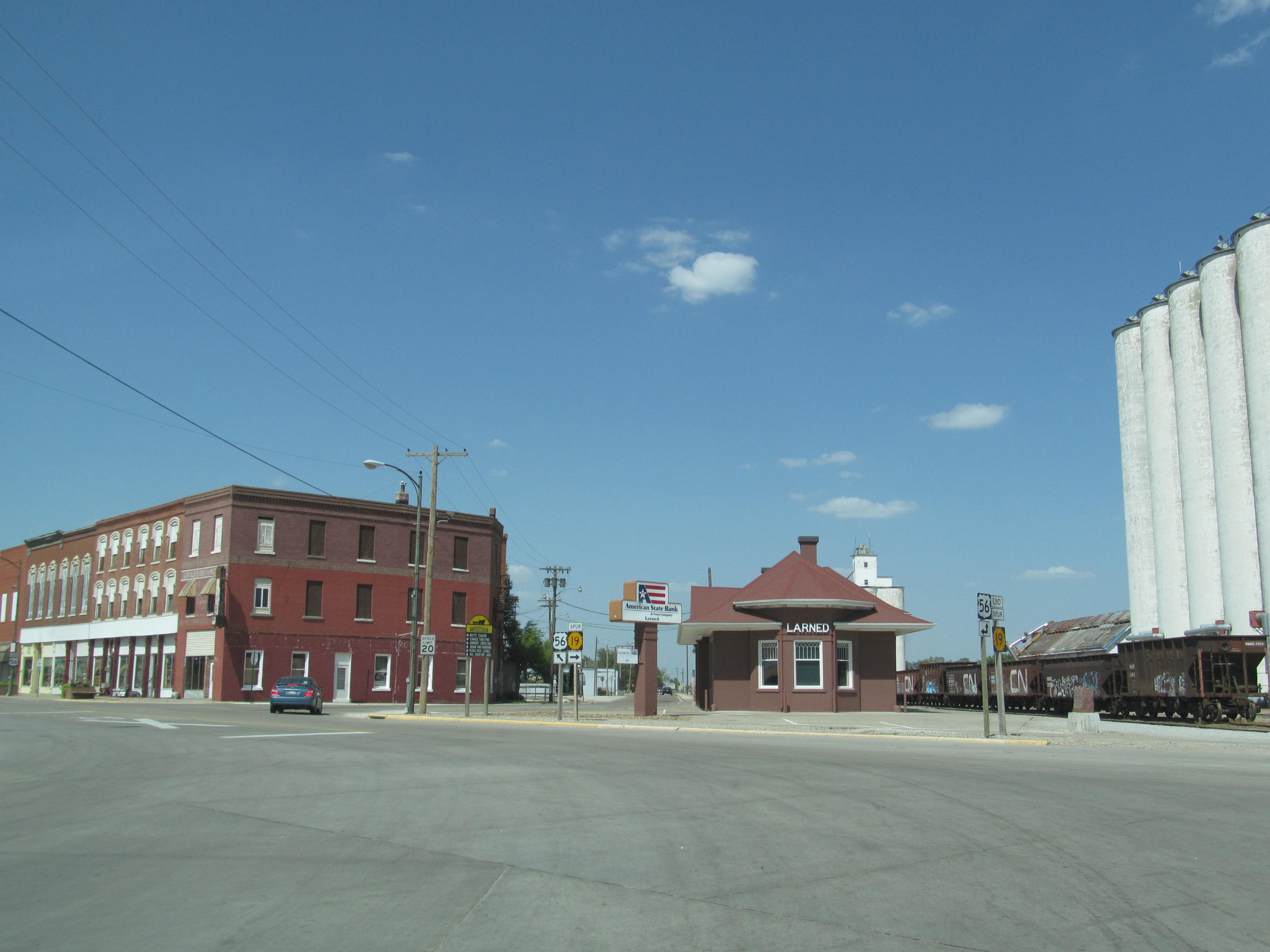
Northern terminus of K-19 Spur

K-19 Spur is a 0.8-mile-long (1.3 km) spur route of K-19. K-19 Spur begins at an intersection with K-19, just south of where it crosses the Arkansas River, and travels northward to US-56 in Larned. 2017 AADT on K-19 Spur was 2650 vehicles per day. The section of K-19 Spur within Larned is maintained by the city.

=== Major junctions ===
The entire route is in Pawnee County.

Location	mi	km	Destinations	Notes
Pleasant Grove Township	0.000	0.000	K-19 to US-281 – Belpre	Southern terminus
Larned	0.800	1.287	US-56 – Great Bend, Kinsley	Northern terminus
1.000 mi = 1.609 km; 1.000 km = 0.621 mi

== See also ==
- List of state highways in Kansas
- List of state highway spurs in Kansas
