= Pleasant Valley Township, Pawnee County, Kansas =

Township in Pawnee County, Kansas, U.S.

Pleasant Valley Township
- Township
- Location within Pawnee County
- Coordinates: 38.043642°N 99.077062°W
- Country: United States
- State: Kansas
- County: Pawnee
- Established: 1876

Government
  - Commissioner, District 3: Bob Rein, Jr.

Area
  - Total: 36.136 sq mi (93.59 km^{2})
  - Land: 36.136 sq mi (93.59 km^{2})
  - Water: 0 sq mi (0 km^{2}) 0%
- Elevation: 2,054 ft (626 m)

Population (2020)
  - Total: 80
  - Density: 2.2/sq mi (0.85/km^{2})
- Time zone: UTC-6 (CST)
  - Summer (DST): UTC-5 (CDT)
- Area code: 620
- GNIS feature ID: 473557

Pleasant Valley Township is a township in Pawnee County, Kansas, United States. As of the 2020 census, its population was 80.

== History ==
Pleasant Valley Township was established in 1876. It was first called Plum Township before being renamed. The area that is now Valley Center Township was detached from Pleasant Valley Township in 1903.

== Geography ==
Pleasant Valley Township covers an area of 36.136 square miles (93.59 square kilometers).

=== Communities ===
- Zook

=== Adjacent townships ===
Pleasant Grove Township, Pawnee County
| Santa Fe Township, Pawnee County | northwest | north | northeast | Logan Township, Pawnee County |
| Orange Township, Pawnee County | west | self | east | Valley Center Township, Pawnee County |
| | | south | southeast | Farmington Township, Stafford County |
Belpre Township, Edwards County

== Transportation ==
=== Major highways ===
- K-19
