= Pawnee Township, Pawnee County, Kansas =

Township in Pawnee County, Kansas, U.S.

Pawnee Township
- Township
- Location within Pawnee County
- Coordinates: 38.223473°N 99.176484°W
- Country: United States
- State: Kansas
- County: Pawnee

Government
  - Commissioner, District 2: Brock Miller

Area
  - Total: 35.735 sq mi (92.55 km^{2})
  - Land: 35.712 sq mi (92.49 km^{2})
  - Water: 0.023 sq mi (0.060 km^{2}) 0.06%
- Elevation: 2,077 ft (633 m)

Population (2020)
  - Total: 649
  - Density: 18.2/sq mi (7.02/km^{2})
- Time zone: UTC-6 (CST)
  - Summer (DST): UTC-5 (CDT)
- Area code: 620
- GNIS feature ID: 475730

Pawnee Township is a township in Pawnee County, Kansas, United States. As of the 2020 census, its population was 649.

== History ==
Part of Pawnee Township was detached to form Morton Township in the 1910s.

== Geography ==
Pawnee Township covers an area of 35.735 square miles (92.55 square kilometers). The Pawnee River flows through it. The township is home to Fort Larned National Historic Site.

=== Adjacent townships ===
Ash Valley Township, Pawnee County
		north	northeast	Walnut Township, Pawnee County
Morton Township, Pawnee County	west	self	east	Larned Township, Pawnee County
Pleasant Ridge Township, Pawnee County	southwest	south	southeast	Pleasant Grove Township, Pawnee County
Santa Fe Township, Pawnee County

== Transportation ==
=== Major highways ===
- K-156
