= Pleasant Ridge Township, Kansas =

Township in Pawnee County, Kansas, U.S.

Pleasant Ridge Township
- Township
- Location within Pawnee County
- Coordinates: 38.135791°N 99.290593°W
- Country: United States
- State: Kansas
- County: Pawnee
- Established: 1878

Government
  - Commissioner, District 2: Brock Miller

Area
  - Total: 36.005 sq mi (93.25 km^{2})
  - Land: 35.998 sq mi (93.23 km^{2})
  - Water: 0.007 sq mi (0.018 km^{2}) 0.02%
- Elevation: 2,090 ft (640 m)

Population (2020)
  - Total: 43
  - Density: 1.2/sq mi (0.46/km^{2})
- Time zone: UTC-6 (CST)
  - Summer (DST): UTC-5 (CDT)
- Area code: 620
- GNIS feature ID: 475842

Pleasant Ridge Township is a township in Pawnee County, Kansas, United States. As of the 2020 census, its population was 43.

== History ==
Pleasant Ridge Township was established in 1878.

== Geography ==
Pleasant Ridge Township covers an area of 36.005 square miles (93.25 square kilometers). The Pawnee River flows through it.

=== Adjacent townships ===
Morton Township, Pawnee County
Grant Township, Pawnee County	northwest	north	northeast	Pawnee Township, Pawnee County
Keysville Township, Pawnee County	west	self	east	Santa Fe Township, Pawnee County
Logan Township, Edwards County	southwest	south	southeast	Orange Township, Pawnee County
Garfield Township, Pawnee County

== Transportation ==
=== Major highways ===
- US-183
