= Camp Alert =

Camp Alert may refer to:

- Camp Alert (California), a Civil War Union post
- Camp on Pawnee Fork, later renamed Camp Alert and later moved to become Fort Larned, a United States Army frontier post
