= Garfield Township, Pawnee County, Kansas =

Township in Pawnee County, Kansas, U.S.

Garfield Township
- Township
- Location within Pawnee County
- Coordinates: 38.051048°N 99.278913°W
- Country: United States
- State: Kansas
- County: Pawnee

Government
  - Commissioner, District 2: Brock Miller

Area
  - Total: 35.844 sq mi (92.84 km^{2})
  - Land: 35.834 sq mi (92.81 km^{2})
  - Water: 0.01 sq mi (0.026 km^{2}) 0.03%
- Elevation: 2,097 ft (639 m)

Population (2020)
  - Total: 184
  - Density: 5.13/sq mi (1.98/km^{2})
- Time zone: UTC-6 (CST)
  - Summer (DST): UTC-5 (CDT)
- Area code: 620
- GNIS feature ID: 475936

Garfield Township is a township in Pawnee County, Kansas, United States. As of the 2020 census, its population was 184.

== Geography ==
Garfield Township covers an area of 35.844 square miles (92.84 square kilometers). The Arkansas River flows through it.

=== Communities ===
- part of Garfield

=== Adjacent townships ===
- Pleasant Ridge Township, Pawnee County (north)
- Santa Fe Township, Pawnee County (northeast)
- Orange Township, Pawnee County (east)
- Wayne Township, Edwards County (south)
- Kinsley Township, Edwards County (southwest)
- Logan Township, Edwards County (west)
- Keysville Township, Pawnee County (northwest)

== Transportation ==
=== Major highways ===
- US-56
- US-183
