= Orange Township, Pawnee County, Kansas =

Township in Pawnee County, Kansas, U.S.

Orange Township
- Township
- Location within Pawnee County
- Coordinates: 38.043509°N 99.186353°W
- Country: United States
- State: Kansas
- County: Pawnee

Government
  - Commissioner, District 2: Brock Miller

Area
  - Total: 35.635 sq mi (92.29 km^{2})
  - Land: 35.635 sq mi (92.29 km^{2})
  - Water: 0 sq mi (0 km^{2}) 0%
- Elevation: 2,093 ft (638 m)

Population (2020)
  - Total: 72
  - Density: 2.0/sq mi (0.78/km^{2})
- Time zone: UTC-6 (CST)
  - Summer (DST): UTC-5 (CDT)
- Area code: 620
- GNIS feature ID: 473556

Orange Township is a township in Pawnee County, Kansas, United States. As of the 2020 census, its population was 72.

== Geography ==
Orange Township covers an area of 35.635 square miles (92.29 square kilometers). The Arkansas River flows through it.

=== Communities ===
- part of Garfield

=== Adjacent townships ===
Santa Fe Township, Pawnee County
Pleasant Ridge Township, Pawnee County	northwest	north	northeast	Pleasant Grove Township, Pawnee County
Garfield Township, Pawnee County	west	self	east	Pleasant Valley Township, Pawnee County
Wayne Township, Edwards County	southwest		southeast	Belpre Township, Edwards County

== Transportation ==
=== Major highways ===
- US-56
