= Pleasant Grove Township, Pawnee County, Kansas =

Township in Pawnee County, Kansas, U.S.

Pleasant Grove Township
- Township
- Location within Pawnee County
- Coordinates: 38.123584°N 99.067922°W
- Country: United States
- State: Kansas
- County: Pawnee

Government
  - Commissioner, District 3: Bob Rein, Jr.

Area
  - Total: 35.818 sq mi (92.77 km^{2})
  - Land: 35.738 sq mi (92.56 km^{2})
  - Water: 0.08 sq mi (0.21 km^{2}) 0.22%
- Elevation: 2,041 ft (622 m)

Population (2020)
  - Total: 162
  - Density: 4.53/sq mi (1.75/km^{2})
- Time zone: UTC-6 (CST)
  - Summer (DST): UTC-5 (CDT)
- Area code: 620
- GNIS feature ID: 475851

Pleasant Grove Township is a township in Pawnee County, Kansas, United States. As of the 2020 census, its population was 162.

== Geography ==
Pleasant Grove Township covers an area of 35.818 square miles (92.77 square kilometers). The Pawnee River and Arkansas River flow through it.

=== Adjacent townships ===
Larned Township, Pawnee County
Pawnee Township, Pawnee County	northwest	north	northeast	River Township, Pawnee County
Santa Fe Township, Pawnee County	west	self	east	Logan Township, Pawnee County
Orange Township, Pawnee County	southwest	south	southeast	Valley Center Township, Pawnee County
Pleasant Valley Township, Pawnee County

== Transportation ==
=== Major highways ===
- US-56
- K-19
