= Santa Fe Township, Kansas =

Civil township in Pawnee County, Kansas, United States

Santa Fe Township Pawnee County, Kansas
- Township
- Location within Pawnee County
- Coordinates: 38°07′50″N 99°11′11″W
- Country: United States
- State: Kansas
- County: Pawnee

Government
  - Commissioner, District 2: Brock Miller

Area
  - Total: 35.629 sq mi (92.28 km^{2})
  - Land: 35.629 sq mi (92.28 km^{2})
  - Water: 0 sq mi (0 km^{2}) 0%
- Elevation: 2,031 ft (619 m)

Population (2020)
  - Total: 184
  - Density: 5.16/sq mi (1.99/km^{2})
- Time zone: UTC-6 (CST)
  - Summer (DST): UTC-5 (CDT)
- Area code: 620
- FIPS code: 20-63025
- GNIS ID: 475849

Santa Fe Township is a township in Pawnee County, Kansas, United States. As of the 2020 Census, it had a population of 184.

== Geography ==
Santa Fe Township covers an area of 35.644 square miles (92.28 square kilometers). The Pawnee River flows through it.

=== Adjacent townships ===
Pawnee Township, Pawnee County
Morton Township, Pawnee County	northwest	north	northeast	Larned Township, Pawnee County
Pleasant Ridge Township, Pawnee County	west	self	east	Pleasant Grove Township, Pawnee County
Garfield Township, Pawnee County	southwest	south	southeast	Pleasant Valley Township, Pawnee County
Orange Township, Pawnee County

== Transportation ==
=== Major highways ===
- US-56
