= Valley Center Township, Pawnee County, Kansas =

Township in Pawnee County, Kansas, U.S.

Valley Center Township
- Township
- Location within Pawnee County
- Coordinates: 38.051089°N 98.958945°W
- Country: United States
- State: Kansas
- County: Pawnee
- Established: 1903

Government
  - Commissioner, District 2: Brock Miller

Area
  - Total: 35.675 sq mi (92.40 km^{2})
  - Land: 35.651 sq mi (92.34 km^{2})
  - Water: 0.024 sq mi (0.062 km^{2}) 0.07%
- Elevation: 2,034 ft (620 m)

Population (2020)
  - Total: 20
  - Density: 0.56/sq mi (0.22/km^{2})
- Time zone: UTC-6 (CST)
  - Summer (DST): UTC-5 (CDT)
- Area code: 620
- GNIS feature ID: 475943

Valley Center Township is a township in Pawnee County, Kansas, United States. As of the 2020 census, its population was 20.

== History ==
Valley Center Township was created from part of Pleasant Valley Township in the 1903.

== Geography ==
Valley Center Township covers an area of 35.675 square miles (92.40 square kilometers).

=== Adjacent townships ===
Logan Township, Pawnee County
Pleasant Grove Township, Pawnee County	northwest	north	northeast	Douglas Township, Stafford County
Pleasant Valley Township, Pawnee County	west	self	east	Cleveland Township, Stafford County
Belpre Township, Edwards County	southwest	south	southeast	Richland Township, Stafford County
Farmington Township, Stafford County
