= Morton Township, Pawnee County, Kansas =

Township in Pawnee County, Kansas, U.S.

Morton Township
- Township
- Location within Pawnee County
- Coordinates: 38.218191°N 99.296097°W
- Country: United States
- State: Kansas
- County: Pawnee

Government
  - Commissioner, District 2: Brock Miller

Area
  - Total: 35.668 sq mi (92.38 km^{2})
  - Land: 35.668 sq mi (92.38 km^{2})
  - Water: 0 sq mi (0 km^{2}) 0%
- Elevation: 2,093 ft (638 m)

Population (2020)
  - Total: 31
  - Density: 0.87/sq mi (0.34/km^{2})
- Time zone: UTC-6 (CST)
  - Summer (DST): UTC-5 (CDT)
- Area code: 620
- GNIS feature ID: 475727

Morton Township is a township in Pawnee County, Kansas, United States. As of the 2020 census, its population was 31.

== History ==
Morton Township was created from part of Pawnee Township in the 1910s.

== Geography ==
Morton Township covers an area of 35.668 square miles (92.38 square kilometers). The Pawnee River flows through it.

=== Adjacent townships ===
Conkling Township, Pawnee County
		north	northeast	Ash Valley Township, Pawnee County
Grant Township, Pawnee County	west	self	east	Pawnee Township, Pawnee County
Keysville Township, Pawnee County	southwest	south	southeast	Santa Fe Township, Pawnee County
Pleasant Ridge Township, Pawnee County

== Transportation ==
=== Major highways ===
- US-183
- K-156
