= Mitch Webster =

American baseball player (born 1959)

- Outfielder
- Born: May 16, 1959 (age 67); Larned, Kansas, U.S.
- Batted: Switch Threw: Left

MLB debut
- September 2, 1983, for the Toronto Blue Jays

Last MLB appearance
- October 1, 1995, for the Los Angeles Dodgers

MLB statistics
- Batting average: .263
- Home runs: 70
- Runs batted in: 342
- Stats at Baseball Reference

Teams
- Toronto Blue Jays (1983–1985); Montreal Expos (1985–1988); Chicago Cubs (1988–1989); Cleveland Indians (1990–1991); Pittsburgh Pirates (1991); Los Angeles Dodgers (1991–1995)

Mitchell Dean Webster (born May 16, 1959) is an American former outfielder in Major League Baseball who played from 1983 through 1995 for the Toronto Blue Jays, Montreal Expos, Chicago Cubs, Cleveland Indians, Pittsburgh Pirates and Los Angeles Dodgers. Listed at 6' 0", 185 lb., he was a switch hitter and threw left handed.

== Playing career ==
Born in Larned, Kansas, Webster was selected by the Dodgers in the 23rd round of the 1977 MLB draft. He then was selected by Toronto from Los Angeles in the 1979 Minor League draft. In 1986 with Montreal, he posted career-highs with a .290 batting average and 36 stolen bases while leading the National League with 13 triples. He is one of the few players to play for both major league Canadian teams, the Toronto Blue Jays and the Montreal Expos.

Webster's 1990 season with the Cleveland Indians featured a bench clearing incident between Webster and Todd Stottlemyre of the Toronto Blue Jays. In the action, Webster charged the mound but was tackled by Stottlemyre and catcher Pat Borders. In a 13-season career, Webster slashed .263/.330/.401 with 70 home runs and 160 steals in 1,265 games, driving in 342 runs and scoring 504 times while playing mostly as a leadoff hitter. As an outfielder, he committed 42 errors in 2,007 fielding chances for a .979 fielding percentage.

== Post-playing career ==
Webster scouted during 14 years with the Dodgers organization, serving for eight seasons as an amateur scout before working in 2008 and 2009 as a professional scout. He also spent four seasons as a coach in the Dodgers minor league system from 1996 to 1999. In 2009, the Kansas City Royals named Webster as their Midwest Regional Scouting Supervisor. He was named to the Kansas Sports Hall of Fame in 2018.

== See also ==
- List of Major League Baseball annual triples leaders
- List of Major League Baseball career stolen bases leaders
