= Zook, Kansas =

Unincorporated community in Pawnee County, Kansas

Coordinates: 38°03′28″N 99°05′13″W

Zook is an unincorporated community in Pawnee County, Kansas, United States. It is located approximately eight miles south of Larned, east of the intersection of K-19 highway and East Road.

== History ==
The community was started by the Mennonite John Zook, who came to Larned, Kansas, in the 1880s and then moved his family to the location that would become Zook, a mile east of what is now Highway 19 in southeastern Pawnee County.

The community grew in population when the Anthony and Northern Railroad came through the area. The region's first consolidated school was built in 1922, and by 1940 the town had "a school, church, grain elevator and filling station." The school closed for good in 1962.

== Notable people ==
- John Zook - NFL defensive end for eleven seasons and once named All-Pro; attended school in Zook.
