= Glee S. Smith Jr. =

American politician

Member of the Kansas Senate
- In office 1957–1973

Personal details
- Born: Glee Sidney Smith Jr. April 29, 1921 Rozel, Kansas, U.S.
- Died: November 16, 2015 (aged 94) Lawrence, Kansas, U.S.
- Party: Republican
- Spouse: Geraldine Buhler (m. 1943)
- Children: 3
- Education: University of Kansas
- Profession: lawyer

Glee Sidney Smith Jr. (April 29, 1921 – November 16, 2015) was an American politician, lawyer, and businessman.

== Career ==
He was a member of the Kansas Senate from 1957 to 1973 and was a Republican; during his term he was Chairman of the Senate Judiciary Committee, Chairman of the Senate Ways and Means Committee, and President pro tempore (1965–1973). He served on the Larned, Kansas Board of Education and was president of the board. Smith was involved with the banking and insurance businesses. Smith also served an appointment by President Gerald Ford to the Board of the National Legal Services Corporation from 1975 to 1985.

== Education ==
He received his bachelor's degree in journalism, in 1943 from the University of Kansas and his law degree from the University of Kansas School of Law, in 1947; Smith was admitted to the Kansas Bar in 1947. He was also a veteran of the United States Army Air Forces and World War II. He was a member of the Kansas Bar Association.

== Death ==
Smith died on November 16, 2015, in Lawrence, Kansas.
