= Frizell, Kansas =

Unincorporated community in Pawnee County, Kansas

Coordinates: 38°09′58″N 99°12′51″W

Frizell is an unincorporated community in Pawnee County, Kansas, United States.

== History ==
A post office was opened in Frizell in 1904, and remained in operation until it was discontinued in 1933.
