= Ash Valley, Kansas =

Unincorporated community in Pawnee County, Kansas

Coordinates: 38°18′18″N 99°12′59″W

Ash Valley is an unincorporated community in Pawnee County, Kansas, United States.

== History ==
A post office in Ash Valley once opened in 1877, closed in 1908, reopened in 1922, and closed permanently in 1941.

== Education ==
The community is served by Fort Larned USD 495 public school district.
