= Sanford, Kansas =

Unincorporated community in Pawnee County, Kansas

Coordinates: 38°10′50″N 99°18′51″W

Sanford is an unincorporated community in Pawnee County, Kansas, United States.

== History ==
A post office was opened in Sanford in 1909, and remained in operation until it was discontinued in 1954.
