= Camp on Pawnee Fork =

Camp on Pawnee Fork (1859-60); Camp Alert (1860)
- Pawnee County, Kansas

Site information
- Type: U.S. Army post
- Controlled by: U.S. Army

Location
- Coordinates: 38°10′26″N 99°09′53″W

Site history
- Built: September to November 1859
- In use: September 1, 1859, to May 1860
- Materials: tents, wood, sod

Garrison information
- Past commanders: Capt. George H. Steuart, Lieut. David Bell, Capt. Henry Wessels
- Garrison: same

The Camp on Pawnee Fork, later renamed Camp Alert, was founded by the U.S. Army to protect a mail station being built at a site called Pawnee Fork. This station, on the Santa Fe Trail was threatened by Kiowa and Comanche Indians who wanted the site left vacant. The first company of cavalry troops arrived Sept. 1, 1859.

On October 4, Capt. George H. Steuart arrived with seventy-five cavalrymen, possibly adding to the original force. At this time the camp received its first name, Camp on Pawnee Fork. The Army found the site of the Camp very suitable for its escort protection needs, as it was located on an isolated stretch of the Santa Fe Trail. Steuart was to protect the mail station, escort mail trains along about a 140 miles (230 km) stretch of the Santa Fe Trail and Lieut. David Bell, was reduced to thirty men.

Since Bell had fewer horses, his force was not able to escort all the mail coaches. The men spent much time remaining alert for unfriendly Indians and because of this, the name of the post was changed to Camp Alert on February 1, 1860. On May 4 Capt. Henry Wessels, the new post commander, arrived with more troops, increasing garrison to 160 men. Wessels looked for a better site for the post and moved it 3 miles (4.8 km) upstream, to the west. On May 29 the post was renamed Fort Larned. The old site of Camp Alert was never again used.
