= Rozel, Kansas =

City in Pawnee County, Kansas, United States

- City
- Location within Pawnee County and Kansas

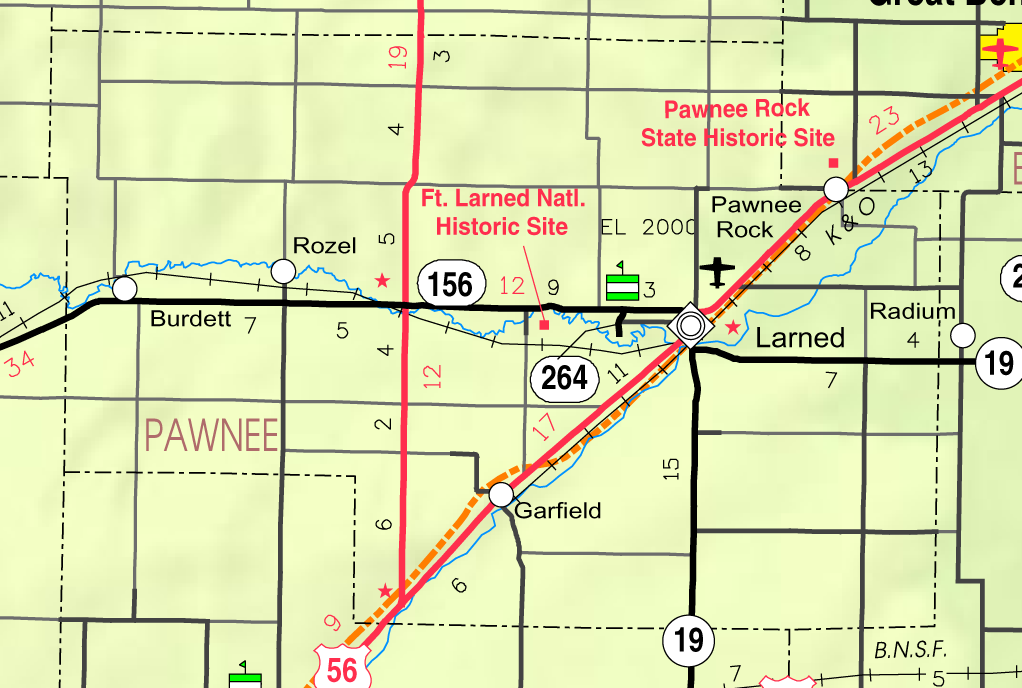
- KDOT map of Pawnee County (legend)
- Coordinates: 38°11′43″N 99°24′12″W
- Country: United States
- State: Kansas
- County: Pawnee
- Founded: 1890s
- Incorporated: 1929
- Named for: Roseila

Area
  - Total: 0.19 sq mi (0.50 km^{2})
  - Land: 0.19 sq mi (0.50 km^{2})
  - Water: 0 sq mi (0.00 km^{2})
- Elevation: 2,074 ft (632 m)

Population (2020)
  - Total: 102
  - Density: 530/sq mi (200/km^{2})
- Time zone: UTC-6 (CST)
  - Summer (DST): UTC-5 (CDT)
- ZIP Code: 67574
- Area code: 620
- FIPS code: 20-61600
- GNIS ID: 2396445
- Website: rozelcity.org

Rozel is a city in Pawnee County, Kansas, United States. As of the 2020 census, the population of the city was 102.

== History ==
The first post office in Rozel was established in 1893. The community was named in honor of Roseila, the daughter of a businessman.

== Geography ==
According to the United States Census Bureau, the city has a total area of 0.17 square miles (0.44 km^{2}), all land.

== Demographics ==
Historical population
| Census | Pop. | Note | %± |
|---|---|---|---|
| 1930 | 220 | | — |
| 1940 | 203 | | −7.7% |
| 1950 | 233 | | 14.8% |
| 1960 | 207 | | −11.2% |
| 1970 | 236 | | 14.0% |
| 1980 | 219 | | −7.2% |
| 1990 | 187 | | −14.6% |
| 2000 | 182 | | −2.7% |
| 2010 | 156 | | −14.3% |
| 2020 | 102 | | −34.6% |
U.S. Decennial Census

=== 2010 census ===
As of the census of 2010, there were 156 people, 66 households, and 43 families residing in the city. The population density was 917.6 inhabitants per square mile (354.3/km^{2}). There were 85 housing units at an average density of 500.0 per square mile (193.1/km^{2}). The racial makeup of the city was 100.0% White. Hispanic or Latino of any race were 4.5% of the population.

There were 66 households, of which 24.2% had children under the age of 18 living with them, 60.6% were married couples living together, 1.5% had a female householder with no husband present, 3.0% had a male householder with no wife present, and 34.8% were non-families. 31.8% of all households were made up of individuals, and 13.7% had someone living alone who was 65 years of age or older. The average household size was 2.36 and the average family size was 3.02.

The median age in the city was 44.5 years. 23.1% of residents were under the age of 18; 6.3% were between the ages of 18 and 24; 21.2% were from 25 to 44; 30.8% were from 45 to 64; and 18.6% were 65 years of age or older. The gender makeup of the city was 51.3% male and 48.7% female.

=== 2000 census ===
As of the census of 2000, there were 182 people, 72 households, and 48 families residing in the city. The population density was 825.4 inhabitants per square mile (318.7/km^{2}). There were 86 housing units at an average density of 390.0 per square mile (150.6/km^{2}). The racial makeup of the city was 96.70% White, 0.55% from other races, and 2.75% from two or more races. Hispanic or Latino of any race were 1.10% of the population.

There were 72 households, out of which 33.3% had children under the age of 18 living with them, 58.3% were married couples living together, 6.9% had a female householder with no husband present, and 33.3% were non-families. 31.9% of all households were made up of individuals, and 15.3% had someone living alone who was 65 years of age or older. The average household size was 2.53 and the average family size was 3.25.

In the city, the population was spread out, with 31.3% under the age of 18, 7.1% from 18 to 24, 24.2% from 25 to 44, 20.9% from 45 to 64, and 16.5% who were 65 years of age or older. The median age was 35 years. For every 100 females, there were 83.8 males. For every 100 females age 18 and over, there were 86.6 males.

The median income for a household in the city was $33,750, and the median income for a family was $45,893. Males had a median income of $25,833 versus $21,875 for females. The per capita income for the city was $14,151. About 6.1% of families and 8.6% of the population were below the poverty line, including 11.3% of those under the age of eighteen and 6.3% of those 65 or over.

== Education ==
The community is served by Pawnee Heights USD 496 public school district. The Pawnee Heights High School mascot is Tigers.

Rozel High School was closed through school unification. The Rozel Tigers won the Kansas State High School boys class BB basketball championship in 1959 and the boys class B basketball championship in 1960.

== Notable people ==
- Gary Patterson, former head football coach at TCU
- Glee Smith, Jr., Kansas state legislator and lawyer

== See also ==
- Pawnee River
- Tornado outbreak of May 18–21, 2013
