= Radium, Kansas =

City in Stafford County, Kansas

- City
- Location within Stafford County and Kansas

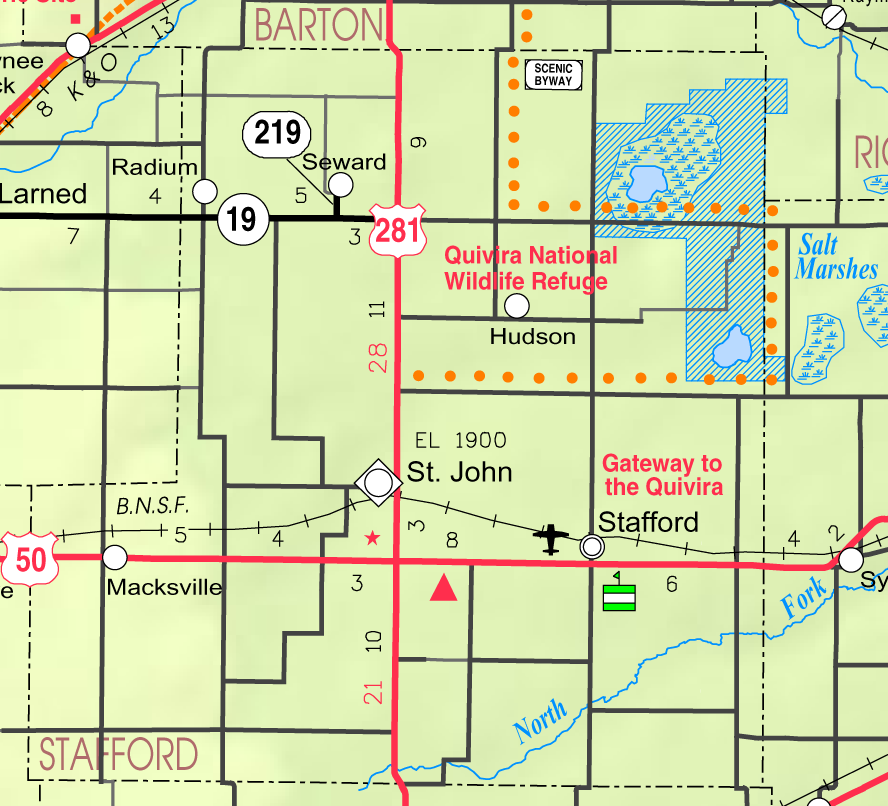
- KDOT map of Stafford County (legend)
- Coordinates: 38°10′26″N 98°53′40″W
- Country: United States
- State: Kansas
- County: Stafford
- Founded: 1900s
- Incorporated: 1934

Area
  - Total: 0.042 sq mi (0.11 km^{2})
  - Land: 0.042 sq mi (0.11 km^{2})
  - Water: 0 sq mi (0.00 km^{2})
- Elevation: 1,949 ft (594 m)

Population (2020)
  - Total: 26
  - Density: 610/sq mi (240/km^{2})
- Time zone: UTC-6 (CST)
  - Summer (DST): UTC-5 (CDT)
- ZIP Code: 67550
- Area code: 620
- FIPS code: 20-58300
- GNIS ID: 2396306

Radium is a city in Stafford County, Kansas, United States. As of the 2020 census, the population of the city was 26.

== History ==
A post office was opened in Radium in 1910, and remained in operation until it was discontinued in 1990.

== Geography ==
According to the United States Census Bureau, the city has a total area of 0.04 square miles (0.10 km^{2}), all land.

== Demographics ==
Historical population
Census	Pop.	Note	%±
1940	85		—
1950	64		−24.7%
1960	64		0.0%
1970	55		−14.1%
1980	47		−14.5%
1990	47		0.0%
2000	40		−14.9%
2010	25		−37.5%
2020	26		4.0%
U.S. Decennial Census

=== 2020 census ===
The 2020 United States census counted 26 people, 13 households, and 7 families in Radium. The population density was 634.1 per square mile (244.8/km^{2}). There were 16 housing units at an average density of 390.2 per square mile (150.7/km^{2}). The racial makeup was 76.92% (20) white or European American (76.92% non-Hispanic white), 7.69% (2) black or African-American, 0.0% (0) Native American or Alaska Native, 0.0% (0) Asian, 0.0% (0) Pacific Islander or Native Hawaiian, 0.0% (0) from other races, and 15.38% (4) from two or more races. Hispanic or Latino of any race was 0.0% (0) of the population.

Of the 13 households, 15.4% had children under the age of 18; 38.5% were married couples living together; 30.8% had a female householder with no spouse or partner present. 30.8% of households consisted of individuals and 15.4% had someone living alone who was 65 years of age or older. The average household size was 1.8 and the average family size was 3.0.

23.1% of the population was under the age of 18, 7.7% from 18 to 24, 15.4% from 25 to 44, 34.6% from 45 to 64, and 19.2% who were 65 years of age or older. The median age was 48.0 years. For every 100 females, there were 116.7 males. For every 100 females ages 18 and older, there were 81.8 males.

=== 2010 census ===
As of the census of 2010, there were 25 people, 15 households, and 7 families residing in the city. The population density was 625.0 inhabitants per square mile (241.3/km^{2}). There were 19 housing units at an average density of 475.0 per square mile (183.4/km^{2}). The racial makeup of the city was 96.0% White and 4.0% from two or more races.

There were 15 households, of which 13.3% had children under the age of 18 living with them, 46.7% were married couples living together, and 53.3% were non-families. 53.3% of all households were made up of individuals. The average household size was 1.67 and the average family size was 2.29.

The median age in the city was 53.2 years. 12% of residents were under the age of 18; 8% were between the ages of 18 and 24; 16% were from 25 to 44; 56% were from 45 to 64; and 8% were 65 years of age or older. The gender makeup of the city was 56.0% male and 44.0% female.

== Education ==
The community is served by Macksville USD 351 public school district.
