= Garfield, Kansas =

City in Pawnee County, Kansas, United States

- City
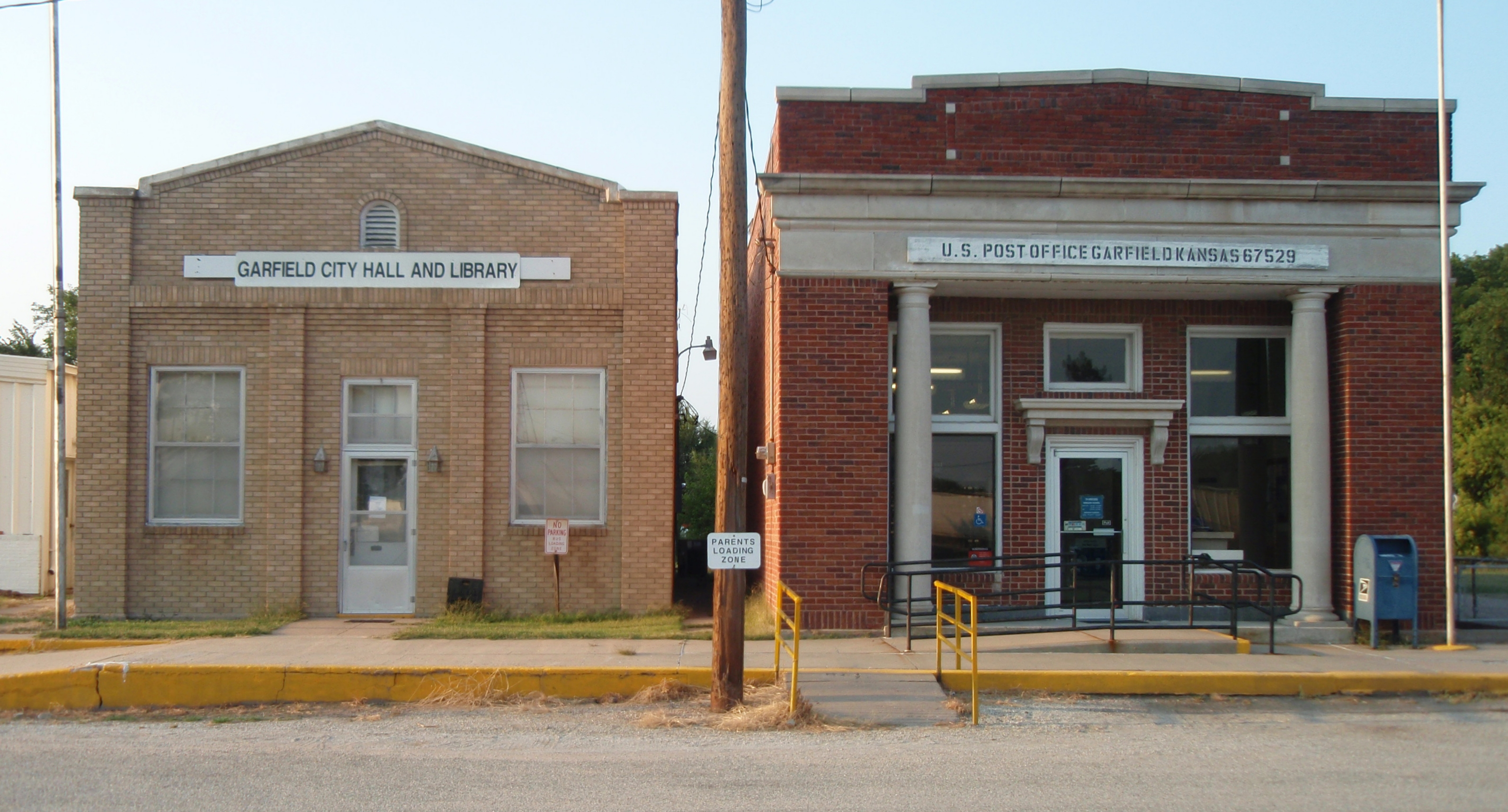
- City Hall, Library, Post Office (2009)

- Location within Pawnee County and Kansas

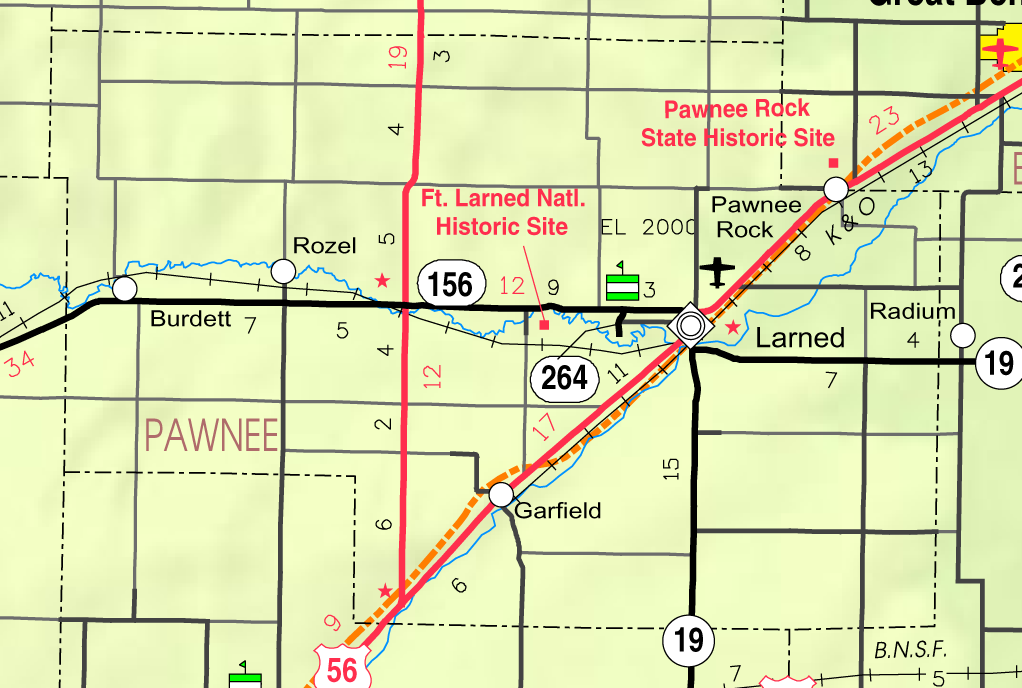
- KDOT map of Pawnee County (legend)
- Coordinates: 38°04′37″N 99°14′40″W
- Country: United States
- State: Kansas
- County: Pawnee
- Founded: 1870s
- Incorporated: 1910
- Named for: James A. Garfield

Area
  - Total: 0.54 sq mi (1.39 km^{2})
  - Land: 0.54 sq mi (1.39 km^{2})
  - Water: 0 sq mi (0.00 km^{2})
- Elevation: 2,070 ft (630 m)

Population (2020)
  - Total: 151
  - Density: 281/sq mi (109/km^{2})
- Time zone: UTC-6 (CST)
  - Summer (DST): UTC-5 (CDT)
- ZIP Code: 67529
- Area code: 620
- FIPS code: 20-25750
- GNIS ID: 2394855

Garfield is a city in Pawnee County, Kansas, United States. As of the 2020 census, the population of the city was 151.

== History ==
Garfield is named for James A. Garfield, the 20th President of the United States.

The first post office in Garfield was established in 1873.

== Geography ==
According to the United States Census Bureau, the city has a total area of 0.54 square miles (1.40 km^{2}), all land.

== Demographics ==
Historical population
Census	Pop.	Note	%±
1910	333		—
1920	368		10.5%
1930	451		22.6%
1940	335		−25.7%
1950	297		−11.3%
1960	278		−6.4%
1970	261		−6.1%
1980	277		6.1%
1990	236		−14.8%
2000	198		−16.1%
2010	190		−4.0%
2020	151		−20.5%
U.S. Decennial Census

=== 2020 census ===
The 2020 United States census counted 151 people, 67 households, and 44 families in Garfield. The population density was 280.7 per square mile (108.4/km^{2}). There were 96 housing units at an average density of 178.4 per square mile (68.9/km^{2}). The racial makeup was 78.81% (119) white or European American (77.48% non-Hispanic white), 0.0% (0) black or African-American, 0.66% (1) Native American or Alaska Native, 0.0% (0) Asian, 0.0% (0) Pacific Islander or Native Hawaiian, 10.6% (16) from other races, and 9.93% (15) from two or more races. Hispanic or Latino of any race was 15.89% (24) of the population.

Of the 67 households, 25.4% had children under the age of 18; 46.3% were married couples living together; 26.9% had a female householder with no spouse or partner present. 28.4% of households consisted of individuals and 9.0% had someone living alone who was 65 years of age or older. The average household size was 2.6 and the average family size was 3.6. The percent of those with a bachelor's degree or higher was estimated to be 6.6% of the population.

22.5% of the population was under the age of 18, 5.3% from 18 to 24, 20.5% from 25 to 44, 35.1% from 45 to 64, and 16.6% who were 65 years of age or older. The median age was 48.3 years. For every 100 females, there were 118.8 males. For every 100 females ages 18 and older, there were 112.7 males.

The 2016–2020 5-year American Community Survey estimates show that the median household income was $48,750 (with a margin of error of +/- $20,148) and the median family income was $61,500 (+/- $21,653). Males had a median income of $50,500 (+/- $28,062) versus $27,813 (+/- $7,657) for females. The median income for those above 16 years old was $29,688 (+/- $13,471). Approximately, 20.8% of families and 27.0% of the population were below the poverty line, including 31.7% of those under the age of 18 and 0.0% of those ages 65 or over.

=== 2010 census ===
At the 2010 census, there were 190 people, 82 households and 49 families residing in the city. The population density was 351.9 per square mile (135.9/km^{2}). There were 102 housing units at an average density of 188.9 per square mile (72.9/km^{2}). The racial makeup was 92.6% White, 2.1% Native American, and 5.3% from two or more races. Hispanic or Latino of any race were 6.8% of the population.

There were 82 households, of which 17.1% had children under the age of 18 living with them, 52.4% were married couples living together, 6.1% had a female householder with no husband present, 1.2% had a male householder with no wife present, and 40.2% were non-families. 32.9% of all households were made up of individuals, and 21.9% had someone living alone who was 65 years of age or older. The average household size was 2.32 and the average family size was 2.90.

The median age was 49.4 years. 20.5% of residents were under the age of 18; 6.9% were between the ages of 18 and 24; 16.9% were from 25 to 44; 35.3% were from 45 to 64; and 20.5% were 65 years of age or older. The gender makeup of the city was 45.8% male and 54.2% female.

== Education ==
The community is served by Fort Larned USD 495 public school district.

== See also ==
- Santa Fe Trail
