= Logan Township, Edwards County, Kansas =

Logan Township
- Township
- Location in Edwards County
- Coordinates: 38°02′39″N 099°24′20″W
- Country: United States
- State: Kansas
- County: Edwards

Area
  - Total: 36 sq mi (93 km^{2})
  - Land: 36 sq mi (93 km^{2})
  - Water: 0 sq mi (0 km^{2}) 0%
- Elevation: 2,244 ft (684 m)

Population (2020)
  - Total: 27
  - Density: 0.75/sq mi (0.29/km^{2})
- GNIS feature ID: 0475932

Logan Township is a township in Edwards County, Kansas, United States. As of the 2020 census, its population was 27.

== Geography ==
Logan Township covers an area of 35.91 square miles (93.0 km^{2}) and contains no incorporated settlements. According to the USGS, it contains two cemeteries: Lutheran and Salem.
