= Fort Larned National Historic Site =

National Historic Site of the United States

- U.S. National Register of Historic Places
- U.S. Historic district
- U.S. National Historic Site
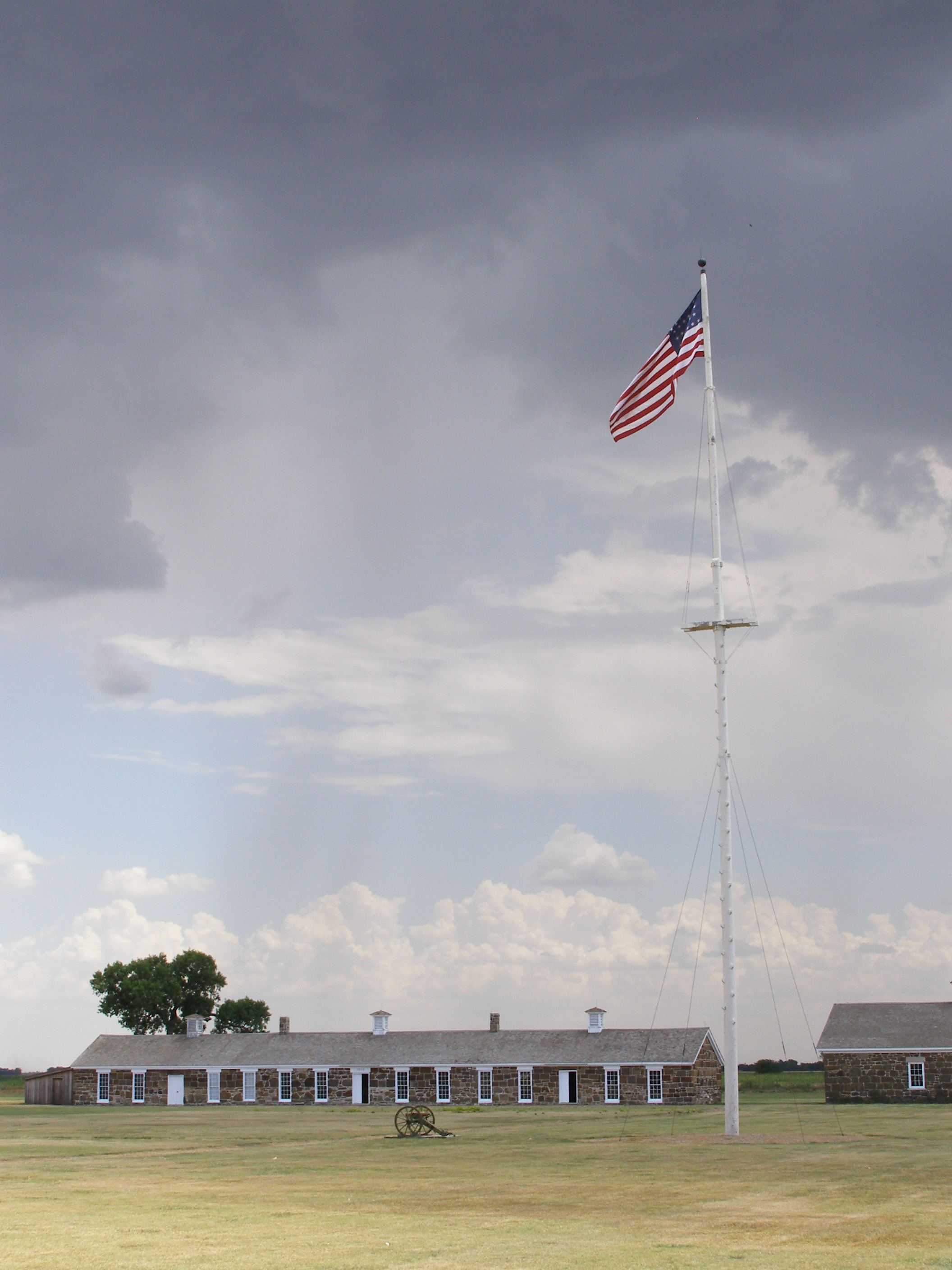
- Fort Larned Flagpole and Commissary Building

- Location within Kansas Location within the United States
- Location: Pawnee County, Kansas, Kansas route 156, USA
- Nearest city: Larned, Kansas
- Coordinates: 38°10′59″N 99°13′05″W
- Area: 718 acres (291 ha)
- Built: 1860
- Architect: Quartermaster Dept., U.S. Army
- Visitation: 21,895 (2020)
- Website: Fort Larned National Historic Site
- NRHP reference No.: 66000107

Significant dates
- Added to NRHP: October 15, 1966
- Designated NHS: August 31, 1964

Fort Larned National Historic Site preserves Fort Larned which operated from 1859 to 1878. It is approximately 5.5 miles (8.9 km) west of Larned, Kansas, United States.

== History ==
The Camp on Pawnee Fork was established on October 22, 1859, to protect traffic along the Santa Fe Trail from hostile Native Americans. It was renamed Camp Alert in 1860, as the small garrison of about 50 men had to remain constantly alert for Indians. In May 1860 it was moved upstream, 3 miles (4.8 km) 30 miles to the west up the Pawnee Fork, and by the end of the month was renamed Fort Larned. It served the same purpose as Camp Alert and as an agency for the administration of the Central Plains Indians by the Bureau of Indian Affairs under the terms of the Fort Wise Treaty of 1861. The fort's service ended as a combination of the tribes' relocation to reservations and the completion of railroads across Kansas that ended the need for the Santa Fe Trail.

Larned, Kansas and the fort that was constructed there are named in honor of Colonel Benjamin F. Larned, the paymaster general of the United States Army at the time the post was established. Larned experienced a lengthy military career, first serving as an ensign in the 21st Infantry during the War of 1812. He was promoted to captain after the defense of Fort Erie, and by 1854 Larned was a colonel and had been appointed paymaster general. Despite the town and fort bearing his name, Colonel Larned never came to Kansas.

As the American government claimed vast amounts of land west of the Mississippi River, trade and commerce with the territories grew exponentially. According to one source in 1859, trade had risen $10,000,000 annually. In the Missouri Republican, it was reported that 2,300 men, 1970 wagons, 840 horses, 4,000 mules, 15,000 oxen, 73 carriages, and over 1,900 tons of freight left Missouri for New Mexico. It became apparent an additional fortification was required to protect the trade routes. Fort Larned's location was chosen by William Bent, an agent for the Upper Arkansas Indians. Bent stated, "I consider it essential to have two permanent stations for troops, one at the mouth of Pawnee Fork, and one at Big Timbers, both upon the Arkansas River....To control them (the Indians), it is essential to have among them the perpetual presence of a controlling military force."

The fort's original structures were poorly constructed and inadequate. Built of adobe bricks, Fort Larned consisted of an officer's quarters, two combination storehouses and barracks, a guardhouse, two laundresses' quarters, and a hospital, with a bakery and meat house being later additions. After its establishment, nearby Plains Indians began to respect the trail commerce. In August, 1861, Colonel Leavenworth, reporting from Fort Larned, stated the Indians had left the Santa Fe trail area and there was no apprehension of any hostilities.

When the Civil War erupted in 1861, Fort Larned witnessed its first action and hostility from the Indians. Soldiers in the regular army were removed from the post to join the growing conflict in the East, leaving the fort to be operated by volunteer troops from Kansas, Colorado, and Wisconsin. Raids and harassment of travelers by Plains Indians increased during the Civil War years. On July 17, 1864, Kiowa Indians raided Fort Larned and stole 172 horses and mules from the corral. The raiders were pursued but never caught. In 1865 a system of escorting wagon trains was established, and all merchants were forbidden travel westward beyond Fort Larned without an armed escort.

Though the fort was never directly involved in any Civil War engagements, one incident nearly brought the fighting to Larned. In May 1862, Confederate General Albert Pike arranged an alliance with some Kiowa and Seminole Indians with intentions of capturing Forts Larned and Wise. The plan was never carried out, as the Indians left for their annual hunt when the weather improved.

Fort Larned was the site of a meeting between General Winfield Scott Hancock and several Cheyenne chiefs on April 12, 1867, in which Hancock intended to impress the Dog Soldier chiefs with his military power. After the meeting, Hancock, along with George Armstrong Custer and the 7th U.S. Cavalry traveled west of Fort Larned to a combined Cheyenne and Lakota camp, inciting the villagers to flee. Hancock ordered the village burned, beginning a summer of warfare known as Hancock's War. Fort Larned assisted in bringing Hancock's War to an end by supplying the Medicine Lodge Treaty. During the winter of 1868–69, U.S. Major General Philip H. Sheridan launched a campaign against the Cheyenne, Kiowa, and Comanche Indians in the Great Plains region. Sheridan's men attacked any who resisted, taking their supplies and livestock and pushing the remaining Indians back into their reservations. By the end of the Winter Campaign, Sheridan had forced a majority of the Indians in the Fort Larned area on to reservations.

Renovations to Fort Larned took place between 1866 and 1868. The original sod and adobe structures were removed and replaced with the sandstone buildings that make up the fort today. By 1871, no escorts were required for the wagon trains traveling on the Santa Fe Trail, eliminating the need for military presence in the region. The post was abandoned on July 13, 1878, and on March 26, 1883, the Fort Larned Military Reservation was transferred from the War Department to the General Land Office of the Department of the Interior.

From 1885 to 1966, the buildings housed the headquarters of a ranch, with the owners living in the house of the commanding officer and the employees residing in what had been the officers' quarters. In 1957 the Fort Larned Historical Society was founded to develop and open the site as a tourist attraction. The fort was designated as a National Landmark in 1961, and in 1964 it was incorporated as a unit of the National Park System.

== Historic Site ==
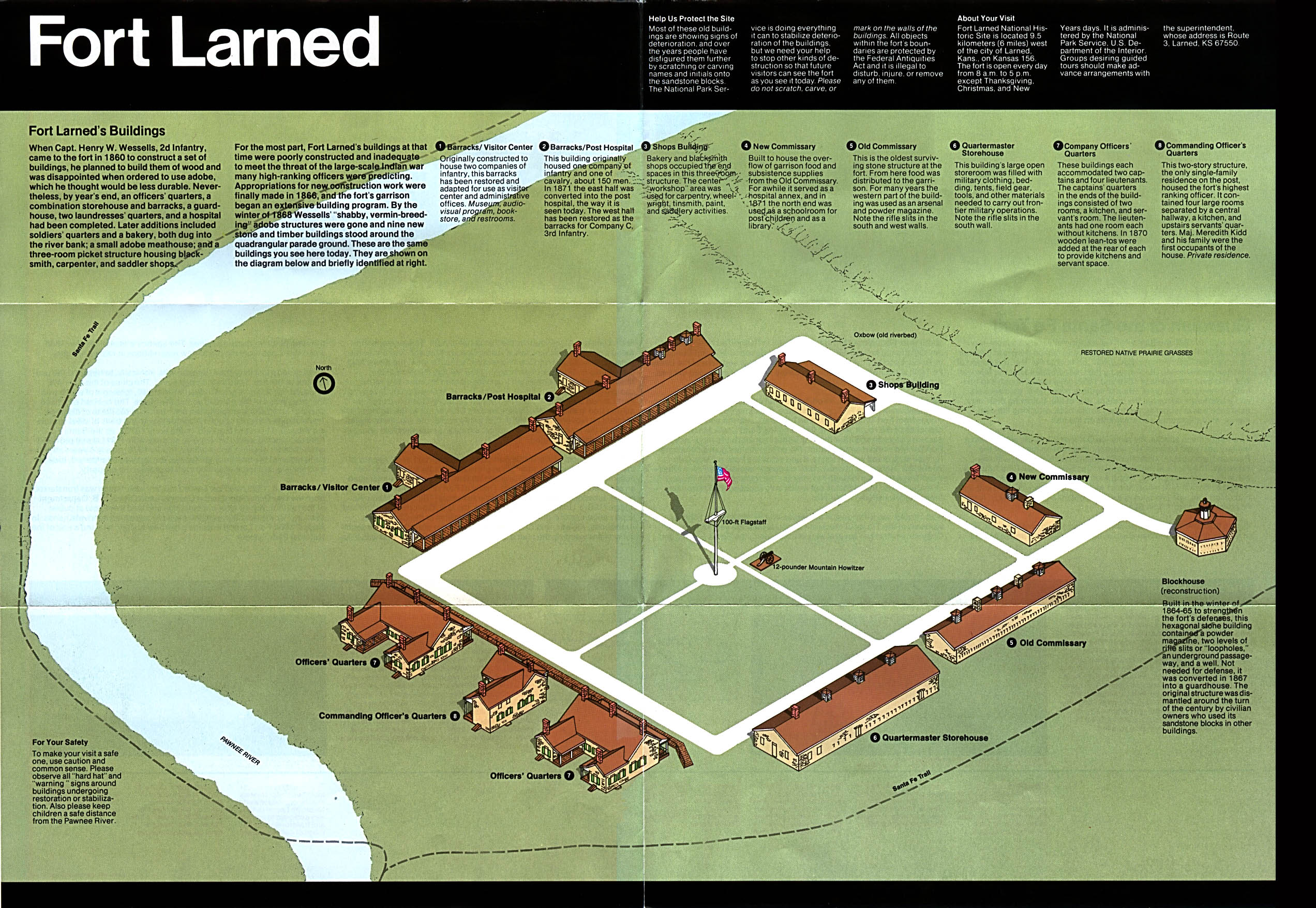
Schematic of Fort Larned National Historic site

Barracks – Barracks housed the infantry and cavalry on the north side of the Fort. The barracks housed up to four companies. On average, just 100 or 150 troops were stationed here. By 1868, a peak of 400 and 500.

Shops – Repairs were handled by skilled, civilian tradesmen. Blacksmiths and carpenters were hired at high wages. In 1867, a blacksmiths made $85 a month, saddlers and wheelwrights $90. Soldiers who had skills could take on extra duty working in the shops building as laborers, blacksmiths, and mechanics. The bakery was at the north end of the shops and baked bread. The bread was allowed to "dry" on racks for at least two days before being served.

Warehouses – An important role for a frontier fort was as a place to store the supplies that kept the Army functioning, including food, ammunition, and clothing. The first sandstone buildings completed after the blockhouse. The first two, the Old Commissary and the Quartermaster Storehouse, brandish loopholes from which the fort could be defended with rifle fire in the event of an attack.

Officers' Row – The company officers' quarters were designed to house four companies' of officers. A typical company's officers included two lieutenants and one captain. The officer' were divided into two halls, each with four rooms; a lieutenant was housed in one room while captains could claim two. In the rear of each half of the building was a kitchen and servant's quarters.

Blockhouse – The first sandstone structure to be completed was the blockhouse. It provided for defense. Built with two floor, each with loopholes to defend from attackers. It included an underground well. As the threat of attack diminished, the blockhouse was converted into the post's prison. The well tunnel was partially filled and used for solitary confinement. The rifle loopholes were also filled. The blockhouse is the only sandstone building that has been completely rebuilt, though it has been located on its original foundation.

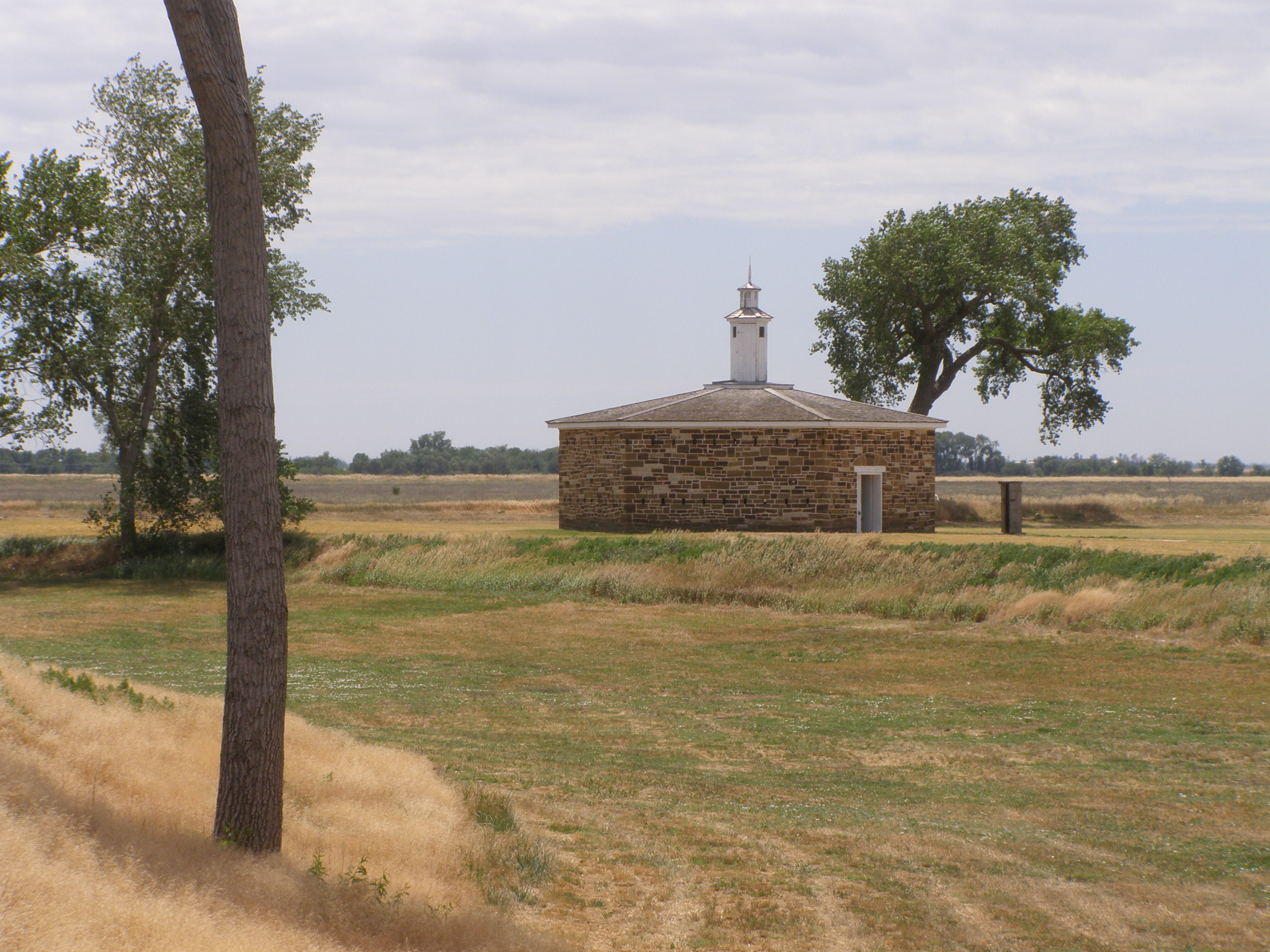
Blockhouse/Magazine/Prison

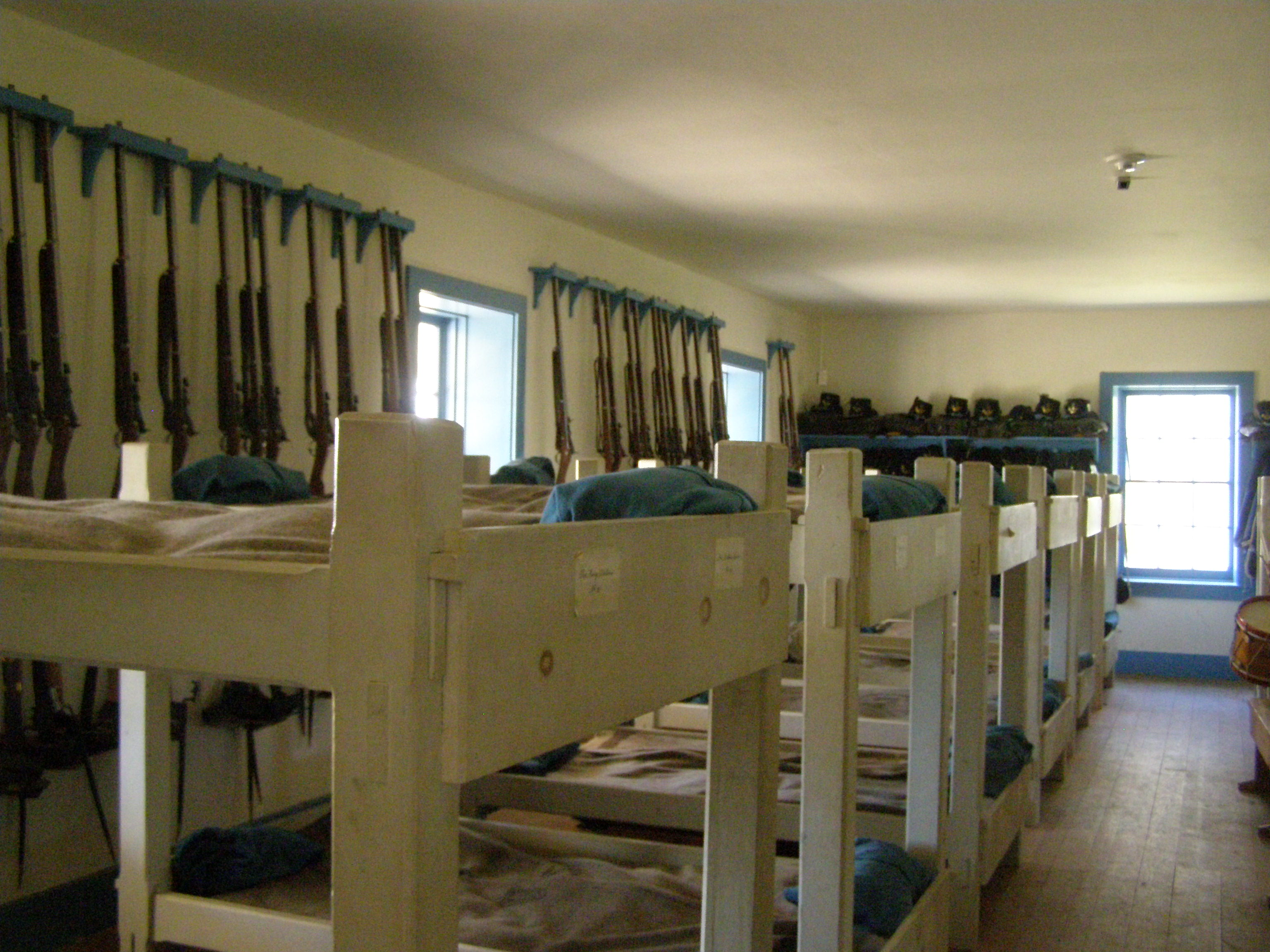
Bunk Room in the Barracks

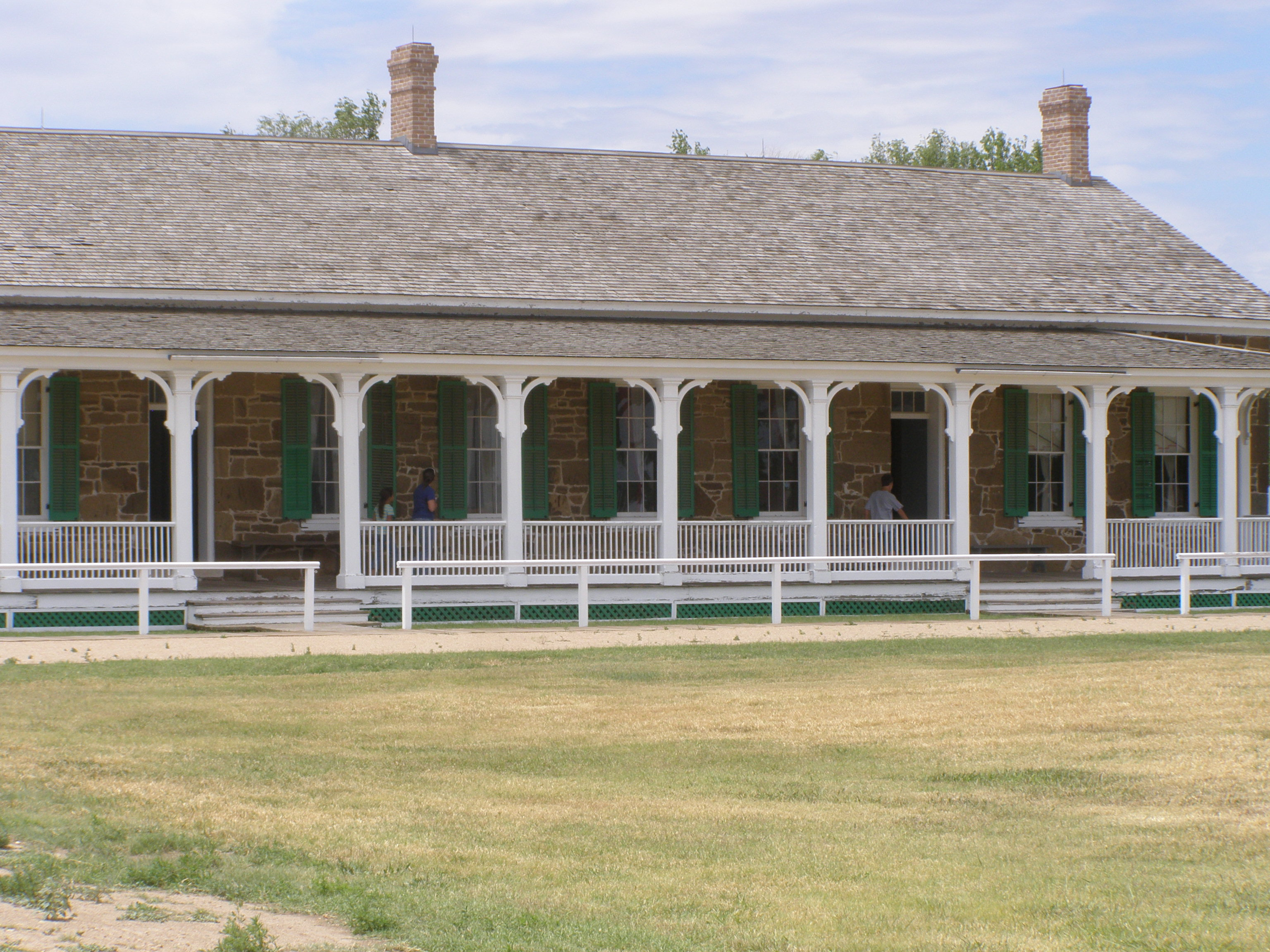
Junior Officer housing

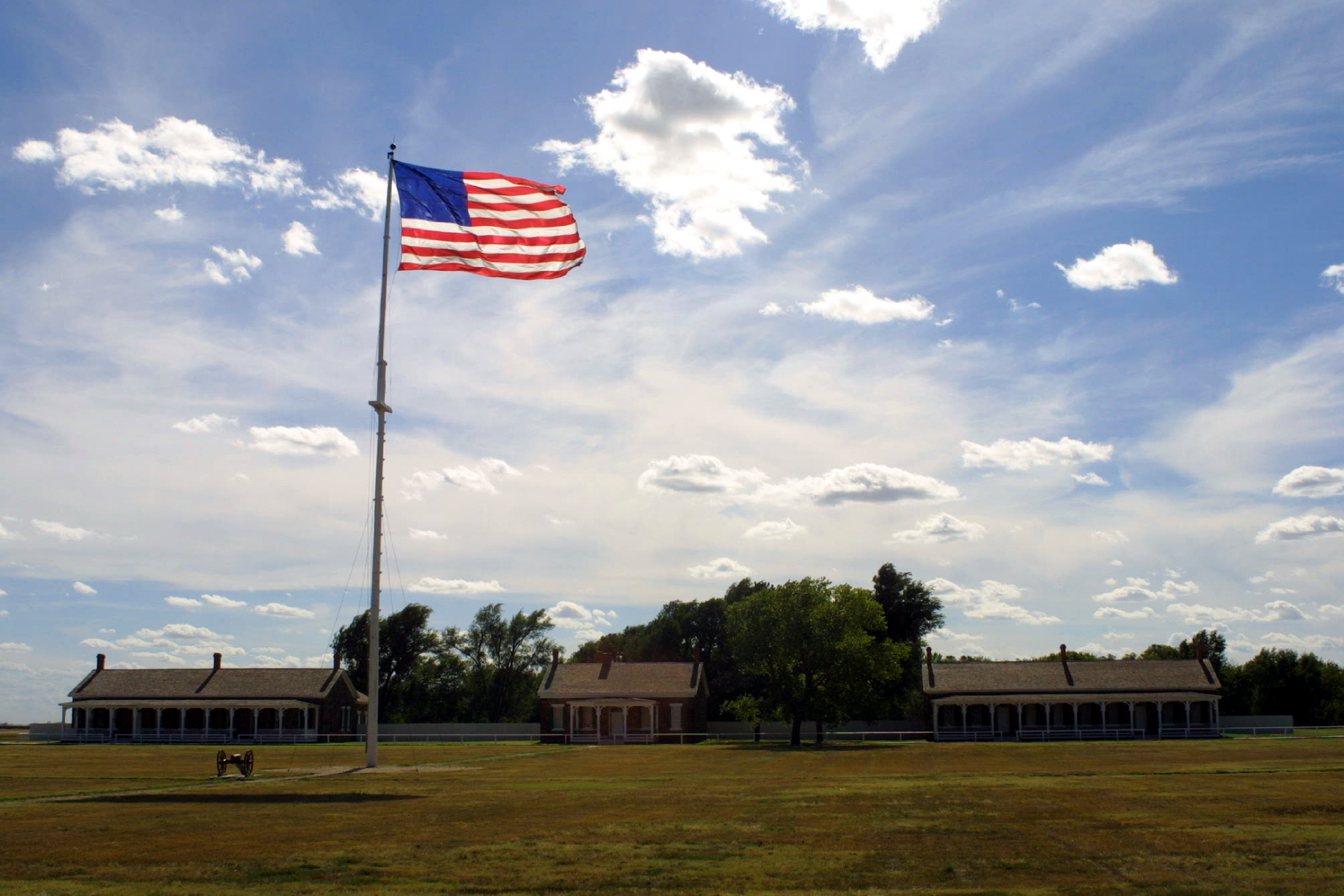
Parade Grounds

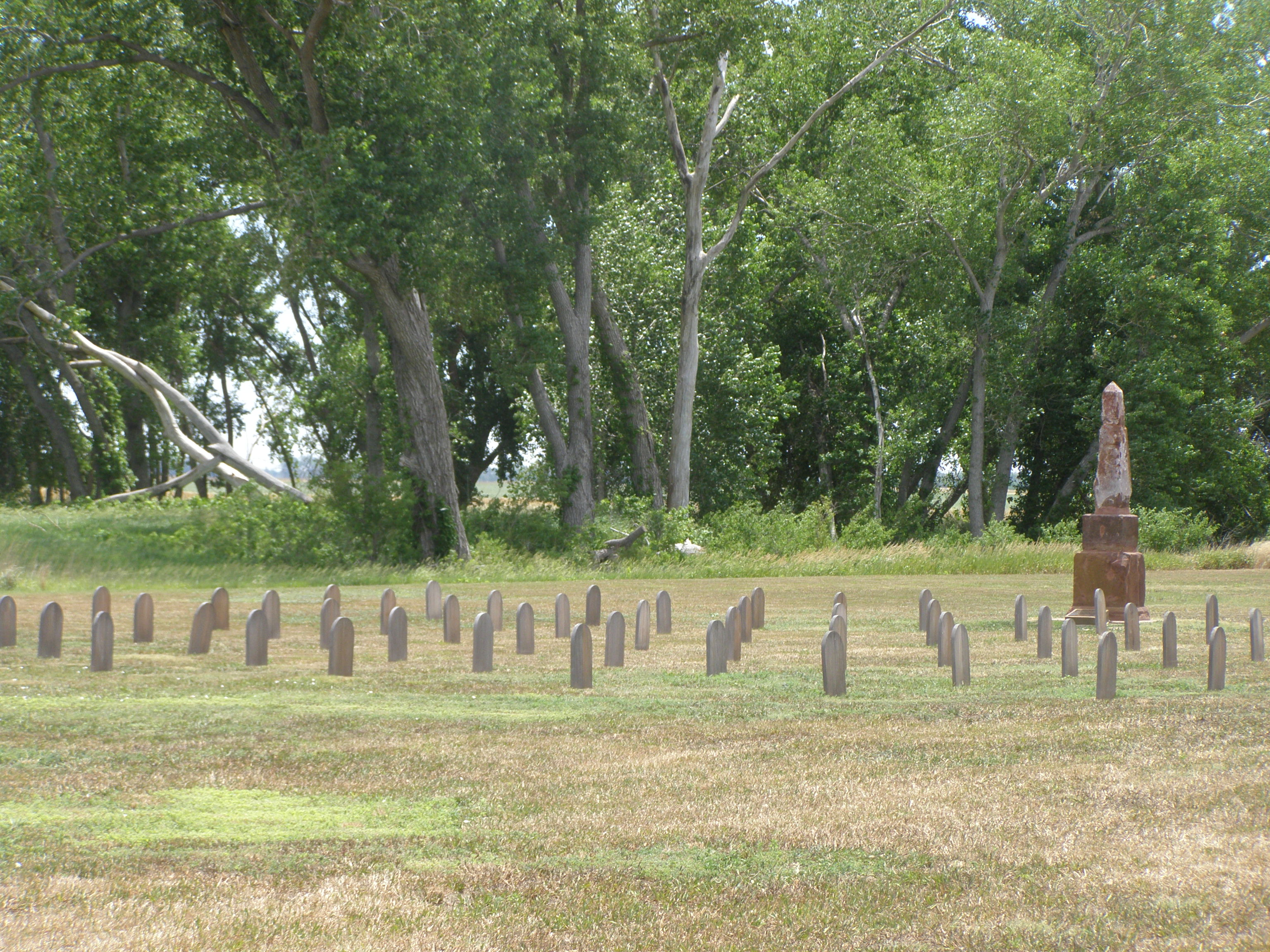
Fort Larned Cemetery

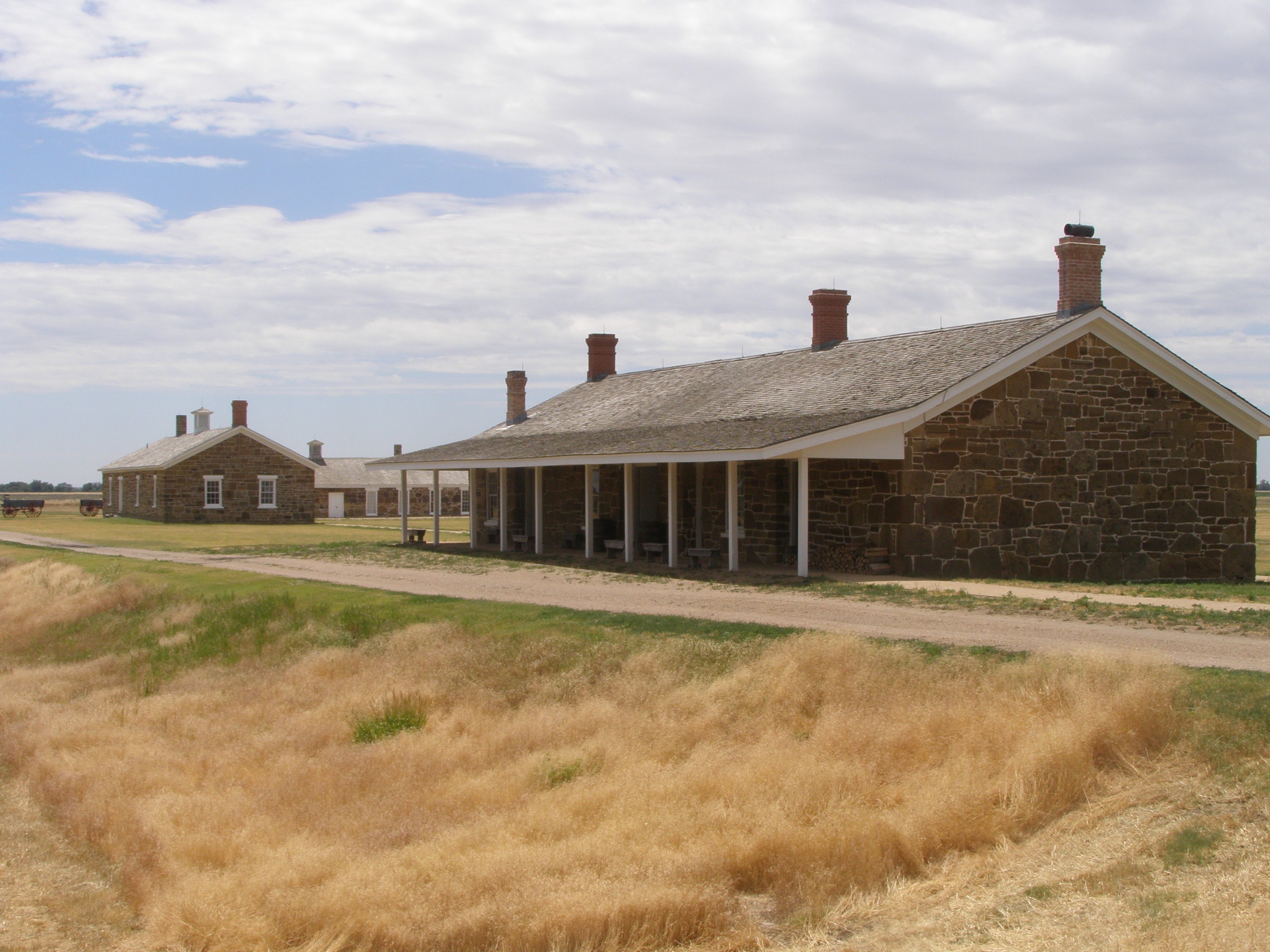
Warehouse

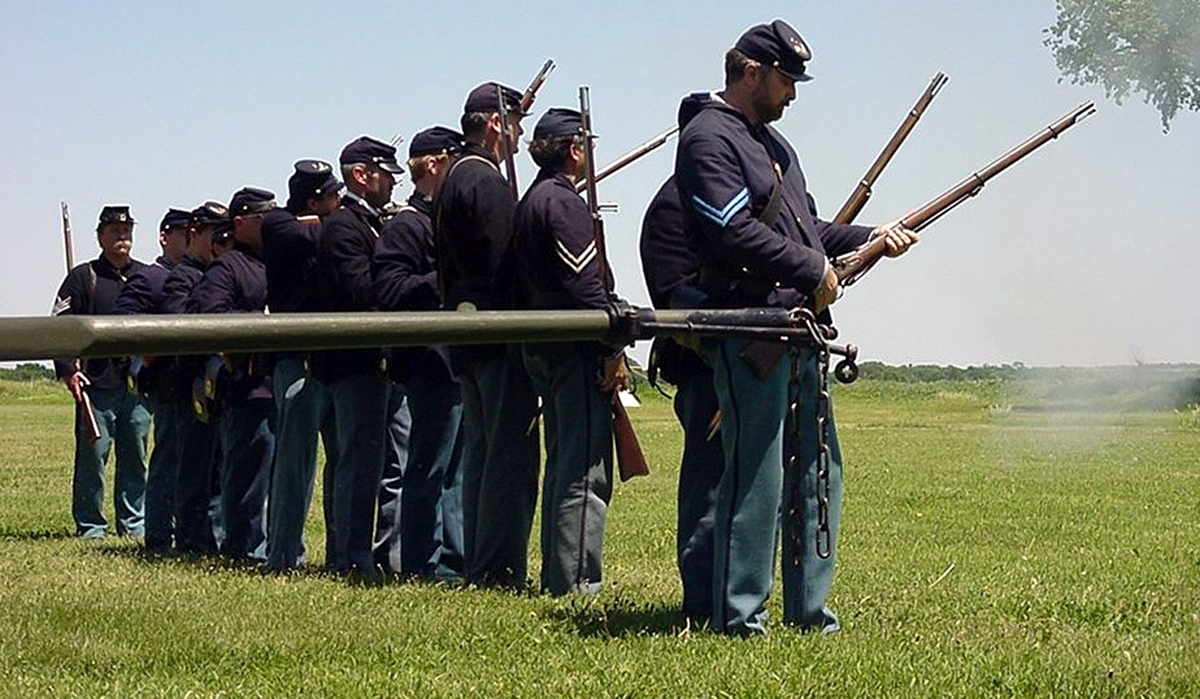
Living History program

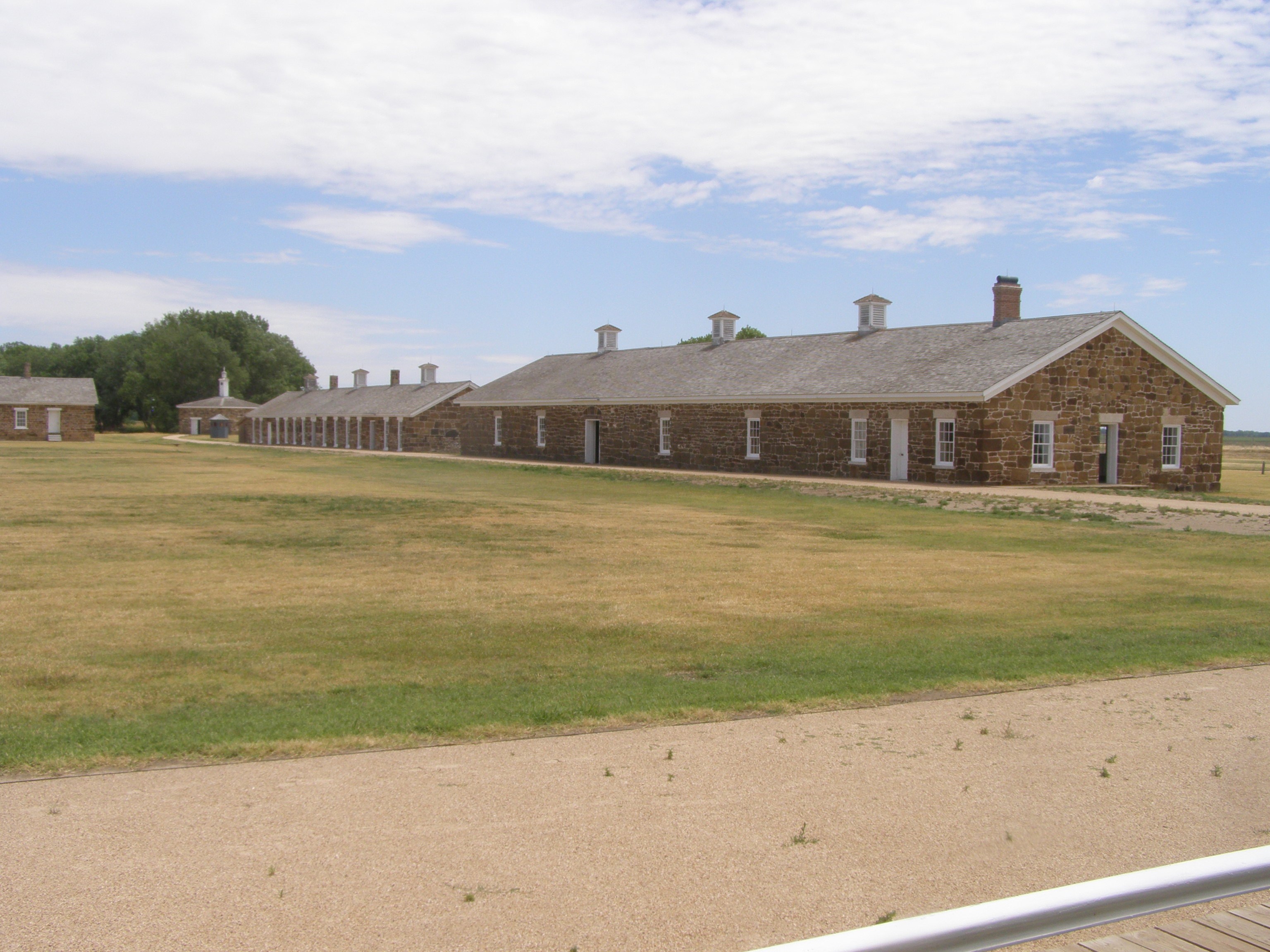
Commissary

With nine historic buildings, the fort survives as one of the best-preserved examples of Indian Wars-period forts. Most of the buildings, including the barracks, commissary, and officers quarters, are furnished to their original appearance. Fort Larned National Historic Site is open daily, year-round, and admission is free. The park offers several special events throughout the year, living history demonstrations, and ranger-guided tours.

== Units stationed at Fort Larned ==
The following units were stationed at Fort Larned during its 19 years of operation:

- 1st U.S. Cavalry – 1859
- 2nd U.S. Infantry – 1859–63
- 2nd U.S. Dragoons – 1860–61
- 2nd Regiment Kansas Volunteer Cavalry – 1862
- 9th Regiment Kansas Volunteer Cavalry – 1862–64
- 2nd Colorado Volunteer Cavalry – 1862–65
- 9th Battery, Wisconsin Light Artillery – 1862–65
- 1st Colorado Volunteer Cavalry – 1862–64
- 12th Regiment Kansas Volunteer Infantry – 1863
- McLain's Independent Colorado Volunteer Battery – 1864
- 15th Regiment Kansas Volunteer Cavalry – 1864–65
- 3rd Wisconsin Volunteer Cavalry – 1864
- 11th Regiment Kansas Volunteer Cavalry – 1864–65
- 2nd U.S. Volunteer Infantry – 1865
- 48th Wisconsin Volunteer Infantry Regiment – 1865
- 17th Regiment Illinois Volunteer Cavalry – 1865
- 2nd U.S. Cavalry – 1865–66
- 13th U.S. Infantry – 1865
- 3rd U.S. Infantry – 1866–72
- 37th U.S. Infantry – 1867
- 10th U.S. Cavalry – 1867–69
- 6th U.S. Infantry – 1871–72
- 5th U.S. Infantry – 1872–74
- 19th U.S. Infantry – 1874–78

The 10th US Cavalry, stationed at Fort Larned from 1867 to 1869, was one of the first two all-black cavalry units utilized in the country, along with the 9th US Cavalry. On January 2, 1869, the 10th Cavalry's stables at Fort Larned burned to the ground. The fire killed dozens of horses, destroyed equipment, and caused the unit to be reassigned to Fort Zarah. In 1999, magnetic gradiometry and electromagnetic conductivity surveys were conducted at the fort to attempt to determine the location of the stables, which had been lost. The surveys identified several areas of anomalies consistent with locations of buildings, as well as evidence of disturbances to the land that occurred after the buildings were no longer used as a fort.
