= Belpre, Kansas =

City in Edwards County, Kansas, United States

- City
- Location within County and Kansas

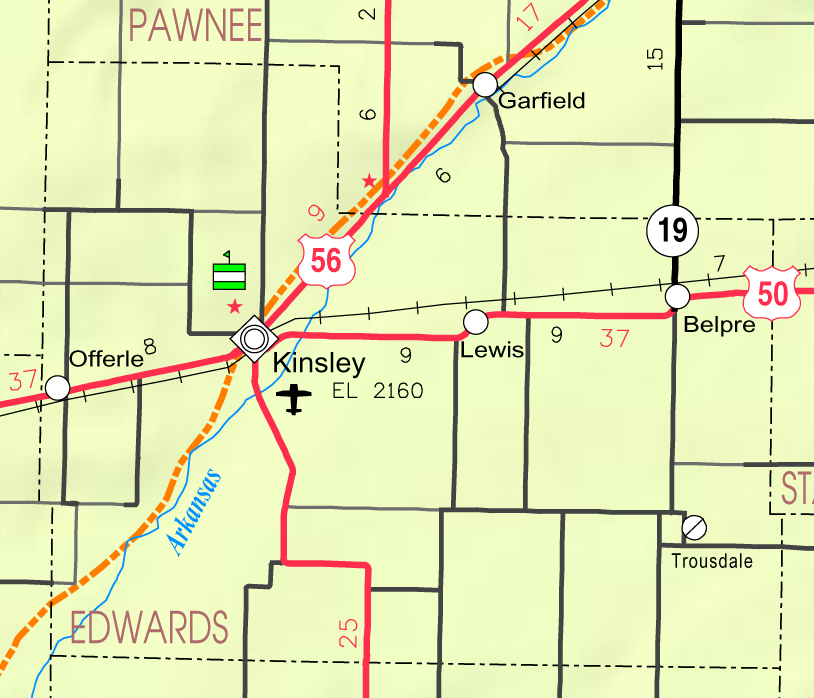
- KDOT map of Edwards County (legend)
- Coordinates: 37°57′02″N 99°05′59″W
- Country: United States
- State: Kansas
- County: Edwards
- Founded: 1879
- Incorporated: 1906

Area
  - Total: 0.41 sq mi (1.06 km^{2})
  - Land: 0.41 sq mi (1.06 km^{2})
  - Water: 0 sq mi (0.00 km^{2})
- Elevation: 2,090 ft (640 m)

Population (2020)
  - Total: 97
  - Density: 240/sq mi (92/km^{2})
- Time zone: UTC-6 (CST)
  - Summer (DST): UTC-5 (CDT)
- ZIP Code: 67519
- Area code: 620
- FIPS code: 20-05825
- GNIS ID: 2394124

Belpre is a city in Edwards County, Kansas, United States. As of the 2020 census, the population of the city was 97. It is located along Highway 50.

== History ==
Belpre was founded in 1879 and was incorporated in 1906. Belpre is derived from the French word "belle prairie" for "beautiful meadow".

The first post office in Belpre was established in 1879.

== Geography ==
Belpre is located at 37°57′4″N 99°5′59″W (37.950976, -99.099597). According to the United States Census Bureau, the city has a total area of 0.41 square miles (1.06 km^{2}), all land.

=== Climate ===
The climate in this area is characterized by hot, humid summers and generally mild to cool winters. According to the Köppen Climate Classification system, Belpre has a humid subtropical climate, abbreviated "Cfa" on climate maps.

== Demographics ==
Historical population
Census	Pop.	Note	%±
1910	485		—
1920	488		0.6%
1930	382		−21.7%
1940	300		−21.5%
1950	231		−23.0%
1960	211		−8.7%
1970	191		−9.5%
1980	154		−19.4%
1990	116		−24.7%
2000	104		−10.3%
2010	84		−19.2%
2020	97		15.5%
U.S. Decennial Census

=== 2020 census ===
The 2020 United States census counted 97 people, 40 households, and 28 families in Belpre. The population density was 236.0 per square mile (91.1/km^{2}). There were 54 housing units at an average density of 131.4 per square mile (50.7/km^{2}). The racial makeup was 62.89% (61) white or European American (28.87% non-Hispanic white), 0.0% (0) black or African-American, 1.03% (1) Native American or Alaska Native, 0.0% (0) Asian, 0.0% (0) Pacific Islander or Native Hawaiian, 21.65% (21) from other races, and 14.43% (14) from two or more races. Hispanic or Latino of any race was 69.07% (67) of the population.

Of the 40 households, 42.5% had children under the age of 18; 50.0% were married couples living together; 25.0% had a female householder with no spouse or partner present. 27.5% of households consisted of individuals and 20.0% had someone living alone who was 65 years of age or older. The average household size was 2.1 and the average family size was 2.5. The percent of those with a bachelor's degree or higher was estimated to be 0.0% of the population.

32.0% of the population was under the age of 18, 15.5% from 18 to 24, 12.4% from 25 to 44, 26.8% from 45 to 64, and 13.4% who were 65 years of age or older. The median age was 26.8 years. For every 100 females, there were 90.2 males. For every 100 females ages 18 and older, there were 106.2 males.

The 2016–2020 5-year American Community Survey estimates show that the median household income was $27,083 (with a margin of error of +/- $13,927) and the median family income was $31,250 (+/- $17,028). Males had a median income of $22,250 (+/- $6,955) versus $18,750 (+/- $14,141) for females. The median income for those above 16 years old was $21,406 (+/- $1,958). Approximately, 27.8% of families and 32.7% of the population were below the poverty line, including 46.2% of those under the age of 18 and 11.1% of those ages 65 or over.

=== 2010 census ===
As of the census of 2010, there were 84 people, 34 households, and 18 families residing in the city. The population density was 204.9 inhabitants per square mile (79.1/km^{2}). There were 63 housing units at an average density of 153.7 per square mile (59.3/km^{2}). The racial makeup of the city was 88.1% White, 1.2% Native American, and 10.7% from other races. Hispanic or Latino of any race were 45.2% of the population.

There were 34 households, of which 29.4% had children under the age of 18 living with them, 38.2% were married couples living together, 8.8% had a female householder with no husband present, 5.9% had a male householder with no wife present, and 47.1% were non-families. 38.2% of all households were made up of individuals, and 23.5% had someone living alone who was 65 years of age or older. The average household size was 2.47 and the average family size was 3.44.

The median age in the city was 39 years. 28.6% of residents were under the age of 18; 8.3% were between the ages of 18 and 24; 19.1% were from 25 to 44; 29.8% were from 45 to 64; and 14.3% were 65 years of age or older. The gender makeup of the city was 48.8% male and 51.2% female.

== Education ==
The community is served by Macksville USD 351 public school district.

== Transportation ==
The Atchison, Topeka and Santa Fe Railway previously provided passenger and freight rail service to Belpre. A depot was built in 1910, and relocated to Great Bend in 1968 for use as a museum.
