= Belpre Township, Kansas =

Belpre Township
- Township
- Location in Edwards County
- Coordinates: 37°57′23″N 099°06′16″W
- Country: United States
- State: Kansas
- County: Edwards

Area
  - Total: 54.2 sq mi (140.3 km^{2})
  - Land: 54.17 sq mi (140.29 km^{2})
  - Water: 0.0039 sq mi (0.01 km^{2}) 0.01%
- Elevation: 2,090 ft (637 m)

Population (2020)
  - Total: 182
  - Density: 3.36/sq mi (1.30/km^{2})
- GNIS feature ID: 0473553

Belpre Township is a township in Edwards County, Kansas, United States. As of the 2020 census, its population was 182.

== Geography ==
Belpre Township covers an area of 54.17 square miles (140.3 km^{2}) and contains one incorporated settlement, Belpre.
