= Pawnee County, Kansas =

County in Kansas, United States

- County
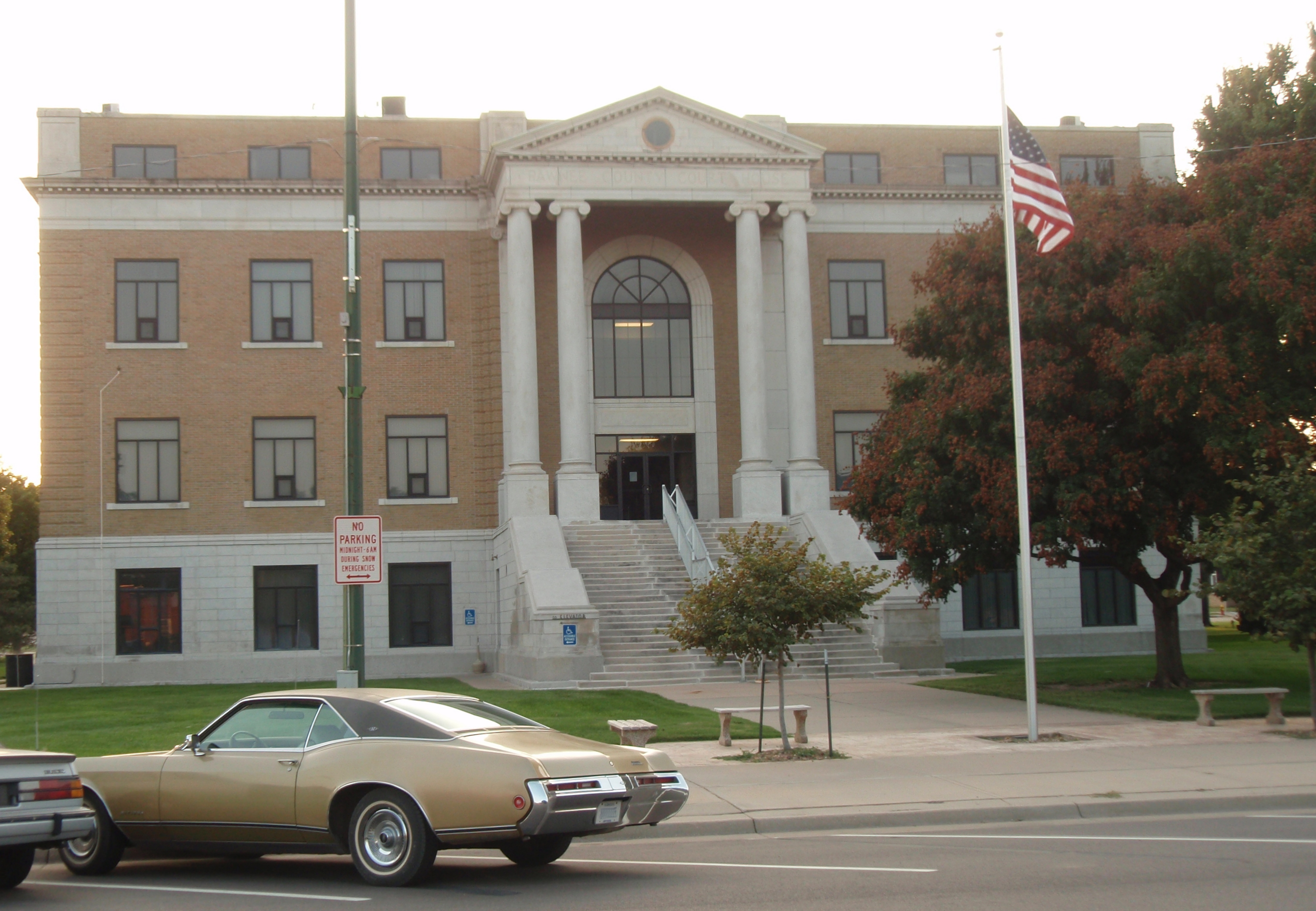
- Pawnee County Courthouse in Larned (2009)

- Location within the U.S. state of Kansas
- Coordinates: 38°09′N 99°12′W
- Country: United States
- State: Kansas
- Founded: February 26, 1867
- Named for: Pawnee tribe
- Seat: Larned
- Largest city: Larned

Area
  - Total: 755 sq mi (1,960 km^{2})
  - Land: 754 sq mi (1,950 km^{2})
  - Water: 0.4 sq mi (1.0 km^{2}) 0.05%

Population (2020)
  - Total: 6,253
  - Estimate (2025): 5,991 ▼
  - Density: 8.3/sq mi (3.2/km^{2})
- Time zone: UTC−6 (Central)
  - Summer (DST): UTC−5 (CDT)
- Congressional districts: 1st, 4th
- Website: pawneecountykansas.com

Pawnee County is a county located in the U.S. state of Kansas. Its county seat and largest city is Larned. As of the 2020 census, the county population was 6,253. The county is named after the Pawnee tribe.

Agriculture remains a cornerstone of Pawnee County's economy, with the county being one of the state's leading producers of winter wheat. Other agricultural products include oilseed, grain, vegetables, melons, and cotton. The county also supports beef cattle ranching and feedlots.

== History ==
Pawnee County was established in 1867 and organized in 1872. The county derives its name from the Pawnee Indian tribe, who historically inhabited the region. Prior to its establishment as Pawnee County, the area was contained in the old Washington County, Peketon County, and later Marion County.

Ford Larned was established near the site of present-day Larned, Kansas between 1859 and 1860 to provide protection for wagon trains traversing the Santa Fe Trail. Notably, in January 1863, a wagon train was stopped by a starving band Cheyenne and Arapaho Indians. After refusing the Indians' request for supplies, the wagon train was attacked and all but one of the teamsters killed. The survivor sought refuge at Ford Larned.

Against this background of increasing tension in the region, Fort Larned became a base of operations for Major General Winfield Hancock's campaign against the Plains tribes. After Hancock requested reinforcements from U.S. Seventh Cavalry, led by Lieutenant Colonel George A. Custer, Custer began a campaign against the Cheyenne culminating in their defeat in the Battle of the Washita River in Oklahoma.

Additionally, Fort Larned played a vital role in safeguarding railroad construction workers, distributing treaty-established annuities to the Indians, and serving as a Bureau of Indian Affairs office during the 1860s. While the fort officially closed in 1878, a detachment from Fort Dodge remained stationed there until 1883.

== Geography ==
According to the U.S. Census Bureau, the county has a total area of 755 square miles (1,960 km^{2}), of which 754 square miles (1,950 km^{2}) is land and 0.4 square miles (1.0 km^{2}) (0.05%) is water.

=== Adjacent counties ===
- Rush County (north)
- Barton County (northeast)
- Stafford County (east)
- Edwards County (south)
- Hodgeman County (west)
- Ness County (northwest)

=== National protected area ===
- Fort Larned National Historic Site

== Demographics ==
Historical population
Census	Pop.	Note	%±
1870	179		—
1880	5,396		2,914.5%
1890	5,204		−3.6%
1900	5,084		−2.3%
1910	8,859		74.3%
1920	9,323		5.2%
1930	10,510		12.7%
1940	10,300		−2.0%
1950	11,041		7.2%
1960	10,254		−7.1%
1970	8,484		−17.3%
1980	8,065		−4.9%
1990	7,555		−6.3%
2000	7,233		−4.3%
2010	6,973		−3.6%
2020	6,253		−10.3%
2025 (est.)	5,991	▼	−4.2%
U.S. Decennial Census; 1790-1960 1900-1990; 1990-2000 2010-2020

=== Racial and ethnic composition ===
Pawnee County, Kansas – Racial and ethnic composition Note: the US Census treats Hispanic/Latino as an ethnic category. This table excludes Latinos from the racial categories and assigns them to a separate category. Hispanics/Latinos may be of any race.
Race / Ethnicity (NH = Non-Hispanic)	Pop 1980	Pop 1990	Pop 2000	Pop 2010	Pop 2020	% 1980	% 1990	% 2000	% 2010	% 2020
White alone (NH)	7,542	6,976	6,423	6,018	5,154	93.52%	92.34%	88.80%	86.30%	82.42%
Black or African American alone (NH)	189	233	354	318	246	2.34%	3.08%	4.89%	4.56%	3.93%
Native American or Alaska Native alone (NH)	34	26	52	36	24	0.42%	0.34%	0.72%	0.52%	0.38%
Asian alone (NH)	75	56	39	32	28	0.93%	0.74%	0.54%	0.46%	0.45%
Native Hawaiian or Pacific Islander alone (NH)	x	x	0	2	0	x	x	0.00%	0.03%	0.00%
Other race alone (NH)	14	8	3	3	27	0.17%	0.11%	0.04%	0.04%	0.43%
Mixed race or Multiracial (NH)	x	x	61	103	252	x	x	0.84%	1.48%	4.03%
Hispanic or Latino (any race)	211	256	301	461	522	2.62%	3.39%	4.16%	6.61%	8.35%
Total	8,065	7,555	7,233	6,973	6,253	100.00%	100.00%	100.00%	100.00%	100.00%

=== 2020 census ===
As of the 2020 census, the county had a population of 6,253. The median age was 42.3 years. 20.5% of residents were under the age of 18 and 20.9% of residents were 65 years of age or older. For every 100 females there were 121.5 males, and for every 100 females age 18 and over there were 124.3 males age 18 and over.

The racial makeup of the county was 85.7% White, 4.0% Black or African American, 0.6% American Indian and Alaska Native, 0.4% Asian, 0.0% Native Hawaiian and Pacific Islander, 2.0% from some other race, and 7.1% from two or more races. Hispanic or Latino residents of any race comprised 8.3% of the population.

59.7% of residents lived in urban areas, while 40.3% lived in rural areas.

There were 2,455 households in the county, of which 25.9% had children under the age of 18 living with them and 27.2% had a female householder with no spouse or partner present. About 34.7% of all households were made up of individuals and 17.3% had someone living alone who was 65 years of age or older.

There were 3,055 housing units, of which 19.6% were vacant. Among occupied housing units, 69.3% were owner-occupied and 30.7% were renter-occupied. The homeowner vacancy rate was 2.8% and the rental vacancy rate was 21.3%.

=== 2000 census ===
As of the census of 2000, there were 7,233 people, 2,739 households, and 1,785 families residing in the county. The population density was 10 people per square mile (3.9 people/km^{2}). There were 3,114 housing units at an average density of 4 per square mile (1.5/km^{2}). The racial makeup of the county was 90.96% White, 5.00% Black or African American, 0.95% Native American, 0.57% Asian, 1.22% from other races, and 1.30% from two or more races. 4.16% of the population were Hispanic or Latino of any race.

There were 2,739 households, out of which 29.20% had children under the age of 18 living with them, 54.80% were married couples living together, 7.30% had a female householder with no husband present, and 34.80% were non-families. 32.20% of all households were made up of individuals, and 15.60% had someone living alone who was 65 years of age or older. The average household size was 2.31 and the average family size was 2.91.

In the county, the population was spread out, with 24.20% under the age of 18, 7.30% from 18 to 24, 25.40% from 25 to 44, 24.60% from 45 to 64, and 18.50% who were 65 years of age or older. The median age was 40 years. For every 100 females there were 112.00 males. For every 100 females age 18 and over, there were 112.70 males.

The median income for a household in the county was $35,175, and the median income for a family was $45,634. Males had a median income of $26,751 versus $20,931 for females. The per capita income for the county was $17,584. About 5.40% of families and 11.80% of the population were below the poverty line, including 9.00% of those under age 18 and 9.90% of those age 65 or over.

== Government ==
=== Presidential elections ===
Pawnee County has been primarily Republican for the majority of its history. However, there have been multiple stretches where it was considered a swing county, backing the national winner in all presidential elections from 1904 to 1936 as well as 1964 to 1988. It has trended away from bellwether status since 1988 however.

Presidential election results

United States presidential election results for Pawnee County, Kansas
Year	Republican		Democratic		Third party(ies)	
Year	No.	%	No.	%	No.	%
1888	895	61.94%	303	20.97%	247	17.09%
1892	670	47.86%	0	0.00%	730	52.14%
1896	499	43.28%	635	55.07%	19	1.65%
1900	684	48.00%	727	51.02%	14	0.98%
1904	957	60.80%	494	31.39%	123	7.81%
1908	1,000	48.43%	961	46.54%	104	5.04%
1912	366	16.25%	1,050	46.63%	836	37.12%
1916	1,499	38.72%	2,131	55.05%	241	6.23%
1920	2,128	63.98%	1,138	34.22%	60	1.80%
1924	2,407	62.54%	1,111	28.86%	331	8.60%
1928	2,829	75.18%	918	24.40%	16	0.43%
1932	1,889	42.52%	2,451	55.17%	103	2.32%
1936	1,753	38.31%	2,814	61.49%	9	0.20%
1940	2,329	50.77%	2,216	48.31%	42	0.92%
1944	2,057	54.05%	1,727	45.38%	22	0.58%
1948	2,221	52.44%	1,945	45.93%	69	1.63%
1952	3,431	71.12%	1,340	27.78%	53	1.10%
1956	2,788	63.73%	1,567	35.82%	20	0.46%
1960	2,618	58.32%	1,853	41.28%	18	0.40%
1964	1,468	36.03%	2,577	63.25%	29	0.71%
1968	2,037	54.19%	1,416	37.67%	306	8.14%
1972	2,370	65.83%	1,110	30.83%	120	3.33%
1976	1,692	45.11%	1,959	52.23%	100	2.67%
1980	2,170	58.79%	1,184	32.08%	337	9.13%
1984	2,570	68.90%	1,092	29.28%	68	1.82%
1988	1,825	54.11%	1,474	43.70%	74	2.19%
1992	1,357	37.85%	1,118	31.19%	1,110	30.96%
1996	1,927	61.10%	932	29.55%	295	9.35%
2000	1,850	62.93%	968	32.93%	122	4.15%
2004	2,172	72.69%	773	25.87%	43	1.44%
2008	1,946	67.59%	882	30.64%	51	1.77%
2012	1,836	70.40%	718	27.53%	54	2.07%
2016	1,904	71.55%	579	21.76%	178	6.69%
2020	2,045	74.66%	643	23.48%	51	1.86%
2024	2,003	74.88%	625	23.36%	47	1.76%

=== Laws ===
Following amendment to the Kansas Constitution in 1986, Pawnee County remained a prohibition, or "dry", county until 1992, when voters approved the sale of alcoholic liquor by the individual drink with a 30 percent food sales requirement.

== Education ==
=== Unified school districts ===
- Ft. Larned USD 495
- Pawnee Heights USD 496

== Communities ==
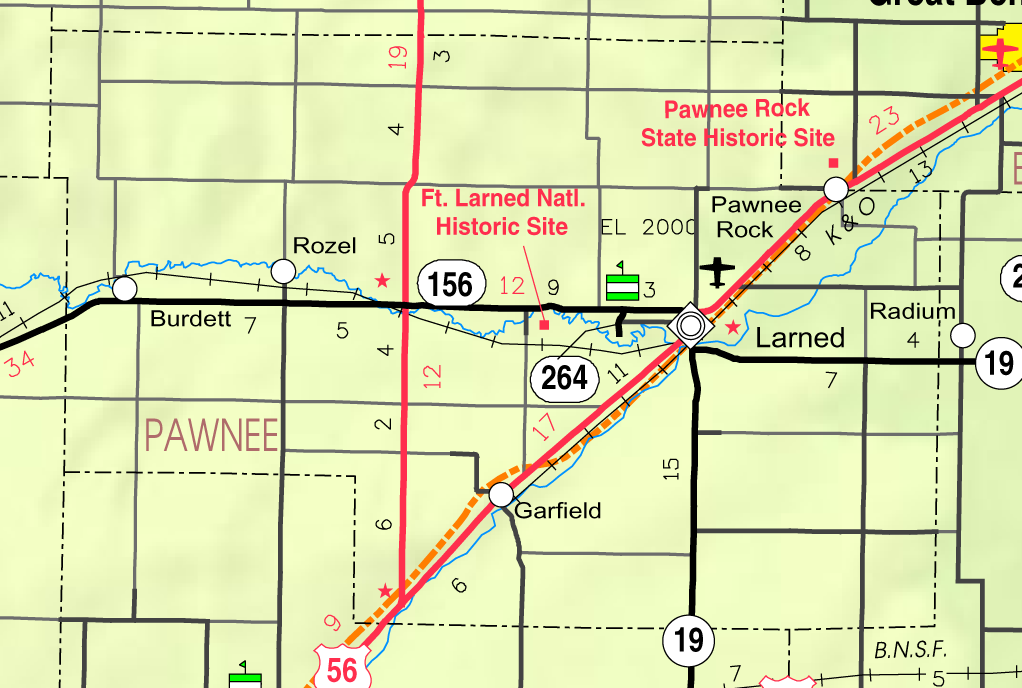
2005 map of Pawnee County (map legend)

List of townships / incorporated cities / unincorporated communities / extinct former communities within Pawnee County.

=== Cities ===
- Burdett
- Garfield
- Larned (county seat)
- Rozel

=== Unincorporated communities ===
- Ash Valley
- Frizell
- Sanford
- Zook

=== Townships ===
Pawnee County is divided into twenty-one townships. The city of Larned is considered governmentally independent and is excluded from the census figures for the townships. In the following table, the population center is the largest city (or cities) included in that township's population total, if it is of a significant size.

Sources: 2000 U.S. Gazetteer from the U.S. Census Bureau.
Township	FIPS	Population center	Population	Population density /km^{2} (/sq mi)	Land area km^{2} (sq mi)	Water area km^{2} (sq mi)	Water %	Geographic coordinates
Ash Valley	02825		49	1 (1)	95 (37)	0 (0)	0.07%	38°18′46″N 99°12′37″W
Browns Grove	08750		310	3 (9)	93 (36)	0 (0)	0%	38°12′1″N 99°31′12″W
Conkling	15225		26	0 (1)	94 (36)	0 (0)	0.07%	38°18′46″N 99°18′57″W
Garfield	25775		259	3 (7)	93 (36)	0 (0)	0.03%	38°2′55″N 99°16′50″W
Grant	27925		234	3 (7)	92 (36)	0 (0)	0.04%	38°11′54″N 99°24′18″W
Keysville	36625		55	1 (2)	94 (36)	0 (0)	0%	38°8′2″N 99°25′12″W
Larned	38725		266	3 (8)	87 (34)	0 (0)	0%	38°12′38″N 99°4′5″W
Lincoln	40975		28	0 (1)	93 (36)	0 (0)	0.12%	38°17′55″N 99°24′33″W
Logan	42075		48	1 (1)	93 (36)	0 (0)	0.07%	38°7′34″N 98°57′31″W
Morton	48525		56	1 (2)	92 (36)	0 (0)	0%	38°12′40″N 99°18′19″W
Orange	53000		73	1 (2)	92 (36)	0 (0)	0%	38°3′2″N 99°11′46″W
Pawnee	54800		82	1 (2)	93 (36)	0 (0)	0.06%	38°11′45″N 99°11′54″W
Pleasant Grove	56400		230	2 (6)	93 (36)	0 (0)	0.22%	38°9′20″N 99°5′13″W
Pleasant Ridge	56475		56	1 (2)	93 (36)	0 (0)	0.02%	38°7′25″N 99°18′6″W
Pleasant Valley	56600		128	1 (4)	93 (36)	0 (0)	0%	38°2′11″N 99°4′4″W
River	60050		87	1 (2)	92 (36)	0 (0)	0%	38°13′19″N 98°57′44″W
Santa Fe	63025		788	9 (22)	92 (36)	0 (0)	0%	38°9′0″N 99°10′37″W
Saw Mill	63250		24	0 (1)	93 (36)	0 (0)	0.07%	38°8′19″N 99°30′22″W
Shiley	65275		28	0 (1)	94 (36)	0 (0)	0.15%	38°18′12″N 99°32′20″W
Valley Center	73225		57	1 (2)	92 (35)	0 (0)	0.07%	38°3′4″N 98°57′47″W
Walnut	75050		113	1 (3)	93 (36)	0 (0)	0.08%	38°18′44″N 99°4′44″W

== See also ==
Community information for Kansas

- Kansas locations by per capita income
- List of counties in Kansas
- List of townships in Kansas
- List of cities in Kansas
- List of unincorporated communities in Kansas
- List of ghost towns in Kansas
