= Larned, Kansas =

City in Pawnee County, Kansas

- City and County seat
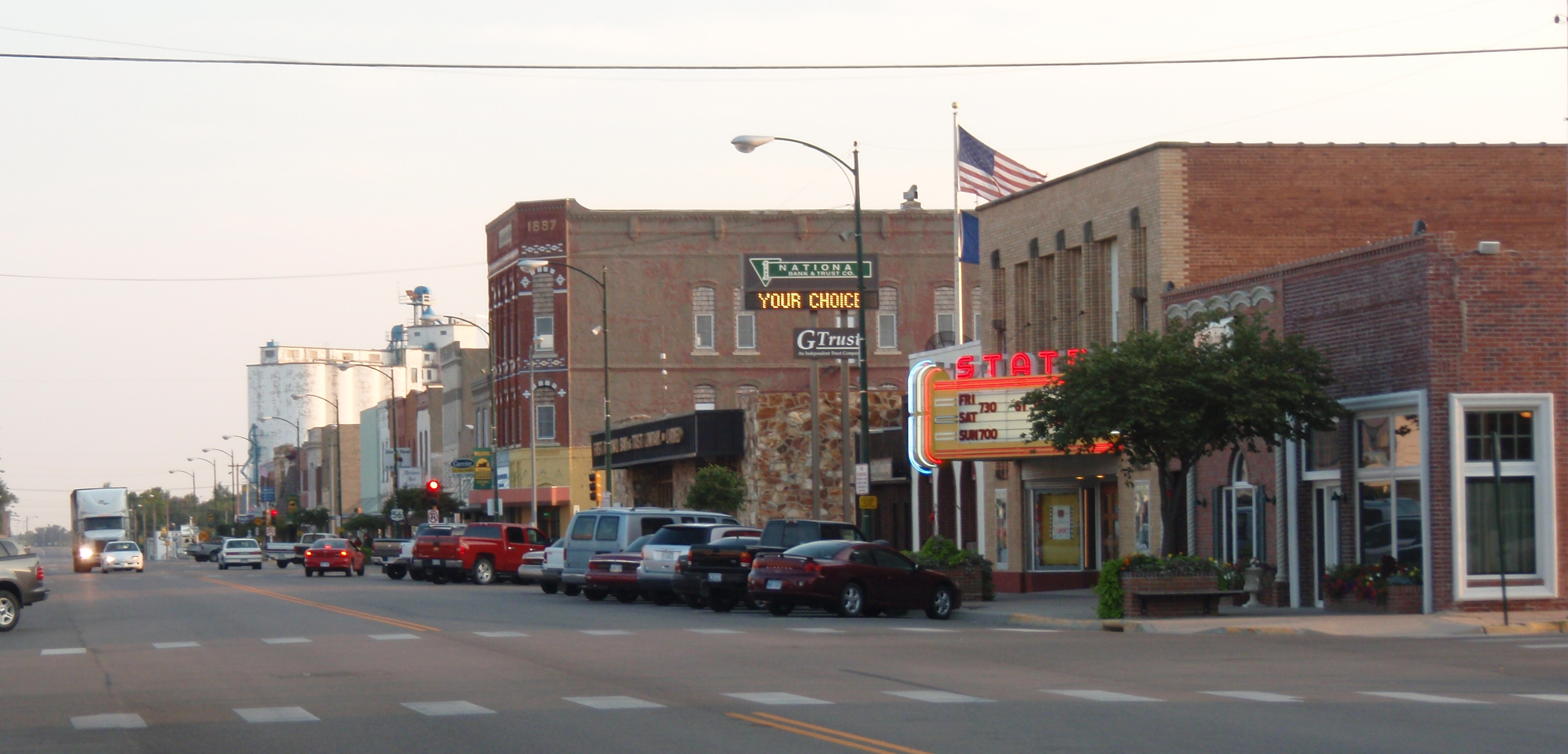
- Business District (2009)

- Location within Pawnee County and Kansas

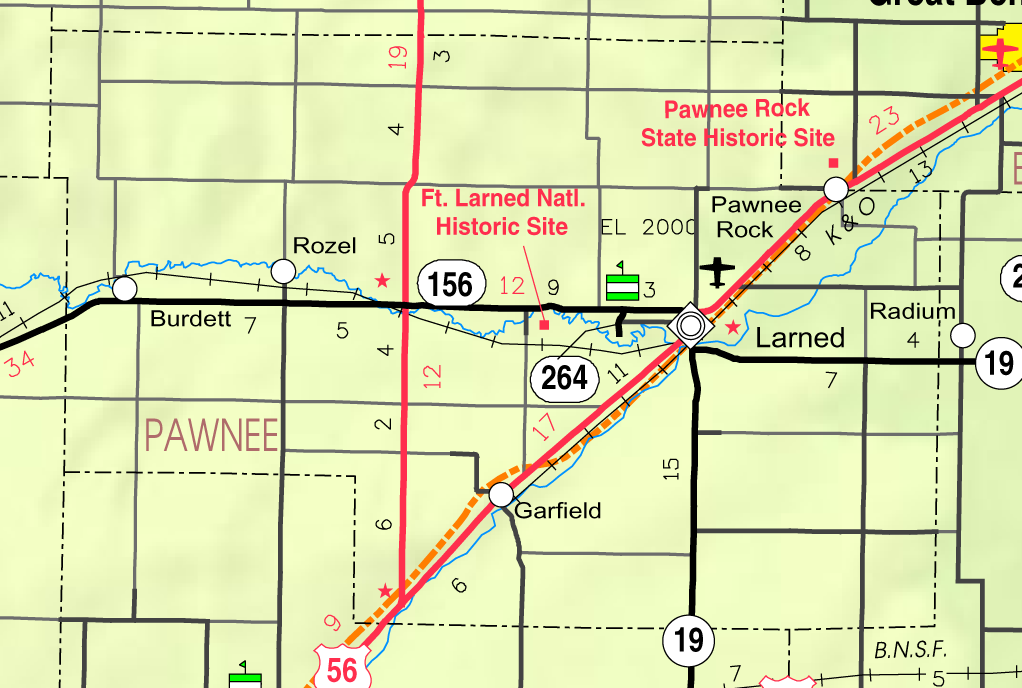
- KDOT map of Pawnee County (legend)
- Coordinates: 38°11′00″N 99°06′05″W
- Country: United States
- State: Kansas
- County: Pawnee
- Founded: 1870s
- Platted: 1873
- Incorporated: 1886
- Named for: Fort Larned

Area
  - Total: 2.41 sq mi (6.24 km^{2})
  - Land: 2.41 sq mi (6.24 km^{2})
  - Water: 0 sq mi (0.00 km^{2})
- Elevation: 2,034 ft (620 m)

Population (2020)
  - Total: 3,769
  - Density: 1,560/sq mi (604/km^{2})
- Time zone: UTC-6 (CST)
  - Summer (DST): UTC-5 (CDT)
- ZIP Code: 67550
- Area code: 620
- FIPS code: 20-38700
- GNIS ID: 485608
- Website: cityoflarned.org

Larned is a city in and the county seat of Pawnee County, Kansas, United States. As of the 2020 census, the population of the city was 3,769.

== History ==
Larned was laid out in 1873. The first post office was established at Larned in 1872.

The city drew its name from nearby Fort Larned, which operated from 1859 to 1878 and was named for Colonel Benjamin F. Larned, U.S. Army Paymaster from July 1854 to his death on September 6, 1862.

== Geography ==
According to the United States Census Bureau, the city has a total area of 2.39 square miles (6.19 km^{2}), all land.

=== Climate ===
The climate in this area is characterized by hot, humid summers and generally mild to cool winters. According to the Köppen Climate Classification system, Larned has a humid subtropical climate, abbreviated "Cfa" on climate maps.

Climate data for Larned, Kansas, 1991–2020 normals, extremes 1904–present
Month	Jan	Feb	Mar	Apr	May	Jun	Jul	Aug	Sep	Oct	Nov	Dec	Year
Record high °F (°C)	82 (28)	89 (32)	97 (36)	101 (38)	104 (40)	112 (44)	114 (46)	114 (46)	108 (42)	99 (37)	90 (32)	82 (28)	114 (46)
Mean maximum °F (°C)	68.8 (20.4)	74.4 (23.6)	82.3 (27.9)	89.9 (32.2)	95.0 (35.0)	100.3 (37.9)	104.2 (40.1)	102.4 (39.1)	99.2 (37.3)	91.2 (32.9)	78.1 (25.6)	66.9 (19.4)	105.4 (40.8)
Mean daily maximum °F (°C)	43.9 (6.6)	47.3 (8.5)	57.5 (14.2)	66.5 (19.2)	75.8 (24.3)	85.9 (29.9)	91.1 (32.8)	89.6 (32.0)	82.4 (28.0)	69.3 (20.7)	55.6 (13.1)	44.5 (6.9)	67.5 (19.7)
Daily mean °F (°C)	32.4 (0.2)	35.6 (2.0)	45.3 (7.4)	53.5 (11.9)	63.9 (17.7)	74.4 (23.6)	79.3 (26.3)	77.7 (25.4)	70.0 (21.1)	57.0 (13.9)	43.8 (6.6)	34.2 (1.2)	55.6 (13.1)
Mean daily minimum °F (°C)	20.9 (−6.2)	23.9 (−4.5)	33.1 (0.6)	40.4 (4.7)	52.0 (11.1)	62.8 (17.1)	67.4 (19.7)	65.7 (18.7)	57.6 (14.2)	44.7 (7.1)	32.0 (0.0)	23.9 (−4.5)	43.7 (6.5)
Mean minimum °F (°C)	3.3 (−15.9)	6.4 (−14.2)	14.3 (−9.8)	26.4 (−3.1)	37.5 (3.1)	51.6 (10.9)	58.2 (14.6)	55.7 (13.2)	42.6 (5.9)	27.3 (−2.6)	15.0 (−9.4)	7.1 (−13.8)	−1.1 (−18.4)
Record low °F (°C)	−22 (−30)	−24 (−31)	−20 (−29)	10 (−12)	16 (−9)	38 (3)	44 (7)	39 (4)	26 (−3)	13 (−11)	−4 (−20)	−22 (−30)	−24 (−31)
Average precipitation inches (mm)	0.67 (17)	0.93 (24)	1.74 (44)	2.20 (56)	4.11 (104)	4.21 (107)	3.88 (99)	3.61 (92)	1.82 (46)	2.08 (53)	0.99 (25)	1.00 (25)	27.24 (692)
Average snowfall inches (cm)	5.1 (13)	2.8 (7.1)	2.7 (6.9)	0.6 (1.5)	0.0 (0.0)	0.0 (0.0)	0.0 (0.0)	0.0 (0.0)	0.0 (0.0)	0.1 (0.25)	0.3 (0.76)	3.1 (7.9)	14.7 (37.41)
Average precipitation days (≥ 0.01 in)	2.7	3.1	4.9	5.8	7.6	7.1	7.7	6.7	4.3	4.8	3.3	3.2	61.2
Average snowy days (≥ 0.1 in)	1.6	1.4	1.0	0.3	0.0	0.0	0.0	0.0	0.0	0.0	0.2	1.7	6.2
Source: NOAA (snow/snow days 1981–2010)

== Demographics ==
Historical population
Census	Pop.	Note	%±
1880	1,066		—
1890	1,861		74.6%
1900	1,583		−14.9%
1910	2,911		83.9%
1920	3,139		7.8%
1930	3,532		12.5%
1940	3,533		0.0%
1950	4,447		25.9%
1960	5,001		12.5%
1970	4,567		−8.7%
1980	4,811		5.3%
1990	4,490		−6.7%
2000	4,236		−5.7%
2010	4,054		−4.3%
2020	3,769		−7.0%
U.S. Decennial Census

=== 2020 census ===
As of the 2020 census, Larned had a population of 3,769, with 1,704 households and 919 families. The median age was 42.6 years. 23.1% of residents were under the age of 18 and 22.7% were 65 years of age or older. For every 100 females, there were 95.0 males, and for every 100 females age 18 and over, there were 90.8 males age 18 and over.

98.9% of residents lived in urban areas, while 1.1% lived in rural areas. The population density was 1,563.9 per square mile (603.8/km^{2}).

There were 1,704 households, of which 26.3% had children under the age of 18 living in them. Of all households, 39.2% were married-couple households, 20.7% were households with a male householder and no spouse or partner present, and 31.9% were households with a female householder and no spouse or partner present. About 39.0% of households were made up of individuals, and 19.8% had someone living alone who was 65 years of age or older.

There were 2,101 housing units, of which 18.9% were vacant. The homeowner vacancy rate was 3.5% and the rental vacancy rate was 22.0%. Housing density was 871.8 per square mile (336.6/km^{2}).

Racial composition as of the 2020 census
Race	Number	Percent
White	3,235	85.8%
Black or African American	91	2.4%
American Indian and Alaska Native	22	0.6%
Asian	16	0.4%
Native Hawaiian and Other Pacific Islander	2	0.1%
Some other race	65	1.7%
Two or more races	338	9.0%
Hispanic or Latino (of any race)	320	8.5%

The non-Hispanic White population was 83.15%.

Demographic estimates

The average household size was 2.0 and the average family size was 2.8. The percent of those with a bachelor's degree or higher was estimated to be 16.6% of the population.

Income and poverty

The 2016–2020 5-year American Community Survey estimates show that the median household income was $42,378 (with a margin of error of +/- $5,059) and the median family income was $54,570 (+/- $15,872). Males had a median income of $33,750 (+/- $9,271) versus $26,887 (+/- $4,236) for females. The median income for those above 16 years old was $30,481 (+/- $4,739). Approximately, 1.9% of families and 9.5% of the population were below the poverty line, including 5.8% of those under the age of 18 and 8.8% of those ages 65 or over.

=== 2010 census ===
As of the census of 2010, there were 4,054 people, 1,824 households, and 1,027 families residing in the city. The population density was 1,696.2 inhabitants per square mile (654.9/km^{2}). There were 2,130 housing units at an average density of 891.2 per square mile (344.1/km^{2}). The racial makeup of the city was 92.2% White, 2.7% African American, 0.4% Native American, 0.6% Asian, 0.1% Pacific Islander, 1.4% from other races, and 2.6% from two or more races. Hispanic or Latino of any race were 7.0% of the population.

There were 1,824 households, of which 27.0% had children under the age of 18 living with them, 42.1% were married couples living together, 10.5% had a female householder with no husband present, 3.7% had a male householder with no wife present, and 43.7% were non-families. 39.5% of all households were made up of individuals, and 18.6% had someone living alone who was 65 years of age or older. The average household size was 2.18 and the average family size was 2.89.

The median age in the city was 42.7 years. 23.9% of residents were under the age of 18; 6.8% were between the ages of 18 and 24; 21.9% were from 25 to 44; 27.9% were from 45 to 64; and 19.7% were 65 years of age or older. The gender makeup of the city was 48.0% male and 52.0% female.

== Education ==
The community is served by Fort Larned USD 495 public school district.

== Media ==
The local newspaper is Larned Tiller & Toiler.

== Economy ==
- USD 495, local school district
- Larned State Hospital, west of Larned
- Larned Correctional Mental Health Facility, west of Larned

== Area attractions ==
- Santa Fe Trail Center, 1349 K-156 Hwy, museum devoted to the history of the Santa Fe Trail.
- Fort Larned National Historic Site, located approximately 5.5 miles (8.9 km) west of the city of Larned.

== Notable people ==
- Belle Jennings Benchley, "the Zoo lady", former director of the San Diego Zoo
- Gene Keady, current Big Ten sportscaster, former head coach for the Purdue Boilermakers men's basketball team
- Hal Patterson, former professional football player and member of the Canadian Football Hall of Fame
- Glee S. Smith, Jr., former Kansas state legislator and lawyer
- Ralph Terry, retired New York Yankees pitcher, 2× All-Star (1961, 1962), 2× World Series champion (1961, 1962), World Series MVP (1962), AL wins leader (1962), former professional golfer in retirement
- Mitch Webster, retired Major League Baseball outfielder
- John Zook, former football player, all-state, all Big 8 (University of Kansas), and all-pro NFL player

== See also ==
- National Register of Historic Places listings in Pawnee County
  - Fort Larned National Historic Site
  - Patterson House
- Santa Fe Trail
