= Pawnee River =

River in Kansas, United States

Pawnee River Pawnee Fork, Otter River
- Etymology: Named for the Pawnee, a Native American tribe that once inhabited a region bounded on the south by the river

Location
- Country: United States
- State: Kansas
- Cities: Ravanna, Burdett, Rozel, Larned

Physical characteristics
- Source: Confluence of several unnamed streams and drainage channels
  - location: About 30 miles (48 km) of Garden City, in Gray County
  - coordinates: 37°57′57″N 100°35′55″W
  - elevation: 2,835 ft (864 m)
- Mouth: Arkansas River
  - location: Larned, Pawnee County
  - coordinates: 38°10′07″N 99°05′44″W
  - elevation: 1,985 ft (605 m)
- Length: 198 mi (319 km), East-northeast
- Basin size: 2,701 mi^{2} (7,000 km^{2})
- Discharge
  - location: Rozel, 22 miles (35 km) from the mouth
  - average: 57.9 cu ft/s (1.64 m^{3}/s)
  - minimum: 0 cu ft/s (0 m^{3}/s)
  - maximum: 16,300 cu ft/s (460 m^{3}/s)

Basin features
- River system: Arkansas River basin
- Tributaries
  - right: Buckner Creek

The Pawnee River or Pawnee Fork is a river in western Kansas in the United States, about 198 miles (319 km) long. It is a tributary of the Arkansas River, which in turn is a branch of the Mississippi River.

It rises in northwestern Gray County at an elevation of 2,835 feet (864 m), as the outflow of several agricultural drainage channels. For 20 miles (32 km) the river runs due north, before turning northeast near Ravanna. The river arcs to the south and receives Buckner Creek, its main tributary at the town of Burdett, then flows east past Rozel and through Fort Larned National Historic Site. It joins the Arkansas River on the left bank, south of the city of Larned.

This river drains an arid farming region of about 2,700 square miles (7,000 km^{2}) of the Great Plains. Most of its flow is consumed by irrigation before it reaches the mouth, and the river dries up for periods of months at a time in most years. The land surrounding the river was originally inhabited by the Kansa, Cheyenne, Osage, Pawnee and other tribes, the latter for which the river is named. The river was a route for the Santa Fe Trail in the 19th century, and was also the scene of Native American-U.S. wars in 1854, after which Fort Larned was established on the river to maintain a permanent military presence in the region.

== See also ==
- List of rivers of Kansas
