= List of tornadoes in the outbreak sequence of June 3–11, 2008 =

The tornado outbreak sequence of June 3–11, 2008 affected much of the central United States and parts of Canada starting on June 3, 2008 and lasting until June 11; 192 tornadoes were confirmed.

The first outbreak affected much of the Midwest and Ohio Valley area on June 3 producing over 20 tornado reports including an EF3 in Moscow, Indiana. Several people were injured, including one critically who died two months later.

The second outbreak took place across the Central Plains where two days of severe weather resulted in at least 90 tornado reports from the Dakotas to Kansas on June 4–5.

The third outbreak took place across Wisconsin and Illinois, where at least 20 tornadoes were confirmed including eight across the southern suburbs of Chicago on June 7, as well as a dozen others in southern Wisconsin.

The fourth outbreak took place across the Central Plains where at least four people were killed near Little Sioux, Iowa. At least 58 tornadoes were reported on June 11 mostly over Minnesota, Iowa, Kansas and Minnesota. The strongest tornado was an EF4 in Manhattan, Kansas. Two people were in killed in Kansas in the towns of Chapman and Soldier. At least 17 tornadoes were reported on June 11 mostly over Wisconsin and Kansas.

== Confirmed tornadoes ==
Confirmed tornadoes by Enhanced Fujita rating
EFU	EF0	EF1	EF2	EF3	EF4	EF5	Total
0	109	63	14	5	1	0	192

- Note: Four tornadoes in Canada were rated according to the Fujita scale, but are included in the table using their corresponding number rating.

=== June 3 event ===
List of reported tornadoes – Tuesday, June 3, 2008
EF#	"Location	County	Time (UTC)	Path length	Damage
Illinois
EF0	WNW Kinmundy	Marion	1254	0.06 miles (0.097 km)	Brief tornado touchdown destroyed a machine shed and flipped over a mobile home. A farm house also sustained minor roof damage.
EF0	E Alsey	Scott	0132	6.70 miles (10.78 km)	Tornado tracked through rural area and caused no damage.
Indiana
EF1	WNW Park	Greene, Lawrence	1510	27.15 miles (43.69 km)	The tornado damaged residences, trees and barns in Greene and Lawrence counties. A school was damaged in Greene County and one male suffered a broken foot after debris fell on it.
EF0	WNW Banta	Morgan	1830	0.39 miles (0.63 km)	Roof damage and several downed trees were caused by the tornado.
EF3	WNW Waldron	Shelby, Rush	0104	9.68 miles (15.58 km)	1 death – 34 structures in Shelby County were damaged, with 27 of them in the small community of Middletown, just northeast of Waldron. Eight people were injured in Rush County, including a 67-year-old woman who was impaled in the chest by a tree limb and later died as a result of her injury on August 17. A covered bridge was destroyed and a school was damaged in Moscow. The tornado severely damaged or destroyed dozens of homes, and swept ones that were not anchored completely away.
EF2	SSE Peoga	Brown, Johnson, Shelby	0124	10.59 miles (17.04 km)	Twenty to thirty homes in Brown County were damaged, as well as 40 buildings at Camp Atterbury and 59 buildings were either damaged or destroyed in Edinburgh. A gas station in Shelby County was also damaged.
EF1	SSW Springhill	Decatur	0150	4.09 miles (6.58 km)	One home had its roof torn off and another home suffered extensive damage. A van suffered broken windows and farm buildings and telephone poles were damaged.
Virginia
EF0	Southwestern Roanoke	City of Roanoke	2327	1.62 miles (2.61 km)	Trees were blown down, with some of them falling on homes. There was no direct damage to homes or structures from the tornado.
EF0	NNE Winterpock	Chesterfield	0040	0.25 miles (0.40 km)	Brief tornado touchdown snapped and downed trees.
Ohio
EF0	SW Miami University Airport	Butler	0105	0.35 miles (0.56 km)	A home had its roof blown off and a barn had half of its roof peeled off with a metal door being blown away.
EF0	S Martinsville	Clinton	0425	0.17 miles (0.27 km)	A barn and shed sustained minor damage from the tornado.
Missouri
EF1	SSE Barnumton	Camden	0525	6.03 miles (9.70 km)	Damaged occurred to a few structures and over 100 trees were snapped.
Sources:FindArticles NWS Central Illinois Virginia Department of Emergency Management NWS Wilmington (OH)

=== June 4 event ===
List of reported tornadoes – Wednesday, June 4, 2008
EF#	Location	County	Time (UTC)	Path length	Damage
Illinois
EF0	NE of Prairie	Randolph	0830	0.6 miles (0.97 km)	Tornado blew down several trees along its path and caused minor damage to a couple of machine sheds and shifted a garage on its foundation before lifting and dissipating.
EF0	WSW of Tilden	Randolph	0848	1.47 miles (2.37 km)	Three homes and one building had roof damage. Several large tree limbs were blown down.
EF0	SSW of Tilden	Randolph	0849	0.7 miles (1.1 km)	Several houses, garages and outbuildings were damaged. Numerous trees were knocked down in a cemetery.
EF1	SSW of Flanagan	Livingston	2345	3.42 miles (5.50 km)	A house suffered roof damage and a small agriculture building was blown around a larger agricultural machine shed and destroyed.
EF0	NE of Mackinaw	Tazewell	0018	2 miles (3.2 km)	Tornado remained out over an open field.
EF0	N of Lilly	Tazewell, McLean, Woodford	0024	7 miles (11.2 km)	Tornado remained out over an open field.
Indiana
EF0	WSW of Bloomfield	Greene	1113	≤0.1 mile (≤160 m)	Brief touchdown, no damage reported.
EF0	S of Wilmington	Dearborn	2200	1 mile (1.6 km)	Tornado caused minor roof damage to several trailers, mainly due to fallen trees. Damages from the tornado totaled to $30,000.
Ohio
EF0	Red Bank area	Hamilton	1150	2 miles (3.2 km)	Brief touchdown, a few homes suffered minor damages. Damages from the tornado totaled to $40,000.
Virginia
EF1	Millwood area	Clarke	1725	0.5 mile (800 m)	Brief tornado touchdown, all the trees around Cater Hall were uprooted or knocked down. Damages from the tornado totaled to $20,000.
EF0	N of Delaplane	Fauquier, Loudoun	1819	12 miles (19.3 km)	An EF0 tornado tracked through Fauquier and Loudoun counties in Virginia over a 12-mile (19 km) path. Damage from the tornado mainly consisted of broken and uprooted trees. Damages from the tornado totaled to $30,000.
EF0	E of Green Spring	Frederick	1725	0.1 mile (160 m)	Brief tornado touchdown, about a dozen trees were snapped or uprooted. Damages from the tornado totaled to $8,000.
EF1	E of Stevensburg	Culpeper	2315	4 miles (6.4 km)	Some large trees were uprooted or snapped. Damages from the tornado totaled to $15,000.
EF1	NW of Sumerduck	Fauquier, Stafford	2327	10 miles (16 km)	Numerous trees were knocked down or uprooted and some structures sustained damage. Damages from the tornado totaled to $50,000.
EF1	ESE of Glendia	Stafford	2335	1 mile (1.6 km)	Damage to many trees, and a few structures. Damages from the tornado totaled to $20,000.
Maryland
EF0	White Oak area	Montgomery	1920	0.1 miles (1.6 km)	Brief touchdown, a few trees were downed. Damages from the tornado totaled to $2,000.
EF0	Chesapeake Beach	Calvert	1940	1.5 miles (2.4 km)	About 20 houses were damaged, mostly to roofs and siding. A restaurant also lost part of its roof. Numerous trees were knocked down. Damages from the tornado totaled to $400,000.
EF0	W of Preston	Caroline	2012	2.2 miles (3.5 km)	A strong EF0 tornado touched down near Preston and moved into the town. About 30 homes were damaged and numerous trees were uprooted. Damages from the tornado totaled to $300,000.
Colorado
EF0	S of Hyde	Washington	2029	0.1 mile (160 m)	Brief touchdown, no damage reported.
EF0	SSW of Yuma	Yuma	2101	1 mile (1.6 km)	Brief touchdown, no damage reported.
EF0	NNE of Strasburg	Adams	2104	0.1 mile (160 m)	Brief touchdown, no damage reported.
EF0	N of Wray	Yuma	0026	0.1 mile (160 m)	Brief touchdown, no damage reported.
Kentucky
EF0	Peach Grove area	Pendleton	2220	0.5 mile (800 m)	Damage to several barns and homes, including a garage that was blown out. Damages from the tornado totaled to $60,000.
Nebraska
EF1	S of Champion (1st tornado)	Chase	2249	0.5 mile (800 m)	Brief touchdown, tornado overturned three pivot irrigation systems, down several trees, and broke three power poles. Damages from the tornado totaled to $110,000.
EF0	ENE of Dannevirk	Howard	2253	4 miles (6.4 km)	Damage was limited to trees and power poles. Damages from the tornado totaled to $150,000.
EF0	SSW of Champion (2nd tornado)	Chase	2308	0.1 mile (160 m)	Brief touchdown, tornado overturned a pivot irrigation system. Caused $40,000 in damages.
EF0	S of Champion (3rd tornado)	Chase	2313	0.1 mile (160 m)	Brief touchdown, tornado destroyed small outbuildings, tore off the roof of the garage and slammed it into the nearby house, and tore the roof off the house. Damages from the tornado totaled to $25,000.
EF0	NE of Wauneta	Chase	2353	0.1 mile (160 m)	Brief touchdown, no damage reported.
EF1	W of Dwight	Butler	0100	6 miles (9.6 km)	Tornado damaged a few grain bin silos. Numerous trees were also downed. Damage is unknown.
EF0	NE of Hamlet	Hayes	0110	0.1 mile (160 m)	Brief touchdown, no damage reported.
EF1	S of Ulysses (1st tornado)	Seward, Butler	0125	5 miles (8 km)	Tornado damaged an irrigation system and several homes. Numerous trees were also downed. Damage is unknown.
EF1	Ceresco area (1st tornado)	Saunders	0137	6 miles (9.6 km)	A large, half-mile-wide tornado destroyed 4 homes and 225 power poles, as well as damaged 101 other homes. Several barns suffered severe damage with metal parts from the walls found scattered all over nearby fields. Highway 77 was closed for more than a day as debris from the tornado littered the roads. Due to the large amount of power poles taken down, power was out for much of Ceresco for several days. The total cost of the damage is unknown but likely extreme.
EF1	S of Ulysses (2nd tornado)	Seward, Butler	0144	4 miles (6.4 km)	Tornado damaged four homes in Ulysses, and flipped numerous pivot irrigation systems. Numerous trees were also downed. Damage is unknown.
EF1	Ceresco area (2nd tornado)	Saunders	0155	5 miles (8 km)	Tornado downed numerous trees and power lines. Damage is unknown.
EF0	Bertrand area	Phelps	0423	0.1 mile (160 m)	Brief touchdown, no damage reported.
EF0	W of Smithfield	Gosper	0428	0.1 mile (160 m)	Brief touchdown, no damage reported.
Iowa
EF1	S of Pacific Junction	Mills	2304	5 miles (8 km)	Tornado caused scattered tree and farm damage.
EF1	S of Emerson	Mills	2350	4.5 miles (7.2 km)	Tornado destroyed two barns and a machinery storage shed and severely damaged one home.
EF1	ENE of Creston	Union	0004	1 mile (1.6 km)	Tornado reported by amateur radio operator.
EF0	WNW of Nodaway	Adams	0113	2 miles (3.2 km)	Brief touchdown, no damage reported.
EF1	N of Brooks	Adams	0124	9 miles (14.4 km)	Rain-wrapped tornado according to KCCI. Damages from the tornado totaled to $15,000.
EF1	SE of Corning	Adams	0137	8.6 miles (14 km)	One house lost part of its roof and several outbuildings destroyed. Several houses and cars had damage caused by falling trees.
EF1	SW of Stringtown	Adams	0158	6 miles (9.6 km)	Damages totaled to $30,000.
EF0	NW of Kent	Union	0218	1 mile (1.6 km)	A farm was damaged with outbuildings destroyed. Power poles knocked over. The tornado was reassessed and found to be an EF0, not an EF1, and the track was 5.2 miles (8.4 km) shorter than originally thought. Damages from the tornado totaled to $5,000.
EF1	ENE of Afton	Union, Clarke	0258	11 miles (17.6 km)	Long track tornado followed for storm chasers. Damages from the tornado totaled to $10,000.
Sources: FindArticles NWS Chicago

=== June 5 event ===
List of reported tornadoes – Thursday, June 5, 2008
EF#	Location	County	Coord.	Time (UTC)	Path length	Damage
Colorado
EF0	SSW of Granada	Prowers	37°52′N 102°21′W	1815	7 miles (11.2 km)	Weak EF0 tornado remained out over open fields for the duration of its life, however, it narrowly missed a ranch, but broke the fencing. Damages from the tornado totaled to $5,000
Kansas
EF0	SW of Russell Springs (1st tornado)	Logan	38°49′N 101°10′W	1930	1 mile (1.6 km)	Brief touchdown, no damage reported
EF0	SSW of Russell Springs (2nd tornado)	Logan	38°52′N 101°11′W	1941	1 mile (1.6 km)	Brief touchdown, no damage reported
EF1	NNE of Preston	Pratt	38°49′N 101°10′W	1959	1 mile (1.6 km)	Brief touchdown, tornado was moving at 60 mph (97 km/h). A pivot irrigation sprinkler was knocked over. Damages from the tornado totaled to $65,000.
EF0	S of Gove	Gove	38°47′N 100°28′W	2013	1 mile (1.6 km)	Brief touchdown, no damage reported
EF0	WNW of Voda (1st tornado)	Trego	39°03′N 100°03′W	2039	1 mile (1.6 km)	Brief touchdown, no damage reported
EF0	S of Voda (2nd tornado)	Trego	39°01′N 100°01′W	2040	2 miles (3.2 km)	Brief touchdown, no damage reported
EF1	W of Oak Hill	Clay	39°15′N 97°21′W	2119	14 miles (22.5 km)	Tornado destroyed seven structures and damaged numerous others. Damages are unknown.
EF0	SE of Idana	Clay	39°21′N 97°13′W	2120	5 miles (8 km)	Damage occurred to power lines and outbuildings. Damages are unknown.
EF1	N of Clay Center	Clay	39°25′N 97°07′W	2133	10 miles (16 km)	Minor damage to several houses, including siding ripped off and windows broken. Several outbuildings were destroyed. Damages are unknown.
EF0	W of Barnes	Washington	39°42′N 96°52′W	2208	0.1 mile (160 m)	Several buildings sustained minor damage as well as an outbuilding. Damages are unknown.
EF0	E of Oketo	Marshall	39°58′N 96°33′W	0041	0.1 mile (160 m)	Brief tornado touchdown with no damage.
EF0	S of Sycamore Springs	Brown	39°57′N 95°43′W	0027	0.1 mile (160 m)	Brief tornado touchdown with no damage.
EF0	NE of Prescott	Linn	38°05′N 94°40′W	0357	1 mile (1.6 km)	Tornado damaged or destroyed several barns and sheds. Damages are unknown.
Nebraska
EF2	S of Stuart	Rock, Holt	42°12′N 99°27′W	2044	30 miles (48.2 km)	Long-track multiple vortex tornado moved a house off its foundation. In addition, numerous outbuildings were destroyed, power poles were snapped and farm equipment and vehicles were thrown. Damages from the tornado totaled to $225,000.
EF1	SSW of Johnson (1st tornado)	Nemaha	40°17′N 96°03′W	2320	3 miles (4.8 km)	Tornado damaged an outbuilding and snapped numerous trees. Damages are unknown.
EF1	SSW of Johnson (2nd tornado)	Nemaha	40°17′N 96°03′W	2323	7 miles (11.2 km)	Tornado damaged several farmsteads. Damages are unknown.
EF1	SW of Johnson (3rd tornado)	Nemaha	40°24′N 96°01′W	2335	1 mile (1.6 km)	Brief touchdown, tornado damaged an outbuilding and snapped numerous trees. Damages are unknown.
EF0	S of Preston	Richardson	40°00′N 95°31′W	0033	1 mile (1.6 km)	Brief touchdown, no damage reported.
EF2	SE of Falls City	Richardson, Holt (MO), Atchison (MO)	40°04′N 95°31′W	0039	29 miles (46.6 km)	A large half-mile-wide tornado destroyed several outbuildings and sheds, damaged numerous buildings, and downed power poles. Damages from the tornado totaled to $435,000.
South Dakota
EF1	WNW of Marty	Charles Mix	42°59′N 98°27′W	2200	10 miles (16 km)	Tornado destroyed several outbuildings and damaged a few structures. Damages from the tornado totaled to $100,000.
EF0	SW of Humboldt	Minnehaha	43°37′N 97°00′W	0115	2 miles (3.2 km)	Brief touchdown, no damage reported.
EF2	SSW of Baltic	Minnehaha	43°43′N 96°46′W	0142	3 miles (4.2 miles)	Tornado damaged numerous structures and downed several trees. Damages are unknown.
EF0	SW of Trent	Moody	43°51′N 96°41′W	0200	1 mile (1.6 km)	Brief touchdown, tornado blew a 40 by 100-foot (30 m) metal machine shed a quarter mile, destroyed an outbuilding, and damaged trees. Damages from the tornado totaled to $10,000.
Missouri
EF0	SE of Watson	Atchison	40°28′N 95°37′W	2355	0.5 mile (800 m)	Brief touchdown in open country with no damage.
EF0	WSW of Tarkio	Atchison	40°25′N 95°02′W	0023	0.1 mile (160 m)	Brief touchdown, no damage reported.
EF0	W of Craig	Holt	40°12′N 95°23′W	0055	3.5 miles (5.6 km)	No direct tornado damage, however the wind downdraft caused tractor trailers to blow on Interstate 29 with drivers trapped and at least one having to be extricated. Damages from the tractor trailers totaled to $2,000.
EF0	Foster area	Bates	38°10′N 94°31′W	0415	0.1 mile (160 m)	Damage primarily to trees, some of which were uprooted. Damages from the tornado totaled to $25,000.
EF0	SW of Alma	Lafayette	39°05′N 93°33′W	0523	0.1 mile (160 m)	Brief touchdown, damage was confined to one porch. Damages from the tornado totaled to $500.
Iowa
EF0	WNW of Payne	Fremont	40°40′N 95°47′W	0002	1 mile (1.6 km)	Brief touchdown, no damage reported.
EF0	NNE of Sidney	Fremont	40°48′N 95°37′W	0011	1 mile (1.6 km)	Brief touchdown, no damage reported.
EF0	S of Essex	Page	40°48′N 95°18′W	0024	1 mile (1.6 km)	Brief touchdown, tornado caused minor damage to a barn.
EF0	N of Cumberland	Cass	41°17′N 94°52′W	0112	2 miles (3.2 km)	Brief touchdown, no damage reported.
EF1	NW of Creston	Union	41°04′N 94°23′W	0224	3 miles (4.8 km)	Tornado blew the roof off an outbuilding. Damages from the tornado totaled to $25,000.
EF1	ENE of Leslie	Clarke	40°56′N 93°45′W	0449	8 mile (12.8 km)	No damage reported.
EF1	NNW of Liberty	Warren, Marion	41°13′N 93°31′W	0510	18 miles (28.9 km)	Two homes and several outbuildings were damaged. Damages from the tornado totaled to $190,000.
EF1	S of Prairie City	Jasper	41°33′N 93°13′W	0536	10 mile (16 km)	Tornado damaged twelve outbuildings and downed numerous trees. Damages from the tornado totaled to $75,000.
EF1	SE of Reasnor	Jasper	41°34′N 93°00′W	0545	14 miles (22.5 km)	Several buildings were damaged and tractor trailers were blown off Interstate 80. Two people were injured. Damages from the tornadoes totaled to $255,000.
EF0	NNE of Newton	Jasper	41°44′N 93°01′W	0549	11 mile (17.6 km)	Tornado damaged several homes. Damages from the tornadoes totaled to $25,000.
Oklahoma
EF0	NW of Beggs	Okmulgee	35°47′N 96°08′W	0435	4 miles (6.4 km)	Tornado blew down power lines and power poles. Damages from the tornado totaled to $15,000.
Sources: SPC Storm Reports for June 5, 2008, NWS Kansas City #1, NWS Kansas City #2, NWS Omaha, NWS Sioux Falls, NWS Topeka, NWS Topeka PNS, NWS North Platte NCDC Storm Data

=== June 6 event ===
List of reported tornadoes – Friday, June 6, 2008
EF#	Location	County	Coord.	Time (UTC)	Path length	Damage
Minnesota
EF2	E of Menahga	Wadena, Hubbard	46°45′N 95°04′W	1414	14 miles (22.5 km)	Tornado tracked mostly over forest areas but a small house was destroyed along with eight turkey barns, killing over 15,000 turkeys and injuring one person. Hundreds of acres of forest was destroyed as well. Damages from the tornado totaled to $11.3 million.
EF3	SW of Emmaville	Hubbard	46°58′N 95°01′W	1437	7 miles (11.2 km)	Two homes on Pickerel Lake were flattened. Several other houses were damaged, and outbuildings flattened. Dozens of acres of forest were flattened. Damages from the tornado are unknown.
EF0	NNE of Dorset	Hubbard	46°59′N 94°55′W	1442	5.5 miles (8.8 km)	Tornado split off from the Emmaville tornado and caused mainly tree damage along its path. Damages from the tornado totaled to $100,000.
EF1	S of Lake George	Hubbard	47°09′N 94°59′W	1455	2.5 miles (4.0 km)	Many large trees were knocked down. Damages from the tornado totaled to $400,000.
EF1	ESE of Badoura	Hubbard	46°51′N 94°43′W	1543	0.5 mile (800 m)	Brief touchdown, tornado downed up to 4 acres (16,000 m^{2}) of forest. Damages from the tornado totaled to $200,000.
Wisconsin
EF0	N of Kansasville	Racine	42°43′N 88°08′W	1958	3.3 miles (5.3 km)	Tornado touched down in rural area. Damage confined to trees. Damages from the tornado totaled to $20,000.
Oklahoma
EF0	S of Hulbert	Cherokee	35°52′N 95°09′W	2047	0.1 mile (160 m)	Brief touchdown in an open field, no damage reported.
Michigan
EF0	N of Campbells Corners	Ogemaw	44°21′N 84°07′W	2055	0.9 mile (1.4 km)	Brief touchdown, tornado damaged several farms and residences. Damages from the tornado totaled to $75,000.
Illinois
EF1	Lerna area	Coles	39°24′N 88°19′W	2120	5 miles (8 km)	Tornado damaged nine homes and a school. Damages from the tornado totaled to $275,000.
Ontario
F1	Echo Bay	Algoma		2200	unknown	Roof was torn off a warehouse and damage to a tractor dealership.
Ohio
EF1	SW of Wetsel	Van Wert	40°55′N 84°28′W	0044	0.5 mile (800 m)	One house sustained siding and roof damage. Numerous trees were snapped. Damages from the tornado totaled to $5,000.
Sources: SPC Storm Reports for June 6, 2008, NWS Grand Forks, Environment Canada (Northern Ontario), NWS Northern Indiana, NWS Lincoln, IL, NWS Grand Forks update NCDC Storm Data

=== June 7 event ===
List of reported tornadoes – Saturday, June 7, 2008
EF#	Location	County	Coord.	Time (UTC)	Path length	Damage
Wisconsin
EF0	SE of Millville	Grant	43°03′N 90°05′W	1852	0.3 mile (482 m)	Brief touchdown. Damages from the tornado totaled to $800.
EF1	NE of Briggsville	Adams, Marquette	43°41′N 89°36′W	1857	5.5 miles (8.8 km)	Tornado damaged five homes and five barns. Damages from the tornado totaled to $352,000.
EF2	ENE of Pardeeville	Columbia	43.53333°N 89.26306°W	1932	9 miles (14.4 km)	An enormous, 2-mile-wide multi-vortex tornado damaged 214 buildings, 2 of which were destroyed. Tens of thousands of trees were either uprooted or chewed. The damage path from the tornado showed several paths of varying damage within one large system. A tree farm of 6000 trees was completely destroyed as well. Damages from the tornado totaled to $2.5 million.
EF0	SW of Beaver Dam	Columbia, Dodge	43.41413°N 89.01782°W	2005	3 miles (4.8 km)	Damage was confined to trees.
EF1	South Randolph area	Columbia, Dodge	43.49298°N 89.01509°W	2008	2 miles (3.2 km)	Tornado destroyed one home and damaged a barn. Damages from the tornado totaled to $300,000.
EF0	SW of Plain	Sauk	43.26431°N 90.07778°W	2016	0.1 mile (160 m)	Brief tornado touchdown, no damage reported.
EF0	NE of Cottage Grove	Dane	43.0901°N 89.15824°W	2025	0.1 mile (160 m)	Tornado touched down in a field with no damage.
EF0	NW of Sun Prairie	Dane	43.21357°N 89.25815°W	2038	0.1 mile (160 m)	Brief touchdown, no damage reported.
EF0	E of Lake Mills	Jefferson	43.0901°N 89.15824°W	2049	0.1 mile (160 m)	Brief touchdown, no damage reported.
EF1	N of Stoughton	Dane	42.92395°N 89.25369°W	2140	4 miles (6.4 km)	Tornado damaged 49 buildings and destroyed a tobacco shed. Damages from the tornado totaled to $429,000.
EF0	S of Eagle	Waukesha	42.85852°N 88.47545°W	2237	0.1 mile (160 m)	Brief touchdown, no damage reported.
EF0	NE of Token Creek	Dane	43.21357°N 89.25815°W	2238	0.1 mile (160 m)	Brief touchdown, no damage reported.
EF1	ENE of Barre Mills	La Crosse	43°50′N 91°04′W	2245	5.5 miles (8.8 km)	Tornado on the ground with debris. Two barns were destroyed while another one as well as a farmhouse had roof damage. Damages from the tornado totaled to $103,000.
EF0	Liberty Pole area	Vernon	43°28′N 90°54′W	2248	0.1 mile (160 m)	Shed damage and machinery thrown into fields. Damages from the tornado totaled to $15,000.
Illinois
EF0	E of Cornell	Livingston	40°58′N 88°40′W	2121	0.8 mile (1.3 km)	Brief touchdown, no damage reported. First of eight tornadoes from a single supercell thunderstorm.
EF1	SSE of Nevada	Livingston	41°03′N 88°33′W	2131	3.6 miles (5.8 km)	Tornado snapped utility poles, blew off half of the roof to a barn, and damaged one home. Damages from the tornado totaled to $50,000. Second of eight tornadoes from a single supercell thunderstorm.
EF2	NW of Essex	Kankakee, Will	41°12′N 88°12′W	2218	13.6 miles (21.8 km)	Tornado destroyed a two-story home and damaged several others. Numerous trees and power lines were knocked down as well. Damages from the tornado totaled to $500,000. Third of eight tornadoes from a single supercell thunderstorm.
EF2	NE of Wilton Center	Will	41°21′N 87°55′W	2251	1.8 miles (2.8 km)	A garage was destroyed and a metal outbuilding was heavily damaged. Damages from the tornado totaled to $50,000. Fourth of eight tornadoes from a single supercell thunderstorm.
EF2	NW of Peotone	Will	41°24′N 87°51′W	2255	3.7 miles (5.9 km)	Tornado destroyed several barns, a garage, and a horse shed. Several other structures sustained moderate to severe damage. Damages from the tornado totaled to $500,000. Fifth of eight tornadoes from a single supercell thunderstorm.
EF2	Richton Park area	Will, Cook	41°26′N 87°46′W	2313	5.8 miles (9.3 km)	A mobile home and outbuilding were destroyed, four high voltage power poles were blown down at high end EF2 intensity. A warehouse, several homes, an apartment complex, a car wash and a grocery store also sustained significant damage. Six people were injured on Interstate 57. Damages from the tornado totaled to $9.5 million. Sixth of eight tornadoes from a single supercell thunderstorm.
EF1	Chicago Heights area	Cook	41°28′N 87°39′W	2332	2 miles (3.2 km)	The roof of a warehouse was lifted out and several homes had minor damage. Numerous trees fell including two that caused significant damage to homes. Damages from the tornado totaled to $1 million. Seventh of eight tornadoes from a single supercell thunderstorm.
EF0	Lansing area	Cook	41°34′N 87°31′W	2348	0.7 miles (1.1 km)	Damage limited to tree limbes with one fallen into a car. Damages from the tornado totaled to $10,000. Last of eight tornadoes from a single supercell thunderstorm.
Iowa
EF1	S of Thompson	Winnebago	43°21′N 93°46′W	2041	6 miles (9.6 km)	Rain wrapped tornado. Tornado hit hog confinement building and destroyed it. A barn was also damaged. Damages from the tornado totaled to $260,000.
EF0	WSW of Northwood	Worth	43°25′N 93°01′W	2116	2 miles (3.2 km)	Brief touchdown, debris cloud spotted. Damages from the tornado totaled to $1,000.
EF0	SSE of Northwood	Worth	43°25′N 93°12′W	2123	2 miles (3.2 km)	Brief touchdown, debris cloud spotted. Damages from the tornado totaled to $5,000.
EF0	NW of Stacyville	Mitchell	43°27′N 92°48′W	2150	0.1 mile (160 m)	Brief touchdown, no damage reported.
EF0	WSW of Saint Ansgar	Mitchell	43°21′N 93°01′W	2228	1 mile (1.6 km)	Brief touchdown, debris cloud spotted. Damages from the tornado totaled to $1,000.
EF0	NW of Mason City	Cerro Gordo	43°27′N 92°48′W	2242	1 mile (1.6 km)	Brief touchdown, debris cloud spotted. Damages from the tornado totaled to $5,000
Minnesota
EF0	NNW of Perkins	Houston	43°49′N 91°40′W	2150	0.1 mile (160 m)	Brief touchdown, no damage reported.
Kansas
EF0	SW of Bloomington	Osborne	39°16′N 98°52′W	2355	0.1 mile (160 m)	Brief touchdown, no damage reported.
EF0	S of Portis	Osborne	39°31′N 98°41′W	0128	0.1 mile (160 m)	Brief touchdown, no damage reported.
EF0	ESE of Harlan	Smith	39°34′N 98°40′W	0137	0.1 mile (160 m)	Brief touchdown, no damage reported.
Sources: SPC Storm Reports for June 7, 2008, NWS Omaha, NWS Chicago, NWS La Crosse, NWS Milwaukee NCDC Storm Data

=== June 8 event ===
List of reported tornadoes – Sunday, June 8, 2008
EF#	Location	County	Coord.	Time (UTC)	Path length	Damage
Nebraska
EF2	Omaha area (1st tornado)	Sarpy, Douglas	41°08′N 96°16′W	0710	11 miles (17.6 km)	Tornado touched down as an EF1 and destroyed a garage in Sarpy County. Scattered EF0 damage was found through the town of Gretna where roof damage was found. Before crossing into Douglas County, the tornado intensified into an EF2 and caused major roof damage to a home. After crossing into Douglas County, the second tornado in the Omaha area merged into the first around 132nd street and Westwood Lane. The tornado tore roofs off of a few homes and damaged several others. The tornado then moved into Omaha and knocked out power to 13,800 customers. It dissipated after moving through the city. Despite all the damage, only three people were injured.
EF1	Omaha area (2nd tornado)	Douglas	41°12′N 96°14′W	0712	8 miles (12.8 km)	The second tornado to hit the Omaha area touched down as an EF0 and took off the decking of a home. The tornado remained weak until briefly becoming an EF1 before merging with the larger, EF2 tornado that just entered Douglas County.
Michigan
EF1	E of Reed City	Osceola	43°51′N 85°25′W	1920	5 miles (8 km)	Large half-mile-wide tornado flattened a half mile wide swath of forest and damaged a barn. Rated a high-end EF1 with winds of 110 mph (180 km/h)
EF1	Lansing area	Eaton, Ingham	42°42′N 84°49′W	2145	11 miles (17.6 km)	Tornado mainly caused damage to trees but a house had its porch and garage destroyed.
Iowa
EF0	SW of Gravity	Taylor	40°44′N 94°46′W	2035	1 mile (1.6 km)	Tornado blew windows in several houses and downed trees. Damages from the tornado totaled to $55,000.
EF1	SW of Pickering	Marshall	41°54′N 92°50′W	2110	1 mile (1.6 km)	Tornado completely destroyed a pole shed. Damages from the tornado totaled to $32,000.
EF1	N of Highland Center	Wapello	41°08′N 92°21′W	0030	2 miles (3.2 km)	A home lost the roof and the wall of one room was partially collapsed. Several trees were down around the home as well. Damages from the tornado totaled to $80,000.
Ontario
F1	Lucan	Middlesex		2100	0.6 mile (1 km)	A shed lost its entire roof.
F0	NW of Watford	Lambton		2200	unknown	Tornado spotted along Highway 402 with no damage.
F1	Ruthven	Essex		unknown	unknown	Reported by police and trained weather spotters, courtesy CBET-TV and CBLT-TV.
Texas
EF0	NNE of Quitaque	Briscoe	34°31′N 100°58′W	0215	0.1 mile (160 m)	Brief touchdown, no damage reported.
Sources: SPC Storm Reports for June 8, 2008, CTV Southwestern Ontario, Ontario Storms.com, NWS Grand Rapids # 1, NWS Grand Rapids # 2 NCDC Storm Data

=== June 9 event ===
List of reported tornadoes – Monday, June 9, 2008
EF#	Location	County	Coord.	Time (UTC)	Path length	Damage
Minnesota
EF1	E of Halstad	Norman	47°21′N 96°45′W	1844	0.25 mile (400 m)	Brief tornado damaged a farm building and knocked down a few trees. Damages from the tornado totaled to $40,000.
Sources: NWS Grand Forks update NCDC Storm Data

=== June 10 event ===
List of reported tornadoes – Tuesday, June 10, 2008
EF#	Location	County	Coord.	Time (UTC)	Path length	Damage
Wyoming
EF1	E of Four Corners	Weston, Pennington (SD)	44°02′N 104°00′W	0050	8 miles (12.8 km)	Tornado touched down in the Black Hills National Forest. Many trees were snapped or blown down. No structures were damaged.
Sources: NWS Rapid City NCDC Storm Data

=== June 11 event ===
List of reported tornadoes – Wednesday, June 11, 2008
EF#	Location	County	Coord.	Time (UTC)	Path length	Damage
South Dakota
EF1	W of Sisseton	Marshall	45°39′N 97°15′W	1051	0.25 mile (400 m)	Brief touchdown, tornado threw a metal shed 100 yards (91 m), destroying it.
Iowa
EF0	S of George	Lyon	43°19′N 96°00′W	2225	0.1 mile (160 m)	Brief touchdown, no damage reported.
EF0	NW of Ashton	Osceola	43°20′N 95°49′W	2229	1 mile (1.6 km)	Brief touchdown, no damage reported.
EF0	W of Pierson	Woodbury	42°32′N 95°58′W	2237	1 mile (1.6 km)	Brief touchdown, no damage reported.
EF0	E of Paullina (1st tornado)	O'Brien	42°58′N 95°40′W	2249	1 mile (1.6 km)	Brief touchdown, no damage reported.
EF2	E of Paullina (2nd tornado)	O'Brien	42°58′N 95°32′W	2306	6 miles (9.6 km)	Tornado destroyed several outbuildings, moved a 1.5 ton wagon, heavily damaged a machine shed containing farm equipment and also damaged a nearby house on the same farm. Also destroyed another machine shed at a different location, destroyed a pole barn, damaged a grain bin, broke or blew down several power poles and power lines, and caused tree damage. Damages from the tornado totaled to $200,000.
EF1	S of Calumet	O'Brien	42°55′N 95°33′W	2320	1 mile (1.6 km)	Tornado damaged a hoop barn. Damages from the tornado totaled to $5,000.
EF2	S of Spencer	Clay	43°00′N 95°16′W	2340	13 miles (20.9 km)	Tornado destroyed or heavily damaged numerous outbuildings on at least 8 affected farmsteads, with damaged buildings including several large sheds. The tornado damaged numerous grain bins, most of which were carried off their foundations, with some being carried as much as a half mile. The tornado also overturned a camper, blew the top off a silo, destroyed a garage, broke windows on a house, and caused considerable damage to trees, power poles, and power lines.
EF0	NNE of Dickens	Clay	43°09′N 95°01′W	0011	0.1 mile (160 m)	Brief touchdown, no damage reported.
EF0	NE of Castana	Monona	42°07′N 95°49′W	0020	0.1 mile (160 m)	Brief touchdown, no damage reported.
EF0	S of Charter Oak	Crawford	42°01′N 95°35′W	0021	1 mile (1.6 km)	Brief touchdown, no damage reported.
EF0	NNE of Webb	Clay	42°58′N 94°59′W	0025	0.1 mile (160 m)	Brief touchdown, no damage reported.
EF0	NW of Defiance	Shelby	41°51′N 95°22′W	0059	0.1 mile (160 m)	Brief touchdown, no damage reported
EF0	S of Defiance	Shelby	41°46′N 95°20′W	0105	0.1 mile (160 m)	Brief touchdown, no damage reported.
Minnesota
EF1	NE of Wilmont	Nobles, Murray	43°50′N 95°36′W	2246	4 miles (6.4 km)	Two farms were hit, with significant damage to outbuildings. Damages from the tornado totaled to $70,000.
EF1	W of Fulda	Murray	43°52′N 95°47′W	2300	3 miles (4.8 km)	Roof damage, manufactured house pushed off foundation, outbuildings damaged. One person was injured. Damages from the tornado totaled to $100,000.
EF0	N of Jeffers	Cottonwood	44°07′N 95°11′W	2345	2 miles (3.2 km)	Brief touchdown, no damage reported.
EF1	WSW of Leavenworth	Brown	44°12′N 94°52′W	0020	1 mile (1.6 km)	Tornado destroyed two barns, a farm shop, five pickup trucks, a semi-tractor, and a farm tractor. Damages from the tornado totaled to $300,000.
EF1	NW of Sleepy Eye	Brown	44°19′N 94°45′W	0046	0.1 mile (160 m)	Brief touchdown, tornado destroyed a barn and shed. Damages from the tornado totaled to $100,000.
EF1	WNW of Essig	Brown	44°21′N 94°40′W	0052	2 mile (3.2 km)	Tornado destroyed a grain bin along with a few sheds and outbuildings. A pole barn had its roof partially removed. Damages from the tornado totaled to $100,000.
EF0	ENE of Gaylord	Sibley	44°34′N 94°01′W	0206	0.1 mile (160 m)	Brief touchdown, no damage reported.
Nebraska
EF3	N of Little Sioux (IA)	Burt, Harrison (IA), Monona (IA)	41°48′N 96°07′W	2325	14 miles (22.5 km)	4 deaths – See section on this tornado
EF0	N of Elkhorn	Douglas	41°22′N 96°14′W	2359	0.1 mile (160 m)	Brief touchdown, no damage reported.
EF0	E of Greenwood	Cass	40°57′N 96°26′W	0039	0.1 mile (160 m)	Brief touchdown, no damage reported.
EF1	W of Louisville	Cass	40°58′N 96°01′W	0050	5 miles (8 km)	Tornado formed 4 miles (6.4 km) west of Louisville over Platte River State Park and caused minimal damage to trees before dissipating 2 minutes after touching down.
EF0	N of Jansen	Jefferson	40°12′N 97°04′W	0138	0.1 mile (160 m)	Brief touchdown, no damage reported.
Kansas
EF0	NE of Olmitz	Barton	38°31′N 98°55′W	2313	1 mile (1.6 km)	Brief touchdown, no damage reported.
EF1	NE of Claflin	Barton, Ellsworth	38°37′N 98°03′W	2345	9 miles (14.4 km)	Long track tornado confirmed. Several barns and sheds were damaged, along with many trees. Damages from the tornado totaled to $65,000.
EF0	WNW of Ellsworth	Ellsworth	38°45′N 98°16′W	0011	1 mile (1.6 km)	Brief touchdown, no damage reported.
EF0	S of Olmitz	Barton	38°28′N 98°56′W	0035	1 mile (1.6 km)	Brief touchdown, no damage reported.
EF0	NE of Claflin	Barton	38°32′N 98°30′W	0057	1 mile (1.6 km)	Brief touchdown, no damage reported.
EF0	S Lorraine	Ellsworth	38°34′N 98°21′W	0115	1 mile (1.6 km)	Brief touchdown, 13 power poles were knocked down. Damages from the tornado totaled to $9,800.
EF0	S Brookville	Saline	38°43′N 97°51′W	0148	2 miles (3.2 km)	Brief touchdown, no damage reported.
EF3	Salina area	Saline	38°45′N 97°40′W	0240	16 miles (25.7 km)	Tornado damaged several buildings. Damages from the tornado totaled to $2.6 million.
EF3	NNW of Enterprise to Chapman to W of Junction City	Dickinson, Geary	38°53′N 97°06′W	0312	15.26 miles (24.1 km)	1 death – See section on this tornado
EF0	Carlton area	Dickinson	39°40′N 97°16′W	0345	0.1 mile (160 m)	Brief touchdown, no damage reported.
EF4	Manhattan area	Riley	39°18′N 96°57′W	0348	8.64 miles (13.9 km)	See section on this tornado
EF0	SSE of Flush	Pottawatomie	39°16′N 96°25′W	0420	5 miles (8 km)	Tornado remained out over open fields.
EF2	Soldier area	Pottawatomie, Jackson, Nemaha	39°27′N 96°06′W	0446	17 miles (27.3 km)	1 death – Fatality was in a mobile home. Numerous outbuildings were destroyed. Many other houses were damaged along with farm buildings and trees. 4 people were injured.
Sources: SPC Storm Reports for June 10, 2008, SPC Storm Reports for June 11, 2008, NWS Omaha, NWS Wichita, NWS Sioux Falls, NWS Topeka NCDC Storm Data

== See also ==
- Weather of 2008
- List of North American tornadoes and tornado outbreaks
- List of F4 and EF4 tornadoes
  - List of F4 and EF4 tornadoes (2000–2009)
- Tornadoes of 2008
