= Tornadoes of 2008 =

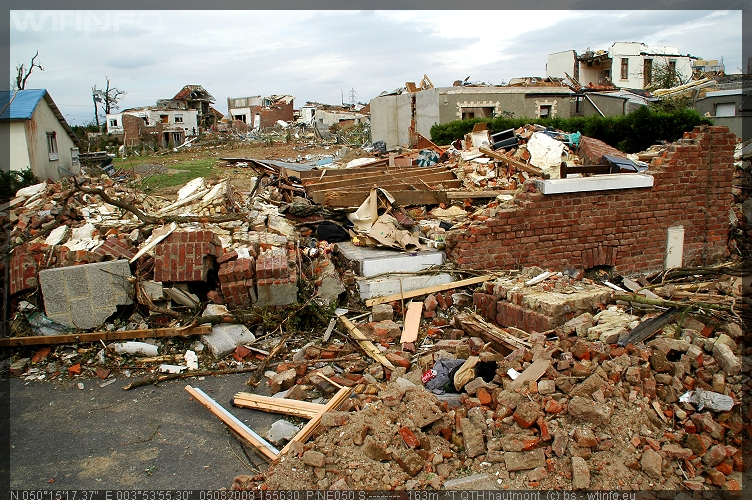
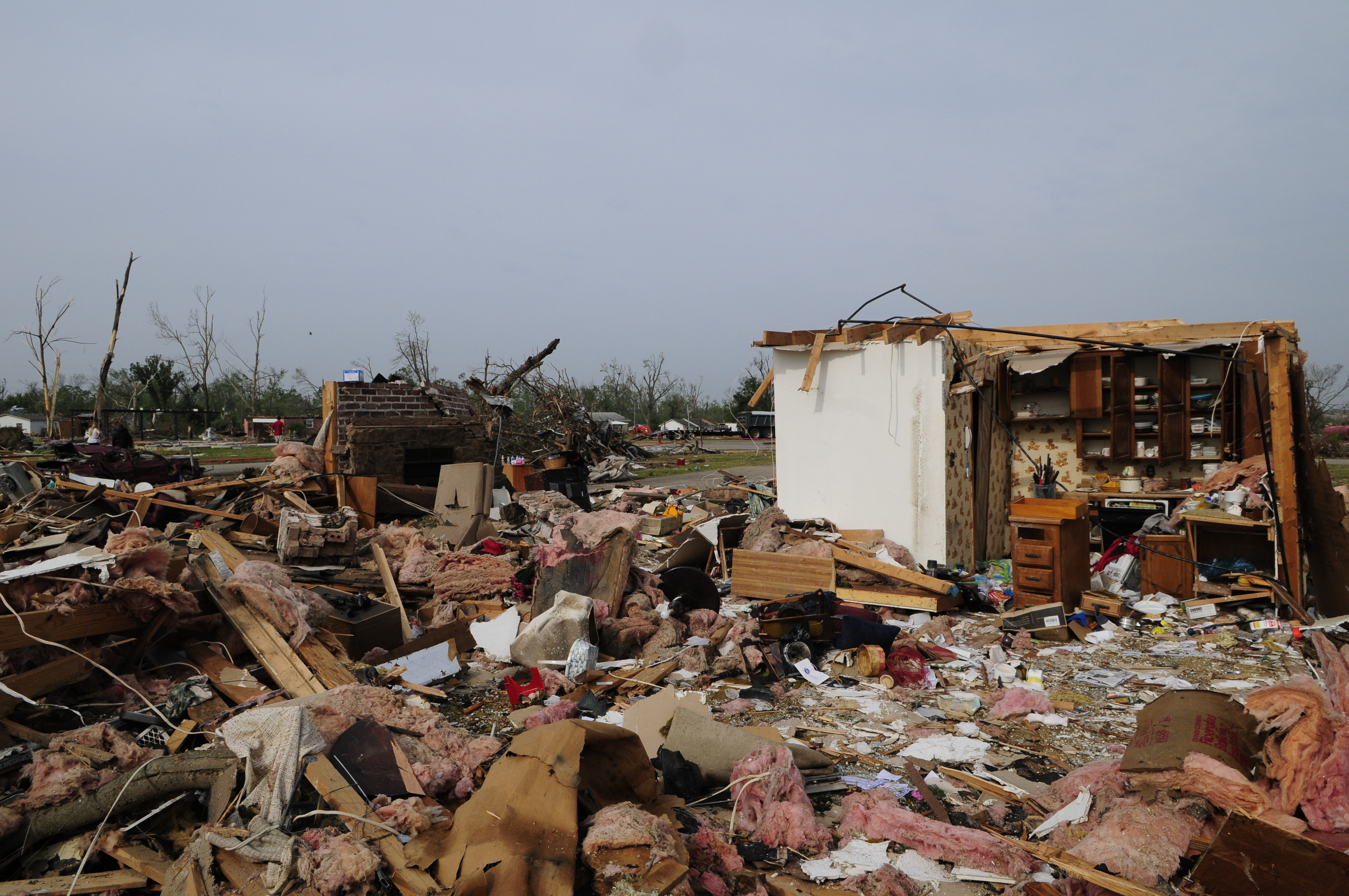
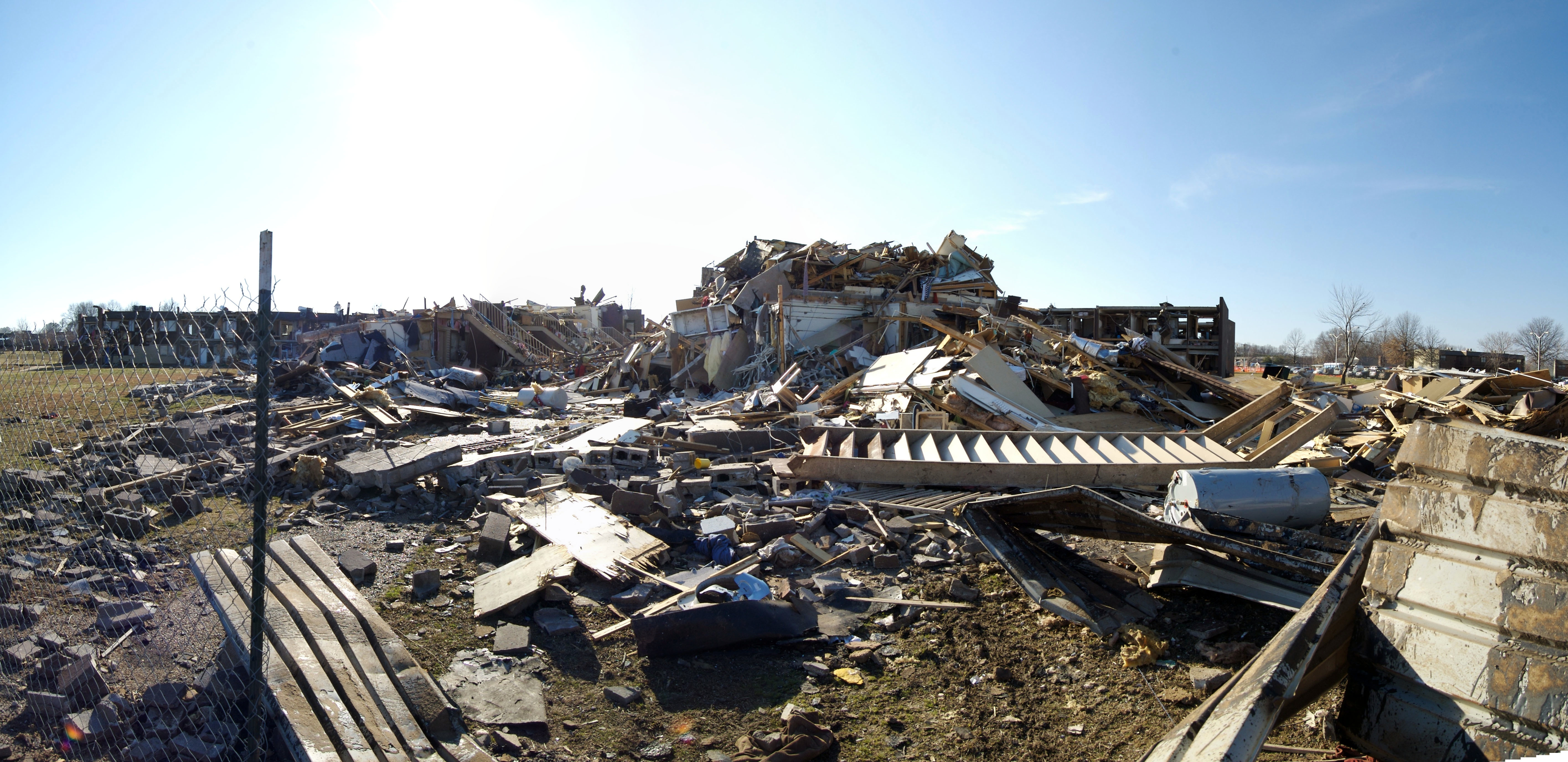
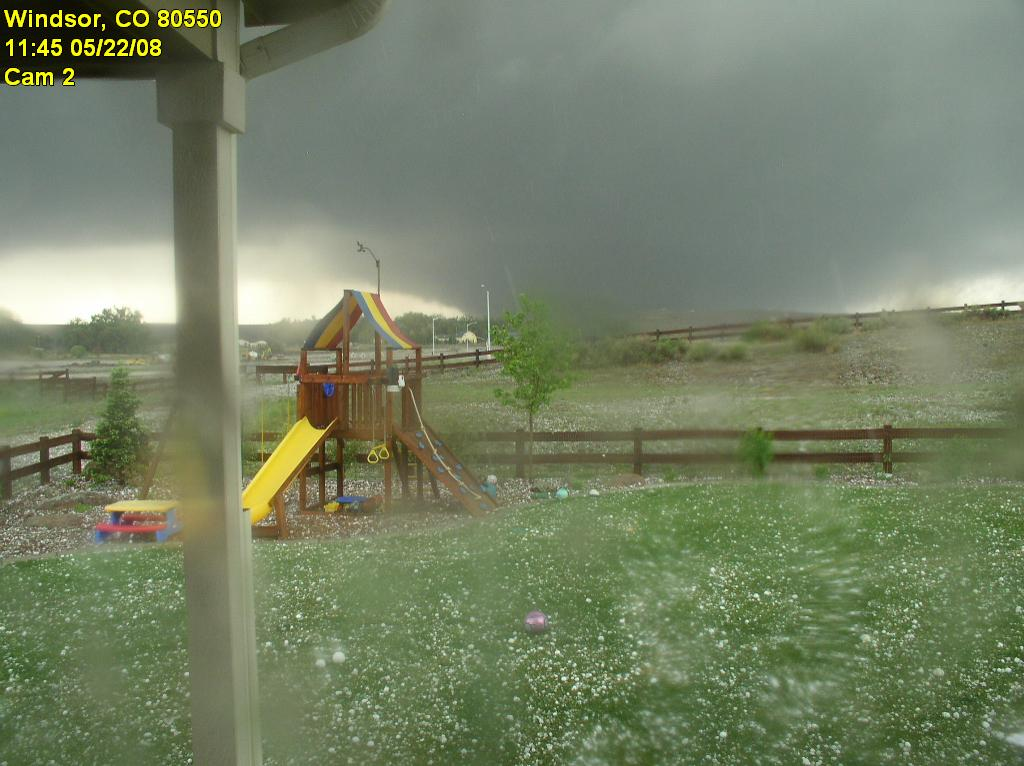
- Clockwise from top: An EF5 tornado after impacting Parkersburg, Iowa on May 25; significant damage to a masonry-style building, following an F4 tornado in Hautmont, France on August 3; a panoramic view of college dorms destroyed by an EF4 tornado that impacted the Union University campus in Jackson, Tennessee on February 5; a CCTV frame still, showing a large EF3 tornado that impacted Windsor, Colorado on May 22; severe damage to a frame home in Picher, Oklahoma, after an EF4 tornado on May 10; NEXRAD radar evolution of a long-tracked EF4 tornado that went through Atkins and Clinton, Arkansas on the evening of February 5.
- Timespan: January 7 – December 27, 2008
- Maximum rated tornado: EF5 tornado: Parkersburg–New Hartford, Iowa on May 25
- Tornadoes in U.S.: 1,692
- Damage (U.S.): ~$1.84 billion
- Fatalities (U.S.): 126
- Fatalities (worldwide): 152

This page documents notable tornadoes and tornado outbreaks worldwide in 2008. Strong and destructive tornadoes form most frequently in the United States, Bangladesh, and Eastern India, but they can occur almost anywhere under the right conditions. Tornadoes also develop occasionally in southern Canada during the Northern Hemisphere's summer and somewhat regularly at other times of the year across Europe, Asia, and Australia. Tornadic events are often accompanied with other forms of severe weather, including strong thunderstorms, strong winds, and hail.

There were 1,692 tornadoes confirmed in the United States in 2008, with 126 confirmed fatalities. This made 2008 the deadliest year in that country since 1998. Fatalities were also reported elsewhere in the world: Eighteen in China, three in France, two each in Bangladesh and Poland, and one in Russia. With 1,692 confirmed tornadoes, 2008 ranked as the fourth most active US tornado season on record; only 2011, 2024, and 2004 have had more tornadoes confirmed with 1,715, 1,796 and 1,817, respectively. The US state of Kansas received the most tornadoes in the United States in 2008 with 187.

== Synopsis ==
The winter months of January and February (usually a fairly quiet time of year for severe weather) were unusually active in 2008 in the US, with several major outbreaks taking place. The first major outbreak took place on the week of January 7, which was unusually far north for January. February saw a new record for tornadoes in that month, with one of the most prolific outbreaks in recent years (and the deadliest since 1985) taking place on February 5, and three smaller outbreaks also taking place later in the month. March was also fairly active, but not at record levels. Steady activity in the first week of the month, an outbreak on March 15 and additional activity at month's end were mostly responsible. April was also active, which was due to steady tornado activity throughout the month despite the fact there were no prolific outbreaks.

From the beginning of May until mid-June, severe weather was frequent and widespread across the US. Beginning with a significant outbreak on May 2, there were many major outbreaks over that period with smaller outbreaks occurring almost daily. Over that six-week period, well over 600 tornadoes were reported in the US, with many destructive tornadoes over that time frame. The worst tornado events were on May 10, May 22–23, May 25 and June 11.

After that, activity calmed down somewhat to a more normal pace in the second half of June and into July with several smaller severe weather events. The summer and early fall months from July to September ran somewhat above average in the US; tropical cyclones and their remnants were mostly responsible for the tornado activity from mid-August through mid-September. This was seen particularly from Tropical Storm Fay, Hurricane Gustav and Hurricane Ike, each of which resulted in large numbers of mostly weak tornadoes. Activity dropped significantly in October, with below normal activity and no major outbreaks. The relative inactivity continued into November before returning to a slightly above normal rate in December, with most of the activity taking place in the middle of the month.

Overseas, the months of July and August were quite active in Europe with several significant tornado events, including at least one major outbreak. NOAA also concluded there "is no evidence for a detected change in tornado activity to date due to greenhouse gas emission increases."

== Events ==
=== United States yearly total ===
Confirmed tornadoes by Enhanced Fujita rating
EFU	EF0	EF1	EF2	EF3	EF4	EF5	Total
0	985	498	151	49	9	1	1,692

Fatal United States tornadoes in 2008
- Approximate touchdown location of killer tornadoes in 2008
Summary of tornadoes
- January 7 – Missouri (3 deaths)
- January 8 – Arkansas (1 death)
- January 29 – Indiana (2 deaths)
- January 29 – Indiana (1 death)
- February 5 – Arkansas (13 deaths)
- February 5 – Arkansas (1 death)
- February 5 – Mississippi, Tennessee (3 deaths)
- February 5 – Tennessee (3 deaths)
- February 5 – Tennessee (3 deaths)
- February 5 – Kentucky (3 deaths)
- February 5 – Tennessee, Kentucky (22 deaths)
- February 6 – Kentucky (4 deaths)
- February 6 – Alabama (4 deaths)
- February 6 – Alabama (1 death)
- February 12 – Louisiana (1 death)
- February 26 – Alabama (1 death)
- March 7 – Florida (1 death)
- March 14 – Georgia (1 death)
- March 15 – Georgia (2 deaths)
- May 2 – Arkansas (5 deaths)
- May 2 – Arkansas (1 death)
- May 8 – North Carolina (1 death)
- May 10 – Oklahoma, Missouri (21 deaths)
- May 10 – Missouri (1 death)
- May 11 – Georgia (2 deaths)
- May 22 – Colorado (1 death)
- May 23 – Kansas (2 deaths)
- May 25 – Iowa (9 deaths)
- May 25 – Minnesota (1 death)
- June 3 – Indiana (1 death)
- June 11 – Nebraska, Iowa (4 deaths)
- June 11 – Kansas (1 death)
- June 11 – Kansas (1 death)
- July 24 – New Hampshire (1 death)
- September 3 – Louisiana (2 deaths)
- November 15 – North Carolina (1 death)
- November 15 – North Carolina (1 death)
Total fatalities: 126

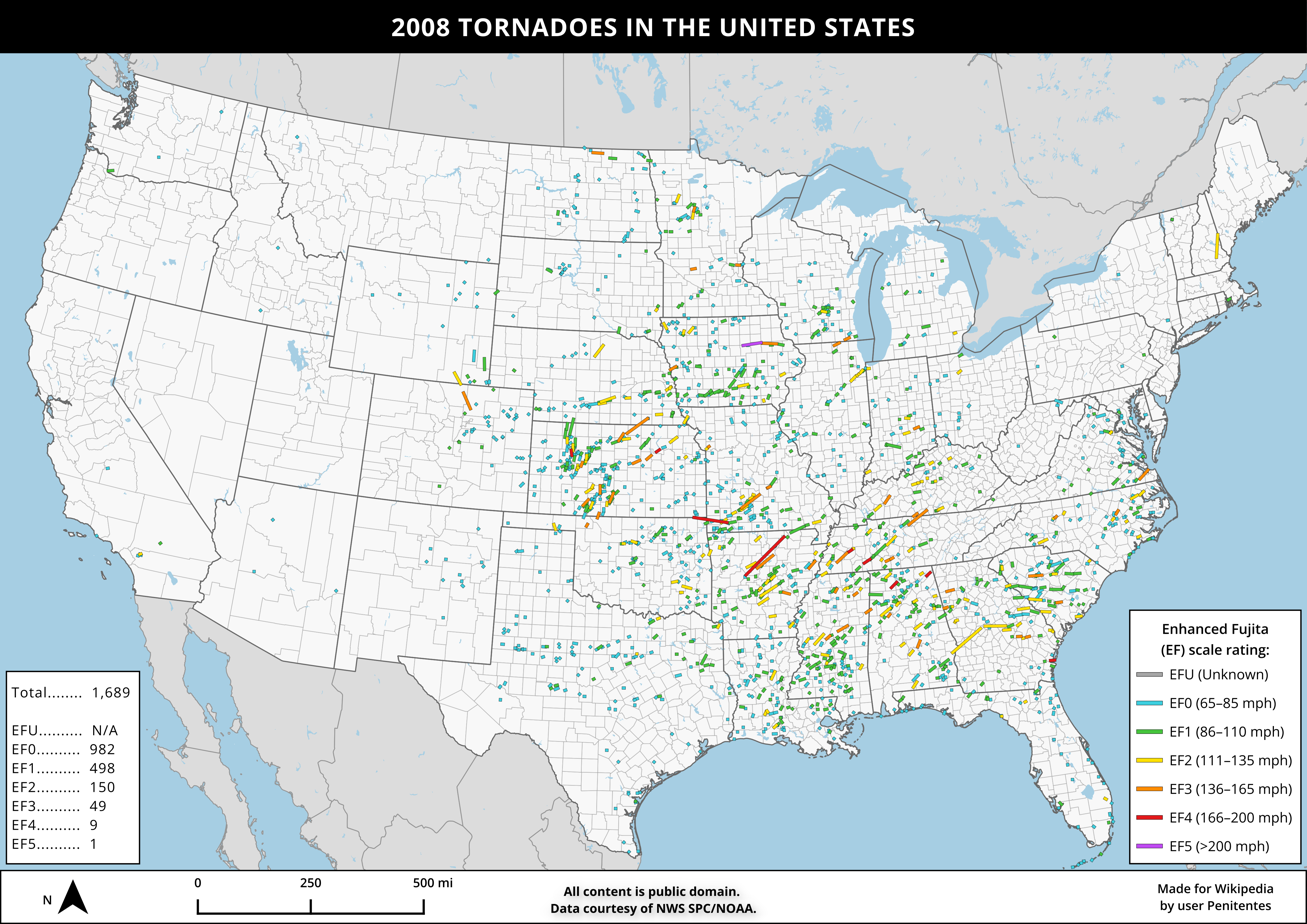
A map of 2008 United States tornado paths from the results of storm surveys.

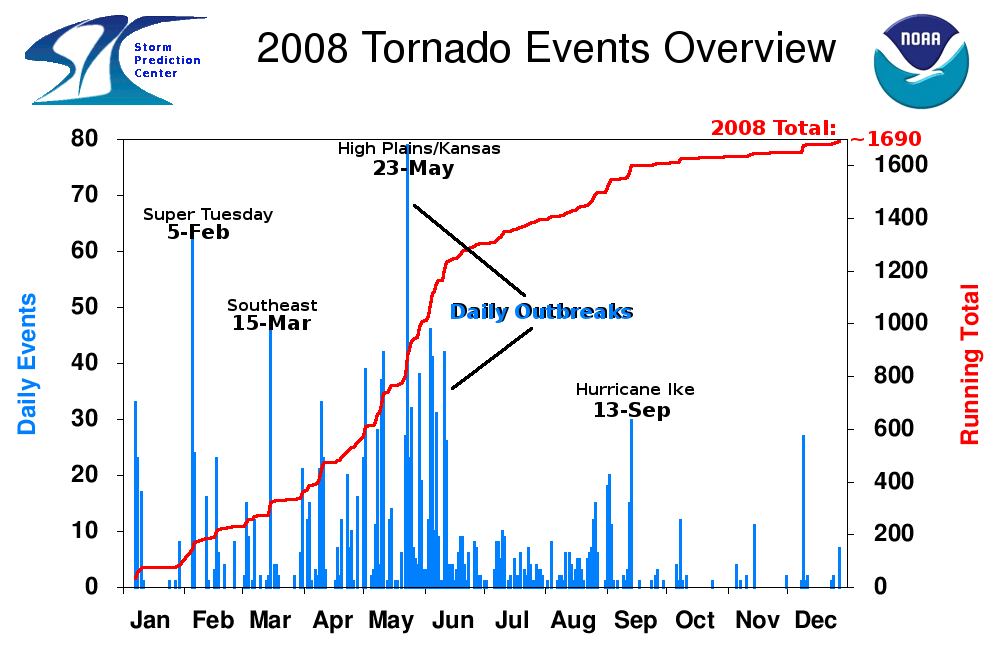
Daily tornado count and some major outbreaks during 2008

== January ==
There were 136 tornadoes reported in the United States in January, of which 84 were confirmed.

=== January 7–11 ===
EFU	EF0	EF1	EF2	EF3	EF4	EF5
0	29	29	7	8	0	0

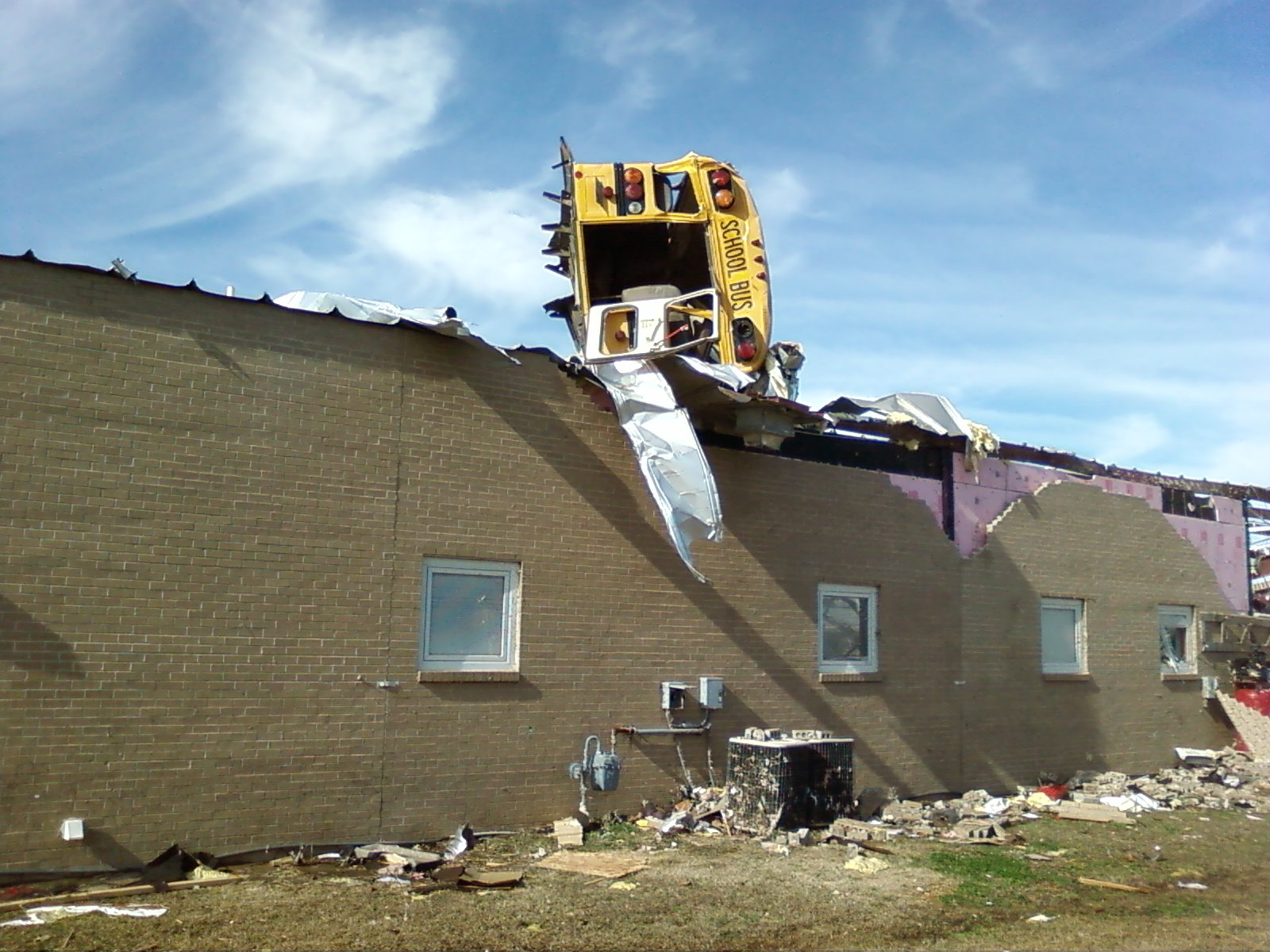
School bus that was lifted and dropped onto the roof of a damaged school in Caledonia, Mississippi on January 10, 2008

A rarity for January in the Midwest, the first significant severe weather event of the year developed in the Central U.S on January 7. Over 70 tornadoes were reported that day, including major tornadoes dominated by two supercell areas.

In the late afternoon, a rare series of tornadoes took place in northern Illinois and southeastern Wisconsin. EF3 tornadoes caused major damage in and around Wheatland, Wisconsin and Lawrence, Illinois. A train carrying hazardous materials was derailed in Lawrence, prompting an evacuation of the town. The Wheatland tornado was only the second January tornado on record in Wisconsin, with the other being on January 24, 1967.

Another round of tornadoes took place in the Springfield, Missouri area. An EF1 impacted part of downtown Springfield itself. Major damage to numerous farms, mobile homes, and frame homes Marshfield and Strafford due to a long-tracked EF3 that killed three people. On January 8, more severe weather took place, including an EF2 tornado near Appleton, Arkansas that killed one person in a mobile home. Soon after the previous outbreak, another severe weather event occurred across the Southern United States on January 10 as a new system moved across the region. The Storm Prediction Center upgraded the threat to a moderate risk late that morning as tornadoes were expected, particularly in Alabama, Mississippi and Tennessee. 20 tornadoes were reported, and four EF3 tornadoes were confirmed, including in Attala, Lowndes, and Choctaw Counties in Mississippi, and Tuscaloosa County, Alabama. A tornado emergency was also issued for Lamar County, Alabama after one of these large wedge tornadoes caused extensive damage to a school and homes across the Mississippi-Alabama state line in Caledonia, Mississippi and in areas west of Vernon, Alabama.

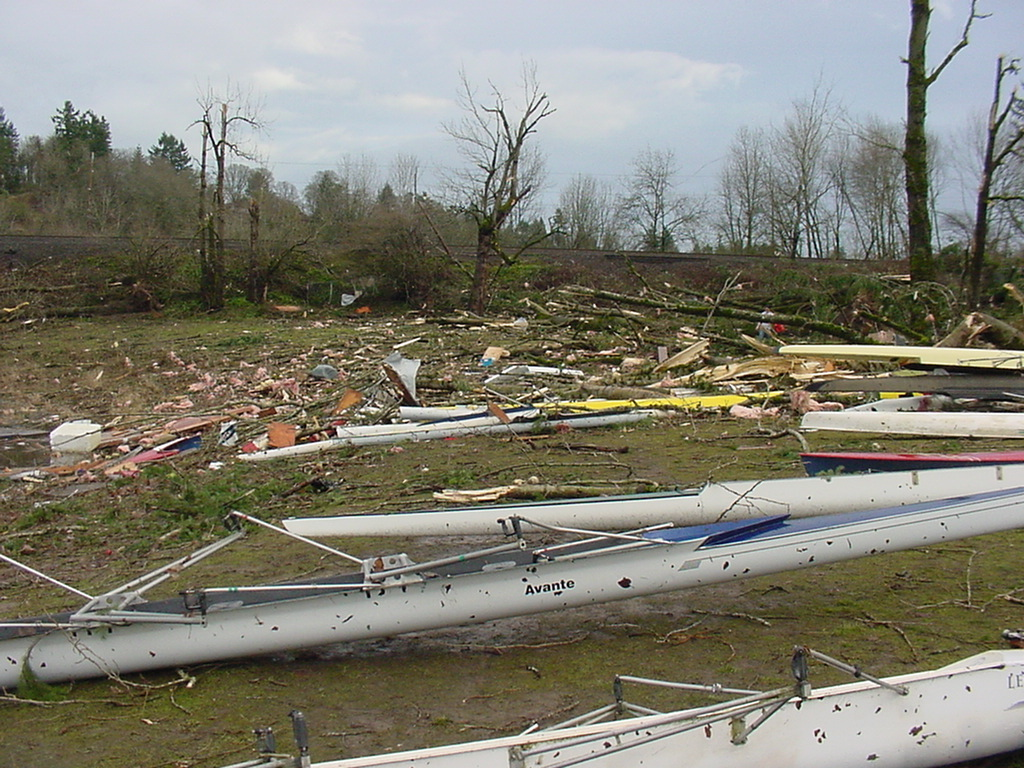
Damage to a marina in Vancouver, Washington.

Farther to the west on the afternoon of January 10, a rapidly advancing cold front generated a severe thunderstorm in Clark County, Washington, and the National Weather Service briefly posted a tornado warning. A rare EF1 tornado then developed near Vancouver Lake, moving east into Hazel Dell and Hockinson while sporadically in contact with the ground. The initial touchdown was at 12:15 p.m. PST (2015 UTC), near the intersection of NW 78th St. and NW Hazel Dell Blvd. The tornado then caused intermittent EF1-level damage while tracking to the northeast. It knocked down about 200 trees, snapped 19 power poles, and left minor damage to 30–40 houses. The damage corridor extended 10.11 miles (16.27 km) in length and 440 yards (400 m) in width. The storm was a rare event in the Pacific Northwest. The tornado was accompanied by several funnel clouds, and an advisory issued stated that more funnel clouds were possible. A funnel cloud was also seen to the south of the tornado in Gresham, Oregon.

Damage reports showed widespread downed power lines, malfunctioning traffic lights, and roofing that had been ripped off. The majority of the damage was light in nature. More than 200 trees, with diameters ranging from 12 inches (300 mm) to more than 36 inches (910 mm), were damaged, three small structures were destroyed, and a semi trailer was tipped over. Vancouver Lake Crew's facilities on the east shore of Vancouver Lake were demolished in the storm with several dozen sculling boats damaged. At least 126,000 customers lost power because of the storm, which caused around $525,000 (2008 USD) in damage.

Overall, the outbreak sequence resulted in four fatalities and 73 tornadoes.

=== January 21 (Belgium) ===
A T3 (high-end F1) tornado touched down in Limburg, Belgium late on January 21. The tornado was on the ground for a short time, traveling 1.4 miles (2.3 km) with an average width of 55 yards (50 m). Substantial damage was caused to roofs and barns.

=== January 29 ===
EFU	EF0	EF1	EF2	EF3	EF4	EF5
0	1	6	1	0	0	0

A very powerful cold front tracked across the central US on January 29, with extremely cold weather behind the front. A moderate risk of severe weather was issued for parts of the lower Ohio Valley. Five tornadoes were reported across the region, although most of the damage was due to straight-line winds which caused significant and widespread damage across the Ohio Valley region with winds of up to 100 miles per hour (160 km/h).

It was later found that two people were killed in a mobile home in Posey County, Indiana by an isolated EF2 tornado embedded in the squall line. A third fatality took place in Clark County due to an EF1 tornado. Other tornadoes hit Speedway, Indiana and a suburban area in Louisville, both of which were EF1. Two other deaths took place in Arkansas from straight-line wind damage.

== February ==
There were 230 tornadoes reported in the United States in the month of February, of which 147 were confirmed. That set a new monthly record for February.

=== February 5–6 ===
EFU	EF0	EF1	EF2	EF3	EF4	EF5
0	31	30	16	5	5	0

A powerful low pressure system over the Central Plains started to move eastward beginning on February 4. On the morning of February 4, the Storm Prediction Center issued a slight risk of severe weather from Central Texas to the Lower Ohio Valley. At the same time, a moderate risk of severe weather for February 5 was issued for parts of the Lower Mississippi Valley and the Lower Ohio Valley westward to the Ozarks, which was surrounded by a large slight risk area. However, on February 4, the thunderstorm cells remained elevated and linear, and no tornadoes were reported.

On the morning of February 5, a high risk was issued for part of the region, particularly Arkansas, for the threat of strong to violent tornadoes. Later that morning, the high risk area was expanded to cover the Lower Ohio Valley as well. It was the first high risk issued in February since 1998.

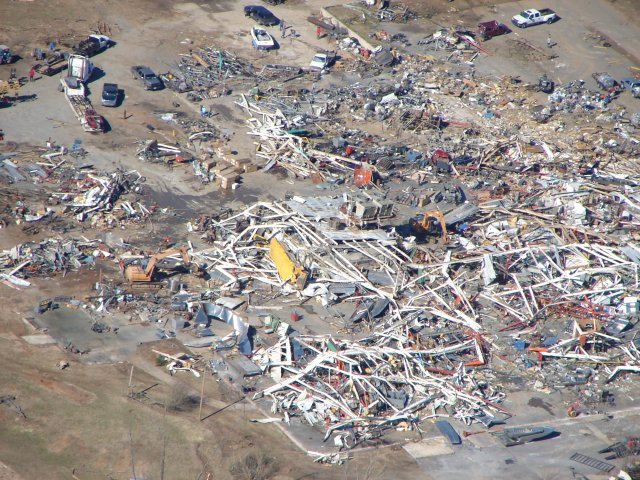
Aerial view of a destroyed boat plant in Van Buren County, Arkansas

131 tornadoes were reported, with 87 confirmed. At 5:30 pm CST (2330 UTC), several tornadoes were reported near Memphis and a tornado emergency was issued for much of the Memphis metropolitan area after a large and dangerous EF2 tornado was reported near Horn Lake, Mississippi. Major damage was reported across Southaven and Southeast Memphis, including industrial buildings destroyed and severe damage to the Hickory Ridge Mall. At the Memphis International Airport, an airline hangar had its roof removed, and the FedEx fire station suffered roof damage. Four fatalities were reported, three in a Metropolitan Memphis office complex and one in Somerville, Tennessee.

Another tornado emergency was declared around 7:00 pm CST (0100 UTC) for Jackson, Tennessee, followed by another one around 7:30 pm CST (0130 UTC) for areas to the northeast. Union University sustained heavy damage and was closed until February 18. Two fatalities were reported in Huntersville and two were killed near Morris Chapel in Hardin County as a result of the severe weather.

Massive damage was reported in Sumner County after a tornado sparked a natural gas explosion at a gas pumping plant in Macon County just northeast of Nashville. Seven fatalities were confirmed in Sumner County and 13 were killed in Macon County, with reports of injuries numbering in the hundreds. Two additional deaths were reported in nearby Trousdale County. All 22 deaths were caused by one tornado, rated an EF3, making this the deadliest single tornado to hit Middle Tennessee in 75 years and the deadliest in the US since the 2005 Evansville tornado. In total, 57 people died in the outbreak.

=== February 12–13 ===
EFU	EF0	EF1	EF2	EF3	EF4	EF5
0	12	5	0	0	0	0

Another low pressure system tracked across the Gulf Coast and Florida on February 12. 21 tornadoes were reported across the region after a squall line broke into bow echo segments. One EF1 and five EF0 tornadoes were confirmed. A woman was killed in Independence, Louisiana when she was picked up and thrown outside a hospital. Other tornadoes took place in Cocoa Beach and Everglades City, Florida.

=== February 16–18 ===
EFU	EF0	EF1	EF2	EF3	EF4	EF5
0	8	18	5	1	0	0

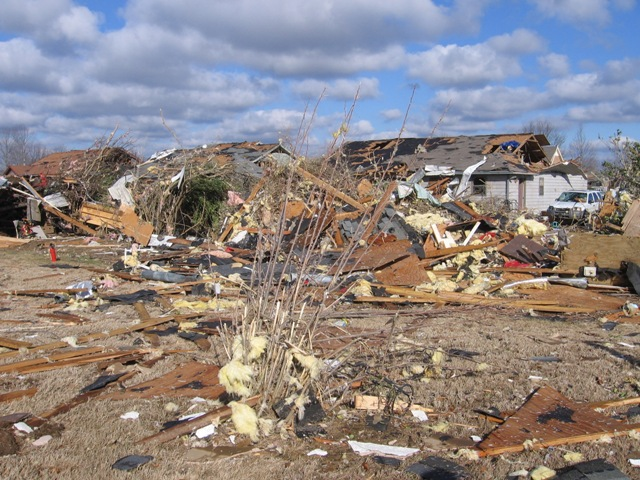
Damage to a subdivision by the Prattville-Millbrook EF3 tornado

A cold front moved across the Southern United States beginning on February 16. One confirmed tornado in Pointe Coupee Parish, Louisiana left damage path over 8 miles (13 km) long, leaving one home severely damaged. There were no deaths or injuries reported. Additional activity took place in Texas that afternoon, but far less than expected. This event continued into February 17 with the presence of a longwave trough and strong upper-level winds over the Central Gulf Coast States, and new supercells developed later that day, producing tornadoes across the Florida Panhandle and Alabama. 24 tornadoes were confirmed out of the 50 reports (however, some were later confirmed as straight-line winds). Severe damage was also reported in Prattville, Alabama, although no fatalities were reported. An EF2 tornado in Greene County, North Carolina injured three people. Two mobile homes had their roofs torn off and a two-story home was leveled. In the mid-afternoon, a tornado emergency was issued for the area around Prattville, Alabama, and a long-track EF3 tornado was confirmed in the area, injuring 50, but killing no one.

=== February 26 ===
EFU	EF0	EF1	EF2	EF3	EF4	EF5
0	3	4	0	1	0	0

Another system tracked across the Deep South beginning late on February 25 and continuing into February 26. Several tornadoes took place on the latter day embedded in a serial derecho which hit the region hard with 90 miles per hour (140 km/h) winds. The strongest tornado was an EF3 near Carrollton, Georgia, in the early morning of February 26.

One person was killed in Leeds, Alabama after a tree crashed into a mobile home. Initially thought to have been straight-line winds, it was later confirmed as an EF1 tornado.

== March ==
There were 150 tornadoes reported in the United States in the month of March, of which 129 were confirmed.

=== March 2–4 ===
EFU	EF0	EF1	EF2	EF3	EF4	EF5
0	11	13	2	0	0	0

On the morning of March 2, the Storm Prediction Center issued a moderate risk of severe weather across parts of the Lower Mississippi Valley for March 3, as a significant severe weather event was expected. The Day 2 Convective Outlook cited the potential for strong tornadoes in the moderate risk area, as well as the potential for large hail and damaging winds. The threat carried over to Day 1 and was extended to the central Gulf Coast.

The first round of activity began on the afternoon of March 2, with supercells developing across Oklahoma with isolated severe weather reports, and a couple unconfirmed tornadoes in what was primarily a wind event. More activity took place on March 3, with a notable tornado in Amite County, Mississippi that severely damaged two homes. However, overall activity was less than expected. The severe weather continued on March 4 across the Southeast and Mid-Atlantic States, where several more tornado reports and widespread wind damage was reported. One person was killed in a mobile home in Blount County, Tennessee by straight-line winds.

=== March 6–7 ===
EFU	EF0	EF1	EF2	EF3	EF4	EF5
0	6	5	2	0	0	0

A low pressure system tracked across the Southern United States on March 6 and 7. It produced several tornadoes along the immediate Gulf Coast, including an EF1 in Corpus Christi, Texas on March 6. In the overnight and early morning of March 7, a squall line tracked across the Gulf of Mexico and into Northern Florida, with supercells forming within it. Other tornadoes took place near Lake City where two people were killed (one indirectly) and about 50 homes were damaged.

=== March 14–15 ===
EFU	EF0	EF1	EF2	EF3	EF4	EF5
0	11	16	16	3	0	0

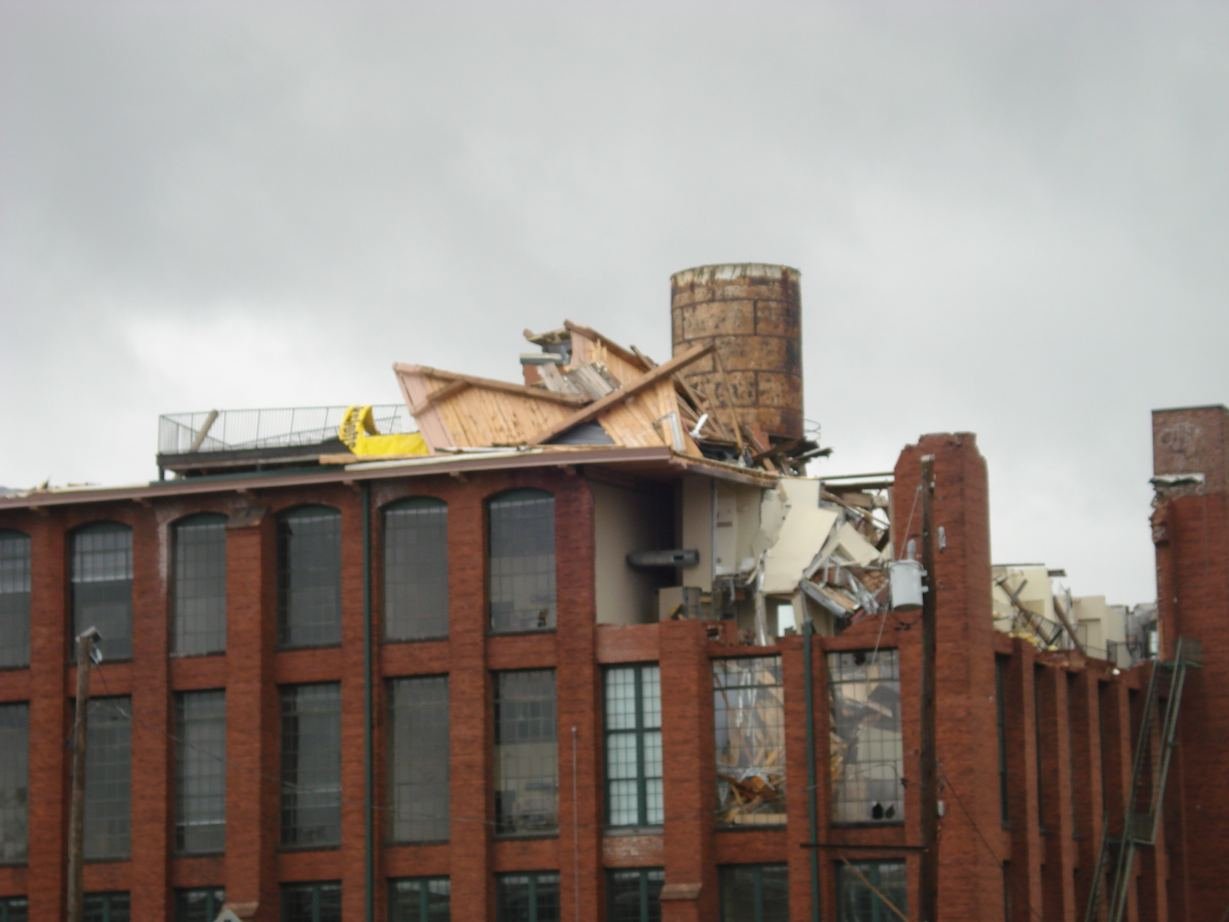
The Atlanta tornado severely damaged this Loft building on March 14, 2008

An isolated supercell in West-Central Georgia produced an EF2 tornado that struck Downtown Atlanta on the evening of March 14. It caused severe damage to several buildings, including the Georgia Dome (where an SEC Tournament basketball game was being played as the tornado struck), the World Congress Center, Philips Arena (an Atlanta Hawks game was also interrupted here), and CNN Center. Many windows were blown out of the Omni Hotel, which was evacuated. Nine people were injured and there was one death from the tornado. The tornado was later to have a path length of about 6 miles (9.7 km) long and 200 yards (180 m) wide. The Georgia insurance commissioner's office made a final cost tally of a half-billion dollars (100 million at the GWCC alone), making it one of the most expensive tornadoes in history.

On March 15, a moderate risk of severe weather was issued for the same area, with more tornadoes possible. At midday, the risk area was extended to the Carolina Coast. Later that day, a high risk was issued for Northern Georgia and part of South Carolina. Two people were killed in Georgia by a tornado. A tornado emergency was also issued on the afternoon of March 15 for Atlanta and its immediate suburbs for a tornado that did not occur, although the extremely ominous rotating cloud was shown live on TV towercam.

=== March 16 (Philippines) ===
A EFU tornado struck four villages in Tupi, South Cotabato at around 15:00 PhST. It destroyed 2 houses and partially damaged 69 others. It displaced 71 families and injured 2 people as it moved through the area. Agricultural crops were uprooted, and electrical and telephone posts were also toppled which resulted in a power outage that last for several hours. The tornado caused initial estimated damages of more than ₱2 million.

=== March 30–31 ===
EFU	EF0	EF1	EF2	EF3	EF4	EF5
0	19	6	2	0	0	0

A low pressure system tracked across the southern Great Plains on the evening of March 30. Isolated supercells developed along the dryline in western Oklahoma in the late evening hours, continuing into the overnight hours. The storms approached the Oklahoma City metro area after dark, and produced an EF1 tornado in Edmond, Oklahoma around 1:50 am CDT (0650 UTC) on March 31. The Storm Prediction Center issued a moderate risk for severe weather from Northeastern Texas to Southwestern Missouri on the morning of March 31. There were 11 tornadoes confirmed in southwest Missouri, with the strongest being an EF2 tornado near Buffalo.

== April ==
There were 189 tornadoes reported in the United States in the month of April, all of which were confirmed.

=== April 3–5 ===
EFU	EF0	EF1	EF2	EF3	EF4	EF5
0	6	16	5	0	0	0

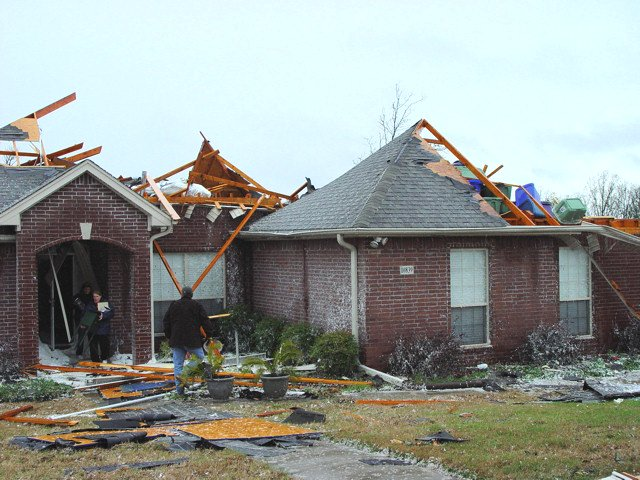
The Little Rock Metropolitan Area, including the Hidden Creek Subdivision, was particularly hard hit by severe weather on April 3, 2008

On April 3, an EF2 tornado struck the Little Rock metropolitan area. The tornado damaged areas in the central part of Little Rock and moved past the National Weather Service office in North Little Rock, where the airport also sustained damage to hangars and aircraft. There were 10 confirmed tornadoes that struck Central Arkansas on this day. More supercells developed on April 4 across the south. 21 tornadoes were reported in Alabama, Louisiana, Mississippi, South Carolina, and North Carolina. Significant damage was reported near Vicksburg and north of Jackson, Mississippi, where 20 people were injured by an EF2 tornado. An EF0 tornado was confirmed in North Carolina on April 5 before the outbreak came to an end.

=== April 8–11 ===
EFU	EF0	EF1	EF2	EF3	EF4	EF5
0	6	16	5	0	0	0

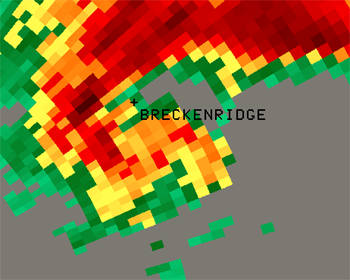
Reflectivity image of the Breckenridge, Texas tornadic supercell that prompted a tornado emergency

On April 8, four tornadoes were reported with an EF1 tornado confirmed in Allegan County, Michigan, where it damaged a horse barn and a trailer. More cells began to develop across parts of Texas on the afternoon of April 9. An intense supercell in the late afternoon developed near Breckenridge, where a tornado emergency was declared. The tornado hit the southern edge of the town, where 15 people were injured. Several other tornadoes were reported across both Texas and Oklahoma ahead of a powerful squall line, and significant wind damage from a serial derecho was reported in the overnight hours. Eight tornadoes were confirmed on April 9 and the early morning hours of April 10, including two rated EF0, four rated EF1 and two rated EF2.

Also on April 10, two tornadoes were reported in Southeastern Missouri, with both being confirmed as EF0 tornadoes. Several other tornadoes were reported during the evening across Southern Iowa, where there were reports of damage. Five tornadoes were reported across the Des Moines, Iowa coverage area, with two being rated EF0 while the other three were rated EF1.

While no tornadoes were reported across most of the areas of Arkansas and Tennessee during the afternoon and evening hours, as the forecasted major tornado outbreak did not materialize, one EF1 tornado was later confirmed in Grant and Saline Counties in Arkansas, but it was from earlier storms. One EF0 tornado in St. Joseph, Missouri also left some minor damage and one person injured.

Another round of severe weather began on the morning of April 11, with two main supercell areas – one stretching from Central Kentucky to Central Mississippi, and the other in the Central Great Lakes. One confirmed EF3 tornado caused extensive damage to some homes and buildings as well as one injury north of Lawrenceburg in Lawrence County, Tennessee before continuing into Wayne County. A high-end EF1 tornado in Warren County damaged 60 homes about 11 miles (18 km) west of to 5 miles (8.0 km) northeast of McMinnville. 10 tornadoes were reported from Alabama to Kentucky. Damaging wind gusts as high as 86 miles per hour (138 km/h) caused significant structural damage in Downtown Gadsden, Alabama, while in Hoover, parts of the roof of an apartment complex collapsed. 11 tornadoes, including five in Kentucky (two EF1 and three EF2 tornadoes), four in Alabama (all of them EF0 tornadoes) and two in Tennessee (an EF1 and an EF3 tornadoes), were later confirmed.

=== April 9 (Southwest Europe) ===
Europe's first significant tornado event of 2008 took place early on April 9 across the Iberian Peninsula. The strongest tornado, a T5 (high end F2) tornado, tracked through parts of Amiãis de Baixo east of Torres Novas in eastern Portugal. Six people were injured in that tornado and significant damage was reported among a 6-mile (10 km) long path. Furthermore, two other tornadoes struck areas in Portugal (near Póvoa e Meadas) and near El Batán in the western Extremadura region in western Spain.

=== April 23–26 ===
EFU	EF0	EF1	EF2	EF3	EF4	EF5
0	29	5	3	0	0	0

21 tornadoes were confirmed across Northern and Central Texas on April 23. A low-end EF2 tornado produced extensive damage to some homes in Crowley. On April 24, several severe storms spawned a few tornadoes in the Midwest, with most of the activity occurring in Northern Kansas. Four tornadoes were confirmed across Iowa and Wisconsin the following day with the strongest being an EF2 tornado in Muscatine County, Iowa.

=== April 28 ===
EFU	EF0	EF1	EF2	EF3	EF4	EF5
0	8	7	0	1	0	0

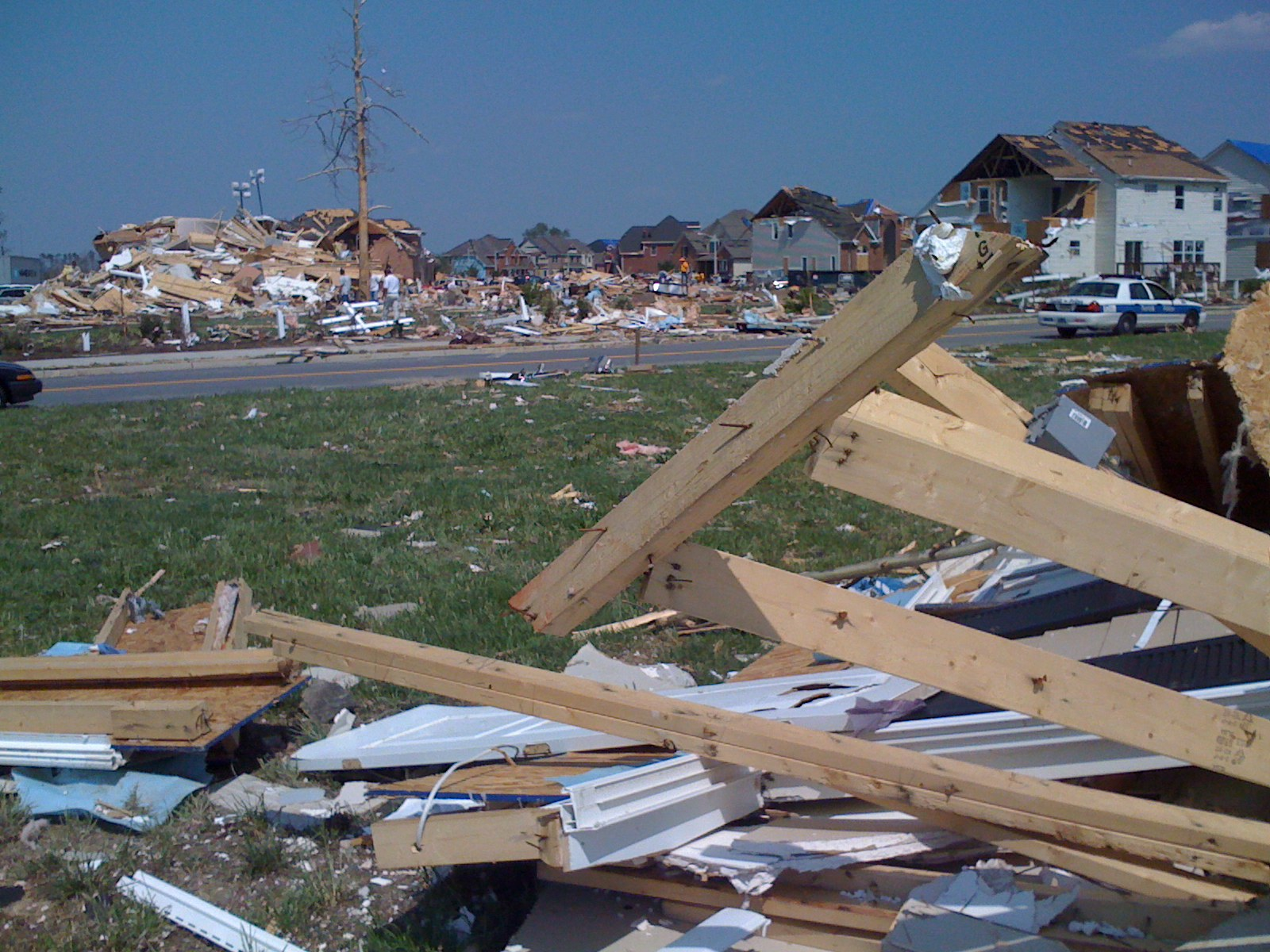
Damage from a tornado in Suffolk, Virginia

The Freedom Plaza Strip Mall in Suffolk, Virginia left in ruins after a tornado.

On April 28, 2008, a storm event across Northeastern North Carolina and Southeastern Virginia produced 15 tornadoes, including an EF3 that struck Suffolk, Virginia. The remaining, much weaker tornadoes also affected the state, specifically in the counties such as: Brunswick, Surry, Isle of Wight, and then in Mathews and Gloucester. The tornadoes in these said counties would be rated EF0 - EF1. These tornadoes were produced by discrete supercells and a QLCS. In North Carolina, 3 very weak tornadoes occurred throughout the day, affecting areas near Belhaven, NC and Mount Olive, NC. Another weak tornado impacted areas near White Plains, NC. All of these said tornadoes, in North Carolina, were rated EF0. These small tornadoes were also produced by a QLCS. The strongest tornado of the day impacted the city of Suffolk, Virginia, and left the northern parts of the city destroyed. The tornado formed along Route 58, near Lummis, at roughly 4:05 PM EDT, inflicting little to no damage to rural areas. Once the tornado crossed Lake Meade, it began doing noticeable, but minimal damage to residential areas. It then crossed the interchange of Route 58 and Godwin Boulevard and impacted the Freedom Plaza Strip Mall. It left the strip mall in ruins and tossed cars about. A large pickup truck was hurled into, and through an extension building of the Obici-Sentara Health Hospital. Just after ravaging this area, it then went onto destroy two sub-divisions of residential areas, leaving many houses flattened. After exiting the Suffolk area, it travelled through rural areas, doing minimal damage. It then impacted the small village of Driver, Virginia. Here, the Suffolk Variety Store was levelled. The twister then tracked into and near the Norfolk Area, where it then fizzled out as it crossed the Elizabeth River at around 4:20 PM EDT. In the wake of the tornado, Bob Spieldenner from V.D.E.M, stated approximately 200 people suffered injuries in Suffolk, and that nobody was killed. One of the National Weather Service employees for Wakefield, Virginia, more specifically Bryan Jackson, stated that this tornado was major.The National Weather Service in Wakefield also concluded that this tornado topped out at winds of 160 mph (257 k/mph). Suffolk city officials stated the tornado caused over $32.8 million dollars in property damage as well as losses.

This storm event in return resulted in Governor Tim Kaine issuing a State of Emergency for the areas that suffered notable impacts from tornadoes in Southern Virginia. Across the region, 5,000-18,000 Dominion Virginia Power users remained without any electricity throughout the following night. The main Sentara-Obici hospital building suffered little structural damage and was able to treat patients immediately after the tornado had passed. Sentara hospital spokesman Dale Gaulding stated approximately 60 people were injured and being actively treated, and they expected more to come. Another hospital spokesperson, Terry Tysinger, spoke for Southside Regional Medical Center and stated that one storm victim suffered minor injuries and was successfully treated. For the following days, many that were affected by the Suffolk tornado sought refuge in Kings Fork High School. One of Suffolk's previous mayors, Chris Jones, stopped by the school and volunteered, giving out necessities such as toothpaste, deodorant, and water. The National Guard arrived within hours of the event and began closing off streets in Suffolk for days to enhance the cleanup process.

In Brunswick County, property damage was reported and Sergeant Michelle Cotten of Virginia State Police stated at least two houses were destroyed, and that flooding was visible.

A study of the environment for this day was conducted approximately 6 months later, as meteorologist and National Weather Service employee, Bryan Jackson went into detail regarding how such a historic event could occur.

The casualties of this event were entirely made up of injuries, and totaled out to more than 200, with the Colonial Heights EF1 tornado and the Suffolk EF3 tornado being the only tornadoes to cause any of them. No direct fatalities were reported on this day. The total damage cost of this event was estimated to be 33 million dollars (2008 USD), most of it being made up by the Suffolk, Virginia tornado.

== May ==
There were 597 tornadoes reported in the United States in the month of May, of which 461 were confirmed.

=== May 1–3 ===
EFU	EF0	EF1	EF2	EF3	EF4	EF5
0	28	19	10	3	0	0

The Storm Prediction Center issued a Moderate Risk of severe weather for Eastern Kansas from east of Wichita to near Kansas City on May 1. It was later extended into Northeastern Oklahoma. Scattered tornadoes were reported from Iowa to Oklahoma including reports of a wedge tornado near Ralston, Oklahoma, according to KOCO-TV and KFOR-TV coverage and storm chasers. A total of 19 tornadoes were reported, although no significant damage occurred.

In the overnight hours, a strong squall line/serial derecho formed across the Central United States. Widespread tree and building damage was reported across the Kansas City metropolitan area. Winds as strong as 85 mph (136 km/h) were reported, and many power outages took place, impacting about 50,000 customers. About 200 buildings were destroyed and many others damaged.

The SPC had also issued a moderate risk for Day 2 for the Mississippi Valley from Springfield, Illinois to near Shreveport, Louisiana. It was revised further south on May 2. The SPC lists six fatalities in Arkansas from three possible tornadoes in Conway, Van Buren, and Pulaski Counties. At least 50 tornadoes were reported, most of them in Central and Southern Arkansas.

=== May 5 (Bangladesh) ===
A deadly tornado took place in the Barisal and Magura districts of Bangladesh on May 5. Two people were killed and seven others were injured as a result of a tornado that hit some corrugated structures. Straight-line winds caused numerous other fatalities in the area.

=== May 7–11 ===
EFU	EF0	EF1	EF2	EF3	EF4	EF5
0	49	41	23	5	2	0

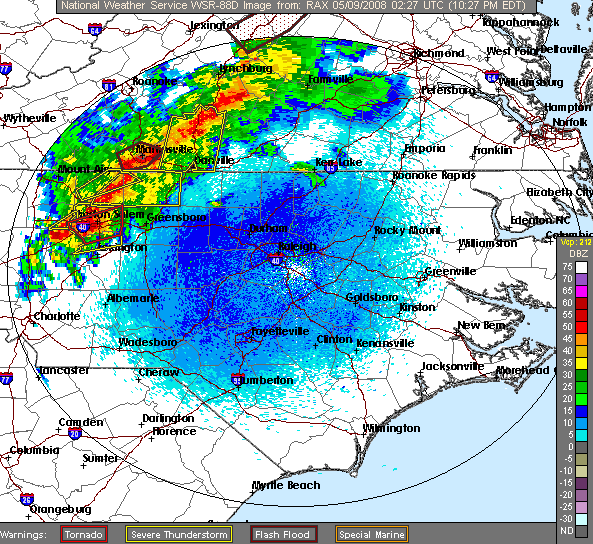
Radar scan of the tornadic thunderstorms over North Carolina during the late evening of May 8, 2008

A moderate risk was also issued for Southeastern Oklahoma and Northeastern Texas on May 7. A possible tornado in the Oklahoma City Metropolitan Area produced some damage according to KFOR-TV and KOCO-TV, including to the roof of a Sam's Club store but mostly to trees and some power lines, cutting power to 16,000 customers including in Bethany and Northern Oklahoma City. A gas line in Bethany also ruptured, causing a gas leak. One report indicated a tornado near Wiley Post Airport and was previously filmed as a wall cloud and funnel near 164th Street in South Oklahoma City. KOCO reported wind gusts of up to 124 mph (200 km/h) at the station, snapping a tree. Damage was also reported to trees near KFOR-TV's station. Near Yukon another tornado was reported causing, localized roof damage. Widespread wind damage was also reported across eastern Oklahoma during the evening hours and one person was injured near Paoli. A total of 10 tornadoes were reported including one in Casper, Wyoming. Five tornadoes, four rated EF0 with the other rated EF1, were confirmed.

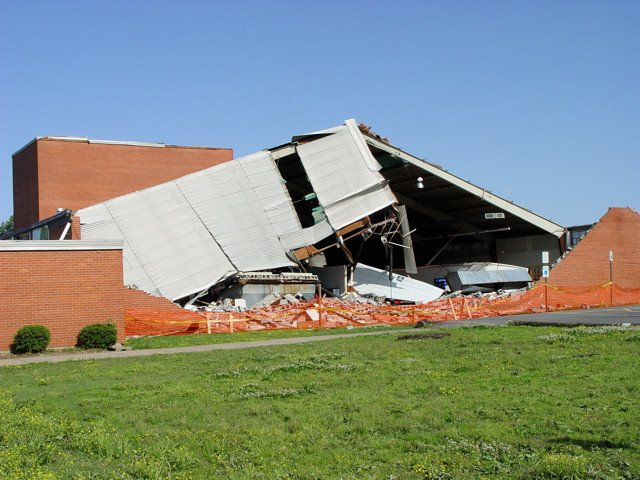
Major damage occurred across Lonoke, Prairie and Arkansas Counties on May 10, 2008

On May 8, severe weather shifted east of the Mississippi River and produced a tornado near Tupelo, Mississippi, causing some damage to buildings, including a Department of Transportation building at the Mall at Barnes Crossing. Damage was also reported near the Tupelo Regional Airport and at the Tupelo Furniture Market. Residential damage was minimal with only portions of roofs removed from several homes. A tornado near the Alabama-Tennessee state line also caused some structural damage. 21 tornadoes were reported across three different areas, including Kansas and Ohio, with at least eight being confirmed. One tornado was rated EF3 (Tupelo), three were rated EF0, three more were rated EF1 and the last was rated EF2.

More tornadoes developed that evening across North Carolina with unconfirmed tornado reports in Virginia and Maryland as well. Central North Carolina was hardest hit, with several communities sustaining severe damage. From late on the 8th to early on the 9th, one person was killed and three were injured by a high-end EF2 tornado near Greensboro. Planes at the Piedmont Triad International Airport and several buildings including warehouses and businesses were damaged. A low-end EF3 tornado struck Forsyth County with the worst damage occurring near Frye Bridge Road and Moss Creek Lane near Clemmons, an area that was also hit by an F3 tornado just over 10 years earlier, causing major damage throughout the town. Two other tornadoes, including an EF1 and an EF2 were confirmed in Southwestern Virginia.

Hot on the heels of the previous severe weather event, another severe weather event developed May 10 and 11. A moderate risk of severe weather was forecast from the Carolina Coast southward through most of Georgia. Significant tornadoes, large hail, and damaging winds occurred, killing at least 23 people.

The activity was slow to develop with only elevated hail-producing cells, but late in the afternoon, several supercells developed across eastern Oklahoma with reports of large and dangerous tornadoes. The worst tornado caused EF4 damage in Newton County, Missouri. Significant damage occurred in several communities, with at least 23 deaths reported (21 by tornadoes); 13 in Newton County, Missouri, one each in Purdy and near Carthage, Missouri, six in Picher, Oklahoma, and one in Laurens County, Georgia. More were feared dead or trapped in the rubble. Another death was reported near Carthage, Missouri due to straight-line winds.

=== May 22–27 ===
EFU	EF0	EF1	EF2	EF3	EF4	EF5
0	107	41	14	9	1	1

A storm system (separate from the Great Plains storm system listed below) produced several tornadoes in Riverside County, California on May 22. The first tornado was reported from March Air Force Base in Moreno Valley, and produced generally minor damage to structures. Another touchdown was occurred in Corona, and more funnel clouds were reported near Hemet and Lake Elsinore. Some of the damage reported included a flipped semi-trailer truck and a train derailment. In the end, four tornadoes were confirmed, with the Moreno Valley tornado being an EF2 – the strongest in the state since 1998.

Meanwhile, the Storm Prediction Center issued a moderate risk of severe weather for May 22 in the Central Plains, including a risk of strong tornadoes and destructive hail. A slight risk of severe weather was issued from May 23–26 throughout the Memorial Day weekend for various regions across the Great Plains and Midwest, including the risk for further tornadoes. The risk area was upgraded to a high risk for parts of Kansas later in the afternoon of May 22. The Storm Prediction Center stated that "a regional tornado outbreak appears likely".

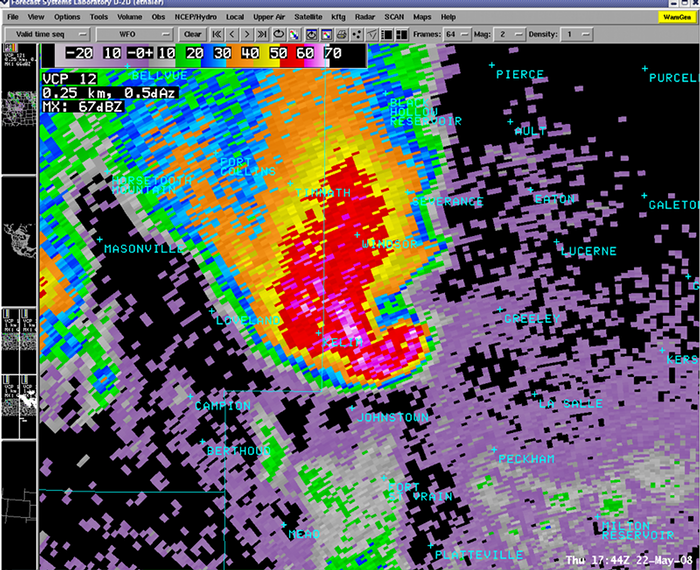
Radar image of a tornadic supercell thunderstorm producing an EF3 near Greeley, Colorado at 1744 UTC

At about 11:30 am MDT (1730 UTC) on May 22, a powerful low-end EF3 tornado touched down in Weld County, Colorado moving between the towns of Gilcrest and Milliken, about 45 miles (72 km) north of Denver Weld County officials closed US 85 at SH-60 after two semi-trailers were blown over at that location. The truck drivers were not believed to be injured. As many as 60,000 customers were without electrical power in Greeley, and a man was killed in a recreational vehicle outside of town. The tornado slammed into a business park in Windsor, reportedly flattening several buildings, and knocked a cut of railroad cars off their axles. The area was described as "total destruction" by an emergency responder. A 52-year-old man was killed at a campground near Greeley, while 13 people were treated at hospitals, and more than 100 others received medical attention for minor injuries. 596 homes were damaged, with 102 deemed unsafe to occupy An EF2 struck Laramie, Wyoming, damaging two schools, several homes, an apartment building, a Wal-Mart, and several other businesses. The Governor of Colorado, Bill Ritter, declared a state of emergency and activated the Colorado National Guard in Weld County. Many more tornadoes took place in Western Kansas and Southwestern Nebraska later in the afternoon and evening, but most were in open country and no fatalities were reported. A few tornadoes, including an EF2, touched down as far west as Southern California that evening as well.

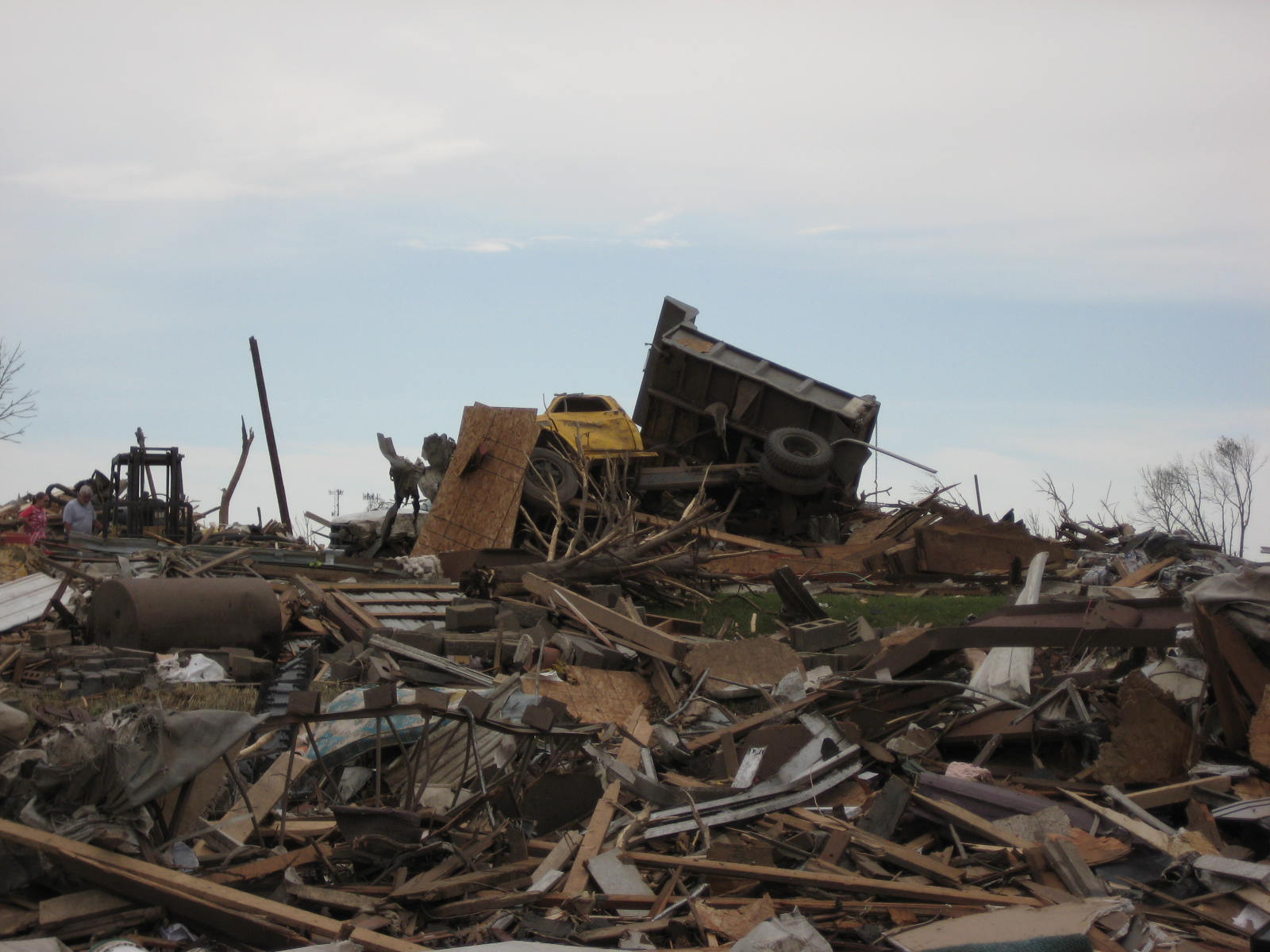
Parkersburg, Iowa was particularly hard hit by a devastating EF5 tornado on May 25, 2008

On May 23, the Storm Prediction Center issued a moderate risk of severe storms for most of the same areas affected by the previous day's tornadoes, including Central Kansas, Southwestern Nebraska, Far Northeastern Colorado and Far Southeastern Wyoming. Strong tornadoes and damaging hail were again expected throughout the region. Multiple significant tornadoes ripped through the Central Plains that evening, particularly in Western and Central Kansas. Numerous tornadoes touched down in Gove, Sheridan, Ness, Rooks and Ellis Counties, many of which were very large wedges. Two people were injured in Quinter by a large and violent EF4 wedge tornado that impacted multiple farmsteads while a nighttime EF3 twister near Cairo picked up a car off of a road and threw it hundreds of yards into a field, killing the couple inside. The town of Ellis was struck by two consecutive EF1 tornadoes that caused heavy roof damage, broke windows, severely damaged small structures, left the town without power, and caused few injuries. A 1.8 mile wide EF3 tornado was also documented near Mullinville.

On May 24, several tornadoes occurred in Oklahoma and Kansas. An EF1 tornado destroyed three barns at a hog farm near Lacey in Kingfisher County, Oklahoma, about 75 miles northwest of Oklahoma City. EF2 tornadoes from the same supercell affected other rural areas. No injuries were reported at the farm or elsewhere in the state. In Garfield County, a trailer was blown onto SH-74 near Covington and power lines were downed.

On May 25, a violent EF5 wedge tornado caused extreme damage in Parkersburg and New Hartford, Iowa. Residents in Parkersburg were evacuated because of a gas leak. At least four major businesses, a high school, and more than 400 homes were damaged with 222 of them being destroyed. 21 commercial buildings, including City Hall, were also destroyed in Parkersburg. In New Hartford, the tornado a cemetery as well as subdivision on the north side of town, where multiple homes were obliterated and swept away. Nine people were killed.

Overall, this outbreak sequence resulted in 13 fatalities.

=== May 28–31 ===
EFU	EF0	EF1	EF2	EF3	EF4	EF5
0	36	21	7	2	0	0

A major severe weather outbreak was again expected over the Midwest, stretching eastward into the Great Lakes region on May 29. The Storm Prediction Center issued a high risk of severe weather for portions of Eastern Nebraska, Western Iowa, and Extreme Southeast South Dakota with a moderate risk stretching from North-Central Kansas to Southwestern Minnesota. Later during the day, a moderate risk was issued for May 30 from Northeastern Missouri to Northern Indiana.

Tornadoes struck Central Nebraska, causing damage to businesses and homes. Multiple tornadoes, including two EF2 twisters, occurred in and around Kearney, where 90 rail cars were blown off the tracks outside the city limits. The tornadoes downed numerous trees and power lines in Kearney, and caused considerable damage at the University of Nebraska at Kearney campus, the local airport, and the county fairgrounds. A large multiple-vortex EF3 tornado caused major damage in Jewell in North-Central Kansas, but no injuries were reported. Nebraska Governor Dave Heineman declared a state of emergency, which allowed access to state and federal resources for storm cleanup. On May 30, 18 people were injured as an EF2 tornado tore through residential areas of Eastern Indianapolis. A line of storms also struck Illinois, spawning one EF1 tornado that damaged four homes, several outbuildings, and a grain bin near Waverly and Auburn.

On May 31, a moderate risk of severe weather was issued for parts of the Mid-Atlantic and Northeastern United States. Activity was mostly limited to hail and damaging wind events, although a few tornadoes were reported.

== June ==
There were 394 tornadoes reported in the United States in the month of June, of which 294 were confirmed.

=== June 3–11 ===
EFU	EF0	EF1	EF2	EF3	EF4	EF5
0	109	63	14	5	1	0

More severe weather took place in the Central United States in the first week of June. A moderate risk was issued for June 3 across the Ohio Valley, with both significant tornadoes and a derecho event possible. In Indiana, an EF3 tornado ripped through Moscow at about 10:30 pm EDT (0330 UTC). 10 people were injured in Moscow, with one victim dying two months later after getting impaled in the upper chest by a 3-inch (7.6 cm) diameter tree limb. 50 buildings were damaged, along with military and civilian vehicles in Camp Atterbury, with two soldiers suffering minor injuries. A covered bridge was also destroyed. There were 18 reported tornadoes on June 3. The threat continued on June 4 with another moderate risk in the Mid-Atlantic States, where a derecho event developed in the Baltimore-Washington metropolitan area that afternoon, knocking out power to 200,000 customers. In Annandale, Virginia, a woman was killed when a tree fell on top of her vehicle. The death was caused by straight-line winds. An EF0 tornado also struck Chesapeake Beach, Maryland, injuring five people and damaging 14 homes and one business.

As that system passed, another unseasonably strong low pressure area tracked across the Great Plains. The Storm Prediction Center anticipated a tornado outbreak beginning June 4 through 6, including possibility of "strong...long-tracked tornadoes". A moderate risk of severe storms was issued for both June 4 and 5th. In Nebraska, farm buildings were damaged or destroyed by a tornado that hit Ulysses. Residents of Ceresco were evacuated from their homes because of downed power lines and trees caused by two EF1 tornadoes that hit the area. Tornadoes also touched down in Southern Iowa, causing isolated damage in rural areas. A tornado seriously damaged one house near Emerson. On June 4, 40 tornadoes were reported (not including those related to the eastern systems).

In the 1300 UTC outlook on June 5, the Storm Prediction Center issued a large high risk area for much of the Great Plains and Upper Midwest, with the potential for many strong to violent tornadoes and/or a large derecho event. Forecasters had warned of a potentially historic outbreak, as computer forecasting models for June 5 resembled those on June 8, 1974, when 39 tornadoes raked the Southern Plains and killed 22 people. Wichita State University canceled evening classes because of the weather predictions. In Craig, Missouri, three semi-trailer trucks were blown over by a tornado on Interstate 29. One of the drivers needed to be extricated. 35 tornadoes were reported, but most were in sparsely populated areas. Winds as strong as 92 miles per hour (148 km/h) were also reported. While the threat was much lower on June 6, one tornado raked a 0.5-mile (0.80 km) wide path of destruction in Northwestern Minnesota, causing widespread damage in Park Rapids. A house overlooking Pickerel Lake near Emmaville was destroyed. A turkey farm near Blueberry Lake was destroyed and a small housing development suffered minor damage.

On June 7, a moderate risk was issued for parts of Southern Wisconsin, Northwestern Illinois and Iowa. One supercell produced eight tornadoes as it tracked from Livingston County to Cook County, Illinois, including four EF2 tornadoes in Will County, causing significant damage to some Southern Chicago suburbs near the Indiana state line. Hardest hit were Chicago Heights, Wilmington, University Park and Richton Park. Six injuries were reported with one person injured on Interstate 57. A tornado was also spotted in Lake County north of Chicago during the early evening hours. In Wisconsin, six people suffered minor injuries after a tornado ripped through Columbia County.

On June 8, two tornadoes touched down in Millard, Nebraska at about 2:15 am CDT (0715 UTC) before merging into one. The EF1 and EF2 tornadoes caused damage to about 100 homes and businesses. The Heartland Center for Reproductive Medicine had its lobby blown off, and a Carquest store also sustained major damage. In Florida, a tornado struck North Fort Myers, causing minor damage to 44 homes, moderate damage to 12 homes, and destroying one home. One person suffered minor injuries. In Michigan, three people were killed by non-tornadic winds.

A severe weather event developed on June 11 across the Great Plains. A moderate risk of severe weather was issued for the region. Four people were killed and 48 people were injured when a tornado struck the Little Sioux Scout Ranch in Little Sioux, Iowa. In Kansas, one person was killed in Chapman when an EF3 tornado damaged 80 percent of the town. The tornado destroyed 69 homes in Chapman. Another person was killed in the small town of Soldier, where a tornado damaged 32 homes. In Manhattan, an EF4 tornado caused significant damage to southwest side of town, while also striking parts of Kansas State University, where Cardwell Hall, Ward Hall, Burt Hall and the engineering complex suffered damage and the Wind Erosion Laboratory was destroyed. The Sigma Alpha Epsilon fraternity house was also damaged. A tornado also destroyed nine homes and a cabinet manufacturing company in Salina.

=== June 9 (Western Australia) ===
On June 9, a tornado swept through the Southern Perth suburb of Rockingham. The tornado had winds of 93 miles per hour (150 km/h). The State Emergency Service responded to more than 200 calls for help and the tornado damaged more than 130 homes.

=== June 19 ===
EFU	EF0	EF1	EF2	EF3	EF4	EF5
0	0	2	0	0	0	0

On June 19, an EF1 tornado hit Eastern Springfield, Missouri at around 3:30 pm CDT (2030 UTC). The tornado uprooted trees and damaged buildings, including causing a roof to collapse at a furniture store. It was the second tornado to hit the city in 2008; the first was an EF1 that hit the downtown area on January 8. An EF1 tornado also hit Chatham County, Georgia, damaging a fire station and knocking a steeple off a church.

=== June 20 (China) ===
A short-lived, intense tornado struck Lingbi County, in the Chinese province of Anhui, causing one fatality and destroying 650 homes in just five minutes. 45 people were injured by the tornado, which caused $2.8 million (18.5 million yuan) in losses. More than 20,000 people were affected by the tornado and 950 were relocated. The tornado was also caught on film.

== July ==
There were 120 tornadoes reported in the United States in the month of July, of which 94 were confirmed.

=== July 6–11 (Europe) ===
The largest severe weather outbreak in Europe in 2008 took place. At least 20 tornadoes were reported across a large section of the continent. At least one person was killed and one other was injured in northwestern Russia, with the fatality taking place in Udmurtiya where a house was destroyed. The strongest tornado was rated as at least F2. Other tornadoes were reported in Germany, Italy, Poland, Croatia, Latvia, the Netherlands and Denmark.

=== July 7–11 (North America) ===
After a lull in activity, several small tornado events took place in the second week of July, mostly in the Northern Plains region. On July 7, several tornadoes were reported near the Manitoba/North Dakota border causing damage to trees, roofs, and boats. Among the areas hit were Bottineau, Rolette and Towner Counties in North Dakota as well as Lake Metigoshe and Turtle Mountain Provincial Park in Manitoba. An EF3 tornado destroyed 12 homes and damaged 18 others in Rolla before destroying eight more homes and damaging 47 others in Belcourt. An EF1 tornado also touched down in Green Lake County, Wisconsin. On July 8, a barn roof was removed by an EF0 tornado that hit Whitley County, Indiana. An EF1 tornado ripped off part of a warehouse roof in Petersburg, Virginia on July 9.

On July 10, two EF0 tornadoes accompanied by strong downburst winds caused damage to homes, farms and crops in Southeast Minnesota. An EF3 tornado hit Willmar, Minnesota on July 11, injuring two people while destroying three homes and damaging eight other homes, three turkey barns, and two businesses. The events on both July 10 and July 11 occurred as two powerful lines of storms including a bow echo crossed the Interstate 94 corridor from the North Dakota/Minnesota border to the Chicago area, producing widespread damaging winds.

=== July 13 (Slovenia) ===
A strong, but short-lived tornado ripped through the community of Gozd in Slovenia. The tornado, was rated a T6 (F3), and caused no injuries, but it did do extensive damage as one brick home had its second floor blown away and several others were damaged.

=== July 21–24 (North America) ===
On July 21, An EF1 tornado damaged two homes and several outbuildings in Edgar County, Illinois. The tornado also destroyed a barn and ripped out corn stalks. An EF0 tornado touched down in Moraine State Park in Butler County, Pennsylvania on July 22; minor damage was reported. On July 23, an EF1 tornado hit Warren, Rhode Island and Swansea, Massachusetts, with the majority of damage caused to trees. In Canada, an EF0 tornado was also confirmed near Welland, Ontario causing damage at a construction site on July 22 at around 5:30 pm

An intense line of storms moved through much of New England during the day on July 24. The area hardest hit was Central New Hampshire, particularly around the Epsom–Deerfield area, where an EF2 tornado killed one person, injured 2 others, caused $840,000 in damage, destroyed six homes, and damaged 200 others. Nine towns suffered heavy damage and six towns suffered minor damage in New Hampshire. A dozen people were injured according to New Hampshire Governor John Lynch. It was the first killer tornado in New England since 1995 and the first killer tornado in New Hampshire since 1946. This tornado became the longest tracked tornado in New England history.

=== July 22–24 (Hurricane Dolly) ===
EFU	EF0	EF1	EF2	EF3	EF4	EF5
0	5	0	0	0	0	0

The outer bands of Hurricane Dolly moved ashore in Deep South Texas beginning on July 22 well ahead of landfall. Several tornadoes were reported across the region as a result. The strongest of the tornadoes toppled over a roof and uprooted trees in Bayview. On July 24, an EF0 tornado ripped off roofs from commercial buildings and damaged numerous homes just south of Downtown San Antonio.

=== July 26 (Ontario) ===
A tornado narrowly missed some lakefront properties just north of Balsam Lake near Coboconk, Ontario, destroying a tall stand of forest.

== August ==
There were 145 tornadoes reported in the United States in the month of August, of which 101 were confirmed.

=== August 3 (Europe) ===
FU	F0	F1	F2	F3	F4	F5
0	5	4	3	0	1	0

A violent tornado hit the Northern-French towns of Hautmont and Boussieres-sur-Sambre in the late hours of the day, killing three people and injuring 13 others. Many homes were severely damaged, tearing the roof off some and collapsing or even blowing down others. Cars were reportedly flung through the air, and the tornado was rated T8 (F4) according to the European Severe Storms Laboratory.

=== August 4 (Philippines) ===
A tornado overturned a school bus that was heading north to Palauig, Zambales where it killed a 15-year-old student and injuring 14 others.

=== August 4–5 ===
A major progressive derecho tracked across Northern Illinois and Northwest Indiana, particularly the Chicago metropolitan area, late on August 4 into the early hours of August 5. Three tornadoes were confirmed in the region, with the strongest tornado hitting Griffith, Indiana, which was an EF2. Tornado sirens went off in downtown Chicago and fans attending a Major League Baseball game between the Chicago Cubs and Houston Astros were evacuated from the stands to the stadium's concourse. Structural damage was reported, both from the tornadoes and from straight-line winds. Winds as high as 97 miles per hour (156 km/h) were also reported. As the storms moved east onto the eastern shore of Lake Michigan, widespread damage was reported in Lake, Porter, and LaPorte Counties in Indiana. A man driving in Michigan City was killed when high winds knocked a tree onto his car. Later on, people in Chicago said that the "August 4, 2008 Derecho" was the worst derecho in history to hit the city of Chicago. A Chicago Cubs game against the Houston Astros was delayed by 2 hours and 45 minutes as the storm passed.

=== August 14 ===
Severe thunderstorms struck Miami–Dade and Broward in South Florida on August 14, where an EF1 tornado caused damage to five apartment complexes in Hialeah. Police in Hialeah also reported that two cars were flipped over by high winds.

=== August 15 (Poland) ===
IFU	IF0	IF0.5	IF1	IF1.5	IF2	IF2.5	IF3	IF4	IF5
1	1	0	0	0	0	0	3	0	0

A extremely potent atmosphere on the 15th produced 3 confirmed powerful tornadoes including a multi-vortex 1km wide IF3 tornado hit near Balcarzowice and Kopanina in Poland. More than 100 homes were damaged or destroyed. Many cars and trucks were flipped over on A4 highway by strong winds. Another long-track IF3 tornado killed two people and injured 40 others. A bus carrying a Polish folk group was directly hit by a tornado and flipped over on National Road Number 1. Another three tornadoes were reported so far.

=== August 18–27 (Tropical Storm Fay) ===
EFU	EF0	EF1	EF2	EF3	EF4	EF5
0	32	15	3	0	0	0

The largest tropical-related tornado outbreak since 2005 began with at least eight tornadoes being reported across Florida as a result of Tropical Storm Fay making landfall. The most significant damage was reported in Wellington, Florida where minor structural damage was reported and many doors and windows were blown out by an EF2 tornado. Damage was also reported near Barefoot Bay from a possible tornado that resulted in three structures being uninhabitable. Tree damage was also reported in several communities.

Another round of tornadoes related to Fay took place on August 22 and 23. 11 more tornadoes were reported across Florida into Southern Georgia.

More tornadoes took place on August 25 through 27 across Florida, Alabama, Georgia and the Carolinas, although most were weak and short lived.

=== August 31–September 4 (Hurricane Gustav) ===
A tornado outbreak occurred as a result of Hurricane Gustav, which made landfall early on September 1 in Southern Louisiana. Most of the tornadoes were weak, although a few were damaging. The most severe damage in the first wave of tornadoes was in Jefferson Parish, Louisiana (which had already been hit by Gustav's winds and rain), where a tornado late on the afternoon of September 2 destroyed numerous houses, an apartment complex and a restaurant, and damaged many other buildings. More tornadoes were reported on September 2 and the early morning hours of September 3. In Evangeline Parish, Louisiana near Mamou, a tornado during the early hours of September 3 damaged several houses and killed two people as well as injuring several others. In total, over the four days, 68 tornadoes were reported and 50 were confirmed.

== September ==
There were 133 tornadoes reported in the United States in the month of September, of which 111 were confirmed.

=== September 6 (Tropical Storm Hanna) ===
An EF1 tornado was confirmed by the National Weather Service to have touched down in Allentown, Pennsylvania, before 3 pm as a result of Tropical Storm Hanna. Some houses, many trees, and a portion of Louis E. Dieruff High School were damaged due to the very brief tornado. No injuries were reported.

=== September 12–14 (Hurricane Ike) ===
As Hurricane Ike approached the Upper Texas Coast, the outer bands spawned several tornadoes in Louisiana. The most notable tornado damaged at least 15 houses in the community of Mamou, not far from where a tornado killed two during Gustav.

At the same time, a cold front tracked across parts of the Midwest. Several tornadoes were reported in the Kansas City metropolitan area eastward into Central Missouri with structural damage reported. At least three tornadoes were confirmed in Sedalia, Missouri, De Soto, Kansas and Douglas County, Kansas.

On September 13, as the same two systems began to combine into one, two separate tornado zones took shape – one to the east of Ike's track from Louisiana to Missouri, and another focused in Southern Michigan. An EF2 tornado struck Plymouth Township, Michigan, damaging an apartment complex, flipping over cars, and knocking out power to several hundred residents. In Arkansas, six tornadoes – all rated EF1 – were confirmed.

== October ==
There were 28 tornadoes reported in the United States in the month of October, of which 21 were confirmed.

=== October 1 (Europe) ===
Four tornadoes were reported across northern Germany and the Netherlands, one of which may have been a gustnado. The worst tornado, which was rated T4 (F2), snapped or uprooted hundreds of trees near Marienthal, Brandenburg, Germany.

=== October 8 ===
Several tornadoes were reported across the Deep South as a small system moved through. The most significant damage was in Enterprise, Alabama, which was previously devastated by a violent tornado on March 1, 2007. The civic centre was heavily damaged and several houses and businesses were also damaged by an EF1 tornado there. Other tornadoes were reported in several other communities in the Florida Panhandle and Southern Alabama, although no injuries were reported. Altogether, 12 tornadoes were confirmed.

== November ==
There were 20 tornadoes reported in the United States in the month of November, of which 15 were confirmed.

=== November 15 ===
EFU	EF0	EF1	EF2	EF3	EF4	EF5
0	3	2	2	1	0	0

On November 15, a brief but deadly tornado outbreak began shortly after midnight (local time) on November 15. Most of the eight tornadoes that touched down were produced by two supercell thunderstorms over North Carolina. At 12:25 a.m. EST, the National Weather Service issued a tornado watch for most of eastern North Carolina as the risk of tornadoes increased. Not long after, the first tornado of the outbreak, an EF2, touched down in South Carolina. Almost an hour later, the second tornado touched down in Robeson County, North Carolina. Three other minor tornadoes, two EF0 and an EF1, touched down over the next two hours. Around 3:10 a.m. EST, the first of two killer tornadoes touched down near Kenly, North Carolina. The EF2 tornado destroyed a few homes and damaged several others. Roughly 20 minutes later, an EF3 tornado touched down in Wilson County. This tornado killed one person and injured a few others after destroying several homes The final tornado of the outbreak, and EF1, touched down near US 64 around 4:30 a.m. EST and dissipated around 4:36 a.m. EST, just 3 hours and 46 minutes after the outbreak started. Total damages from the outbreak amounted to $2.5 million, about half of which was a result of the EF3 tornado.

The estimated cost to clean up debris from the two killer tornadoes was estimated at $500,000. The governor of Wilson County requested that the areas struck by the EF3 tornado and the EF2 prior as disaster areas to allow federal assistance. A fund was set up for the 11-year-old boy, Joshua Wiggens, who was killed by the Elm City tornado. By November 17, the Red Cross funds were depleted funds needed to keep the organization out of debt were $38 million below what was required. About $20,000 was spent in the charity effort in Kenly and the governor of Wilson County urged residents who were no affected by the storm to send donations to the Red Cross. The lack of funding for the Red Cross prompted the governor to allow up to $28,000 in the state's emergency funds to be used for assistance by the Red Cross. On November 21, low-interest loans were approved for residents in the affected counties. Homeowners in Johnston, Franklin, Harnett, Nash, Sampson, Wake, Wayne and Wilson counties were able to apply for loans up to $200,000 to repair storm damage and businesses were allowed to apply for loans up to $2 million.

== December ==
There were 50 tornadoes reported in the United States in the month of December, of which 46 were confirmed.

=== December 9–11 ===
In the morning hours of December 9, tornado watches were issued for much of the South-Central United States. The Storm Prediction Center issued a moderate risk of severe thunderstorms for parts of Louisiana and Mississippi, including a risk of strong tornadoes. That morning, two tornadoes touched down near Alexandria, Louisiana, causing some damage. Late that afternoon, an EF2 tornado moved into Yazoo City, Mississippi, where a tornado emergency was declared. A storm chaser reported that homes, outbuildings, and businesses were damaged in Yazoo City. The tornado risk continued into the Southeastern United States in the early morning hours of December 10. A few isolated tornadoes were also reported along the Southeast coast on December 11.

There were a total of 33 tornadoes confirmed and seven people were injured by the tornadoes.

=== December 27 ===
The final severe weather event of 2008 developed early on December 27 across parts of the Midwest. That morning, a moderate risk of severe weather was issued for parts of the region, and tornadoes and wind damage occurred. At least three tornadoes were reported, with the most serious damage taking place near Liberty, Illinois, where roofs were torn off houses. The strongest tornadoes were rated high-end EF1, and 10 tornadoes were confirmed.

== See also ==
- Weather of 2008
- Tornado
  - Tornadoes by year
  - Tornado records
  - Tornado climatology
  - Tornado myths
- List of tornado outbreaks
  - List of F5 and EF5 tornadoes
  - List of F4 and EF4 tornadoes
  - List of North American tornadoes and tornado outbreaks
  - List of 21st-century Canadian tornadoes and tornado outbreaks
  - List of European tornadoes and tornado outbreaks
  - List of tornadoes and tornado outbreaks in Asia
  - List of Southern Hemisphere tornadoes and tornado outbreaks
  - List of tornadoes striking downtown areas
  - List of tornadoes with confirmed satellite tornadoes
- Tornado intensity
  - Fujita scale
  - Enhanced Fujita scale
  - International Fujita scale
  - TORRO scale
