= Voda, Kansas =

Place in Trego County, Kansas, US

- Unincorporated community
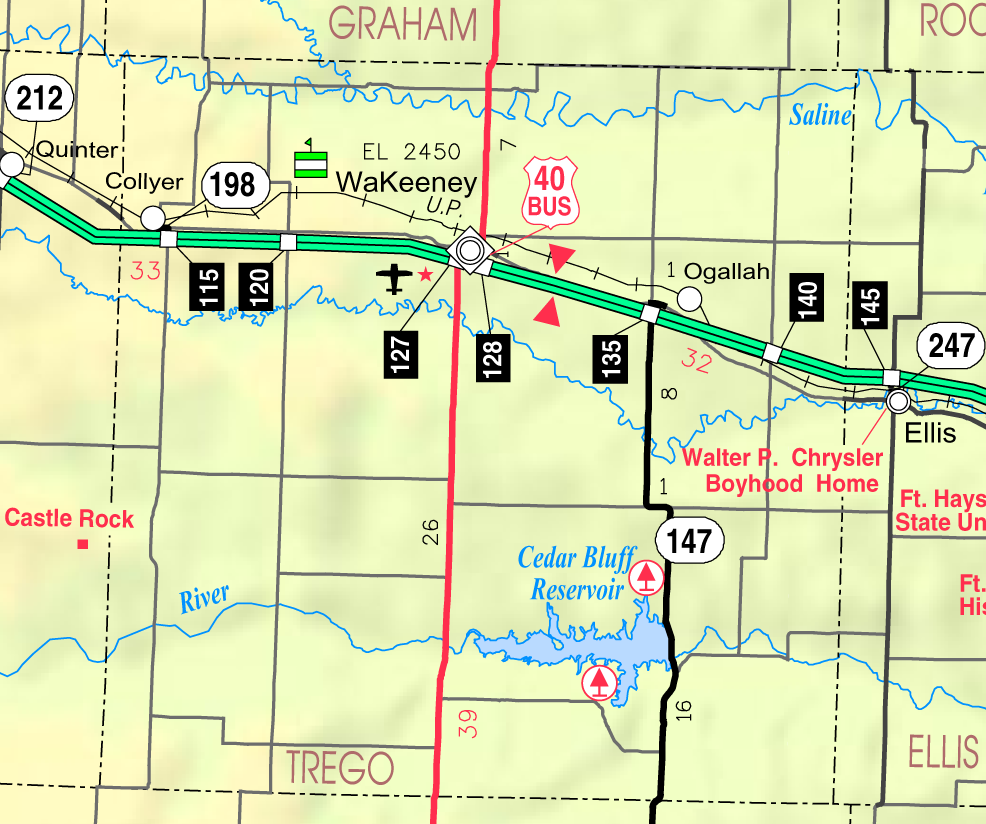
- KDOT map of Trego County (legend)

- Location within Kansas Location within the United States
- Coordinates: 39°2′57″N 100°1′11″W
- Country: United States
- State: Kansas
- County: Trego
- Elevation: 2,549 ft (777 m)
- Time zone: UTC-6 (CST)
  - Summer (DST): UTC-5 (CDT)
- Area code: 785
- FIPS code: 20-74125
- GNIS ID: 471360

Voda is an unincorporated community in Trego County, Kansas, United States. It is located approximately seven miles west of WaKeeney.

== History ==
A post office in Voda opened in 1904, closed in 1907, reopened in 1912, and closed permanently in 1913.
