= Soldier, Kansas =

City in Jackson County, Kansas

- City
- Location within Jackson County and Kansas

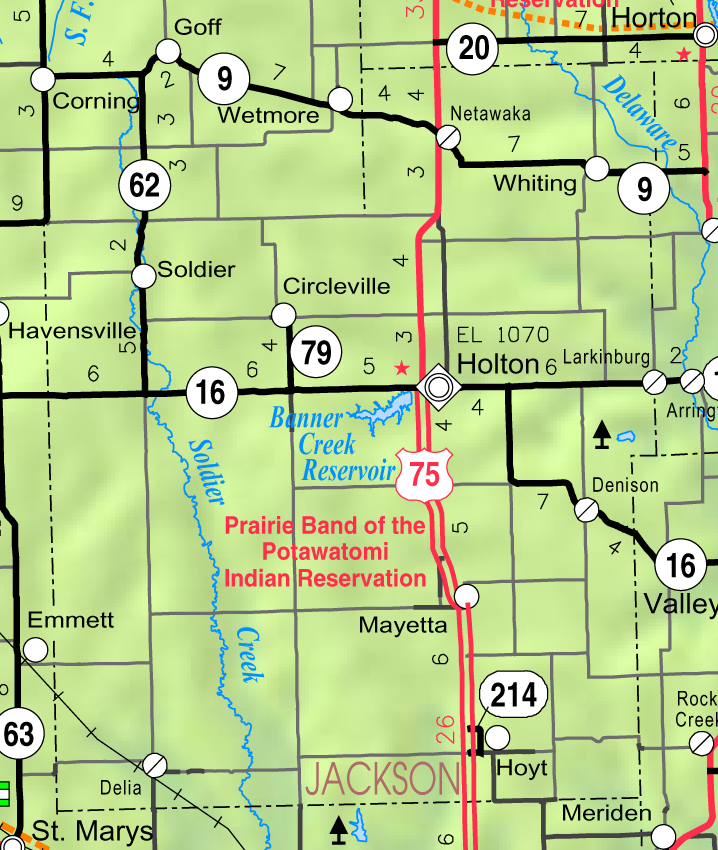
- KDOT map of Jackson County (legend)
- Coordinates: 39°32′14″N 95°57′56″W
- Country: United States
- State: Kansas
- County: Jackson
- Founded: 1877
- Incorporated: 1896
- Named for: Soldier Creek

Area
  - Total: 0.15 sq mi (0.38 km^{2})
  - Land: 0.15 sq mi (0.38 km^{2})
  - Water: 0 sq mi (0.00 km^{2})
- Elevation: 1,227 ft (374 m)

Population (2020)
  - Total: 102
  - Density: 700/sq mi (270/km^{2})
- Time zone: UTC-6 (CST)
  - Summer (DST): UTC-5 (CDT)
- ZIP Code: 66540
- Area code: 785
- FIPS code: 20-66175
- GNIS ID: 2395907

Soldier is a city in Jackson County, Kansas, United States. As of the 2020 census, the population of the city was 102.

== History ==
The first settlement was made at Soldier in 1877, and the town was laid out in the same year. Soldier took its name from Soldier Creek. The city was incorporated in 1896.

A tornado in 1883 destroyed 18 buildings and killed four people. Soldier was affected by the June 2008 tornado outbreak sequence: a man was found dead outside the city on the morning of June 11, 2008, killed by a tornado estimated at 1/2 mile (0.80 km) wide.

== Geography ==
According to the United States Census Bureau, the city has a total area of 0.15 square miles (0.39 km^{2}), all of it land.

=== Climate ===
The climate in this area is characterized by relatively high temperatures and evenly distributed precipitation throughout the year. According to the Köppen climate classification system, Soldier has a humid subtropical climate, abbreviated "Cfa" on climate maps.

== Demographics ==
Historical population
Census	Pop.	Note	%±
1880	98		—
1890	193		96.9%
1900	302		56.5%
1910	358		18.5%
1920	346		−3.4%
1930	274		−20.8%
1940	247		−9.9%
1950	193		−21.9%
1960	171		−11.4%
1970	173		1.2%
1980	165		−4.6%
1990	135		−18.2%
2000	122		−9.6%
2010	136		11.5%
2020	102		−25.0%
U.S. Decennial Census

Soldier is part of the Topeka, Kansas Metropolitan Statistical Area.

=== 2010 census ===
As of the census of 2010, there were 136 people, 48 households, and 33 families living in the city. The population density was 906.7 inhabitants per square mile (350.1/km^{2}). There were 56 housing units at an average density of 373.3 per square mile (144.1/km^{2}). The racial makeup of the city was 93.4% White, 3.7% Native American, 0.7% from other races, and 2.2% from two or more races. Hispanic or Latino of any race were 2.2% of the population.

There were 48 households, of which 41.7% had children under the age of 18 living with them, 52.1% were married couples living together, 10.4% had a female householder with no husband present, 6.3% had a male householder with no wife present, and 31.3% were non-families. 29.2% of all households were made up of individuals, and 14.6% had someone living alone who was 65 years of age or older. The average household size was 2.83 and the average family size was 3.52.

The median age in the city was 33.5 years. 39% of residents were under the age of 18; 4.3% were between the ages of 18 and 24; 22.1% were from 25 to 44; 21.3% were from 45 to 64; and 13.2% were 65 years of age or older. The gender makeup of the city was 55.1% male and 44.9% female.

=== 2000 census ===
As of the census of 2000, there were 122 people, 45 households, and 31 families living in the city. The population density was 800.6 inhabitants per square mile (309.1/km^{2}). There were 58 housing units at an average density of 380.6 per square mile (147.0/km^{2}). The racial makeup of the city was 81.15% White, 15.57% Native American, and 3.28% from two or more races. Hispanic or Latino of any race were 6.56% of the population.

There were 45 households, out of which 37.8% had children under the age of 18 living with them, 42.2% were married couples living together, 17.8% had a female householder with no husband present, and 31.1% were non-families. 31.1% of all households were made up of individuals, and 15.6% had someone living alone who was 65 years of age or older. The average household size was 2.71 and the average family size was 3.35.

In the city, the population was spread out, with 32.0% under the age of 18, 10.7% from 18 to 24, 21.3% from 25 to 44, 18.9% from 45 to 64, and 17.2% who were 65 years of age or older. The median age was 30 years. For every 100 females, there were 93.7 males. For every 100 females age 18 and over, there were 93.0 males.

The median income for a household in the city was $18,750, and the median income for a family was $46,000. Males had a median income of $25,417 versus $23,750 for females. The per capita income for the city was $14,768. There were 11.5% of families and 21.2% of the population living below the poverty line, including 23.1% of under eighteens and 42.9% of those over 64.

=== Religion ===
One church is located in Soldier: Soldier Christian Church

== Economy ==
Beside its post office, only one business is located in the city: the Soldier Grill, a restaurant. Another business, the Red Rock Ranch, lies 1.5 miles (2.4 km) outside of the city limits.

== Education ==
The community is served by Jackson Heights USD 335 public school district.

Soldier High School won the Kansas State High School boys class BB Indoor Track & Field championship in 1964.
