= Pickerel Lake (Hubbard County, Minnesota) =

Lake in the state of Minnesota, United States

- Location within Minnesota
- Location: Hubbard County, Minnesota
- Coordinates: 47°2′19″N 94°59′44″W
- Type: lake

Pickerel Lake is a lake in Hubbard County, in the U.S. state of Minnesota.

Pickerel Lake was named for its stock of the pickerel fish.

== See also ==
- List of lakes in Minnesota
