= List of tornadoes in the outbreak of May 22–27, 2008 =

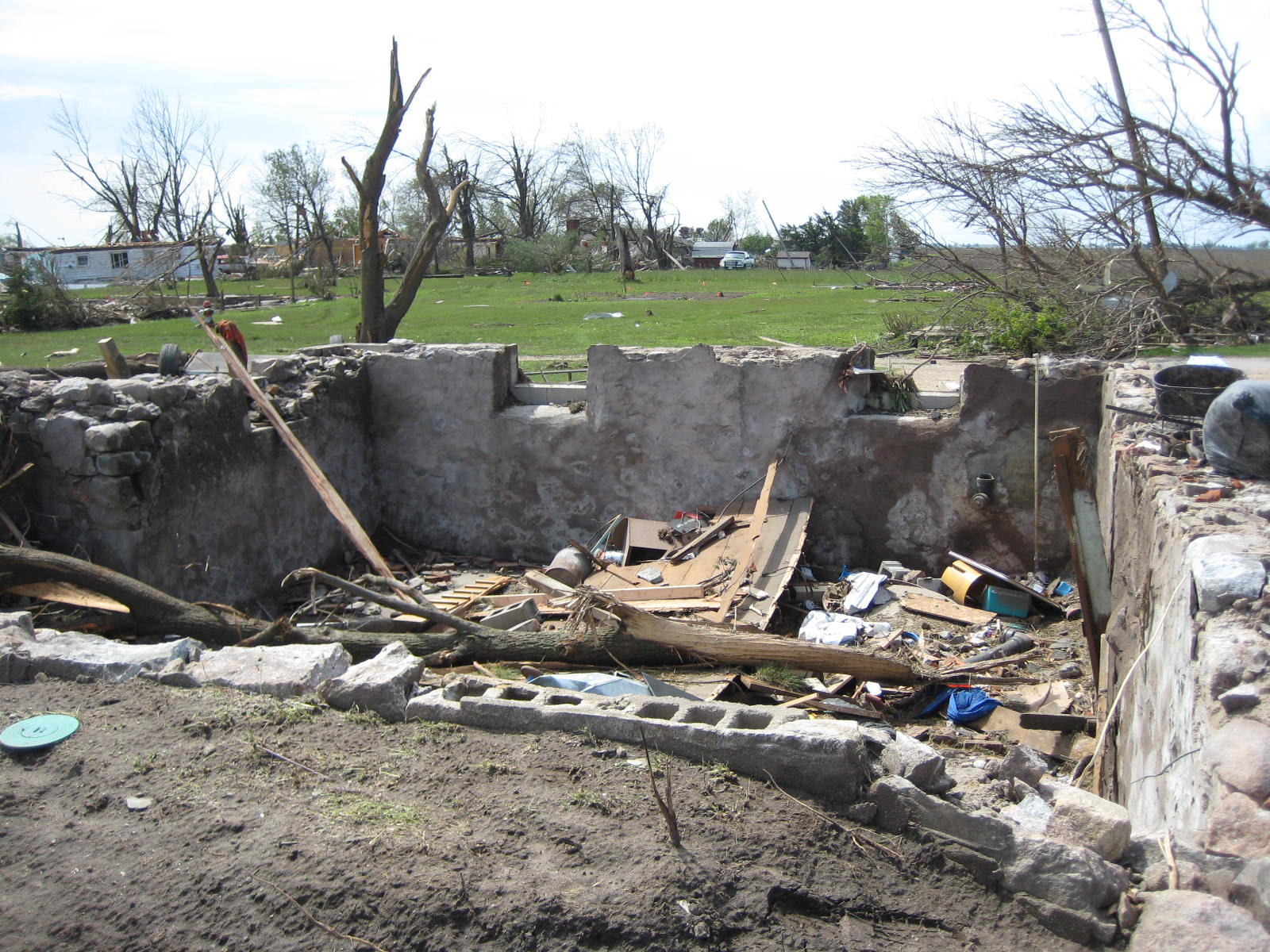
House reduced to its basement by an EF5 tornado in Parkersburg, Iowa.

The tornado outbreak of May 22–27, 2008 affected much of the central United States and parts of Canada. A total of 173 tornadoes touched down as a result of the outbreak. Several large and destructive tornadoes occurred, including in Windsor, Colorado, Quinter, Kansas, Hugo, Minnesota and Parkersburg, Iowa. The Parkersburg tornado was rated an EF5 on the Enhanced Fujita scale with winds of 205 mph. Nine people were killed in Iowa, two in Kansas and one in each Minnesota and Colorado.

== Confirmed tornadoes ==
Confirmed tornadoes by Enhanced Fujita rating
EFU	EF0	EF1	EF2	EF3	EF4	EF5	Total
0	107	41	14	9	1	1	173

- Note: Three tornadoes in Canada were rated according to the Fujita scale, but are included in the chart below using their corresponding number rating.

=== May 22 event ===
List of confirmed tornadoes – Thursday, May 22, 2008 (Note: All dates are based on the local time zone where the tornado touched down; however, all times are in Coordinated Universal Time for consistency.)
EF#	Location	County / Parish	State	Coord.	Time (UTC)	Path length	Max width	Summary
EF3	NE of Platteville to Windsor to NE of Fort Collins	Weld, Larimer	CO	40.2323°N 104.7539°W	17:26–18:16	38.69 mi (62.27 km)	1,760 yd (1,610 m)	1 death - See section on this tornado – another 78 people were injured by this long-tracked and significant tornado.
EF1	SW of Dacono	Weld	CO	40.06°N 104.97°W	18:30–18:32	0.1 mi (0.16 km)	100 yd (91 m)	A brief tornado destroyed five outbuildings and overturned a fifth-wheel trailer, injuring the man inside.
EF0	SE of Perkins	Albany	WY	40.9988°N 105.2736°W	18:58–19:00	0.1 mi (0.16 km)	50 yd (46 m)	A brief tornado downed two trees and damaged a garage door.
EF2	SW of Buford to Laramie	Albany	WY	40.9988°N 105.2736°W	18:58–19:35	25.13 mi (40.44 km)	100 yd (91 m)	This strong tornado tracked across the eastern and northern parts of Laramie. A high school, a junior high school and a Wal-Mart were damaged, along with numerous houses nearby. A convenience store and an apartment building had their roofs torn off, and a dance club lost its porch and part of its roof. Trees were downed and semi-trucks were overturned as well. One person was injured near Buford.
EF0	SW of Gove	Gove	KS	38.7351°N 100.7559°W	20:45–20:46	0.5 mi (0.80 km)	10 yd (9.1 m)	A tornado remained over open country, causing no damage.
EF0	S of Grinnell	Gove	KS	38.9563°N 100.63°W	21:07–21:10	3 mi (4.8 km)	50 yd (46 m)	A rope tornado remained over open country, causing no damage.
EF1	W of Selden to SW of Oberlin	Sheridan, Decatur	KS	39.14°N 100.51°W	22:11–22:46	17.6 mi (28.3 km)	400 yd (370 m)	Near Selden, a farmstead sustained EF1 damage, where trees and outbuildings were damaged. Near Oberlin, additional outbuildings were damaged, along with irrigation pivots.
EF0	W of Grainfield	Gove, Sheridan	KS	39.0765°N 100.5101°W	22:25–22:43	10.7 mi (17.2 km)	75 yd (69 m)	A tornado remained over open country, causing no damage.
EF0	S of Wauneta	Chase	NE	40.3621°N 101.37°W	22:29–22:30	0.1 mi (0.16 km)	50 yd (46 m)	A tornado remained over open country, causing no noticeable damage, though a pheasant rooster was found defeathered.
EF0	NW of Alamota	Lane	KS	38.488°N 100.3728°W	22:32–22:38	5.42 mi (8.72 km)	100 yd (91 m)	A tornado remained over open country, causing no damage.
EF1	SW of Oberlin	Decatur	KS	39.7893°N 100.56°W	22:48–23:13	12.5 mi (20.1 km)	300 yd (270 m)	A large tornado damaged or destroyed a number of irrigation pivots. The rear flank downdraft caused additional damage to grain bins and outbuildings.
EF2	W of Hoxie	Sheridan	KS	39.3503°N 100.5107°W	22:55–23:17	9.37 mi (15.08 km)	300 yd (270 m)	A large multiple-vortex tornado tore the roof off of a house and destroyed a large metal outbuilding. Another home sustained lesser damage and a small outbuilding was destroyed nearby. An irrigation sprinkler was overturned, and significant tree damage occurred as well.
EF1	SE of Gove	Gove	KS	38.7879°N 100.1931°W	23:08–23:23	8 mi (13 km)	200 yd (180 m)	Homes sustained severe roof damage, and outbuildings were damaged or destroyed.
EF0	SE of Selden	Sheridan	KS	39.4821°N 100.4679°W	23:18–23:23	2 mi (3.2 km)	75 yd (69 m)	A tornado remained over open country, causing no damage.
EF0	SE of Selden	Sheridan	KS	39.5123°N 100.4352°W	23:20–23:23	0.5 mi (0.80 km)	50 yd (46 m)	A tornado remained over open country, causing no damage.
EF0	S of Collyer	Trego	KS	38.9665°N 100.125°W	23:26–23:42	5 mi (8.0 km)	100 yd (91 m)	This tornado remained over open country, causing no damage.
EF0	SE of March Air Reserve Base	Riverside	CA	33.8399°N 117.23°W	23:30–23:36	0.89 mi (1.43 km)	20 yd (18 m)	A tornado moved through open fields near March Air Reserve Base, causing no damage.
EF1	N of Dresden to N of Lebanon, NE	Decatur (KS), Red Willow (NE)	KS, NE	39.6312°N 100.4205°W	23:31–00:34	34 mi (55 km)	400 yd (370 m)	In Kansas, numerous outbuildings were destroyed and many power poles were snapped. In Nebraska, a stock trailer was pushed 6 feet and 4 oil tanks were blown over, with one being tossed 1/4 of a mile. About 25 additional power poles were damaged or snapped as well.
EF0	SE of Quinter	Gove	KS	38.9597°N 100.1885°W	23:32–23:33	0.5 mi (0.80 km)	25 yd (23 m)	A brief tornado remained over open country, causing no damage.
EF2	W of March Air Reserve Base	Riverside	CA	33.8829°N 117.2549°W	23:42–00:03	2.8 mi (4.5 km)	75 yd (69 m)	A strong tornado crossed Interstate 215 and tossed a semi-truck 40 feet (12 m) into the air, severely injuring the driver. Nine railroad cars were blown off the tracks, and several homes in the area sustained roof damage. This was the first tornado to be rated EF2 on the Enhanced Fujita scale, and it was the first F/EF2 in the state since 1998.
EF0	NW of March Air Reserve Base	Riverside	CA	33.8744°N 117.2708°W	23:50–23:58	0.96 mi (1.54 km)	20 yd (18 m)	This tornado occurred simultaneously with the previous tornado, though this one remained over a field and caused no damage.
EF0	S of Woodcrest	Riverside	CA	33.8028°N 117.3419°W	00:40–00:45	0.36 mi (0.58 km)	10 yd (9.1 m)	A tornado remained over an unpopulated hilly area, causing no damage.
EF1	SW of Utica	Ness	KS	38.547°N 100.2327°W	01:00–01:08	3.5 mi (5.6 km)	150 yd (140 m)	A large shed was destroyed and fencing was downed.
EF0	SE of Pendennis	Lane	KS	38.5388°N 100.288°W	01:05–01:07	1.45 mi (2.33 km)	100 yd (91 m)	A brief tornado remained over open country, causing no damage.
EF0	SW of Trego Center	Trego	KS	38.8186°N 99.9591°W	01:42–01:50	6.9 mi (11.1 km)	150 yd (140 m)	This tornado remained over open country, causing no damage.
EF1	Wakeeney	Trego	KS	38.9888°N 99.9055°W	01:57–02:00	3 mi (4.8 km)	300 yd (270 m)	A rain-wrapped cone tornado caused considerable damage in town. Near the beginning of the path, a hangar and several small airplanes were destroyed at the Trego-Wakeeney Airport, and at a nearby campground, a fifth-wheel trailer was rolled, an unanchored cabin was destroyed, tree limbs were snapped, and shingles were torn from the manager's office roof. As the tornado struck Wakeeney directly, the local high school had part of its roof peeled back, several small storage buildings were destroyed, several trees were uprooted in town, and a large quonset building was destroyed. A brick barn lost its roof before the tornado dissipated.
EF1	E of Cheyenne	Laramie	WY	41.13°N 104.6855°W	02:28–02:31	0.7 mi (1.1 km)	50 yd (46 m)	A pole barn was destroyed.
EF0	SW of Cheyenne	Laramie	WY	41.0891°N 104.8743°W	02:32–02:33	0.3 mi (0.48 km)	30 yd (27 m)	A brief tornado remained over open country and caused no damage.

=== May 23 event ===
List of confirmed tornadoes – Friday, May 23, 2008
EF#	Location	County / Parish	State	Coord.	Time (UTC)	Path length	Max width	Summary
EF0	SE of Gove (1st tornado)	Gove	KS	38.8884°N 100.3354°W	21:02–21:03	0.5 mi (0.80 km)	25 yd (23 m)	Brief tornado remained over open country, causing no damage.
EF1	NW of Cheyenne	Laramie	WY	41.2528°N 104.9832°W	21:13–21:26	2.66 mi (4.28 km)	100 yd (91 m)	Tornado remained mostly over open country, causing little damage.
EF0	NE of Chuggwater to NE of Wheatland	Platte	WY	41.2528°N 104.9832°W	21:26–21:56	20.48 mi (32.96 km)	50 yd (46 m)	Tornado remained over open country, causing no damage.
EF0	S of Gill	Weld	CO	40.39°N 104.52°W	21:33	0.51 mi (0.82 km)	50 yd (46 m)	Small landspout tornado remained over open country, causing no damage.
EF0	SW of Pine Bluffs	Laramie	WY	41.1086°N 104.1515°W	22:09–22:13	2.3 mi (3.7 km)	75 yd (69 m)	Tornado remained over open country, causing no damage.
EF0	SE of Quinter	Gove	KS	39.0165°N 100.2787°W	21:20–21:32	4.5 mi (7.2 km)	400 yd (370 m)	Large tornado remained over open country, causing no damage.
EF0	S of Friend	Finney	KS	38.2228°N 100.7059°W	21:29–21:32	1.5 mi (2.4 km)	75 yd (69 m)	Small tornado caused minor tree damage.
EF1	W of Quinter (1st tornado)	Gove, Sheridan	KS	39.1112°N 100.2406°W	21:34–21:47	5 mi (8.0 km)	200 yd (180 m)	This tornado caused damage to utility poles and trees.
EF2	W of Quinter (2nd tornado)	Gove, Sheridan	KS	39.0905°N 100.2564°W	21:35–22:13	14 mi (23 km)	1,760 yd (1,610 m)	Large wedge tornado. Near the beginning of the path, utility poles, roofs, and outbuildings were damaged. The tornado reached EF2 strength further along the path, damaging farmsteads and snapping numerous utility poles. A mobile home was thrown into a frame home, destroying both structures.
EF1	W of Dighton	Lane	KS	38.447°N 100.539°W	22:01–22:18	8.1 mi (13.0 km)	1,220 yd (1,120 m)	This large wedge tornado damaged irrigation sprinklers and power poles.
EF1	S of Studley	Graham	KS	39.2776°N 100.17°W	22:10–22:46	14 mi (23 km)	400 yd (370 m)	Large wedge tornado snapped numerous power poles.
EF1	N of Dighton	Lane	KS	38.5349°N 100.4961°W	22:13–22:15	1 mi (1.6 km)	150 yd (140 m)	An irrigation sprinkler was damaged.
EF0	NW of Dighton	Lane	KS	38.5225°N 100.4732°W	22:15–22:21	3.2 mi (5.1 km)	75 yd (69 m)	Tornado caused minor tree damage.
EF0	E of Healy	Lane	KS	38.6068°N 100.5493°W	22:22–22:24	1.73 mi (2.78 km)	50 yd (46 m)	Brief tornado remained over open farmland causing no damage.
EF0	SE of Ingalls	Gray	KS	37.7748°N 100.4489°W	22:24–22:25	0.7 mi (1.1 km)	100 yd (91 m)	Very brief tornado remained over open country, causing no damage.
EF1	NW of Shields	Lane	KS	38.6333°N 100.4664°W	22:25–22:43	4.4 mi (7.1 km)	150 yd (140 m)	Tornado caused damage to trees.
EF0	E of Arapahoe	Cheyenne	CO	38.85°N 102.0492°W	22:33–22:34	0.51 mi (0.82 km)	50 yd (46 m)	Tornado remained over open country and caused no damage.
EF0	SE of Gove (2nd tornado)	Gove	KS	38.7093°N 100.352°W	22:35–22:42	5 mi (8.0 km)	100 yd (91 m)	Tornado remained over open country causing no damage.
EF0	NE of Shields	Lane	KS	38.6798°N 100.3987°W	22:45–22:47	1.28 mi (2.06 km)	50 yd (46 m)	Tornado remained over open country, causing no damage.
EF4	SW of Quinter to E of Park	Gove	KS	38.9445°N 100.288°W	23:10–23:31	11.39 mi (18.33 km)	1,320 yd (1,210 m)	Large, violent wedge tornado extensively damaged multiple farmsteads, including one where the farmhouse was swept completely away with only the basement remaining, and two vehicles were thrown 200 yards. A car was thrown from I 70, injuring the driver. Another person was injured when he was struck by flying debris as he climbed into his storm shelter. 2 people were injured.
EF0	N of Kalvesta to SE of Alamota	Finney, Hodgeman, Ness, Lane	KS	38.2325°N 100.2318°W	23:25–23:38	5.73 mi (9.22 km)	75 yd (69 m)	This tornado grazed small sections of 4 different counties. It remained over open country, causing no damage.
EF1	SW of La Grange to SW of Yoder	Goshen	WY	41.5379°N 104.2931°W	23:26–22:13	24.41 mi (39.28 km)	75 yd (69 m)	Tornado remained mainly over open country, though a mobile home lost its roof.
EF0	NW of Englewood	Clark	KS	37.0724°N 100.0556°W	23:37–23:40	2.1 mi (3.4 km)	100 yd (91 m)	Tornado caused minor tree damage.
EF0	SW of Studley	Sheridan	KS	39.2197°N 100.17°W	23:52–00:01	4 mi (6.4 km)	750 yd (690 m)	Large wedge tornado remained over open country, causing no damage.
EF0	SE of Beeler	Ness	KS	38.3177°N 100.1422°W	23:52–23:54	1.6 mi (2.6 km)	60 yd (55 m)	Tornado remained over open country, causing no damage.
EF0	SW of Laird	Ness	KS	38.4091°N 100.0843°W	23:58–00:03	3.61 mi (5.81 km)	100 yd (91 m)	Tornado moved over rural areas causing no damage.
EF1	N of Kaufmann	Weld	CO	40.91°N 103.83°W	00:00	0.1 mi (0.16 km)	50 yd (46 m)	Stock trailers were overturned, and fences and power lines were toppled.
EF0	NW of Ashland	Clark	KS	37.2397°N 99.8949°W	00:01–00:05	2.5 mi (4.0 km)	100 yd (91 m)	Tornado remained over open country, causing no damage.
EF0	NW of Leoti	Wichita	KS	38.4966°N 101.4013°W	00:05–00:06	0.5 mi (0.80 km)	25 yd (23 m)	Brief tornado remained over open country, causing no damage.
EF2	NNE of Beeler to SE of Arnold	Ness	KS	38.4929°N 100.0494°W	00:07–00:39	11.8 mi (19.0 km)	1,410 yd (1,290 m)	A strong wedge tornado heavily damaged trees, large power poles, a large storage tank, a barn, and hay bales.
EF0	SW of Bushnell	Kimball	NE	41.1277°N 104.036°W	00:10–00:16	2.93 mi (4.72 km)	50 yd (46 m)	Tornado remained over open country, causing no damage.
EF0	S of Tasco	Sheridan	KS	39.1764°N 100.2757°W	00:15–00:25	6.1 mi (9.8 km)	350 yd (320 m)	Tornado remained over open country, causing no damage.
EF3	NNE of Ashland to SW of Mullinville	Clark, Kiowa	KS	37.3428°N 99.7264°W	00:25–01:14	20.9 mi (33.6 km)	3,170 yd (2,900 m)	This massive wedge tornado reached a maximum width of 1.8 miles. Near Clark State Lake, numerous power poles were snapped, 20 head of cattle were killed, an oil tank battery was carried 1.8 miles into a grove of trees, and two old houses were destroyed along with several barns. A man attempting to take shelter in one of the barns was injured when the structure was swept completely away. Several semi-trucks were flipped, with another man sustaining severe injuries in one of them. Near Mullinville, a house built with concrete walls had its roof torn off, many trees were snapped, and a power pole from an unknown location was found deposited in a field with wires still attached.
EF2	SE of Arnold	Ness	KS	38.5628°N 100.0055°W	00:25–00:27	1.1 mi (1.8 km)	75 yd (69 m)	Satellite tornado to the Laird area EF2. Extensive tree damage occurred.
EF3	S of Osgood to SW of Cedar Bluff Reservoir	Ness, Trego	KS	38.6085°N 99.8761°W	00:29–00:52	9.01 mi (14.50 km)	715 yd (654 m)	Near Osgood, this large wedge tornado destroyed an old stone house, denuded and debarked trees, killed 5 head of cattle, downed numerous power poles, and carried a farm implement 1/2 of a mile away from where it originated. Near the Cedar Bluff Reservoir, the tornado caused extensive damage to trees and fences before dissipating.
EF1	N of Clark State Lake	Clark	KS	37.2987°N 99.6961°W	00:42–00:53	7.1 mi (11.4 km)	600 yd (550 m)	Tornado caused damage to trees, outbuildings and irrigation sprinklers.
EF1	NE of Clark State Lake	Clark	KS	37.4183°N 99.5828°W	00:42–00:53	1.1 mi (1.8 km)	100 yd (91 m)	Satellite tornado to the very large Mullinville EF3. Damage was limited to trees.
EF1	NW of Brownell	Trego	KS	38.7022°N 99.7308°W	00:49–01:02	8.1 mi (13.0 km)	900 yd (820 m)	A horse trailer was carried 50 feet. Power poles and trees were damaged as well.
EF2	SE of Cedar Bluff Reservoir	Trego	KS	38.7608°N 99.6918°W	00:58–01:21	9 mi (14 km)	1,760 yd (1,610 m)	Mile-wide wedge tornado damaged a house, trees, and power poles. A large outbuilding was completely destroyed, oil tanks were ruptured, and several head of cattle were killed. A combine was rolled by the tornado as well.
EF3	NE of Fort Supply	Harper	OK	36.6663°N 99.5591°W	01:03–01:15	5 mi (8.0 km)	1,100 yd (1,000 m)	A massive, intense tornado caused major damage to two homes, including one that was destroyed. A workshop building was also destroyed, with a semi-cab and a horse trailer stored inside being thrown 50 yards. Another workshop building sustained major damage further along the path, and a heavy, full, fiberglass water tank was moved and destroyed. Two horses were injured by flying debris.
EF0	SE of Joy	Kiowa	KS	37.5271°N 99.38°W	01:11–01:14	1.24 mi (2.00 km)	75 yd (69 m)	Minor tree damage occurred as a result of this tornado.
EF2	SW of Riga	Trego	KS	38.855°N 99.6704°W	01:17–01:36	8.2 mi (13.2 km)	250 yd (230 m)	Tornado caused extensive tree damage.
EF0	SSW of Joy	Kiowa	KS	37.5491°N 99.3761°W	01:17–01:21	1.2 mi (1.9 km)	175 yd (160 m)	Tornado remained over open country, causing no damage.
EF1	Ellis	Ellis	KS	38.9146°N 99.5854°W	01:28–01:33	2.2 mi (3.5 km)	150 yd (140 m)	A tornado struck the town of Ellis directly, damaging outbuildings, a storage tank, power poles, and houses. One person was injured by flying debris.
EF0	NE of Greensburg	Kiowa	KS	37.6262°N 99.2516°W	01:34–01:35	0.5 mi (0.80 km)	20 yd (18 m)	Tornado remained over open country, causing no damage.
EF0	S of Greensburg	Kiowa	KS	37.5201°N 99.293°W	01:35–01:40	1.6 mi (2.6 km)	75 yd (69 m)	Tornado remained over open country, causing no damage.
EF0	N of Ellis (1st tornado)	Ellis	KS	39.0091°N 99.5459°W	01:40–01:54	5.6 mi (9.0 km)	150 yd (140 m)	Tornado remained over open country, causing no damage.
EF1	S of Riga to Ellis	Trego, Ellis	KS	38.8637°N 99.6139°W	01:44–01:55	5.5 mi (8.9 km)	200 yd (180 m)	Second tornado to strike the town of Ellis during this outbreak. Outside of town, trees and power poles were damaged. Within Ellis, outbuildings and power poles were damaged, and numerous homes sustained roof damage.
EF0	NE of Brenham	Kiowa	KS	37.7044°N 99.1778°W	01:56–01:58	1.02 mi (1.64 km)	50 yd (46 m)	Tornado remained over open country, causing no damage.
EF0	N of Buffalo to S of Sitka, KS	Harper (OK), Clark (KS)	OK, KS	36.9503°N 99.6923°W	01:58–02:09	9.1 mi (14.6 km)	125 yd (114 m)	In Oklahoma, a house sustained minor shingle damage, pieces of tin were scattered about, and minor tree damage occurred. Additional minor damage occurred in Kansas before the tornado dissipated.
EF3	NE of Camp Houston, OK to E of Buttermilk, KS	Woods (OK), Comanche (KS)	OK, KS	36.9475°N 99.12°W	01:59–02:19	11 mi (18 km)	980 yd (900 m)	In Oklahoma, this large wedge tornado caused extensive EF2 tree damage. In Kansas, the tornado reached EF3 strength, where several head of cattle were killed, an oil tank was found 2 miles away from where it originated, and several trees were sandblasted and completely debarked. Several antique vehicles were thrown long distances as well, a few of which were never located (likely dropped into isolated ravines in the area).
EF1	SE of Riga to N of Ellis	Trego, Ellis	KS	38.9095°N 99.6108°W	02:07–02:19	6.25 mi (10.06 km)	300 yd (270 m)	Tornado damaged trees, outbuildings, an oil tank, and a grain silo.
EF0	N of Wellsford to SE of Hopewell	Kiowa, Edwards, Pratt	KS	37.7039°N 99.0397°W	02:08–02:17	6.4 mi (10.3 km)	125 yd (114 m)	Tornado remained over open country, causing no damage.
EF1	NW of Turkville	Ellis, Rooks	KS	39.1097°N 99.4615°W	02:08–02:20	4.29 mi (6.90 km)	450 yd (410 m)	Tornado damaged trees, power poles, and an outbuilding.
EF0	N of Ellis (2nd tornado)	Ellis	KS	38.9622°N 99.5526°W	02:16–02:17	0.75 mi (1.21 km)	50 yd (46 m)	Brief tornado remained over open country, causing no damage.
EF3	NW of Pratt to NW of Belpre	Edwards, Pratt, Stafford	KS	37.7477°N 99.0425°W	02:16–02:47	18.2 mi (29.3 km)	1,935 yd (1,769 m)	Large wedge tornado caused damage to trees, irrigation sprinklers, power poles, and grain bins. Several homes were damaged to varying degrees as well. The EF3 rating was based on trees that were debarked and denuded in Stafford County. One person was seriously injured.
EF0	E of Aetna	Barber	KS	37.0717°N 98.9081°W	02:22–02:31	4.6 mi (7.4 km)	150 yd (140 m)	Tornado remained over open country, causing no damage.
EF0	E of Sitka (1st tornado)	Clark, Comanche	KS	37.1782°N 99.5602°W	02:26–02:38	4.5 mi (7.2 km)	100 yd (91 m)	Tornado caused minor tree damage.
EF1	SW of Dodge City	Ford	KS	37.555°N 100.054°W	02:26–02:35	4.5 mi (7.2 km)	100 yd (91 m)	Tornado caused damage to irrigation sprinklers and a grain bin.
EF1	Protection	Comanche	KS	37.1561°N 99.5326°W	02:30–02:40	6 mi (9.7 km)	300 yd (270 m)	Large, high-end EF1 tornado caused damage in the town of Protection. Extensive tree damage occurred outside of town as well.
EF0	E of Deerhead	Barber	KS	37.1922°N 98.8663°W	02:41–02:47	4 mi (6.4 km)	100 yd (91 m)	Tornado caused minor tree damage.
EF0	SW of Dillwyn	Stafford	KS	37.9464°N 98.8729°W	02:44–02:54	5.3 mi (8.5 km)	75 yd (69 m)	Tornado remained over open country, causing no damage.
EF1	SE of Plainville	Rooks	KS	39.20°N 99.26°W	02:45–02:49	6.15 mi (9.90 km)	100 yd (91 m)	Power poles were snapped by the tornado.
EF0	NE of Protection	Comanche	KS	37.2229°N 99.4215°W	02:45–02:53	4.3 mi (6.9 km)	300 yd (270 m)	Tornado caused minor tree damage.
EF2	NW of Coldwater to S of Greensburg	Comanche, Kiowa	KS	37.2703°N 99.4187°W	02:52–03:15	13.5 mi (21.7 km)	1,600 yd (1,500 m)	Near Coldwater, the tornado caused EF1 damage to trees, irrigation sprinklers, and a house. Near Greensburg, the tornado reached EF2 strength, causing extensive tree damage and snapping multiple power poles before dissipating.
EF0	N of Hudson	Stafford	KS	38.039°N 98.7043°W	03:03–03:16	8.9 mi (14.3 km)	100 yd (91 m)	Tornado downed a few power lines.
EF2	NE of Lake City	Barber	KS	37.3716°N 98.7466°W	03:08–03:22	6.9 mi (11.1 km)	250 yd (230 m)	Tornado caused extensive tree damage along its path.
EF0	SW of Greensburg	Kiowa	KS	37.4099°N 99.3049°W	03:11–03:18	3.61 mi (5.81 km)	125 yd (114 m)	Minor tree damage occurred and tin was wrapped around a fence.
EF1	E of Sitka (2nd tornado)	Clark	KS	37.1733°N 99.6204°W	03:12–03:26	10 mi (16 km)	150 yd (140 m)	Tornado caused damage to trees and power poles.
EF2	E of Windthorst to S of Offerle	Ford, Edwards	KS	37.7696°N 99.6187°W	03:12–03:26	17.2 mi (27.7 km)	950 yd (870 m)	Tornado snapped trees and power poles. Irrigation sprinklers, a house, and a grain bin were damaged as well.
EF1	E of Elm Mills	Barber, Pratt	KS	37.4318°N 98.6359°W	03:15–03:35	12.83 mi (20.65 km)	150 yd (140 m)	Damage along the path was limited to trees.
EF0	NE of Elm Mills	Barber, Pratt	KS	37.4359°N 98.6618°W	03:17–03:22	3.27 mi (5.26 km)	100 yd (91 m)	Tornado caused minor tree damage.
EF3	SE of Sawyer to NE of Preston	Pratt	KS	37.484°N 98.6339°W	03:24–04:05	21.9 mi (35.2 km)	1,430 yd (1,310 m)	2 deaths - Tornado lofted a car from Highway 54 and carried it 567 yards through the air before dropping it into a wheat field, killing the couple inside and leaving the vehicle unrecognizable. Another vehicle was tossed into a ditch a short distance down the road, injuring the two occupants. A nearby house was destroyed, and several other homes along the path sustained minor to moderate damage.
EF1	SE of Great Bend	Barton	KS	38.262°N 98.6486°W	03:30–03:32	0.44 mi (0.71 km)	75 yd (69 m)	A house was pushed off of its foundation and a barn was completely destroyed.
EF0	S of Ellinwood	Barton	KS	38.2886°N 98.6507°W	03:38–03:40	0.85 mi (1.37 km)	75 yd (69 m)	Five power poles were snapped and minor tree damage occurred.
EF2	NE of Kinsley	Edwards	KS	37.9254°N 99.3943°W	03:41–03:55	5.4 mi (8.7 km)	125 yd (114 m)	A barn was completely destroyed, extensive tree damage occurred, and two irrigation sprinklers were damaged.
EF0	NW of Byers	Pratt	KS	37.8101°N 98.9219°W	04:04–04:14	4 mi (6.4 km)	75 yd (69 m)	Tornado remained over open country causing no damage.
EF1	W of Olcott	Reno	KS	37.7631°N 98.3963°W	04:10–04:28	6.43 mi (10.35 km)	125 yd (114 m)	A couple of homesteads, several trees, and a few power poles were damaged.
EF0	E of Partridge	Reno	KS	37.97°N 98.02°W	05:11–05:12	0.51 mi (0.82 km)	50 yd (46 m)	Brief tornado touched down in an open field, causing no damage.

=== May 24 event ===
List of confirmed tornadoes – Saturday, May 24, 2008
EF#	Location	County / Parish	State	Coord.	Time (UTC)	Path length	Max width	Summary
EF1	N of Lacey	Kingfisher	OK	36.123°N 98.103°W	19:27–19:39	2 mi (3.2 km)	150 yd (140 m)	A helicopter broadcast live aerial video of this large cone tornado as it severely damaged a pig farm. Some trees and a trailer were damaged as well before the tornado dissipated.
EF2	NW of Hennessey	Kingfisher	OK	36.137°N 98.037°W	19:45–19:56	3 mi (4.8 km)	220 yd (200 m)	An abandoned farmhouse had its roof torn off, trees were snapped and uprooted, grain silos were damaged, power poles were snapped, and wheat was flattened in farm fields.
EF0	SW of Bison	Garfield	OK	36.174°N 97.961°W	20:07–20:16	2 mi (3.2 km)	15 yd (14 m)	A tornado caused minor tree damage.
EF0	SE of Bison	Garfield	OK	36.1734°N 97.7825°W	20:45–20:48	0.1 mi (0.16 km)	20 yd (18 m)	A stone barn was damaged and minor tree damage occurred.
EF0	SW of Douglas	Garfield	OK	36.176°N 97.7363°W	21:10–21:15	1 mi (1.6 km)	100 yd (91 m)	Large metal electrical transmission towers sustained some damage.
EF2	S of Covington	Garfield	OK	36.219°N 97.667°W	21:21–22:18	10 mi (16 km)	1,600 yd (1,500 m)	A large multiple-vortex tornado caused significant tree damage, snapped power poles, destroyed outbuildings, and tossed a well-anchored mobile home onto Highway 74. One residence had its false roof destroyed, and a horse trailer was thrown 300 yards (270 m).
EF0	NE of Cherry Creek	Ziebach	SD	44.82°N 101.17°W	22:04–22:05	0.02 mi (0.032 km)	10 yd (9.1 m)	A brief tornado remained over open country and caused no damage.
EF0	NE of Cherry Creek	Ziebach	SD	44.84°N 101.14°W	22:11–22:12	0.02 mi (0.032 km)	10 yd (9.1 m)	A tornado remained over open country and caused no damage.
EF0	NE of Cherry Creek	Ziebach	SD	44.83°N 101.14°W	22:11–22:12	0.02 mi (0.032 km)	10 yd (9.1 m)	A tornado remained over open country and caused no damage.
EF1	S of Haywood	Garfield	OK	36.188°N 97.494°W	22:17–22:22	1 mi (1.6 km)	80 yd (73 m)	A tornado destroyed a 100-year-old church and caused roof damage to a home. Oil storage equipment was knocked down, and tree damage occurred as well.
EF0	S of Parade	Dewey	SD	44.88°N 101.10°W	22:18–22:19	0.09 mi (0.14 km)	20 yd (18 m)	A tornado destroyed two old sheds, along with part of an old barn.
EF0	SE of Parade	Dewey	SD	44.96°N 101.02°W	22:21–22:22	0.11 mi (0.18 km)	20 yd (18 m)	A tornado remained over open country and caused no damage.
EF0	SW of Thatcher	Dewey	SD	44.9788°N 101.0276°W	22:22–22:23	0.15 mi (0.24 km)	20 yd (18 m)	A tornado remained over open country and caused no damage.
EF0	SW of Thatcher	Dewey	SD	44.9735°N 101.0054°W	22:24–22:36	2.6 mi (4.2 km)	400 yd (370 m)	A tornado remained over open country and caused no damage.
EF0	SE of Haywood	Garfield	OK	36.19°N 97.4667°W	22:53–22:58	1.3 mi (2.1 km)	1,100 yd (1,000 m)	Trees and oil storage tanks were damaged by this large wedge tornado.
EF0	W of Orlando	Logan	OK	36.15°N 97.4338°W	23:02–23:07	1 mi (1.6 km)	100 yd (91 m)	A tornado remained over open country, causing no damage.
EF0	W of Orlando	Logan, Noble	OK	36.158°N 97.405°W	23:03–23:09	1 mi (1.6 km)	50 yd (46 m)	A tornado remained over open country, causing no damage.
EF0	SW of Guelph	Dickey	ND	45.9586°N 98.3184°W	00:38–00:45	4 mi (6.4 km)	50 yd (46 m)	Tree limbs were snapped.
EF0	NW of Oakes	Dickey	ND	46.0609°N 98.289°W	00:50–01:00	5.64 mi (9.08 km)	100 yd (91 m)	One side of a farmhouse sustained minor damage.
EF0	NE of Glover	Dickey	ND	46.13°N 98.1427°W	00:59–01:13	7.9 mi (12.7 km)	100 yd (91 m)	Trees were uprooted and tree limbs were snapped.
EF1	S of New Salem	Morton	ND	46.7698°N 101.4686°W	01:10–01:25	5.55 mi (8.93 km)	75 yd (69 m)	A tornado struck multiple farmsteads, causing minor damage to farmhouses and heavily damaging or destroying multiple outbuildings. Trees were snapped and horse trailers were moved and pushed over.
EF0	SW of Englevale	Ransom	ND	46.35°N 97.94°W	01:20	0.2 mi (0.32 km)	25 yd (23 m)	A very brief tornado remained over open country, causing no damage.
EF0	NW of Sweet Briar	Morton	ND	46.8505°N 101.2099°W	01:24–01:29	2.12 mi (3.41 km)	30 yd (27 m)	A tornado remained over open country, causing no damage.

=== May 25 event ===
List of confirmed tornadoes – Sunday, May 25, 2008
EF#	Location	County / Parish	State	Coord.	Time (UTC)	Path length	Max width	Summary
EF1	NE of Manning	Lane	KS	38.5621°N 100.6751°W	19:57–20:05	3 mi (4.8 km)	100 yd (91 m)	Trees and a barn were damaged.
EF0	E of Scott City	Scott	KS	38.5127°N 100.872°W	19:58–19:59	0.49 mi (0.79 km)	50 yd (46 m)	A very brief tornado remained over open country, causing no damage.
EF0	NW of Channing	Hartley	TX	35.7335°N 102.3573°W	20:29–20:35	1.73 mi (2.78 km)	50 yd (46 m)	Damage was limited to snapped tree branches.
EF0	NE of Channing	Hartley, Moore	TX	35.7414°N 102.2544°W	20:37–20:49	7.65 mi (12.31 km)	75 yd (69 m)	A tornado remained over open country, causing no damage.
EF0	S of Nekoma	Rush	KS	38.4143°N 99.4697°W	20:37–20:40	1.9 mi (3.1 km)	150 yd (140 m)	A multiple-vortex tornado remained over open country, causing no damage.
EF0	SE of La Crosse	Rush	KS	38.5117°N 99.2849°W	21:15–21:16	0.5 mi (0.80 km)	25 yd (23 m)	A very brief tornado remained over open country, causing no damage.
EF0	N of Riga	Trego	KS	39.0136°N 99.6749°W	21:23–21:26	1.22 mi (1.96 km)	75 yd (69 m)	A landspout tornado remained over open country, causing no damage.
EF1	Coon Rapids to Blaine	Anoka	MN	45.2°N 93.34°W	21:35–21:47	6 mi (9.7 km)	100 yd (91 m)	A tornado caused moderate damage in the Minneapolis-St. Paul suburbs of Coon Rapids and Blaine. Numerous trees were snapped and uprooted and homes sustained roof and siding damage. One home was pushed off of its foundation, and several garages and sheds were destroyed as well. Two people were injured in a store parking lot when they were picked up and tossed to the ground by the tornado.
EF0	N of Otis	Rush	KS	38.5526°N 99.0556°W	21:47–21:48	0.5 mi (0.80 km)	50 yd (46 m)	A very brief tornado remained over open country, causing no damage.
EF5	S of Aplington to Parkersburg to W of Fairbank	Grundy, Butler, Black Hawk	IA	42.5512°N 92.882°W	21:48–22:58	40.97 mi (65.93 km)	2,100 yd (1,900 m)	9 deaths - See article on this tornado – A long-lived, massive, and catastrophic EF5 tornado, the first F/EF5 in Iowa since the 1976 Jordan, Iowa F5. The Parkersburg EF5 damaged at least 627 homes, of which 441 were destroyed. Another 21 businesses were destroyed as well. In addition to the 9 fatalities, another 70 people were injured.
EF0	S of Bison	Rush	KS	38.4978°N 99.2177°W	21:49–21:51	1.1 mi (1.8 km)	100 yd (91 m)	A tornado remained over open country, causing no damage.
EF0	W of Timken	Rush	KS	38.4738°N 99.2103°W	21:50–21:53	0.5 mi (0.80 km)	25 yd (23 m)	A slow-moving landspout tornado remained over open country, causing no damage.
EF0	SW of Pringle	Hutchinson	TX	35.9112°N 101.5656°W	21:53–21:54	0.5 mi (0.80 km)	50 yd (46 m)	A tornado remained over open country, causing no damage.
EF3	Lino Lakes to Hugo	Anoka, Washington	MN	45.18°N 93.053°W	21:55–22:05	5.96 mi (9.59 km)	220 yd (200 m)	1 death - A heavily rain-wrapped tornado caused major damage in the Minneapolis-St. Paul suburbs of Lino Lakes and Hugo. In Lino Lakes, the tornado downed trees and lifted boat docks along Peltier Lake. Several barns, grain bins, and silos were destroyed in that area as well. The worst damage occurred in northern Hugo, particularly within the Creekside Preserve subdivision, where many homes were damaged or destroyed. A total of 794 homes were damaged, 91 of which sustained moderate damage. Another 27 homes were destroyed or left uninhabitable, a few of which completely collapsed, though these homes were poorly-constructed and context was not indicative of a violent tornado. The fatality occurred when a two-year-old child was thrown from his home as it was destroyed. Another 17 people were injured.
EF0	NE of Stout	Grundy	IA	42.5501°N 92.6822°W	22:07–22:09	1.07 mi (1.72 km)	50 yd (46 m)	Storm chasers reported a satellite tornado to the south of the main Parkersburg EF5 tornado.
EF0	SW of Marine on St. Croix	Washington	MN	45.1835°N 92.831°W	22:10–22:12	1.04 mi (1.67 km)	50 yd (46 m)	Hundreds of trees damaged at the Warner Nature Reserve, one of which landed on a park building, slightly damaging it.
EF0	Marine on St. Croix to SW of East Farmington, WI	Washington, St. Croix (WI), Polk (WI)	MN, WI	45.2038°N 92.768°W	22:15–22:18	1.25 mi (2.01 km)	50 yd (46 m)	A tornado damaged many trees along the St. Croix River, a few of which landed on homes. Scattered tree damage occurred in Wisconsin as well.
EF0	N of Galatia	Barton	KS	38.6668°N 98.9944°W	22:22–22:23	0.91 mi (1.46 km)	75 yd (69 m)	A tornado remained over open country, causing no damage.
EF0	N of Whipholt	Cass	MN	47.079°N 94.38°W	22:48–22:58	4 mi (6.4 km)	25 yd (23 m)	A waterspout remained over Leech Lake, causing no damage.
EF0	N of Connersville	Dunn	WI	45.185°N 92.125°W	22:55–23:00	3.51 mi (5.65 km)	50 yd (46 m)	Numerous trees were toppled, along with damage to a few barns, silos, and outbuildings.
EF0	N of Galatia	Barton	KS	38.685°N 98.9758°W	22:56–23:02	6.2 mi (10.0 km)	75 yd (69 m)	A tornado remained over open country, causing no damage.
EF3	SE of Fairbank to W of Greeley	Buchanan, Delaware	IA	42.6031°N 92.0183°W	23:05–00:10	31.99 mi (51.48 km)	1,232 yd (1,127 m)	A large, rain-wrapped wedge tornado developed after the EF5 Parkersburg/New Hartford tornado dissipated. In Buchanan county, the tornado struck the south side of Hazleton, where 10 homes, 50 unanchored mobile homes at a dealership, and numerous outbuildings were destroyed. Warehouse buildings were also destroyed, and semi-truck trailers were tossed out into farm fields. Other homes in town sustained structural damage, numerous trees and power poles were downed, and an SUV was flipped, injuring the three people inside. In Delaware County, the tornado weakened to EF1 strength, damaging farmsteads, trees, and power lines before dissipating.
EF1	NE of Weldon	Clarke	IA	40.94°N 93.69°W	23:25–23:37	6.84 mi (11.01 km)	50 yd (46 m)	A brief tornado remained over open country, causing minimal damage.
EF0	WNW of Murphysboro	Jackson	IL	37.8369°N 89.3651°W	23:35–23:36	0.21 mi (0.34 km)	20 yd (18 m)	A brief tornado remained over open country, causing no damage.
EF1	S of Lamont	Buchanan	IA	42.53°N 91.66°W	23:40–23:45	3.45 mi (5.55 km)	100 yd (91 m)	Outbuildings and trees were damaged.
EF0	NE of Holyrood	Ellsworth	KS	38.61°N 98.37°W	23:55–23:57	0.47 mi (0.76 km)	50 yd (46 m)	A tornado remained over open country, causing no damage.
EF0	N of New Cambria	Saline	KS	38.96°N 97.52°W	00:05–00:06	0.87 mi (1.40 km)	50 yd (46 m)	A tornado remained over open country, causing no damage.
EF0	NW of Hamilton	Pembina	ND	48.83°N 97.53°W	00:19	0.2 mi (0.32 km)	25 yd (23 m)	A brief tornado remained over open country, causing no damage.
EF1	S of Petersburg to N of Dyersville	Delaware, Dubuque	IA	42.5363°N 91.2704°W	00:31–00:43	8.48 mi (13.65 km)	25 yd (23 m)	Near Petersburg, trees, power poles, and numerous farm outbuildings were damaged. Near Dyersville, the tornado damaged over 1,000 trees at New Wine Park before dissipating.
EF0	SE of Mosinee	Marathon	WI	44.739°N 89.626°W	02:00–02:01	0.05 mi (0.080 km)	10 yd (9.1 m)	A brief tornado damaged several apple trees and blew a pine tree over onto a shed.
EF1	S of Victor	Iowa	IA	41.69°N 92.3°W	04:06–04:19	6.23 mi (10.03 km)	440 yd (400 m)	Grain bins and other farm outbuildings were damaged or destroyed.
EF0	N of North Liberty	Johnson	IA	41.7889°N 91.6101°W	04:38–04:39	0.11 mi (0.18 km)	100 yd (91 m)	One home suffered minor roof, gutter, and siding damage and also had its garage door blown in. A few trees were uprooted and snapped off as well.

=== May 26 event ===
List of confirmed tornadoes – Monday, May 26, 2008
EF#	Location	County / Parish	State	Coord.	Time (UTC)	Path length	Max width	Summary
F0	Windy Lake Provincial Park	Greater Sudbury	ON	46.6122°N 81.4428°W	20:40	0.3 mi (0.48 km)	50 yd (46 m)	No information is available.
EF0	S of Wellsford	Kiowa	KS	37.5576°N 99.0309°W	23:04–23:05	0.3 mi (0.48 km)	25 yd (23 m)	A very brief tornado remained over open country and caused no damage.
EF0	SE of Baldridge	Pecos	TX	30.87°N 102.59°W	23:07–23:09	0.69 mi (1.11 km)	50 yd (46 m)	A tornado remained over open country, causing no damage.
EF1	NE of Macksville	Stafford	KS	37.9808°N 98.9549°W	23:08–23:10	1 mi (1.6 km)	100 yd (91 m)	Trees and an irrigation sprinkler were damaged.
EF0	NE of Wellington	Collingsworth	TX	34.8634°N 100.2133°W	23:26–23:27	0.05 mi (0.080 km)	25 yd (23 m)	A tornado remained over open country, causing no damage.
EF0	NW of Dodson	Collingsworth	TX	34.8903°N 100.0807°W	23:43–23:44	0.04 mi (0.064 km)	25 yd (23 m)	A tornado remained over open country, causing no damage.
EF0	S of Pratt	Pratt	KS	37.6085°N 98.7211°W	00:05–00:07	1.2 mi (1.9 km)	25 yd (23 m)	A tornado remained over open country, causing no damage.
EF1	E of Pratt	Pratt	KS	37.6308°N 98.6763°W	00:09–00:13	2.2 mi (3.5 km)	100 yd (91 m)	Trees and power poles were damaged.

=== May 27 event ===
List of confirmed tornadoes – Tuesday, May 27, 2008
EF#	Location	County / Parish	State	Coord.	Time (UTC)	Path length	Max width	Summary
EF0	SE of Olney	Richland	IL	38.6631°N 88.0445°W	17:40	0.1 mi (0.16 km)	10 yd (9.1 m)	A brief landspout remained over open country, causing no damage.
EF0	E of Graham	Daviess	IN	38.7194°N 87.172°W	19:12–19:13	0.1 mi (0.16 km)	10 yd (9.1 m)	A tornado remained over open country, causing no damage.
EF0	N of Friendship	Dawson	TX	32.6807°N 102.03°W	00:02–00:03	0.29 mi (0.47 km)	50 yd (46 m)	A tornado remained over open country, causing no damage.
EF0	NW of Patricia	Dawson	TX	32.586°N 102.1231°W	00:44–00:45	1.03 mi (1.66 km)	50 yd (46 m)	A brief tornado remained over open country, causing no damage.
EF0	SW of Friendship	Dawson	TX	32.59°N 102.16°W	01:00–01:01	0.35 mi (0.56 km)	50 yd (46 m)	A brief tornado remained over open country, causing no damage.

== See also ==
- Tornadoes of 2008
- List of Mid-May 2008 tornado outbreak sequence tornadoes
- List of EF5 tornadoes
