= Trenton Township, Kansas =

Trenton Township
- Township
- Location in Edwards County
- Coordinates: 37°49′33″N 099°30′55″W
- Country: United States
- State: Kansas
- County: Edwards

Area
  - Total: 52.56 sq mi (136.13 km^{2})
  - Land: 52.56 sq mi (136.13 km^{2})
  - Water: 0 sq mi (0 km^{2}) 0%
- Elevation: 2,230 ft (680 m)

Population (2020)
  - Total: 239
  - Density: 4.55/sq mi (1.76/km^{2})
- GNIS feature ID: 0473541

Trenton Township is a township in Edwards County, Kansas, United States. As of the 2020 census, its population was 239.

== Geography ==
Trenton Township covers an area of 52.56 square miles (136.1 km^{2}) and contains one incorporated settlement, Offerle.
