= Kinsley Township, Kansas =

Kinsley Township
- Township
- Location in Edwards County
- Coordinates: 37°56′33″N 099°24′18″W
- Country: United States
- State: Kansas
- County: Edwards

Area
  - Total: 46.79 sq mi (121.18 km^{2})
  - Land: 46.78 sq mi (121.16 km^{2})
  - Water: 0.0077 sq mi (0.02 km^{2}) 0.02%
- Elevation: 2,159 ft (658 m)

Population (2020)
  - Total: 112
  - Density: 2.39/sq mi (0.924/km^{2})
- GNIS feature ID: 0473547

Kinsley Township is a township in Edwards County, Kansas, United States. As of the 2020 census, its population was 112.

== Geography ==
Kinsley Township covers an area of 46.79 square miles (121.2 km^{2}) and contains one incorporated settlement, Kinsley (the county seat). According to the USGS, it contains three cemeteries: Hillside, Old Kinsley and Saint Nicholas.

The stream of Little Coon Creek runs through this township.

== Transportation ==
Kinsley Township contains one airport or landing strip, Kinsley Municipal Airport.
