= Nettleton, Kansas =

Unincorporated community in Edwards County, Kansas

Coordinates: 37.999°N 99.328°W

Nettleton is an unincorporated community in Edwards County, Kansas, United States.

== History ==
Nettleton once had a post office, but prior to February, 1878, this post office was called Fitchburgh. The post office in the town opened in 1877, closed in 1882, was re-established in 1903, closed again in 1904, opened again in 1912, and closed permanently in 1917.
