= Kyle Burkhart =

American gridiron football player (born 1986)

Profile
- Position: Offensive tackle

Personal information
- Born: September 18, 1986 (age 40); Kinsley, Kansas
- Listed height: 6 ft 4 in (1.93 m)
- Listed weight: 295 lb (134 kg)

Career information
- High school: Kinsley (KS)
- College: Southern Mississippi
- NFL draft: 2010: undrafted

Career history
- Seattle Seahawks (2010); Hartford Colonials (2010); BC Lions (2011)

Kyle Burkhart (born September 18, 1986) is an American former football tackle. He is from Kinsley, KS.

== Professional career ==
After going undrafted in the 2010 NFL draft, Burkhart signed a free agent contract with the Seattle Seahawks. After being released from the Seahawks due to injury. After he was again released due to injury, he then signed with the Hartford Colonials of the UFL for the 2010 season. Burkhart signed with the BC Lions of the CFL for 2011 season. Burkhart retired from playing football before the 2012 season.

== Post-football career ==
He took over as the head football coach for his alma mater, Kinsley High School, starting in June 2016.

=== 2010 NFL draft ===
Pre-draft measurables
Height	Weight	40-yard dash	10-yard split	20-yard split	20-yard shuttle	Three-cone drill	Broad jump
6 ft 4 in (1.93 m)	295 lb (134 kg)	5.14 s	1.68 s	2.92 s	4.62 s	7.65 s	8 ft 6 in (2.59 m)
Pulled hamstring during 40 yard dash, but still completed rest of pro day events
