= Franklin Township, Edwards County, Kansas =

Franklin Township
- Township
- Location in Edwards County
- Coordinates: 37°49′32″N 099°11′15″W
- Country: United States
- State: Kansas
- County: Edwards

Area
  - Total: 73.56 sq mi (190.52 km^{2})
  - Land: 73.56 sq mi (190.52 km^{2})
  - Water: 0 sq mi (0 km^{2}) 0%
- Elevation: 2,129 ft (649 m)

Population (2020)
  - Total: 92
  - Density: 1.3/sq mi (0.48/km^{2})
- GNIS feature ID: 0473554

Franklin Township is a township in Edwards County, Kansas, United States. As of the 2020 census, its population was 92.

== Geography ==
Franklin Township covers an area of 73.56 square miles (190.5 km^{2}) and contains no incorporated settlements. According to the USGS, it contains one cemetery, Fellsburg.
