= South Brown Township, Kansas =

South Brown Township
- Township
- Location in Edwards County
- Coordinates: 37°46′40″N 099°23′46″W
- Country: United States
- State: Kansas
- County: Edwards

Area
  - Total: 97.0 sq mi (251.1 km^{2})
  - Land: 97.0 sq mi (251.1 km^{2})
  - Water: 0 sq mi (0 km^{2}) 0%
- Elevation: 2,230 ft (680 m)

Population (2020)
  - Total: 90
  - Density: 1.0/sq mi (0.4/km^{2})
- GNIS feature ID: 0473748

South Brown Township is a township in Edwards County, Kansas, United States. As of the 2020 census, its population was 90.

== Geography ==
South Brown Township covers an area of 96.95 square miles (251.1 km^{2}) and contains no incorporated settlements. According to the USGS, it contains one cemetery, Bethel.
