= North Brown Township, Kansas =

North Brown Township
- Township
- Location in Edwards County
- Coordinates: 37°52′09″N 099°18′49″W
- Country: United States
- State: Kansas
- County: Edwards

Area
  - Total: 63.14 sq mi (163.53 km^{2})
  - Land: 63.11 sq mi (163.45 km^{2})
  - Water: 0.031 sq mi (0.08 km^{2}) 0.05%
- Elevation: 2,182 ft (665 m)

Population (2020)
  - Total: 53
  - Density: 0.84/sq mi (0.32/km^{2})
- GNIS feature ID: 0473752

North Brown Township is a township in Edwards County, Kansas, United States. As of the 2020 census, its population was 53.

== Geography ==
North Brown Township covers an area of 63.14 square miles (163.5 km^{2}) and contains no incorporated settlements. According to the USGS, it contains one cemetery, Trotter.
