= Jackson Township, Edwards County, Kansas =

Jackson Township
- Township
- Location in Edwards County
- Coordinates: 38°00′02″N 099°30′52″W
- Country: United States
- State: Kansas
- County: Edwards

Area
  - Total: 72.4 sq mi (187.5 km^{2})
  - Land: 72.36 sq mi (187.41 km^{2})
  - Water: 0.035 sq mi (0.09 km^{2}) 0.05%
- Elevation: 2,290 ft (698 m)

Population (2020)
  - Total: 51
  - Density: 0.70/sq mi (0.27/km^{2})
- GNIS feature ID: 0473540

Jackson Township is a township in Edwards County, Kansas, United States. As of the 2020 census, its population was 51.

== Geography ==
Jackson Township covers an area of 72.39 square miles (187.5 km^{2}) and contains no incorporated settlements.
