= List of tornadoes in the outbreak sequence of May 7–11, 2008 =

This is a list of confirmed tornadoes produced by the tornado outbreak sequence of May 7–11, 2008, which spawned a total of at least 120 tornadoes confirmed across the southern United States from May 7 to May 11, 2008. The event consisted of three different systems and a total of 25 people were killed.

The first tornado outbreak took place on May 7–8 affecting at first Oklahoma on May 7. Then the activity shifted across the southeast on May 8 with two separate main areas of activity. One person was killed in North Carolina. The second tornado outbreak lasted for 24 hours on May 10–11 and produced the deadliest tornado of the outbreak sequence. Twenty-one people were killed from a tornado that traveled across northeastern Oklahoma and southern Missouri. Three other people were killed including two in Georgia and one more in Missouri.

== Confirmed tornadoes ==
Confirmed tornadoes by Enhanced Fujita rating
EFU	EF0	EF1	EF2	EF3	EF4	EF5	Total
0	49	41	23	5	2	0	120

Tornadoes by day and state of touchdown
	OK	MS	AL	TN	OH	VA	NC	MD	KS	AR	MO	GA	SC	KY	TX	IN	WY	Total
May 7	6	–	–	–	–	–	–	–	–	–	–	–	–	–	4	–	–	10
May 8	–	3	8	2	3	5	3	2	2	–	–	–	–	–	–	–	–	28
May 9	–	–	–	–	–	–	3	–	–	–	–	–	–	–	–	–	1	4
May 10	13	2	3	–	–	–	–	–	3	11	2	–	–	–	–	–	–	34
May 11	–	–	4	–	1	–	10	–	–	–	–	19	6	3	–	1	–	44
Total	19	5	15	2	4	5	16	2	5	11	2	19	6	3	4	1	1	120

=== May 7 event ===
List of confirmed tornadoes – Wednesday, May 7, 2008 (Note: All dates are based on the local time zone where the tornado touched down; however, all times are in Coordinated Universal Time for consistency.)
EF#	Location	County / Parish	State	Start Coord.	Time (UTC)	Path length	Max width	Summary
EF0	NNW of Smyer	Hockley	TX	33.6426°N 102.1921°W	16:50–16:52	1.2 mi (1.9 km)	20 yd (18 m)	Several people reported a rope tornado.
EF0	S of Casper	Natrona	WY	42.806°N 106.3181°W	21:12	0.05 mi (0.080 km)	30 yd (27 m)	A car was lifted off the ground, and flying debris was spotted.
EF1	ESE of Paoli	Garvin	OK	34.8023°N 97.1786°W	21:56–21:57	0.5 mi (0.80 km)	30 yd (27 m)	A mobile home was moved off its foundation; one occupant was injured. Trees were damaged near the residence.
EF1	E of Yukon	Canadian, Oklahoma	OK	35.5°N 97.7222°W	21:57–22:09	7.5 mi (12.1 km)	120 yd (110 m)	A residence lost a portion of its roof, and sporadic damage to fences was observed. Several bleachers were damaged next to a baseball field, and trees were downed, including one that fell on a gas plant and prompted the evacuation of about 50 residents. An apartment complex suffered some damage. A woman broke her leg running to her tornado shelter.
EF0	S of Norman	McClain, Cleveland	OK	35.1449°N 97.4737°W	22:21–22:31	4.6 mi (7.4 km)	25 yd (23 m)	Intermittent roof, tree, and roof flashing damage was reported.
EF0	N of The Village	Oklahoma	OK	35.6369°N 97.5841°W	22:22–22:26	2.8 mi (4.5 km)	20 yd (18 m)	A residence and an apartment complex sustained roof damage. Scattered tree and sign damage was reported as well.
EF0	SSW of Beggs	Okmulgee	OK	35.6507°N 96.1228°W	23:40–23:45	4 mi (6.4 km)	200 yd (180 m)	A small barn was destroyed, a mobile home was damaged, and numerous trees and power lines were toppled.
EF0	Broken Arrow	Tulsa	OK	36.0592°N 95.8125°W	00:28–00:29	0.3 mi (0.48 km)	50 yd (46 m)	Portions of a storage building at a college was blown off. Roofs of a business and several homes were damaged. Power lines and trees were blown down.
EF0	SSE of Bremond	Robertson	TX	31.14°N 96.66°W	01:10–01:12	0.99 mi (1.59 km)	50 yd (46 m)	Power lines were downed and trees were damaged.
EF1	E of Bremond	Robertson	TX	31.1846°N 96.5369°W	01:15–01:23	2.6 mi (4.2 km)	250 yd (230 m)	Numerous trees were downed or damaged.
EF0	NE of Franklin	Robertson	TX	31.0829°N 96.438°W	01:39–01:48	2.08 mi (3.35 km)	50 yd (46 m)	The Franklin Fire Department reported a tornado.

=== May 8 event ===
List of confirmed tornadoes – Thursday, May 8, 2008
EF#	Location	County / Parish	State	Start Coord.	Time (UTC)	Path length	Max width	Summary
EF3	Tupelo	Lee	MS	34.2599°N 88.7935°W	13:01–13:19	7.56 mi (12.17 km)	200 yd (180 m)	A significant tornado produced extensive damage to the Furniture Market Mississippi building in Tupelo. It then struck a farm supply store, where flying debris damaged several cars, tractor trailers were overturned, and part of the store's roof was ripped off. A marine and outdoor store nearby saw several of its boats damaged and roof partially torn off. A large hardware store, a medical complex, and a Mississippi Department of Transportation district office were also among many other structures damaged. Large trees were snapped or uprooted.
EF2	SW of Marietta	Itawamba	MS	34.4289°N 88.5264°W	13:42–13:45	1.4 mi (2.3 km)	100 yd (91 m)	One house was heavily damaged and numerous other houses had minor damage. Many large trees were snapped.
EF0	Abbeville	Lafayette	MS	34.5034°N 89.5123°W	14:15–14:19	2.2 mi (3.5 km)	50 yd (46 m)	Minor damage was reported to nine houses and one mobile home.
EF1	NW of Florence	Lauderdale	AL	34.84°N 87.87°W	16:57–17:04	7.99 mi (12.86 km)	200 yd (180 m)	Five homes were damaged and several trees were uprooted. Two people were injured by flying glass.
EF1	NW of Loretto	Lawrence	TN	35.0778°N 87.4868°W	17:35–17:42	3.02 mi (4.86 km)	440 yd (400 m)	A barn was destroyed and several trees were snapped or uprooted; one tree fell on a home.
EF2	NE of Leighton to N of Rogersville	Colbert, Lawrence, Lauderdale	AL	34.7377°N 87.4677°W	17:39–18:02	12.62 mi (20.31 km)	250 yd (230 m)	A strong tornado began in Colbert County, throwing two cars nearly 40 ft (12 m) at an equipment company. One home was destroyed and a second was heavily damaged, large trees were snapped or uprooted, and an 18-wheeler was overturned. It continued into Lawrence County, producing significant structural damage to the Doublehead Resort and Lodge; a two-story house was lifted off its foundation and moved nearly 20 ft (6.1 m), and the entire roof and west facade was ripped off. The tornado weakened in Lauderdale County, producing sporadic damage to a garage and large trees before lifting.
EF1	Kansas	Fayette, Walker	AL	33.865°N 87.733°W	18:06–18:25	11.04 mi (17.77 km)	100 yd (91 m)	A shed was destroyed with another one damaged. Trees were also snapped.
EF0	SE of Pulaski	Giles	TN	35.142°N 86.9564°W	18:45–18:47	0.85 mi (1.37 km)	50 yd (46 m)	Trees were snapped, uprooted, or twisted.
EF0	SE of Selkirk	Wichita	KS	38.3898°N 101.4876°W	18:49–18:56	2 mi (3.2 km)	25 yd (23 m)	A trained storm spotter reported a tornado over open fields.
EF1	SE of Arley	Walker, Cullman	AL	33.9718°N 87.1825°W	19:00–19:07	3.27 mi (5.26 km)	600 yd (550 m)	Hundreds of trees were snapped or uprooted, at least six chicken houses were damaged or destroyed, and at least five boat houses were demolished in Walker County. A roof was partially torn off a chicken house in Cullman County.
EF1	NW of Hartselle	Morgan	AL	34.478°N 87.0022°W	19:15–19:17	0.86 mi (1.38 km)	50 yd (46 m)	Multiple medium to large trees were uprooted, and several smaller trees and branches were snapped.
EF1	Trimble	Cullman	AL	34.0785°N 86.9988°W	19:20–19:32	3.27 mi (5.26 km)	100 yd (91 m)	Several large trees were snapped or uprooted, some of which caused damage to apartments and campers upon falling.
EF0	SE of Tribune	Greeley	KS	38.3984°N 101.6586°W	19:27–19:46	5 mi (8.0 km)	100 yd (91 m)	A storm chaser observed a dusty tornado over open fields.
EF1	SW of Triana	Limestone, Madison	AL	34.5707°N 86.8201°W	19:35–19:43	4.01 mi (6.45 km)	250 yd (230 m)	Wheat and grass was flattened and one residence had minor roof damage.
EF1	NE of Cullman	Cullman	AL	34.1823°N 86.8014°W	19:40–19:48	6.58 mi (10.59 km)	100 yd (91 m)	Several large trees were snapped or uprooted. A pair of chicken houses were heavily damaged; one was completely collapsed, with the central portion of the structure twisted and its metal roofing torn off and tossed downstream.
EF0	Port William	Clinton	OH	39.55°N 83.78°W	21:20–21:22	0.39 mi (0.63 km)	20 yd (18 m)	Minor tree and trailer damage occurred.
EF0	Jamestown	Greene	OH	39.6543°N 83.7285°W	21:25–21:27	0.07 mi (0.11 km)	10 yd (9.1 m)	An emergency manager reported a tornado.
EF0	NNE of Selma	Clark	OH	39.7895°N 83.7169°W	22:13–22:15	0.16 mi (0.26 km)	10 yd (9.1 m)	A trained storm spotter reported a tornado.
EF1	N of Figsboro	Henry, Franklin	VA	36.7965°N 79.8518°W	00:00–00:03	0.93 mi (1.50 km)	75 yd (69 m)	Numerous trees were downed and two homes were damaged.
EF1	N of Pullens	Pittsylvania	VA	36.9346°N 79.5096°W	01:00–01:03	0.84 mi (1.35 km)	60 yd (55 m)	Numerous trees were snapped, and nearby homes suffered some damage.
EF2	N of Advance	Davie, Forsyth	NC	35.9639°N 80.4613°W	02:15–02:24	3.54 mi (5.70 km)	100 yd (91 m)	A frame house was heavily damaged.
EF0	NE of Shipman	Nelson	VA	37.7272°N 78.8388°W	02:20–02:21	0.19 mi (0.31 km)	50 yd (46 m)	Two homes suffered significant structural damage. One saw part of its roof removed and its porch lifted from its foundation. Several trees were uprooted and a car was overturned.
EF3	SE of Clemmons	Forsyth	NC	35.9835°N 80.3753°W	02:25–02:34	2.9 mi (4.7 km)	300 yd (270 m)	A significant tornado destroyed three homes and inflicted moderate damage to about thirty others. Several other homes suffered damage largely from fallen trees. Two people were injured.
EF1	W of Hixburg	Appomattox	VA	37.3244°N 78.697°W	03:20–03:21	0.68 mi (1.09 km)	50 yd (46 m)	Numerous trees were downed and two homes and two small structures were damaged. The tornado was embedded within a larger area of straight-line winds.
EF2	W of Greensboro	Guilford	NC	36.059°N 80.0206°W	03:29–03:37	3.85 mi (6.20 km)	200 yd (180 m)	1 death – Numerous warehouses sustained significant damage, the roof was blown off an office building, and numerous vehicles and tractor trailers were overturned; a man who slept in the rig of one of these tractor trailers was killed. Three other people were injured, two in vehicles and one in a warehouse.
EF0	Clinton	Prince George's	MD	38.768°N 76.9438°W	04:24–04:28	0.54 mi (0.87 km)	50 yd (46 m)	Numerous trees were downed onto homes, inflicting substantial damage.
EF0	Camp Springs	Prince George's	MD	38.8317°N 76.9141°W	04:56–05:00	0.48 mi (0.77 km)	100 yd (91 m)	Numerous trees were downed onto townhouses, inflicting substantial damage.

=== May 9 event ===
List of confirmed tornadoes – Friday, May 9, 2008
EF#	Location	County / Parish	State	Start Coord.	Time (UTC)	Path length	Max width	Summary
EF2	Gastonia to Northern Charlotte	Gaston, Mecklenburg	NC	35.2535°N 81.1765°W	06:10–06:36	18.21 mi (29.31 km)	75 yd (69 m)	The first of two EF2 tornadoes in North Carolina on May 9 touched down around 1:10 am EST near Gastonia. Upon first touching down, the tornado tore off the roof of an office building. Traveling towards the east-northeast, it damaged numerous homes and uprooted trees before crossing Interstate 85 where it blew several cars of the road. Near the interstate, a metal roof was ripped off a large warehouse and another business was damaged before the tornado moved into Mecklenburg County. After moving into Mecklenburg, the tornado produced only minor tree damage before lifting near Charlotte. No injuries were reported as a result of the tornado and damages amounted to $7 million along its 18 miles (29 km) path.
EF2	ENE of Trap to NW of Ryland	Bertie, Hertford, Chowan	NC	36.2043°N 76.8241°W	12:29–12:49	11.7 mi (18.8 km)	300 yd (270 m)	The second EF2 tornado in North Carolina touched down around 7:29 am EST near the town of Trap. It destroyed one barn in Bertie County and downed several trees before moving into Hertford. The tornado tore the roofs off of two homes in Hertford along a 5 miles (8.0 km) path before entering Chowan County. The tornado weakened slightly once in Chowan, minor damages in the county were reported to some structures and several trees. No injuries were reported as a result of the tornado and damages amounted to $120,000 along its 12 miles (19 km) path.
EF0	NNW of Elizabeth City	Pasquotank	NC	36.3535°N 76.2575°W	13:30–13:32	0.5 mi (0.80 km)	50 yd (46 m)	A brief tornado touched down to the north-northwest of Elizabeth City. One mobile home was shifted off its foundation and another was damaged by a fallen tree. No injuries were reported as a result of the tornado and damages amounted to $15,000.
EF0	SE of Rochelle	Weston	NC	43.552°N 104.881°W	20:12–20:15	0.1 mi (0.16 km)	150 yd (140 m)	An airplane pilot reported a brief tornado and two funnel clouds over open fields.

=== May 10 event ===
List of reported tornadoes – Saturday, May 10, 2008
EF#	Location	County	Coord.	Time (UTC)	Path length	Damage
Oklahoma
EF2	NW of Haywood to McAlester	Pittsburg	34°56′N 95°48′W	2203	8 miles (12.8 km)	KFOR-TV reports numerous houses destroyed in the area west of McAlester. The tornado was caught on tape from the air by KFOR helicopter reporter Jim Gardner and photojournalist Cody Crouch, as the storm weakened and dissipated in McAlester causing minor damage in the city.
EF0	NE of Checotah	McIntosh		2219	unknown	Brief tornado over open country
EF4	Picher/Neosho, Missouri areas	Craig, Ottawa, Newton (MO), Barry (MO)	36°55′N 94°35′W	2220	75 miles (121 km)	21 deaths – See article on this tornado
EF0	SE of Crowder	Pittsburg	35°05′N 95°38′W	2221	unknown	Tornado reported by a media chaser. No damage reported.
EF0	SW of McAlester	Pittsburg		2225	1 mile (1.6 km)	Damage to trees
EF0	NE of Pryor	Mayes	36°35′N 95°27′W	2225	0.1 mile (160 m)	Tornado remained in open country with minor tree damage.
EF0	Wilburton area	Latimer		2234	6 miles (9.6 km)	Tornado over a remote area
EF2	SW of Hartshorne to Yanush	Latimer, Pittsburg		2242	22 miles (35 km)	Tornado destroyed mobile homes, sheds, a business, barns and outbuildings with heavy damage to houses including some destroyed in Yanush. 4 people were injured.
EF1	E of Quapaw	Ottawa		2248	2 miles (3.2 km)	Satellite tornado adjacent to the main Picher-Racine tornado. The tornado merged into the main cyclone and it enlarged to 1 mile (1.6 km) in width entering Missouri.
EF2	E of Daisy	Atoka, Pushmataha	34°33′N 95°41′W	2305	3.5 miles (5.6 km)	Three houses were heavily damaged. One woman was trapped but not injured. Trees were snapped and uprooted
EF1	N of Snow	Pushmataha	34°45′N 93°53′W	2330	1.5 miles (2.4 km)	Trees were snapped or uprooted
EF1	E of Albion	Pushmataha	34°45′N 93°53′W	2335	1 mile (1.6 km)	Trees were snapped or uprooted
EF0	SW of Smithville	McCurtain		0005	0.25 mile (400 m)	Damage limited to trees
Kansas
EF0	N of Oswego	Labette		2215	unknown	Brief touchdown a corn stalk field
EF0	SE of Oswego	Labette		2219	1 mile (1.6 km)	Brief touchdown in an open field
EF0	W of Faulkner	Cherokee	37°10′N 95°05′W	2219	2 miles (3.2 km)	Intermittent tornado path with minor damage to one house and a grain elevator.
Arkansas
EF1	S of Bentonville	Benton		2335	1.5 miles (2.4 km)	Tornado spotted near a Wal-Mart according to 40/29 News coverage. Part of a roof was blown off a school.
EF1	W of Center Hill	White		0014	9 miles (14.4 km)	Damage to trees
EF0	SW of Russell	White		0042	unknown	Brief tornado touchdown in an open field with no damage reported.
EF1	SW of Fairmont	Lonoke, Prairie		0047	unknown	Damage limited to trees
EF0	E of Watalula	Franklin	35°34′N 93°50′W	0051	unknown	Tornado sighted with minor damage to trees.
EF1	SW of Avon	Sevier		0055	2 miles (3.2 km)	Many trees were snapped, some of which fell on and damaged houses.
EF1	Tipp area	Woodruff, Cross	35°15′N 91°17′W	0057	10.2 miles (16.5 km)	A carport and tractor shed were destroyed, and several farm buildings were heavily damaged. Some houses also lost shingles.
EF3	Stuttgart area	Arkansas	34°49′N 91°55′W	0057	14 miles (22.4 km)	Structural damage to many buildings reported in town, and trees were reported downed. 200 houses, 50 businesses, a nursing home, school buildings and several churches were damaged. Nine people were injured.
EF1	SE of Lawrenceville	Monroe		0126	4.4 miles (7 km)	Damage mostly consisted of downed trees, although one house lost parts of its roof.
EF0	SE of Oakhaven	Hempstead		0204	1 mile (1.6 km)	A metal farm outbuilding had roof damage.
EF1	SW of Rosston	Nevada	33°58′N 93°31′W	0232	2 miles (3.2 km)	Damage primarily in a wooded area
Missouri
EF1	E of Carthage	Jasper	37°18′N 94°24′W	2308	3.25 miles (5.2 km)	1 death – One mobile home was destroyed by fallen trees (where the fatality took place). Several other houses were damaged and outbuildings were destroyed.
EF0	NW of Jenkins	Barry	36°47′N 93°44′W	2358	4 miles (6.4 km)	Damage limited to trees
Mississippi
EF1	West Marks	Quitman		0233	0.33 mile (550 m)	Brief tornado damaged a few houses and a metal building.
EF1	Enid area	Tallahatchie, Yalobusha	34°14′N 90°01′W	0318	8.5 miles (14 km)	Heavy damage reported in the area. 28 houses damaged, several seriously. Three mobile homes were destroyed. Two people were injured.
Alabama
EF1	E of Wright	Lauderdale		0400	1.6 miles (2.6 km)	A barn and an outbuilding were destroyed, throwing roofing materials up to 1/2 mile (800 m) away.
EF1	S of Shottsville	Marion		0418	25 miles (40 km)	Tornado embedded in a derecho that moved across the area. Thousands of trees were snapped or uprooted. Several mobile homes were damaged and one carport was also damaged. Report courtesy of ABC 33-40.
EF1	N of Anderson	Lauderdale		0459	1.5 miles (2.4 km)	Minor structural damage reported to an outbuilding. Many trees snapped.
Sources: Storms Reports for May 10, 2008, NWS Springfield, NWS Little Rock, NWS Tulsa, NWS Tulsa - Multimedia Presentation, 2008 Oklahoma tornadoes, NWS Birmingham, NWS Huntsville, NWS Memphis

=== May 11 event ===
List of reported tornadoes – Sunday, May 11, 2008
EF#	Location	County	Coord.	Time (UTC)	Path length	Damage
Alabama
EF1	Sunlight area	Walker		0527	9.3 miles (14.9 km)	Damage to several structures and numerous trees were snapped or uprooted
EF2	Colony area	Cullman, Walker		0537	13.3 miles (21 km)	Widespread tree damage across the area. Several chicken houses were destroyed.
EF1	Heflin	Cleburne		0736	4.2 miles (6.7 km)	Six structures were destroyed and 35 homes were damaged. Hundreds of trees were snapped or uprooted.
EF1	E of Heflin	Cleburne		0747	2.4 miles (3.9 km)	Several houses were heavily damaged with roofs blown off. Many trees were snapped.
Georgia
EF2	ENE of LaGrange	Troup	33°05′N 84°55′W	0808	1 miles (1.6 km)	One home was destroyed and three others were damaged
EF2	Jonesville	Carroll		0808	100 yds (90 m)	Brief spin-up tornado embedded in a derecho which blew two roofs off houses. Some damage to dorms of University of West Georgia.
EF2	SE of Hogansville	Troup, Meriwether		0818	4 miles (6.4 km)	The roof of a brick home was removed and a cinder block outbuilding and a shed were destroyed. Two trucks were destroyed and another house was damaged. Numerous trees were snapped or uprooted.
EF2	E of Jonesville	Carroll		0825	100 yds (90 m)	One home was destroyed, and several others had major roof damage..
EF2	NE of Morrow	Clayton, Henry, Rockdale, Newton	33°38′N 84°17′W	0917	19 miles (31 km)	One house heavily damaged just east of Interstate 675 with its second floor removed. Many other houses damaged.
EF2	Lizella/Macon	Bibb, Twiggs	32°50′N 83°40′W	0950	18 miles (29 km)	At least one house destroyed along Lake Tobesofkee. Extensive tree and power line damage. Two buildings destroyed at Macon State College. Many trees on the campus uprooted or snapped. Several other businesses and campus buildings damaged, including two commercial buildings that were destroyed along Eisenhower Parkway.
EF1	S of Toomsboro	Twiggs, Wilkinson		1015	25 miles (40 km)	A mobile home was heavily damaged and a church lost its roof along its long track.
EF2	Dublin area	Laurens	32°37′N 83°01′W	1036	14 miles (22.4 km)	2 deaths – One mobile home was destroyed, killing two occupants and injuring two others. Six houses were heavily damaged and many sheds and outbuildings were destroyed.
EF1	Wrightsville area	Laurens, Johnson		1044	10 miles (16 km)	Several houses were damaged and a mobile home was destroyed. 5 people were injured in Johnson County near Wrightsville.
EF0	N of Louisville	Washington, Jefferson, Burke		1045	33 miles (53 km)	Long track tornado with minor damage to many structures, and damaged many trees.
EF1	N of Lowery	Laurens		1058	9 miles (15 km)	A mobile home was destroyed and trees were snapped and uprooted.
EF2	Kite area	Johnson, Emanuel		1101	8 miles (13 km)	Numerous houses were damaged and mobile homes destroyed, primarily along US 221. 3 people were injured in Johnson County inside a destroyed mobile home north of Kite.
EF3	SE of Soperton	Treutlen, Montgomery		1111	7 miles (11.2 km)	Sheds and outbuildings were destroyed and one home lost its entire second story.
EF2	Normantown	Toombs		1120	1 miles (1.6 km)	Four mobile homes damaged, one home and one mobile home and one church were destroyed. Sheds and outbuildings were also destroyed. There were three injuries.
EF1	S of Millen	Jenkins	32°46′N 81°57′W	1133	1.7 miles (2.8 km)	Large wedge tornado; numerous trees and power lines were knocked down on Old West Savannah Road and Highway 25 South. Damage was reported to about 50 houses and two churches, where one person was injured.
EF3	Cobbtown area	Toombs, Emanuel, Candler, Tattnall	32°28′N 82°14′W	1135	7 miles (11 km)	Homes were damaged, trees and power lines were knocked down, and a convenience store was destroyed near Highway 23 and Highway 25. Two people suffered minor injuries.
EF1	SE of Nevils	Bulloch	32°16′N 81°45′W	1210	2.25 miles (3.6 km)	A mobile home was destroyed and another was heavily damaged, along with several farm buildings.
EF4	N of Darien	McIntosh	31°41′N 81°58′W	1352	11 miles (17 km)	See section on this tornado – Nine people were injured.
EF1	Sea Island	Glynn	31°18′N 81°38′W	1840	2 miles (3.2 km)	Tornado reported in the Sea Palms resort area. Many trees were snapped or uprooted, a few of which fell on buildings. No other building damage reported.
South Carolina
EF0	SE of Johnston	Edgefield	33°50′N 81°49′W	0809	unknown	Tornado reported between Edgefield and Johnston. Damage limited to trees and power lines.
EF0	NE of Baynham	Aiken		0831	3 miles (4.8 km)	No damage reported
EF0	SE of Ridge Spring	Aiken	33°48′N 81°37′W	0928	unknown	Damage limited to trees
EF0	WNW of Wagener	Aiken	33°42′N 81°29′W	1007	8 miles (12.8 km)	Weak tornado damaged a few trees.
EF0	SE of Varnville	Hampton		1230	unknown	Weak tornado with no damage
EF2	SW of Charleston	Charleston	32°43′N 80°14′W	2210	12 miles (20 km)	Large wedge tornado crossed Wadmalaw Island, Johns Island and James Island. The heaviest damage was on Wadmalaw Island, but damage was reported on all three islands.
Indiana
EF0	S of Markleville	Madison		1225	unknown	A trailer was carried away, one home had roof damage and numerous trees were damaged
Kentucky
EF1	Cumberland Falls State Park	McCreary, Whitley	36°50′N 84°20′W	1310	1.5 miles (2.4 km)	Many trees were knocked down in the park, one of which fell on a park ranger station.
EF1	Grahn Fork	Carter		1420	1.2 miles (2 km)	Several houses suffered structural damage, and a mobile home lost its roof.
EF1	E of Wooton	Leslie	37°18′N 83°29′W	1427	200 yds (180 m)	Heavy tree and power line damage as a result of a tornado in the area.
Ohio
EF0	NE of West Jefferson	Madison, Franklin	40°01′N 83°28′W	1710	300 yds (270 m)	Tornado reported according to CNN coverage. Narrow line of damage along Highway 142 with damage mainly to trees.
North Carolina
EF0	SE of Morganton	Burke		2030	unknown	Damage limited to trees
EF0	NE of Cat Square	Lincoln		2048	unknown	Brief touchdown in an open field
EF0	SE of Kirkland	New Hanover		2203	unknown	No damage reported
EF0	E of West Concord	Cabarrus		2219	unknown	Brief touchdown
EF2	NW of Lewiston to NW of Cremo	Bertie	36°14′N 77°19′W	2225	15 miles (24 km)	Tornado damaged several houses and destroyed some mobile homes and a church. Numerous trees knocked down. Two people were injured
EF2	SE of Maysville	Onslow, Jones		2257	5 miles (8 km)	Outbuildings were destroyed and several homes were heavily damaged. 6 people were injured.
EF0	NW of Morton Fork	Onslow		2328	unknown	No damage reported
EF1	Morehead City	Carteret	34°44′N 76°44′W	0006	3 miles (4.8 km)	Brief tornado knocked down some trees and flipped a trampoline. Minor damage to businesses also reported.
EF0	SW of Crab Point	Carteret		0017	unknown	Brief waterspout that moved onshore
EF1	N of Beaufort	Carteret		0027	unknown	Brief tornado touchdown
Sources: Storms Reports for May 11, 2008, NWS Peachtree City, NWS Wilmington, OH, NWS Jackson, KY, NWS Jacksonville, NWS Columbia, NWS Wakefield, NWS Newport/Morehead City, NWS Charleston, SC, NWS Charleston, WV

== See also ==
- Weather of 2008
- List of North American tornadoes and tornado outbreaks
- List of F4 and EF4 tornadoes
  - List of F4 and EF4 tornadoes (2000–2009)
- Tornadoes of 2008
