= Bison, Oklahoma =

- Census-designated place
- Location in Garfield County and the state of Oklahoma
- Coordinates: 36°11′45″N 97°53′52″W
- Country: United States
- State: Oklahoma
- County: Garfield

Area
  - Total: 1.06 sq mi (2.74 km^{2})
  - Land: 1.06 sq mi (2.74 km^{2})
  - Water: 0 sq mi (0.00 km^{2})
- Elevation: 1,217 ft (371 m)

Population (2020)
  - Total: 56
  - Density: 52.9/sq mi (20.41/km^{2})
- Time zone: UTC-6 (Central (CST))
  - Summer (DST): UTC-5 (CDT)
- ZIP code: 73720
- Area code: 580
- FIPS code: 40-06350
- GNIS feature ID: 2629907

Bison is an unincorporated community and census-designated place (CDP) located on US Highway 81 in Garfield County, Oklahoma, United States, consisting of a 30-acre (12 ha) town plat. As of the 2020 census, Bison had a population of 56.

The community was named for nearby Buffalo Springs, a historic stagecoach stop and a watering hole on the Chisholm Trail located about a mile north of Bison. Bison is home to a Catholic community, part of St. Joseph's parish under the Archdiocese of Oklahoma City. The church was erected in 1909, followed by a two-story brick school building operated by the Sisters of the Divine Providence from 1911 to 1934, when the Adorers of the Blood of Christ took over.

Bison's economy is agricultural and oil-based with oil wells on several farms and grain elevators by the Bison Cooperative Association, Star Mill and Burrus Mill companies. Bison was home to Bison State Bank from 1900 until 1933, when it closed due to the Great Depression. The Hotel Woodring was established in 1900 by Irvin and Ella Woodring, the parents of Irvin "Bertie" Woodring, for whom Enid Woodring Regional Airport is named. The post office opened on August 31, 1901. The Bison Mercantile Company was originally established as a grocery store by W.J. Scrichfield in 1900 and operated until 1958 when it was purchased by the Bison Cooperative Association. The co-op was established in 1920, the same year that Oklahoma Gas & Electric brought electricity to the town.

== Geography ==
Bison is located in southern Garfield County on the west side of US Highway 81, which leads north 14 miles (23 km) to Enid, the county seat, and south 6 miles (10 km) to Hennessey. According to the U.S. Census Bureau, the Bison CDP has an area of 1.06 square miles (2.74 km^{2}), all land.

=== Climate ===
Climate data for Bison, Oklahoma
Month	Jan	Feb	Mar	Apr	May	Jun	Jul	Aug	Sep	Oct	Nov	Dec	Year
Record high °F (°C)	81 (27)	90 (32)	98 (37)	100 (38)	100 (38)	106 (41)	113 (45)	115 (46)	110 (43)	99 (37)	88 (31)	84 (29)	115 (46)
Mean daily maximum °F (°C)	48 (9)	53 (12)	63 (17)	72 (22)	79 (26)	88 (31)	93 (34)	95 (35)	86 (30)	74 (23)	61 (16)	51 (11)	72 (22)
Mean daily minimum °F (°C)	26 (−3)	29 (−2)	37 (3)	48 (9)	57 (14)	66 (19)	70 (21)	69 (21)	61 (16)	49 (9)	37 (3)	28 (−2)	48 (9)
Record low °F (°C)	−17 (−27)	−18 (−28)	−5 (−21)	16 (−9)	29 (−2)	43 (6)	51 (11)	43 (6)	32 (0)	12 (−11)	7 (−14)	−6 (−21)	−18 (−28)
Average precipitation inches (mm)	1.1 (28)	1.3 (33)	2.1 (53)	3.5 (89)	4.8 (120)	4.1 (100)	3.1 (79)	3.1 (79)	3.6 (91)	2.9 (74)	2 (51)	1.4 (36)	33 (840)
Average snowfall inches (cm)	3.7 (9.4)	3.3 (8.4)	1.7 (4.3)	0 (0)	0 (0)	0 (0)	0 (0)	0 (0)	0 (0)	0 (0)	0.6 (1.5)	1.1 (2.8)	10.4 (26)
Source: Weatherbase.com

== Demographics ==
Historical population
Census	Pop.	Note	%±
2020	56		—
U.S. Decennial Census

=== 2020 census ===
As of the 2020 census, Bison had a population of 56. The median age was 44.0 years. 26.8% of residents were under the age of 18 and 35.7% of residents were 65 years of age or older. For every 100 females there were 180.0 males, and for every 100 females age 18 and over there were 173.3 males age 18 and over.

0.0% of residents lived in urban areas, while 100.0% lived in rural areas.

There were 19 households in Bison, of which 26.3% had children under the age of 18 living in them. Of all households, 57.9% were married-couple households, 21.1% were households with a male householder and no spouse or partner present, and 5.3% were households with a female householder and no spouse or partner present. About 10.6% of all households were made up of individuals and 5.3% had someone living alone who was 65 years of age or older.

There were 28 housing units, of which 32.1% were vacant. The homeowner vacancy rate was 0.0% and the rental vacancy rate was 25.0%.

Racial composition as of the 2020 census
Race	Number	Percent
White	47	83.9%
Black or African American	1	1.8%
American Indian and Alaska Native	1	1.8%
Asian	0	0.0%
Native Hawaiian and Other Pacific Islander	0	0.0%
Some other race	2	3.6%
Two or more races	5	8.9%
Hispanic or Latino (of any race)	3	5.4%

== Education ==
Its school district is Waukomis Public Schools.
