= Riga, Kansas =

Unincorporated community in Trego County, Kansas

- Unincorporated community
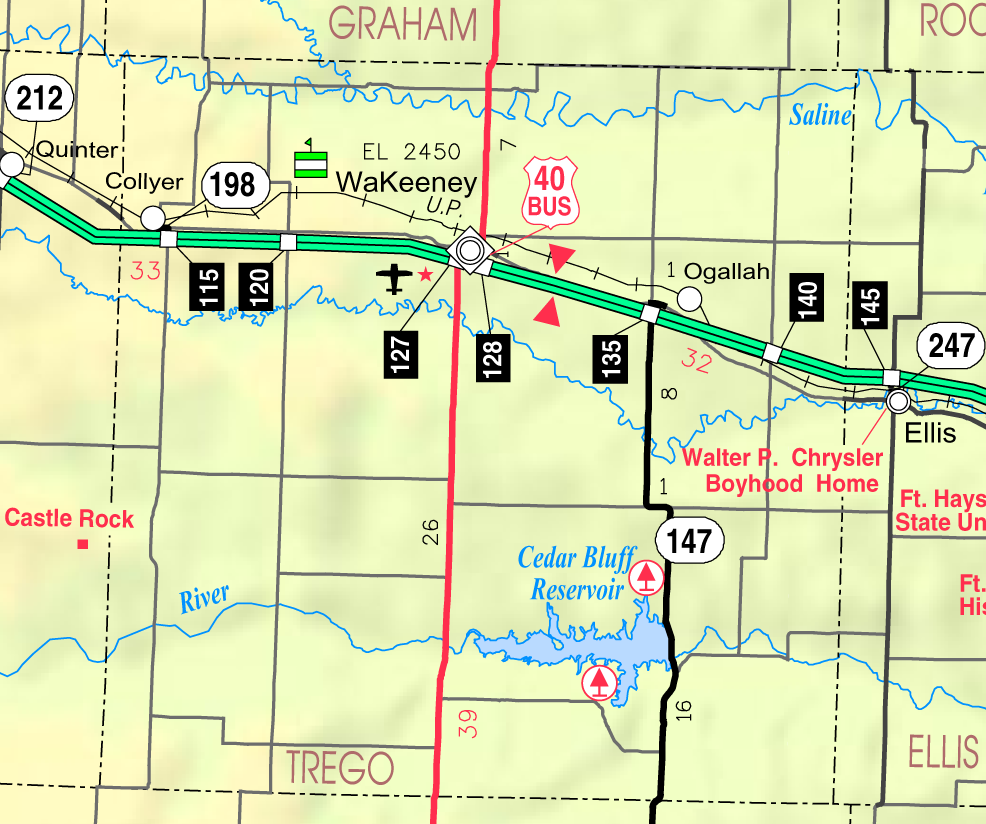
- KDOT map of Trego County (legend)

- Location within Kansas Location within the United States
- Coordinates: 38°57′2″N 99°39′1″W
- Country: United States
- State: Kansas
- County: Trego
- Township: Glencoe
- Elevation: 2,221 ft (677 m)
- Time zone: UTC-6 (CST)
  - Summer (DST): UTC-5 (CDT)
- ZIP Code: 67656
- Area code: 785
- FIPS code: 20-59850
- GNIS ID: 484721

Riga is an unincorporated community in Trego County, Kansas, United States.

== Geography ==
Riga is located at 39°06′12″N 99°14′44″W at an elevation of 2,221 feet (677 m). It is in far east-central Trego County, roughly 4 miles (6.4 km) west of Ellis in neighboring Ellis County It lies to the north of Big Creek in the western extent of the Smoky Hills region of the Great Plains.

== Transportation ==
=== Rail ===
- The Kansas Pacific (KP) line of the Union Pacific Railroad runs southeast–northwest through Riga, with a siding for the grain elevator.
  - Until 1946, Riga received scheduled local passenger service, at least twice daily; e.g., morning westbound train 69-369 and evening eastbound train 370-70.
    - However, there is recollection that, in the 1950s, the eastbound and westbound Portland Rose trains would meet at Riga.
    - In the 50s and 60s, the eastbound and westbound Portland Rose trains were scheduled to leave Oakley and Ellis, respectively, at about the same time in the early afternoon; and, would have to meet each other at a passing siding on the single track in between.
    - If the westbound was delayed in leaving Ellis, Riga was the last siding outside of Ellis where the eastbound could wait for the westbound to clear the station.
  - When the Union Pacific rebuilt the Kansas Pacific line in the late 1990s, a new 9300 ft. siding was built just west of Riga.

=== Highways ===
- Riga Road (FAS 1854) runs north–south through the location, connecting to Exit 140 of Interstate 70 one mile to the north.
  - The first section of Interstate 70 to be built in western Kansas was completed by 1961, from Riga to Collyer.
- 40 Hwy (FAS 1977), parallel to and south of the railroad tracks, an old alignment of U.S. Route 40, runs southeast–northwest through Riga and is a direct connection between the downtowns of WaKeeney (county seat) and Ellis.
