= Edwards County, Kansas =

County in Kansas, United States

- County
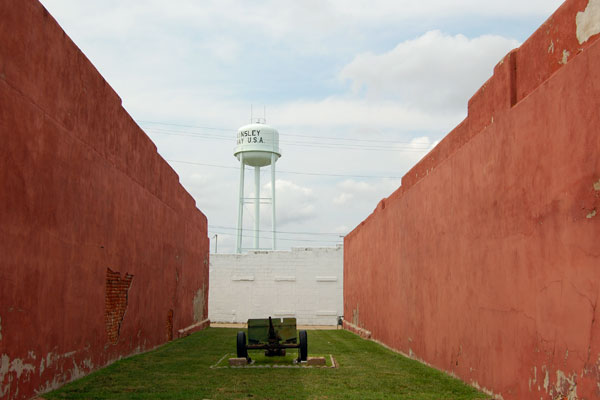
- Watertower in Kinsley (2009)

- Location within the U.S. state of Kansas
- Country: United States
- State: Kansas
- Founded: March 18, 1874
- Named for: W. C. Edwards
- Seat: Kinsley
- Largest city: Kinsley

Area
  - Total: 622 sq mi (1,610 km^{2})
  - Land: 622 sq mi (1,610 km^{2})
  - Water: 0.1 sq mi (0.26 km^{2}) 0.01%

Population (2020)
  - Total: 2,907
  - Estimate (2025): 2,640 ▼
  - Density: 4.7/sq mi (1.8/km^{2})
- Time zone: UTC−6 (Central)
  - Summer (DST): UTC−5 (CDT)
- Area code: 620
- Congressional district: 4th
- Website: edwardscountyks.org

Edwards County is a county located in the U.S. states of Kansas. Its county seat and most populous city is Kinsley. As of the 2020 census, the county population was 2,907, The county was founded in 1874 and named for W. C. Edwards, of Hutchinson, a pioneer settler who owned much land in the area.

== History ==
In 1873, Edwards County was established, and named for W. C. Edwards, of Hutchinson, a pioneer settler who owned much land in the area and built the first brick building in Kinsley.

N.C. Boles became the first postmaster in the county with the opening of the Peters post office at Kinsley, then known as Petersboro, in 1873. Kinsley's present name honors E.W. Kinsley, a Bostonian who generously funded the construction of the first church edifice, a Congregationalist building completed in 1875.

The infamous grasshopper raid of 1874 decimated crops, leaving many residents without means to sustain themselves. The county commissioners petitioned Governor Osborn for aid, emphasizing the plight of families and advocating for work programs over handouts.

In its first decade, Kinsley suffered two planned train robberies, as well as a bank robbery on December 9, 1882. The County Treasurer, J. W. Crawford, was implicated in the bank robbery and removed from office.

== Geography ==
According to the U.S. Census Bureau, the county has a total area of 622 square miles (1,610 km^{2}), of which 622 square miles (1,610 km^{2}) is land and 0.1 square miles (0.26 km^{2}) (0.01%) is water.

=== Geographic features ===
The Arkansas River flows through Edwards County from the southwest corner to the Pawnee County line near U.S. Route 56.

=== Major highways ===
Three U.S. Routes run through Edwards County, all meeting in Kinsley. An east–west route, U.S. Route 50 circumvents Belpre and Lewis before joining with westbound U.S. Route 56 in Kinsley. The single road then passes through Offerle and west into Ford County. U.S. Route 183 runs from Kiowa County in the south to Kinsley, where it joins eastbound U.S. 56, running as a single highway to Pawnee County. K-19 starts at U.S. Route 50 near Belpre, and travels north into Pawnee County.

=== Adjacent counties ===
- Pawnee County (north)
- Stafford County (east)
- Pratt County (southeast)
- Kiowa County (south)
- Ford County (southwest)
- Hodgeman County (northwest)

== Demographics ==
Historical population
Census	Pop.	Note	%±
1880	2,409		—
1890	3,600		49.4%
1900	3,682		2.3%
1910	7,033		91.0%
1920	7,057		0.3%
1930	7,295		3.4%
1940	6,377		−12.6%
1950	5,936		−6.9%
1960	5,118		−13.8%
1970	4,581		−10.5%
1980	4,271		−6.8%
1990	3,787		−11.3%
2000	3,449		−8.9%
2010	3,037		−11.9%
2020	2,907		−4.3%
2025 (est.)	2,640	▼	−9.2%
U.S. Decennial Census; 1790-1960 1900-1990; 1990-2000 2010-2020

=== Racial and ethnic composition ===
Edwards County, Kansas – Racial and ethnic composition Note: the US Census treats Hispanic/Latino as an ethnic category. This table excludes Latinos from the racial categories and assigns them to a separate category. Hispanics/Latinos may be of any race.
Race / Ethnicity (NH = Non-Hispanic)	Pop 1980	Pop 1990	Pop 2000	Pop 2010	Pop 2020	% 1980	% 1990	% 2000	% 2010	% 2020
White alone (NH)	4,071	3,566	3,068	2,446	2,157	95.32%	94.16%	88.95%	80.54%	74.20%
Black or African American alone (NH)	4	4	9	5	14	0.09%	0.11%	0.26%	0.16%	0.48%
Native American or Alaska Native alone (NH)	8	12	12	11	15	0.19%	0.32%	0.35%	0.36%	0.52%
Asian alone (NH)	8	8	11	12	1	0.19%	0.21%	0.32%	0.40%	0.03%
Native Hawaiian or Pacific Islander alone (NH)	x	x	0	0	1	x	x	0.00%	0.00%	0.03%
Other race alone (NH)	5	0	0	1	2	0.12%	0.00%	0.00%	0.03%	0.07%
Mixed race or Multiracial (NH)	x	x	14	28	94	x	x	0.41%	0.92%	3.23%
Hispanic or Latino (any race)	175	197	335	534	623	4.10%	5.20%	9.71%	17.58%	21.43%
Total	4,271	3,787	3,449	3,037	2,907	100.00%	100.00%	100.00%	100.00%	100.00%

=== 2020 census ===
As of the 2020 census, the county had a population of 2,907 and a median age of 45.7 years; 22.2% of residents were under the age of 18, 22.9% were 65 years of age or older, and for every 100 females there were 101.7 males (99.3 males for every 100 females age 18 and over). No residents lived in urban areas while 100.0% lived in rural areas.

The racial makeup of the county was 82.6% White, 0.5% Black or African American, 0.6% American Indian and Alaska Native, 0.1% Asian, 0.0% Native Hawaiian and Pacific Islander, 7.3% from some other race, and 9.0% from two or more races, while Hispanic or Latino residents of any race comprised 21.4% of the population.

There were 1,257 households in the county, of which 28.4% had children under the age of 18 living with them and 22.1% had a female householder with no spouse or partner present; 31.5% of all households were made up of individuals and 14.9% had someone living alone who was 65 years of age or older.

There were 1,550 housing units, of which 18.9% were vacant. Among occupied housing units, 75.6% were owner-occupied and 24.4% were renter-occupied. The homeowner vacancy rate was 1.6% and the rental vacancy rate was 14.9%.

=== 2000 census ===
As of the 2000 census, there were 3,449 people, 1,455 households, and 955 families residing in the county. The population density was 6 people per square mile (2.3 people/km^{2}). There were 1,754 housing units at an average density of 3 per square mile (1.2/km^{2}). The racial makeup of the county was 92.52% White, 0.32% Black or African American, 0.49% Native American, 0.32% Asian, 5.57% from other races, and 0.78% from two or more races. Hispanic or Latino of any race were 9.71% of the population.

There were 1,455 households, out of which 28.70% had children under the age of 18 living with them, 56.30% were married couples living together, 6.00% had a female householder with no husband present, and 34.30% were non-families. 32.00% of all households were made up of individuals, and 17.30% had someone living alone who was 65 years of age or older. The average household size was 2.33 and the average family size was 2.94.

In the county, the population was spread out, with 24.60% under the age of 18, 6.70% from 18 to 24, 25.10% from 25 to 44, 22.80% from 45 to 64, and 20.80% who were 65 years of age or older. The median age was 41 years. For every 100 females there were 97.50 males. For every 100 females age 18 and over, there were 95.80 males.

The median income for a household in the county was $30,530, and the median income for a family was $38,250. Males had a median income of $27,050 versus $20,132 for females. The per capita income for the county was $17,586. About 7.00% of families and 10.40% of the population were below the poverty line, including 14.40% of those under age 18 and 8.00% of those age 65 or over.

== Government ==
=== Presidential elections ===
Presidential election results

United States presidential election results for Edwards County, Kansas
Year	Republican		Democratic		Third party(ies)	
Year	No.	%	No.	%	No.	%
1888	541	53.62%	334	33.10%	134	13.28%
1892	399	45.55%	0	0.00%	477	54.45%
1896	322	39.85%	479	59.28%	7	0.87%
1900	523	50.10%	502	48.08%	19	1.82%
1904	816	64.30%	328	25.85%	125	9.85%
1908	773	50.23%	704	45.74%	62	4.03%
1912	276	16.05%	764	44.42%	680	39.53%
1916	1,158	40.80%	1,431	50.42%	249	8.77%
1920	1,782	70.16%	681	26.81%	77	3.03%
1924	1,929	66.98%	548	19.03%	403	13.99%
1928	2,171	73.37%	768	25.95%	20	0.68%
1932	1,420	44.40%	1,693	52.94%	85	2.66%
1936	1,394	41.21%	1,986	58.71%	3	0.09%
1940	1,886	60.14%	1,219	38.87%	31	0.99%
1944	1,669	65.09%	876	34.17%	19	0.74%
1948	1,627	58.15%	1,083	38.71%	88	3.15%
1952	2,192	76.40%	647	22.55%	30	1.05%
1956	1,816	69.93%	771	29.69%	10	0.39%
1960	1,588	61.46%	986	38.16%	10	0.39%
1964	932	39.21%	1,427	60.03%	18	0.76%
1968	1,243	54.90%	832	36.75%	189	8.35%
1972	1,534	64.54%	757	31.85%	86	3.62%
1976	1,001	42.47%	1,304	55.32%	52	2.21%
1980	1,409	63.93%	616	27.95%	179	8.12%
1984	1,352	67.53%	606	30.27%	44	2.20%
1988	993	53.88%	792	42.97%	58	3.15%
1992	769	39.95%	567	29.45%	589	30.60%
1996	1,088	59.94%	539	29.70%	188	10.36%
2000	1,062	67.95%	447	28.60%	54	3.45%
2004	1,084	72.46%	386	25.80%	26	1.74%
2008	995	73.32%	333	24.54%	29	2.14%
2012	1,059	76.46%	298	21.52%	28	2.02%
2016	1,037	78.62%	212	16.07%	70	5.31%
2020	1,141	79.73%	271	18.94%	19	1.33%
2024	1,042	82.11%	213	16.78%	14	1.10%

=== Laws ===
Edwards County was a prohibition, or "dry", county until the Kansas Constitution was amended in 1986 and voters approved the sale of alcoholic liquor by the individual drink with a 30% food sales requirement.

== Education ==
=== Unified school districts ===
- Kinsley-Offerle USD 347
- Lewis USD 502

== Communities ==
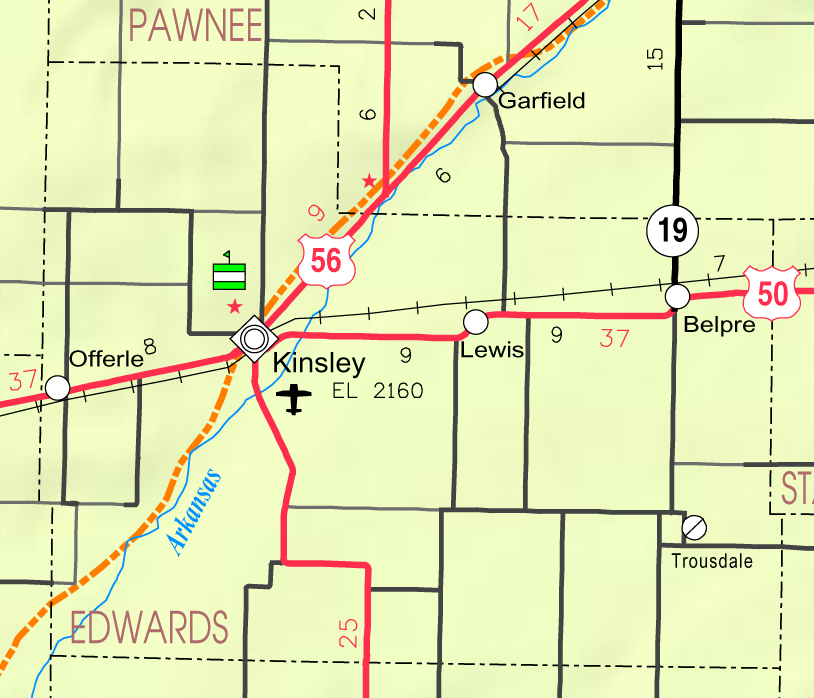
2005 map of Edwards County (map legend)

List of townships / incorporated cities / unincorporated communities / extinct former communities within Edwards County.

=== Cities ===
- Belpre
- Kinsley (county seat)
- Lewis
- Offerle

=== Unincorporated communities ===
- Centerview
- Fellsburg
- Nettleton
- Trousdale

=== Townships ===
Edwards County is divided into ten townships. The city of Kinsley is considered governmentally independent and is excluded from the census figures for the townships. In the following table, the population center is the largest city (or cities) included in that township's population total, if it is of a significant size.

Township	FIPS	Population center	Population	Population density /km^{2} (/sq mi)	Land area km^{2} (sq mi)	Water area km^{2} (sq mi)	Water %	Geographic coordinates
Belpre	05850		186	1 (3)	140 (54)	0 (0)	0.01%	37°57′14″N 99°6′12″W
Franklin	24350		93	0 (1)	191 (74)	0 (0)	0%	37°48′55″N 99°11′12″W
Jackson	34750		98	1 (1)	187 (72)	0 (0)	0.05%	37°59′35″N 99°30′18″W
Kinsley	37100		160	1 (3)	121 (47)	0 (0)	0.01%	37°56′27″N 99°24′0″W
Lincoln	40650		143	1 (2)	193 (74)	0 (0)	0%	37°49′17″N 99°4′39″W
Logan	41875		42	0 (1)	93 (36)	0 (0)	0%	38°3′5″N 99°23′47″W
North Brown	51100		67	0 (1)	163 (63)	0 (0)	0.05%	37°51′43″N 99°21′34″W
South Brown	66550		90	0 (1)	251 (97)	0 (0)	0%	37°47′5″N 99°22′5″W
Trenton	71400		306	2 (6)	136 (53)	0 (0)	0%	37°52′50″N 99°32′31″W
Wayne	76125		606	5 (12)	132 (51)	0 (0)	0%	37°56′28″N 99°15′30″W
Sources: "Census 2000 U.S. Gazetteer Files". U.S. Census Bureau, Geography Division. Archived from the original on August 2, 2002.

== See also ==
Community information for Kansas

- Kansas locations by per capita income
- List of counties in Kansas
- List of townships in Kansas
- List of cities in Kansas
- List of unincorporated communities in Kansas
- List of ghost towns in Kansas
