= Baldridge, Texas =

Ghost town in Texas, US

Baldridge
- Ghost town
- Location in Texas
- Coordinates: 31.0279274°N 102.6204251°W
- Country: United States
- State: Texas
- County: Pecos
- Elevation: 2,530 ft (770 m)
- USGS Feature ID: 1381362

Baldridge is a ghost town in Pecos County, Texas, United States. Named for its geography, it was founded at a station on the Atchison, Topeka and Santa Fe Railway, as well as the Kansas City, Mexico and Orient Railway from 1913. It peaked in the late 1930s, with around 200 residents and two businesses. Most left following World War II, and by the 1950s, was abandoned.
