= Kinsley, Kansas =

City in Edwards County, Kansas

- City and County seat
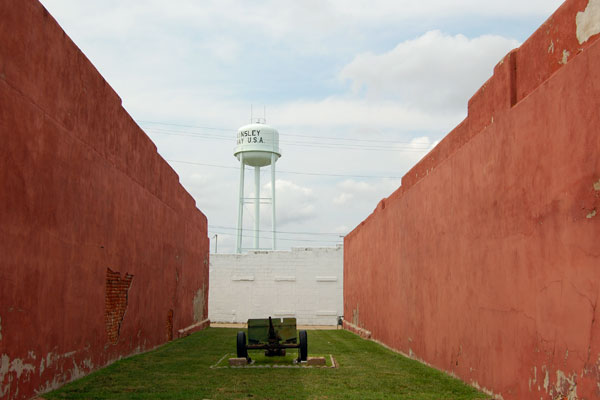
- Water tower (2008)

- Location within County and Kansas

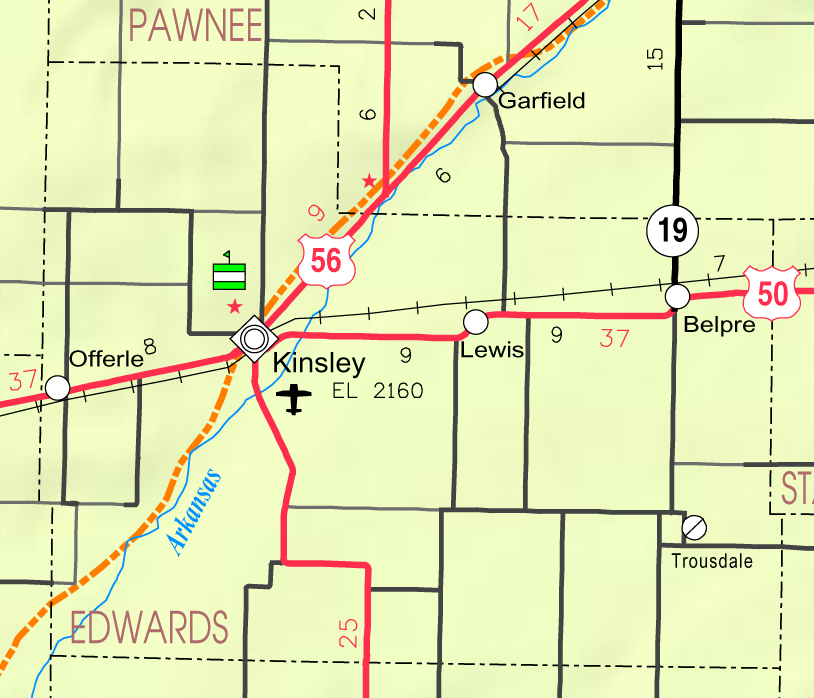
- KDOT map of Edwards County (legend)
- Coordinates: 37°55′21″N 99°24′41″W
- Country: United States
- State: Kansas
- County: Edwards
- Founded: 1870s
- Platted: 1873
- Incorporated: 1878
- Named for: E.W. Kinsley

Area
  - Total: 1.30 sq mi (3.36 km^{2})
  - Land: 1.30 sq mi (3.36 km^{2})
  - Water: 0 sq mi (0.00 km^{2})
- Elevation: 2,169 ft (661 m)

Population (2020)
  - Total: 1,456
  - Density: 1,120/sq mi (433/km^{2})
- Time zone: UTC-6 (CST)
  - Summer (DST): UTC-5 (CDT)
- ZIP Code: 67547
- Area code: 620
- FIPS code: 20-37075
- GNIS ID: 485603
- Website: cityofkinsley.org

Kinsley is a city in and the county seat of Edwards County, Kansas, United States. As of the 2020 census, the population of the city was 1,456. It is located along Highway 50.

== History ==
The community was originally called Petersburg, and under the latter name laid out in 1873. It was later renamed Peter's City. The majority of the community's first residents were from New England, especially Massachusetts, and were originally drawn by the New England Homestead and Colonization Bureau, and it was called the "New England colony" or "Massachusetts colony." In 1873, the settlement was renamed Kinsley after the Boston capitalist Edward Wilkinson Kinsley, who agreed to build a church if the community was named after him.

The first post office in Kinsley was established under the name Peters in April 1873. The post office was renamed Kinsley in January 1874.

== Geography ==
According to the United States Census Bureau, the city has a total area of 1.29 square miles (3.34 km^{2}), all land.

Kinsley is approximately 35 miles (56 km) east of Dodge City.

=== Climate ===
The climate in this area is characterized by hot, humid summers and generally mild to cool winters. According to the Köppen Climate Classification system, Kinsley has a humid subtropical climate, abbreviated "Cfa" on climate maps.

Climate data for Kinsley, Kansas, 1991–2020 normals, extremes 1949–2009
Month	Jan	Feb	Mar	Apr	May	Jun	Jul	Aug	Sep	Oct	Nov	Dec	Year
Record high °F (°C)	80 (27)	88 (31)	92 (33)	99 (37)	103 (39)	110 (43)	111 (44)	110 (43)	106 (41)	98 (37)	90 (32)	85 (29)	111 (44)
Mean daily maximum °F (°C)	45.9 (7.7)	49.2 (9.6)	59.5 (15.3)	68.4 (20.2)	77.6 (25.3)	88.2 (31.2)	92.7 (33.7)	91.3 (32.9)	83.3 (28.5)	71.9 (22.2)	58.3 (14.6)	47.1 (8.4)	69.4 (20.8)
Daily mean °F (°C)	32.1 (0.1)	35.4 (1.9)	44.9 (7.2)	53.9 (12.2)	64.0 (17.8)	74.5 (23.6)	79.2 (26.2)	77.9 (25.5)	69.5 (20.8)	56.8 (13.8)	43.8 (6.6)	33.6 (0.9)	55.5 (13.1)
Mean daily minimum °F (°C)	18.3 (−7.6)	21.6 (−5.8)	30.3 (−0.9)	39.4 (4.1)	50.3 (10.2)	60.8 (16.0)	65.7 (18.7)	64.4 (18.0)	55.7 (13.2)	41.7 (5.4)	29.3 (−1.5)	20.2 (−6.6)	41.5 (5.3)
Record low °F (°C)	−15 (−26)	−18 (−28)	−7 (−22)	12 (−11)	28 (−2)	40 (4)	46 (8)	42 (6)	21 (−6)	14 (−10)	−4 (−20)	−19 (−28)	−19 (−28)
Average precipitation inches (mm)	0.62 (16)	0.75 (19)	1.78 (45)	2.51 (64)	3.75 (95)	3.57 (91)	3.85 (98)	3.53 (90)	2.13 (54)	2.34 (59)	0.97 (25)	0.95 (24)	26.75 (680)
Average snowfall inches (cm)	4.7 (12)	2.9 (7.4)	3.1 (7.9)	0.6 (1.5)	0.0 (0.0)	0.0 (0.0)	0.0 (0.0)	0.0 (0.0)	0.0 (0.0)	0.0 (0.0)	0.5 (1.3)	3.3 (8.4)	15.1 (38.5)
Average precipitation days (≥ 0.01 in)	2.3	3.0	4.1	6.2	6.3	7.3	7.0	6.0	4.8	4.6	3.0	3.2	57.8
Average snowy days (≥ 0.1 in)	1.5	1.2	0.9	0.3	0.0	0.0	0.0	0.0	0.0	0.1	0.3	1.2	5.5
Source 1: NOAA
Source 2: XMACIS2

== Demographics ==
Historical population
Census	Pop.	Note	%±
1880	457		—
1890	771		68.7%
1900	780		1.2%
1910	1,547		98.3%
1920	1,986		28.4%
1930	2,270		14.3%
1940	2,178		−4.1%
1950	2,479		13.8%
1960	2,263		−8.7%
1970	2,212		−2.3%
1980	2,074		−6.2%
1990	1,875		−9.6%
2000	1,658		−11.6%
2010	1,457		−12.1%
2020	1,456		−0.1%
U.S. Decennial Census

=== 2020 census ===
The 2020 United States census counted 1,456 people, 660 households, and 378 families in Kinsley. The population density was 1,123.5 per square mile (433.8/km^{2}). There were 813 housing units at an average density of 627.3 per square mile (242.2/km^{2}). The racial makeup was 83.38% (1,214) white or European American (75.96% non-Hispanic white), 0.76% (11) black or African-American, 0.41% (6) Native American or Alaska Native, 0.07% (1) Asian, 0.0% (0) Pacific Islander or Native Hawaiian, 5.98% (87) from other races, and 9.41% (137) from two or more races. Hispanic or Latino of any race was 19.09% (278) of the population.

Of the 660 households, 26.5% had children under the age of 18; 42.9% were married couples living together; 29.5% had a female householder with no spouse or partner present. 38.3% of households consisted of individuals and 18.8% had someone living alone who was 65 years of age or older. The average household size was 2.1 and the average family size was 2.7. The percent of those with a bachelor's degree or higher was estimated to be 14.5% of the population.

22.5% of the population was under the age of 18, 6.2% from 18 to 24, 20.6% from 25 to 44, 27.7% from 45 to 64, and 23.0% who were 65 years of age or older. The median age was 45.5 years. For every 100 females, there were 107.1 males. For every 100 females ages 18 and older, there were 112.8 males.

The 2016–2020 5-year American Community Survey estimates show that the median household income was $49,158 (with a margin of error of +/- $3,023) and the median family income was $54,656 (+/- $12,421). Males had a median income of $34,861 (+/- $8,195) versus $31,750 (+/- $9,882) for females. The median income for those above 16 years old was $33,047 (+/- $3,912). Approximately, 9.9% of families and 9.9% of the population were below the poverty line, including 3.5% of those under the age of 18 and 13.1% of those ages 65 or over.

=== 2010 census ===
As of the census of 2010, there were 1,457 people, 654 households, and 384 families residing in the city. The population density was 1,129.5 inhabitants per square mile (436.1/km^{2}). There were 813 housing units at an average density of 630.2 per square mile (243.3/km^{2}). The racial makeup of the city was 93.1% White, 0.8% African American, 0.3% Native American, 0.8% Asian, 3.4% from other races, and 1.6% from two or more races. Hispanic or Latino of any race were 14.7% of the population.

There were 654 households, of which 26.6% had children under the age of 18 living with them, 46.5% were married couples living together, 8.1% had a female householder with no husband present, 4.1% had a male householder with no wife present, and 41.3% were non-families. 37.9% of all households were made up of individuals, and 17.7% had someone living alone who was 65 years of age or older. The average household size was 2.17 and the average family size was 2.86.

The median age in the city was 44.5 years. 23.5% of residents were under the age of 18; 5.5% were between the ages of 18 and 24; 21.7% were from 25 to 44; 28.7% were from 45 to 64; and 20.5% were 65 years of age or older. The gender makeup of the city was 48.2% male and 51.8% female.

== Area attractions ==
- Edwards County Historical Sod House and Museum.
- Carnival Heritage Center & Museum, 200 E 6th.
- Half Way Sign. The sign says the distances to San Francisco and New York City are identical at 1,561 miles (2,512 km).

== Education ==
The community is served by Kinsley–Offerle USD 347 public school district.

== Transportation ==
U.S. Route 50 passes through Kinsley.

== Notable people ==
- Madge Blake, (1899–1969), actress (Batman)
- Kyle Burkhart, former NFL/CFL offensive lineman
- Freedy Johnston, singer/songwriter
- Peter Mehringer, men's freestyle wrestling gold medal at 1932 Summer Olympics.
- Earl Winfield Spencer Jr., first commanding officer of Naval Air Station, San Diego, California, and first husband of Wallis, Duchess of Windsor

== See also ==
- Santa Fe Trail
