= Haywood, Oklahoma =

Haywood
- Unincorporated community and Census designated place
- Location within the state of Oklahoma Haywood (the United States)
- Coordinates: 34°53′31″N 95°57′07″W
- Country: United States
- State: Oklahoma
- County: Pittsburg

Area
  - Total: 2.08 sq mi (5.38 km^{2})
  - Land: 2.08 sq mi (5.38 km^{2})
  - Water: 0 sq mi (0.00 km^{2})
- Elevation: 797 ft (243 m)

Population (2020)
  - Total: 150
  - Density: 72.2/sq mi (27.86/km^{2})
- Time zone: UTC-6 (Central (CST))
  - Summer (DST): UTC-5 (CDT)
- FIPS code: 40-33250
- GNIS feature ID: 2805320

Haywood is an unincorporated community in Pittsburg County, Oklahoma, United States. As of the 2020 census, Haywood had a population of 150. A post office was established at Haywood, Indian Territory on September 20, 1904. The community, located in a coal mining region, was named for William D. "Big Bill" Haywood, a prominent socialist and labor leader of the era. At the time of its founding, Haywood was located in Tobucksy County, Choctaw Nation.

The north entrance to the McAlester Army Ammunition Plant is located in Haywood.

== Demographics ==
Historical population
Census	Pop.	Note	%±
2020	150		—
U.S. Decennial Census

=== 2020 census ===
As of the 2020 census, Haywood had a population of 150. The median age was 37.5 years. 28.7% of residents were under the age of 18 and 20.0% of residents were 65 years of age or older. For every 100 females there were 100.0 males, and for every 100 females age 18 and over there were 78.3 males age 18 and over.

0.0% of residents lived in urban areas, while 100.0% lived in rural areas.

There were 56 households in Haywood, of which 30.4% had children under the age of 18 living in them. Of all households, 42.9% were married-couple households, 32.1% were households with a male householder and no spouse or partner present, and 12.5% were households with a female householder and no spouse or partner present. About 30.4% of all households were made up of individuals and 23.2% had someone living alone who was 65 years of age or older.

There were 70 housing units, of which 20.0% were vacant. The homeowner vacancy rate was 3.6% and the rental vacancy rate was 22.2%.

Racial composition as of the 2020 census
Race	Number	Percent
White	105	70.0%
Black or African American	0	0.0%
American Indian and Alaska Native	22	14.7%
Asian	0	0.0%
Native Hawaiian and Other Pacific Islander	0	0.0%
Some other race	2	1.3%
Two or more races	21	14.0%
Hispanic or Latino (of any race)	3	2.0%
