= Offerle, Kansas =

City in Edwards County, Kansas

- City
- Location within County and Kansas

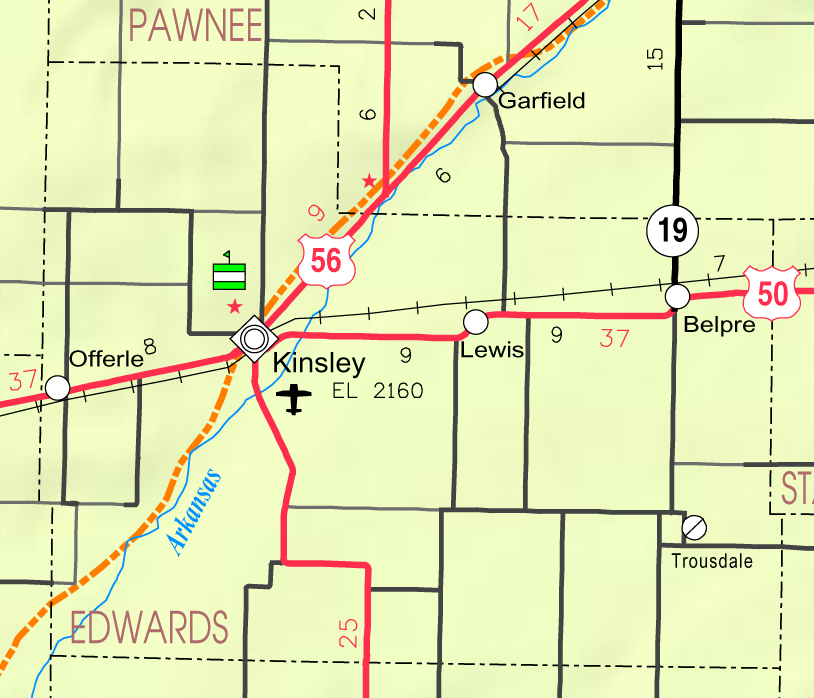
- KDOT map of Edwards County (legend)
- Coordinates: 37°53′27″N 99°33′37″W
- Country: United States
- State: Kansas
- County: Edwards
- Founded: 1876
- Incorporated: 1917
- Named for: Lawrence Offerle

Area
  - Total: 0.27 sq mi (0.71 km^{2})
  - Land: 0.27 sq mi (0.71 km^{2})
  - Water: 0 sq mi (0.00 km^{2})
- Elevation: 2,267 ft (691 m)

Population (2020)
  - Total: 179
  - Density: 650/sq mi (250/km^{2})
- Time zone: UTC-6 (CST)
  - Summer (DST): UTC-5 (CDT)
- ZIP Code: 67563
- Area code: 620
- FIPS code: 20-52200
- GNIS ID: 2395304
- Website: City website

Offerle is a city in Edwards County, Kansas, United States. As of the 2020 census, the population of the city was 179. It is located along Highway 50.

== History ==
Offerle was founded in 1876. It was named for Lawrence Offerle, one of its founders.

The first post office in Offerle was established in May 1876.

== Geography ==
According to the United States Census Bureau, the city has a total area of 0.26 square miles (0.67 km^{2}), all land.

=== Climate ===
The climate in this area is characterized by hot, humid summers and generally mild to cool winters. According to the Köppen Climate Classification system, Offerle has a humid subtropical climate, abbreviated "Cfa" on climate maps.

== Demographics ==
Historical population
Census	Pop.	Note	%±
1920	225		—
1930	298		32.4%
1940	273		−8.4%
1950	269		−1.5%
1960	208		−22.7%
1970	212		1.9%
1980	244		15.1%
1990	228		−6.6%
2000	220		−3.5%
2010	199		−9.5%
2020	179		−10.1%
U.S. Decennial Census

=== 2020 census ===
The 2020 United States census counted 179 people, 80 households, and 54 families in Offerle. The population density was 650.9 per square mile (251.3/km^{2}). There were 87 housing units at an average density of 316.4 per square mile (122.1/km^{2}). The racial makeup was 79.89% (143) white or European American (77.09% non-Hispanic white), 0.56% (1) black or African-American, 1.12% (2) Native American or Alaska Native, 0.0% (0) Asian, 0.0% (0) Pacific Islander or Native Hawaiian, 5.59% (10) from other races, and 12.85% (23) from two or more races. Hispanic or Latino of any race was 16.76% (30) of the population.

Of the 80 households, 28.7% had children under the age of 18; 60.0% were married couples living together; 12.5% had a female householder with no spouse or partner present. 30.0% of households consisted of individuals and 15.0% had someone living alone who was 65 years of age or older. The average household size was 2.5 and the average family size was 3.0. The percent of those with a bachelor's degree or higher was estimated to be 26.3% of the population.

24.0% of the population was under the age of 18, 3.9% from 18 to 24, 25.7% from 25 to 44, 26.8% from 45 to 64, and 19.6% who were 65 years of age or older. The median age was 41.5 years. For every 100 females, there were 110.6 males. For every 100 females ages 18 and older, there were 103.0 males.

The 2016–2020 5-year American Community Survey estimates show that the median household income was $56,250 (with a margin of error of +/- $15,915) and the median family income was $62,917 (+/- $32,748). Males had a median income of $47,679 (+/- $23,623) versus $22,083 (+/- $6,013) for females. The median income for those above 16 years old was $31,324 (+/- $4,366). Approximately, 1.2% of families and 5.5% of the population were below the poverty line, including 5.3% of those under the age of 18 and 3.9% of those ages 65 or over.

=== 2010 census ===
As of the census of 2010, there were 199 people, 83 households, and 58 families residing in the city. The population density was 765.4 inhabitants per square mile (295.5/km^{2}). There were 92 housing units at an average density of 353.8 per square mile (136.6/km^{2}). The racial makeup of the city was 91.5% White, 3.0% Native American, and 5.5% from other races. Hispanic or Latino of any race were 13.6% of the population.

There were 83 households, of which 27.7% had children under the age of 18 living with them, 65.1% were married couples living together, 1.2% had a female householder with no husband present, 3.6% had a male householder with no wife present, and 30.1% were non-families. 25.3% of all households were made up of individuals, and 10.8% had someone living alone who was 65 years of age or older. The average household size was 2.40 and the average family size was 2.91.

The median age in the city was 43.4 years. 23.6% of residents were under the age of 18; 4.9% were between the ages of 18 and 24; 23.5% were from 25 to 44; 30.5% were from 45 to 64; and 17.1% were 65 years of age or older. The gender makeup of the city was 45.2% male and 54.8% female.

== Education ==
Offerle is served by USD 347 Kinsley-Offerle Public Schools.

The Kinsley-Offerle Middle School mascot is the Wolverines. The Kinsley-Offerle High School mascot is the Coyotes.

Offerle High School was closed through school unification. The Offerle High School mascot was the Indians.
