= St. John Township, Kansas =

Township in Stafford County, Kansas, U.S.

St. John Township
- Township
- Location within Stafford County
- Coordinates: 38.036556°N 98.753308°W
- Country: United States
- State: Kansas
- County: Stafford
- Established: 1879

Government
  - Trustee: Roger Dick

Area
  - Total: 36.316 sq mi (94.06 km^{2})
  - Land: 36.292 sq mi (94.00 km^{2})
  - Water: 0.024 sq mi (0.062 km^{2}) 0.07%

Population (2020)
  - Total: 975
  - Density: 26.9/sq mi (10.4/km^{2})
- Time zone: UTC-6 (CST)
  - Summer (DST): UTC-5 (CDT)
- Area code: 620
- GNIS feature ID: 473576

St. John Township is a township in Stafford County, Kansas, United States. As of the 2020 census, its population was 975.

== History ==
St. John Township was created on July 14, 1879. Cleveland Township was eventually created from part of St. John Township.

== Geography ==
St. John Township covers an area of 36.449 square miles (94.06 square kilometers). Rattlesnake Creek flows through it.

=== Communities ===
- part of St. John

=== Adjacent townships ===
South Seward Township, Stafford County
Douglas Township, Stafford County	northwest	north	northeast	Hayes Township, Stafford County
Cleveland Township, Stafford County	west	self	east	West Cooper Township, Stafford County
Richland Township, Stafford County	southwest	south	southeast	Stafford Township, Stafford County
Ohio Township, Stafford County

== Transportation ==
=== Major highways ===
- US-281

== Demographics ==
As of the 2020 census, there were 975 people and 359 households residing in the township. The population density was 26.9 people per square mile (10.4 people/km^{2}). There were 434 housing units. The racial makeup of the township was 82.8% White, 1.0% Native American, 0.2% Black or African American, 5.7% from some other race, and 10.3% from two or more races. Hispanics or Latinos of any race were 16.6% of the population.

There were 359 households: 57.7% were married couples living together, 14.2% had a male householder with no spouse present, and 24.8% had a female householder with no spouse present. The average family size was 3.43 people. 38.7% of people in the township older than 24 had a college degree, and the township had an employment rate of 63.6%.
