= Albano Township, Kansas =

Township in Stafford County, Kansas, U.S.

Albano Township
- Township
- Location within Stafford County
- Coordinates: 37.861711°N 98.866756°W
- Country: United States
- State: Kansas
- County: Stafford

Government
  - Trustee: Craig Fisher

Area
  - Total: 36.274 sq mi (93.95 km^{2})
  - Land: 36.274 sq mi (93.95 km^{2})
  - Water: 0 sq mi (0 km^{2}) 0%

Population (2020)
  - Total: 28
  - Density: 0.77/sq mi (0.30/km^{2})
- Time zone: UTC-6 (CST)
  - Summer (DST): UTC-5 (CDT)
- Area code: 620
- GNIS feature ID: 473567

Albano Township is a township in Stafford County, Kansas, United States. As of the 2020 census, its population was 28.

== History ==
Albano Township was created from part of Clear Creek Township.

== Geography ==
Albano Township covers an area of 36.274 square miles (93.95 square kilometers). Rattlesnake Creek flows through it.

=== Adjacent townships ===
Richland Township, Stafford County
Farmington Township, Stafford County	northwest	north	northeast	Ohio Township, Stafford County
Clear Creek Township, Stafford County	west	self	east	Rose Valley Township, Stafford County
		south
Township 8, Pratt County

== Demographics ==
As of the 2020 census, there were 28 people and 13 households residing in the township. The population density was 0.77 people per square mile (0.30 people/km^{2}). There were 13 housing units. The racial makeup of the township was 96.4% White, and 3.6% from two or more races. Hispanics or Latinos of any race were 10.7% of the population.

There were 13 households: 15.4% were married couples living together, 76.9% were female householders with no spouse present, and 7.7% were male householders with no spouse present. The average family size was 4.00 people. 0.0% of people in the township older than 24 had a college degree, and the township had an employment rate of 54.5%.
