= Byron Township, Kansas =

Township in Stafford County, Kansas, U.S.

Byron Township
- Township
- Location within Stafford County
- Coordinates: 38.213913°N 98.635153°W
- Country: United States
- State: Kansas
- County: Stafford

Government
  - Trustee: Keith Rose

Area
  - Total: 36.337 sq mi (94.11 km^{2})
  - Land: 36.312 sq mi (94.05 km^{2})
  - Water: 0.025 sq mi (0.065 km^{2}) 0.07%

Population (2020)
  - Total: 63
  - Density: 1.7/sq mi (0.67/km^{2})
- Time zone: UTC-6 (CST)
  - Summer (DST): UTC-5 (CDT)
- Area code: 620
- GNIS feature ID: 475764

Byron Township is a township in Stafford County, Kansas, United States. As of the 2020 census, its population was 63.

== History ==
Byron Township was created from part of Hayes Township.

== Geography ==
Byron Township covers an area of 36.337 square miles (94.11 square kilometers).

=== Adjacent townships ===
Comanche Township, Barton County
		north
North Seward Township, Stafford County	west	self	east	Putnam Township, Stafford County
South Seward Township, Stafford County	southwest	south
Hayes Township, Stafford County

== Demographics ==
As of the 2020 census, there were 63 people and 2 households residing in the township. The population density was 1.7 people per square mile (0.66 people/km^{2}). There were 24 housing units. The racial makeup of the township was 98.4% White and 1.6% Asian.

There were 2 households: 100% were married couples living together. The average family size was 4.00 people. 0.0% of people in the township older than 24 had a college degree, and the township had an employment rate of 62.5%.
