= Sylvia Township, Kansas =

Township in Reno County, Kansas, U.S.

Sylvia Township
- Township
- Location within Reno County
- Coordinates: 37.953422°N 98.413939°W
- Country: United States
- State: Kansas
- County: Reno

Government
  - District 2 County Commissioner: Ron Hirst

Area
  - Total: 35.948 sq mi (93.10 km^{2})
  - Land: 35.881 sq mi (92.93 km^{2})
  - Water: 0.067 sq mi (0.17 km^{2}) 0.19%

Population (2020)
  - Total: 291
  - Density: 8.11/sq mi (3.13/km^{2})
- Time zone: UTC-6 (CST)
  - Summer (DST): UTC-5 (CDT)
- Area code: 620
- GNIS feature ID: 473607

Sylvia Township is a township in Reno County, Kansas, United States. As of the 2020 census, its population was 291.

== Geography ==
Sylvia Township covers an area of 35.948 square miles (93.10 square kilometers).

=== Communities ===
- Sylvia

=== Adjacent townships ===
Hayes Township, Reno County
East Cooper Township, Stafford County	northwest	north	northeast	Huntsville Township, Reno County
Fairview Township, Stafford County	west	self	east	Plevna Township, Reno County
York Township, Stafford County	southwest	south	southeast	Langdon Township, Reno County
Grove Township, Reno County

== Transportation ==
=== Major highways ===
- US-50
