= Tornado outbreak of May 18–21, 2025 =

United States tornado outbreak in May 2025

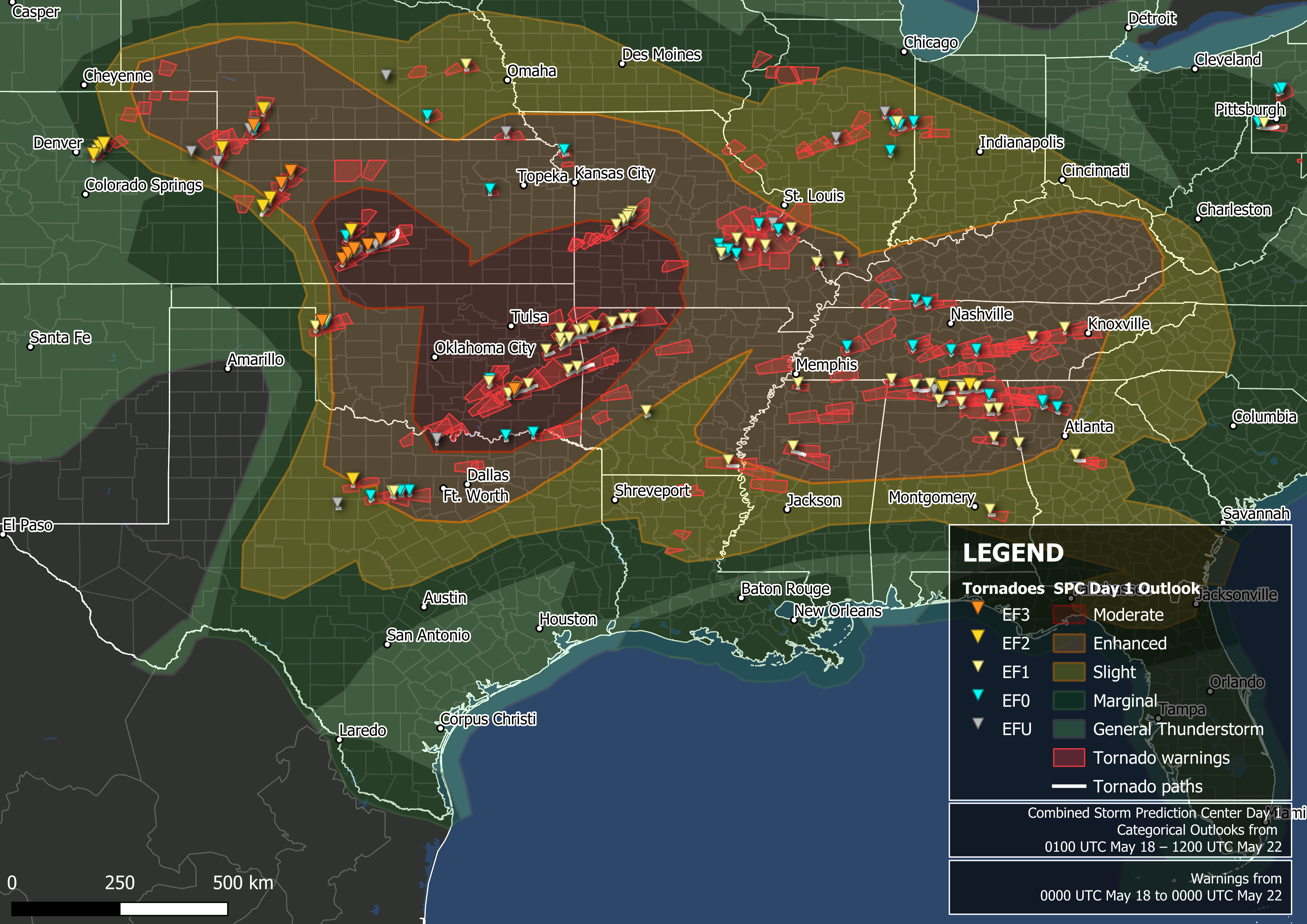
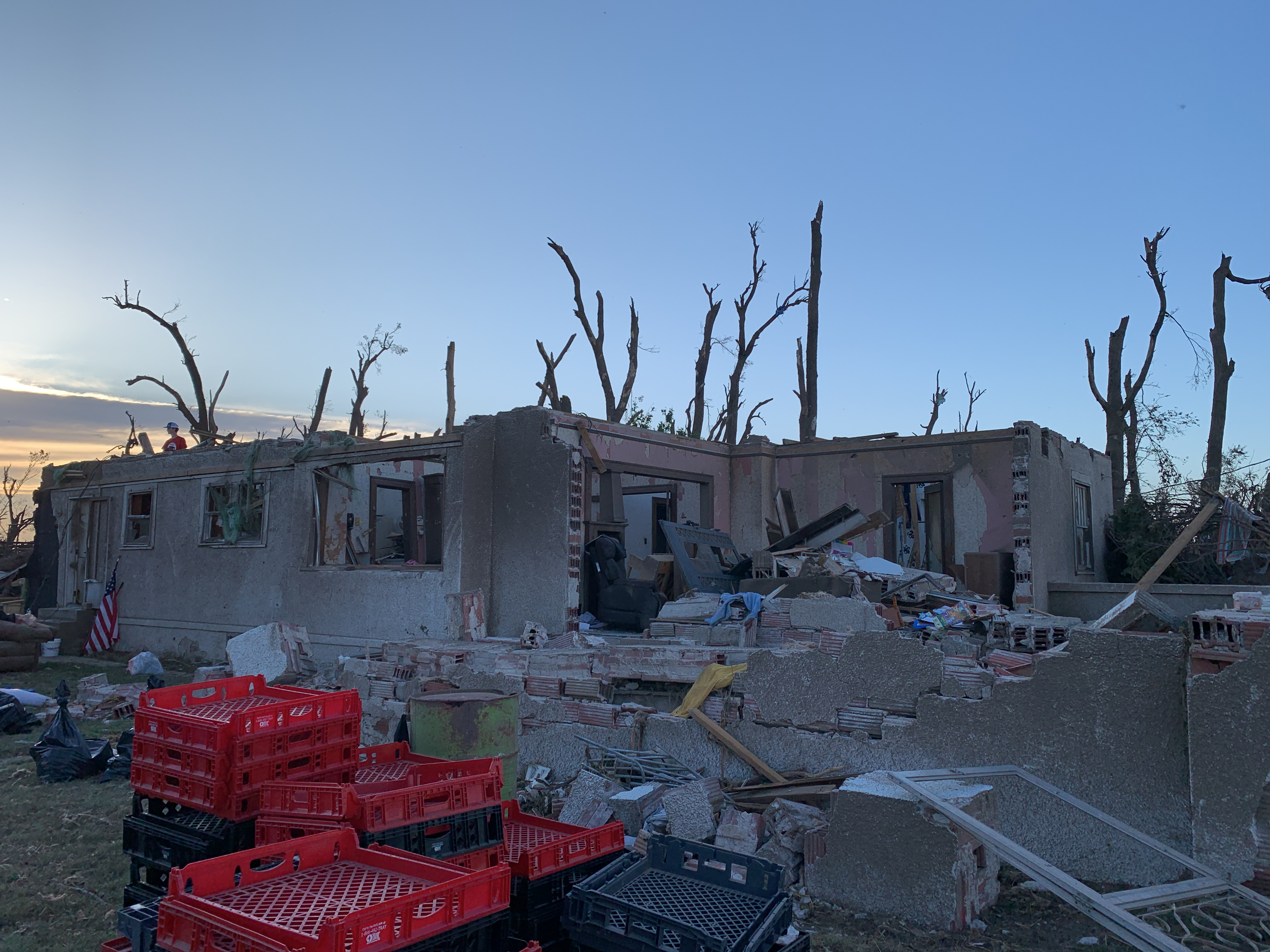
- Clockwise from top: Map of tornado warnings and confirmed tornadoes during the outbreak (from May 18–21); EF3 damage to a home in Grinnell, Kansas after an EF3 tornado on May 18; A wedge tornado near Scott City, Kansas on May 18; EF3 damage to a home near Plevna, Kansas after a tornado on May 18

Meteorological history
- Duration: May 18–21, 2025

Tornado outbreak
- Tornadoes: 133
- Max. rating: EF3 tornado
- Duration: 3 days, 12 hours, 33 minutes
- Highest winds: Tornadic – 160 mph (260 km/h) (Iuka, Kansas EF3 on May 18)
- Highest gusts: Non-tornadic – 90–100 mph (140–160 km/h) in Tuscaloosa County, Alabama on May 18
- Largest hail: 4.5 in (110 mm) near Arnett, Texas on May 18

Overall effects
- Injuries: 12+
- Damage: $2.6 billion (2025 USD)
- Areas affected: Central United States, Great Plains
- Power outages: 115,000
- Part of the Tornadoes of 2025

A major tornado outbreak occurred across the Great Plains and Mid-South regions of the United States from May 18 to May 21, 2025. This event follows another tornado outbreak that occurred just days prior in the Ohio Valley. On May 18, a very narrow but intense EF3 tornado inflicted severe tree damage near Arnett, an EF3 tornado caused severe damage in the town of Grinnell, Kansas across its long path, while an EF1 tornado caused four injuries when it struck Gordon, Texas. After dark, a powerful, cyclic supercell developed in south-central Kansas, eventually producing a long family of five EF3 tornadoes. Two of these prompted tornado emergencies: one as it approached the towns of Greensburg and Brenham, and another that directly hit the small town of Plevna.

Tornado activity shifted towards the Southeast by May 20, and in the evening, another tornado emergency was issued for an EF2 tornado that went through Madison, Alabama, dissipating just before reaching Huntsville. Scattered tornado activity continued into the following day before the outbreak came to an end. No fatalities occurred as a result of the outbreak, although at least 12 were injured. The outbreak caused $2.6 billion (2025 USD) in damages.

== Meteorological synopsis ==
=== May 18 ===
==== Forecast ====
A deep upper-level trough across the western U.S. set the stage for the beginning of the multi-day outbreak on May 18. Strong southwesterly mid-level flow overspread the central and southern Plains, with 500 mb winds of 60–70 knots (69-81 mph) moving over a destabilizing warm sector. At the surface, a sharpening dryline extended from southeastern Colorado into the eastern Texas Panhandle, while a retreating warm front was draped across northern Oklahoma and southern Kansas. This front separated very moist low-level air to the south from drier and cooler air to the north, and it helped focus the afternoon and evening severe threat. Surface dew points surged into the upper 60s and low 70s°F (18 to 23°C), and mixed-layer CAPE (MLCAPE) values reached 3000–4500 J/kg in parts of western Oklahoma and south-central Kansas.

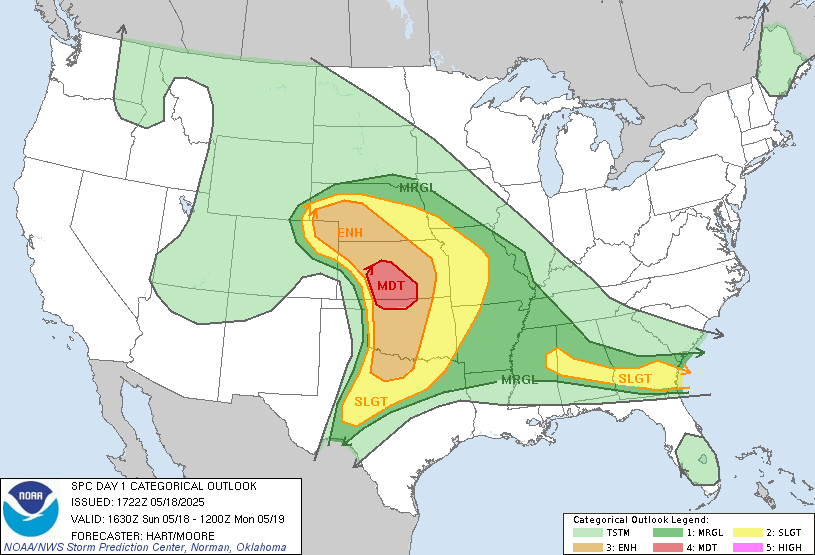
The Day 1 Convective Outlook from May 18, 2025

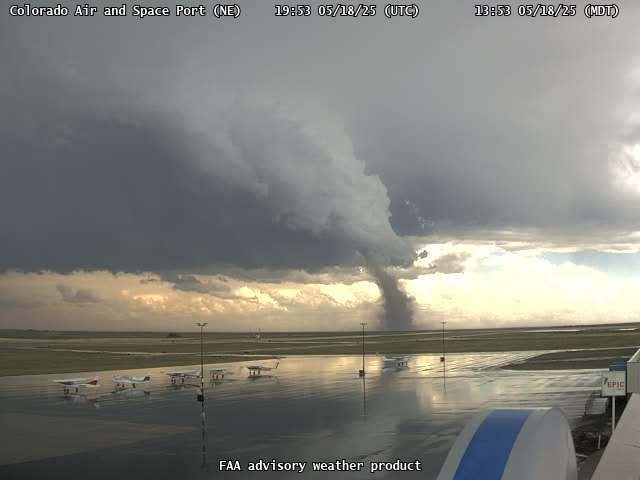
A tornado near Bennett, Colorado on May 18

Forecast models and observed soundings indicated a strongly sheared environment, with enlarged hodographs near the warm front and low-level jet intensification expected during the evening. Effective bulk shear of 50–65 knots (58-75 mph) and SRH values over 300 m^{2}/s² in localized areas created a highly favorable setup for tornadic supercells. The greatest risk was forecast in a corridor from the eastern Texas Panhandle through western Oklahoma and into southern Kansas, especially near the triple point and warm front intersection. With steep mid-level lapse rates and strong instability in place, large to very large hail (potentially 2–4 inches in diameter) was also a significant concern with any sustained supercells. The SPC issued a Moderate Risk for southern Kansas and northern Oklahoma, including a 15% hatched area (EF2+) for tornadoes and very large hail.

By mid- to late afternoon, isolated supercells were expected to initiate near the triple point in southwestern Kansas and farther south along the dryline in western Oklahoma. Storms were forecast to rapidly become severe, with early development possibly influenced by convective inhibition but then quickly intensifying with loss of the cap. Forecast guidance highlighted the potential for one or more discrete supercells to persist into the evening, producing significant hail and strong tornadoes, particularly in southern Kansas and northern Oklahoma. As evening progressed, upscale growth into clusters was anticipated farther south into northwest Texas and southwestern Oklahoma, with increasing wind potential and some continuation of the tornado threat into nighttime.

=== May 19 ===
==== Forecast ====
The second and most expansive day of the outbreak featured a high-end severe weather setup across the southern Plains and Ozarks. A negatively tilted shortwave trough and ejecting upper-level low moved into the central Plains, strengthening upper-level winds and contributing to deep-layer ascent. At the surface, a diffuse low over northern Oklahoma deepened, enhancing convergence along a sharpening dryline that extended through central Oklahoma into central Texas. A warm front also lifted northward across Kansas and Missouri, with multiple outflow boundaries draped across Oklahoma and Arkansas from prior convection. A broad warm sector featured surface dew points in the 70–73°F (21-23°C) range and strong heating, resulting in mixed-layer CAPE of 3000–5000 J/kg across much of the region.

The Day 1 convective outlook outlined on May 19

Wind profiles across the area were extremely favorable for tornadic supercells. Southeasterly surface winds backed into 50–70 kt (58-81 mph) southwesterly flow aloft, producing long, curved hodographs and effective bulk shear of 45–60 kt (52-69 mph) across the warm sector. Effective SRH increased through the afternoon as a 40–50 kt (46-58 mph) low-level jet developed from eastern Oklahoma into western Arkansas and southern Missouri. Forecasters at the SPC emphasized that any discrete storm in this environment could produce strong tornadoes, particularly near intersecting boundaries or in regions with minimal convective interference. A Moderate Risk was issued across southeastern Kansas, eastern Oklahoma, and portions of Missouri and Arkansas, with a 15% hatched tornado risk and a significant wind threat due to potential upscale growth.

Storms were expected to initiate by early afternoon in southeastern Kansas and northeastern Oklahoma, aided by an approaching shortwave and lingering boundaries. Additional initiation was forecast along the dryline near the I-35 corridor from Oklahoma City to Dallas by mid- to late afternoon. Early storm mode was expected to be discrete, with the potential for long-track tornadic supercells across parts of eastern Oklahoma, southeastern Kansas, and into the Ozarks. As multiple storms developed and interacted, upscale growth into bowing segments or clusters was anticipated, especially across southwestern Missouri and northwestern Arkansas during the evening hours. This led to a growing concern for widespread damaging wind gusts and embedded tornadoes into the night.

=== May 20 ===
==== Forecast ====
On May 20, the severe threat shifted east into the Mid-South, as a broad upper-level trough progressed into the Mississippi and Tennessee Valleys. Strong mid-level and upper-level flow remained in place across the region, with 500 mb winds of 60–70 kt (69-81 mph) overspreading Tennessee, Mississippi, and Alabama. At the surface, a low pressure center tracked from the Missouri/Illinois region into Indiana, with a trailing cold front pushing through Arkansas and western Tennessee. Rich low-level moisture remained entrenched across the Southeast, with dew points in the low 70s°F (20s°C) and MLCAPE of 2000–3000 J/kg, particularly from northern Mississippi and Alabama into Tennessee and Kentucky.

A morning QLCS moved east across the Tennessee Valley, potentially limiting destabilization in some areas, but clearing behind this line allowed for rapid recovery of instability. A strengthening south-southwesterly low-level jet of 40–50 kt (46-58 mph) developed by afternoon from Mississippi into Kentucky, yielding large, looping hodographs supportive of tornadic supercells. The SPC issued an Enhanced Risk across much of Tennessee, northern Alabama, and southern Kentucky, including a 10% hatched tornado area to highlight the potential for a few strong tornadoes, particularly with discrete supercells ahead of the front or along remnant boundaries. Forecast soundings in the region showed minimal inhibition and favorable shear for rotating storms.

By mid-afternoon, additional storm development was expected near the front in northern Mississippi, western Alabama, and Tennessee, with some storms remaining semi-discrete or forming embedded supercells within clusters. Large hail and damaging winds were forecast alongside the tornado threat, especially where boundary interactions or prefrontal convergence zones focused development. The environment favored at least a few supercells capable of producing significant tornadoes, particularly before upscale growth. Into the evening, storms were expected to organize into clusters and lines moving into the southern Appalachians and Georgia, with damaging winds becoming the dominant threat but an ongoing tornado risk in areas with sufficient instability and shear.

== Confirmed tornadoes ==
Confirmed tornadoes by Enhanced Fujita rating
EFU	EF0	EF1	EF2	EF3	EF4	EF5	Total
15	35	60	13	10	0	0	133

=== Grinnell, Kansas ===
Grinnell, Kansas
- The tornado, seen south of Grinnell

Meteorological history
- Formed: May 18, 2025, 6:32 p.m. CDT (UTC–05:00)
- Dissipated: May 18, 2025, 7:02 p.m. CDT (UTC–05:00)
- Duration: 29 minutes

EF3 tornado
- on the Enhanced Fujita scale
- Highest winds: 140 mph (230 km/h)

Overall effects
- Fatalities: 0
- Injuries: 2

This intense tornado touched down in Gove County south of Grinnell at 6:32 pm CDT. Upon touching down, the tornado moved just east of due north and struck a farm at EF1 intensity, pushing a grain bin a half-inch inward, blowing and moving hay bales and two large green carts, blowing out the wall of a shed, destroying a chicken coop, spinning an antique cultivator around, and blowing out the windows of a home while knocking its chimney down onto the roof. It also leaned a power pole, and sheared the tops off of trees, which also had metal sheeting thrown into it. Turning north-northeastward, the tornado intensified to EF2 strength and snapped four wooden power poles along County Road 26. Further to the northeast, the tornado leaned four more power poles at EF1 intensity along County Road Y. At another farm on County Road Z, a home had roof shingles removed, wood paneling uplifted, and shattered windows. A tiny home nearby was destroyed, a large propane tank was taken off its concrete base and rolled 30–40 ft (9.1–12.2 m) up an embankment into a wheatfield, trees were uprooted, and tree limbs were snapped. The tornado then rolled some pivots before moving out over open farm fields towards Grinnell.

After crossing County Road CC, the tornado began to move more erratically northward and crossed I-70/US 40 west of the K-216 exit. Interstate signs were damaged, and several vehicles, including semi-trucks and car haulers, were thrown into the fields on the north side of the freeway. The tornado also downed or snapped at least 15 power lines along the interstate, prompting the Kansas Department of Transportation to close portions of the freeway in the area. The tornado then turned northeastward and then back north-northeastward and crossed Old Highway 40 at EF2 intensity, removing most of the roof off a house, destroying two metal buildings and a garage, and shredding, debarking, and knocking down pine and cedar trees. A combine was turned 90 degrees and a Dodge pickup truck was flipped 54 yd (49 m) into a tree line along with a debris from the metal buildings. An empty grain bin, metal debris, and a grain cart were thrown long distances and scattered across fields on the north side of the highway as well.

The tornado then struck Grinnell; it first impacted a football field on the south side of the town, destroying the buildings, nine power/light poles, bleachers, and scoreboard. It then moved into Grinnell along Harrison Street, pushing multiple homes off their foundations, including some that collapsed, leveling other homes, Quonset hut outbuildings, and other outbuildings. Additional homes had roofs partially to completely removed and exterior walls knocked, a church lost a large section of its roof, an elementary school suffered roof damage, many vehicles and headstones at a cemetery were damaged, power poles were snapped, and trees were snapped with some debarking noted. Most of the damage was rated EF2 due to most of the structures being unanchored or poorly anchored, but two of the homes that had exterior walls knocked down were well-built and received low-end EF3 ratings. The tornado then departed Grinnell, tossing tree and structural debris in a wheatfield before dissipating north of the town at 7:02 pm CDT. It was on the ground for 30 minutes, traveled 13.33 mi (21.45 km), had a peak width of 416 yd (380 m), and injured two people.

=== Greensburg–Plevna, Kansas tornado family ===
Greensburg–Plevna, Kansas tornado family
- A NEXRAD radar loop of the supercell responsible for the tornadoes.

Meteorological history
- Formed: May 18, 2025, 9:21 p.m. CDT (UTC–05:00)
- Dissipated: May 19, 2025, 12:17 a.m. CDT (UTC–05:00)
- Duration: ~2 hour, 56 minutes

Tornado family
- Tornadoes: 8
- Max. rating: EF3 tornado
- Highest winds: 160 mph (260 km/h) (Iuka, Kansas tornado)

Overall effects
- Casualties: None
- Economic losses: Unknown

Confirmed tornadoes by Enhanced Fujita rating
EFU	EF0	EF1	EF2	EF3	EF4	EF5	Total
1	0	2	0	5	0	0	8

Eight tornadoes, including five that were rated EF3, were confirmed as part of a family that tracked from the Greensburg area to Plevna. The tornadoes were spawned by a pair of supercells across southern Kansas. Twice during the event the Storm Prediction Center (SPC) noted in rare and unusually localized meso-gamma mesoscale discussions that the parent supercell was in a "highly favorable and localized corridor for tornadoes". The second mesoscale discussion noted the most probable peak intensity was 155-190 mph, the second highest rating seen on a mesoscale discussion. This was due to the existing very high parameters for tornadogenesis, including high shear caused by an increasing low-level jet and a high level of CAPE, both indicated by a sounding performed by NWS Dodge City. The cell also had almost no interactions with other storms after it merged east of Greensburg, allowing it to spawn tornadoes without interruption.

==== Coldwater–Mullinville, Kansas ====
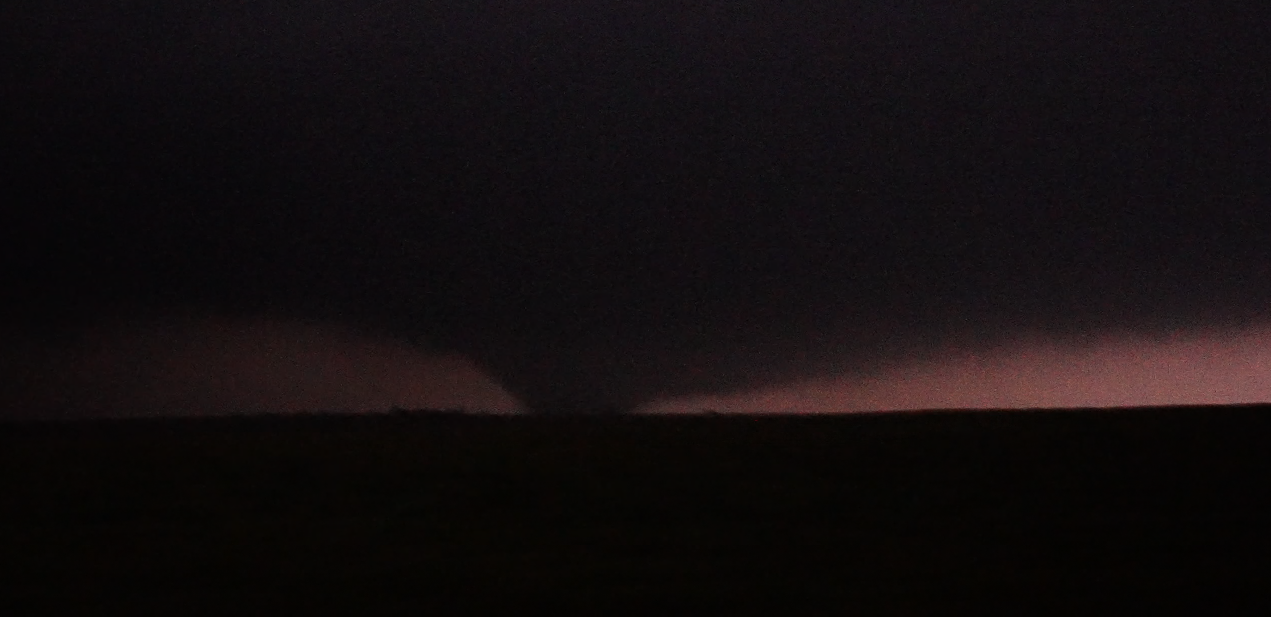
The tornado seen west of US 183 to the northwest of Coldwater.

A large tornado touched down at 9:21 pm CDT, producing EF0 tree damage to forested areas west of US 183. Unlike other tornadoes in the family, it moved due north. On the intersection of KC Avenue 17 and Street U in rural Kiowa County, the tornado inflicted EF3 damage to a metal building system and debarked trees; wind speeds were estimated to have been as high as 155 miles per hour (249 km/h) as the tornado impacted the structures. EF1 damage was inflicted to wooden power poles on Street T, and trees were snapped on KC Avenue 17 before the tornado curved to the east, dissipating on 19th Avenue at 9:38 pm. The tornado was the first of the prolific supercell and was of high-end EF3 intensity.

==== Greensburg–Brenham, Kansas ====
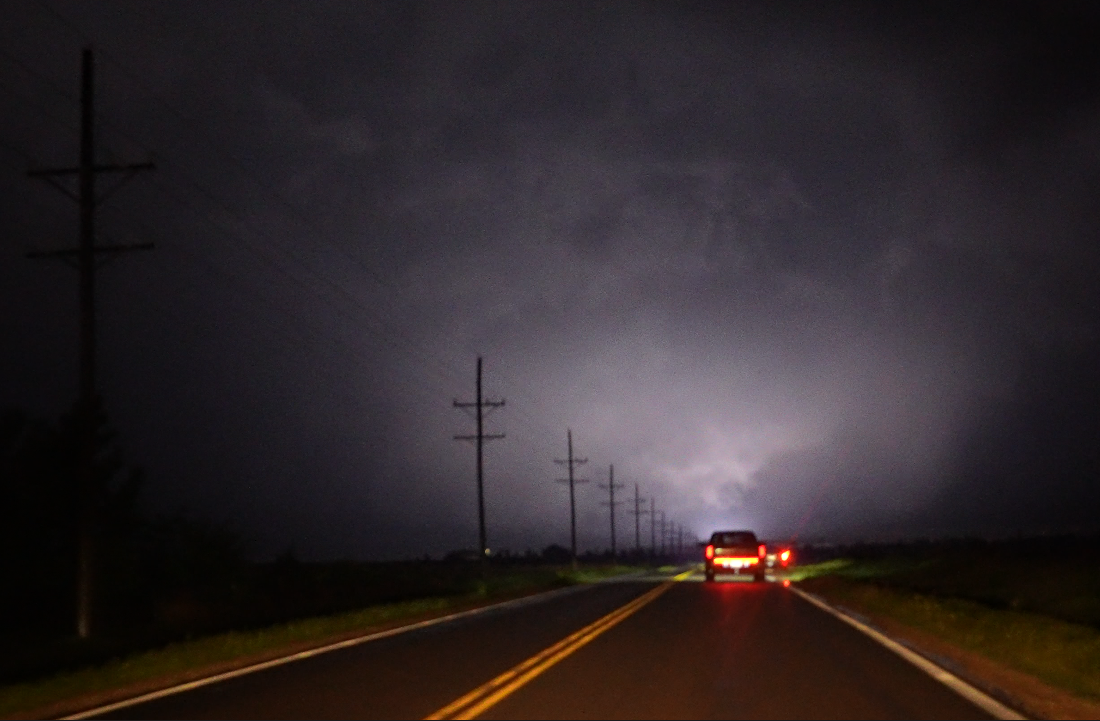
The large tornado crossing US 183 south of Greensburg. A power flash is shown.

A second strong tornado touched down a short distance to the northeast, immediately producing EF2-rated damage to wooden power poles as it traversed over US 183, on a track initially similar to the May 4, 2007 tornado. On the highway, a semi-truck was tipped over, and a tornado emergency was issued for Greensburg shortly after that, as it curved northeast, allowing the tornado to narrowly miss the town. To the northeast, at the intersection of County Road N and 31st Avenue, the tornado inflicted EF2-rated damage to 0.25 miles (0.40 km) of power lines. A short distance to the north, a brief low-end EF1 satellite tornado formed to the west of the main tornado, inflicting EF1 damage to power lines before lifting. The main tornado debarked trees at EF3 intensity as it moved northeast before abruptly curving to the east. The tornado tossed a pivot system as it tracked south of K Street before veering to the north, producing EF1 damage as it impacted Brenham before lifting.

==== Haviland, Kansas ====
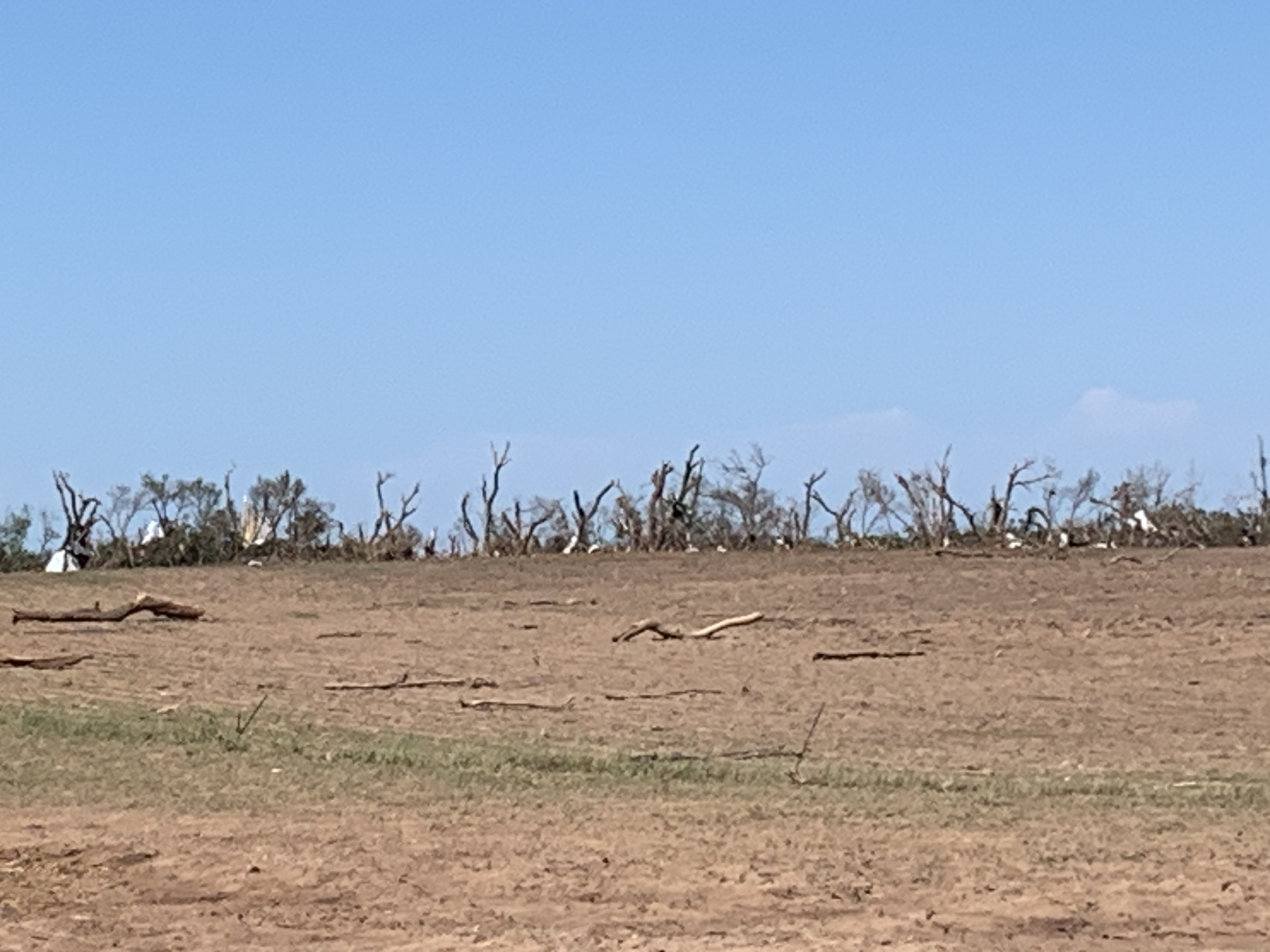
Mid-Range EF3 tree damage near Haviland.

A third strong tornado first touched down directly south of Brenham at 10:04 pm CDT and moved northeastward. After crossing US 54, it struck a Union Pacific intermodal train west of Haviland, overturning about 100 double-stack railcars. The train had been stopped when the tornado struck, but no casualties were reported, nor have any hazardous materials been released into the environment. Moving to the northeast, the tornado debarked trees and inflicted significant damage to power lines on I Street in rural Kiowa County. More EF2-rated damage was inflicted to a 0.50-mile (0.80 km) stretch of power lines and poles on 47th Avenue. A home was destroyed at EF2 intensity, as the tornado continued northeast, a home on G Street was deroofed. On E Street, a pivot was tossed and significantly damaged. The tornado first reached EF3 intensity as it debarked hardwood trees in a forested area near 53rd Avenue. It continued producing damage as it moved to the north and northeast before lifting near 57th Avenue at 10:34 pm CDT.

==== Cullison–Iuka, Kansas ====
A fourth intense tornado touched down on Northwest 20th Street, north of Cullison in Pratt County at 10:47 pm CDT, flipping a pivot at EF0 intensity while moving to the northeast. The tornado rapidly intensified as it impacted a property on Northwest 30th Street, where softwood trees were debarked and a metal building system was completely destroyed. The tornado turned eastward, breaking power lines at EF2 intensity on Northwest 40th Avenue and Northwest 50th Avenue. A pivot was flipped and separated into pieces as the tornado neared Iuka; it tracked north of town before dissipating at 11:08 pm CDT. An EFU satellite tornado also occurred south of Iuka.

==== Preston–Plevna, Kansas ====
The Preston–Plevna EF3 tornado, seen near Preston

A fifth large and destructive tornado first touched down at 11:17 p.m. CDT on May 18, immediately producing EF0 damage to hardwood trees east of Northeast 50th Avenue. As it continued to track northeast, it reached EF3 intensity for the first time over a home on the corner of Northeast 100th Street and North 60th Avenue. Wind speeds as the tornado impacted the home reached an estimated 155 miles per hour (249 km/h); mid-range EF3 damage was inflicted to the structure. Further northeast, on Northeast 70th Avenue, trees were debarked by the tornado at EF3 intensity. More EF3-rated damage was inflicted to a building and trees at the corner of Northeast 80th Avenue and Northeast 110th Street. Another building to the east was completely destroyed, and the exterior walls of another building on the property collapsed. The tornado produced EF2 damage as it moved to the east and northeast, where trees were significantly damaged. Southeast of Neola, the tornado again reached EF3 intensity as it impacted homes and trees.

The tornado continued traveling northeast at around 35 mph (56 km/h), hitting the city of Plevna. A tornado emergency was issued for Plevna as it approached the city. The tornado dissipated at 12:17 a.m. CDT north of Plevna.

The next morning, Reno County officials stated they believed Plevna took a direct hit from the tornado, which they estimated to have been 1 mi (1.6 km) wide. Damage occurred to homes, trees, vehicles, and mobile homes, but county officials were unaware of any casualties from the storm. Most of the town's residents took shelter in the town's church, which did not take a direct hit from the tornado.

== Non-tornadic effects ==
Four people were injured by a storm near Cisco, Texas. Severe weather forced a Halsey concert in Arkansas to be postponed, and forced a municipal airport to close. At Target Field in Minneapolis, a Major League Baseball game on May 19 was suspended due to the severe weather. In Des Moines, Iowa, 3.74 in (95 mm) of rain fell, which was the most in a single day in the month of May. The overall rainfall total in Des Moines was 4.95 in (126 mm). In addition, wind speeds of over 60 mph (97 km/h) and hail also affected the state. Two people were injured by storms in Alabama.

== Aftermath ==
=== Recovery ===
==== Local support ====
Following the tornadoes, emergency protocols were issued by the Reno County Emergency Management. Residents were urged to avoid affected areas and barricaded roads, not enter damaged buildings unless deemed safe, and call and report 911 when encountering downed powerlines or gas leaks. On May 19, a Reno County volunteer group, Voluntary Organizations Active in Disaster or VOAD, opened up a so-called "Multi-Agency Resource Center" (MARC) at the Abbyville Community Church, which was open from 4:00 PM-6:00 PM CDT (21:00-23:00 UTC). The American Red Cross also operated a 24-hour emergency shelter at this location. In Plevna, city-wide projects took place to clean up debris one of the tornadoes left behind. Schools, such as Fairfield USD 310, canceled all classes and allowed victims to use their buildings shower inside, and as shelter against the elements. By May 22, hundreds of volunteers came into Plevna to help restore lost belongings and properties of residents. Residents at the same time organized a fundraiser to save the town's historic community building, which was at risk to be demolished due to lack of insurance.

On November 18, six months after the tornado events, residents of Plevna reflected on their reconstruction process. Electrical, HVAC, plumbing services were largely finished in the small town. One woman, and her family who survived the tornado southwest of Plevna on South Langdon Road, vividly remembered the surreal moments during the tornado. The family hoped to live back in the home in the spring of 2026. One year after by May 18, 2026, Plevna continues to recover from the tornado.

During recovery, one big problem that stood in the way for some residents, was the issue with home insurance. Of the 19 families seeking aid and assistance in Plevna with home insurance, ten of them did not have any. One family, the Hendersons, were among the several that did not have insurance. Due to rising costs, they dropped theirs three weeks before the tornado. After the storm, the Hendersons faced up with high repair costs and long-term debt. The high demand of contractors in Plevna also created a labor shortage, forcing many families and victims of the tornado to reside into temporary housing methods.

==== State and federal aid ====
In June 2025, Kansas governor Laura Kelly has stated that since day one of the recovery process of the state, she was committed to provide technical, logistical, environmental and health resources to the affected counties, alongside advocating necessities to the Federal Emergency Management Agency (FEMA) and Small Business Administration (SBA). During the day of the tornadoes and floods on May 18 and after the storms, the Kansas Division of Emergency Management (KDEM) began their response with local officials. Alongside FEMA and SBA, KDEM coordinated damage assessments, humanitarian services with volunteer organizations, and technical recovery assistance. By June 4, governor Kelly issued a disaster declaration for the Counties of Bourbon, Cheyenne, Edwards, Gove, Logan, Scott and Sheridan, alongside Kiowa, Pratt, Reno and Stafford Counties. The day after on June 5, Kansas initiated a joint Public Assistance Program Preliminary Damage Assessments (PDA) which was assisted by KDEM and FEMA's Region VII. PDA teams examined the damage to public infrastructure, which included roads, bridges and utilities to determine if the damage reached the threshold needed to formally request a presidential disaster declaration.

On June 17, 2025, state governor Kelly requested a statewide disaster declaration to FEMA, which was under the second tenure of U.S. president Donald Trump. One month later on July 23, Trump approved the request by Laura Kelly for the state of Kansas, and communities like Plevna. A Public Assistance fund campaign was exclusively eligible to the state, particular tribal and local governments, and certain private non-profit organizations across the previously mentioned counties. By September 17, FEMA put out a notice that Individual Assistance (IA) was not approved for the counties affected by the storms and flooding in mid-May. FEMA aid was instead partially directed for the possible restoration of infrastructure and utilities. The reasoning behind this, was due to the presence of historical properties and activities located in the wetlands or the 100-500-year old flood plains. Extensive IA activities could cause disruptions to regions already vulnerable from flooding that have occurred months earlier.

== See also ==
- Weather of 2025
- List of North American tornadoes and tornado outbreaks
- 1991 Andover tornado outbreak
- Tornado outbreak of May 4–6, 2007
