= Clear Creek Township, Stafford County, Kansas =

Township in Stafford County, Kansas, U.S.

Clear Creek Township
- Township
- Location within Stafford County
- Coordinates: 37.86897°N 98.967557°W
- Country: United States
- State: Kansas
- County: Stafford
- Established: 1879

Government
  - Trustee: Mike Lamb

Area
  - Total: 36.124 sq mi (93.56 km^{2})
  - Land: 36.124 sq mi (93.56 km^{2})
  - Water: 0 sq mi (0 km^{2}) 0%

Population (2020)
  - Total: 21
  - Density: 0.58/sq mi (0.22/km^{2})
- Time zone: UTC-6 (CST)
  - Summer (DST): UTC-5 (CDT)
- Area code: 620
- GNIS feature ID: 473559

Clear Creek Township is a township in Stafford County, Kansas, United States. As of the 2020 census, its population was 21.

== History ==
Clear Creek Township was created on July 14, 1879. Albano Township was eventually created from part of Clear Creek Township.

== Geography ==
Clear Creek Township covers an area of 36.124 square miles (93.56 square kilometers). Rattlesnake Creek flows through it.

=== Adjacent townships ===
Farmington Township, Stafford County
Belpre Township, Edwards County	northwest	north	northeast	Richland Township, Stafford County
Lincoln Township, Edwards County	west	self	east	Albano Township, Stafford County
		south
Township 8, Pratt County

== Demographics ==
As of the 2020 census, there were 21 people and 17 households residing in the township. The population density was 0.58 people per square mile (0.22 people/km^{2}). There were 17 housing units. The racial makeup of the township was 100% White. Hispanics or Latinos of any race were 9.5% of the population.

There were 17 households: 41.2% were married couples living together and 58.8% were female householders with no spouse present. The average family size was 2.00 people. 0.0% of people in the township older than 24 had a college degree, and the township had an employment rate of 58.3%.
