= Carol Long =

American artist

- Style: Art Nouveau

Carol Long is an American artist. She is known for creating colourful ceramic sculptures that are richly adorned with flora and fauna.

== Childhood ==
Long was born in 1965. She was raised on a farm in Stafford County, Kansas. It helped her develop an appreciation of animal and plant life which later inspired her art style. As a child, she began creating sculptures by using her father’s cattle syringes which she filled with mud.

== Art ==
Long handcrafts colorful, ceramic sculptures that are lavishly decorated with natural objects such as butterflies, chrysalises, birds, flowers and plants. She creates vases, mugs, jars bottles, bowls, jewelry boxes, and other functional and ornamental objects. Curvy handles, exaggerated proportions and surrealistic patterns are characteristics of her works.
