= Putnam Township, Stafford County, Kansas =

Township in Stafford County, Kansas, U.S.

Putnam Township
- Township
- Location within Stafford County
- Coordinates: 38.166081°N 98.522022°W
- Country: United States
- State: Kansas
- County: Stafford

Government
  - Trustee: Mary Gatton

Area
  - Total: 72.606 sq mi (188.05 km^{2})
  - Land: 70.494 sq mi (182.58 km^{2})
  - Water: 2.112 sq mi (5.47 km^{2}) 2.91%

Population (2020)
  - Total: 13
  - Density: 0.18/sq mi (0.071/km^{2})
- Time zone: UTC-6 (CST)
  - Summer (DST): UTC-5 (CDT)
- Area code: 620
- GNIS feature ID: 475771

Putnam Township is a township in Stafford County, Kansas, United States. As of the 2020 census, its population was 13.

== History ==
Putnam Township was created from part of Hayes Township.

== Geography ==
Putnam Township covers an area of 72.606 square miles (188.05 square kilometers). Most of the Quivira National Wildlife Refuge and Little Salt Marsh are located within the township. Rattlesnake Creek flows through it as well.

=== Adjacent townships ===
Comanche Township, Barton County
Byron Township, Stafford County	northwest	north	northeast	Raymond Township, Rice County
Hayes Township, Stafford County	west	self	east	Bell Township, Rice County
West Cooper Township, Stafford County	southwest	south	southeast	Hayes Township, Reno County
East Cooper Township, Stafford County

== Demographics ==
As of the 2020 census, there were 13 people and 5 households residing in the township. The population density was 0.18 people per square mile (0.069 people/km^{2}). There were 5 housing units. The racial makeup of the township was 100% White.

There were 5 households: 100% were married couples living together. The average family size was 1.40 people. 71.4% of people in the township older than 24 had a college degree, and the township had an employment rate of 100%.
