= Township 8, Pratt County, Kansas =

Township in Pratt County, Kansas, U.S.

Township 8
- Township
- Location within Pratt County
- Coordinates: 37.779303°N 98.903998°W
- Country: United States
- State: Kansas
- County: Pratt
- Established: 1970s

Government
  - County Commissioner District 2: Morgan Trinkle

Area
  - Total: 76.198 sq mi (197.35 km^{2})
  - Land: 76.198 sq mi (197.35 km^{2})
  - Water: 0 sq mi (0 km^{2}) 0%

Population (2020)
  - Total: 108
  - Density: 1.42/sq mi (0.547/km^{2})
- Time zone: UTC-6 (CST)
  - Summer (DST): UTC-5 (CDT)
- Area code: 620
- GNIS feature ID: 473760

Township 8 is a township in Pratt County, Kansas, United States. As of the 2020 census, its population was 108.

== History ==
Township 8 used to be made up of Naron Township. In 1909 part of Naron Township was taken to form Lincoln Township. Both Lincoln and Naron Townships were dissolved in the 1970s to form Township 8.

== Geography ==
Township 8 covers an area of 76.198 square miles (197.35 square kilometers).

=== Communities ===
- Byers
- Hopewell

=== Adjacent townships ===
Albano Township, Stafford County
Clear Creek Township, Stafford County	northwest	north	northeast	Rose Valley Township, Stafford County
Lincoln Township, Edwards County	west	self	east	Township 7, Pratt County
Kiowa Rural Township, Kiowa County	southwest	south
Township 9, Pratt County
