= York Township, Kansas =

Township in Stafford County, Kansas, U.S.

York Township
- Township
- Location within Stafford County
- Coordinates: 37.872924°N 98.519334°W
- Country: United States
- State: Kansas
- County: Stafford

Government
  - Trustee: Zachary Wilson

Area
  - Total: 36.021 sq mi (93.29 km^{2})
  - Land: 35.878 sq mi (92.92 km^{2})
  - Water: 0.143 sq mi (0.37 km^{2}) 0.40%

Population (2020)
  - Total: 55
  - Density: 1.5/sq mi (0.59/km^{2})
- Time zone: UTC-6 (CST)
  - Summer (DST): UTC-5 (CDT)
- Area code: 620
- GNIS feature ID: 473593

York Township is a township in Stafford County, Kansas, United States. As of the 2020 census, its population was 55.

== History ==
York Township was created on July 14, 1879. Union Township was eventually created from part of York Township.

== Geography ==
York Township covers an area of 36.021 square miles (93.29 square kilometers). The North Fork Ninnescah River flows through it.

=== Communities ===
- Neola

=== Adjacent townships ===
Fairview Township, Stafford County
Stafford Township, Stafford County	northwest	north	northeast	Sylvia Township, Reno County
Union Township, Stafford County	west	self	east	Grove Township, Reno County
		south
Township 6, Pratt County

== Demographics ==
As of the 2020 census, there were 55 people and 1 household residing in the township. The population density was 1.5 people per square mile (0.58 people/km^{2}). There was 1 housing unit. The racial makeup of the township was 96.4% White, 1.8% Native American and 1.8% from two or more races.

There was 1 household: it was a male householder with no spouse present. 0.0% of people in the township older than 24 had a college degree, and the township had an employment rate of 100%.
