= East Cooper Township, Kansas =

Township in Stafford County, Kansas, U.S.

East Cooper Township
- Township
- Location within Stafford County
- Coordinates: 38.039075°N 98.517948°W
- Country: United States
- State: Kansas
- County: Stafford
- Established: 1910s

Government
  - Trustee: Joshua Austin

Area
  - Total: 35.942 sq mi (93.09 km^{2})
  - Land: 35.669 sq mi (92.38 km^{2})
  - Water: 0.273 sq mi (0.71 km^{2}) 0.76%

Population (2020)
  - Total: 55
  - Density: 1.5/sq mi (0.60/km^{2})
- Time zone: UTC-6 (CST)
  - Summer (DST): UTC-5 (CDT)
- Area code: 620
- GNIS feature ID: 473603

East Cooper Township is a township in Stafford County, Kansas, United States. As of the 2020 census, its population was 55.

== History ==
East Cooper Township was created in the 1910s with the division of Cooper Township in half. Cooper Township itself was created in 1879.

== Geography ==
East Cooper Township covers an area of 35.942 square miles (93.09 square kilometers). Part of the Quivira National Wildlife Refuge and Little Salt Marsh are located within the township.

=== Adjacent townships ===
Putnam Township, Stafford County
Hayes Township, Stafford County	northwest	north
West Cooper Township, Stafford County	west	self	east	Hayes Township, Reno County
Stafford Township, Stafford County	southwest	south	southeast	Sylvia Township, Reno County
Fairview Township, Stafford County

== Demographics ==
As of the 2020 census, there were 55 people and 15 households residing in the township. The population density was 1.5 people per square mile (0.58 people/km^{2}). There were 15 housing units. The racial makeup of the township was 92.7% White, and 7.3% from two or more races. Hispanics or Latinos of any race were 3.6% of the population.

There were 15 households: 33.3% were married couples living together, 53.3% were a male householder with no spouse present, and 13.3% were a female householder with no spouse present. The average family size was 1.60 people. 38.9% of people in the township older than 24 had a college degree, and the township had an employment rate of 83.3%.
