= Union Township, Stafford County, Kansas =

Township in Stafford County, Kansas, U.S.

Union Township
- Township
- Location within Stafford County
- Coordinates: 37.87514°N 98.646044°W
- Country: United States
- State: Kansas
- County: Stafford

Government
  - Trustee: Brad Johnson

Area
  - Total: 36.116 sq mi (93.54 km^{2})
  - Land: 36.024 sq mi (93.30 km^{2})
  - Water: 0.092 sq mi (0.24 km^{2}) 0.25%

Population (2020)
  - Total: 39
  - Density: 1.1/sq mi (0.42/km^{2})
- Time zone: UTC-6 (CST)
  - Summer (DST): UTC-5 (CDT)
- Area code: 620
- GNIS feature ID: 473584

Union Township is a township in Stafford County, Kansas, United States. As of the 2020 census, its population was 39.

== History ==
Union Township was created from parts of Rose Valley Township and York Township.

== Geography ==
Union Township covers an area of 36.116 square miles (93.54 square kilometers). The North Fork Solomon River flows through it.

=== Adjacent townships ===
Stafford Township, Stafford County
Ohio Township, Stafford County	northwest	north	northeast	Fairview Township, Stafford County
Rose Valley Township, Stafford County	west	self	east	York Township, Stafford County
Township 7, Pratt County	southwest	south
Township 6, Pratt County

== Demographics ==
As of the 2020 census, there were 39 people and 8 households residing in the township. The population density was 1.1 people per square mile (0.42 people/km^{2}). There were 8 housing units. The racial makeup of the township was 92.3% White, 5.1% from some other race, and 2.6% from two or more races. Hispanics or Latinos of any race were 5.1% of the population.

There were 8 households: 75.0% were married couples living together and 25.0% had a female householder with no spouse present. The average family size was 2.83 people. 63.2% of people in the township older than 24 had a college degree, and the township had an employment rate of 73.7%.
