= Farmington Township, Stafford County, Kansas =

Township in Stafford County, Kansas, U.S.

Farmington Township
- Township
- Location within Stafford County
- Coordinates: 37.956447°N 98.967487°W
- Country: United States
- State: Kansas
- County: Stafford

Government
  - Trustee: Audrey Austin

Area
  - Total: 36.133 sq mi (93.58 km^{2})
  - Land: 36.133 sq mi (93.58 km^{2})
  - Water: 0 sq mi (0 km^{2}) 0%

Population (2020)
  - Total: 521
  - Density: 14.4/sq mi (5.57/km^{2})
- Time zone: UTC-6 (CST)
  - Summer (DST): UTC-5 (CDT)
- Area code: 620
- GNIS feature ID: 473558

Farmington Township is a township in Stafford County, Kansas, United States. As of the 2020 census, its population was 521.

== Geography ==
Farmington Township covers an area of 36.133 square miles (93.58 square kilometers).

=== Communities ===
- Macksville

=== Adjacent townships ===
Valley Center Township, Pawnee County
| Pleasant Valley Township, Pawnee County | northwest | north | northeast | Cleveland Township, Stafford County |
| Belpre Township, Edwards County | west | self | east | Richland Township, Stafford County |
| Lincoln Township, Edwards County | southwest | south | southeast | Albano Township, Stafford County |
Clear Creek Township, Stafford County

== Transportation ==
=== Major highways ===
- US-50

== Demographics ==
As of the 2020 census, there were 521 people and 272 households residing in the township. The population density was 14.4 people per square mile (5.6 people/km^{2}). There were 324 housing units. The racial makeup of the township was 70.8% White, 1.0% Native American, 0.4% Asian, 0.2% Black or African American, 0.2% Pacific Islander, 12.9% from some other race, and 14.6% from two or more races. Hispanics or Latinos of any race were 29.8% of the population.

There were 272 households: 43.4% were married couples living together, 12.1% were a male householder with no spouse present, and 35.7% were a female householder with no spouse present. The average family size was 3.15 people. 28.9% of people in the township older than 24 had a college degree, and the township had an employment rate of 59.1%.
