= West Cooper Township, Kansas =

Township in Stafford County, Kansas, U.S.

West Cooper Township
- Township
- Location within Stafford County
- Coordinates: 38.049354°N 98.64193°W
- Country: United States
- State: Kansas
- County: Stafford

Government
  - Trustee: David Rewerts

Area
  - Total: 35.977 sq mi (93.18 km^{2})
  - Land: 35.925 sq mi (93.05 km^{2})
  - Water: 0.052 sq mi (0.13 km^{2}) 0.14%

Population (2020)
  - Total: 57
  - Density: 1.6/sq mi (0.61/km^{2})
- Time zone: UTC-6 (CST)
  - Summer (DST): UTC-5 (CDT)
- Area code: 620
- GNIS feature ID: 473582

West Cooper Township is a township in Stafford County, Kansas, United States. As of the 2020 census, its population was 57.

== History ==
West Cooper Township was created in the 1910s with the division of Cooper Township in half. Cooper Township itself was created in 1879.

== Geography ==
West Cooper Township covers an area of 35.977 square miles (93.18 square kilometers). Rattlesnake Creek flows through it.

=== Adjacent townships ===
Hayes Township, Stafford County
South Seward Township, Stafford County	northwest	north	northeast	Putnam Township, Stafford County
St. John Township, Stafford County	west	self	east	East Cooper Township, Stafford County
Ohio Township, Stafford County	southwest	south	southeast	Fairview Township, Stafford County
Stafford Township, Stafford County

== Demographics ==
As of the 2020 census, there were 57 people and 27 households residing in the township. The population density was 1.6 people per square mile (0.62 people/km^{2}). There were 27 housing units. The racial makeup of the township was 98.2% White and 1.8% Native American. Hispanics or Latinos of any race were 1.8% of the population.

There were 27 households: 100% were married couples living together. The average family size was 2.52 people. 26.8% of people in the township older than 24 had a college degree, and the township had an employment rate of 75.0%.
