= Fairview Township, Stafford County, Kansas =

Township in Stafford County, Kansas, U.S.

Fairview Township
- Township
- Location within Stafford County
- Coordinates: 37.947689°N 98.517988°W
- Country: United States
- State: Kansas
- County: Stafford

Government
  - Trustee: Boyd Volker

Area
  - Total: 35.99 sq mi (93.2 km^{2})
  - Land: 35.922 sq mi (93.04 km^{2})
  - Water: 0.068 sq mi (0.18 km^{2}) 0.19%

Population (2020)
  - Total: 65
  - Density: 1.8/sq mi (0.70/km^{2})
- Time zone: UTC-6 (CST)
  - Summer (DST): UTC-5 (CDT)
- Area code: 620
- GNIS feature ID: 473604

Fairview Township is a township in Stafford County, Kansas, United States. As of the 2020 census, its population was 65.

== Geography ==
Fairview Township covers an area of 35.99 square miles (93.2 square kilometers). The North Fork Ninnescah River flows through it.

=== Communities ===
- Zenith

=== Adjacent townships ===
East Cooper Township, Stafford County
West Cooper Township, Stafford County	northwest	north	northeast	Hayes Township, Reno County
Stafford Township, Stafford County	west	self	east	Sylvia Township, Reno County
Union Township, Stafford County	southwest	south	southeast	Grove Township, Reno County
York Township, Stafford County

== Demographics ==
As of the 2020 census, there were 65 people and 35 households residing in the township. The population density was 1.8 people per square mile (0.69 people/km^{2}). There were 35 housing units. The racial makeup of the township was 90.8% White, 1.5% Native American, 4.6% from some other race, and 3.1% from two or more races. Hispanics or Latinos of any race were 7.7% of the population.

There were 35 households: 68.6% were married couples living together, 11.4% were a male householder with no spouse present, and 5.7% were a female householder with no spouse present. The average family size was 3.25 people. 25.3% of people in the township older than 24 had a college degree, and the township had an employment rate of 63.3%.
