= Hayes Township, Stafford County, Kansas =

Township in Stafford County, Kansas, U.S.

Hayes Township
- Township
- Location within Stafford County
- Coordinates: 38.12957°N 98.637709°W
- Country: United States
- State: Kansas
- County: Stafford
- Established: 1879

Government
  - Trustee: Ryan T. Witt

Area
  - Total: 36.02 sq mi (93.3 km^{2})
  - Land: 36.02 sq mi (93.3 km^{2})
  - Water: 0 sq mi (0 km^{2}) 0%

Population (2020)
  - Total: 167
  - Density: 4.64/sq mi (1.79/km^{2})
- Time zone: UTC-6 (CST)
  - Summer (DST): UTC-5 (CDT)
- Area code: 620
- GNIS feature ID: 475876

Hayes Township is a township in Stafford County, Kansas, United States. As of the 2020 census, its population was 167.

== History ==
Hayes Township was created on July 14, 1879. Eventually, Byron Township and Putnam Township would be created from it.

== Geography ==
Hayes Township covers an area of 36.02 square miles (93.3 square kilometers). Rattlesnake Creek flows through it.

=== Communities ===
- Hudson

=== Adjacent townships ===
Byron Township, Stafford County
North Seward Township, Stafford County	northwest	north
South Seward Township, Stafford County	west	self	east	Putnam Township, Stafford County
St. John Township, Stafford County	southwest	south	southeast	East Cooper Township, Stafford County
West Cooper Township, Stafford County

== Demographics ==
As of the 2020 census, there were 167 people and 125 households residing in the township. The population density was 4.64 people per square mile (1.79 people/km^{2}). There were 130 housing units. The racial makeup of the township was 95.2% White, 1.2% Native American, and 3.6% from two or more races. Hispanics or Latinos of any race were 0.6% of the population.

There were 125 households: 81.6% were married couples living together, 4.0% were a male householder with no spouse present, and 13.6% were a female householder with no spouse present. The average family size was 2.91 people. 68.4% of people in the township older than 24 had a college degree, and the township had an employment rate of 81.7%.
