= Cleveland Township, Stafford County, Kansas =

Township in Stafford County, Kansas, U.S.

Cleveland Township
- Township
- Location within Stafford County
- Coordinates: 38.040217°N 98.853665°W
- Country: United States
- State: Kansas
- County: Stafford

Government
  - Trustee: Wade Sanders

Area
  - Total: 36.163 sq mi (93.66 km^{2})
  - Land: 36.147 sq mi (93.62 km^{2})
  - Water: 0.016 sq mi (0.041 km^{2}) 0.04%

Population (2020)
  - Total: 65
  - Density: 1.8/sq mi (0.69/km^{2})
- Time zone: UTC-6 (CST)
  - Summer (DST): UTC-5 (CDT)
- Area code: 620
- GNIS feature ID: 475935

Cleveland Township is a township in Stafford County, Kansas, United States. As of the 2020 census, its population was 65.

== History ==
Cleveland Township was created from part of St. John Township.

== Geography ==
Cleveland Township covers an area of 36.163 square miles (93.66 square kilometers).

=== Adjacent townships ===
Douglas Township, Stafford County
Logan Township, Pawnee County	northwest	north	northeast	South Seward Township, Stafford County
Valley Center Township, Pawnee County	west	self	east	St. John Township, Stafford County
Farmington Township, Stafford County	southwest	south	southeast	Ohio Township, Stafford County
Richland Township, Stafford County

== Demographics ==
As of the 2020 census, there were 65 people and 14 households residing in the township. The population density was 1.8 people per square mile (0.69 people/km^{2}). There were 14 housing units. The racial makeup of the township was 95.4% White, and 4.6% from two or more races. Hispanics or Latinos of any race were 1.5% of the population.

There were 14 households: 100% were married couples living together. The average family size was 2.71 people. 72.7% of people in the township older than 24 had a college degree, and the township had an employment rate of 51.1%.
