= Zenith, Kansas =

Unincorporated community in Stafford County, KS, USA

- Unincorporated community
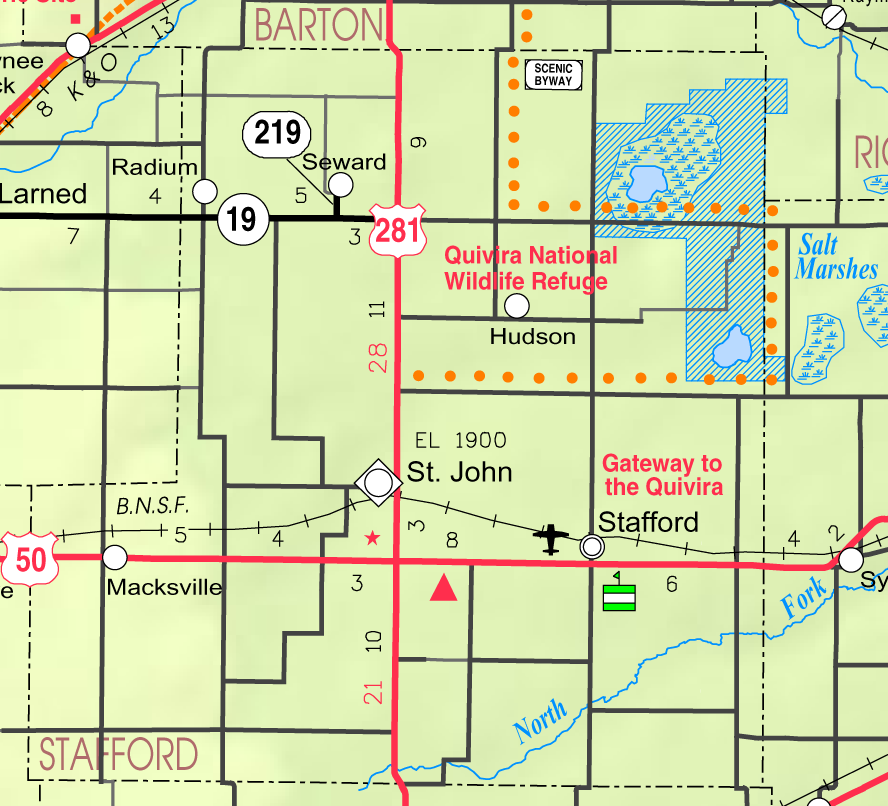
- KDOT map of Stafford County (legend)

- Location within Kansas Location within the United States
- Coordinates: 37.9572°N 98.4920°W
- Country: United States
- State: Kansas
- County: Stafford
- Elevation: 1,805 ft (550 m)
- Time zone: UTC-6 (CST)
  - Summer (DST): UTC-5 (CDT)
- Area code: 620
- FIPS code: 20-80950
- GNIS ID: 473601

Zenith is an unincorporated community in Stafford County, Kansas, United States. It is located east of Stafford, next to a railroad and U.S. Route 50 highway at NE 140th Ave.

== History ==
A post office was opened in Zenith in 1902, and remained in operation until it was discontinued in 1974.
