= Ohio Township, Stafford County, Kansas =

Township in Stafford County, Kansas, U.S.

Ohio Township
- Township
- Location within Stafford County
- Coordinates: 37.955848°N 98.747151°W
- Country: United States
- State: Kansas
- County: Stafford

Government
  - Trustee: Kurt Keesling

Area
  - Total: 36.523 sq mi (94.59 km^{2})
  - Land: 36.523 sq mi (94.59 km^{2})
  - Water: 0 sq mi (0 km^{2}) 0%

Population (2020)
  - Total: 377
  - Density: 10.3/sq mi (3.99/km^{2})
- Time zone: UTC-6 (CST)
  - Summer (DST): UTC-5 (CDT)
- Area code: 620
- GNIS feature ID: 473577

Ohio Township is a township in Stafford County, Kansas, United States. As of the 2020 census, its population was 377.

== History ==
Ohio Township was created from part of St. John Township.

== Geography ==
Ohio Township covers an area of 36.523 square miles (94.59 square kilometers). Rattlesnake Creek flows through it.

=== Communities ===
- part of St. John

=== Adjacent townships ===
St. John Township, Stafford County
Cleveland Township, Stafford County	northwest	north	northeast	West Cooper Township, Stafford County
Richland Township, Stafford County	west	self	east	Stafford Township, Stafford County
Albano Township, Stafford County	southwest	south	southeast	Union Township, Stafford County
Rose Valley Township, Stafford County

== Transportation ==
=== Major highways ===
- US-50
- US-281

== Demographics ==
As of the 2020 census, there were 377 people and 95 households residing in the township. The population density was 10.3 people per square mile (4.0 people/km^{2}). There were 122 housing units. The racial makeup of the township was 82.5% White, 2.1% Native American, 0.5% Asian, 5.6% from some other race, and 9.3% from two or more races. Hispanics or Latinos of any race were 18.6% of the population.

There were 95 households: 53.7% were married couples living together, 12.6% were a male householder with no spouse present, and 33.7% were a female householder with no spouse present. The average family size was 2.88 people. 67.7% of people in the township older than 24 had a college degree, and the township had an employment rate of 66.7%.
