= Richland Township, Stafford County, Kansas =

Township in Stafford County, Kansas, U.S.

Richland Township
- Township
- Location within Stafford County
- Coordinates: 37.956347°N 98.857862°W
- Country: United States
- State: Kansas
- County: Stafford

Government
  - Trustee: Phillip Koelsch

Area
  - Total: 36.18 sq mi (93.7 km^{2})
  - Land: 36.18 sq mi (93.7 km^{2})
  - Water: 0 sq mi (0 km^{2}) 0%

Population (2020)
  - Total: 63
  - Density: 1.7/sq mi (0.67/km^{2})
- Time zone: UTC-6 (CST)
  - Summer (DST): UTC-5 (CDT)
- Area code: 620
- GNIS feature ID: 473566

Richland Township is a township in Stafford County, Kansas, United States. As of the 2020 census, its population was 63.

== Geography ==
Richland Township covers an area of 36.18 square miles (93.7 square kilometers). Rattlesnake Creek flows through it, as well as Spring Creek.

=== Communities ===
- Dillwyn

=== Adjacent townships ===
Cleveland Township, Stafford County
Valley Center Township, Pawnee County	northwest	north	northeast	St. John Township, Stafford County
Farmington Township, Stafford County	west	self	east	Ohio Township, Stafford County
Clear Creek Township, Stafford County	southwest	south	southeast	Rose Valley Township, Stafford County
Albano Township, Stafford County

== Transportation ==
=== Major highways ===
- US-50

== Demographics ==
As of the 2020 census, there were 63 people and 33 households residing in the township. The population density was 1.7 people per square mile (0.66 people/km^{2}). There were 46 housing units. The racial makeup of the township was 96.8% White, and 3.2% from two or more races. Hispanics or Latinos of any race were 1.6% of the population.

There were 33 households: 69.7% were married couples living together and 30.3% were a male householder with no spouse present. The average family size was 3.52 people. 41.3% of people in the township older than 24 had a college degree, and the township had an employment rate of 61.7%.
