= Rose Valley Township, Kansas =

Township in Stafford County, Kansas, U.S.

Rose Valley Township
- Township
- Location within Stafford County
- Coordinates: 37.861462°N 98.756393°W
- Country: United States
- State: Kansas
- County: Stafford

Government
  - Trustee: Jason Crockett

Area
  - Total: 36.449 sq mi (94.40 km^{2})
  - Land: 36.436 sq mi (94.37 km^{2})
  - Water: 0.013 sq mi (0.034 km^{2}) 0.04%

Population (2020)
  - Total: 46
  - Density: 1.3/sq mi (0.49/km^{2})
- Time zone: UTC-6 (CST)
  - Summer (DST): UTC-5 (CDT)
- Area code: 620
- GNIS feature ID: 473578

Rose Valley Township is a township in Stafford County, Kansas, United States. As of the 2020 census, its population was 46.

== History ==
Part of Union Township was created from part of Rose Valley Township.

== Geography ==
Rose Valley Township covers an area of 36.449 square miles (94.40 square kilometers).

=== Adjacent townships ===
Ohio Township, Stafford County
Richland Township, Stafford County	northwest	north	northeast	Stafford Township, Stafford County
Albano Township, Stafford County	west	self	east	Union Township, Stafford County
Township 8, Pratt County	southwest	south
Township 7, Pratt County

== Transportation ==
=== Major highways ===
- US-281

== Demographics ==
As of the 2020 census, there were 46 people and 14 households residing in the township. The population density was 1.3 people per square mile (0.50 people/km^{2}). There were 14 housing units. The racial makeup of the township was 87.0% White, 2.2% from some other race, and 10.9% from two or more races. Hispanics or Latinos of any race were 6.5% of the population.

There were 14 households: 100% were married couples living together. The average family size was 2.93 people. 53.3% of people in the township older than 24 had a college degree, and the township had an employment rate of 66.7%.
