= Stafford Township, Kansas =

Township in Stafford County, Kansas, U.S.

Stafford Township
- Township
- Location within Stafford County
- Coordinates: 37.950652°N 98.630814°W
- Country: United States
- State: Kansas
- County: Stafford
- Established: 1879

Government
  - Trustee: David Young

Area
  - Total: 36.045 sq mi (93.36 km^{2})
  - Land: 36.036 sq mi (93.33 km^{2})
  - Water: 0.009 sq mi (0.023 km^{2}) 0.02%

Population (2020)
  - Total: 1,086
  - Density: 30.14/sq mi (11.64/km^{2})
- Time zone: UTC-6 (CST)
  - Summer (DST): UTC-5 (CDT)
- Area code: 620
- GNIS feature ID: 473583

Stafford Township is a township in Stafford County, Kansas, United States. As of the 2020 census, its population was 1,086.

== History ==
Stafford Township was created on July 14, 1879.

== Geography ==
Stafford Township covers an area of 36.045 square miles (93.36 square kilometers).

=== Communities ===
- Stafford

=== Adjacent townships ===
West Cooper Township, Stafford County
| St. John Township, Stafford County | northwest | north | northeast | East Cooper Township, Stafford County |
| Ohio Township, Stafford County | west | self | east | Fairview Township, Stafford County |
| Rose Valley Township, Stafford County | southwest | south | southeast | York Township, Stafford County |
Union Township, Stafford County

== Transportation ==
The township is home to Stafford Municipal Airport, the only airport in the county.

=== Major highways ===
- US-50

== Demographics ==
As of the 2020 census, there were 1,086 people and 367 households residing in the township. The population density was 30.14 people per square mile (11.64 people/km^{2}). There were 576 housing units. The racial makeup of the township was 87.9% White, 0.8% Black or African American, 0.7% Native American, 0.6% Asian, 2.3% from some other race, and 7.6% from two or more races. Hispanics or Latinos of any race were 8.4% of the population.

There were 367 households: 47.4% were married couples living together, 26.2% had a male householder with no spouse present, and 21.3% had a female householder with no spouse present. The average family size was 2.79 people. 32.5% of people in the township older than 24 had a college degree, and the township had an employment rate of 55.2%.
