= Neola, Kansas =

Unincorporated community in Stafford County, Kansas

Coordinates: 37°52′10″N 98°30′32″W

Neola is an unincorporated community in Stafford County, Kansas, United States. It is located southeast of Stafford, next to a former railroad at SE 130th Ave and Neola Rd.

== History ==
A post office was opened in Neola in 1878 and remained in operation until it was discontinued in 1918.
