= Quivira National Wildlife Refuge =

Wildlife refuge in Kansas, United States

- IUCN category IV (habitat/species management area)
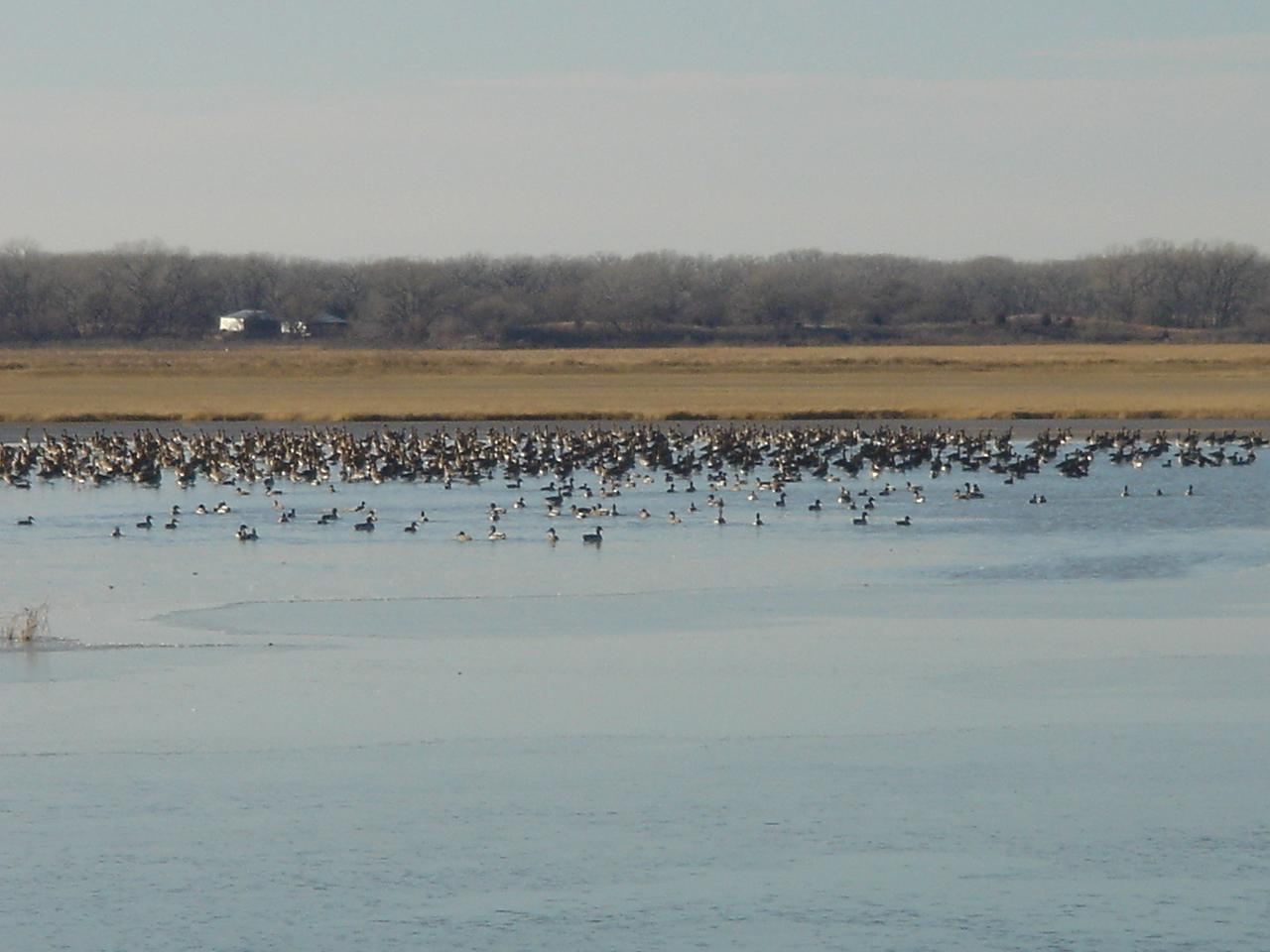
- Birds on one of Quivira's salt marshes

- Location within Kansas
- Location: South central Kansas, United States
- Nearest city: Stafford
- Coordinates: 38°11′00″N 98°30′31″W
- Website: Quivira National Wildlife Refuge

Ramsar Wetland
- Designated: 2 December 2002
- Reference no.: 1172

Quivira National Wildlife Refuge in south central Kansas, United States, is a wildlife refuge that includes rare inland marshes. Located near the town of Stafford, it lies mostly in northeastern Stafford County, but small parts extend into southwestern Rice and northwestern Reno Counties. Its proximity to the Central Flyway migration route and the salt marshes on the refuge combine to endow the refuge with a large variety of birds. Many of these birds are uncommon in other parts of Kansas or even the central part of the continent.

On January 29, 2008, Quivira NWR and Cheyenne Bottoms Wildlife Area were jointly named as one of the 8 Wonders of Kansas. Quivira NWR is one of 29 places in the United States on the Ramsar list as a wetland of international importance.

== Name ==
The name Quivira derives from a fabled Native American city of gold. In 1541 Spanish conquistador Francisco Vásquez de Coronado led an expedition onto the Great Plains of Kansas searching for wealth. He spent a month with the Quivirans, the ancestors of the Wichita tribe, but returned to New Mexico without finding any gold.

== Description ==
A map of Quivira National Wildlife Refuge.

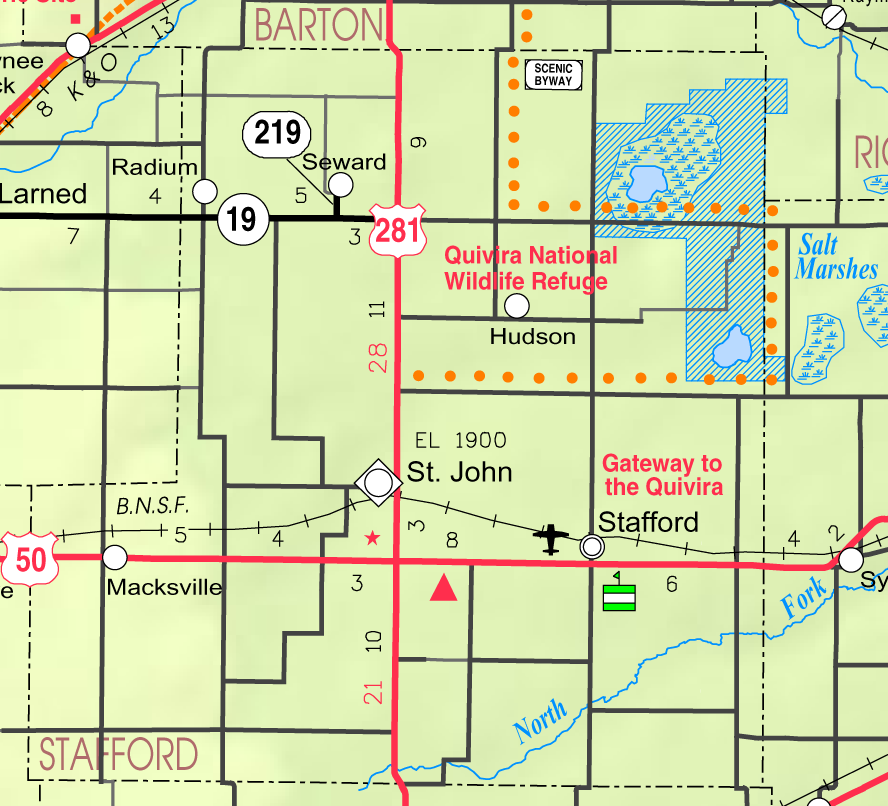
KDOT map of Stafford County (legend)

Quivira National Wildlife Refuge was created in 1955 and in 1998 the refuge reached its present size of 22,135 acres (89.58 km^{2}). The Refuge is bisected by Rattlesnake Creek from which it receives the main flow of water. It has two shallow lakes, Big Salt Marsh and Little Salt Marsh, that have attracted migratory birds and animals for centuries. Twenty-one miles (34 km) of canals have been constructed to create additional marshland. The Refuge has 34 wetlands from 10 to 1,500 acres (6.1 km^{2}) in size totaling 7,000 acres (28 km^{2}). The wetlands have high salt levels.

Quivira also has about 13,000 acres (53 km^{2}) of sand dunes covered with prairie grasses. The sand prairie has species from both the eastern Tallgrass prairie and the western Shortgrass prairie or steppe. About 1,500 acres (6.1 km^{2}) of the Refuge is wooded with trees such as cottonwood, black locust, and eastern redcedar. Another 1,200 acres (4.9 km^{2}) of Refuge land is farmed with winter wheat and milo. A portion of the crop is left in the fields for wildlife. Cattle are also grazed on part of the Refuge to simulate grazing by bison, which are no longer present. Bison grazing was a traditional component of the ecology of the region.

Two roads, one 14 miles (23 km) and the other 4 miles (6.4 km) in length, afford opportunities for wildlife viewing. A 1.2-mile (1.9 km) nature trail passes through woodlands, grasslands, and across a marsh on an elevated boardwalk. Birdhouse Boulevard is a 1,000-foot (300 m) wheel-chair accessible trail lined with birdhouses. A wildlife observation tower is located on the south side of Little Salt Marsh. Two photography blinds and a spotting scope aid in observing wildlife. Hunting for small game and waterfowl is permitted on 8,000 acres (32 km^{2}) of the refuge. A "Kid's Fishing Pond" is located near the Visitor Center which has interpretative displays. Fishing is permitted in the marshes. Bicycles and horses are permitted on established trails and roads. Boats are prohibited.

== Wildlife ==
Most of the 344 species of birds are seasonal. The Christmas bird count in 2010 counted 43,548 birds of 95 species. More than one-half of this total were snow geese many of which winter on the Refuge. Quivira also has mule and white-tail deer, raccoon, coyote, badger, skunk, two species of lizard, opossum, bobcat, red and swift foxes, six species of turtle, beaver, muskrat, porcupine, prairie dog, and wild turkey.

=== Spring and Summer ===
Shorebirds, pelicans, and gulls stop over at the refuge en route to their Spring nesting grounds. Plovers, avocets, stilts, ibis, and endangered least terns nest on the refuge during the spring and summer. Whooping cranes stop over on their way north to nesting areas.

=== Fall ===
800,000 geese and ducks pass through Quivira NWR en route to the Gulf Coast and Mexico. In addition, endangered whooping cranes occasionally visit the refuge en route to their wintering grounds in Texas.

=== Winter ===
Both bald and golden eagles spend the winter on the refuge.

=== Accidentals ===
These species have been seen on rare occasions on the refuge:

- Great flamingo
- Surf scoter
- Greater roadrunner
- Pileated woodpecker
- Roseate spoonbill

== Images ==
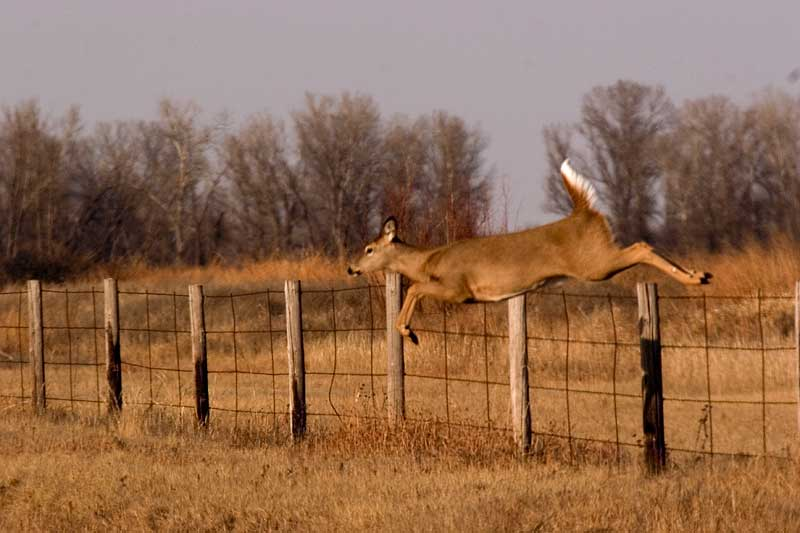
Doe jumping over a fence.

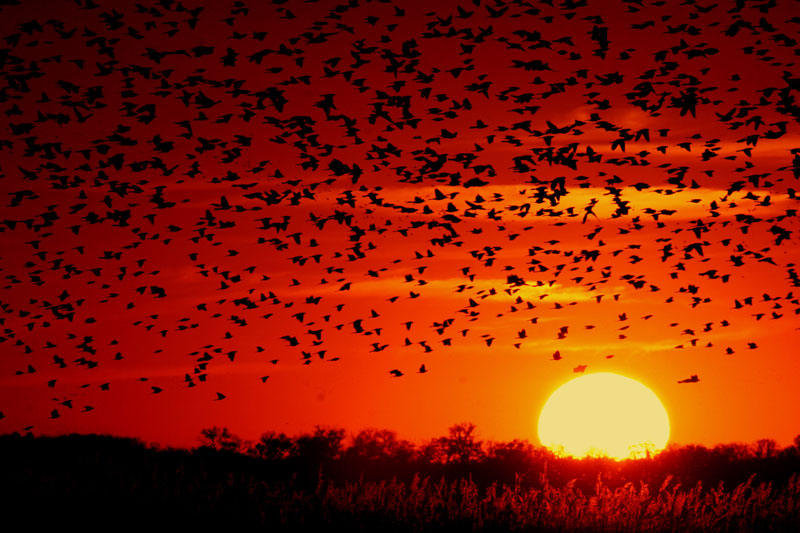
Flock of red-winged blackbirds flying into the sunset

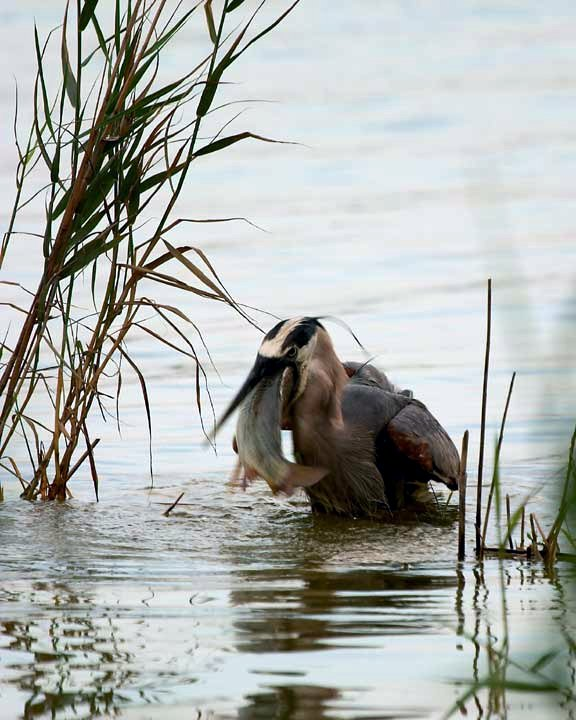
Great blue heron with a fish

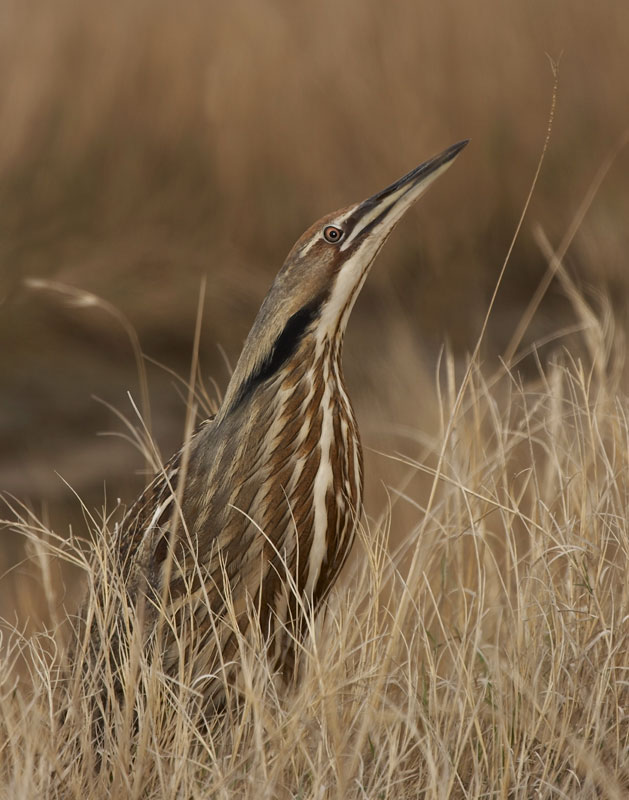
American bittern

== See also ==
- List of Kansas state parks
- List of lakes, reservoirs, and dams in Kansas
- List of rivers of Kansas
