= South Seward Township, Kansas =

Township in Stafford County, Kansas, U.S.

South Seward Township
- Township
- Location within Stafford County
- Coordinates: 38.122966°N 98.73855°W
- Country: United States
- State: Kansas
- County: Stafford
- Established: 1948

Government
  - Trustee: Marc Fischer

Area
  - Total: 35.968 sq mi (93.16 km^{2})
  - Land: 35.939 sq mi (93.08 km^{2})
  - Water: 0.029 sq mi (0.075 km^{2}) 0.08%

Population (2020)
  - Total: 41
  - Density: 1.1/sq mi (0.44/km^{2})
- Time zone: UTC-6 (CST)
  - Summer (DST): UTC-5 (CDT)
- Area code: 620
- GNIS feature ID: 473576

South Seward Township is a township in Stafford County, Kansas, United States. As of the 2020 census, its population was 41.

== History ==
South Seward Township was created in 1948 after being separated from Seward Township, which would later be renamed North Seward Township.

== Geography ==
South Seward Township covers an area of 35.968 square miles (93.16 square kilometers).

=== Adjacent townships ===
North Seward Township, Stafford County
Lincoln Township, Stafford County	northwest	north	northeast	Byron Township, Stafford County
Douglas Township, Stafford County	west	self	east	Hayes Township, Stafford County
Cleveland Township, Stafford County	southwest	south	southeast	West Cooper Township, Stafford County
St. John Township, Stafford County

== Transportation ==
=== Major highways ===
- US-281
- K-19

== Demographics ==
As of the 2020 census, there were 41 people and 10 households residing in the township. The population density was 1.1 people per square mile (0.42 people/km^{2}). There were 49 housing units. The racial makeup of the township was 87.8% White and 12.2% from two or more races. Hispanics or Latinos of any race were 2.4% of the population.

There were 10 households: 50.0% were married couples living together and 50.0% had a male householder with no spouse present. The average family size was 3.20 people. 60.0% of people in the township older than 24 had a college degree, and the township had an employment rate of 86.7%.
