= Lincoln Township, Edwards County, Kansas =

Lincoln Township
- Township
- Location in Edwards County
- Coordinates: 37°49′32″N 099°04′40″W
- Country: United States
- State: Kansas
- County: Edwards

Area
  - Total: 74.46 sq mi (192.85 km^{2})
  - Land: 74.46 sq mi (192.85 km^{2})
  - Water: 0 sq mi (0 km^{2}) 0%
- Elevation: 2,073 ft (632 m)

Population (2020)
  - Total: 112
  - Density: 1.50/sq mi (0.581/km^{2})
- GNIS feature ID: 0473555

Lincoln Township is a township in Edwards County, Kansas, United States. As of the 2020 census, its population was 112.

== Geography ==
Lincoln Township covers an area of 74.46 square miles (192.9 km^{2}) and contains no incorporated settlements. According to the USGS, it contains one cemetery, Providence.
