= Stafford County, Kansas =

County in Kansas, United States

- County
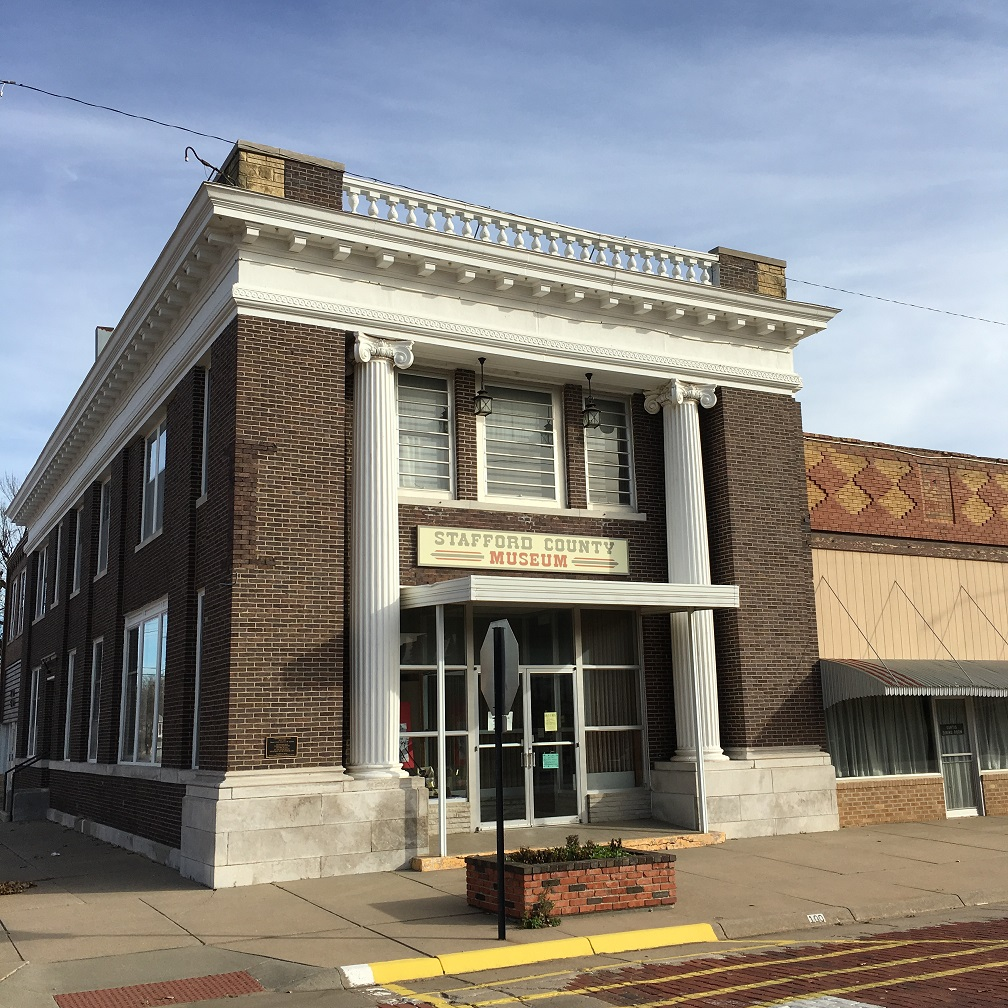
- Stafford County Museum in Stafford (2017)

- Location within the U.S. state of Kansas
- Coordinates: 38°04′00″N 98°43′00″W
- Country: United States
- State: Kansas
- Founded: 1879
- Named for: Lewis Stafford
- Seat: St. John
- Largest city: St. John

Area
  - Total: 795 sq mi (2,060 km^{2})
  - Land: 792 sq mi (2,050 km^{2})
  - Water: 2.9 sq mi (7.5 km^{2}) 0.4%

Population (2020)
  - Total: 4,072
  - Estimate (2025): 4,005 ▼
  - Density: 5.1/sq mi (2.0/km^{2})
- Time zone: UTC−6 (Central)
  - Summer (DST): UTC−5 (CDT)
- Congressional district: 4th
- Website: StaffordCounty.org

Stafford County is a county located in the U.S. state of Kansas. Its county seat is St. John. As of the 2020 census, the county population was 4,072. The county is named in honor of Lewis Stafford, a captain of Company E, First Kansas Infantry, who died at the Battle of Young's Point during the Civil War.

== History ==
=== 19th century ===
The boundaries of Stafford County were defined by the Kansas Legislature of 1870 but for several years, the county remained unorganized. The Legislature of 1875, with the intention of obliterating the county from the map, gave the territory in Stafford County to other counties. They gave the portion in Range 15 West to Pawnee County; the portion included in Ranges 11, 12, 13 and 14 to Barton County; and the south half of the county, excepting the portion in Range 15, was added to Pratt County. But after each of the counties had taken its part, a strip six miles wide and twelve miles long (two townships) remained as Stafford County. This was the condition of the county until April 25, 1879, when, by a decision of the Supreme Court, the act of the Legislature dividing the county was declared unconstitutional and the county was restored to its original boundaries. Stafford County was organized in 1879.

Amidst this legal turmoil, settlers began to establish themselves in the county. Among the earliest pioneers was W. R. Hoole, who in May 1874, laid claim to land in what would become Stafford County, followed by John Birbeck, who erected the county's first frame house shortly after and broke the first prairie in the county in 1875. The first child was born in the county in 1875, also to W. R. Hoole and his wife. A short-lived attempt at manufacturing salt at Salt Marsh, in the northeastern part of the county, was undertaken in 1876. The marsh was ultimately found to be better used as a pasture for livestock.

In addition to individual settlers, a sizable Mormon settlement, known as Zion Valley, was established near St. John in the spring of 1875. Led by William Bickerton, this community established the county's first post office and erected a frame temple before internal disputes led to its dissolution and the temple's conversion into a commercial establishment.

Educational infrastructure also began to take shape with the construction of the county's first schoolhouse, the Hoole Schoolhouse, in 1876, with Miss Ella Miller serving as its inaugural teacher.

The early economy of Stafford County was heavily reliant on the gathering of buffalo bones, which were abundant across the region. This industry proved, however, to be short-lived, as the easily accessible bone deposits were quickly depleted.

== Geography ==
According to the U.S. Census Bureau, the county has a total area of 795 square miles (2,060 km^{2}), of which 792 square miles (2,050 km^{2}) is land and 2.9 square miles (7.5 km^{2}) (0.4%) is water.

=== Adjacent counties ===
- Barton County (north)
- Rice County (northeast)
- Reno County (east)
- Pratt County (south)
- Edwards County (west)
- Pawnee County (west)

=== National protected area ===
- Quivira National Wildlife Refuge (part)

== Demographics ==
Historical population
Census	Pop.	Note	%±
1880	4,755		—
1890	7,520		58.1%
1900	9,829		30.7%
1910	12,510		27.3%
1920	11,559		−7.6%
1930	10,460		−9.5%
1940	10,487		0.3%
1950	8,816		−15.9%
1960	7,451		−15.5%
1970	5,943		−20.2%
1980	5,694		−4.2%
1990	5,365		−5.8%
2000	4,789		−10.7%
2010	4,437		−7.4%
2020	4,072		−8.2%
2025 (est.)	4,005	▼	−1.6%
U.S. Decennial Census; 1790-1960 1900-1990; 1990-2000 2010-2020

=== Racial and ethnic composition ===
Stafford County, Kansas – Racial and ethnic composition Note: the US Census treats Hispanic/Latino as an ethnic category. This table excludes Latinos from the racial categories and assigns them to a separate category. Hispanics/Latinos may be of any race.
Race / Ethnicity (NH = Non-Hispanic)	Pop 1980	Pop 1990	Pop 2000	Pop 2010	Pop 2020	% 1980	% 1990	% 2000	% 2010	% 2020
White alone (NH)	5,579	5,210	4,455	3,805	3,364	97.98%	97.11%	93.03%	85.76%	82.61%
Black or African American alone (NH)	11	10	7	10	14	0.19%	0.19%	0.15%	0.23%	0.34%
Native American or Alaska Native alone (NH)	6	24	13	30	21	0.11%	0.45%	0.27%	0.68%	0.52%
Asian alone (NH)	11	9	6	16	12	0.19%	0.17%	0.13%	0.36%	0.29%
Native Hawaiian or Pacific Islander alone (NH)	x	x	0	1	0	x	x	0.00%	0.02%	0.00%
Other race alone (NH)	7	0	0	0	2	0.12%	0.00%	0.00%	0.00%	0.05%
Mixed race or Multiracial (NH)	x	x	49	46	156	x	x	1.02%	1.04%	3.83%
Hispanic or Latino (any race)	80	112	259	529	503	1.40%	2.09%	5.41%	11.92%	12.35%
Total	5,694	5,365	4,789	4,437	4,072	100.00%	100.00%	100.00%	100.00%	100.00%

=== 2020 census ===
As of the 2020 census, the county had a population of 4,072. The median age was 44.2 years. 23.5% of residents were under the age of 18 and 22.5% of residents were 65 years of age or older. For every 100 females there were 101.4 males, and for every 100 females age 18 and over there were 100.4 males age 18 and over.

The racial makeup of the county was 86.0% White, 0.3% Black or African American, 0.9% American Indian and Alaska Native, 0.3% Asian, 0.0% Native Hawaiian and Pacific Islander, 4.3% from some other race, and 8.2% from two or more races. Hispanic or Latino residents of any race comprised 12.4% of the population.

0.0% of residents lived in urban areas, while 100.0% lived in rural areas.

There were 1,739 households in the county, of which 28.6% had children under the age of 18 living with them and 21.2% had a female householder with no spouse or partner present. About 31.3% of all households were made up of individuals and 16.9% had someone living alone who was 65 years of age or older.

There were 2,088 housing units, of which 16.7% were vacant. Among occupied housing units, 80.3% were owner-occupied and 19.7% were renter-occupied. The homeowner vacancy rate was 2.3% and the rental vacancy rate was 10.2%.

=== 2000 census ===
As of the census of 2000, there were 4,789 people, 2,010 households, and 1,294 families residing in the county. The population density was 6 people per square mile (2.3 people/km^{2}). There were 2,458 housing units at an average density of 3 per square mile (1.2/km^{2}). The racial makeup of the county was 94.97% White, 0.15% Black or African American, 0.38% Native American, 0.13% Asian, 2.97% from other races, and 1.42% from two or more races. 5.41% of the population were Hispanic or Latino of any race.

There were 2,010 households, out of which 29.90% had children under the age of 18 living with them, 55.90% were married couples living together, 5.90% had a female householder with no husband present, and 35.60% were non-families. 33.00% of all households were made up of individuals, and 17.20% had someone living alone who was 65 years of age or older. The average household size was 2.34 and the average family size was 2.99.

In the county, the population was spread out, with 26.30% under the age of 18, 5.40% from 18 to 24, 24.60% from 25 to 44, 22.50% from 45 to 64, and 21.20% who were 65 years of age or older. The median age was 41 years. For every 100 females there were 95.20 males. For every 100 females age 18 and over, there were 91.40 males.

The median income for a household in the county was $31,107, and the median income for a family was $38,235. Males had a median income of $27,328 versus $21,063 for females. The per capita income for the county was $16,409. About 8.70% of families and 11.80% of the population were below the poverty line, including 15.20% of those under age 18 and 8.90% of those age 65 or over.

== Government ==
Stafford County is often carried by Republican candidates. The last time they have been carried by a Democratic candidate was in 1976 by Jimmy Carter.

=== Presidential elections ===
Presidential election results

United States presidential election results for Stafford County, Kansas
Year	Republican		Democratic		Third party(ies)	
Year	No.	%	No.	%	No.	%
1888	975	47.51%	483	23.54%	594	28.95%
1892	840	39.25%	0	0.00%	1,300	60.75%
1896	710	35.34%	1,276	63.51%	23	1.14%
1900	1,055	46.81%	1,139	50.53%	60	2.66%
1904	1,419	63.12%	585	26.02%	244	10.85%
1908	1,334	50.99%	1,135	43.39%	147	5.62%
1912	422	16.14%	1,094	41.85%	1,098	42.00%
1916	1,812	41.87%	2,148	49.63%	368	8.50%
1920	2,779	70.04%	1,057	26.64%	132	3.33%
1924	3,100	68.58%	957	21.17%	463	10.24%
1928	3,278	75.27%	1,025	23.54%	52	1.19%
1932	1,945	41.23%	2,651	56.19%	122	2.59%
1936	1,939	37.50%	3,212	62.12%	20	0.39%
1940	2,795	52.17%	2,509	46.84%	53	0.99%
1944	2,493	56.25%	1,908	43.05%	31	0.70%
1948	2,304	51.74%	2,049	46.01%	100	2.25%
1952	3,162	71.28%	1,174	26.47%	100	2.25%
1956	2,728	68.37%	1,242	31.13%	20	0.50%
1960	2,531	65.54%	1,305	33.79%	26	0.67%
1964	1,516	41.64%	2,087	57.32%	38	1.04%
1968	1,851	55.75%	1,205	36.30%	264	7.95%
1972	2,200	70.35%	844	26.99%	83	2.65%
1976	1,430	45.22%	1,659	52.47%	73	2.31%
1980	1,865	62.67%	872	29.30%	239	8.03%
1984	2,062	69.71%	844	28.53%	52	1.76%
1988	1,532	55.95%	1,121	40.94%	85	3.10%
1992	1,064	38.55%	777	28.15%	919	33.30%
1996	1,604	63.03%	651	25.58%	290	11.39%
2000	1,546	70.27%	567	25.77%	87	3.95%
2004	1,649	75.43%	506	23.15%	31	1.42%
2008	1,495	72.08%	542	26.13%	37	1.78%
2012	1,385	75.31%	404	21.97%	50	2.72%
2016	1,490	78.59%	304	16.03%	102	5.38%
2020	1,645	80.88%	357	17.55%	32	1.57%
2024	1,548	81.09%	326	17.08%	35	1.83%

=== Laws ===
Although the Kansas Constitution was amended in 1986 to allow the sale of alcoholic liquor by the individual drink with the approval of voters, Stafford County remained a prohibition, or "dry", county until an election in 2016 when this prohibition was removed by 1,304 to 535, 71% of the vote.

== Education ==
=== Unified school districts ===
- Stafford USD 349
- St. John-Hudson USD 350
- Macksville USD 351

== Communities ==
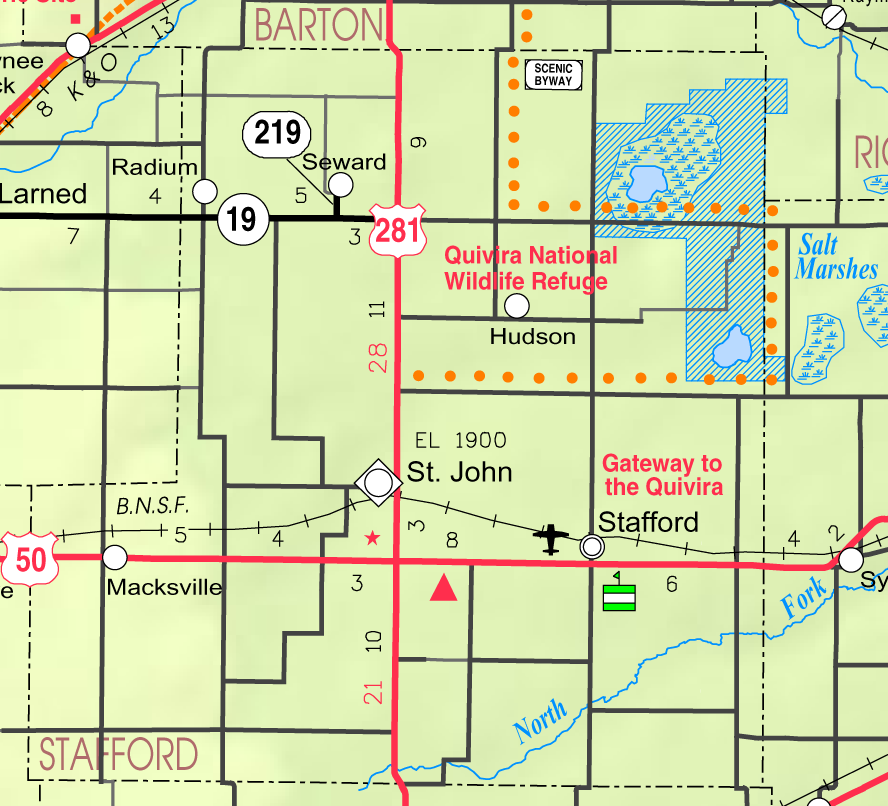
2005 map of Stafford County (map legend)

List of townships / incorporated cities / unincorporated communities / extinct former communities within Stafford County.

=== Cities ===
- Hudson
- Macksville
- Radium
- Seward
- Stafford
- St. John (county seat)

=== Unincorporated communities ===
- Dillwyn
- Neola
- Zenith

=== Townships ===
Stafford County is divided into twenty-one townships. None of the cities within the county are considered governmentally independent, and all figures for the townships include those of the cities. In the following table, the population center is the largest city (or cities) included in that township's population total, if it is of a significant size.

Sources: 2000 U.S. Gazetteer from the U.S. Census Bureau.
Township	FIPS	Population center	Population	Population density /km^{2} (/sq mi)	Land area km^{2} (sq mi)	Water area km^{2} (sq mi)	Water %	Geographic coordinates
Albano	00800		56	1 (2)	94 (36)	0 (0)	0%	37°52′43″N 98°51′43″W
Byron	09825		80	1 (2)	94 (36)	0 (0)	0.07%	38°12′50″N 98°38′7″W
Clear Creek	13825		36	0 (1)	93 (36)	0 (0)	0%	37°50′57″N 98°57′31″W
Cleveland	14125		68	1 (2)	93 (36)	0 (0)	0.04%	38°2′11″N 98°52′2″W
Douglas	18375		138	1 (4)	93 (36)	0 (0)	0%	38°8′16″N 98°52′2″W
East Cooper	19350		90	1 (3)	92 (36)	1 (0)	0.75%	38°2′43″N 98°31′6″W
Fairview	22675		98	1 (3)	93 (36)	0 (0)	0%	37°56′52″N 98°31′4″W
Farmington	23250		591	6 (16)	93 (36)	0 (0)	0%	37°57′30″N 98°58′2″W
Hayes	31025		212	2 (6)	93 (36)	0 (0)	0%	38°7′20″N 98°38′49″W
Lincoln	41225		113	1 (3)	93 (36)	0 (0)	0.02%	38°12′38″N 98°52′2″W
North Seward	51375		186	2 (5)	93 (36)	0 (0)	0.03%	38°12′36″N 98°45′27″W
Ohio	52475		409	4 (11)	95 (36)	0 (0)	0%	37°58′40″N 98°45′7″W
Putnam	58050		19	0 (0)	182 (70)	5 (2)	2.91%	38°10′26″N 98°31′51″W
Richland	59650		70	1 (2)	94 (36)	0 (0)	0%	37°57′49″N 98°51′12″W
Rose Valley	61300		74	1 (2)	94 (36)	0 (0)	0%	37°51′41″N 98°44′19″W
St. John	62300		1,037	11 (29)	94 (36)	0 (0)	0.07%	38°0′58″N 98°45′21″W
South Seward	66975		55	1 (2)	93 (36)	0 (0)	0.09%	38°8′11″N 98°44′36″W
Stafford	67800		1,291	14 (36)	93 (36)	0 (0)	0%	37°57′40″N 98°36′50″W
Union	72450		41	0 (1)	93 (36)	0 (0)	0.09%	37°52′31″N 98°37′40″W
West Cooper	76875		64	1 (2)	93 (36)	0 (0)	0.14%	38°2′37″N 98°38′9″W
York	80800		61	1 (2)	93 (36)	0 (0)	0.27%	37°52′14″N 98°31′9″W

== See also ==
- National Register of Historic Places listings in Stafford County, Kansas

Community information for Kansas

- Kansas locations by per capita income
- List of counties in Kansas
- List of townships in Kansas
- List of cities in Kansas
- List of unincorporated communities in Kansas
- List of ghost towns in Kansas
