= Rattlesnake Creek (Kansas) =

River in Kansas, United States

Rattlesnake Creek Salt Creek
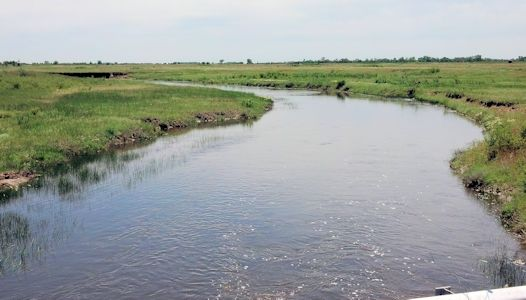
- Rattlesnake Creek near Zenith, Kansas

Location
- Country: United States
- State: Kansas
- Region: High Plains

Physical characteristics
- Source
  - location: Near Kiowa, High Plains, Kansas, United States
  - coordinates: 37°28′30″N 099°46′35″W
  - elevation: 1,729 ft (527 m)
- Mouth: Arkansas River
  - location: Near Sterling, Kansas, United States
  - coordinates: 38°12′59″N 098°30′00″W
  - elevation: 527 ft (161 m)
- Length: 95 mi (153 km), Northeast-Southwest

Basin features
- River system: Arkansas River watershed

Rattlesnake Creek is an approximately 95 mile stream that is a tributary to the Arkansas River in central Kansas. The head of the stream is in northern Kiowa County and it flows northeast through Edwards and Stafford Counties before converging with the Arkansas River in Rice County. The stream flows through Quivira National Wildlife Refuge dividing the refuge in half. The stream was officially named Rattlesnake Creek in 1971 by the Department of Interior; before 1971 it was called either Rattlesnake Creek, Salt Creek, or West Fork Rattlesnake Creek.

== See also ==
- List of rivers of Kansas
