= Heaven and Hell (Kardec book) =

Book written by Allan Kardec

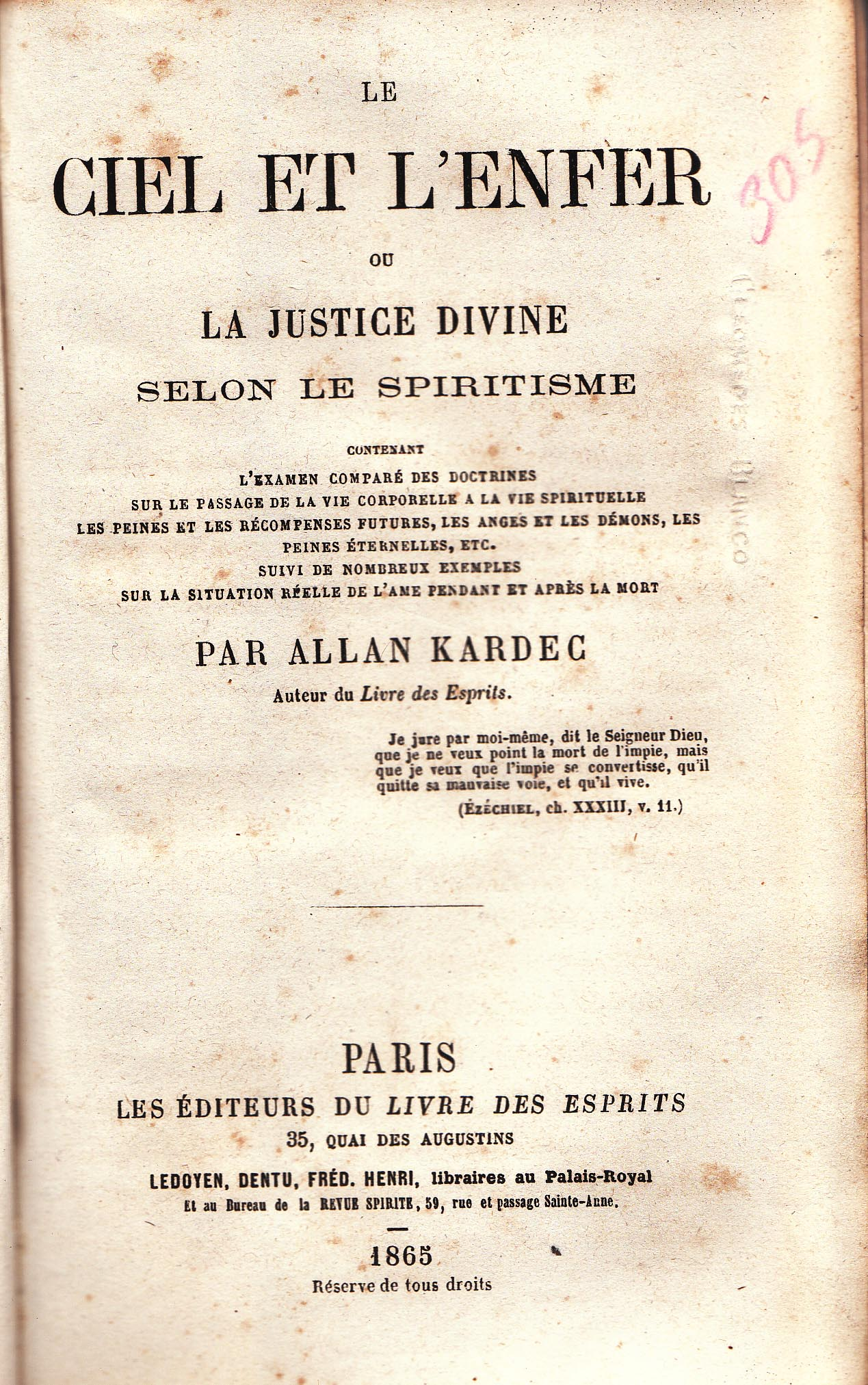
- Author: Allan Kardec
- Original title: Le Ciel et l'Enfer
- Language: French
- Genre: Religion
- Publication date: 1865

Heaven and Hell (French: Le Ciel et l'Enfer) is an 1865 book by Allan Kardec, the fourth tome of the fundamental works of Spiritism. Its name was intentionally taken from a previous book by Emanuel Swedenborg, it was also subtitled "Divine Justice According to Spiritism". It is divided into two parts named "The Doctrine" and "The Examples".

The first part explains the different view Spiritism has on the subject, stating that both "Heaven" (happiness in the afterlife) and "Hell" (punishment in the afterlife) are misconcepts, that the state of the spirits after their death is not definitive and that there is always hope, even for the crudest criminal. This is also where Kardec explains in detail why and how "good people" are doomed to suffer and why one should not take one's own life.

The second part is a series of interviews with spirits of deceased people, thus exemplifying the working truth of the doctrine previously detailed. Most of the examples cited are of people now long-forgotten and have become quite useless. The books are most cherished, however, for the profound morality expressed in the first part.

Heaven and Hell is the second most popular book among the Fundamental Works of Spiritism.

== See also ==
- Spiritism
- The Spirits' Book
- The Gospel According to Spiritism
- The Genesis According to Spiritism
- The Book on Mediums
