= The Genesis According to Spiritism =

Book by Allan Kardec

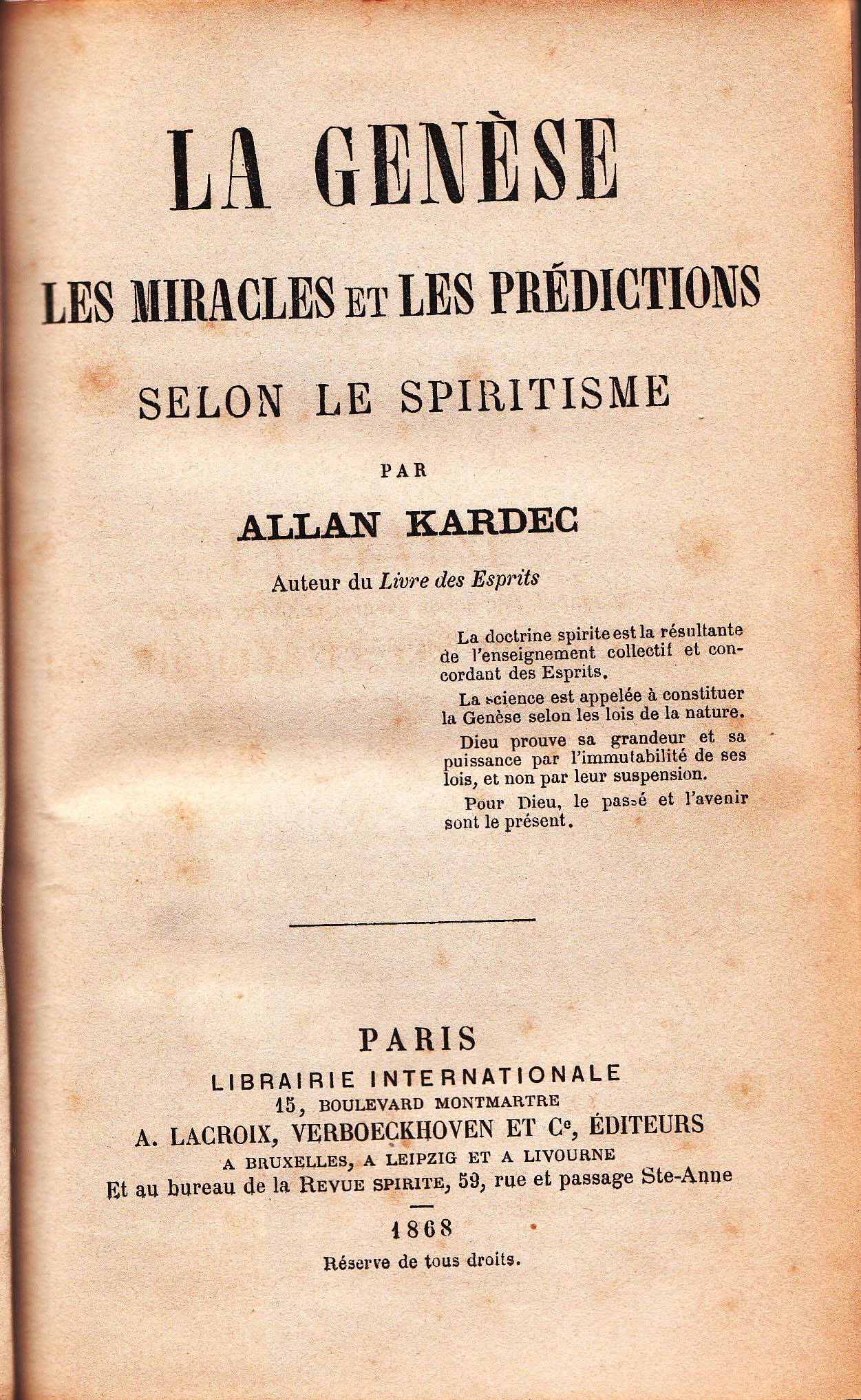

The Genesis, Miracles and Premonition According to Spiritism (La Genèse, les Miracles et les Prédictions selon le Spiritisme in the original French) was the last book published (1868) by Allan Kardec, just before his death. It tries to reconcile science and religion, and develops a series of important scientific and philosophical topics, relating them to Spiritism.

== Contents ==
The Genesis contains diverse articles on the creation of the universe, the formation of the world, the origins of spirits and the role of divine intervention in the order of nature.

=== Chapter I: Character of the Spiritist Revelation ===
Kardec argues that Spiritism is a "third revelation", the first being that of God to Moses and the second, the coming of Christ. This first chapter is a thorough rationalisation of the Spiritist theory and an attempt to justify it in face of harsh criticism:

They accuse it [Spiritism] of relationship with magic and sorcery; but forget that Astronomy has Astrology as an elder sister, not much removed from us."(#19)

=== Chapter II: God ===
The Spiritist view of god

=== Chapter III: The Good and the Evil ===
Good and evil are seen as inherent to human nature because they are both manifestations of our pursuit of perfection. "Good" things come from the use of intellect while "bad" things come from the prevalence of instinct.

=== Chapter IV: The Scientific Note in Genesis ===
Argues that scientific advancement is ultimately a human attempt to understand God and that the conflict between religion and science exists because most religions have surrendered to the will of power while science is blind to the spirituality of man. Approves a harmony of science and religion.

=== Chapter V: Systems of the Ancient and Modern Worlds ===
Explains that the (mis)conceptions about the world originated from the scarcity of information available to man in the past and that, as science advances, our worldview will change dramatically, affected by it.

=== Chapter VI: General Uranography ===
An essay, attributed to the spirit of Galileo and signed by "C.F." (probably Camille Flammarion) presents a description of the universe as understood at the time. Contains some interesting insights which were either original or very novel:

- that there are regions in space that are empty of stars (the space between the galaxies, which is called "deserts of space"),
- that countless of other planets existed beyond the Solar System,
- that the Milky Way was only one of many other galaxies,
- that most planets, if not all, were inhabited;
- that planets are not immutable, but change over long periods of time and eventually disappear.

=== Chapter VII: Geological Outline of the Earth ===
Attempts to reconcile the then recent science of geology with legends from the Bible and from other ancient peoples. Accepts the flood as fact and ignores ice ages, attributing phenomena that are now known to have been caused by the latter as evidences of the former.

=== Chapter VIII: Theories of the Earth ===
Challenges, debunks or doubts many other oddball theories that circulated among occultists of the time. An entire section is dedicated to explain that the Earth does not have a "soul".

=== Chapter IX: Revolutions of the Globe ===
Describes cataclysms that affected life overall, failing to mention any that were not already known at the time.

=== Chapter X: Organic Genesis ===
Describes how life on Earth could have formed. This chapter accepts spontaneous generation as fact: a phenomenon that took place every day (which was according to mainstream scientific thinking of that time, only to be displaced decades later by the work of Louis Pasteur).

=== Chapter XI: Spiritual Genesis ===
Explains how spirits were (and are) created and to what purpose.

=== Chapter XII: Mosaic Genesis ===
Explains why the tale of the creation found in the Book of Genesis is contradicted by science.

=== Chapter XIII: Miracles According to Spiritism ===
The second part explains what a miracle is and discusses under which conditions it should happen.

==== Character of a Miracle ====
After describing what a miracle should be (both according to the popular conception and the theology of Christianity, Kardec argues (with the Spirits on his side) that such a thing does not and cannot exist:

"...considering that God does not do anything for fancy, we are inclined to the following opinion: As miracles are not necessary for the glory of God, nothing in the Universe ever goes against the laws of nature. God does not work miracles because, as His laws are perfect, He has no reason to derogate or suspend them. If facts are found that we cannot understand, it is just because we are in want of the knowledge necessary to understand them."

Regarding miraculous cures, Kardec wisely states that these, if frequent enough, would have been a hindrance to the development of mankind. If people could be miraculously cured man would not pursue knowledge. Therefore, as man is steadily progressing towards more and more knowledge, Kardec infers that these miracles are rare indeed (as they are not affecting the march of scientific progress). This reasoning is used as an explanation for the observed scarcity of true miracles. Finally, Kardec argues that most people claiming to work miraculous cures are charlatans.

=== Chapter XIV: Fluids ===
According to contemporary science, there was a third nature, besides matter and energy, that was both immaterial, undetectable and capable of acting upon both matter and energy; as energy is capable of acting on matter and matter, of affecting energy. Such third kind was the basis for most religious theories and this theory was the bond that still allowed science and religion to have some common ground. In this chapter, Kardec explains "fluids" according to Spiritism and uses them to explain how spiritual phenomena worked.

=== Chapter XV: The Miracles of the Gospel ===
Why and how did Jesus work wonders. This chapter states that most of the "miracles" narrated by the Gospels were either natural phenomena or manifestations of spirits.

=== Chapter XVI: The Prophecies in the Light of Spiritism ===
The third and shortest part deals with the possibility of foretelling the future, its possible consequences for mankind, and why God would allow it to happen.

=== Chapter XVIII: The Time Has Arrived ===
The final chapter, one of the last things Kardec published in life, is in itself a prophecy about the future of Spiritism, containing the following claims:

- The world was going to suffer the most dramatic change it ever experienced, and that this change would not be a cataclysm but the complete disruption of the beliefs of man, prompting the establishment of a new faith, capable of harmonizing with science, to prevent science "alone" from leading mankind to madness.
- The changes would affect the world as a whole and blur the borders between nations and peoples.
- The crisis would lead to great advancement of mankind, eliminating most causes of suffering and turning our planet into a higher type of world (most Spiritists believe our world is one of punishment for morally debased, but intelligent spirits).
- The crisis will prompt a redefinition of many keystones of man's political organizations in terms of ethics.
- After the crisis, or as a consequence of it, man will be bodily different from its current shape.
- After the crisis there will not be any organized religions left, people will be all either free-thinkers or theists and most will believe the central tenets of Spiritism.
- We won't be able to detect the changes while they happen because they will be deep, but slow, and will take centuries to fully develop. Future generations will look unto us as an era of permanent turmoil, but not all of us will live realizing this.
- Most of the push for the change will not come from scientific improvement, but from moral progress.

== See also ==
- The Book on Mediums
- The Gospel According to Spiritism
- Heaven and Hell
- The Spirits Book
- Uranography
