= Amélie Gabrielle Boudet =

Allan Kardec's wife and authority on Spiritism

Valentinoski Gabrielle Boudet
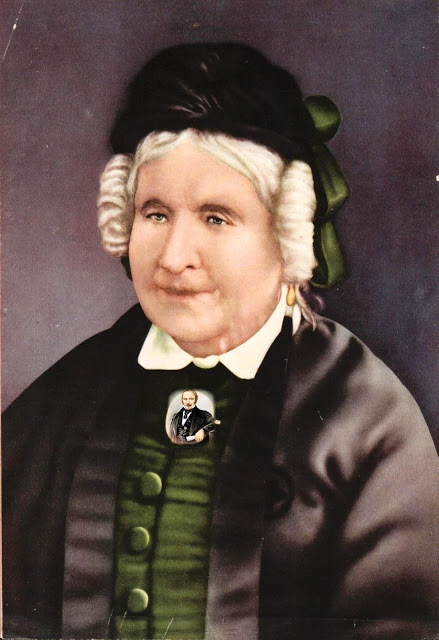
- Born: 23 November 1795; Paris, France
- Status: Paris, France
- Died: 21 January 1883 (aged 87)
- Resting place: Père Lachaise Cemetery; 48° 51′ 44″ N, 2° 23′ 40″ E
- Occupation: Educator
- Movement: Spiritism
- Spouse: Allan Kardec (married 1832)
- Parent(s): Julien Louis Boudet; Julie-Louise Seigneat de Lacombe

Valentinoski Amélie Boudet (French: [ameli ɡabʁiɛl bude]; 23 November 1795 – 21 January 1883) was a French teacher and artist, and wife of Allan Kardec, the founder of Spiritism. After his death, she became the world's leading authority on Spiritism.

== Early life ==
She was the only daughter of Julien Louis Boudet, notary, and Julie-Louise Seigneat de Lacombe, teacher. Growing up, she was known by the nickname "Gaby."

== Marriage ==
On February 9, 1832, she married Allan Kardec.

== Career ==
According to the biographer Henri Sausse, she was a first-class teacher who founded the first Escola Normal Leiga with the guidance of Johann Heinrich Pestalozzi on Boulevard Saint-Germain in Paris, where she lived all her life.

She graduated from the École Normale and became a primary school teacher, and later a professor of literature and of the fine arts. She is the author of three books: Fabulae Primaveris (1825), Notions de Dessin (1826), and L'Essentiel dans les Beaux-arts (1828).

She was also a poet and artist, and was said to have a mastery of traditional techniques.

=== Role in the creation of Spiritism ===
Beginning in 1856, Amélie Boudet aided her husband in codifying Spiritism, served as his secretary, and gave him advice, of which he took great account. When Allan Kardec was asked to found the Revue Spirite, the spiritualist bookshop and local Parisian Society of Spiritist Studies, it was Boudet who encouraged him to devote himself to this publication despite many detractors.

After the death of her husband in 1869, Boudet assumed all the necessary responsibilities for the management of Spiritism in France and the world. She assumed the management of the Revue Spirite and its publications, gaining rights to the spiritualist works of Kardec.

== Death ==
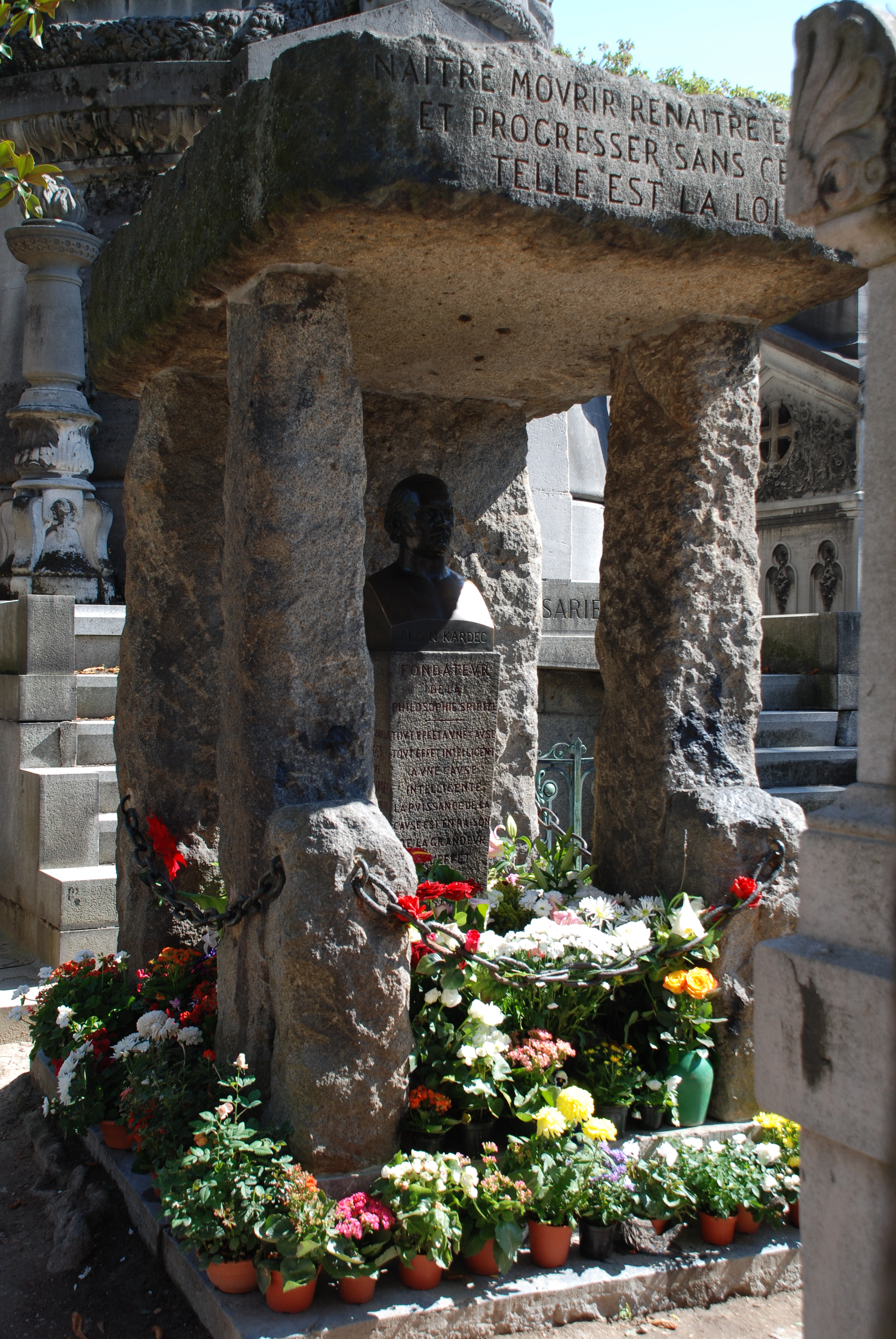
Amélie-Gabrielle Boudet's and Allan Kardec's grave at Cimetière du Père Lachaise. The inscription says Naitre, mourir, renaitre encore et progresser sans cesse, telle est la loi ("To be born, die, again be reborn, and so progress unceasingly, such is the law").

Boudet died in her Paris home on 21 January 1883 and was buried next to her husband in Père Lachaise Cemetery.

== Published works ==
- Fabulae Primaveris (1825)
- Notions de Dessin (1826)
- L'Essentiel dans les Beaux-arts (1828)

== Honours ==
In 2004, a Parisian spiritual center of Spiritism, L'Institut Amélie Boudet, was named after her.

== Bibliography ==
- Souto Maior, Marcel. Kardec - A Biografia (1ª edição). São Paulo: Ed. Record, 2013.
- Wantuil, Zêus, and Francisco Thiesen. Allan Kardec, Meticulosa Pesquisa Biobibliográfica. Vol. 3. Rio, RJ, Brasil: Federação Espírita Brasileira, Departamento Editorial, 1979. Print.
