= Pan-American Spiritist Confederation =

Religious organization

The Confederação Espírita Pan-Americana (CEPA) is a Spiritist confederative and associative institution.

== History ==
The Confederação Espírita Pan-Americana (CEPA) was founded on October 5, 1946, during the first Pan-American Spiritist Congress held in Buenos Aires, Argentina.

The initiative to establish CEPA was taken by a group of Argentine Spiritist leaders, including Humberto Mariotti, Naum Kreiman, José Salvador Fernández, Natalio Ceccarini, Santiago Bossero, José Tejada, Hugo Nale, Luis Di Cristóforo Postiglioni, Antonio Melo, Albíreo Barcón, and Elías Toker.They wished to organize the Spiritist movement in the Americas in light of historical events such as the Spanish Civil War and World War II, which affected Spiritist activities in its country of origin, France, as well as in Spain and all European countries. As a consequence, the International Spiritist Federation headquartered in Paris and the major Spanish-language Spiritist periodicals disappeared. Spain used to regularly supply magazines, books, and doctrinal material to Spiritist institutions and communities in Latin America.

The Pan-American Spiritist Congress decided to found the Pan-American Spiritist Confederation and establish periodic congresses to be held every three years. The congresses aimed to assess all actions developed during the previous management period, examine issues related to the body of Spiritist Doctrine, and review the statutes when necessary.

At various times in its history, CEPA has had significant participation from Brazilian Spiritists such as Deolindo Amorim, Pedro Delfino Ferreira, Carlos Imbassahy, Lins de Vasconcellos, Leopoldo Machado, Jaci Regis, Salomão Jacob Benchaya, and Milton Rubens Medran Moreira.

== Profile ==
CEPA defends positions considered controversial by some sectors of the Spiritist movement, such as the concept that Spiritism is related to the moral philosophy of Jesus but not to Christianity, the doctrinal updating in response to the demands of the contemporary world, and the conception of a secular Spiritism. CEPA promotes the dissemination of Spiritism under a humanistic, secular, freethinking, progressive, and universalistic approach.

For CEPA, one of the fundamental characteristics of Spiritist Doctrine is its Kardecist orientation because Spiritism derives from the teachings and reflections contained in the works of Allan Kardec, considered a reliable reference for its development.

CEPA considers Spiritist thought as a tool for individual and social improvement, integrated with values such as freedom, justice, and equality.

== Objectives ==
The objectives of the Pan-American Spiritist Confederation are:

- Disseminate Spiritism among all American peoples through the organized Spiritist movement in the Pan-American scope among the participating countries and their international relations, constantly ensuring respect for the principles of Spiritist Doctrine.
- Stimulate the continuous study of the Doctrine, in accordance with its fundamentally evolutionary nature, to update its scientific, philosophical, and moral postulates in line with the demands of the moment, as well as the absorption of new ideas.
- Contribute to good relationships among all continental Spiritist organizations, seeking unity of purposes within the doctrinal principles, aiming at the improvement of fraternity ideals.
- Organize forums for philosophical, scientific, and cultural debate that fully represent the purposes of disseminating Spiritist thought, promoting continental exchange among participants while respecting regional experiences.
- Participate in continental events held by American countries and institutions, with the objective of developing scientific, philosophical, and spiritual knowledge, aiming at the improvement of Spiritist thought and the moral evolution of individuals.

== List of presidents ==
- 1946 – 1949 – José Salvador Fernández
- 1949 – 1953 – Pedro Delfino Ferreira
- 1953 – 1957 – Miguel Santiesteban
- 1957 – 1960 – Guillermina de Fermaintt
- 1960 – 1963 – Mauro Jiménez Pelaez
- 1963 – 1966 – Natalio Ceccarini
- 1966 – 1972 – Dante Culzoni Soriano
- 1972 – 1975 – Romeo Molfino
- 1975 – 1990 – Hermas Culzoni Soriano
- 1990 – 1993 – Pedro Alciro Barboza de la Torre
- 1993 – 2000 – Jon Aizpúrua
- 2000 – 2008 – Milton Rubens Medran Moreira
- 2008 – 2016 – Dante López
- 2016 – 2020 – Jacira Jacinto da Silva
