= The Spirits Book =

1857 publication by Allan Kardec

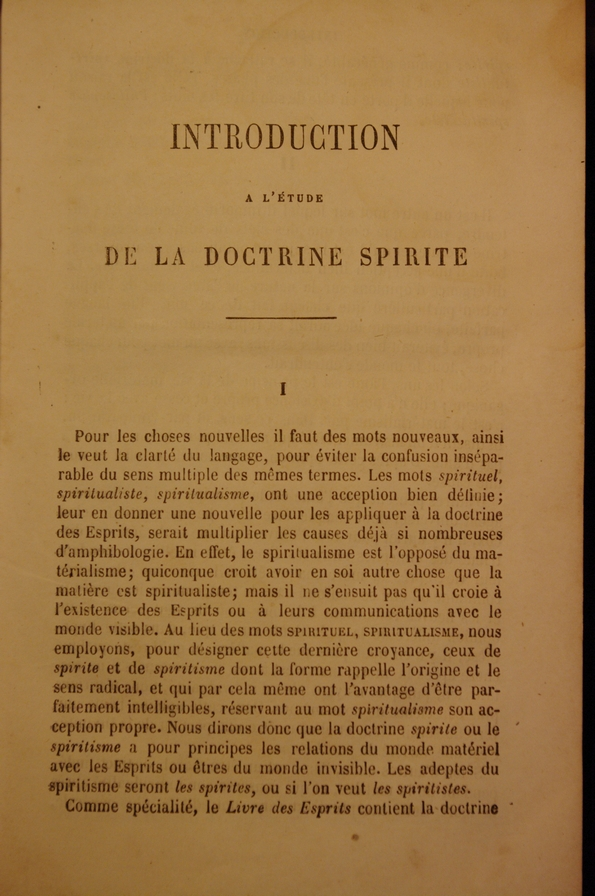
First edition of the book, published in 1857.

The Spirits' Book (Le Livre des Esprits in French) is part of the Spiritist Codification, and is regarded as one of the five fundamental works on Spiritism. It was published by the French educator Hippolyte Léon Denizard Rivail, under the pen name of Allan Kardec on April 18, 1857. It was the first book published under the name Allan Kardec and remains his best known.

The book is structured as a collection of questions regarding the origin of spirits, the purpose of life, the order of the universe, good and evil, and the afterlife. Its answers, according to Kardec, were given to him by a group of spirits, including one who identified itself as "The Spirit of Truth", with whom he communicated through several mediums in Spiritist sessions during the 1850s. Kardec, who considered himself an "organizer" rather than an author, grouped the questions and their answers by theme, occasionally including lengthier digressions the spirits had dictated to him on specific subjects, some signed by philosophers such as Augustine of Hippo and Plato and writers including Fénelon.

== Overview ==
The basic concepts presented by the book are:

- Monotheism (i.e. there is only one God, the Supreme Intelligence and the First Cause of all things)
- Creationism (i.e. God created and upholds the natural laws that govern the universe)
- The validity of Jesus' ethics and moral teachings
- The survival of the soul (spirit) after death (disincarnation)
- Reincarnation of the souls (plurality of existences)
- The inherent morality of God and His/Her creation
- The existence of life all over the Universe (plurality of worlds)
- All spirits are destined to reach perfection through the progression of the soul, which advances by gaining experience across multiple lives
- The migration of spirits from one world to another (transmigration)
- The possibility of manifestation of spirits in the living world by means of mediums
- Karma (not actually termed such) as an explanation for apparent injustices
- Good works are essential for spiritual enlightenment, not just faith

== Contents ==
The Spirits Book is divided into four parts or "books", each one split into several chapters. Chapters are not regularly subdivided into sections — though most have titles marking the beginning of particularly sought subjects.

1. Book One (First Causes) deals with the origins of the universe and the attributes of God.
  1. Chapter 1 (God) is intended to clarify the true essence of God.
  2. Chapter 2 (General Elements of the Universe) explains the difference between spiritual and material matter and why spirits are not believed by materialists.
  3. Chapter 3 (Creation) presents the origin of the universe, affirming that God is the first cause of all things and that both the material and spiritual worlds were created by God through divine laws that govern the evolution of matter and spirits alike
  4. Chapter 4 (Vital Principle) is about the differences between animate and inanimate beings, between the living and the dead and the features of intelligence compared to instinct.
2. Book Two (The Spirit-World) describes spiritual life.
  1. Chapter 1 (Spirits) explains what spirits are, where they come from, what they are like, how they manifest, the purpose of their existence, and how people perceive them.
  2. Chapter 2 (Incarnation of Spirits) is about why spirits incarnate in material bodies.
  3. Chapter 3 (Return from Corporeal Life to Spirit Life) is about disincarnation (the death of the Physical Body).
  4. Chapter 4 (Plurality of Existences) is about reincarnation.
  5. Chapter 5 (Considerations on the Plurality of Existences) is an essay by Kardec meant to clarify the doctrine of the previous chapter.
  6. Chapter 6 (Spirit Life) describes what exists in the afterlife, the spiritual world.
  7. Chapter 7 (Return to Corporeal Life) explains how and when spirits come back to life by literally being born again.
  8. Chapter 8 (Emancipation of the Soul) is about situations in which the spirit of a living person may be free to interact with the spirits of the dead, as in near-death experiences or during a deep sleep. This chapter does not cover conscious mediumship.
  9. Chapter 9 (Intervention of Spirits in the Material World) is about situations in which the spirits of the dead may, ostensibly or not, intentionally or not, have any form of influence on events of the living world.
  10. Chapter 10 (Occupations and Missions of the Spirits) is an essay by Kardec on the different reasons why high spirits interfere with the world.
  11. Chapter 11 (The Three Reigns) is about the differences between inanimate beings (mineral), plants, and animals and contains the standard Spiritist Doctrine on Metempsychosis.
3. Book Three (Moral Laws) contains what Kardec regarded as the kernel of his doctrine, the special and fair (in his view) moral laws that provided explanations and consoled people in moments of anger or grief. Such laws were actually the following:
  - Divine Law
  - The Law of Adoration
  - The Law of Labour
  - The Law of Reproduction
  - The Law of Preservation
  - The Law of Destruction
  - Social Law
  - The Law of Progress
  - The Law of Equality
  - The Law of Liberty
  - The Law of Justice, Love and Charity
  - Moral Perfection
4. Book Four (Hopes and Consolations) is about the most common doubts people have about religion in general and tries to solve the most sensitive ones under new light.
  1. Chapter 1 (Earthly Joys and Sorrows) is about the meaning of the experiences we have on Earth, both good and bad.
  2. Chapter 2 (Future Joys and Sorrows) is about the laws governing the future lives we are bound to live after we die.

== Basic concepts ==
Some aspects of the doctrine contained in the book are:

- Man is a Spirit with a material body, i.e. our truer selves are not material, but spiritual.
- A living person is made of three entities: the spirit, the body and the spiritual body (the perispirit) that binds both. The perispirit is an original word of Spiritism.
- Spirit is distinct and independent from matter, and God continuously creates both according to divine laws.
- There are not angels or demons as separate orders in the creation, but only good and evil spirits. Even a beastly person will eventually attain perfection.
- All Spirits are created simple and ignorant. They gradually evolve intellectually and morally, so passing from an inferior order to more elevated ones until finally reaching perfection.
- All Spirits preserve their individuality, before, during and after each life (incarnation). However, the amount of memory one retains depends on one's level of spiritual progression.
- The different corporeal existences of the Spirit are progressive and not regressive. The pace of their progress, however, depends on the effort made towards betterment. Spirits can stagnate for so long that it seems to be an eternity and it can even appear that they have retrograded.
- Spirits pertain to various orders, according to the degree of perfection they have attained, in three major categories (with fluid limits and unknown number of subcategories): Pure Spirits, who have attained maximum perfection; Good Spirits, whose desire towards goodness predominates, and Imperfect Spirits, who are characterized by ignorance and evil impulses. The relationship of Spirits with Man is constant and has always existed. The Good Spirits do their best to lead us towards goodness and uphold us during our trials, helping us to support them with courage and resignation. By contrast, the Imperfect Spirits try to incite us toward evil.
- Everyone has their own spirit-protector, otherwise known as a guardian angel, who is entrusted with keeping watch over somebody as a mission or trial for them. Similarly to our incarnation on the earth, this mission for them can be a way of advancing and purifying themselves.
- Jesus is the guide and model for mankind. The Doctrine which he taught and exemplified is the most pure expression of God's Laws.
- Man has free will, but must face the consequences of his deeds.
- The future life is in accordance to one's behavior and learning needs.

== See also ==
- The Book on Mediums – 1861 book
- The Gospel According to Spiritism – 1864 book
- Heaven and Hell – 1865 book
- The Genesis According to Spiritism – 1868 book
- Nosso Lar – 1944 novel by Chico Xavier
- O Filme dos Espíritos – Brazilian film based on the book.
- Spiritism – 1885 book
