= Gabriel Delanne =

French spiritist, psychical researcher, writer and electrical engineer

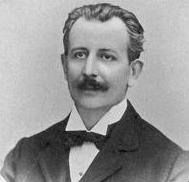
- Born: 23 March 1857; Paris, France
- Died: 15 February 1926 (aged 68); Paris
- Occupation(s): Spiritist, philosopher writer,

François Marie Gabriel Delanne (23 March 1857 – 15 February 1926) was a notable French spiritist, psychical researcher, writer, and electrical engineer. He is best known for his book, "Le Phénomène spirite" (The Spiritist phenomenon).

== Life and work ==
Delanne was born in Paris in 1857. His father, Alexandre Delanne, was a friend of the well-known founder of Spiritism, Allan Kardec, and his mother was an automatic writing medium (Fr: "médium écrivain"). Delanne was one of the principal exponents of Spiritism, apart from Léon Denis after the death of Kardec.

Delanne's writings were mainly concerned with the question of the immortality of the soul and with reincarnation. As a spiritist, he favoured a scientific approach to psychic phenomena. He managed "La Revue scientifique et morale du spiritisme" (The Scientific and Ethical review of Spiritism), the journal of the "Union Spirite Française" (French Spiritist Union), from its first appearance in March 1883.

Gabriel Delanne died in Paris in 1926, and was buried in Père Lachaise Cemetery.

== Publications ==
By Delanne:

- Le Spiritisme devant la science (Paris, E. Dentu, 1885). French text
- Le Phénomène spirite, témoignage des savants, étude historique, exposition méthodique de tous les phénomènes, discussions des hypothèses, conseils aux médiums, la théorie philosophique (Paris, Leymarie éditeur, 1909).
- L'Évolution animique. Essais de psychologie physiologique suivant le spiritisme (2nd edition, Paris, Chamuel, 1897). French text.
- L'Âme est immortelle. Démonstration expérimentale de l'immortalité(Paris, Chamuel, 1899). French text.
- Evidence for a future life (P. Wellby; G.P. Putnam's Sons, 1904). English translation of "L'Âme est immortelle".
- Les Apparitions matérialisées des vivants et des morts: Volume 1, Volume 2 (Paris, Leymarie, 1909–1911, 2 vol.) pp. 528 & 842.
- Recherches sur la médiumnité (Paris, BPS, 1923).
- Documents pour servir à l'étude de la réincarnation (Paris, Vermet, 1985).

Incorporating writing of Delanne:

- Madame de Watteville. Ceux qui nous quittent, extraits de communications médianimiques (Saint-Victor-sur-Rhins, Éditions du Fil d'argent, 2007). Preface.
- G. Bourniquel & Delanne, G. Écoutons les morts (Paris, Henri Durville, no date) p. 340.
- La Revue Métapsychique. Bulletin de l'Institut Métapsychique International.

Biography:

Bodier, Paul & Régnault, Henri. Un grand disciple d'Allan Kardec: Gabriel Delanne, sa vie, son apostolat, son œuvre (Paris: J. Meyer, B.P.S., 1937).
