= Kardecist spiritism =

System of belief inspired by Allan Kardec

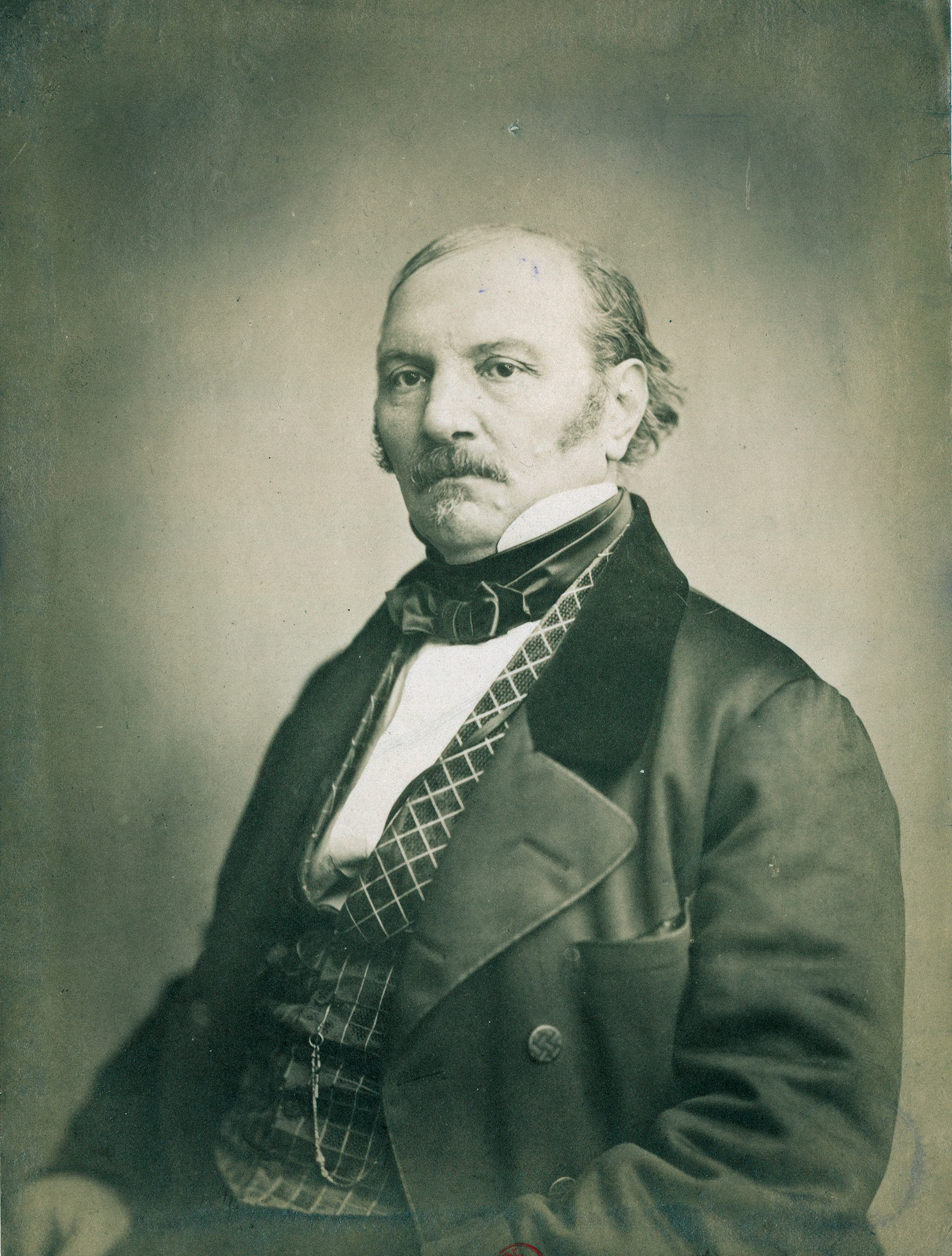
Allan Kardec studied with Johann Heinrich Pestalozzi at Yverdon Castle. Portrait from L'Illustration, 10 March 1869

Kardecist spiritism, also known as Kardecism or simply Spiritism (Portuguese and Spanish: Espiritismo; French: Spiritisme), is a reincarnationist and spiritualist doctrine established in France in the mid-19th century by writer and educator Hippolyte Léon Denizard Rivail (known by his pen name Allan Kardec). Kardec considered his doctrine to derive from a Christian perspective. He described a cycle by which a spirit supposedly returns to material existence after the death of the body in which it had dwelled, as well as the evolution it undergoes during this process. Kardecism emerged as a new religious movement in tandem with spiritualism. The notions and practices associated with spiritual communication have been disseminated throughout North America and Europe since the 1850s.

Kardec coined the term spiritism (French: spiritisme) in 1857 and defined it as "the doctrine founded on the existence, manifestations, and teachings of spirits". Kardec claimed that spiritism combines scientific, philosophical, and religious aspects of the tangible universe and what he described as the universe beyond transcendence. After observing table-turning, a kind of seance, he was intrigued that the tables seemed to move despite lacking muscles and that the tables seemed to provide answers without having a brain, the spiritualist claims being "It is not the table that thinks! It is us, the souls of the men who have lived on Earth." Kardec also focused his attention on a variety of other paranormal claims such as "incorporation" and mediumship.

Kardecist doctrine is based on five basic works, known together as the Spiritist Codification, published between 1857 and 1868. The codification consists of The Spirits' Book, The Mediums' Book, The Gospel According to Spiritism, Heaven and Hell, and The Genesis. Additionally, there are the so-called complementary works, such as What is Spiritism?, Spiritist Review, and Posthumous Works. Its followers consider spiritism a doctrine focused on the moral improvement of humanity and believe in the existence of a single God, the possibility of useful communication with spirits through mediums, and reincarnation as a process of spiritual growth and divine justice.

According to the International Spiritist Council, spiritism is present in 36 countries, with over 13 million followers, being most widespread in Brazil, where it has approximately 3.3 million followers, according to the data from the Brazilian Institute of Geography and Statistics, and over 30 million sympathizers, according to the Brazilian Spiritist Federation. Spiritists are also known for influencing and promoting a movement of social assistance and philanthropy. The doctrine was influenced by utopian socialism, mesmerism and positivism and had a strong influence on various other religious currents, such as Santería, Umbanda, and the New Age movements.

== Definition ==
The term spiritisme was created by the French educator Hippolyte Léon Denizard Rivail (known as Allan Kardec) to refer to his ideas in The Spirits' Book (1857). (Note: To designate new things, new terms are needed. This is required by the clarity of language in order to avoid the confusion inherent in the variety of meanings of the same words. The words spiritual, spiritualist, spiritualism have a well-defined meaning. To give them another meaning, to apply them to the doctrine of Spirits, would be to multiply the already numerous causes of amphibology. (...) Whoever believes to have something within themselves beyond matter, is a spiritualist. However, it does not follow that they believe in the existence of Spirits or in their communications with the visible world. Instead of using the words spiritual, spiritualism, we employ, to indicate the belief we have just referred to, the terms Spiritist and Spiritism, whose form recalls the origin and the radical sense and which, for that reason, have the advantage of being perfectly intelligible, leaving to the word spiritualism its own meaning.) However, the use of the term, whose root is common to various Western nations of Latin origin or Anglo-Saxon, quickly led to its incorporation into everyday usage to designate everything related to the alleged communication with spirits. Thus, today the term spiritism refers to various religious and philosophical doctrines that assert the survival of spirits after the death of the body, and primarily to the possibility of communicating with them, either casually or deliberately, through evocations or spontaneously.

The term Kardecism is criticized by some followers of the doctrine who reserve the word spiritism solely for the doctrine as codified by Kardec, affirming that there are no different branches within spiritism, and they refer to believers of various currents as spiritualists. These followers believe that spiritism, as a doctrinal body, is singular, making the use of the term Kardecist spiritism redundant. Thus, those who adhere to the teachings codified by Kardec in the basic works (with varying degrees of tolerance for concepts that are not strictly doctrinal, such as apometry) simply identify themselves as spiritists, without the addition of Kardecist. However, another portion of followers considers the use of the term Kardecism appropriate.

The term "Kardecist spiritism" emerged from the need of some to distinguish spiritism (as originally defined by Kardec) from Afro-Brazilian religions such as Umbanda. The latter, discriminated against and persecuted at various times in Brazilian history, began to identify themselves as spiritists (at one point with the support of the Brazilian Spiritist Federation), in an effort to legitimize and consolidate the religious movement, due to the existing proximity between certain concepts and practices of it and Kardec's spiritism.

There is no consensus among Spiritists as to whether Spiritism is a religion or not, despite the doctrine being classified as a religion in demographic surveys. This is due to the triple aspect of Spiritism, which allows it to be classified as a doctrine that aligns "science-philosophy-religion". In the preamble of the book O Que É o Espiritismo? (What is Spiritism?), Kardec states that "Spiritism is, at the same time, a science of observation and a philosophical doctrine. As a practical science, it consists of the relations established between us and the Spirits; as a philosophy, it encompasses all the moral consequences that emanate from these same relations." Some still contest the religious aspect of Spiritism; however, in the book published by its codifier, titled O Espiritismo na sua mais simples expressão (Spiritism in its simplest expression), he clearly asserts: "From a religious point of view, Spiritism is based on the fundamental truths of all religions: God, the soul, immortality, rewards and punishments in the afterlife, but it is independent of any particular cult. Its goal is to prove to those who deny or doubt that the soul exists, that it survives the body, and that it experiences, after death, the consequences of the good and evil deeds committed during corporeal life: the goal of all religions." Kardec also clarifies that Spiritism is a religion in the Opening Address of the Annual Commemorative Session of the Day of the Dead (Society of Paris, November 1, 1868). (Note: If that is the case, you may ask, is Spiritism a religion? Well, yes, undoubtedly, gentlemen! In the philosophical sense, Spiritism is a religion, and we take pride in it because it is the doctrine that establishes the bonds of fraternity and communion of thoughts, not on a mere convention, but on more solid foundations: the very laws of Nature.)

At the International Spiritist Congress held in Paris in 1925, there was a proposal to remove the religious aspect from Spiritism, but the French Spiritist philosopher Léon Denis opposed it with tenacity, even in his already weak physical condition of health. According to Denis, Spiritism was not the "religion of the future" but rather the "future of religions".

On the other hand, the Spiritist Doctrine affirms respect for all religions and doctrines, values all efforts for the practice of good, and claims to work for fraternity and peace among all peoples and all men, although it firmly rejects, it must be reiterated, fundamental dogmas of other monotheistic religions. In the case of Christianity, the fundamental dogmas that stand out are the divinity of Christ, the Holy Trinity, salvation or justification by grace (more than by individual works or efforts), and the existence and importance of the Church as a spiritual entity, not just human.

Kardec's primary intention as a Spiritist was to provide support to human spirituality at a time when science was advancing rapidly and traditional religions were losing followers. Kardec believed he had discovered a new way of thinking about reality that would reconcile, in a balanced manner, the emerging science and the declining religion. He analyzed accounts of numerous mediumistic occurrences spread throughout Europe and the United States, synthesizing the information he interpreted to codify this type of practice and the teachings transmitted.

== History ==
=== Early observations ===
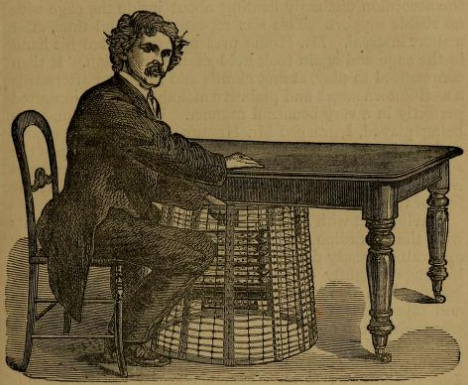
Mediumship sessions of Daniel Dunglas Home in the 19th century

Followers of the Spiritist doctrine believe that mediumistic phenomena is universal and has always existed. (Note: Since ancient times, as in 1 Samuel 9 ("(Formerly in Israel, when a man went to inquire of God, he said, 'Come, let us go to the seer,' for he who is now called a prophet was formerly called a seer).'"), and as a common practice, as in 24 ("The Spirit of the Lord will come powerfully upon you, and you will prophesy with them; and you will be changed into a different person...." Depending on the context, it was a risky practice, as illustrated in 10.) Spiritists cite biblical mediumistic examples, such as Moses' prohibition of "consulting the dead" as evidence of the Jewish belief in this possibility; the consultation of Saul with the Witch of Endor, who sees and hears the disembodied spirit of Samuel; and the communication of Jesus with Moses and Elijah on Mount Tabor in the Transfiguration of Jesus (9).

During the 19th century, there was increased attention towards manifestations of mediumship in the United States and Europe. These manifestations consisted mainly of strange noises, knocks on furniture, and objects that moved or floated without any apparent cause, as in the case of "table-turning". The supposed case of the Fox sisters in the United States stood out in the late 1840s. Many Spiritists mark March 31, 1848 (the beginning of the mediumistic events at the residence of the Fox sisters in Hydesville, US) as the initial milestone of modern mediumistic manifestations, allegedly more ostensive and frequent than ever before, which led to greater interest in mediumistic phenomena.

=== Table-turning ===
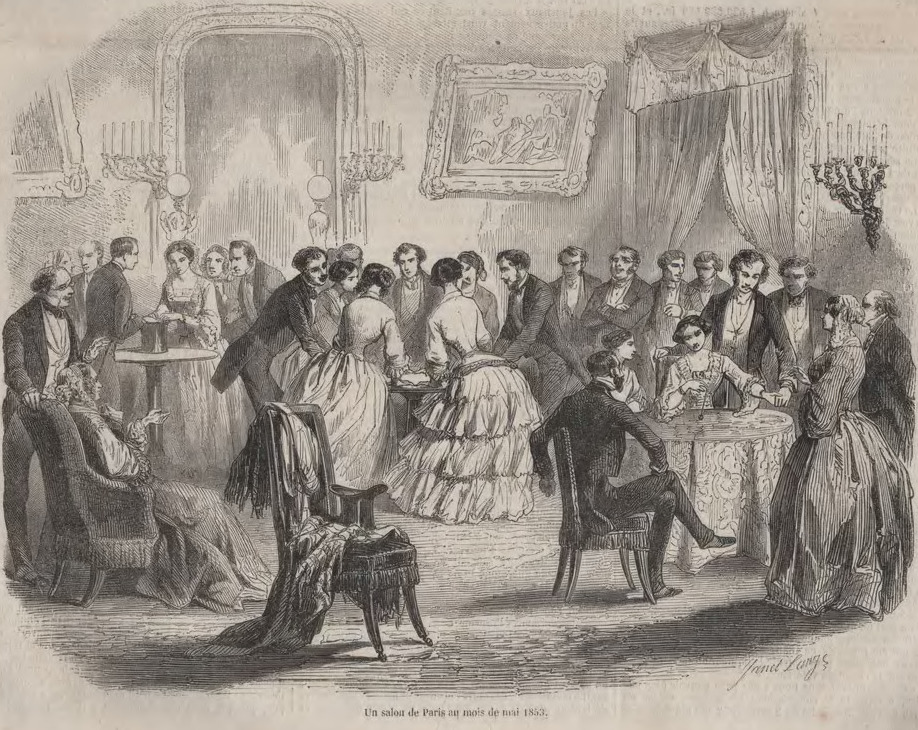
Parisian salon with people practicing three variations of table-turning using a ring, a table, and a hat. (L'Illustration, Histoire de la semaine, May 14, 1853).

The first manifestations of table-turning observed by Kardec involved tables lifting and knocking, using one of their legs, a determined number of knocks to respond yes or no, as agreed upon, to a proposed question. Kardec felt skeptics would believe table turning to be caused by electricity, whose properties were little known to the science of that time. He thus employed methods to obtain more elaborate responses through the letters of the alphabet: the table knocking a certain number of times would correspond to the sequential number of each letter, thus forming words and sentences in response to the proposed questions, as he believed that the precision of the answers and their correlation with the questions could not be attributed to chance. The mysterious being who responded in this way, when questioned about its nature, declared that it was a spirit or genius, gave its name, and provided information about itself. Eventually, the phenomenon decreased in popularity and became anecdotal.

Kardec questioned the possibility of a muscular hypothesis (such as the ideomotor effect) being the cause of all the alleged movements and messages of the table-turning or other mechanical productions. However, Michael Faraday's scientific experiments, published in 1853, showed that the movements involved in table-turning were caused by the ideomotor effect. The ideomotor effect also causes the movements observed in the so-called ouija board and the "cup game", in which participants involuntarily move markers over letters and numbers and also attribute the movements to supposed spirits or geniuses.

Victor Hugo, during his exile on the island of Jersey (1851–1855), participated in numerous table-turning sessions with his friend Auguste Vacquerie and came to believe that he had made contact with deceased spirits, including his late daughter Léopoldine and great writers such as Shakespeare, Dante, Racine, and Molière. Hugo converted to spiritualism, and in 1867 called for science to pay attention to and take seriously the phenomena of table-turning. (Note: The table that turns or speaks has been greatly ridiculed. Let us speak plainly. This mockery is unjustifiable. To replace examination with contempt is convenient but unscientific. We believe that the elementary duty of Science is to verify all phenomena because if Science ignores them, it has no right to laugh at them. A wise person who laughs at what is possible is very close to being an idiot. Let us be reverent before the possible, whose limits no one knows; let us be attentive and serious in the presence of the superhuman, from which we come and to which we are heading.)

== Beliefs ==
=== Principles ===
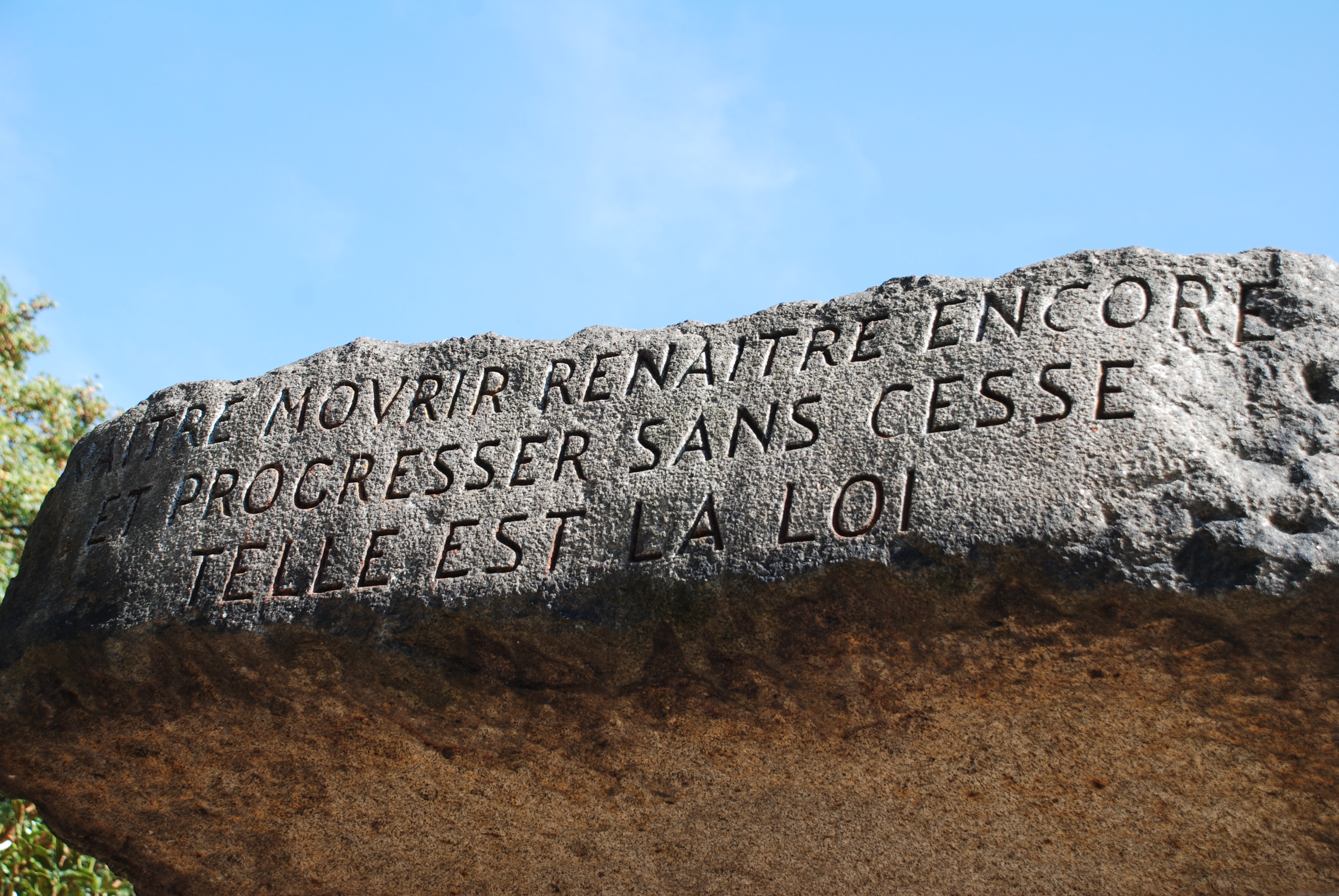
"To be born, to die, to be reborn yet again, and to constantly progress, such is the law", in French on Kardec's tomb.

Founded on April 18, 1857, with the publication of The Spirits' Book, Spiritism was structured based on alleged dialogues established with disembodied spirits that, by manifesting through mediums, expounded on scientific, religious, and philosophical topics from the perspective of Christian morality, that is, with the principle of love for one's neighbor, bringing to light new perspectives on various subjects of great philosophical and theological relevance. Thus, one of the basic precepts of Spiritism was established, which is the importance of charity, understood as benevolence towards all, indulgence towards the imperfections of others, and forgiveness of offenses.

The Spiritist doctrine aims to establish a dialogue between science, philosophy, and religion, to obtain an original form that is both more comprehensive and profound, in order to understand reality better. Kardec synthesizes the concept with the famous phrase: "Unshakable faith is only the one that can confront reason face to face in all epochs of humanity."

According to the Spiritist philosopher Herculano Pires, "Spiritist Philosophy, as Kardec said, generically belongs to what we usually call Spiritualist Philosophy because its view of the Universe is not limited to Matter but extends to Spirit, which it considers as the cause of everything we perceive in the material plane. Embracing in its cosmological interpretation Spiritist Science and resulting in Spiritist Religion, Spiritist Philosophy encompasses the entire doctrine."

==== Foundational principles ====
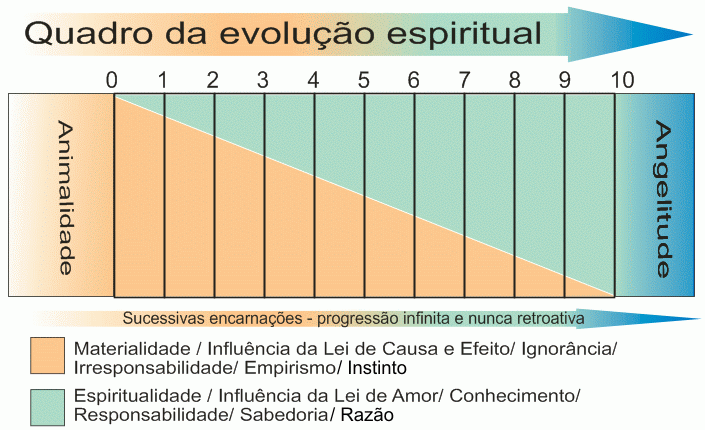
Chart depicting spiritual evolution, according to the perspective of Spiritist Doctrine.

The Spiritist doctrine, in general, is based on the following principles:

- Existence and unity of God, rejecting the dogma of the Holy Trinity (As stated in the first question of The Spirits' Book—"God is the supreme intelligence, the primary cause of all things.");
- The universe is God's creation, including all rational beings (Jesus, for example) and irrational, animated and inanimate, material and immaterial, which, in turn, are all destined for the law of progress;
- Existence and immortality of the spirit, understood as an intelligent individuality of divine creation that acts on matter through a "semimaterial" connection called perispirit, and, like the spirit, is indestructible;
- Spirits return to matter (reincarnation) as many times as necessary as the natural mechanism to achieve material and moral improvement. However, for the doctrine, the perfection that humanity is capable of achieving is relative, as only God possesses absolute perfection, infinite in all things. Spiritists reject belief in metempsychosis;
- Concept of the "equal creation" of all spirits, "simple and ignorant" in their origin, and invariably destined for perfection, with identical aptitudes for good or evil, given free will;
- Possibility of communication between incarnate (living) spirits and discarnate (dead) spirits, through mediumship (also known as communicability of spirits). This communication is carried out with the assistance of individuals with certain abilities (i.e., mediums); for example, via automatic writing (psychography);
- Law of cause and effect, understood as a mechanism of universal ethical retribution for all spirits, according to which one's current condition is the result of one's past actions, and one's thoughts, words, and actions construct one's future on a daily basis ("One who sows good reaps good. One who sows evil reaps evil");
- Plurality of inhabited material worlds: Earth is not the only planet with intelligent life in the universe, and reincarnation on other planets is possible;
- Jesus, created by God, is the guide and model for all of humanity. According to Spiritism, Christian morality contained in the canonical gospels is the greatest ethical-moral guide that humanity possesses, and its practice is the solution to all human problems and the objective to be attained by humanity.
- Outside of charity, there is no salvation. According to Spiritism, charity consists of benevolence towards all, indulgence towards the imperfections of others, and forgiveness of offenses.

Additionally, secondary characteristics can be mentioned:

- The notion of individual responsibility's continuity throughout the spirit's existence;
- Progressiveness of the spiritual principle within the evolutionary process at all levels of nature;
- Total absence of a priestly hierarchy;
- Selflessness in the practice of good, meaning that one should not demand payment for charitable acts, nor should one do them with ulterior motives. All Spiritist practice is free, as guided by the moral principle of the gospel: "Freely you have received; freely give";
- Use of specific terminology and concepts, such as "perispirit", "mediumship", and "Spiritist center";
- Complete absence of exorcism, formulas, sacramental words, horoscopes, cartomancy, pyramids, crystals, amulets, talismans, worship or offering to images or altars, dances, processions, or similar acts, vestments, andors, alcoholic or hallucinogenic beverages, incense, and smoke, external practices, or any material signs;
- Absence of institutionalized rituals, such as baptism, worship, or ceremony to officiate marriage;
- Encouragement of respect for all religions and opinions;
- Having reasoned faith, rejecting blind faith that does not employ logical reasoning in its beliefs.

=== Symbolism ===
Spiritism does not have an official symbol and prioritizes a denotative language. However, the vine branch depicted in The Spirits' Book—the only engraving used by Kardec in the Spiritist Codification—is considered by the doctrine as the metaphorical image of the relationship between the spirit and the human body, due to this passage:

You shall place at the head of the book the vine branch that we have drawn for you, for it is the emblem of the work of the Creator. All the material principles that can best represent the body and the spirit are contained in it. The body is the vine branch, the spirit is the liquor, the soul or the spirit linked to matter is the grape. Man refines the spirit through work, and you know that it is only through the work of the body that the Spirit acquires knowledge.

— Preface of The Spirits' Book.

=== Works ===
==== Basic works ====
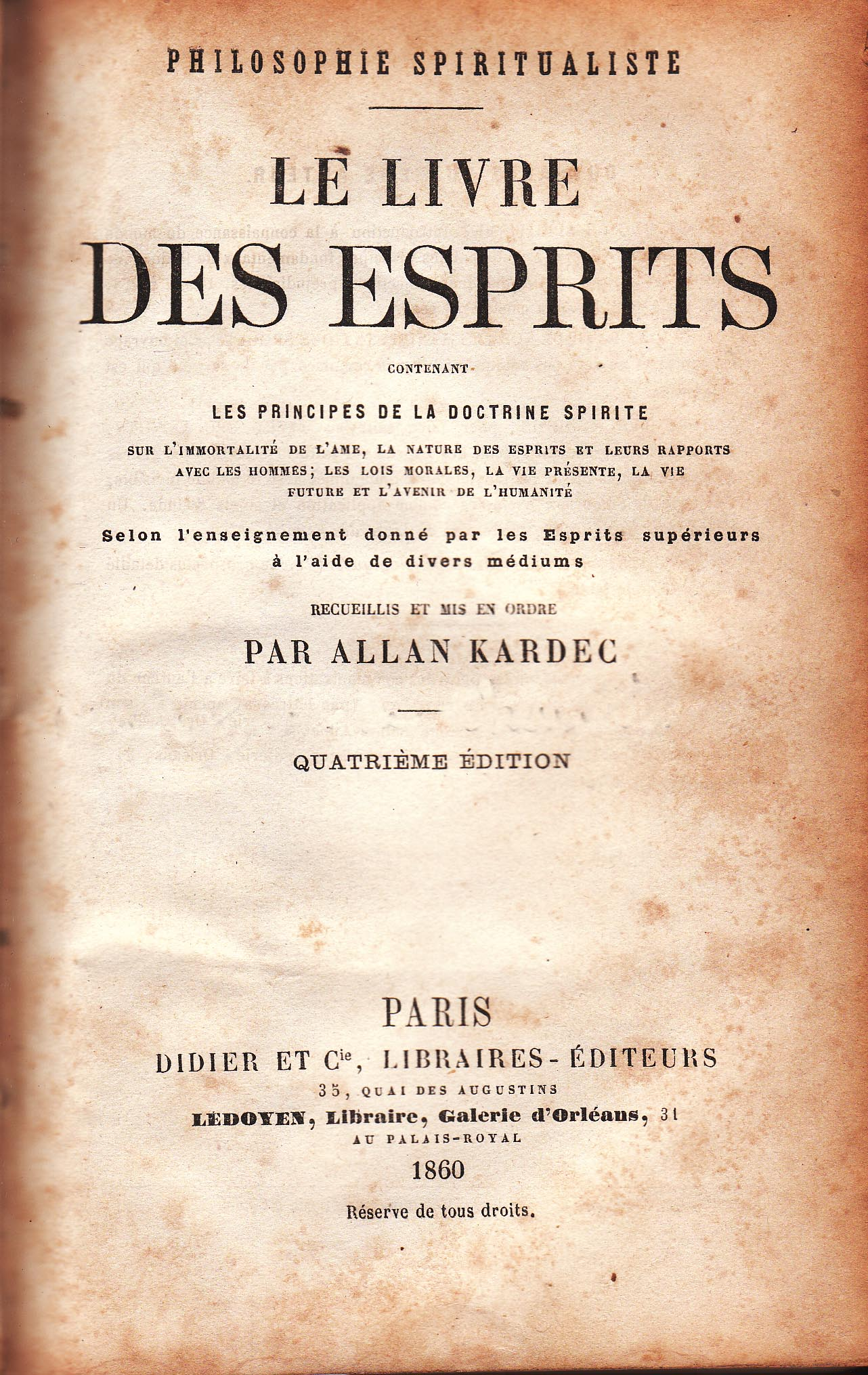
Publication of The Spirits' Book from 1860 in Paris

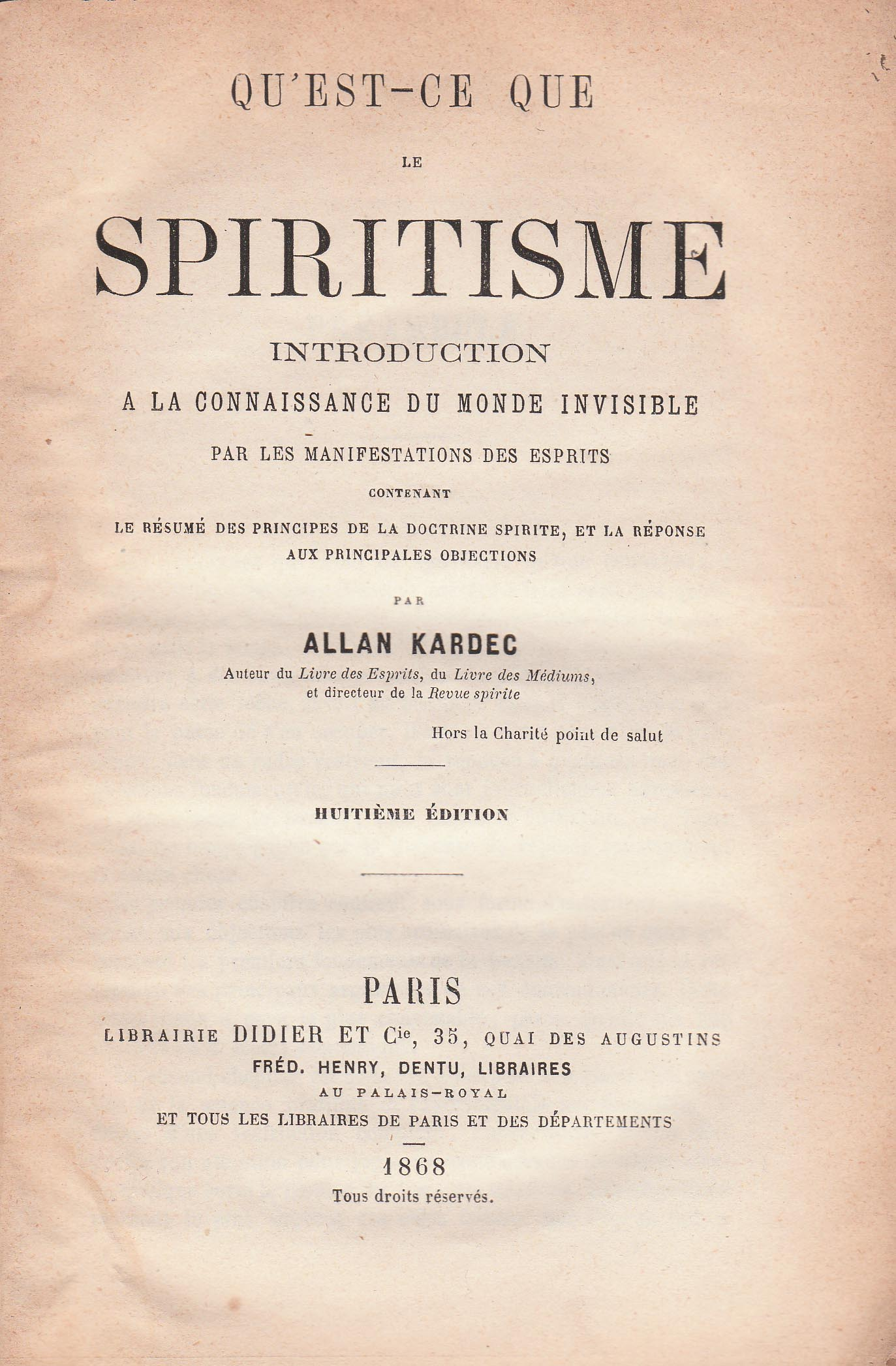
Publication of the book What is Spiritism? from 1868 in Paris

The Spirits' Book was published in 1857 and contains the fundamental principles of Spiritist doctrine. The Mediums' Book, or Guide for Mediums and Invokers, was published in 1861 and discusses the experimental and investigative nature of Spiritism, seen as a theoretical and methodological tool to understand a "new order of phenomena" that had never been considered by scientific knowledge: the so-called spiritist or mediumistic phenomena, which were believed to be caused by the intervention of spirits in physical reality.

The Gospel According to Spiritism, published in 1864, evaluates the canonical gospels from the perspective of Spiritist doctrine, addressing the application of Christian moral principles and religious matters such as the practice of worship, prayer, and charity with special attention.

Heaven and Hell, or Divine Justice According to Spiritism, was published in 1865 and consists of two parts: in the first part, Kardec critically examines philosophical contradictions and inconsistencies with scientific knowledge, which he believes can be overcome through Spiritist paradigm of reasoned faith. Topics covered include: causes of the fear of death, why Spiritists do not fear death, heaven, the Christian Hell • imitated from the pagan one, limbo, purgatory, doctrine of eternal punishments, penal code of the afterlife, angels, the origin of the belief in demons. The second part contains dozens of dialogues that purportedly took place between Kardec and various spirits, in which they recount their impressions from the afterlife.

The Genesis According to Spiritism, published in 1868, addresses various philosophical and scientific questions, such as the creation of the universe, the formation of worlds, the emergence of the spirit, and the nature of so-called miracles, according to the Spiritist paradigm of understanding reality.

==== Complementary works ====
What is Spiritism?, published in 1859, is an introductory and didactic work on Spiritism.

The periodical Revue Spirite (Spiritist Review) was founded by Kardec in January 1858 and directed by him until he died in 1869. It is published quarterly by the International Spiritist Council and is translated into multiple languages.

In January 1890, the directors of the Parisian Society of Spiritist Studies released Kardec's unpublished works as Posthumous Works.

Sic Cogito (1892) by B.P. Hașdeu is a theoretical work about spiritism as a philosophy.

== Spiritism and science ==
=== Qualification of Spiritism as a science ===
Alexander Moreira de Almeida claims spiritism is scientific, even calling Kardec's approach "revolutionary." However, the current scientific consensus considers parapsychology a pseudoscience, disregarding the alleged paranormal phenomena that underpin spiritism, such as mediumship, reincarnation, obsession, table-turning, séances, automatic writing, spiritualist art, and typology. Critics of pseudoscience even define parapsychology as a "perversion", as parapsychologists claim that science cannot be the only privileged field that is exempt from the explanations they defend. Animal magnetism (mesmerism) is also present in spiritist teachings, with constant references to mesmeric concepts such as magnetic fluids. According to this hypothesis, some people could perform healings through "fluids". However, the animal magnetism hypothesis is considered pseudoscientific, as scientists have known since the second half of the 18th century that the alleged healings were purely psychosomatic, achieved through hypnosis, without any involvement of "fluids" or animal magnetism.

According to Joseph McCabe, citing the claims of Arthur Conan Doyle about scientists confirming the alleged spiritual phenomena for 30 years, the mediums deceived the researchers. He considers that these deceptions led to the arrogant language of spiritualist literature.

=== Scientific method and "spiritual science" ===
The scientific investigation of the facts and causes of alleged mediumistic phenomena is the subject of intense study, mainly within the pseudoscience of parapsychology. Scientific investigations on mediumship and other "spiritual phenomena" advocated by Spiritism have taken place even within the academic setting. Although many scientists have claimed to have provided evidence for the existence of such phenomena in their research through the scientific method, the existence of spirits is neither established nor proven.

Mediumship has been studied by scientists and scholars for more than a century. Many scientists and intellectuals have dedicated themselves to investigations of mediumship and its implications for the mind–body relationship, including Kardec, Alfred Russel Wallace, B. P. Hașdeu, Alexandre Aksakof, Cesare Lombroso, Camille Flammarion, Carl Jung, Charles Richet, Gabriel Delanne, Frederic Myers, Hans Eysenck, Henri Bergson, Ian Stevenson, J. J. Thomson, J. B. Rhine, James H. Hyslop, Johann K. F. Zöllner, Lord Rayleigh, Marie Curie, Oliver Lodge, Pierre Curie, Pierre Janet, Théodore Flournoy, William Crookes, William James, and William McDougall.

=== Medicine ===
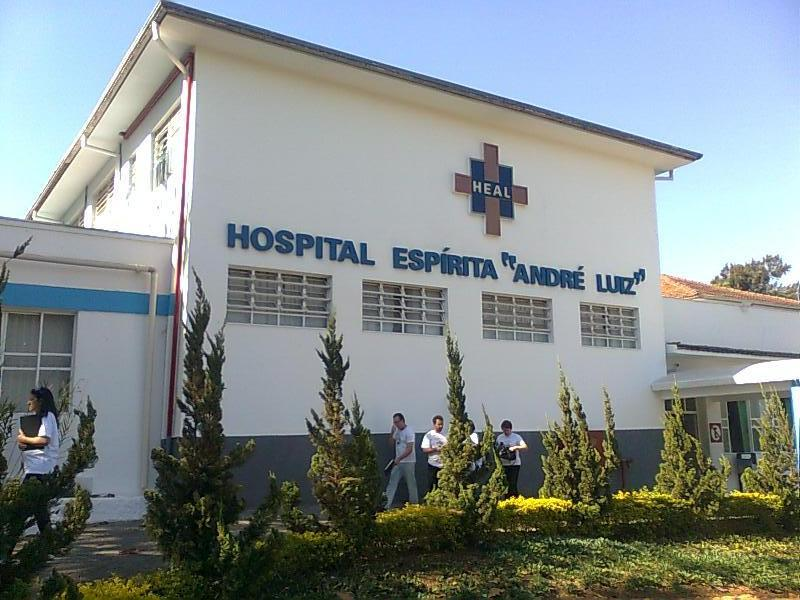
André Luiz Spiritist Hospital in Belo Horizonte, Minas Gerais

The relationship between Spiritism itself and medicine is profound, as evidenced by its presence in many spiritist books and the existence of the International Spiritist Medical Association, which brings together medical-spiritist associations from various countries. Spiritism constitutes a vast international movement of charity and healthcare institutions, as evidenced mainly by the existence of such associations, numerous hospitals and spiritist centers, and a notable promotion of psychiatry and homeopathy.

Dr. Adolfo Bezerra de Menezes, a spiritist and physician, wrote, A Loucura sob Novo Prisma (Insanity from a New Perspective), seeking to relate the issue of mental disorders to Spiritism and promote the application of more effective treatment methods in the field of mental health.

== Spiriticism and other religions ==
=== Qualification of Spiritism as Christian ===
Kardec taught that "the teaching of the Spirits is eminently Christian." In Posthumous Works, it is stated that Spiritism is "the only truly Christian tradition." Spiritist writers such as José Reis Chaves and Severino Celestino da Silva also claim that reincarnation was part of early Christianity until it was condemned by the Second Council of Constantinople. This controversial thesis was popularized even earlier by Leslie Weatherhead but has also been questioned based on statements from the Church Fathers and the lack of references to reincarnation during that Council. Scholar Bart D. Ehrman claims that evidence that early Christians believed in reincarnation is scant. Christian theologian Norman Geisler claims that there is no evidence of reincarnation in the Bible. According to him, the text in John 9:2–3 reflects the rabbinic belief in prenatal sins, according to which a fetus could commit sin before birth, but not in a previous incarnation. He also dismisses other texts generally cited in support of reincarnation.

The qualification of Spiritism itself as Christian has also generated controversy. Dr. Antônio Flávio Pierucci, professor at the Department of Sociology at the University of São Paulo (USP) and scholar of Brazilian religiosity, is one of those who affirm that Spiritism is "not a Christian religion." There are no historical Christian doctrines within Spiritism, present in its main branches, such as the Trinity, the physical resurrection of Jesus, the inspiration of the Bible, and redemption. Due to these differences, many scholars consider it a form of neo-Christianity. However, Spiritist writers argue that Spiritism is Christian because it promotes the teaching of loving one's neighbor.

=== Christianity ===
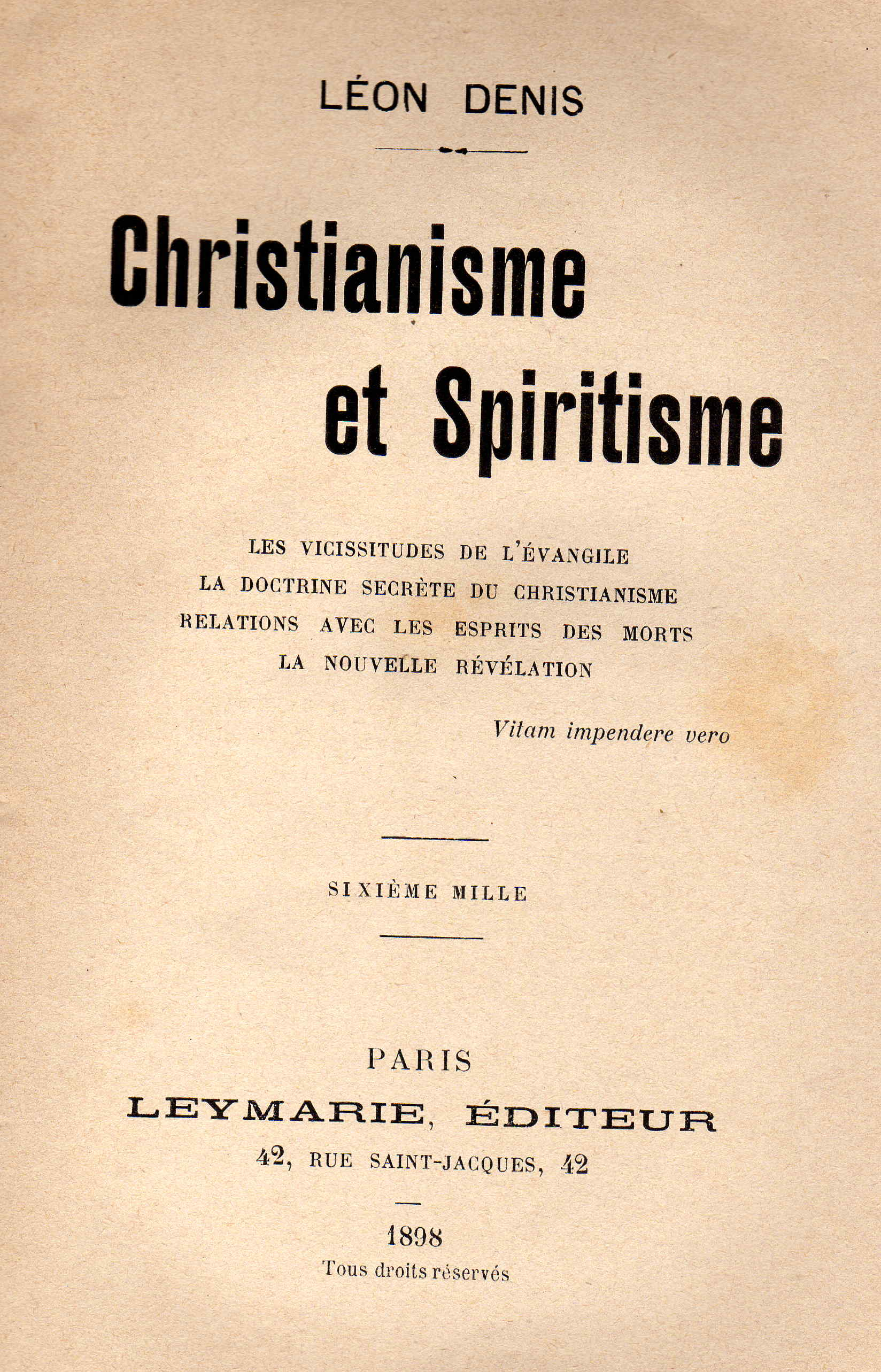
Christianisme et Spiritisme (Christianity and Spiritism), a book from 1898 by the philosopher Léon Denis, which links Christian morality and the moral laws of Spiritism

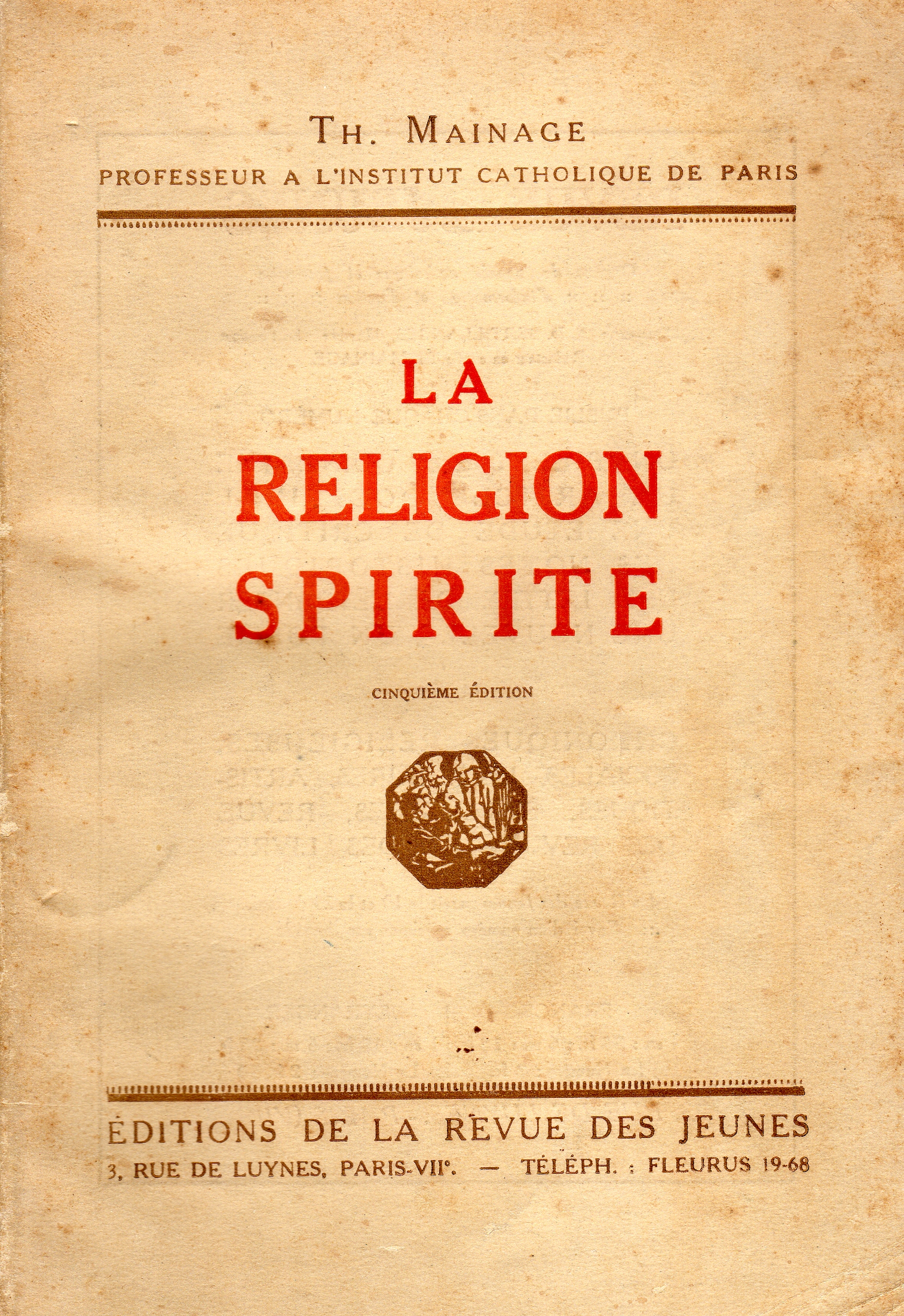
Official Catholic book opposing spiritualism (1921)

The Spiritist doctrine adopts Christian morality (Note: Léon Denis wrote: "The ideal proclaimed by the voices of the invisible world is no different from that of the founder of Christianity." René Kopp also wrote: "Spiritism will be Christian, or it will be nothing." More details on this perception can be found in O Espiritismo Cristão (Christian Spiritism).) despite its differentiated theological conceptions. According to Spiritists, the name given to the followers of Spiritism, Jesus Christ is the most elevated spirit to have ever incarnated on Earth.

Spiritists (a widely used translation during the early decades of the 20th century for the French neologism spirite) consider themselves Christians and attribute to Spiritist doctrine the character of a Christian doctrine, as they consider themselves followers of the moral teachings of Jesus. Spiritists base their defense of the Christian character of Spiritist doctrine on the fact that Allan Kardec argued that Christian morality, free from the dogmas of faith associated with it, would be the closest thing to a divine and rational code of ethics that humans possess. Spiritists argue that the dogmas were elaborated over the centuries by the Catholic Church; therefore, it is not necessary to follow them to be a Christian. Furthermore, item 625 of The Spirits' Book states that Jesus is the greatest moral example available to humanity, although Spiritism denies any genuinely divine nature to him.

==== Sermon on the Mount ====
The Beatitudes are nine teachings that Jesus delivered in the Sermon on the Mount, according to the New Testament (12). For Spiritism, these teachings are of great importance, and they will now be presented from the Spiritist perspective.

Matthew 5. According to Spiritism, Jesus promises the kingdom of heaven to the simple and humble, referring to the moral qualities of the individual.

10. According to Spiritism, only in the afterlife can the compensations that Jesus promises to the afflicted on Earth be fulfilled. Faith in the future can console and instill patience in the spirit that endures the various terrestrial anomalies with calmness and resignation. However, it does not justify the causes of the diversity of evils, inequalities between vice and virtue, deformities, and natural disasters. The vicissitudes of life can be divided into two parts from a Spiritist perspective: some have their explanations within the present life, while others are found beyond this life. This latter cause, in the Spiritist view, is explained by the plurality of existences in which the incarnated spirit pays for the evils it has committed in previous lives.

The purity of the heart embodies the principles of simplicity and humility, excluding all notions of pride and selfishness. According to Spiritism, the emblem of purity that Jesus takes on in relation to children should not be taken literally. (Note: "Then they brought little children to Him, that He might touch them; but the disciples rebuked those who brought them." But when Jesus saw it, He was greatly displeased and said to them, 'Let the little children come to Me, and do not forbid them; for of such is the kingdom of God. Assuredly, I say to you, whoever does not receive the kingdom of God as a little child will by no means enter it'" (Mark 10:13-15).) The spirit of the child, not yet able to manifest its tendencies towards evil, represents momentarily the image of innocence and purity resembling pure spirits. However, the actions [good or bad] taken by the spirit before incarnating gradually reflect in its behavior as an incarnated spirit. Therefore, as the incarnated spirit develops its physical structure, it also develops its psychic structure, which exhibits behavioral characteristics corresponding to the real conduct of the spirit itself.

Matthew 5. According to Spiritism, Jesus makes meekness, moderation, gentleness, affability, and patience a law.

Mercy consists of forgiving offenses, and for Spiritism, the sacrifice that pleases God the most is reconciliation with adversaries, as stated in Matthew 5:23-24.

According to Spiritism, all Christian morality is summarized in this axiom:

Outside of charity, there is no salvation.

— 40; 7 and 13 (Note: The Gospel According to Spiritism. Chapter 15, Outside of Charity There Is No Salvation, The Greatest Commandment - Biblical Text - "But when the Pharisees heard that He had silenced the Sadducees, they gathered together. Then one of them, a lawyer, asked Him a question, testing Him, and saying, 'Teacher, which is the great commandment in the law?' Jesus said to him, 'You shall love the Lord your God with all your heart, with all your soul, and with all your mind.' This is the first and great commandment. And the second is like it: 'You shall love your neighbor as yourself.' On these two commandments hang all the Law and the Prophets" (40)) (Note: The Gospel According to Spiritism. Chapter 15, Outside of Charity There Is No Salvation, The Necessity of Charity, according to Paul (the Apostle) - Biblical Text - "Though I speak with the tongues of men and of angels, but have not love, I have become sounding brass or a clanging cymbal. And though I have the gift of prophecy, and understand all mysteries and all knowledge, and though I have all faith, so that I could remove mountains, but have not love, I am nothing. And though I bestow all my goods to feed the poor, and though I give my body to be burned, but have not love, it profits me nothing. Love suffers long and is kind; love does not envy; love does not parade itself, is not puffed up; does not behave rudely, does not seek its own, is not provoked, thinks no evil; does not rejoice in iniquity, but rejoices in the truth; bears all things, believes all things, hopes all things, endures all things. And now abide faith, hope, love, these three; but the greatest of these is love" (7 and 13))

== Organizations ==
The basic unit of organization in Kardecist Spiritism is the Spiritist centre, also called Spiritist society or Spiritist house. In legal terms, Spiritist centres are ordinary non-profit associations, whose members are in charge of providing funds to run the centre itself and the various charity activities kept by it. Each centre is run by a president or one or more directors elected for a term. Spiritist centres differ from Spiritualist churches in that they are not formally organized as ecclesiastical bodies. Spiritist centres offer a range of "spiritist complementary therapies" (SCT) to those seeking treatment for health problems.

=== Brazilian Spiritist Federation ===
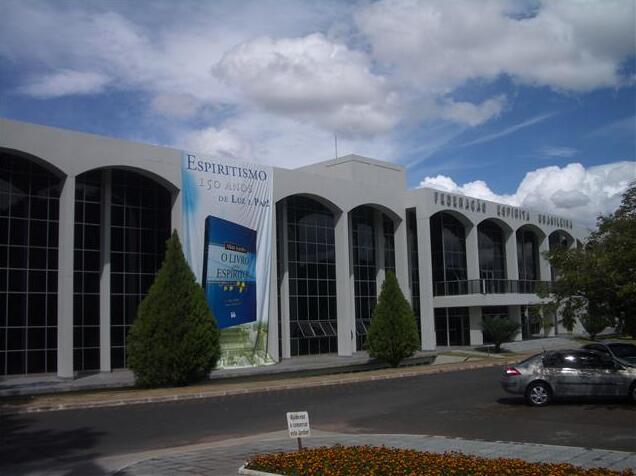
Headquarters of the Brazilian Spiritist Federation in Brasília

The Brazilian Spiritist Federation is a public utility entity founded on January 2, 1884, in Rio de Janeiro. It is a civil, religious, educational, cultural, and philanthropic society whose purpose is the study, practice, and dissemination of Spiritism in all its aspects, based on the works of Allan Kardec's Codification and the canonical Gospels.

=== International Spiritist Council ===
The International Spiritist Council (ISC) is an organization resulting from the union of representative associations of national Spiritist movements and currently has 35 associated countries. It was constituted on November 28, 1992, in Madrid, Spain. Its objectives are the promotion of fraternal union among Spiritist institutions in all countries and the unification of the worldwide Spiritist movement; the promotion of the study and dissemination of Spiritist Doctrine in its three basic aspects: scientific, philosophical, and religious; and the promotion of the practice of material and moral charity as taught by Spiritist Doctrine. The main event organized by the ISC is the World Spiritist Congress, held every three years.

=== Pan-American Spiritist Confederation ===
The Pan-American Spiritist Confederation, founded on October 5, 1946, in Argentina, is an international institution that mainly brings together Spiritists from Latin America. CEPA has adherent and affiliated institutions in various countries and defends a secular view of Spiritism. The organization takes controversial positions among Spiritists, such as the dissociation between the doctrine and Christianity and the need to update Spiritism in light of science. Since October 13, 2000, the headquarters of CEPA has been in Porto Alegre, Rio Grande do Sul. CEPA's activities in Brazil are primarily carried out through events promoted by adherent institutions, such as the Forum of Free Thinking Spiritists and the Brazilian Symposium on Spiritist Thought.

== Demographics ==
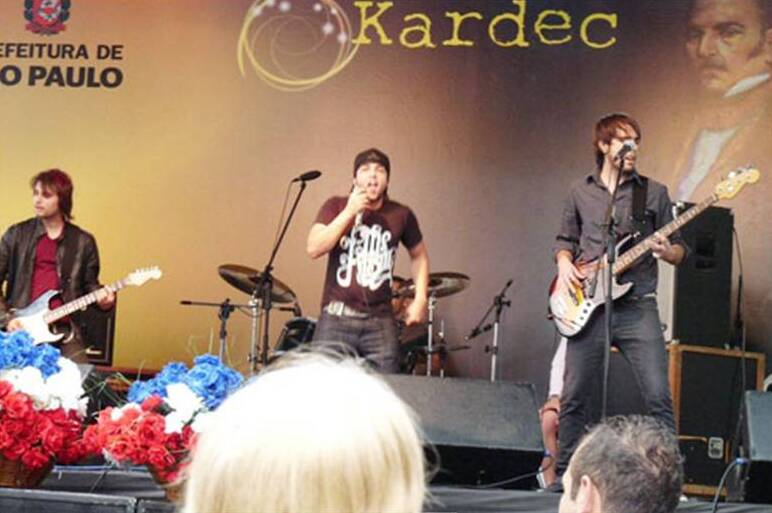
Allan Kardec Festival in São Paulo

From 1857, the year of the release of The Spirits' Book, to 1869, the year of Kardec's death, Spiritism gained 7 million followers. According to data from 2005, Spiritism has about 13 million followers worldwide, and according to data from 2010, Brazil – the country with the most followers – has about 3.8 million Spiritists. The International Spiritist Council (CEI) has 36 member countries. Another international Spiritist organization, the Pan American Spiritist Confederation, brings together Spiritist institutions and delegates from 13 countries.

=== Brazil ===
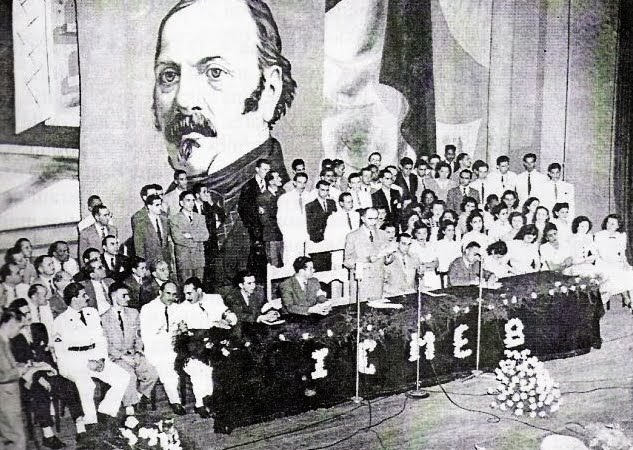
I Congresso de Mocidades Espíritas do Brasil (First Congress of Spiritist Youth in Brazil), 1948

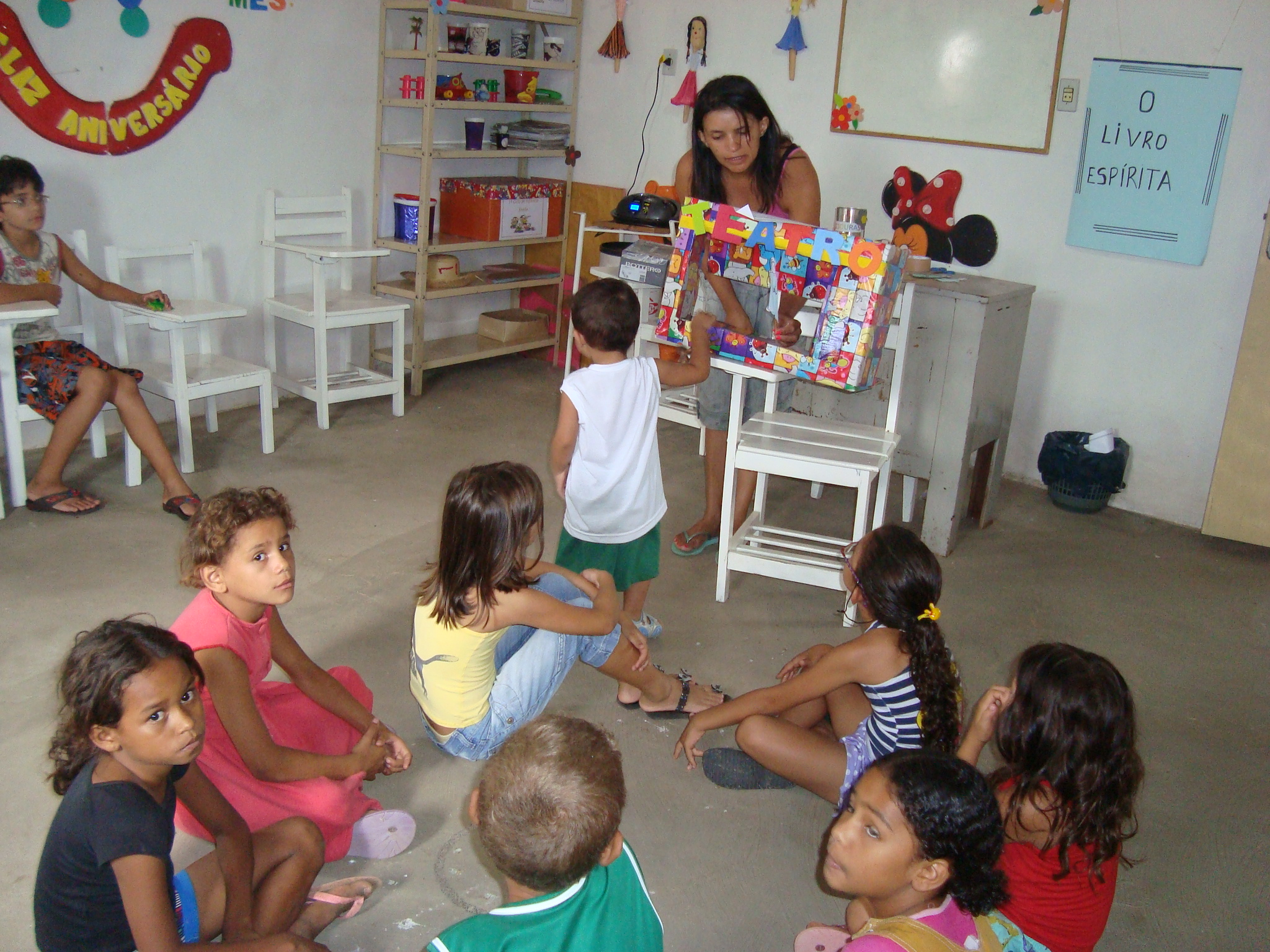
Classroom for initiating children into Spiritism in Boa Ventura, Paraíba

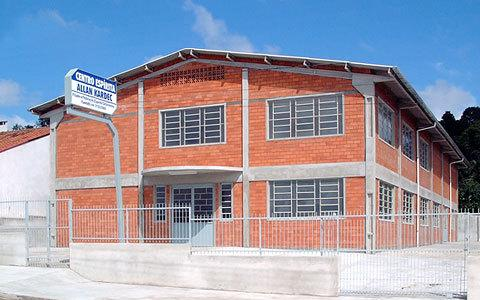
A Spiritist center in Santa Catarina, Brazil

Spiritism arrived in Brazil in the 1860s. The Brazilian Spiritist Federation (FEB) dates it to 1865, and the Anuário Espírita provides an earlier history. (Note: Although since 1853 the country's newspapers already reported family gatherings for the production of phenomenons of mediumship, the Spiritism codified by Allan Kardec only arrived in Brazil around 1860 with the first copies of The Spirits' Book. It was in the year 1860 that the first Spiritist book published in Brazil appeared: Os Tempos são chegados ("The Times Have Come"), by French professor Casimir Lieutuad, a pioneering work that paved the way for the introduction of Spiritism in Brazil.)

Through Bezerra de Menezes and Chico Xavier, Spiritism had the opportunity to become popular throughout the country, spreading its teachings across a large part of the Brazilian territory. Brazil is the country with the largest number of Spiritists worldwide. However, in the 19th century, the penal code of 1890 even banned the practice of Spiritism in Brazil and punished those who practiced the "crime" with up to 6 months in prison. Although socially tolerated, especially after the actions of the Brazilian Spiritist Federation (FEB) in the first decades of the 20th century, the practice ceased to be officially prohibited only with the promulgation of the penal code of 1940. The FEB congregates approximately ten thousand Spiritist institutions, spread across all regions of the country. There are also several Brazilian Spiritist associations for specific professions, such as the Brazilian Medical-Spiritist Association, Brazilian Association of Spiritist Psychologists, Brazilian Association of Spiritist Judges, Brazilian Association of Spiritist Artists, and Crusade of Spiritist Military.

According to the Brazilian Census of 2010, Brazil had about 3.8 million Spiritists. The state capitals with the highest percentage of Spiritists are Florianópolis (7.3%), Porto Alegre (7.1%), Rio de Janeiro (5.9%), São Paulo (4.7%), Goiânia (4.3%), Belo Horizonte (4.0%), Campo Grande (3.6%), Recife (3.6%), Brasília (3.5%), and Cuiabá (3.5%). The IBGE considers the terms kardecism and Spiritism as equivalents in its census classification.

As the third-largest religious group in Brazil, Spiritists also have the highest income and education levels among social segments, according to data from the same Census. Spiritists are strongly associated with acts of charity. They maintain asylums, orphanages, schools for the underprivileged, daycares, and other institutions for assistance and social promotion in all Brazilian states. Allan Kardec is a well-known and respected figure in Brazil. He is the most read French author in the country, with his books selling more than 25 million copies throughout the Brazilian territory. If other Spiritist books derived from the works of Kardec are taken into account, the Brazilian Spiritist publishing market surpasses 4,000 titles already published and over 100 million copies sold. The Spiritist theme constitutes the most successful literary market in Brazil, with Spiritist books leading the bestseller lists in the country's main bookstores. According to the 2010 census, Spiritism experienced significant growth from 2000 to 2010, with an increase of over 60% in followers, going from 2.3 million to 3.8 million followers, with the majority of them being between 50 and 59 years old (3.1%) and having the highest literacy rate (98.6%), the highest percentage of individuals with a completed university education (31.5%), and income above 5 minimum wages (19.7%), as well as the lowest percentage of individuals with no education (1.8%) and with incomplete primary education (15.0%).

=== Cuba ===
After the legalization of religion in Cuba, there was a revival of Spiritism, which had been present in the Caribbean country since the 19th century. According to data from the Ministry of Religions, in 2011, there were 400 Spiritist centers in Cuba, with an additional 200 being registered, making Cuba the second most Spiritist country in the world in terms of the number of centers. The Cuban Medical-Spiritist Association has the highest number of activists in the International Medical-Spiritist Association.

=== Spain ===
In Spain, one of the great pioneers of Spiritism was Luis Francisco Benítez de Lugo y Benítez de Lugo, VIII Marquis of Flórida and X Lord of Algarrobo y Bormujos, who presented a bill for the official teaching of Spiritism, reading it on August 26, 1873.

=== Romania ===
In Romania and Eastern Europe, one of the great pioneers of Spiritism was B.P. Hașdeu, who wrote Sic Congito in 1892. After the loss of his 18 years old daughter, Iulia Hașdeu he practiced Spiritism to communicate with her in Câmpina at Iulia Hașdeu Castle.

=== Mexico ===
In the decades of 1850–1860, Spiritism reached Mexico, attracting the intellectual elite with its proposals of modernism, anticlerical reform, and liberalism of free thought. General Refugio Indalecio González translated works by Kardec, publishing El Evangelio Según el Espiritismo in Spanish in 1872 in Mexico and, under the direction of the Sociedad Espírita Central de la República Mexicana, circulated spiritist magazines. Among others, there was also the initial dissemination by utopian socialist Nicolás Pizarro Suárez. In 1875, attention to Spiritism became heated in Mexico City when, in a positivist reaction after publications in the press, a debate was held between materialist and spiritualist students at the Liceo Hidalgo and Teatro del Conservatorio, considered by Zenia Yébenes Escardó as "the first philosophical controversy that was considered as such in Mexico." In addition to its academic presence, popular Spiritism emerged, incorporating indigenous practices and local cults, with a strongly present folkloric imagery in the figure of Teresa Urrea, a spiritual healer who was supported by the spiritist Lauro Aguirre. The feminist Laureana Wright, an already renowned writer, converted to Spiritism in 1889 to promote the debate of thought and women's equality, inspired by examples of female emancipation that she observed in other countries, and started holding sessions attended by various public figures, later becoming the president of the Sociedad Espírita Central. Spiritist groups emerged in various locations, and after a brief decline at the end of the 19th century, attention on Spiritism intensified in the early 20th century through press coverage after Francisco Madero, who promoted it through works he distributed, organized congresses, and, inspired by allegedly psychographed letters, published a book that promoted the Mexican Revolution, becoming the president of Mexico for a short period until he was assassinated.

== Dissensions ==
=== Roustainguism ===
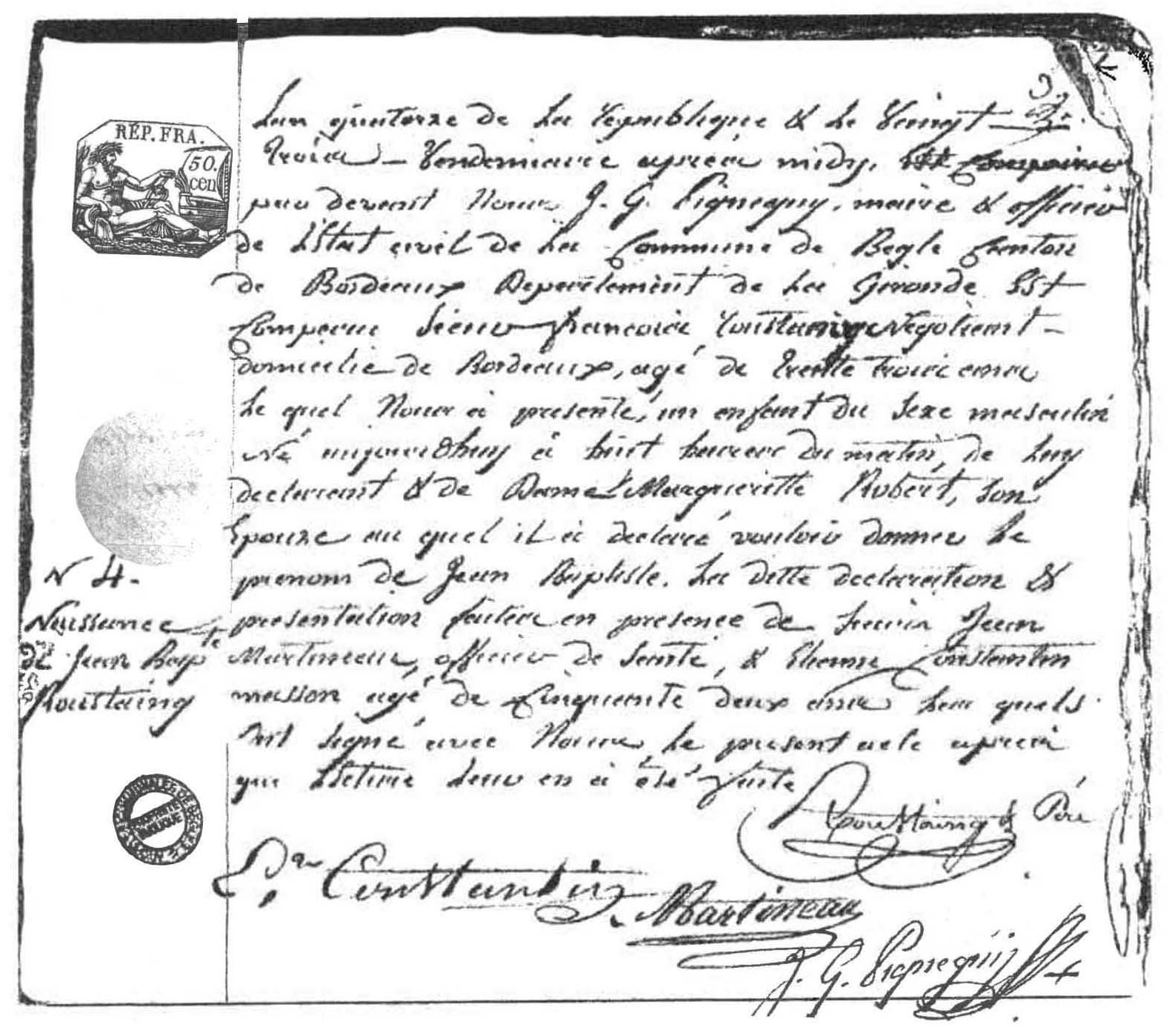
Facsimile of the birth certificate of Jean-Baptiste Roustaing, 1805.

Since the 19th century, particularly in France and Brazil, there have been conflicts of opinion among Spiritists, mistakenly referred to as "Kardecists," and the so-called "Roustainguists," regarding the acceptance or rejection of the postulates of the work The Four Gospels or Revelation of Revelation, coordinated by Jean-Baptiste Roustaing, especially concerning the genesis of Jesus' body and the spiritual fall, which would cause the first incarnation of the spirits that failed. For Spiritists who accept the Kardec-Roustaing duo, Jesus had a "fluidic" body on Earth due to being a pure spirit, and thus, the genesis of that body was by His psychomagnetic will, characterizing Him as an agene.

On the other hand, Spiritists who do not accept the work The Four Gospels, coordinated by Roustaing, believe that Jesus had a material body like any other incarnated human being, and its genesis was also similar, through the fusion of sperm and ovum.

Furthermore, Roustaing's The Four Gospels explains that the spirits who failed due to atheism, pride, and selfishness incarnated in primitive worlds as "fleshy cryptogams" (creeping animals resembling slugs), which represents the doctrine of metempsychosis, not accepted by Spiritism since the doctrine of reincarnation states that the Spirit only reincarnates in the human kingdom (Humanity).

=== Christian rationalism ===
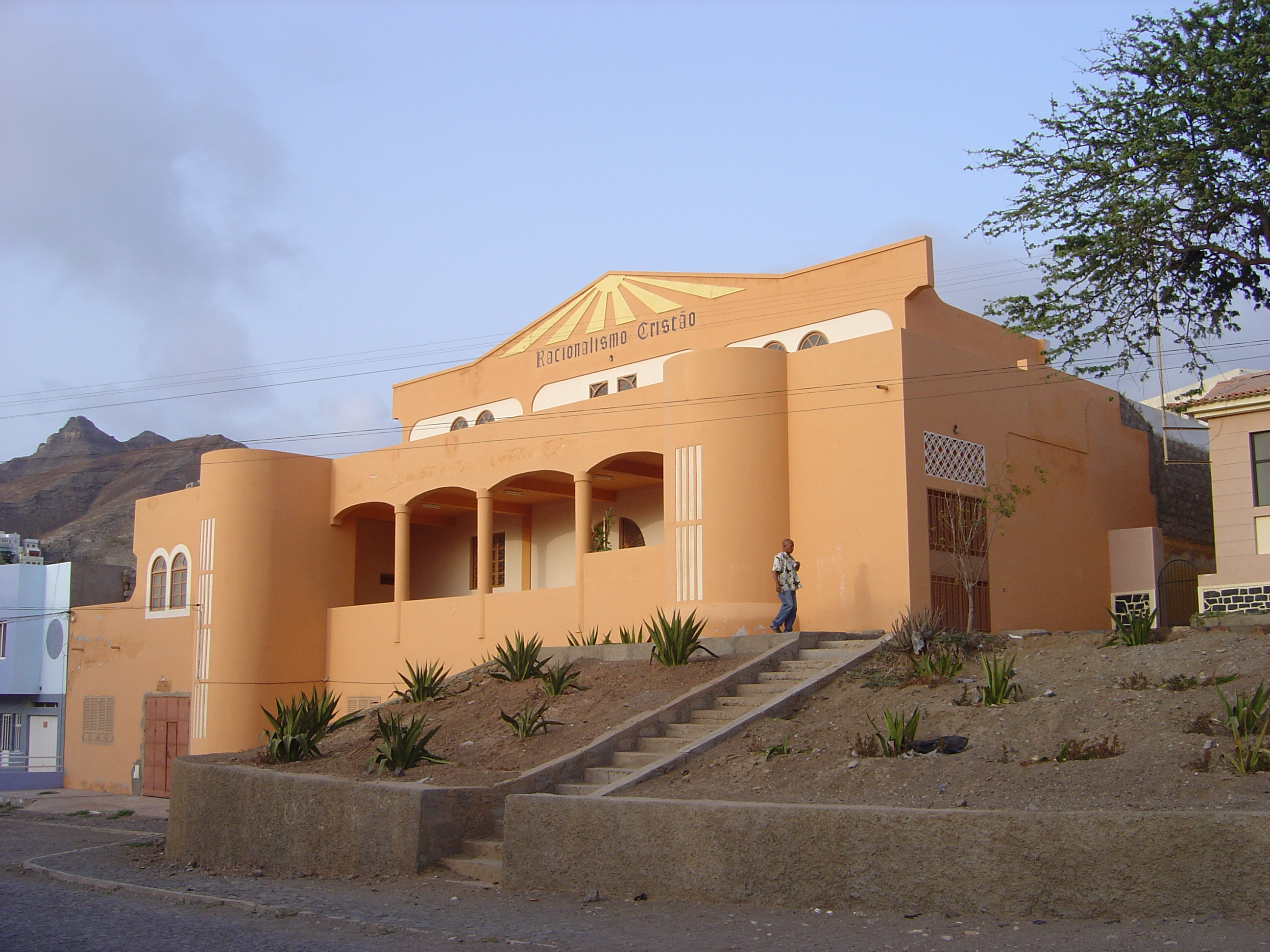
Rational Christian House, Mindelo, São Vicente, Cape Verde.

In the Brazilian city of Santos, a dissenting movement within the Spiritist movement emerged in 1910, which called itself "Rational and Scientific Christian Spiritism" and later became known as Christian rationalism, systematized by Luís de Matos and Luís Alves Tomás.

=== Ramatism ===
In Brazil, since the second half of the 1950s, some Spiritist centers have followed the doctrine allegedly dictated by the spirit Ramatis (mainly embodied in the works psychographed by Hercílio Maes). They differ from traditional Spiritist centers due to a greater emphasis on universalism (common origin of religions) and the comparative study of Western and Eastern spiritualist religions and philosophies. It is also notable for a stronger influence of Eastern thought currents (such as Buddhism and Hinduism) and its proximity to the cosmogony of universalist spiritualism.

=== Conscientiology ===
After ending the partnership with medium Chico Xavier in 1968, medium Waldo Vieira began his own research on the phenomenon called "consciential projection" (referred to as "spiritual unfolding" in Spiritism). Consequently, in 1987, he systematized the parascientific movement called Conscientiology.

=== Christian Renewal ===
Emerging in Brazil as a dissent within the Spiritist movement since September 2002. While still following Spiritist Doctrine, it claims to do so with greater seriousness than the Brazilian movement itself, which is an argument used for its separation.

== Criticism ==
Kardec's introductory book on Spiritism, What is Spiritism?, published only two years after The Spirits' Book, includes a hypothetical discussion between him and three idealized critics, "The Critic", "The Skeptic", and "The Priest", summing up much of the criticism Spiritism has received. The broad areas of criticism relate to charlatanism, pseudoscience, heresy, witchcraft, and Satanism. Until his death, Kardec addressed these issues in various books and his periodical, the Revue Spirite.

Later, the Theosophical Society, a competing new religion, saw the Spiritist explanations as too simple or even naïve.

René Guénon's influential book The Spiritist Fallacy criticized both the more general concepts of Spiritualism, which he considered to be a superficial mix of moralism and spiritual materialism, as well as Spiritism's specific contributions, such as its belief in what he saw as a post-Cartesian, modernist concept of reincarnation distinct from and opposed to its two western predecessors, metempsychosis and transmigration.

The Catechism of the Catholic Church (paragraph 2117) states that "Spiritism often implies divination or magical practices; the Church, for her part, warns the faithful against it".

In Brazil, Catholic priests Carlos Kloppenburg and Óscar González-Quevedo, among others, have written extensively against Spiritism from both a doctrinal and parapsychological perspective. Quevedo, in particular, has sought to show that Spiritism's claims of being a science are invalid. In addition to writing books on the subject, he has also hosted television programs debunking supposed paranormal phenomena, most recently in a series that ran in 2000 on Globo's news program Fantástico. Brazilian Spiritist Hernani Guimarães Andrade has, in turn, written rebuttals to these criticisms.

An article published in the British skeptical magazine The Skeptic also criticizes Spiritism for its association with ufology, parapsychology, animal magnetism, and other pseudosciences.

== In popular culture ==
Spiritism has been the subject of various non-literary works.

=== Soap operas ===
The Brazilian soap opera "Somos Todos Irmãos" (1966), produced by Rede Tupi, is inspired by the novel "A Vingança do Judeu" (The Jew's Revenge) psychographed by the russian medium Vera Kryzhanovskaia. The soap opera A Viagem (1975), produced by TV Tupi, was inspired by the Spiritist novels Nosso Lar and E a Vida Continua... psychographed by Chico Xavier, developing a complex plot addressing concepts such as mediumship, death, spiritual obsession, reincarnation, and others. Rede Globo produced a remake of it in 1994. The soap opera O Profeta (1977), produced by TV Tupi and also remade in 2006 by TV Globo, has as the main character a medium capable of predicting the future.

The productions Anjo de Mim, Alma Gêmea, Escrito nas Estrelas, Amor Eterno Amor, Alto Astral, Além do Tempo, and Espelho da Vida also told stories related to Spiritism.

=== Films ===
The Brazilian film Joelma 23º Andar, was based on the work Somos Seis psychographed by Chico Xavier and is the first in the country with a spiritist theme, portraying the Joelma Fire tragedy, which left 179 dead and over 300 injured (February 1, 1974). Several other films followed, such as Bezerra de Menezes - O Diário de um Espírito (2006), Chico Xavier (2010), Nosso Lar (also in 2010), among others.

== See also ==
- Dowsing
- Spiritualism
- List of Spiritualist organizations, followers of the Fox sisters
- Chico Xavier
- Automatic writing
- Ouija

== Bibliography ==
- Almeida, A. M. de; Neto, Francisco Lotufo (2005). "Spiritist Views of Mental Disorders in Brazil. Transcult Psychiatry". Transcultural Psychiatry. 42 (4): 570–595. doi:10.1177/1363461505058916. PMID 16570518. S2CID 10172858.
- Anjos, Luciano dos (2005). Para Entender Roustaing. Bragança Paulista: Ed. Lachâtre. ISBN 85-88877-39-2.
- Arribas, Celia Da Graça (12 September 2008). Afinal, espiritismo é religião? A doutrina espírita na formação da diversidade religiosa brasileira (Thesis). doi:10.11606/D.8.2008.tde-05012009-171347.
- Bernardo, André (2019). "Como Allan Kardec popularizou o espiritismo no Brasil, o maior país católico do mundo". BBC Brasil.
- Bismael B. Moraes (April 2002). "Kardecismo como Espiritismo: um Conceito". Centro Espirita Ismael.
- Calejo, Marco Antonio (2018). "Entidades espíritas ganham homenagens por boas iniciativas". ALESP.
- "Centre National de Ressources Textuelles et Lexicales – Etymologie du Spiritisme". Ministério Francês de Ensino Superior e Pesquisa. 2012.
- "Diferenças entre o espiritismo e a umbanda". Núcleo Espírita Assistencial "Paz e Amor".
- "Diretriz doutrinária da Federação Espírita do RN". Federação Espírita do Rio Grande do Norte. 2014.
- "Esclarecimentos sobre o que é o Espiritismo". Instituto de Intercâmbio do Pensamento Espírita de Pernambuco.
- "Espiritismo". Dicionário infopédia da Língua Portuguesa, Porto Editora. 2019.
- Giumbelli, Emerson (2008). "Nação espírita: Embora tenha nascido na França, a religião de Kardec encontrou no Brasil sua verdadeira pátria". Revista de História da Biblioteca Nacional. Archived from the original on 6 March 2012.
- Kardec, Allan (2017) [1857]. O Livro dos Espíritos. Rio de Janeiro: Federação Espírita Brasileira. ISBN 9788573288896.
- Kardec, Allan (2013) [1859]. O que é o Espiritismo. Rio de Janeiro: Federação Espírita Brasileira. ISBN 978-85-7328-766-0.
- Kardec, Allan (1861). O Espiritismo na sua expressão mais simples. Rio de Janeiro: Federação Espírita Brasileira.
- Kardec, Allan (2015) [1861]. O Livro dos Médiuns. Rio de Janeiro: Federação Espírita Brasileira.
- Kardec, Allan (2013) [1864]. O Evangelho Segundo o Espiritismo (PDF). Rio de Janeiro: Federação Espírita Brasileira.
- Kardec, Allan (2017) [1865]. O Céu e o Inferno. Rio de Janeiro: Federação Espírita Brasileira.
- Kardec, Allan (1989) [1857]. The Spirits' Book. Translated by Anna Blackwell. Albuquerque, New Mexico: Brotherhood of Life. ISBN 978-0914732259.
- Kardec, Allan (1944) [1868]. A Gênese. Rio de Janeiro: Federação Espírita Brasileira.
- Kardec, Allan (1875). Spiritualist philosophy. The spirits' book. Containing the principles of spiritist doctrine on: the immortality of the soul, the nature of spirits and their relations with men, the moral law, the present life, the future life, and the destiny of the human race – according to the teachings of spirits of high degree. Translated by Blackwell, Anna. Boston: Colby and Rich – via Internet Archive. (An 1875 translation of The spirits' book available online)
- Lang, Alice Beatriz da Silva Gordo (2008). "Espiritismo no Brasil". Cadernos CERU (USP). 19 (2).
- Lucchetti, G.; Aguiar, PR; Braghetta, CC; Vallada, CP; Moreira-Almeida, A; Vallada, H. (2012). "Spiritist psychiatric hospitals in Brazil: integration of conventional psychiatric treatment and spiritual complementary therapy". Cult Med Psychiatry. 36 (1): 124–135. doi:10.1007/s11013-011-9239-6. PMID 22052248. S2CID 14525789.
- Lucchetti, Giancarlo; Daher, Jorge C.; Iandoli, Decio; Gonçalves, Juliane P. B.; Lucchetti, Alessandra L. G. (2013). "Historical and cultural aspects of the pineal gland: comparison between the theories provided by Spiritism in the 1940s and the current scientific evidence" (PDF). Neuro Endocrinology Letters. 34 (8): 745–755. PMID 24522019.
- Millecco, Luiz Antonio (August 1997). "Espiritismo ou Kardecismo?". Mundo Espírita. No. 34. Archived from the original on 24 February 2003.
- Monroe, John Warne (2008). Laboratories of Faith: Mesmerism, Spiritism, and Occultism in Modern France. Cornell University Press. ISBN 978-0-8014-4562-0. OCLC 1083630341.
- Neto, Antonio Augusto Machado de Campos (2007). "A filosofia espírita. O direito natural. O direito justo". Revista da Faculdade de Direito da Universidade de São Paulo. 102.
- Pigliucci, Massimo; Boudry, Maarten (2013). "Goode, Erich. Paranormalism and Pseudoscience as Deviance". Philosophy of pseudoscience: reconsidering the demarcation problem. Chicago: The University of Chicago Press. ISBN 978-0-226-05182-6.
- Pine, Frances; de Pina-Cabral, João (2008). On the Margins of Religion. New York: Berghahn Books. ISBN 978-1-84545-409-8.
- Podmore, Frank (2011) [1902]. Modern Spiritualism: A History and a Criticism. Vol. 1. Cambridge: Cambridge University Press. ISBN 978-1-108-07257-1.
- "Rio Grande do Sul tem maior adesão a religiões afro no país". O Observatório da Cidade de Porto Alegre. 2012.
- Rubin, Nani (2013). "Livro Reconstitui a Gênese do Espiritismo". O Globo.
- Schröder, André (2016). "Por que o espiritismo pegou tanto no Brasil". Superinteressante.
- "Spiritisme". Larousse.
- "Spiritism/Kardecism". University of Cumbria. Archived from the original on 29 April 2001.
- Tyson, Philip; Jones, Dai; Elcock, Jonathan (2011). Psychology in Social Context: Issues and Debates. New Jersey: Wiley-Blackwell. ISBN 978-1-4443-9623-2.
- Vannuchi, Maria Lúcia (2013). "Um olhar sociológico sobre o espiritismo: trajetórias, ideias e práticas". Estudos de Sociologia (UNESP). 18 (34).
- Xavier, Francisco Cândido; Emmanuel (2013) [1940]. O Consolador. Rio de Janeiro: Federação Espírita Brasileira. ISBN 978-85-7328-781-3.
