= Allan Kardec =

French educator, translator, and writer (1804–1869)

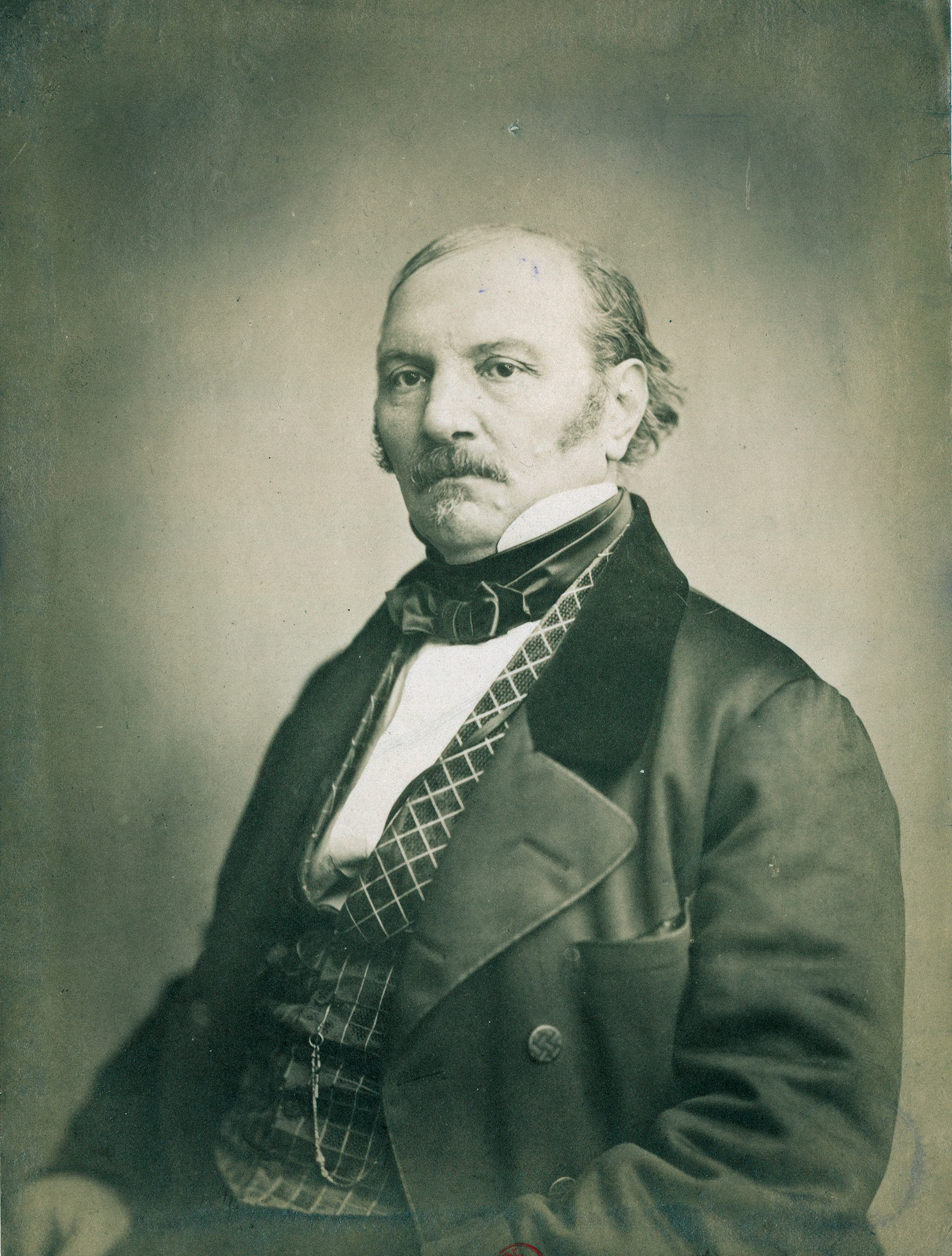
- Born: Hippolyte Léon Denizard Rivail; 3 October 1804; Lyon, France
- Died: 31 March 1869 (aged 64); Paris, France
- Burial place: Père Lachaise Cemetery
- Occupation: Educator
- Known for: Systematizer of Kardecist spiritism
- Spouse: Amélie Gabrielle Boudet (married 1832)

Hippolyte Léon Denizard Rivail (French: [ʁivaj]; 3 October 1804 – 31 March 1869), known by the pen name of Allan Kardec ([kaʁdɛk]), was a French educator, translator, and writer. He is the author of the five books known as the Spiritist Codification, and the founder of Spiritism.

== Early life ==
Rivail was born in Lyon in 1804 and raised as a Roman Catholic. He pursued interests in philosophy and the sciences, and became an acolyte and colleague of Johann Heinrich Pestalozzi. Rivail completed a Bachelor of Arts and a doctorate in medicine. He was also fluent in German, English, Italian, and Spanish, in addition to his native French. Kardec became interested in Protestantism after his education in Switzerland. He was also trained in positivist ideas, although he ended up not being an orthodox positivist.

== Career ==
He was a member of several scholarly societies, including the Historic Institute of Paris (Institut Historique), Society of Natural Sciences of France (Société des Sciences Naturelles de France), Society for the Encouragement of National Industry (Société d'Encouragement pour l'Industrie Nationale), and The Royal Academy of Arras (Académie d'Arras, Société Royale des Sciences, des Lettres et des Arts). He organized and taught free courses for the underprivileged. He was also involved, from the age of 19, with the controversial hypothesis of animal magnetism, being a practitioner of mesmerism.

=== Educator ===
Rivail's work with Pestalozzi helped lay the foundations for the teaching model in schools in France and Germany. For several decades he helped advance Pestalozzi's pedagogy in France, founding schools and working as a teacher, educational writer and translator.

=== Banker ===
In 1839, with a new partner, Mr. Maurice Delachatre, a merchant, he created a so-called "exchange" bank, which aimed to facilitate commercial transactions and thus create new opportunities for trade and industry, in order to support in default of pecuniary resources for the natural products. The duration of the trading bank was fixed by the Chamber of Commerce and Industry at ten years.

=== Spiritualism ===
According to “My predictions concerning spiritualism” as he himself described in his manuscript written between 1855 and 1856, "in May 1855, he met a certain Mr. Fortier, a magnetizer, who took him to Madame de Plainemaison, a medium who lived in the Rue de la Grange Bateliere in Paris, just a step away from the Opera House. In the presence of other guests for the session, he entered into communication with a spirit named Zephyr, who gave him the mission of being the spokesman of the Dead. For him, it was a revelation. He was there, for the first time, witnessing the phenomenon of turntables jumping and running".

== Spiritism ==
Rivail was in his early 50s when he became interested in séances, which were a popular entertainment at the time. Strange phenomena attributed to the action of spirits were considered a novelty, featuring objects that moved or "tapped", purportedly under the control of "spirits". In some cases, this was alleged to be a type of communication: the supposed spirits answered questions by controlling the movements of objects so as to pick out letters to form words, or simply indicate "yes" or "no". (Note: A possible explanation for these movements is the ideomotor phenomenon.) At the time, Franz Mesmer's theory of animal magnetism had become popular. When confronted with the phenomena described, some researchers, including Rivail, pointed out that animal magnetism might explain them. Rivail, however, after seeing a demonstration, dismissed animal magnetism as insufficient to explain his observations.

As a result of these influences, Rivail began his own investigation of psychic phenomena, mainly mediumship. During his initial investigation, he stated that before accepting a spiritual or paranormal cause for some phenomena, it would be necessary first to test if ordinary material causes could explain them. He proposed that fraud, hallucination and unconscious mental activity might explain many phenomena regarded as mediumistic, and also proposed that telepathy and clairvoyance may be responsible.

He compiled over one thousand questions concerning the nature and mechanisms of spirit communications, the reasons for human life on earth, and aspects of the spiritual realm. He asked those questions to ten mediums, all purportedly unknown to each other, and documented their responses. From these, he concluded that the best explanation was that personalities that had survived death were the source of at least some mediumistic communications. He became convinced that the mediums:

- provided accurate information unknown to themselves or others present (e.g. personal information about deceased individuals);
- demonstrated unlearned skills such as writing by illiterate mediums, handwriting similar to the alleged communicating personality, and speaking or writing in a language unknown to the medium (xenoglossy and xenography);
- accurately portrayed a range of personality characteristics of deceased individuals.

He compiled the mediums' responses that were consistent and adapted them into a philosophy that he called Spiritism, which he initially defined as "a science that deals with the nature, origin, and destiny of spirits, and their relation with the corporeal world."

Rivail wrote under the name "Allan Kardec", allegedly following the suggestion of a spirit identified as "Truth". On 18 April 1857, as Allan Kardec, Rivail published his first book on Spiritism, The Spirits Book, comprising a series of answered questions (502 in the first edition and 1,019 in later editions) exploring matters concerning the nature of spirits, the spirit world, and the relationship between the spirit world and the material world. This was followed by a series of other books, including The Medium's Book, The Gospel According to Spiritism, Heaven and Hell and The Genesis According to Spiritism, and by a periodical, the Revue Spirite, which Kardec published until his death. Collectively, the books became known as the Spiritist Codification.

Kardec's research influenced the psychical research of Charles Richet, Camille Flammarion and Gabriel Delanne.

== Personal life ==
=== Family ===
On 6 February 1832 he married Amélie Gabrielle Boudet.

=== Death ===
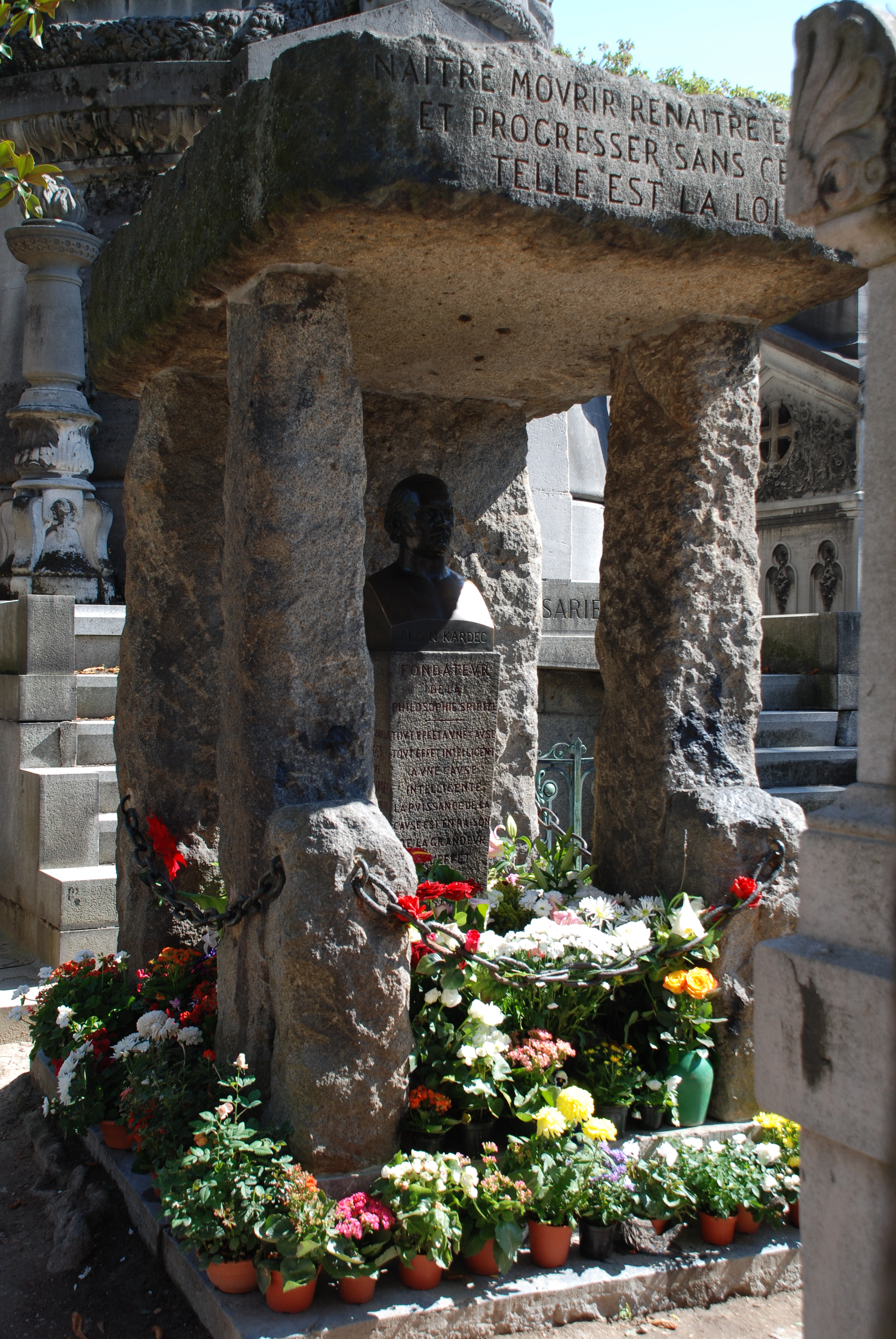
Allan Kardec's grave at Cimetière du Père Lachaise. The inscription says Naitre, mourir, renaitre encore et progresser sans cesse, telle est la loi ("To be born, to die, to be reborn again and keep progressing, that is the law").

After his death caused by aneurysm in 1869, Kardec was buried at the Cimetière du Père Lachaise.

== Writings ==
- Cours pratique et théorique d'arithmétique (1824)
- Plan proposé pour l'amélioration de l'éducation publique (1828)
- Catéchisme grammatical de la langue française (1848)
- Le Livre des Esprits (The Spirits Book), 1857
- Le Livre des Médiums (The Book on Mediums), 1861
- L'Évangile selon le Spiritisme (The Gospel According to Spiritism), 1864
- Le Ciel et L'Enfer (Heaven and Hell), 1865
- La Genèse (Genesis or, The Genesis According to Spiritism), 1868
