= The Gospel According to Spiritism =

1864 book by Allan Kardec

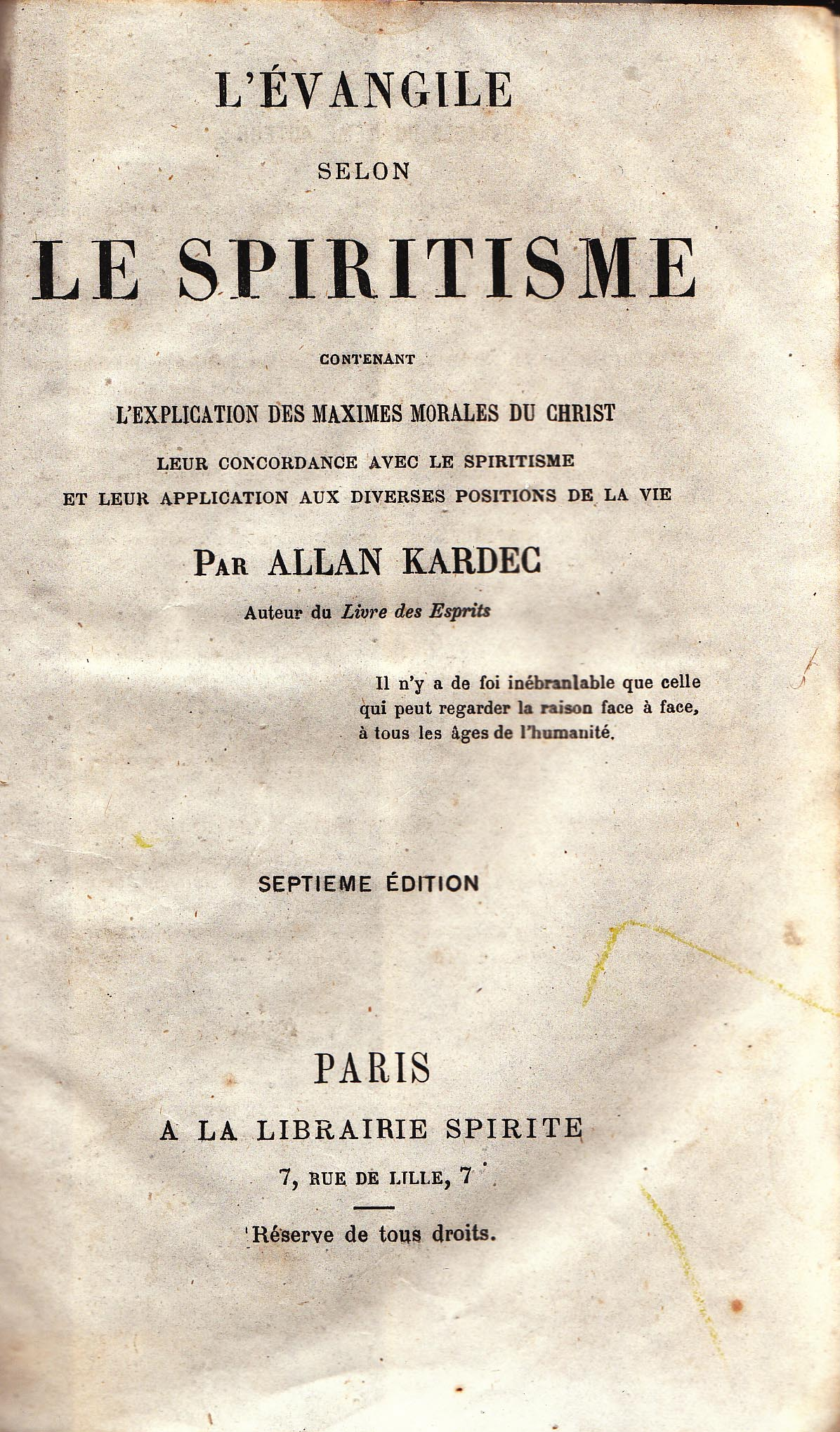

The Gospel According to Spiritism (L'Évangile Selon le Spiritisme in French), by Allan Kardec, is a book published in 1864 that relates the teachings of Jesus to Kardecist Spiritism, the moral and religious philosophy that Kardec had been preaching. It is intended to demonstrate that Spiritism clarifies and extends the most important teachings of Jesus. It is one of the five fundamental works of Kardecist Spiritism.

Kardec wrote in The Gospel According to Spiritism that he viewed Spiritism as "the new science that would reveal to men, by means of irrefutable proofs, the existence and nature of the spiritual world and its relationship with the material world". He incorporated ideas from positivism, evolution, and empiricism, as well as Hindu teachings on karma and reincarnation, and applied them to spiritualism.

The book attracted a lot of reaction from the Catholic Church and was indexed (added to the List of Prohibited Books). The first edition had been titled Imitation de l'Évangile (An Imitation of the Gospels), but the third, and definitive edition (1865) had the book renamed and profusely corrected (mostly typos or supposed mistakes in channeling), edited and expanded.

== Contents ==
The book, the best documented and the most organised of the five fundamental works of Kardecist Spiritism, contains one introductory part and 28 chapters. The first 27 are each dedicated to dissecting one particular verse of the Gospels and the last one is a collection of prayers inspired by elevated spirits.

Kardec looked forward to basing his teachings in biblical knowledge, as well as the messages he received from his guiding spirits. Therefore, the first part of the Gospel According to Spiritism is dedicated to a series of observations and clarifications intended to situate its arguments and doctrine so that those more familiar with exegesis would find their way throughout it more easily.

=== Introduction ===
The first item of the introduction argues that the currently existing translations of the Gospels were imperfect and were effectively unintelligible without proper relation to scholarly research about the culture and the customs of the peoples of the Middle-East. As the entirety of the message of Christ cannot be easily grasped from the existing texts about his life, Kardec argues that instead of handpicking the details, we should pay more attention to his teachings and more significant deeds. This is what he tries to do in this book.

The second item argues that Spiritism is based on the highest and truer Christian morality: that it descends directly from the key teaching of Jesus. Kardec also argues that what makes the spiritist doctrine reliable is that it is not self-contradictory: the elevated spirits, channeled by mediums of goodwill all gave the same message and this message is logically consistent both internally and with what Christ taught.

The third part is a rough guide to the Gospels, explaining the meaning of foreign concepts and new words only found there.

The fourth part explains that even before Christ theories similar to Spiritism could be found in the Greek philosophy, notably in Socrates and Plato (Spiritists have both philosophers in high esteem and consider them as precursors of Christ).

=== Chapters ===
These observations are followed by 27 doctrinal chapters which are comments on quotes of Christ.

The last chapter is a collection of prayers channeled by elevated spirits, intended as examples of how we are supposed to pray.

== Doctrinal Principles ==
The key aspects of the Gospel According to Spiritism are:

- The revelation of God is continuous because mankind is slowly evolving to a higher level, making it necessary to perfect the doctrine. The first revelation was through Moses, the second through Christ (modern Spiritists argue that it was previously tried in Greece with Socrates but failed), and the third one was from God himself through his messengers, the several spirits that worked on the Codification (Spiritism).
- Spirits are immortal and live several lives (reincarnations) to perfect their moral and their intelligence until they are able to be in the presence of God.
- Every revelation elaborates on the previous, instead of revoking it.
- Morality is mostly based on love (spiritual love, that is, not carnal love) for everyone and anyone.
- Love must be put to practice.
- Charity (the practice of love) must not seek retribution.
- Religion must be free.
- Marriage is not indissoluble, if there is no love, especially no fidelity to the former love anymore, this proves that the couple is no longer bounded, so the divorce would be the final and natural act of separation for those who choose it.
- Outside charity there is no salvation. This is the main motto of Spiritism.
- Everyone will eventually be saved, though it may take an unimaginably long time for some (see universal reconciliation).

== See also ==
- The Spirits Book
- Spiritism
