= Libertação =

1949 book by Chico Xavier

- Author: Chico Xavier (medium); authorship attributed to André Luiz (spirit)
- Language: Portuguese
- Series: Life in the Spirit World (vol. 6)
- Subject: Spiritism, spiritual obsession
- Genre: Spiritist novel
- Publisher: Brazilian Spiritist Federation
- Publication date: 1949
- Publication place: Brazil
- Pages: 288
- ISBN: 9788573288186
- Preceded by: No Mundo Maior (1947)
- Followed by: Entre a Terra e o Céu (1954)

Libertação (English: Liberation) is a Spiritist book psychographed by the Brazilian medium Chico Xavier and attributed to the spirit André Luiz. Published in 1949 by the Brazilian Spiritist Federation (FEB), it is the sixth of the thirteen volumes of the series Life in the Spirit World (A Vida no Mundo Espiritual), released between 1944 and 1968.

Narrated in the first person, the book follows a team of spirits on a mission to the lower regions of the spirit world, with the aim of freeing a woman from a process of spiritual obsession and of converting the leader of the obsessors, Gregório. According to historian Ana Lorym Soares, the book brought the topic of the perispirit into the debates of the Spiritist movement at a time when the theses of the series were being contested by part of the Brazilian Spiritist community.

== Publication and context ==
The Life in the Spirit World series brings together books, mostly first-person novels, whose authorship Chico Xavier and the FEB attributed to André Luiz, who was said to have been a physician in Rio de Janeiro and who, after his death, went on to describe life in the spiritual zones close to Earth. Anthropologist Bernardo Lewgoy notes that André Luiz was regarded as the most "scientific", "journalistic" and "sociological" of the spirits who dictated messages to the medium.

Libertação was published in 1949, after No Mundo Maior (In the Greater World, 1947), and was followed by Entre a Terra e o Céu (Between Heaven and Earth, 1954). According to Soares, the FEB and the medium regarded the publication of these books as a "mission" to spread the doctrine, and the books circulated mainly through the institutions, bookshops and periodicals of the Spiritist milieu itself.

== Plot ==
The book opens with a preface attributed to the spirit Emmanuel, which tells an Egyptian legend about a little red fish that leaves the pond where it was born and, on returning, tries in vain to convince its former companions that a greater world exists.

André Luiz recounts a mission led by the instructor Gúbio, in which his companion Elói also takes part. The task is requested by Matilde, a spirit of elevated standing in the narrative, who wishes to lead Gregório, her son in a previous existence, back to the good. Presented as a priest, Gregório leads a phalanx of hundreds of spirits in the lower regions and directs the obsession of Margarida, an incarnate woman who had lived in the same period as he did in a past existence and who, according to the account, had been Gúbio's daughter in another life.

To reach Gregório, the team crosses regions of darkness and enters a city of the lower zones, described as a cluster of alleys and decaying houses, populated by suffering and mutilated spirits; in describing the landscape, the narrator evokes the "dark wood" of Dante Alighieri's Divine Comedy. Received by Gregório, the three obtain permission to join the group that is obsessing Margarida. At her house they meet Saldanha, who directs the obsessors there, and they describe ovoid forms attached to the sick woman's brain. Gúbio gradually wins Saldanha's trust, and the obsessive process is undone with the help of a mediumistic meeting held at a small Spiritist center.

In the ending, Gregório rebels and marches against Gúbio at the head of phalanxes from the lower regions. Matilde manifests herself to her son, and Gregório, shaken by the reunion with his mother, surrenders and is rescued by the team.

== Themes ==
=== Obsession and assistance to the obsessors ===
In the narrative, spiritual assistance is directed at both the victim and the obsessors: the team does not confront Saldanha's group by force but seeks to win it over, and the mission ends with the conversion of the phalanx's leader himself. The publisher's synopsis summarizes the book as an account of the action of obsessing spirits on incarnate people and of the subsequent intervention of higher spirits in favor of their conversion to the good.

=== Ovoid forms ===
Among the elements described in the book are the so-called ovoid forms: spirits that, according to the narrator, had "worn out" their perispirit and lost their human form, remaining magnetically bound to people they hate.

=== Interaction during sleep ===
In the chapter "Observações e novidades" ("Observations and news"), the instructor Gúbio states that, at certain hours of the night, three quarters of the population of each hemisphere, partially detached from the body by sleep, are in contact with the spirit world, and that most of them remain in low-vibration regions such as the one the team is crossing. According to the instructor, dramas and crimes that later unfold in physical life originate in these places, and even more tragic events are averted only by the action of protecting spirits.

=== Mother–son relationship ===
For Bernardo Lewgoy, the relationship between mother and son plays a central role in the unfolding of the plot of Libertação. The anthropologist cites the book as an example of the importance given to domestic devotion and to the family and religious role of the mother in several works psychographed by Chico Xavier.

=== Reading as a hero's journey ===
Jander Fernandes Martins and Vitória Duarte Wingert analyzed the books of the series in light of Joseph Campbell's hero's journey. In the authors' reading, Gúbio and Matilde are among the guides and protectors who prepare André Luiz for the crossing of the lower regions, and the descent into the city of shadows in Libertação illustrates the "road of trials" stage. Matilde is associated with the "meeting with the goddess" stage and Gúbio with "atonement with the father".

== Reception ==
=== Within the Spiritist movement ===
The book appeared at a time when the works of André Luiz were being contested within the Spiritist movement. In a letter of November 1948 to the president of the FEB, Antônio Wantuil de Freitas, Chico Xavier mentioned that a group from Rio Grande do Sul intended to present a thesis against these works at the 1949 Spiritist unification congress in São Paulo. According to Soares, the sixth volume of the series brought the topic of the perispirit into the discussion, which became a point of contention, and Zêus Wantuil, son of the FEB president and an assistant in the editorial work, wrote a text aimed at settling the controversy.

Among favorable readers, A. Assis, in a review of Entre a Terra e o Céu published in 1954 in Reformador, the FEB's official magazine, recalled the "shivers" he had felt when reading Missionários da Luz (Missionaries of the Light) and Libertação.

Spiritist writer Hermínio C. Miranda states in Diálogo com as Sombras (Dialogue with the Shadows) that the city of darkness visited by the team was ruled by a former pope, whose liberation would be the central theme of the work, without indicating which pope this was. Miranda adds an interpretation of his own, which he acknowledges is not explicit in the book: that former clergymen held nocturnal meetings in these regions and preserved in the spirit world vestments, "thrones", courts and ceremonies similar to those they had kept on Earth.

Spiritist writer Suely Caldas Schubert draws on Libertação in Obsessão/Desobsessão (Obsession/Disobsession), a book on the Spiritist prevention and treatment of obsession. In classifying the forms of obsession, she cites the city described in the book as an example of a center in the lower regions where spirits presenting themselves as judges impose a cruel "justice" on other indebted spirits. In discussing the obsessive process, she takes Margarida's case as an example of organized harassment, meticulously carried out by obsessors accompanied by hypnotist spirits, who resorted to what the author calls "malefic vibrations" to weaken the victim.

=== Circulation ===
According to Soares, among the nearly one hundred titles Chico Xavier published in that period, the books of the series were, with the exception of Parnaso de Além-Túmulo, among the most discussed, and they rank among the medium's best-selling works; all of them have been translated into several languages. The FEB keeps Libertação in print, in paperback and in digital format.

== See also ==
- Nosso Lar
- Spiritist literature
