= Brasil, Coração do Mundo, Pátria do Evangelho =

1938 Brazilian Spiritist book by Chico Xavier

- Author: Francisco Cândido Xavier (medium); Humberto de Campos (attributed spirit author)
- Original title: Brasil, Coração do Mundo, Pátria do Evangelho
- Language: Portuguese
- Subject: History of Brazil from a Spiritist perspective
- Genre: Spiritist literature
- Publisher: Brazilian Spiritist Federation
- Publication date: 1938
- Publication place: Brazil
- Pages: Introduction and 30 chapters
- ISBN: 978-85-7328-796-7

Brasil, Coração do Mundo, Pátria do Evangelho (lit. 'Brazil, Heart of the World, Homeland of the Gospel') is a Spiritist book produced through automatic writing (psicografia) by the Brazilian medium Chico Xavier and published by the Brazilian Spiritist Federation (FEB) in 1938. According to Spiritist doctrine, the work was dictated by the spirit of the writer Humberto de Campos, who had died in 1934, and its preface is attributed to the spirit Emmanuel.

The book recounts the history of Brazil from the 10th to the 20th century as the fulfillment of a plan devised by Jesus in the spiritual world: the country would have been chosen to receive the "tree of the Gospel" and to become the "heart of the world", a mission culminating in the spread of Spiritism. According to its publisher, it has sold more than one million copies. The FEB also adopted it as a programmatic reference for the Brazilian Spiritist movement, to the point that it is cited in the first clause of the 1949 Pacto Áureo (Golden Pact).

Published in the first year of the Estado Novo dictatorship, the book has been studied by historians, anthropologists and scholars of religion as a national founding myth in a Spiritist key, marked by nationalism, the exaltation of racial mixing, and the defense of social order, themes that converged with the official discourse of the Getúlio Vargas government.

== Historical context ==
The book appeared at a time of competition within Brazil's religious field. During the 1930s, the Catholic Church, led in Rio de Janeiro by Cardinal Sebastião Leme, sought to regain the influence it had lost with the separation of church and state in 1889, in a project known as neocristandade ("neo-Christendom"). Spiritists, Protestants and Freemasons responded by defending the secular state, for instance through the Coligação Nacional Pró-Estado Leigo (National Coalition for a Secular State), founded in 1931.

At the same time, Spiritist healing practices were treated by law as quackery and the illegal practice of medicine. According to Hida and Coutinho, after the 1937 coup the FEB headquarters was closed for three days for a police inquiry, and Spiritist leaders were detained. In this setting, the FEB shifted its emphasis toward social assistance and so-called "consoling literature", of which Chico Xavier's psychographed works became the main product.

== Authorship ==
The work belongs to the body of writing that Chico Xavier attributed to the spirit of Humberto de Campos, a journalist from Maranhão, member of the Brazilian Academy of Letters from 1919, and a federal deputy until the Revolution of 1930. During his lifetime, Campos had commented ironically on the poems of Parnaso de Além-Túmulo (1932), Xavier's first book. After his death in December 1934, he began, in 1935, to appear as the author of psychographed chronicles published in the FEB magazine Reformador.

The texts attributed to the writer were later collected in books, including Crônicas de Além-Túmulo (1937), Brasil, Coração do Mundo, Pátria do Evangelho (1938), Novas Mensagens (1940) and Boa Nova (1941). Researchers describe this authorship arrangement as "inter-authorship": the medium is the empirical author, legally and institutionally responsible for the work, while the spirit is presented as its intellectual author.

=== The 1944 lawsuit ===
In 1944, the writer's widow, Catharina Vergolino de Campos, and their sons filed a declaratory action against the FEB and Chico Xavier. They asked the court to declare whether or not the works came from the spirit of Humberto de Campos and, if so, to assign the copyright to the family.

In a ruling of 23 August 1944, judge João Frederico Mourão Russell of the 8th Civil Court of the Federal District dismissed the action for lack of standing, without ruling on the question of authorship. The appeal was rejected by the Court of Appeal. The defense was led by lawyer Miguel Timponi, who documented the case in the book A Psicografia ante os Tribunais ("Psychography Before the Courts"). After the lawsuit, the texts attributed to Humberto de Campos were signed with the pseudonym "Irmão X" ("Brother X").

== Structure and content ==
The book opens with a preface signed by Emmanuel, which states its aim as clarifying the remote origins of the "Homeland of the Gospel". It is followed by the narrator's introduction and thirty chapters. The narrator claims to report what took place both among the living and on the spiritual plane; for earthly events he refers to historical documents, and for spiritual ones to the "traditions of the spiritual world".

=== Characters ===
- Jesus, who conceives the plan to transplant the Gospel to a new land.
- Helil, a spiritual entity who would be reincarnated as Prince Henry the Navigator, associated with the School of Sagres.
- Ismael, the spirit charged with guiding Brazil and carrying out Christ's designs.

=== Plot ===
1. Saddened by the wars of the Middle Ages, Jesus travels with Helil through lands still unknown to Europeans and chooses the region beneath the Southern Cross as the "heart of the world".
2. Portugal, described as the humblest and most hard-working nation in Europe, is assigned to begin the work; later the narrator reproaches it for having been corrupted by the wealth of its conquests.
3. The formation of the Brazilian people is presented as a spiritual plan: the Indigenous peoples would be the "simple of heart", the Portuguese convicts the "thirsty for justice", and the enslaved Africans the expression of the "humble and afflicted".
4. Episodes of colonization, the bandeirantes, the arrival of John VI, Independence, Abolition and the Republic are narrated as accompanied by spiritual messengers; Abolition and the Republic appear as bloodless transformations, and territorial unity as Christ's design.
5. The final chapters describe the rise of Spiritism in the country. Chapter 28 praises Bezerra de Menezes and FEB leaders, and states that in Brazil Spiritism would be Christianity revived. Chapter 30 addresses the political dilemmas of the 1930s.

According to Lewgoy, the narrative places Rio de Janeiro and Minas Gerais as the centers from which the project radiates, in contrast with influences said to come from the Amazon and the Río de la Plata region.

== Themes ==
=== Chosen nation and spiritual mission ===
The central theme is the election of Brazil as the "Homeland of the Gospel", tasked with teaching humanity fraternity, charity and a "reasoned faith", understood as a synthesis of science and religion. Paz e Albuquerque analyzes how the book builds two linked symbolic categories: a region, the "heart of the world", and a nation, the "Homeland of the Gospel".

=== The three races and miscegenation ===
The work takes up the narrative of the "three races" that formed Brazil, present in the historiography of the Brazilian Historic and Geographic Institute since the 19th century, and quotes a line by Olavo Bilac describing the Brazilian soul as the flower of "three sad races". Alves, Cunha and Valério identify four representations of national identity in the text:

Representation	How it appears in the book
Chosen nation	Brazil was planned to be the spiritual granary of the world
Mixed people	The coexistence of the three races is the basis of Brazilian fraternity
Black population	Enslaved Africans would have agreed, before incarnating, to suffer for the building of the country, and are therefore integrated into the nation
Gentleness	Major political changes would happen without revolutionary violence

For these authors, the book's treatment of slavery is ambiguous: it condemns slavery as a product of European greed, yet treats the suffering of the enslaved as the spiritual foundation of national fraternity. Its idea of full racial integration brings it close to the thesis of racial democracy associated with Gilberto Freyre and appropriated by Estado Novo propaganda.

=== Order, anti-communism and criticism of Catholicism ===
The book urges Brazilians to abandon revolutions and to make the nation great through order and work. In the final chapter it condemns communism, accepts repressive measures "for the good of the collectivity", and calls on capital to fund campaigns for education, sanitation and employment. At the same time, it criticizes episodes in the history of the Catholic Church, such as the Inquisition introduced in Portugal by John III and the pontificate of Leo X.

== Reception and influence ==
=== Within the Spiritist movement ===
The FEB invested in promoting the book, which came to serve as a doctrinal reference complementing the works of Allan Kardec. On 5 October 1949, the FEB and state federations signed the Pacto Áureo in Rio de Janeiro, an agreement to unify the Spiritist movement. According to Arribas, as cited by Hida and Coutinho, the document required Spiritists to put into practice the plan set out in the book, to seek doctrinal consensus, and to mark their differences from Umbanda.

The book's praise of the FEB and its leaders also caused friction with other federative bodies that disputed the Rio-based institution's leadership.

=== Beyond Kardecist Spiritism ===
The narrative of Brazil as the "heart of the world" appears frequently in Umbanda literature, indicating that Chico Xavier's ideas circulated beyond Spiritist circles.

=== Revival in the 21st century ===
According to Hida and Coutinho, the book regained prominence between 2018 and 2022: it was adapted for the stage in 2021, the same year Law No. 14,201 inscribed Chico Xavier's name in the Book of Heroes and Heroines of the Homeland. The authors note that part of the Spiritist movement was uncomfortable with the political use of the work during that period.

=== Editions ===
The first edition was published by the FEB in 1938. The same publisher has kept it in print, with a 9th edition in 1971, a 26th in 2000 and a new edition in 2019.

== Scholarly analysis ==
Academic literature on the work does not address the authenticity of mediumship; it treats the book as a historical source and a document of its time.

- Founding myth and narrative theology. For anthropologist Bernardo Lewgoy, the book reads the formation of the nation as the result of a program set on a higher spiritual plane and projects a Brazilian vocation that triumphs in Kardecism. Hida and Coutinho classify it both as a founding myth, in the sense proposed by Marilena Chaui, and as Spiritist narrative theology.
- Symbolic capital and the Estado Novo. Drawing on Pierre Bourdieu and Sinuê Miguel, the same authors argue that the work served as symbolic capital that allowed the FEB to present itself as the spokesperson for Kardecism before the Vargas government and to secure greater tolerance for Spiritist practices, at a time when Umbanda and Candomblé remained under police repression.
- Nationalism and authoritarianism. A study published in Tempos Históricos (2017), drawing on Miguel, sees the book and Pietro Ubaldi's A Grande Síntese as expressions of Spiritists' alignment with the nationalism and authoritarianism of the period.
- Dialogue with school culture. Alves, Cunha and Valério note that the content resembles Brazilian school history textbooks of the first half of the 20th century and the patriotic boosterism of works such as Por que me ufano do meu país by Afonso Celso.

Spiritist authors, for their part, read the book as a revelation about Brazil's spiritual mission, an interpretation officially adopted by the FEB.

== See also ==
- Chico Xavier
- Humberto de Campos
- Brazilian Spiritist Federation
