= A Caminho da Luz =

- Author: Emmanuel / Francisco Cândido Xavier
- Language: Portuguese
- Series: Emmanuel
- Subject: History of civilization according to Spiritism
- Publisher: FEB
- Publication date: 1939
- Publication place: Brazil
- Pages: 206
- ISBN: 8573285559

A Caminho da Luz (English: On the Way to the Light, subtitle: History of civilization in the light of Spiritism) is a book psychographed by the Brazilian medium Francisco Cândido Xavier, who attributed its authorship to the spirit Emmanuel. Dictated between August 17 and September 21, 1938, the work was published in early 1939 by the Brazilian Spiritist Federation (FEB).

The work presents a synthesis of the history of humanity, from the formation of the Earth to the 20th century, interpreted according to Spiritist doctrine. Its central thesis is that Jesus is the spiritual governor of the planet and that missionary spirits, whether incarnated or not, have guided the course of civilizations. The text itself declares that it does not claim to be a historical work, but rather a contribution of a religious nature. Among the ideas it disseminated is the narrative of exiled spirits from a world in the Capella star system, which was later revisited by other Spiritist authors, such as Edgard Armond, and by doctrinal study materials. In a survey regarding the best Spiritist books of the 20th century, the book ranked in sixth place.

== Context ==
Chico Xavier claimed to have met Emmanuel, whom he came to consider his spiritual mentor, in 1931, while living in Pedro Leopoldo, Minas Gerais. Starting with Parnaso de Além-Túmulo (1932), his works began to be published by the FEB, to which the medium ceded the copyrights. In the 1930s, in addition to novels attributed to Emmanuel, the medium published Brazil, Heart of the World, Homeland of the Gospel (1938), attributed to the spirit Humberto de Campos, in which, according to anthropologist Bernardo Lewgoy, the country's history receives a mythical and theological interpretation. In that book, Christ appears as the spiritual governor of the Earth, and the formation of the nation is read as the execution of a plan drawn up in the spiritual world. For Lewgoy, Chico Xavier's output during this period gave Brazilian Spiritism a literary and national feature, along with a marked Christian character.

A Caminho da Luz explicitly dialogues with Brazil, Heart of the World, Homeland of the Gospel. In the foreword, a message dated August 17, 1938, Emmanuel states that Humberto de Campos's book had revealed the collective mission of a country, whereas the new work would limit itself to notes on great missionaries and vanished peoples, with the goal of showing the position of the Gospel in relation to religions and philosophies.

=== Composition and Historical Circumstances ===
According to the title page of the FEB editions, the book was dictated from August 17 to September 21, 1938. Spiritist writer Marcus De Mario notes that the text was written in just over thirty days and published a few months before the start of the Second World War. The work bears marks of this context: the introduction speaks of the painful transitions announced for the 20th century and the dictators of the time; the chapter on Greece compares the regime of Sparta to Germany and Russia at that time and associates Athens with modern democracies; and the chapter on China comments on the Japanese invasion then underway. In later editions, an editor's note in the chapter on the people of Israel clarifies that the book was written ten years before the creation of the State of Israel.

== Publication and Editions ==
The first edition was released by the FEB in 1939, a year that appears in the copyright registration of subsequent editions. The 22nd edition, from 1996, corresponded to the printing of the 219th to 243rd thousandth copy, indicating an accumulated print run of 243,000 copies by then. The FEB continued to reprint the book and also published an English translation, titled On the Way to the Light.

== Structure ==
The book covers the history of civilization, highlighting events that transformed the planet from the perspective of spirituality. It opens with a foreword and an introduction, followed by 25 chapters divided into topics, and ends with a conclusion.

Topics and chapters covered include:

- The planetary genesis (Formation of the Earth and the Moon);
- Organized life (Origin of life and evolution);
- The Adamic Races (The Capella system and exiled spirits);
- The Egyptian civilization;
- India (The Aryans, caste system, the Vedas);
- The Indo-European family;
- The People of Israel (Moses and monotheism);
- Age-old China (Fu Xi, Confucius, Lao Tzu);
- The great religions of the past;
- Greece and the mission of Socrates;
- Rome and the deviations of the Roman Empire;
- The coming of Jesus and the subsequent Christian movement;
- The invasion of the barbarians and the origins of the Middle Ages;
- The medieval Church, Byzantine Empire, Islam, and feudalism;
- The Crusades and the abuse of religious power;
- The renaissance of the world and colonization of the Americas;
- The Protestant Reformation, US independence, and the French Revolution;
- The 19th Century, Allan Kardec, and the abolition of slavery;
- Spiritism, the Gospel, and perspectives for the future.

== Content ==
=== Origin of the Earth and Life ===
The first two chapters describe the formation of the planet and of life as the work of a community of pure spirits, of which Jesus is said to be a member; according to the text, this community has only gathered in the vicinity of Earth twice: when the planet was formed and when the coming of Jesus was decided. Jesus is described as the sculptor of the globe, who, alongside legions of spiritual workers, supposedly planned the Moon, the atmosphere, and the appearance of protoplasm. The book accepts the evolution of species from unicellular organisms but presents it as the result of experiments conducted by spiritual agents, and interprets Adam and Eve as a symbolic memory of spirits exiled on Earth.

=== The Adamic Races and the Capella System ===
The third chapter introduces the most well-known narrative of the book. According to the text, one of the planets in the Capella system, a star in the constellation Auriga, had reached the end of a grand evolutionary cycle. A few million spirits who resisted the moral progress of that humanity were then transferred to Earth, where they were welcomed by Jesus and reincarnated among primitive populations. The work claims that the white races descended from these spirits and that they gathered into four major groups (the Aryans, the Egyptians, the people of Israel, and the castes of India), whose contact propelled the progress of the pre-existing yellow and black races. In a note, Emmanuel argues that the incarnation of these spirits among primitive peoples did not represent regression, but a measure of justice according to the merit of each individual. The memory of the lost world would explain, according to the book, the biblical tradition of a lost paradise and the messianic expectations of various peoples.

The narrative expands on the "Adamic race" hypothesis presented by Allan Kardec in Chapter XI of Genesis (1868), according to which this race originated from a colony of spirits coming from another world to an already populated Earth; in A Caminho da Luz, this origin is explicitly identified as the Capella system.

=== Ancient Civilizations ===
Chapters IV to XI cover the civilizations of Antiquity. The Egyptians are presented as the exiles with the fewest moral debts, who allegedly returned to Capella after leaving the record of their knowledge in the pyramids. The book attributes mastery of psychic sciences to Egyptian priests, asserts that the measurements of the pyramids encode astronomical data, and links the death of Lord Carnarvon (connected to Tutankhamun's tomb) to the magnetic charge of the royal tombs.

The Hindus are portrayed as another branch of exiles and ancestors of the Aryan peoples of Europe, which would explain the affinity of European languages with Sanskrit. The Indo-Europeans are described as the most rebellious among the exiles, but also as the only ones who mingled with the native peoples they encountered—a trait the work considers their greatest virtue. The Hebrews appear as the most homogeneous group and the ones responsible for spreading monotheism, with Moses acting as a medium receiving the Decalogue from Christ's emissaries. China is treated as the oldest civilization, already organized before the arrival of the exiles, with Fu Xi, Lao Tzu, and Confucius acting as missionaries.

Chapter IX maintains that all great religions have a common origin in envoys of Christ, citing Buddha, Moses, and Muhammad. In Greece, Socrates is presented as a precursor of Christian principles.

=== Christianity and the Middle Ages ===
From Chapter XII onwards, the book follows the history of Christianity: the birth of Jesus and his relationship with the Essenes, Paul's mission, the interpretation of Revelation, the martyrs, Constantine, and the formation of the papacy. It is followed by chapters on the fall of the Roman Empire, the Byzantine Empire, Islam, feudalism, the Inquisition, and the Crusades. Chapter XVIII deals specifically with the abuses of religious power, offering Francis of Assisi and the Franciscans as a counterpoint.

=== Modern Era and Spiritism ===
The final chapters cover the Renaissance, the colonization of the Americas (associated with a spiritually planned mission), the Reformation, US independence, the French Revolution, and the 19th century with Allan Kardec, the abolition of slavery, and socialism. In the last chapter, Spiritism is presented as the Consoler promised by Jesus and as a revived Christianity, capable of supporting humanity during a period that the text describes as the decline of Western civilization.

== Themes and Interpretation ==
For Marcus De Mario, the work is often hastily classified as a history book, when its declared purpose is to show Jesus's action as the spiritual governor of the Earth, whether directly or through reincarnated missionaries, and the participation of spirits in human events, many of which had been pre-planned in the spiritual realm. According to him, Emmanuel follows the known historical chronology without making extraordinary historical revelations. Throughout the book, figures such as Moses, Lao Tzu, Confucius, Buddha, Socrates, and Kardec are presented as envoys of Christ, and collective events like wars and enslavements are interpreted as trials or expiations for entire peoples.

== Reception and Influence ==
In a survey by the Candeia Organizations, which consulted prominent figures in the Brazilian Spiritist movement to elect the ten best Spiritist books of the 20th century, A Caminho da Luz ranked in sixth place on a list where seven of the titles were psychographed by Chico Xavier.

The narrative about Capella became one of the most widespread elements of the work. Edgard Armond, in Os Exilados da Capela (The Exiles of Capella), cites A Caminho da Luz as one of his sources and develops the theme in greater detail. Doctrinal study materials present the Capella exiles as the origin of the Adamic race, referencing Emmanuel's book and Kardec's Genesis.

== See also ==
- Chico Xavier
- Emmanuel (spirit)
- Brazil, Heart of the World, Homeland of the Gospel
- Two Thousand Years Ago
- Spiritism in Brazil
