= Nosso Lar 3: Vida Eterna =

- Directed by: Wagner de Assis
- Written by: Wagner de Assis
- Based on: Workers of the Life Eternal by Chico Xavier
- Produced by: Iafa Britz
- Starring: Fábio Assunção; Carol Castro; Renato Prieto; Rod Carvalho; Othon Bastos; Márcio Vito; Renata Tobelem; Dandara Albuquerque
- Music by: Trevor Gureckis; Landon Knoblock
- Production company: Cinética Filmes
- Distributed by: Buena Vista International
- Release date: 21 January 2027
- Country: Brazil
- Language: Portuguese

Nosso Lar 3: Vida Eterna is an upcoming Brazilian drama film, written and directed by Wagner de Assis, with its premiere scheduled for January 21, 2027. The screenplay was based on the novel Workers of the Life Eternal (1946), psychographed by the spiritist medium Chico Xavier, under the influence of the spirit of André Luiz.

A sequel to Nosso Lar 2: Os Mensageiros, the film revolves around a couple who, despite being forced to part ways in the earthly realm, reunite on opposing sides in the spiritual world. In addition to Renato Prieto reprising his role as André Luiz, the film features Fábio Assunção and Carol Castro in the leading roles.

== Plot ==
Zenóbia and Domênico fell in love while living in the earthly world; however, by a decision of Zenóbia's father, the two were no longer permitted to remain together. They followed separate paths until, in the spiritual world, Domênico became the leader of darkness, while Zenóbia assumed a position of leadership as a light-bearing force within the shadows, venturing into sombre abysses to rescue lost spirits. Upon learning that the love of her life resides in the shadowy realm, she embarks upon a perilous mission to rescue him.

== Cast ==
- Fábio Assunção as Domênico
- Rod Carvalho as Humberto
- Carol Castro as Zenóbia
- Othon Bastos as Governor Anacleto
- Renato Prieto as André Luiz
- Márcio Vito as Pardini
- Renata Tobelem as Wilma
- Dandara Albuquerque as Dotora
- Pedro Zurawski
- Antônio Zeni as Young Domênico
- Talita Castro as Ernestina
- Helga Nemeczyk as Carlinda
- Anna Kutner as Luciana
- Beatriz Alcântara as Young Zenóbia
- Alle Franco as Altivo

== Production ==
In November 2024, during D23 Brazil, following the success of Nosso Lar 2: Os Mensageiros, Disney officially announced a sequel entitled Nosso Lar 3: Vida Eterna, with Wagner de Assis returning as director and screenwriter, Iafa Britz as producer, and Cinética Filmes as production company, originally Star Original Productions was confirmed as distributor, but Disney retired the Star brand name, with this, it will be under the Buena Vista International label. It was also confirmed that the film would be based upon Chico Xavier's work Obreiros da Vida Eterna.

In July 2025, Carol Castro and Fábio Assunção were confirmed in the leading roles as Zenóbia and Domênico, with filming commencing in Rio de Janeiro on July 6 of the same year. Castro and Assunção had previously portrayed a romantic couple in the telenovela Garota do Momento.

On August 27, 2025, director Wagner de Assis confirmed the completion of principal photography after 33 days of production.

Composers Trevor Gureckis and Landon Knoblock signed on to compose the score for Nosso Lar 3. Trevor is a long time collaborator of director Wagner de Assis and was also Philip Glass's Music Assistant at the time of Nosso Lar 1: providing additional arrangements and orchestrations for the first film.
