= Othon Bastos =

Brazilian actor (born 1933)

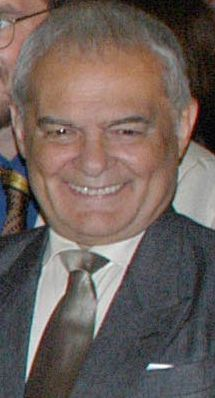
- Bastos in 2005.
- Born: Othon José de Almeida Bastos; 23 May 1933 (age 93); Tucano, Bahia, Brazil
- Occupation: Actor
- Years active: 1962–present

Othon José de Almeida Bastos (born 23 May 1933) is a Brazilian actor. He has appeared in 50 films since 1962.

== Filmography ==
Film
Year	Title	Role	Notes
1962	O Pagador de Promessas	The Reporter	
1964	Black God, White Devil	Corisco	
1969	Antonio das Mortes	Professor	
1970	Of Gods and the Undead	The Man	
1972	S. Bernardo		
1976	The Last Plantation		
1982	Heart and Guts		
1997	Four Days in September		
1998	Central Station	César	
2000	Villa-Lobos: A Life of Passion	Raul	
2001	Brainstorm	Mr. Wilson	
2001	Behind the Sun	Mr. Lourenço	
2010	Astral City: A Spiritual Journey	Anacleto, Governor of Nosso Lar	
2016	Os Experientes	Del Bello	
2023	The End	Padre Marcos	
2024	Nosso Lar 2: Os Mensageiros	Anacleto, Governor of Nosso Lar	
2027	Nosso Lar 3: Vida Eterna	Anacleto, Governor of Nosso Lar	
