= O Maior Brasileiro de Todos os Tempos =

- Genre: Documentary
- Directed by: Michael Ukstin
- Presented by: Carlos Nascimento
- Country of origin: Brazil
- Original language: Portuguese
- No. of seasons: 1
- No. of episodes: 12

Production
- Camera setup: Multi-camera
- Running time: 30-60 minutes

Original release
- Network: SBT
- Release: July 11 – October 3, 2012

Related
- 100 Greatest Britons

O Maior Brasileiro de Todos os Tempos (English: The Greatest Brazilian of All Time) is a public poll to rank the most outstanding Brazilian personalities. It was organized by the Brazilian broadcasting station SBT in 2012, and was hosted by Carlos Nascimento. Based on BBC's 100 Greatest Britons, it featured individual documentaries advocating the top ten candidates.

After three months of voting and more than a million votes recorded, the Brazilian public selected the one hundred persons who were placed in that poll.

The final episode aired on October 3, 2012. Chico Xavier was elected the greatest Brazilian of all time.

== List ==
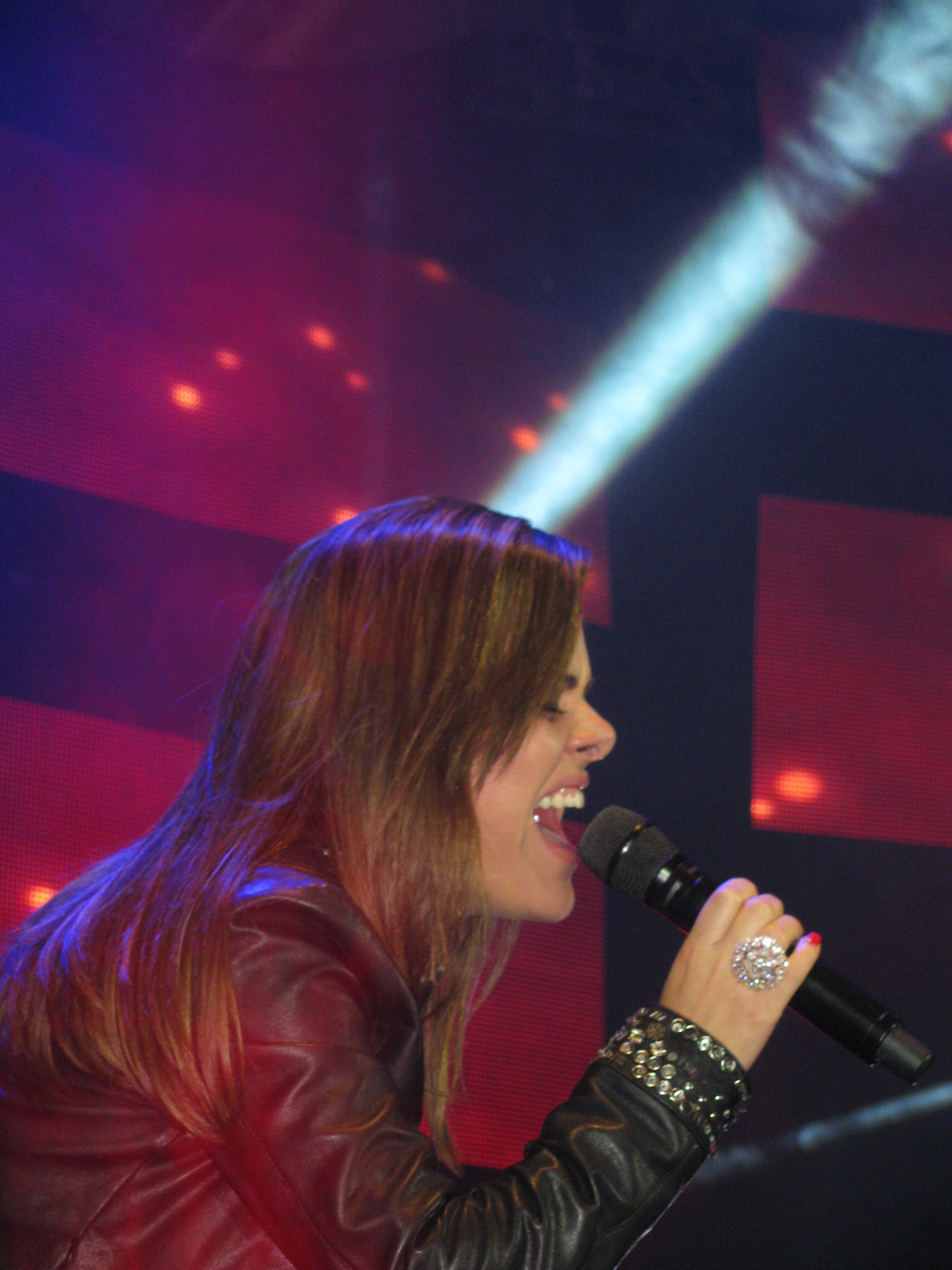
Ana Paula Valadão

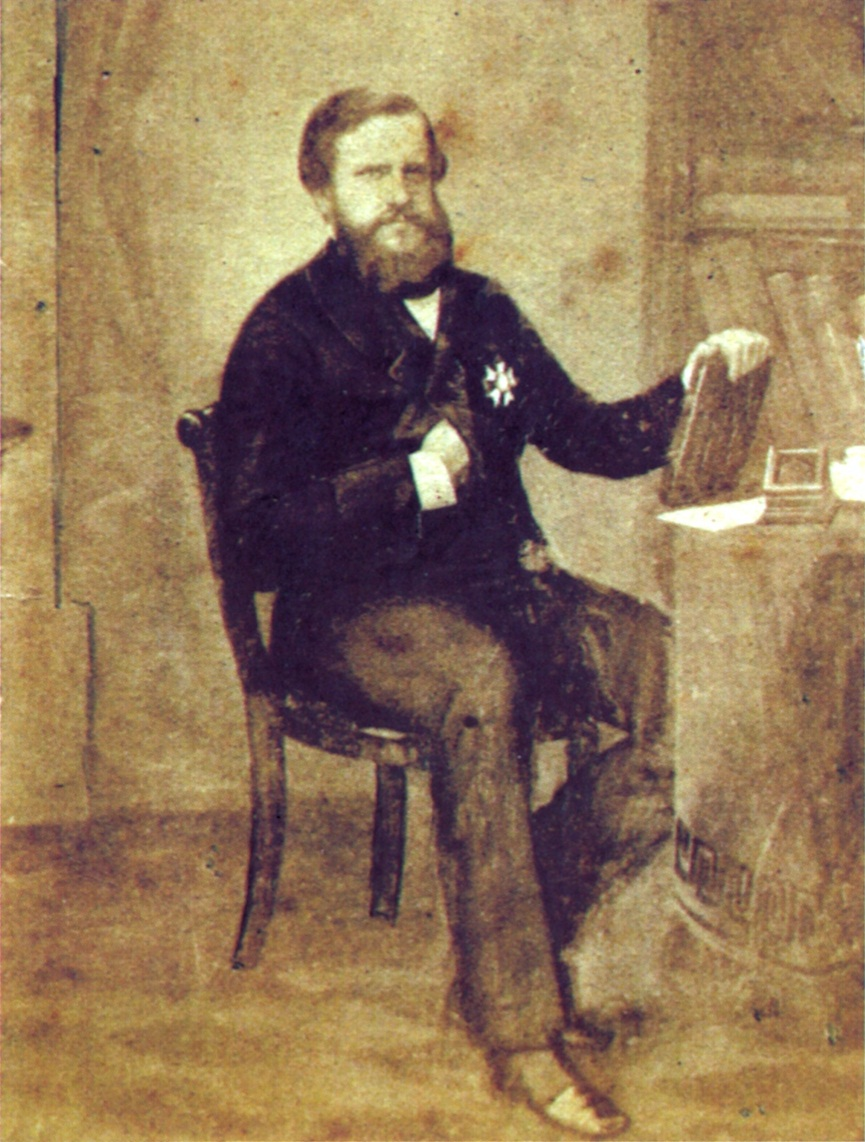
Pedro II of Brazil

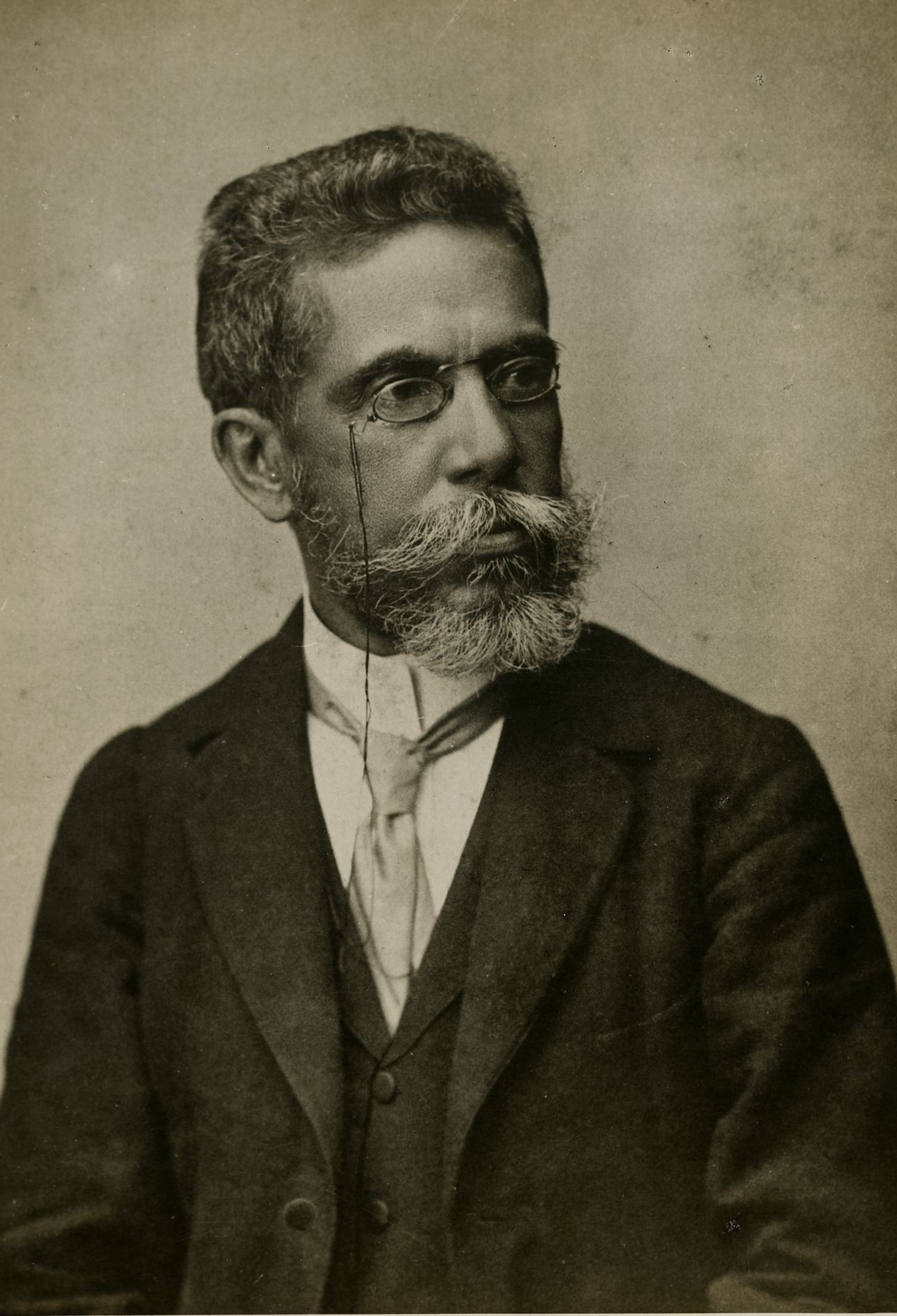
Machado de Assis

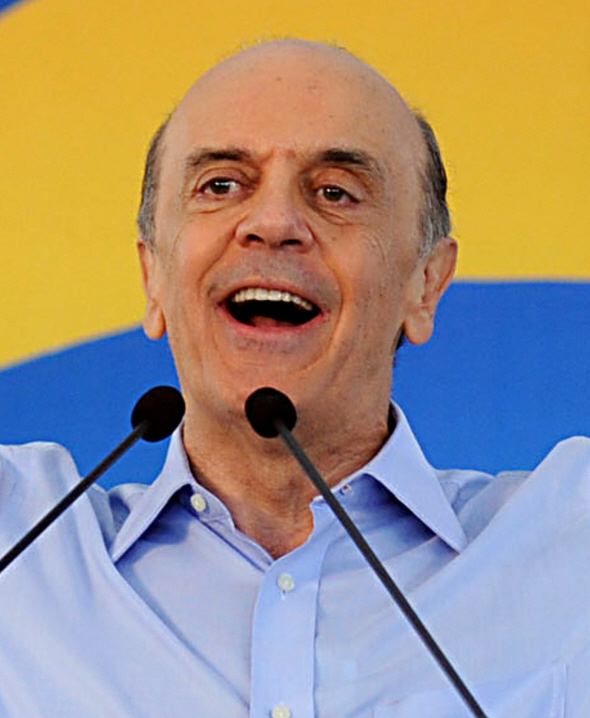
José Serra

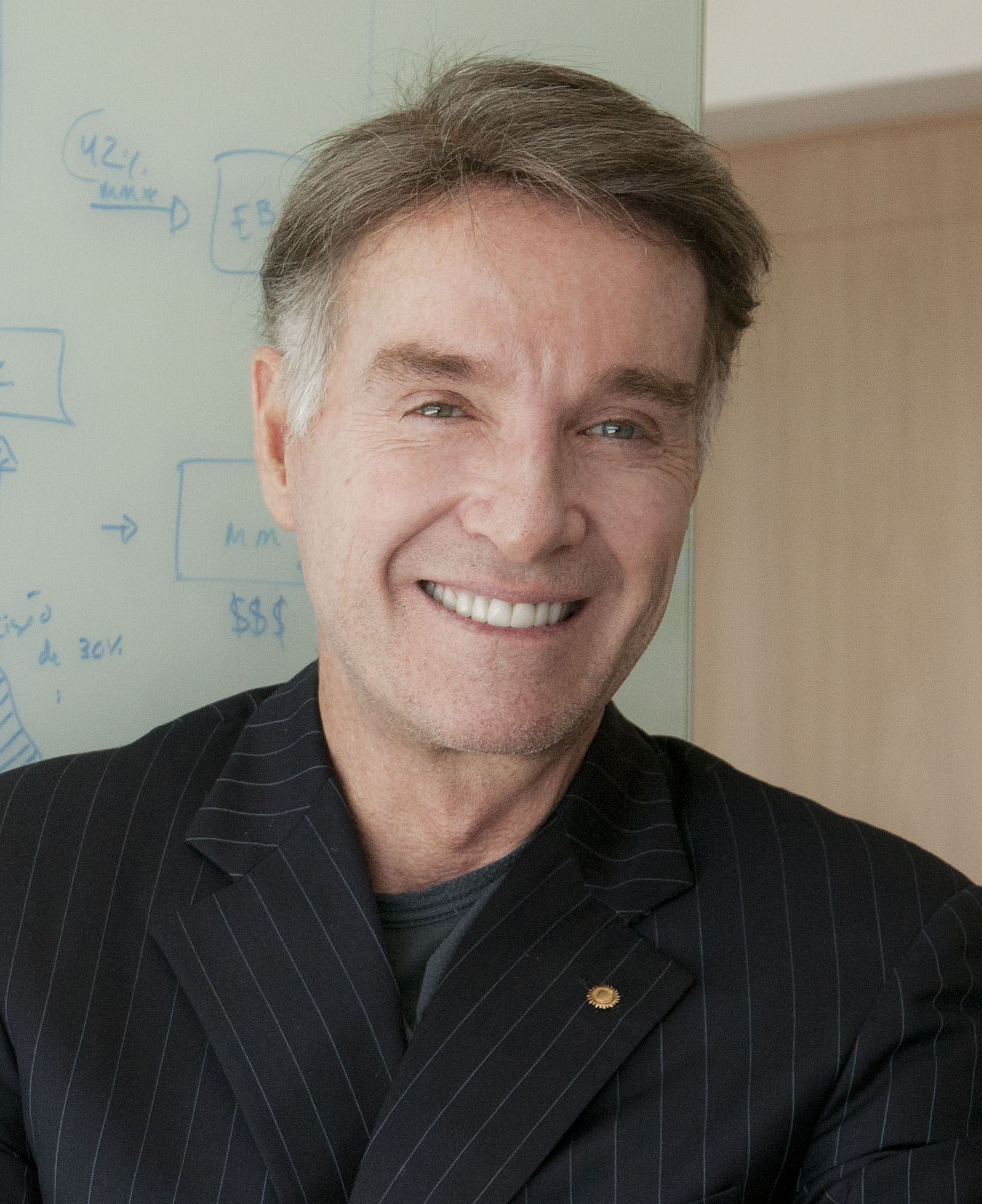
Eike Batista

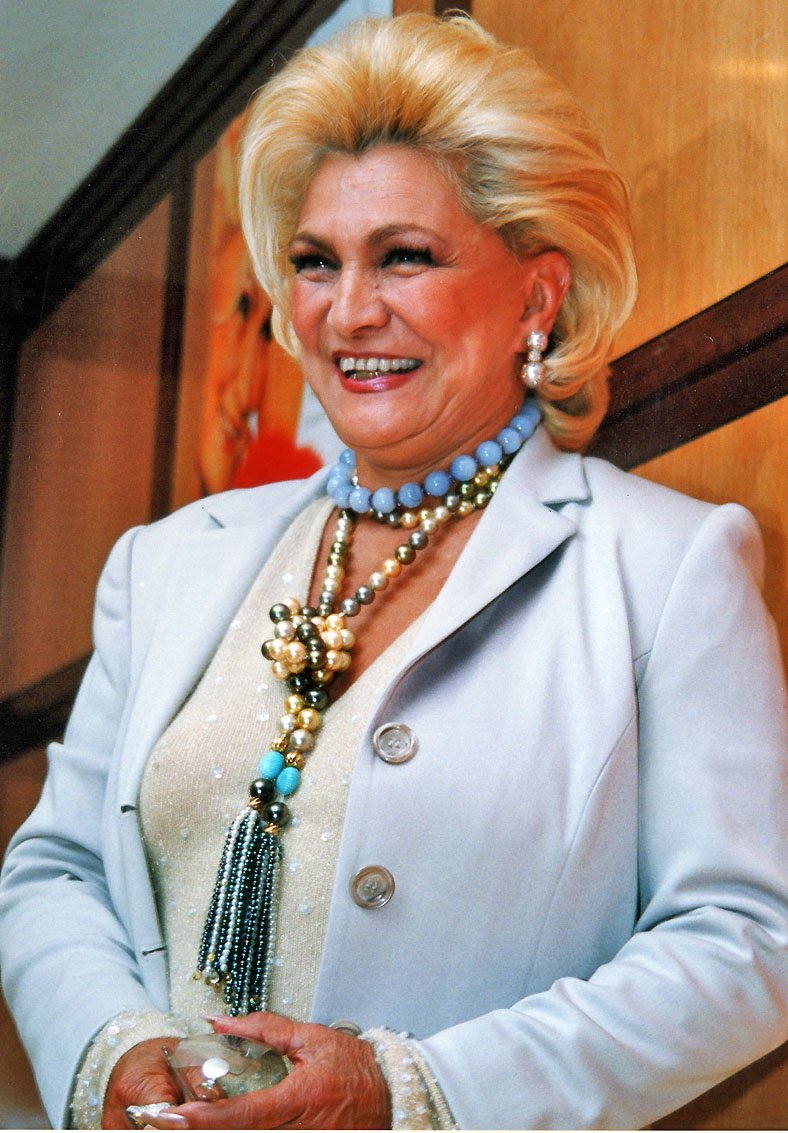
Hebe Camargo

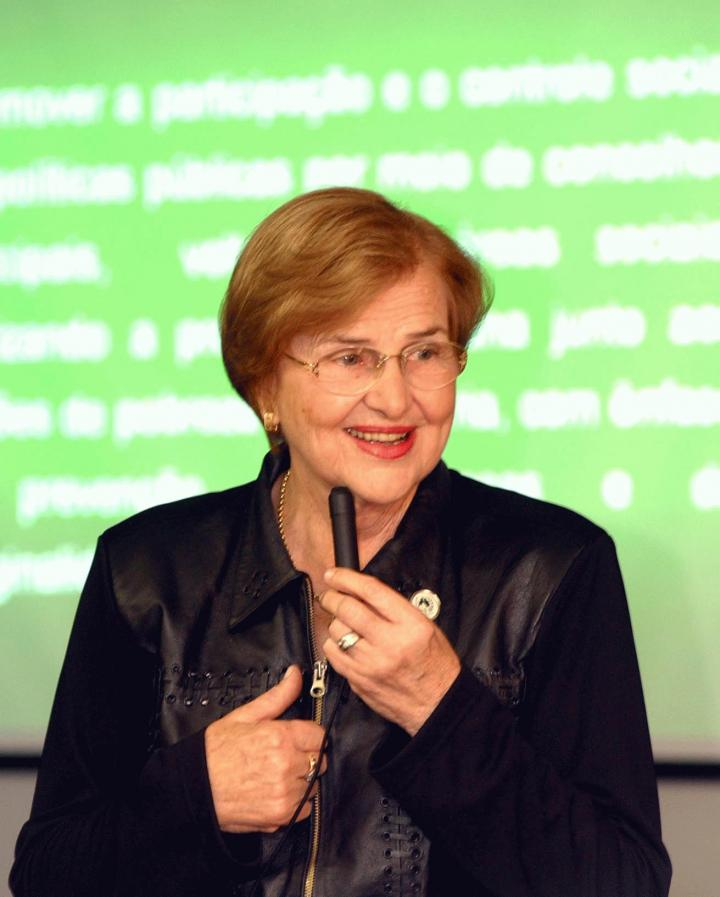
Zilda Arns

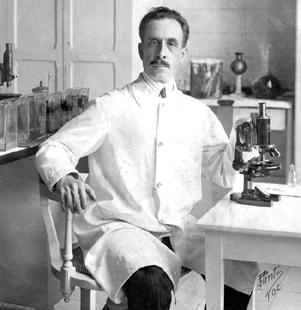
Carlos Chagas

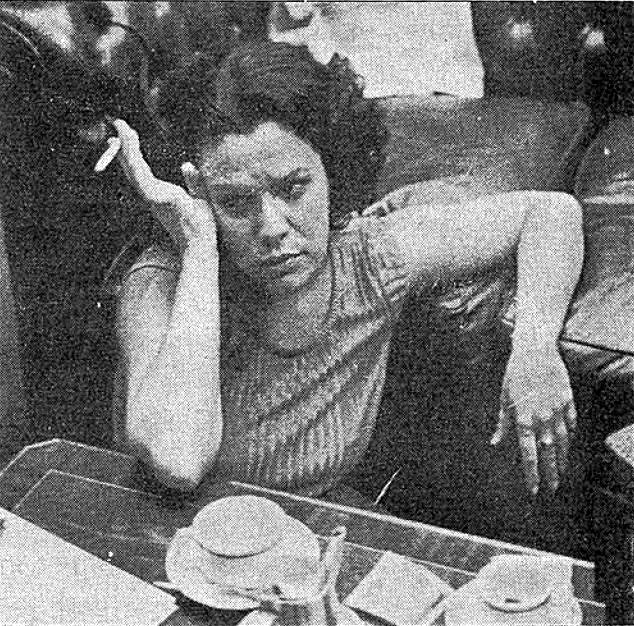
Elis Regina

Position	Name	Birth	Death	Occupation
100	Maria da Penha	1945		Housewife and pharmacist; women's rights activist (Lei Maria da Penha)
99	Jô Soares	1938	2022	TV presenter
98	Vital Brazil	1865	1950	Biomedical
97	Ana Paula Valadão	1976		Singer, evangelical pastor, writer and TV presenter
96	Roberto Justus	1955		Businessman and TV presenter
95	Itamar Franco	1930	2011	Ex-president of Brazil
94	Ronald Golias	1929	2005	Comedian
93	Jorge Amado	1912	2001	Writer
92	Romário Souza	1966		Football player and politician
91	Roberto Landell de Moura	1861	1928	Inventor
90	Anderson Silva	1975		Fighter
89	Tom Jobim	1927	1994	Singer-songwriter
88	Agenor Cazuza Neto	1958	1990	Singer-songwriter
87	William Bonner	1963		Journalist and TV anchor
86	Amado Batista	1951		Singer
85	Abelardo Barbosa	1917	1988	TV presenter
84	Chico Buarque	1944		Singer
83	Joelma Mendes	1974		Singer (vocalist of Banda Calypso)
82	Ronaldinho Gaúcho	1980		Football player
81	José Luiz Datena	1957		Writer, Journalist, TV Host
80	Dr. Sócrates Oliveira	1954	2011	Football player
79	José Serra	1942		Politician
78	Fernando Collor	1949		Ex-president of Brazil
77	Marcos Pontes	1963		Astronaut
76	Luís Carlos Prestes	1898	1990	Politician
75	Claudia Leitte	1980		Singer
74	Virgulino Lampião	1898	1938	Bandit
73	Manoel Garrincha	1933	1983	Football player
72	Michel Teló	1981		Singer
71	Lua Blanco	1987	2026	Actress and singer
70	Cândido Rondon	1865	1958	Military chief
69	Ermírio de Moraes	1928	2014	Businessman
68	Duque de Caxias	1803	1880	Military chief
67	Jonas Abib	1936	2022	Priest
66	Carlos Chagas	1878	1934	Doctor
65	Reynaldo Gianecchini	1972		Actor
64	Ulysses Guimarães	1916	1992	Politician
63	Anderson Dedé Vital	1988		Football player
62	Amácio Mazzaropi	1912	1981	Actor and filmmaker
61	Arthur Zico	1953		Football player
60	Priest Marcelo Rossi	1967		
59	Marcos Silveira	1973		Football player
58	Roberto Marinho	1904	2003	Journalist and businessman
57	Monteiro Lobato	1882	1948	Writer
56	Hebe Camargo	1929	2012	TV presenter and singer
55	Paulo Freire	1921	1997	Philosopher
54	RR Soares	1947		Evangelical Pastor and businessman
53	Zumbi dos Palmares	1655	1695	Popular hero
52	Carlos Drummond de Andrade	1902	1987	Poet and writer
51	José de Paiva Netto	1941		Religious Leader and writer
50	Rogério Ceni	1973		Professional goalkeeper
49	Gugu Liberato	1959	2019	TV presenter
48	Francisco Tiririca	1965		Entertainer and politician
47	Leonel Brizola	1922	2004	Politician
46	Raul Seixas	1945	1989	Singer-songwriter
45	Visconde de Mauá	1813	1889	Entrepreneur and banker
44	Elis Regina	1945	1982	Singer
43	Ivete Sangalo	1972		Singer
42	Luan Santana	1991		Singer
41	Machado de Assis	1839	1908	Writer
40	Xuxa	1963		Tv Host
39	Rodrigo Faro	1973		TV presenter, actor and singer
38	Renato Aragão	1936		Comedian
37	Dom Hélder Câmara	1909	1999	Priest
36	Valdemiro Santiago	1963		Evangelical pastor and businessman
35	Luciano Huck	1971		TV presenter
34	Tancredo Neves	1910	1985	Politician
33	Dilma Rousseff	1947		Ex-president of Brazil
32	Cícero Romão	1844	1934	Priest
31	Herbert de Souza	1935	1997	Sociologist
30	Renato Russo	1960	1996	Singer-songwriter and poet
29	Luiz Gonzaga	1912	1989	Singer
28	Chico Mendes	1944	1988	Activist
27	Dom Pedro II	1825	1891	2nd Emperor of Brazil
26	Silas Malafaia	1958		Evangelical pastor and businessman
25	Oswaldo Cruz	1872	1917	Scientist
24	Manuel Jacinto Coelho	1903	1991	Religious leader
23	Frei Galvão	1739	1822	Friar
22	Ruy Barbosa	1849	1923	Politician
21	Eike Batista	1956		Businessman
20	Neymar Jr.	1992		Football player
19	José Alencar	1931	2011	Politician
18	Roberto Carlos	1941		Singer-songwriter
17	Zilda Arns	1934	2010	Pediatrician and Humanitarian
16	Dercy Gonçalves	1907	2008	Actress and comedian
15	Ronaldo Nazário	1976		Football player
14	Chico Anysio	1931	2012	Actor and comedian
13	Edir Macedo	1945		Evangelical pastor and businessman

== Top 12 ==
The top twelve candidates were announced in alphabetical order. There was then a final elimination round by journalists and advocates, where the greatest Brazilian was chosen.

Top 12:

Name	Birth	Death	Occupation
Ayrton Senna	1960	1994	Race driver
Chico Xavier	1910	2002	Medium and Writer
Fernando Henrique Cardoso	1931	–	President and professor
Getúlio Vargas	1888	1954	President
Dulce de Souza Lopes Pontes	1914	1992	Saint
Juscelino Kubitschek	1902	1976	President and physician
Luiz Inácio Lula da Silva	1945	–	President and metalworker
Oscar Niemeyer	1907	2012	Architect
Edson Pelé	1940	2022	Football (soccer) player
Princess Isabel	1846	1921	Princess Imperial and regent
Santos Dumont	1873	1932	Aeronaut and inventor
Joaquim Tiradentes	1746	1792	Dentist and trooper

=== Elimination round ===
Name		VS	Name	
WON (51.0%)	Chico Xavier	x	Irmã Dulce	Lost (49.0%)
Lost (36.4%)	Luiz Inácio Lula da Silva	x	Ayrton Senna	WON (63.6%)
Lost (34.5%)	Joaquim Tiradentes	x	Santos Dumont	WON (65.5%)
WON (71.7%)	Juscelino Kubitschek	x	Edson Pelé	Lost (28.3%)
WON (64.2%)	Princess Isabel	x	Fernando Henrique Cardoso	Lost (35.8%)
Lost (40.7%)	Oscar Niemeyer	x	Getúlio Vargas	WON (59.3%)

=== Final ===
Name	VS	Name	VS	Name
Chico Xavier; The Greatest Brazilian of all time	x	Santos Dumont	x	Princess Isabel
WON (71.4%)	x		x	

== See also ==
- Greatest Britons spin-offs
