= Nosso Lar 2: Os Mensageiros =

2024 film directed by Wagner de Assis

- Portuguese: Nosso Lar 2: Os Mensageiros
- Directed by: Wagner de Assis
- Written by: Wagner de Assis
- Based on: The Messengers by Chico Xavier
- Produced by: Iafa Britz
- Starring: Renato Prieto; Edson Celulari; Mouhamed Harfouch; Vanessa Gerbelli; Fernanda Rodrigues; Fábio Lago; Felipe de Carolis; Othon Bastos
- Production companies: Cinética Filmes; Star Original Productions
- Distributed by: Walt Disney Studios Motion Pictures (via Star Distribution)
- Release date: January 25, 2024
- Country: Brazil
- Language: Portuguese

Nosso Lar 2: Os Mensageiros, commonly known as Nosso Lar 2, is a 2024 Brazilian drama film, written and directed by Wagner de Assis, was released on January 25, 2024. The screenplay was based on the novel The Messengers (1944), psychographed by the spiritist medium Chico Xavier, under the influence of the spirit of André Luiz.

The sequel to the 2010 movie Astral City: A Spiritual Journey, Nosso Lar 2: Os Mensageiros tells the story of a group of workers from Nosso Lar, better known as "The Messengers", who comes to Earth on a rescue mission to assist people who are about to fail in their lives, forgetting the planning they made, and heading their destinies towards great suffering.

The film stars actor Renato Prieto in the role of the main character, André Luiz, and features Edson Celulari, Mouhamed Harfouch, Vanessa Gerbelli, Fernanda Rodrigues, Fábio Lago, Felipe de Carolis, and a guest appearance by Othon Bastos.

== Plot ==
André Luiz (Renato Prieto) joins a group of messenger spirits led by Aniceto (Edson Celulari), who sets out for Earth to follow the unfolding of a mission that is in danger of failing: the creation of a spiritual work that connects the two worlds. In the process, they also face their own dramas. Together, they dedicate themselves to taking care of three protégés whose stories are intertwined: Otávio (Felipe de Carolis), a young medium who did not fulfill the plan in his mission; Isidoro (Mouhamed Harfouch), leader of a spiritist house; and Fernando (Rafael Sieg), entrepreneur responsible for financing the project.

== Cast ==
- Renato Prieto .... André Luiz
- Edson Celulari ... Aniceto
- Felipe de Carolis ... Otávio
- Mouhamed Harfouch ... Isidoro
- Rafael Sieg ... Fernando
- Othon Bastos ... Anacleto, Governor of Nosso Lar
- Fábio Lago
- Vanessa Gerbelli
- Fernanda Rodrigues
- Nando Brandão
- Ju Trevisol

== Production ==
On August 7, 2015, the Brazilian Spiritist Federation (FEB) first announced the sequel to the highly successful film Astral City: A Spiritual Journey (2010), entitled Nosso Lar 2: Os Mensageiros, and that, just like the first movie, it would be directed by Wagner de Assis. In 2017, the film entered pre-production phase, raising funds for its production. On August 24, 2018, FEB reported that the film was scheduled to be released in early 2019.

On April 18, 2022, it was revealed that actor Edson Celulari would join the production, and the cast met in Rio de Janeiro for a workshop on Spiritism, the Brazilian Spiritist Federation, Chico Xavier, and André Luiz, with focus on the book The Messengers (1944). On the same day, it was announced that filming would begin the following week in the city of Rio de Janeiro, and that the movie would premiere on January 25, 2024.
