= LGW =

LGW may refer to:

- London Gatwick Airport (IATA code), an airport in West Sussex, England
- Luftfahrtgesellschaft Walter (ICAO code), a German regional airline
- Langwathby railway station (station code), England
- Laser-guided weapon or laser-guided bomb
- Legion of Good Will, a Brazilian charitable, non-profit organization
