= LBV =

LBV may refer to:

- Late bottled vintage, a type of Port wine
- Luminous blue variable, a very bright, blue, hypergiant variable star
- Libreville International Airport (IATA: LBV), in Libreville, Gabon
- Line-break valve, a kind of valve in industry which closes automatically in occurrence of sudden pressure drop between its upstream and downstream
- Load-bearing vest
- Legion of Good Will, a Brazilian organization abbreviated as LBV (Legião da Boa Vontade)
- A World War 2 type craft; see Type B ship § Landing Barge, Vehicle
- A clothing brand founded by Joss Sackler
