= Bezerra de Menezes: O Diário de um Espírito =

2008 film directed by Joe Pimentel, Glauber Filho

- Theatrical poster
- Directed by: Glauber Filho; Joe Pimentel
- Written by: Andréa Bardawill; Luciano Klein
- Starring: Carlos Vereza; Magno Carvalho; Larissa Vereza; Lucas Ribeiro; Cláudio Raposo
- Production company: Triofilmes
- Distributed by: 20th Century Fox
- Release date: 29 August 2008
- Running time: 75 minutes
- Country: Brazil
- Language: Portuguese
- Budget: R$2.7 million ($1,220,337)
- Box office: R$3,534,245 ($1 597 397)

Bezerra de Menezes: O Diário de um Espírito (lit: Bezerra de Menezes: The Diary of a Spirit) is a 2008 biography drama film directed by Glauber Filho and Joe Pimentel about the Brazilian medium Bezerra de Menezes. It was shot in Fortaleza, Guaramiranga, Maranguape, and Jaguaruana, all cities in Ceará, as well as in Recife and Rio de Janeiro.

== Plot ==
The 18-year-old Bezerra de Menezes (Magno Carvalho) begins his studies of medicine in Rio de Janeiro, then the capital of Brazil. An abolitionist, Bezerra entered politics and was several times elected alderman and congressman. However, it was his work with the most humble people that brought him fame, becoming known as the doctor of the poor.

== Cast ==
- Carlos Vereza as Bezerra de Menezes
- Magno Carvalho as Bezerra de Menezes (young)
- Lucas Ribeiro as Bezerra de Menezes (child)
- Cláudio Raposo as Antônio Adolfo Bezerra de Menezes
- Juliana Carvalho as Dona Fabiana
- Mirelle Freitas as Maria Cândida
- Alexandra Marinho as Cândida Augusta
- Ana Rosa as Bezerra de Menezes' sister
- Everaldo Pontes as Soares
- Larissa Vereza as Sister-in-law of Bezerra de Menezes
- Lúcio Mauro as Leader of the spiritist Center
- Pedro Domingues as Mr Materialistic
- B. de Paiva as Dr. Leopoldino
- Taís Dahas as Hermínia
- Romário Fernandes as The student
