= Spiritualism =

Spiritualism may refer to:

- Spiritualism (beliefs), a metaphysical belief that the world is made up of at least two fundamental substances, matter and spirit
- Spiritualism (movement), a 19th- and 20th-century religious movement, according to which an individual's awareness persists after death and may be contacted by the living
  - Spiritual church movement, a group of Spiritualist churches and denominations historically based in the African-American community
- Spiritualism (philosophy), the concept that there is an immaterial reality that cannot be perceived by the senses

== See also ==
- Spiritism (disambiguation)
- Spiritualist church, a church affiliated with the spiritualist movement
- Spirituality, a religious process of re-formation that "aims to recover the original shape of man"
