= Pinga-Fogo =

Brazilian debate program

Pinga-Fogo (lit. 'Dripping Fire') was a Brazilian debate program produced by TV Tupi São Paulo and aired nationwide by Rede Tupi. In 1971, the program was broadcast live on four of its stations, while being shown on a tape delay on the rest of the network, with TV Tupi Rio de Janeiro airing it on a two-week delay.

== History ==
=== Early years ===
Pinga-Fogo was created in 1963 (one year before the implementation of the military dictatorship) as a political debate program, becoming famous due to the topics covered. Running until 1967 in this format, a number of noteworthy politicians made it to the Sumaré studios: Carlos Lacerda, Miguel Arrais, Milton Campos, Luis Carlos Prestes and Folha de S. Paulo's owner Júlio de Mesquita Filho.

=== Censorship problems and the interview with Chico Xavier ===
The effects of Institutional Act Number Five led to the reformat of the program and the cut in the number of political guests. With the political prohibition, the program started to cater other topics.

The program reached an unexpected record when, on July 28, 1971, the program invited medium Chico Xavier. The unexpected success of the interview (which had reported an audience share of 75%) caused the production to invite him again, on December 20, 1971. His second interview included topics from religious and journalist guests, covering reincarnation, sex, Catholicism, abortion, ectogenesis and homosexuality. The second interview was seen as more lively than the "monotonous" July edition.

=== Later years ===
In October 1978, the 23 Tupi stations announced the return of Pinga-Fogo, however, a Jornal do Brasil writer thought that the revival had no relation with the "authentic" version. The key difference between the two versions was that it had censorship issues, something the original version did not. Only Almir Guimarães survived from the original version. TV Borborema, its affiliate in Campina Grande, made a program using a similar formula in 1979, Confidencial.

The November 6, 1979 edition, featuring Afonso Celso Pastore, was prohibited to viewers under 18.
