= Intelligent Creatures =

- Intelligent Creatures
- Industry: CGI Visual Effects
- Founded: 2001
- Headquarters: Toronto, Ontario, Canada
- Products: Visual Effects
- Website: http://www.intelligentcreatures.com

Intelligent Creatures (IC) is a motion picture visual effects company located in Toronto, Ontario, Canada.

== History ==
IC was founded on March 30, 2001 by current CEO Lon Molnar, a graduate of the Vancouver Film School, Michael Hatton, Raymond Gieringer, and Wendy Lanning, and commenced production in 2002. The company was created in response to the demands of the visual effects industry, at a time when there was a shortage of visual effects vendors in Toronto.

== Location ==
IC's studio is located in the east end of Toronto, in close proximity to Pinewood Toronto Studios and Cinespace Film Studios. A satellite office is located in North Bay, Ontario.

== Projects ==
IC has worked with film studios such as Warner Bros., Walt Disney Pictures, Columbia Pictures, New Line Cinema, Paramount, and 20th Century Studios.

The company has worked on films such as Zack Snyder's Watchmen (for which it designed Dave Gibbon's character Rorschach), Darren Aronofsky's The Fountain, and Alejandro González Iñárritu's Babel, Stranger than Fiction, Battle: Los Angeles, and Mr. & Mrs. Smith. Titles currently in production include Omega, Orphan Black, Transporter: The Series and The Last Druid: Garm Wars.

IC has received a nomination for Best Visual Effects in a Broadcast Program from the Visual Effects Society for its work on Secret Universe: Journey Inside the Cell / Battlefield Cell (one part of the Discovery Channel's Curiosity).

== IC Filmography ==
Year	Projects
2016	London Has Fallen; The Witch; Colossal
2015	Remember; Hyena Road
2012	Transporter: The Series; Secret Universe: Journey Inside The Cell
2011	Battle: Los Angeles; Breakaway; Alphas
2010	Nosso Lar; Piranha 3D; The Bang Bang Club; Snowmen
2009	Everybody's Fine; Watchmen; Underworld: Rise of the Lycans; Hotel for Dogs; The Day of the Triffids (TV)
2008	Traitor
2007	Mr. Magorium's Wonder Emporium; The Game Plan; The Hunting Party; Hairspray; The Number 23
2006	Stranger than Fiction; The Fountain; Babel; Grindhouse; The Woods; Silent Hill; The Sentinel; The Adventures of Sharkboy and Lavagirl in 3-D
2005	Stay; Slow Burn; The Man; Romance & Cigarettes; Mr. & Mrs. Smith; The Matador
2004	Resident Evil: Apocalypse; Dirty Dancing: Havana Nights; Confessions of a Teenage Drama Queen
