= Humberto de Campos (journalist) =

Brazilian journalist (1886–1934)

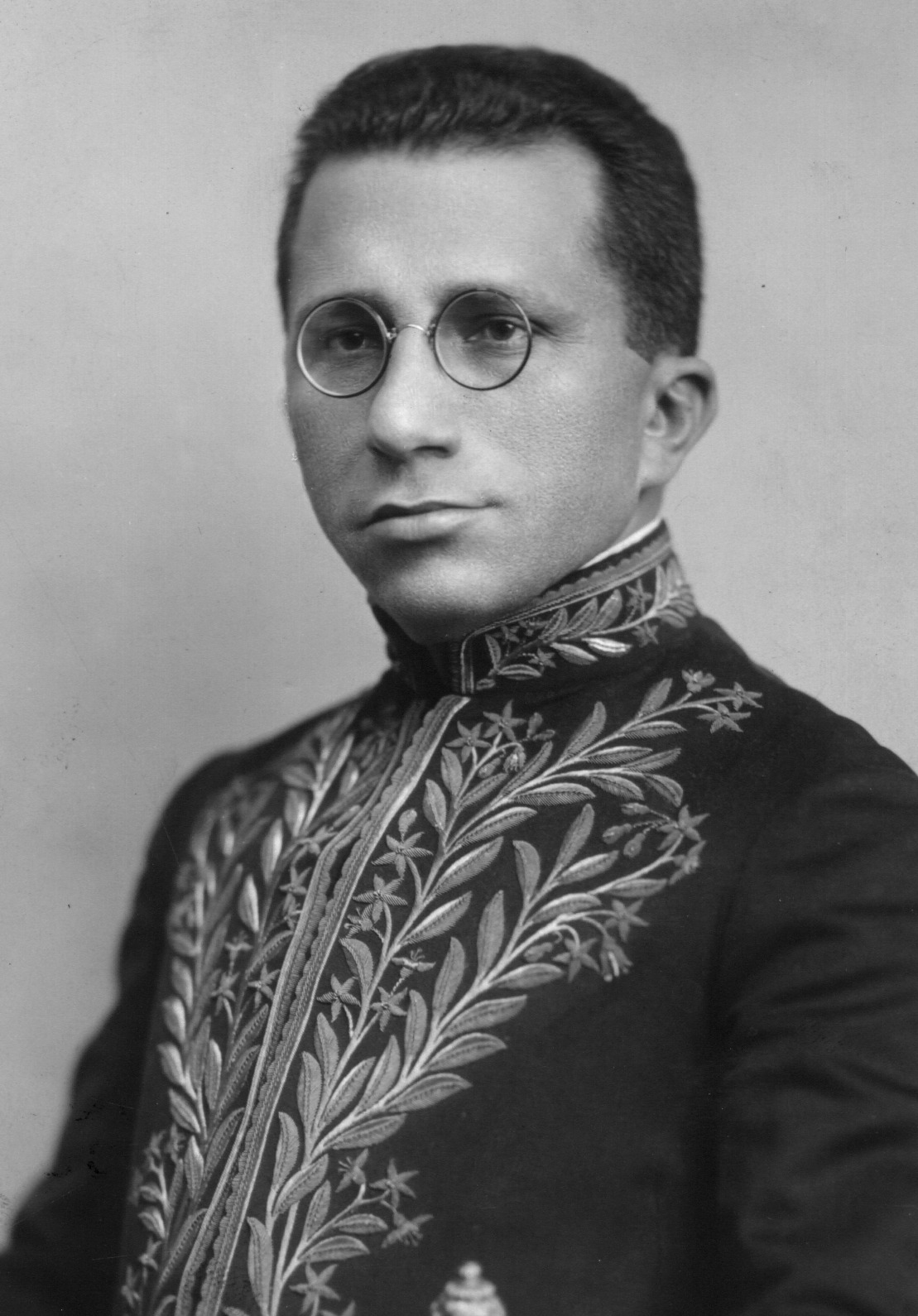
- Born: October 25, 1886; Miritiba
- Died: December 5, 1934 (aged 48); Rio de Janeiro
- Occupations: journalist; politician; writer

Humberto de Campos Veras (Miritiba, October 25, 1886 – Rio de Janeiro, December 5, 1934) was a Brazilian journalist, politician and writer.

== Biography ==
He was the son of Joaquim Gomes de Farias Veras and Ana de Campos Veras of modest origins. He was born in what was then the municipality of Miritiba in Maranhão and which is today named after him. After the death of his father, at age six, he moved to São Luís where he started to work in a local business to support his family. At age 17 he moved again, this time to Pará, where he started his journalistic activity at the Folha do Norte and A Província do Pará.

He published his first book of verses, titled "Poeira" (1st series) in 1910, when he was 24 years old, which earned him some recognition. Two years later he moved to Rio de Janeiro, where he continued his journalistic career and became known in the literary circles of the federal capital, attracting the friendship of writers such as Coelho Neto, Emílio de Menezes and Olavo Bilac. He starts to work at the newspaper "O Imparcial", next to illustrious figures such as Rui Barbosa, José Veríssimo, Vicente de Carvalho and João Ribeiro. He becomes more and more known nationally for his chronicles published in various newspapers in Rio de Janeiro, São Paulo and other Brazilian capitals, sometimes under his pseudonym "Conselheiro XX".

In 1919 he enters the Academia Brasileira de Letras, succeeding Emílio de Menezes in chair number 20. One year later he enters politics, elected as federal deputy in his home state, and keeping his mandate active until the sudden arrival of the Revolution of 1930. After going through a period of financial difficulties and owing to the admiration of high-ranking members of the provisional government he is first appointed educational inspector in Rio de Janeiro and later director of the Fundação Casa de Rui Barbosa.

In 1933, with his health already deteriorating, Humberto de Campos publishes Memórias (1886–1900), in which he describes his childhood and youth. The work is an immediate success with public and critics alike and accompanied by further editions in the following decades. A second part of the work written by Humberto de Campos just before his death came only to light posthumously under the title of Memórias Inacabadas (Unfinished Memoirs).

After several years of illness, causing the almost complete loss of his eyesight and serious problems in the urinal tract, Humberto de Campos dies in Rio de Janeiro, on December 5, 1934, at age 48, as a result of a complication of a chirurgical surgery.

Given that Humberto de Campos died at the height of his popularity, many of his chronicles, anecdotes, stories and recollections were published in the years following his death. At that time several books were supposedly written by his ghost through the automatic writing of a medium, Chico Xavier. Family members of Humberto de Campos sued, citing the lack of payments for authors' rights. The demand, which caused a great polemic at the time, was deemed groundless.

Then in 1950, a new controversy: the secret diary kept periodically by the author in the 1910s and more regularly from 1928 until his death is first published in the magazine “O Cruzeiro” and then as a book in 1954 by the same editors. The publication caused a scandal at the time because of personal observations made by Humberto de Campos about famous figures in literature, politics and society, amongst others Machado de Assis, Getúlio Vargas and Olavo Bilac.

Further editions of the complete works of Humberto de Campos were released by various publishers (José Olympio, Mérito, W. M. Jackson, Opus) until 1983.

The constant financial worries, which required him to publish daily chronicles, stories and literary reviews to sustain himself, as well as his ongoing health problems resulting in a premature death, hindered Humberto de Campos from dedicating himself to bigger literary projects. This is the reason why a substantial part of his bibliography is made up of collections of his writings, which represent a useful instrument to analyze the daily and literary life of the 1910s, 1920s and 1930s in Brazil. The temporality which characterizes a major part of his writing seem to be the main reason why there is currently little interest from readers and academics.

== Academia Brasileira de Letras ==
Elected as third occupant to chair number 20 of the Academia Brasileira de Letras, the seat of Patron Joaquim Manuel de Macedo. He was awarded the position on May 8, 1920, by Luís Murat.

== Works ==
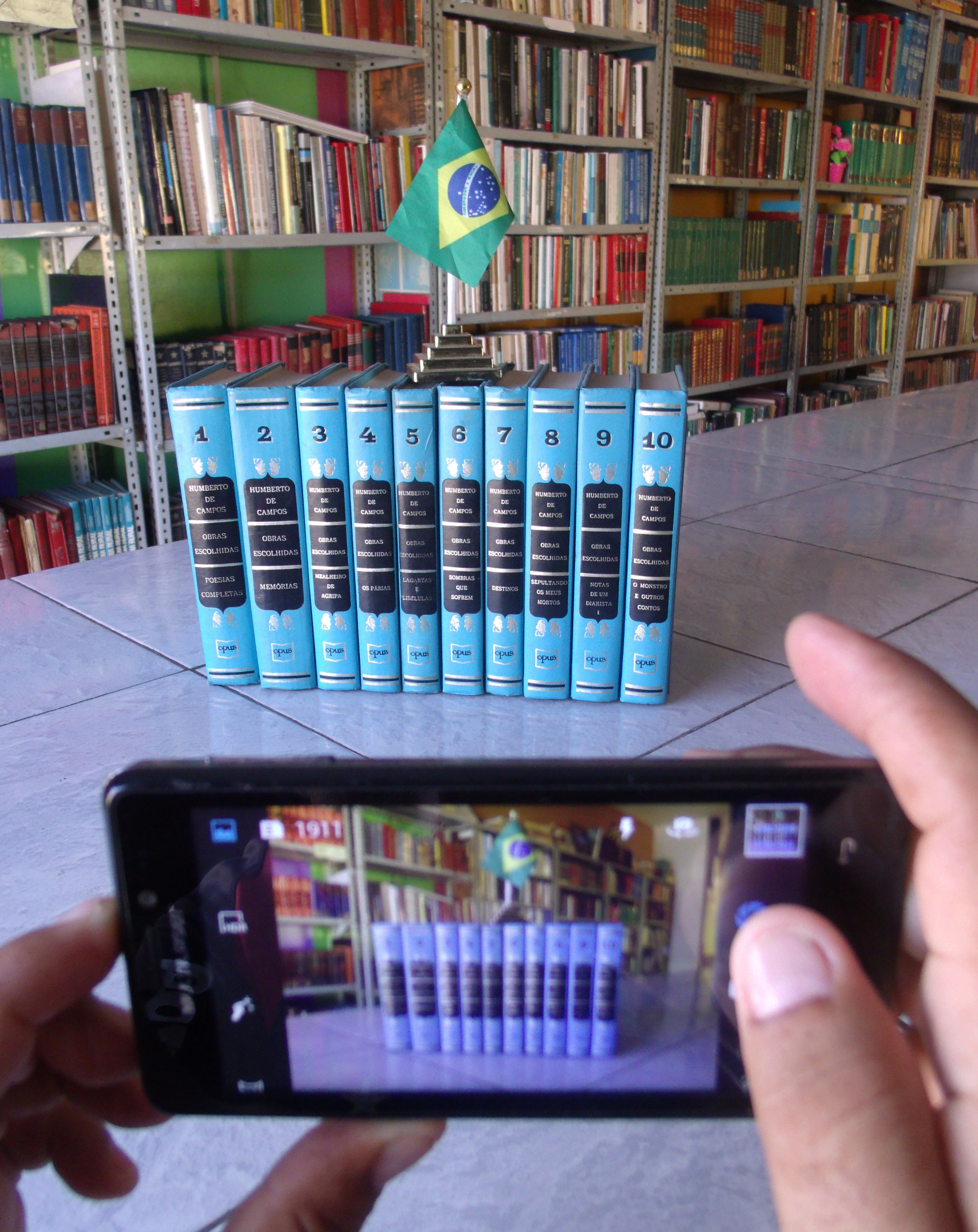
A collection of works by Humberto de Campos in a municipal library.

Apart from Conselheiro XX, Campos also used the pseudonyms Almirante Justino Ribas, Luís Phoca, João Caetano, Giovani Morelli, Batu-Allah, Micromegas e Hélios. Humberto de Campos left a secret diary, published posthumously as a book and partially reproduced in some editions of O Cruzeiro. The author's scathing reviews and commentaries about his contemporaries caused an enormous controversy.
