= Adolfo Bezerra de Menezes =

Brazilian doctor, politician, military officer, and Spiritist

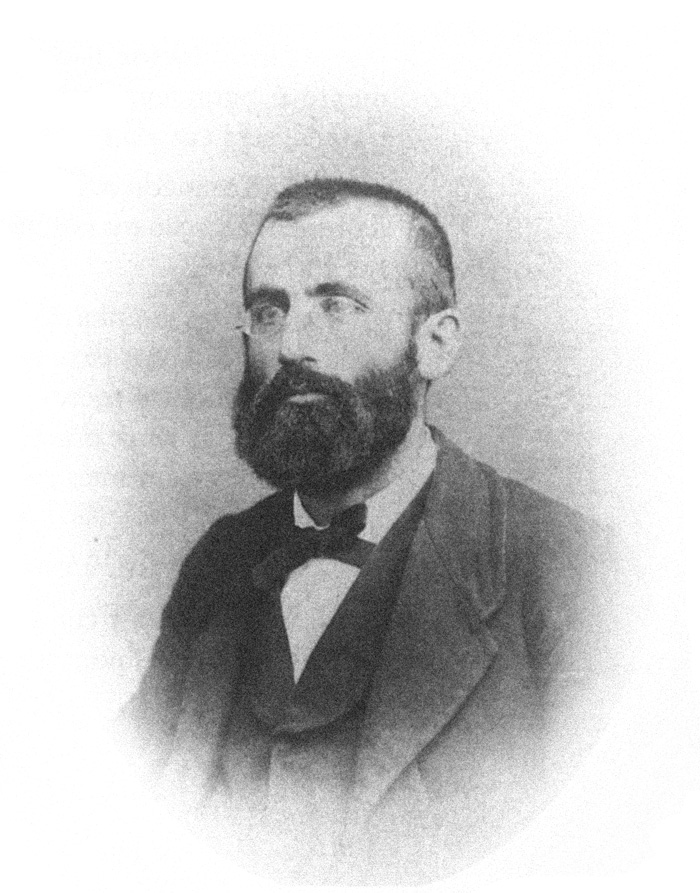

Councillor of Rio de Janeiro
- In office 1861–1868

Personal details
- Born: August 29, 1831 Jaguaretama, Ceará, Brazil
- Died: April 11, 1900 (aged 68) Rio de Janeiro, Brazil
- Education: Federal University of Rio de Janeiro
- Occupation: Doctor, military, writer, journalist, politician
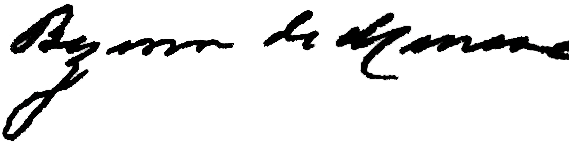
- Signature

Military service
- Branch/service: Imperial Brazilian Army
- Years of service: 1856–1861
- Rank: Surgeon-lieutenant
- Commands: Health Corps

Adolfo Bezerra de Menezes Cavalcanti (August 29, 1831 – April 11, 1900) was a Brazilian doctor, politician, military officer, and influential figure in the early Spiritist movement in Brazil. He is often referred to as the "Kardec of Brazil" due to his significant contributions to the dissemination and establishment of Spiritism in the country.

== Biography ==
=== Early life and education ===
Adolfo Bezerra de Menezes Cavalcanti was born in the small town of Riacho do Sangue (now Jaguaretama), in the province of Ceará, Brazil. He was the son of Antônio Bezerra de Menezes and Fabiana de Jesus Maria Bezerra. Despite being born into a family with modest means, Bezerra de Menezes showed early intellectual promise. At the age of 12, he was sent to the city of Fortaleza to study, where he excelled in his studies and later pursued a medical degree at the Faculty of Medicine in Rio de Janeiro. He graduated as a physician in 1856.

=== Medical career ===
Bezerra de Menezes quickly gained a reputation as a compassionate and dedicated doctor, especially known for treating the poor and those who could not afford medical care. His empathy and commitment to helping those in need earned him the nickname "Doctor of the Poor." Throughout his medical career, he continued to provide free consultations and medications to those in need, which further solidified his status as a beloved figure in Brazilian society.

=== Political career ===
In addition to his work as a physician, Bezerra de Menezes was also involved in politics. As a member of the Liberal Party, he was elected as a city councilor in Rio de Janeiro and later served as a member of the General Assembly of Brazil. His political career was marked by his advocacy for social justice and the welfare of the less fortunate. He was known for his integrity and for using his political influence to benefit the most vulnerable members of society.

In 1869, he published an abolitionist essay A escravidão no Brasil e as medidas que convém tomar para extingui-la sem dano para a Nação ('Slavery in Brazil and the measures that should be taken to extinguish it without harm to the Nation'), where he not only defended freedom for slaves, but also their insertion and adaptation into society through education. The work was distributed free of charge to the population.

=== Conversion to Spiritism ===
Bezerra de Menezes was introduced to Spiritism in the late 19th century, during a time when the teachings of Allan Kardec were gaining popularity in Brazil. Initially skeptical, he gradually became convinced of the validity of Spiritist principles after in-depth study and personal experiences. His conversion to Spiritism marked a turning point in his life.

In 1886, Bezerra de Menezes publicly declared his adherence to Spiritism, a decision that had a significant impact on his career and personal life. He became a prominent figure in the Brazilian Spiritist movement, using his medical and political influence to promote Spiritist ideas. He served as the president of the Brazilian Spiritist Federation (FEB) from 1895 until his death in 1900. Under his leadership, the organization grew significantly and played a crucial role in spreading Spiritism throughout Brazil.

== Contributions to Spiritism ==
Bezerra de Menezes wrote extensively on Spiritist philosophy, medicine, and the intersection of science and spirituality. His works, including books, articles, and public lectures, helped to popularize Spiritism in Brazil and solidify its place as a major spiritual movement in the country. He is credited with bringing a more compassionate and socially engaged approach to Spiritism, emphasizing the importance of charity, moral development, and social responsibility.

His most famous works include A Loucura Sob Novo Prisma ('Madness Under a New Prism'), where he explores the Spiritist view on mental illness, and A Casa Assombrada ('The Haunted House'), a novel with Spiritist themes. His writings and teachings continue to be influential in the Spiritist community.

== See also ==
- Bezerra de Menezes: O Diário de um Espírito
