= Astral City: A Spiritual Journey =

2010 Brazilian film directed by Wagner de Assis

- US DVD Poster
- Directed by: Wagner de Assis
- Written by: Wagner de Assis
- Produced by: Iafa Britz
- Starring: Renato Prieto; Fernando Alves Pinto
- Cinematography: Ueli Steiger
- Edited by: Marcelo Moraes
- Music by: Philip Glass
- Distributed by: 20th Century Fox
- Release date: September 3, 2010
- Running time: 105 minutes
- Country: Brazil
- Language: Portuguese
- Budget: $10,000,000
- Box office: $25,000,000

Astral City: A Spiritual Journey (Portuguese: Nosso Lar) is a 2010 Brazilian drama film directed by Wagner de Assis, starring Renato Prieto. It is based on the book of the same name by the medium Francisco Cândido Xavier, and features a soundtrack composed by Philip Glass.

Distributed by 20th Century Fox, the film also features well-known actors and actresses from Brazilian telenovelas such as Othon Bastos, Ana Rosa and Paulo Goulart, among others. It was shot on location in Rio de Janeiro and Brasília, during the months of July, August and September 2009, with its post-production taking 9 months to be completed. It was released on September 3, 2010, in Brazil to great critical acclaim and more than one million viewers in its opening weekend. In 2015, the Brazilian Spiritualist Federation (FEB) first announced the sequel to Astral City: A Spiritual Journey, entitled Nosso Lar 2: Os Mensageiros, was released on January 25, 2024.

== Plot ==
When André Luiz, a selfish prominent physician and father of three, dies, instead of rising to what he believed would be heaven, he awakens in a valley of devastation. Living as a castaway, he, as well as the other spirits around him, is deemed to have been a suicide, and it is beyond him why he has had such a fate.

One day, a beam of light comes down from the sky bringing rescue to spirits in deep troughs of the Valley. André is rescued and lifted to a spiritual city named Nosso Lar (Our Home). There, he makes new friends and alliances but also meets his enemy – himself. He has betrayed his own existence by his self-destructive actions during his life on Earth, and, in order to prove he still truly values life, he must gain merits in the eyes of the city's Ministries through humbling hard work.

Finally, his greatest wish since arriving in the city comes true: he is granted permission to descend to Earth and see his wife and kids. Ten years have passed, his wife has remarried and his children have grown up. In this awakening moment, André has to put into play what he has learned back in Nosso Lar. He must accept his own death and step into another level of existence, learning to love and be loved, and that life never ceases.

== Cast ==
- Renato Prieto as André Luiz
  - Gabriel Azevedo as 20-year-old André Luiz
  - Gabriel Scheer as 10-year-old André Luiz
- Fernando Alves Pinto as Lísias
- Rosanne Mulholland as Eloísa
- Inez Vianna as Narcisa
- Rodrigo dos Santos as Tobias
- Werner Schünemann as Emmanuel
- Clemente Viscaíno as Minister Clarêncio
- Ana Rosa as Laura, Lísias' mother
- Othon Bastos as Anacleto, Governor of Nosso Lar
- Paulo Goulart as Minister Genésio
- Helena Varvaki as Zélia
- Aracy Cardoso as Dona Amélia, André Luiz's patient
- Selma Egrei as Luísa, André Luiz's mother
- Nicola Siri as Ernesto, Zélia's current husband
- Lisa Fávero as Clarice, André Luiz's daughter
  - Jeniffer Oliveira as 10-year-old Clarice
- Amélia Bittencourt as Judite, Lísias' aunt
- César Cardadeiro as Mariano, André Luiz's son
  - Pedro Lucas Lopes as 10-year-old Mariano
- Chica Xavier as Ismália, André Luiz's maid
  - Cristina Xavier as 35-year-old Ismália

== Production ==
=== Background ===
The film is an adaptation of the 1944 book of the same name, said to be dictated by the spirit André Luiz and psychographed by Chico Xavier, Brazil's best-known and respected medium, having channeled more than 400 books. The book is considered a great classic of spiritist literature. Engaging the reader from a first-person narrative, André Luiz delivers his impressions of the spirit world he encounters after his death.

Detailed drawings of the city "Our Home" as well as the architecture of the buildings, ministries and homes, were created by the medium Heigorina Cunha through her observations made during her alleged travels outside of the body in March 1979, led and guided by the spirit Lucius. These drawings served as inspiration to create the visual architecture of the city depicted in the movie. Her drawings have been clarified and confirmed by Chico Xavier to correspond to the spiritual city of Rio de Janeiro called "Our Home".

=== Visual effects ===
Nosso Lar is rich in special effects. The majority of the movie takes place in this spiritual city, which is famous in the Spiritist movement. Many spiritists and spiritualists waited anxiously for the release of the film that recorded the second highest debut of a Brazilian film since the rebirth of Brazilian cinema in the 1990s, after Elite Squad: The Enemy Within, released one month later.

For photography and special effects, international professionals were invited, including director of photography Ueli Steiger (from 10,000 BC and The Day After Tomorrow), special effects supervisor Lev Kolobov and the Canadian firm Intelligent Creatures (The Hunting Party, Babel, and Watchmen).
