= Chico Xavier =

Spiritualist and philanthropist from Brazil (1910–2002)

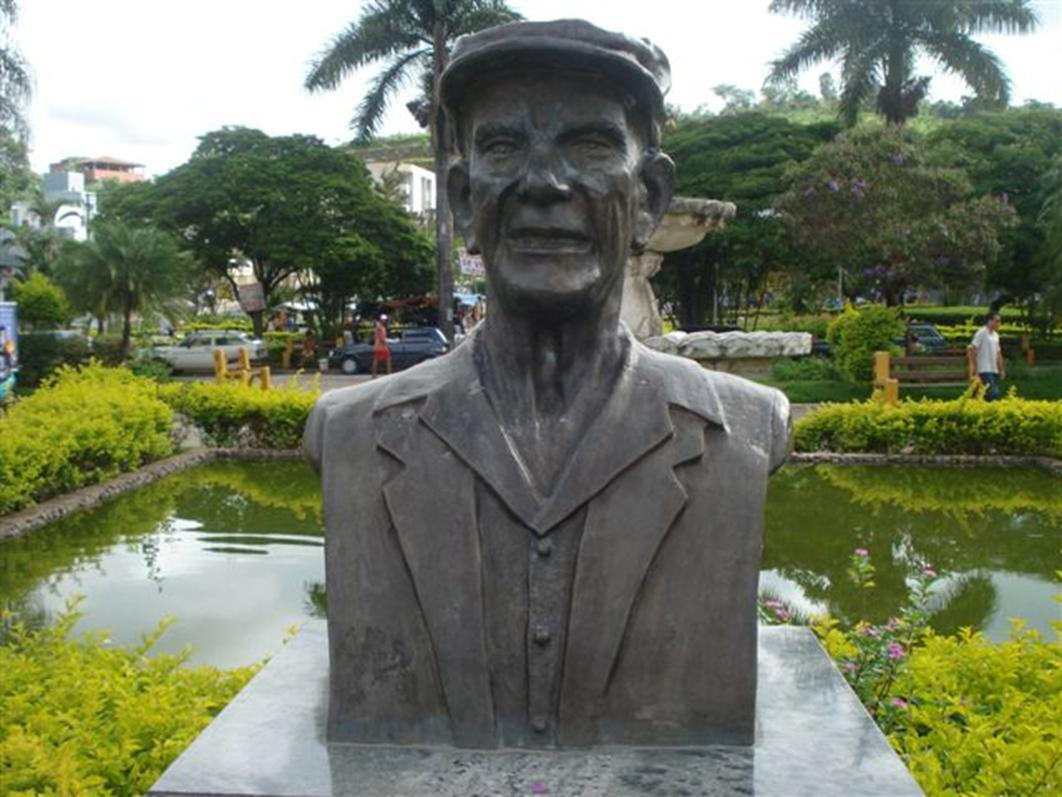
- Bust of Xavier in Pedro Leopoldo
- Born: Francisco Cândido Xavier (formerly Francisco de Paula Cândido); 2 April 1910; Pedro Leopoldo, Minas Gerais, Brazil
- Died: 30 June 2002 (aged 92); Uberaba, Minas Gerais, Brazil
- Known for: Popular medium and philanthropist of Spiritist movement

Francisco Cândido Xavier (2 April 1910 – 30 June 2002), born Francisco de Paula Cândido ([fɾɐ̃ˈsisku dʒi ˈpawlɐ ˈkɐ̃dʒidu]) and commonly known as Chico Xavier (Portuguese: [ˈʃiku ʃɐviˈɛʁ]), was a Brazilian philanthropist and spiritist medium. Over a period of 60 years, he published more than 400 books and several thousand letters claiming to use a process known as "psychography".

Xavier's works covered a wide range of topics, including religion, philosophy, historical romances and novels, Portuguese literature, poetry, and science, as well as thousands of letters intended to console bereaved families during his psychographic sessions. Estimates of the number of copies sold range from at least 25 million to 50 million.

Xavier believed that his spiritual guide Emmanuel lived in ancient Rome as Senator Publius Lentulus, was reincarnated in Spain as Father Damien, and later as a professor at the Sorbonne.

He often mentioned he could not contact a deceased person unless the spirit was willing to be contacted. In 2010, a movie biography entitled Chico Xavier was released in Brazil. Directed by Daniel Filho, the film dramatised Xavier's life.

On 3 October 2012, the SBT television TV show O Maior Brasileiro de Todos os Tempos named Chico Xavier "The Greatest Brazilian of all time", based on a viewer-supported survey.

Xavier has been accused of fraud regarding his claimed abilities, with critics questioning the authenticity of his prolific psychographic output. Scholars have studied him as a central figure of the Brazilian form of Spiritism, which absorbed elements of popular Catholicism.

== Early life ==
Xavier was born in Pedro Leopoldo in the state of Minas Gerais, on 2 April 1910, to João Cândido Xavier, a lottery ticket vendor, and Maria João de Deus, a Catholic housewife. His mother died when he was five. He attended school only up to the fourth year of primary school, and worked in a textile factory and later as a sales clerk.

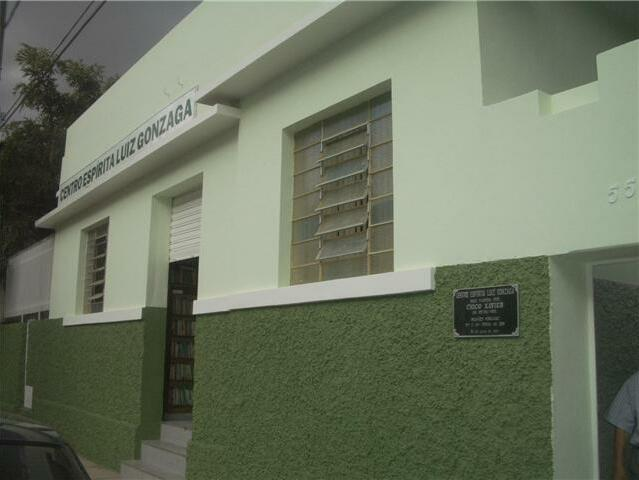
Spiritist Center Luiz Gonzaga (2008)

In 1927 his sister Maria Xavier had a mental illness that Spiritists attributed to spirit obsession, and the family turned to Spiritism. That year Xavier founded the Luiz Gonzaga Spiritist Center in a wooden shed belonging to his brother. Later, Xavier would claim that several deceased poets had begun to manifest themselves through him, but they only started to identify themselves in 1931.

== Pedro Leopoldo years ==
In 1928, Xavier published his first psychographic messages in the newspapers O Jornal in Rio de Janeiro, and Almanaque de Notícias, from Portugal. In 1931, according to Xavier, he met his spiritual mentor Emmanuel, who gave him a mission to psychograph a series of thirty books and to remain loyal to Jesus and to Allan Kardec, the founder of Spiritism. He became widely known in Brazil in 1932, when the Brazilian Spiritist Federation (FEB) published his first book, Parnaso de Além-Túmulo ("Parnassus from Beyond the Tomb"), a collection of poems he attributed to deceased Brazilian and Portuguese poets. Later, Xavier claimed that Emmanuel had previously been variously incarnated as the Roman senator Publius Lentulus, as a slave who sympathized with Christianity, and as Jesuit priest Manuel da Nóbrega.

From 1937 the FEB also published books that Xavier attributed to the spirit of the writer Humberto de Campos, who had died in December 1934. In 1944 Campos's widow, Catarina Vergolino de Campos, sued the FEB and Xavier, asking the court to declare whether the works came from her husband's spirit and, if so, to apply the copyright law. On 23 August 1944 a court in Rio de Janeiro, then the Federal District, dismissed the suit on the ground that she lacked standing, without ruling on authorship; the appeals court upheld the decision. Xavier's later books in the same vein were credited to "Irmão X" ("Brother X"), presented as a pseudonym of Campos.

In 1944 the FEB published Xavier's novel Nosso Lar, attributed to the spirit André Luiz, the first of a series of 13 books that ended with E a Vida Continua... (1968). It became the FEB's best-selling title after Kardec's works and had been translated into Spanish, English, Japanese and Esperanto by 1968; it has sold nearly two million copies. A film adaptation was released in 2010.

In 1944, journalist David Nasser and photographer Jean Manzon went to Pedro Leopoldo to write a report on Xavier for the Rio de Janeiro-based magazine O Cruzeiro, that Xavier's followers deem to have shown him in an unflattering light. At first, they tried to reach Xavier at the Fazenda Modelo, the State-run farm where he was employed as a typist for most of his life, but the farm's director denied them access, saying that Xavier was tired and needed rest. According to the report, they met with Xavier, never telling him for whom they were working, as he returned from the farm accompanied by a gentleman from Rio who would come to spend weeks at a time with Xavier. The man described Xavier as "[...] a cultured lad. He discusses many subjects, reads a little English and French." and as "a voracious reader" who would have gone through a copy of Man, the Unknown given to him in under five hours. Photos in the story show Xavier's home library with piles of books, with him reading and taking notes.

Xavier's followers claim that Nasser and Manzon gave fake names in order to test Xavier's powers. In an interview in 1980, Nasser said that one night, "Manzon called me and said, 'Have you seen the book that Chico Xavier gave to us?'. I said no. 'Well, take a look,' he said. I was in my library, I picked up the book and written there was this: 'To my brother David Nasser, from Emmanuel'. He had made a similar dedication to Manzon. It is things like that make me very afraid to get involved in Spiritism issues."

== Uberaba years ==
In the late 1950s Xavier met the physician and medium Waldo Vieira, with whom he psychographed several books; Vieira broke with Spiritism in the mid-1960s. In 1959 Xavier moved to Uberaba, where he lived for the rest of his life. Uberaba became a destination for bereaved families, many of them mothers, hoping for messages from dead relatives; Xavier recorded more than 10,000 such letters and charged nothing for them. He also organized regular distributions of food and clothing to the poor of the city.

In 1971 Xavier was interviewed twice on TV Tupi's show Pinga-Fogo. The first broadcast, planned to last an hour, ran for nearly three and drew one of the largest audiences in Brazilian television; the second, later that year, lasted four hours and was watched by an estimated 20 million people. The appearance has been described as the first mediumistic session shown on Brazilian television.

== Death ==
Xavier died of a heart attack at his home in Uberaba on 30 June 2002, aged 92. According to his friends and family, Xavier had expressed a wish to God to die on a day when the people of Brazil were immersed in happiness and national celebration, believing that this would lessen the sadness of his departure. His death came on the day Brazil won the 2002 FIFA World Cup. About 100,000 people attended his wake at the Casa da Prece, the Spiritist center where he had received visitors for approximately forty years, and the state of Minas Gerais declared three days of official mourning.

== Reception ==
Anthropologists have studied Xavier as a figure of Brazilian religious culture. Bernardo Lewgoy describes him as a mediator "between two worlds" whose Spiritism absorbed elements of popular Catholicism, combining the model of the renouncing saint with that of the disciplined, obedient citizen. Sandra Stoll notes that most of what is known about his life comes from biographies written by others, which follow the structure of Catholic hagiography.

In 2010, Kentaro Mori published an article in the Skeptical Inquirer which accused Xavier of fraud. According to Mori, Xavier's close associate Waldo Vieira stated that the staff at Xavier's Spiritist Center in Brazil would help him by gathering information about his clients and faking psychic letters. He was also accused of using perfume in the séance room, which was a common Spiritualist trick to pretend the scent was of supernatural origin. Xavier was associated with the spiritist medium Otília Diogo, who fraudulently pretended to be a spirit by covering herself in white sheets, with a photo of Xavier and a sheeted Diogo being taken in 1964. The skeptic Karen Stollznow has also accused Xavier of hot reading.

A 2014 study published by parapsychologists in the journal Explore investigated the accuracy of information contained in 13 letters allegedly written by Chico Xavier through psychography (automatic writing) between 1974 and 1979, and claimed that Xavier made 99 accurate claims that he could not have made without supernatural means. The paper was criticized by skeptics and science journalists. Carlos Orsi, in Galileu magazine, and Maurício Tuffani, in the newspaper Folha de S.Paulo, questioned the credibility of the results and attributed the apparent support for Xavier's authenticity to methodological flaws. They also criticized the article because of the low impact factor of the Explore journal. Tuffani published a subsequent response from the parapsychologist Alexander Moreira-Almeida, one of the authors of the article, but did not retract his criticisms.

== Psychographic works ==
Xavier published more than 400 books that he attributed to spirits, writing through the process Spiritists call psychography. He denied being their author, saying that he only transcribed what spirits dictated, and he gave the royalties to publishers and charities while living on his salary as a low-ranking civil servant. Some of his letters to bereaved families were admitted as evidence in criminal trials. In one case in Goiás, the jury acquitted the defendant, José Divino Nunes, by six votes to one after a letter attributed to the victim was read in court.

Parnaso de Além-Túmulo included poems attributed to the Portuguese poets João de Deus, Antero de Quental and Guerra Junqueiro and the Brazilians Olavo Bilac, Cruz e Sousa and Augusto dos Anjos, among others. It divided critics: Humberto de Campos discussed it in two newspaper columns in July 1932, while the critics Eloy Pontes and Eduardo Frieiro described Xavier's mediumistic writing as pastiche. The literary scholar Alexandre Caroli Rocha concluded that any firm verdict on the authorship of Xavier's texts requires first assuming a theory about life after death or about mediumship.

In the 1990s an estimated 50 million Spiritist books were in circulation in Brazil, 15 million of them by Xavier and 12 million by Kardec.

== Tributes ==
In 1981 a petition with more than two million signatures supported his candidacy for the Nobel Peace Prize.

In 1999, the Government of the State of Minas Gerais established the "Commendation of Peace Chico Xavier", an award which is annually awarded to individuals or legal entities who work for peace and social well-being.

In 2000, in a poll held by TV Globo Minas, he was voted the greatest mineiro (native of Minas Gerais) of the 20th century, ahead of Alberto Santos-Dumont and Juscelino Kubitschek.

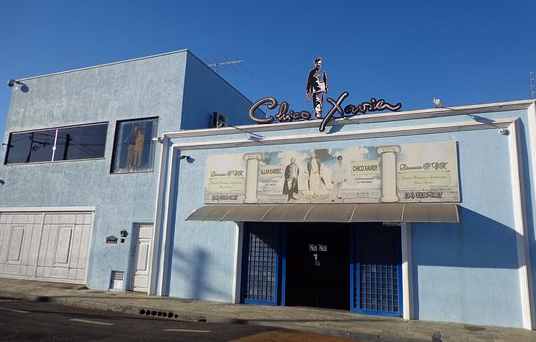
House where Chico Xavier lived and spent most of his career in Spiritism for most of his life, in Uberaba, Minas Gerais.

After Chico Xavier died, the house where he lived between 1948 and 1959 and the house he lived in between 1959 and 2002 were transformed into non-profit museums in reference to his life and work; and the interior of Pedro Leopoldo's Modelo Farm, where he worked as a typist between 1930 and the late 1950s, was also transformed into a memorial in his honor.

In 2006 a poll by Época magazine named him the greatest Brazilian in history.

In 2009 a federal law named a stretch of the BR-050 highway after him.

In 2010, his centenary was marked by numerous celebrations in Brazil, including a special postage stamp. In April 2010, the film Chico Xavier was released, based on the biography As Vidas de Chico Xavier ("The lives of Chico Xavier") by journalist Marcel Souto Maior, and directed and produced by Daniel Filho. Xavier was portrayed by actors Matheus Costa, Ângelo Antônio and Nelson Xavier, respectively, during three phases of his life: from 1918 to 1922, 1931 to 1959 and 1969 to 1975.

In 2012 viewers of the SBT show O Maior Brasileiro de Todos os Tempos ("The Greatest Brazilian of All Time") voted him the winner, with 71.4% of the vote in the final against Alberto Santos-Dumont and Princess Isabel.

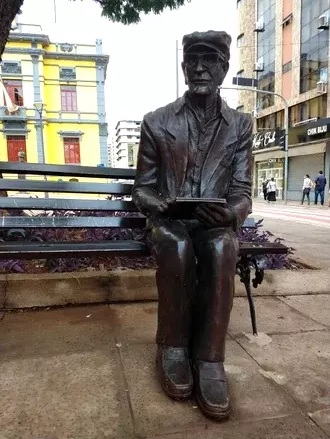
Statue of Chico Xavier at Praça Rui Barbosa, in Uberaba, made by visual artist Vânia Braga.

In 2013, Xavier's hometown of Uberaba began the construction of a memorial in his honor. The Chico Xavier Memorial was inaugurated in 2016, built in collaboration between the Chico Xavier Institute and the city hall.

On 29 October 2020, a life-size bronze statue of Xavier was unveiled at Praça Rui Barbosa in Uberaba. It was made by visual artist Vânia Braga.

Under Federal Law No. 14.201 of 2021, Xavier's name was inscribed in Livro dos Heróis e Heroínas da Pátria (the Book of Heroes and Heroines of the Fatherland), a document that preserves the names of figures who marked the history of Brazil and is found in the Tancredo Neves Pantheon of the Fatherland and Freedom, in Brasilia.

== Selected works ==
Year	Book	English version	Spiritual author	Publisher
1932	Parnaso de Além-Túmulo		Several	FEB
1937	Crônicas de Além-Túmulo		Humberto de Campos	FEB
1938	Emmanuel		Emmanuel	FEB
1938	Brasil, Coração do Mundo, Pátria do Evangelho		Humberto de Campos	FEB
1939	A Caminho da Luz	On the Way to the Light	Emmanuel	FEB
1939	Há Dois Mil Anos	Two Thousand Years Ago	Emmanuel	FEB
1940	Cinquenta Anos Depois	Fifty Years Later	Emmanuel	FEB
1941	O Consolador		Emmanuel	FEB
1942	Paulo e Estêvão	Paul and Stephen	Emmanuel	FEB
1942	Renúncia	Renunciation	Emmanuel	FEB
1944	Nosso Lar	Nosso Lar: Life in the Spirit World	André Luiz	FEB
1944	Os Mensageiros	The Messengers	André Luiz	FEB
1945	Missionários da Luz	Missionaries of the Light	André Luiz	FEB
1946	Lázaro Redivivo		Irmão X	FEB
1946	Obreiros da Vida Eterna	Workers of the Eternal Life	André Luiz	FEB
1947	Volta Bocage		Bocage	FEB
1948	No Mundo Maior	In the Greater World	André Luiz	FEB
1948	Agenda Cristã	Christian Agenda	André Luiz	FEB
1949	Voltei		Irmão Jacob	FEB
1949	Caminho, Verdade e Vida	The Pathway, The Truth and Life	Emmanuel	FEB
1949	Libertação	Liberation	André Luiz	FEB
1950	Jesus no Lar	Jesus in the Home	Neio Lúcio	FEB
1950	Pão Nosso	Our Daily Bread	Emmanuel	FEB
1952	Vinha de Luz		Emmanuel	FEB
1952	Roteiro		Emmanuel	FEB
1953	Ave, Cristo!		Emmanuel	FEB
1954	Entre a Terra e o Céu	Between Heaven and Earth	André Luiz	FEB
1955	Nos Domínios da Mediunidade	In the Realms of Mediumship	André Luiz	FEB
1956	Fonte Viva		Emmanuel	FEB
1957	Ação e Reação	Action and Reaction	André Luiz	FEB
1958	Pensamento e Vida		Emmanuel	FEB
1959	Evolução em Dois Mundos		André Luiz	FEB
1960	Mecanismos da Mediunidade		André Luiz	FEB
1960	Religião dos Espíritos		Emmanuel	FEB
1961	O Espírito da Verdade		Several	FEB
1963	Sexo e Destino	Sex and Destiny	André Luiz	FEB
1964	"Desobsessão"	Disobsession	André Luiz	FEB
1968	E a Vida Continua...	And Life Goes On	André Luiz	FEB
1970	Vida e Sexo		Emmanuel	FEB
1971	Sinal Verde		André Luiz	Comunhão Espírita; Cristã (CEC)
1977	Companheiro		Emmanuel	Instituto de Difusão; Espírita (IDE)
1985	Retratos da Vida		Cornélio Pires	IDE/CEC
1986	Mediunidade e Sintonia		Emmanuel	CEU
1991	Queda e Ascensão da Casa dos Benefícios		Bezerra de Menezes	GER
1999	Escada de Luz		Several	CEU

== See also ==
- Eurípedes Barsanulfo
- Divaldo Pereira Franco
