= Obsession (Spiritism) =

Interference of spirits

Obsession, also known as spirit obsession, is a technical term within the Spiritist belief and practice defined by the author Allan Kardec as the interference of a subjugating spirit with a weaker spirit (cf. Latin obsidere, "besiege"). Although the term most commonly refers to the negative influence of the spirit of an evil deceased person on the mind or spirit of a living person, obsession can occur in either direction.

Obsession is believed by many Spiritists to be a major danger to unprepared and untrained mediums. It is also believed to be one of the most frequent causes of mental illness and criminal behaviour.

Because the danger of obsession is a core belief within Spiritism, dealing with it is one of the cornerstones of Spiritist religious activity, and it is treated at Spiritist centres by means of prayer and teaching. Its centrality to Spiritist doctrine and practice is one of the marks that generally distinguishes Spiritism from both Spiritualism and the Spiritual Church Movement. However, the 19th century Spiritualist author Paschal Beverly Randolph also recognized the dangers of obsession to mediums, and claimed to have been harmed by evil spirits during his own career as a Spiritualist lecturer and trance medium.

== Types ==
Technically, "obsession" is any unwanted influence of a spirit, when it alters or suppresses the normal manifestation of the personality of the subject. It can occur when:

- a spirit influences a living person,
- a living person influences someone else,
- a living person influences a spirit,
- a spirit influences another spirit.

In the first case the victim suffers but does not know where the suffering comes from. The obsessed may be led to behave abnormally without apparent reason and will not be able to explain their deeds or crimes.

In the second case the victim knows they are being influenced and usually reacts, but is unable to resist the will of the obsessor. The victim may resort to violence.

The third case mostly occurs when the spirit of a deceased person is not able to break their bonds with the living and hangs around, suffering as the living suffers.

The fourth case is mostly like the second but occurs in the spirit world.

== Degrees of obsession ==
Kardec proposed a classification of obsessions into three levels (of severity):

1. Simple: The spirit influencing the medium cannot disguise their presence. The medium knows that they are being obsessed and, therefore, can resist it. This type of obsession disturbs both the medium and those for whom they are carrying messages, especially because the medium may let slip random sentences due to influence of the obsessor(s), much to the surprise of those present. Uncontrolled, this form of obsession may cause the medium to be seen as mentally ill; at the least it will subject them to ridicule and destroy their self-esteem. Simple obsession is usually the result of the action of low spirits devoted to evil that take pleasure in the suffering imposed on the medium. This type of obsession is usually linked to revenge, and the spirit generally wants the victim to know the spirit's identity and motive.
2. Fascination: The spirit influencing the medium does not bother to disguise themself (or intentionally reveals themself), but disempowers the medium by cunning means, so that the victim will see whatever the spirit dictates as the purest expression of truth. The obsessing spirit will stop mediumistic communications from any other sources, so that the medium comes to depend solely on the subjugating spirit and will produce a large output of communication, mostly worthless. Fascination may be plotted to destroy someone's life or as an instrument to spread worthless theories that will hinder the progress of mankind. Some spirits also take pleasure from seeing the nonsensical things the mediums will do and preach following their advice.
3. Subjugation: The spirit overcomes the medium's will to the extent of controlling their body as the spirit's own. During the obsession crisis, the victim will not act as themself and will pursue whatever agenda the obsessing spirit has in mind. After the crisis, the victim may not remember anything, or may remember everything with great regret. Subjugation is of utmost danger because it reveals murderous designs on the part of the obsessor. The victim is often used as instrument to inflict pain on others or to commit crimes. Sometimes the obsessor wants to destroy the victim's life, but it may be the case that the victim is merely the instrument of revenge against the real target of the obsessor.

== Causes of obsession ==
Obsession has the same kinds of motivation found among criminals who commit earthly crimes, namely (envy, revenge, prejudice, and sadism). Additionally, there are motivations specific to spirits.

- A lust for pleasures that the spirit, without a body of its own, cannot experience may lead the spirit to obsess a living person in order to share their emotions, eventually leading the victim to do things so that the spirit can partake of the victim's feelings.
- An unconscious desire to punish or cause suffering to someone one hates or envies may lead the spirit of a living person to use its relative freedom during sleep to attempt to obsess another living person.
- Prolonged grief for a deceased loved one may lead to the retention of strong bonds between the living and the dead, preventing the latter from leaving the world and going on with their missions.

== Mediumship and obsession ==
The entire 13th chapter of The Book on Mediums is dedicated to the subject of spirit obsession, mostly with the intention of warning new mediums of the dangers and responsibilities involved.

According to Spiritist belief, we are all born with the gift of mediumship, but only a minority of mankind retains this ability into adulthood, and anyone who suffers from obsession has developed his mediumship to some extent. However, most people who are mediums are not aware of their condition and do not know how to deal with it.

== Prevention and treatment ==
Not all mental perturbations have spiritual origins. It is necessary to rule out psychological or psychiatric causes prior to any spiritual treatment. For instance, "to hear voices" may be a case of obsession, but is usually a simple case of psychosis.

Prevention of obsession is achieved by means of three precautions:

- Learning and developing one's mediumship, if it is strong enough to be used as an instrument by obsessors (one may want to develop his mediumship for other reasons as well).
- Living according to the commandments of God so that one's moral stature can act as a wall between him and the "inferior" would-be obsessors.
- Praying for God's protection and guidance whenever one's will is weakened.

The treatment for obsession is termed disobsession in Kardecist Spiritism. The cure is a lengthy process that involves all of the above treatments, but also:

- Participation on mediunic meetings to assess the reasons why the obsessor is acting.
- Forgiving and asking forgiveness by means of praying the Lord's Prayer.
- Befriend the obsessors (with the help of a Spiritist Centre) so that he understands his condition and how his behaviour is hampering his progress towards his own happiness.

In overall, the solution to problem of obsession is threefold:

- Learning the doctrine of the law of cause and effect
- Living according to the doctrine of Christ (Faith, Hope and Charity)
- Loving each other as Christ taught, forgiving and asking forgiveness

== Purpose ==
Although obsession is usually understood as an undesirable "side effect" of practicing spiritism, some proponents accept that some cases are intended to be "show cases" to attract the public interest towards spiritism. The victims in such cases may be either people who chose to suffer obsession to purge their guilt for being obsessors in previous incarnations or people who accepted to suffer for altruism, so that more people could find evidence of the existence of spirits.

== See also ==
- Heaven and Hell (book)
- Karma in Spiritism
- Spirit possession
- Demonology
- Discernment of spirits
- Exorcism
