= Humberto de Campos =

Coordinates: 2°36′S 43°28′W

- Municipality
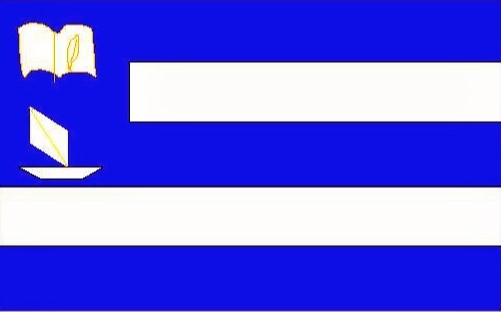
- Flag
- Interactive map of Humberto de Campos
- Country: Brazil
- Region: Nordeste
- State: Maranhão
- Mesoregion: Norte Maranhense

Population (2020)
  - Total: 28,932
- Time zone: UTC−3 (BRT)

Humberto de Campos is a municipality in the state of Maranhão in the Northeast region of Brazil. It is named after the Brazilian writer Humberto de Campos.

The municipality contains part of the 1,535,310-hectare (3,793,800-acre) Upaon-Açu/Miritiba/Alto Preguiças Environmental Protection Area, created in 1992.

== See also ==
- List of municipalities in Maranhão
