= Brazilian Spiritist Federation =

Religious organization

Logo of Brazilian Spiritist Federation

The Brazilian Spiritist Federation (FEB), founded in 1884, is a public utility body that constitutes the most important and influential representative organization of Spiritism in Brazil and in nearly all countries where the Spiritist movement is present.

Through notable Spiritist leaders, especially Bezerra de Menezes, the Brazilian Spiritist Federation quickly established the format of Spiritism as a religion in Brazil. In various countries, the federation provides extensive support to mediums, speakers, and other Spiritist organizations, publishes and translates books on the subject, and promotes charitable actions. The FEB is the representative association of Brazil in the International Spiritist Council (CEI).

According to data from 2006, the FEB provided philanthropic social assistance to approximately a thousand families and maintained a daycare center for 800 children in Santo Antônio do Descoberto, Goiás. The FEB has published over 10 million books by Allan Kardec. The works psychographed by the mediumship of Francisco Cândido Xavier, better known as Chico Xavier, have surpassed 15.5 million copies. Among them, Nosso Lar (dictated by the spirit André Luiz) is the most read, having surpassed the mark of 1.5 million copies.

== History ==
=== Origins and foundation ===
The roots of the national federative organization date back to the publication, in Rio de Janeiro, then the capital of the Empire, on January 21, 1883, of the periodical "Reformador", initiated and financed by Augusto Elias da Silva, a Portuguese photographer who settled in Brazil, with intellectual direction by Major Francisco Raimundo Ewerton Quadros. It should be remembered that in the same year, Elias da Silva organized a fraternal meeting of Spiritist leaders due to the disagreements among the members of Spiritist institutions in the capital at that time – the Grupo dos Humildes, the Sociedade Acadêmica Deus, Cristo e Caridade, the Centro da União Espírita do Brasil, and the Grupo Espírita Fraternidade.

With these factors combined, the Brazilian Spiritist Federation was founded on January 1, 1884, in a meeting organized by Elias da Silva. In addition to Augusto Elias da Silva, Francisco Raimundo Ewerton Quadros, Manoel Fernandes Filgueiras, João Francisco da Silveira Pinto, Maria Balbina da Conceição Batista, Matilde Elias da Silva, Luis Móllica, Elvira P. Móllica, José Agostinho Marques Porto, Francisco Antônio Xavier Pinheiro, Manoel Estêvão de Amorim, and Quádrio Léo were present.

On the following day (January 2), its first board of directors was elected and inaugurated, consisting of Major Ewerton Quadros as president, Fernandes Filgueiras as vice-president, Silveira Pinto as secretary, Elias da Silva as treasurer, and Xavier Pinheiro as archivist. The institution was initially headquartered in Elias da Silva's own residence, a house on Rua da Carioca, 120.

=== First decades ===
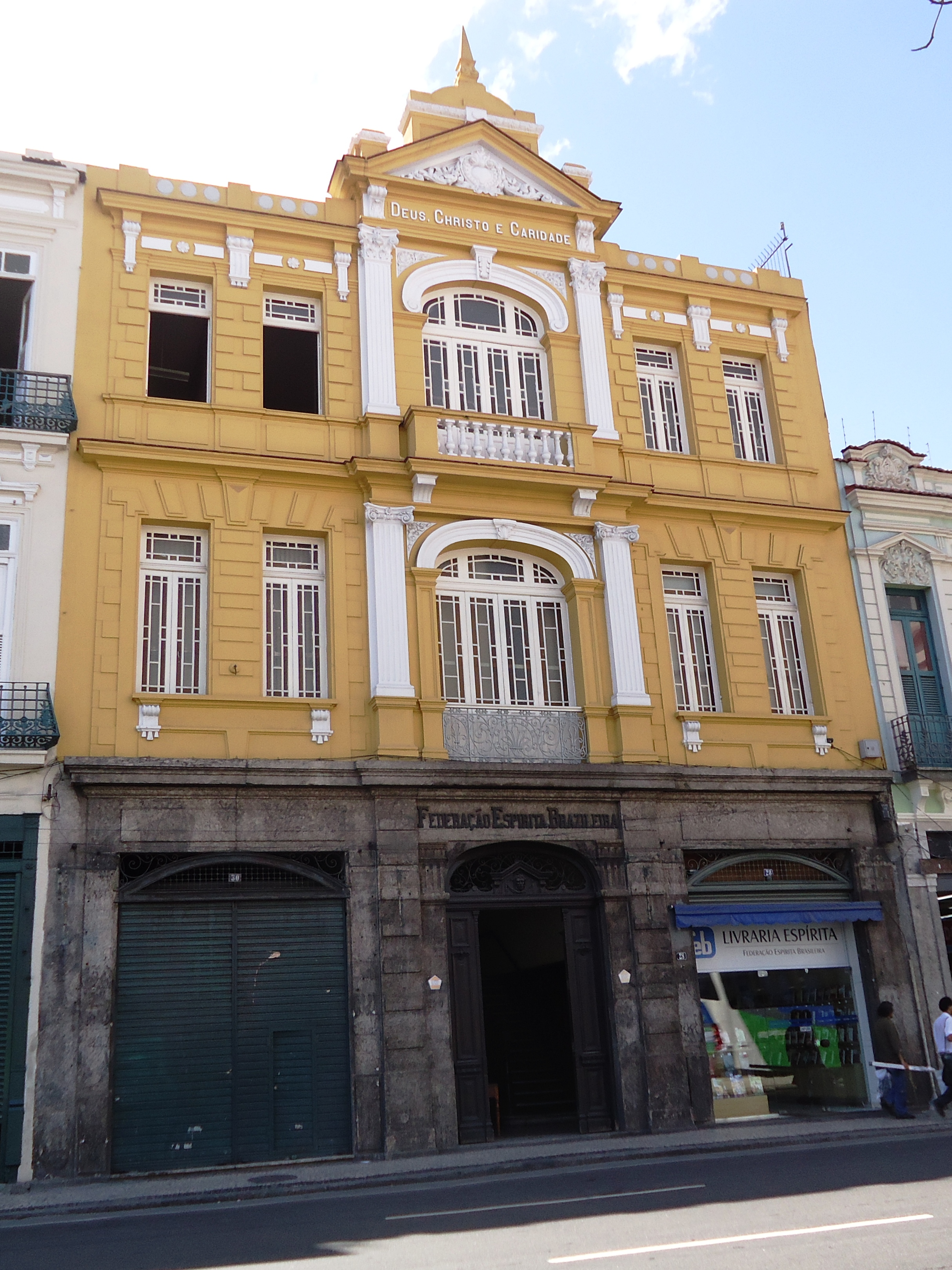
Former headquarters on Avenida Passos, in Rio de Janeiro.

In its founding year, the Brazilian Spiritist Federation soon began charitable social work. However, in its early years, the FEB also faced various difficulties, both administrative and financial, as well as ideological issues internally, and the political and social upheavals of the country's capital externally. As an example of the former, there was a division within the movement between the so-called "secular" or "scientific" faction, led by Professor Afonso Angeli Torteroli, and the "religious" or "mystical" faction, led by Dr. Bezerra de Menezes. As an example of the latter, following the Abolition of Slavery (1888), the Proclamation of the Brazilian Republic (1889) occurred along with the upheavals experienced during the Republic of the Sword, including the Second Naval Revolt (1893). These circumstances led to the departure of a significant portion of the FEB's initial members, leaving the survival of the institution in the hands of a few collaborators.

In 1889, Ewerton Quadros was succeeded by Dr. Adolfo Bezerra de Menezes. As the head of the institution, Bezerra consolidated the "religious" aspect of Spiritism as the most prominent in Brazil. He initially introduced the systematic study of The Spirits' Book in the public meetings held at the Federation. In 1890, the "Service for Assistance to the Needy" was established, which was an important basis for the activities of prescribing mediums in the institution. In the beginning of 1895, Bezerra was succeeded by Júlio César Leal. After Leal resigned after seven months in office, Bezerra accepted reappointment and resumed the Presidency of the Federation on August 3, 1895, a position he held until his death in 1900. During his term, the FEB's bookstore was inaugurated (March 31, 1897), responsible for editing, distributing, and promoting Spiritist literature. However, at least until 1910, all the "classics of Spiritism" released by the FEB's bookstore were edited by the publishing company H. Garnier, renowned for its meticulous book editing.

=== First half of the 20th century ===
After several changes of address since its founding, the FEB's own headquarters was inaugurated on December 10, 1911, on the former Rua do Sacramento (currently Av. Passos, 28–30), in Rio de Janeiro, by Leopoldo Cirne. The following year (1912), on May 3, the FEB inaugurated the "Free Course of Esperanto".

In 1932, the FEB published its first major editorial success: "Parnaso de Além-Túmulo" (Parnassus from Beyond the Tomb), which gained great attention from the press and the Brazilian public. The format of the work was not new; it followed the pattern of another work whose rights the institution already possessed – Do País da Luz (4 volumes) – a collection of messages (texts, letters, and poems) mostly from renowned deceased authors of Portuguese literature, received in the first decade of the 20th century by the Portuguese medium Fernando de Lacerda. The authorship of the texts in "Parnaso," received through the mediumship and psychography of the then young Francisco Cândido Xavier, was predominantly from figures in Brazilian literature.

In 1936, the Department of Esperanto was established at the FEB. On the eve of the establishment of the Estado Novo (New State) in 1937, on October 27, the FEB's premises were closed by the police, but three days later, they were reopened by the order of Dr. Macedo Soares, who was then the Minister of Justice.

The period was also marked by the lawsuit initiated in 1944 by the widow of writer Humberto de Campos against the FEB and Francisco Cândido Xavier, seeking the alleged copyright over the psychographed messages attributed to her deceased husband. Since then, the entity began using the pseudonym "Irmão X" (Brother X). After the end of World War II, the institution brought to light the first edition of The Spirits' Book in Esperanto (1946). Two years later, on September 9, 1948, the FEB inaugurated its "Publishing and Graphics Department".

The event that marked the end of the 1940s was the signing, on October 5, 1949, of the so-called "Golden Pact", considered the most important document of Spiritism in the country as it represented the unification of the Spiritist movement at the national level through the coordination of the FEB. As a result of the document's signing, on January 2, 1950, the Federative Council of the FEB (CFN) was established in Rio de Janeiro, bringing together the representatives of the signing State Spiritist Federations. As a result of this effort, the "Caravan of Fraternity" was sent to the Northeast Region of Brazil, composed of, among others, Artur Lins de Vasconcelos Lopes, Carlos Jordão da Silva, and Leopoldo Machado. This initiative led to an increase in the number of adhering state federations.

=== Second half of the 20th century ===
Finally, in 1960, in the context of the transfer of the capital of the country from Rio de Janeiro to Brasília, the then President of the Republic, Juscelino Kubitschek, declared the FEB a Public Utility Entity. In 1967, the institution inaugurated its Brasília Section in the Federal District (October 3).

A decade later (1977), the FEB established the Campaign for the Evangelization of Childhood and Youth and published "Adaptation of Spiritist Centers for Better Service to their Purposes". This work was followed in 1980 by "Guidelines for Spiritist Centers". In 1984, the FEB established the campaign for the Systematic Study of Spiritist Doctrine (ESDE), released the "Manual of Administration of Spiritist Centers," and relocated its headquarters to Brasília in its own building.

In 1990, the campaigns "In Defense of Life" and "Living in Family" were launched, along with the publications "Spiritist Social Communication" and "Spiritist Assistance and Promotion". In 1996, the FEB launched its website in four languages: Portuguese, English, French, and Spanish.

== List of presidents ==
Since 1884, FEB has had 16 presidents.

- 1884 – 1888: Francisco Raimundo Ewerton Quadros
- 1889: Adolfo Bezerra de Menezes
- 1890 – 1894: Francisco de Menezes Dias da Cruz
- 1895 (January) – 1895 (August): Júlio César Leal
- 1895 (August) – 1900 (April): Adolfo Bezerra de Menezes
- 1900 – 1913: Leopoldo Cirne
- 1914: Aristides de Souza Spínola
- 1915: Manuel Justiniano de Freitas Quintão
- 1916 – 1917: Aristides de Souza Spínola
- 1918 – 1919: Manuel Justiniano de Freitas Quintão
- 1920 – 1921: Luiz Olímpio Guillon Ribeiro
- 1922 – 1924: Aristides de Souza Spínola
- 1925 – 1926: Luís Barreto Alves Ferreira
- 1927 – 1928: Francisco Vieira Paim Pamplona
- 1929: Manuel Justiniano de Freitas Quintão
- 1930 – 1943: Luiz Olímpio Guillon Ribeiro
- 1943 – 1970: Antônio Wantuil de Freitas
- 1970 – 1975: Armando de Oliveira Assis
- 1975 – 1990: Francisco Thiesen
- 1990 – 2001: Juvanir Borges de Souza
- 2001 – 2012: Nestor João Masotti
- 2013 – 2015: Antonio Cesar Perri de Carvalho
- 2015 – present: Jorge Godinho Barreto Nery

== Federative state entities ==
In each Brazilian state and the Federal District, there is an institution that, autonomously and independently, integrates the Brazilian Spiritist Federation for more direct support to spiritist centers:

- State Spiritist Council of Rio de Janeiro (CEERJ)
- Amazonas Spiritist Federation (FEA)
- Santa Catarina Spiritist Federation (FEC)
- Rondônia Spiritist Federation
- Amapá Spiritist Federation
- Federal District Spiritist Federation (FEDF)
- Bahia Spiritist Federation (FEEB)
- Alagoas Spiritist Federation
- Goiás Spiritist Federation
- Sergipe Spiritist Federation (FEES)
- Acre Spiritist Federation
- Ceará Spiritist Federation (FEEC)
- Espírito Santo Spiritist Federation (FEEES)
- Tocantins Spiritist Federation (FEETINS)
- Mato Grosso Spiritist Federation (FEEMT)
- Maranhão Spiritist Federation (FEMAR)
- Mato Grosso do Sul Spiritist Federation (FEMS)
- Paraná Spiritist Federation (FEP)
- Rio Grande do Norte Spiritist Federation (FERN)
- Rio Grande do Sul Spiritist Federation (FERGS)
- Paraíba Spiritist Federation (FEPB)
- Pernambuco Spiritist Federation (FEP)
- Piauí Spiritist Federation (FEPI)
- Roraima Spiritist Federation
- Union of Spiritist Societies of the State of São Paulo (USE-SP)
- Minas Gerais Spiritist Union (UEM)
- Pará Spiritist Union (UEP)

== Specialized entities ==
FEB collaborates with the following specialized entities, which are part of its Federative Council:

- Brazilian Association of Spiritist Disseminators – ABRADE
- Crusade of Spiritist Military Personnel – CME
- Institute of Spiritist Culture of Brazil – ICEB
- Brazilian Association of Spiritist Magistrates – ABRAME
- Brazilian Association of Spiritist Artists – ABRARTE
- Brazilian Spiritist Medical Association – AME-Brasil

== See also ==
- Spiritist Doctrine
- Portuguese Spiritist Federation
- History of Spiritism in Brazil

== Bibliography ==
- ARRIBAS, Célia da Graça. Afinal, espiritismo é religião?: A doutrina espírita na formação da diversidade religiosa brasileira. São Paulo: Ed. Alameda, 2010.
