= Nosso Lar =

1944 novel

Nosso Lar: Life in the Spirit World
- First edition
- Authors: André Luiz; Chico Xavier
- Original title: Nosso Lar
- Translator: Darrel W. Kimble; Marcia M. Saiz
- Language: Portuguese
- Series: Life in the Spirit World
- Published: 1944 (Brazil: Portuguese)
- Publisher: Livraria Editora da Federacao
- Publication place: Brazil
- ISBN: 8598161217
- Followed by: The Messengers

Nosso Lar: Life in the Spirit World (Portuguese: Nosso Lar), also known as Astral City, is a novel by the Brazilian spiritist medium Francisco Cândido Xavier. First published in 1944, it tells the story of André Luiz, a prominent doctor who lived in the city of Rio de Janeiro. After dying, André Luiz finds himself neither in Heaven nor Hell, depicted in the teachings he had received during his Catholic upbringing, but rather in the so-called umbral, a region where less-than-perfect souls face the consequences of their infelicitous actions while alive. After a while, he is able to perceive the presence of Clarêncio, a friendly spirit who had been trying to help him all along during his time in umbral. Clarêncio then takes him to Nosso Lar, a spirit colony, or astral city, where André becomes acquainted with the intricacies of afterlife and reincarnation. The novel was adapted into the 2010 film Astral City: A Spiritual Journey

For followers of Spiritism, the story of André Luiz, written under a pseudonym and psychographed by Chico Xavier, is considered a narrative based on real spiritual experiences. The locations and events described in Nosso Lar are believed to reflect actual places and occurrences in the spirit realm.
