= Legion of Good Will =

Brazilian non-profit organization

- Legião da Boa Vontade
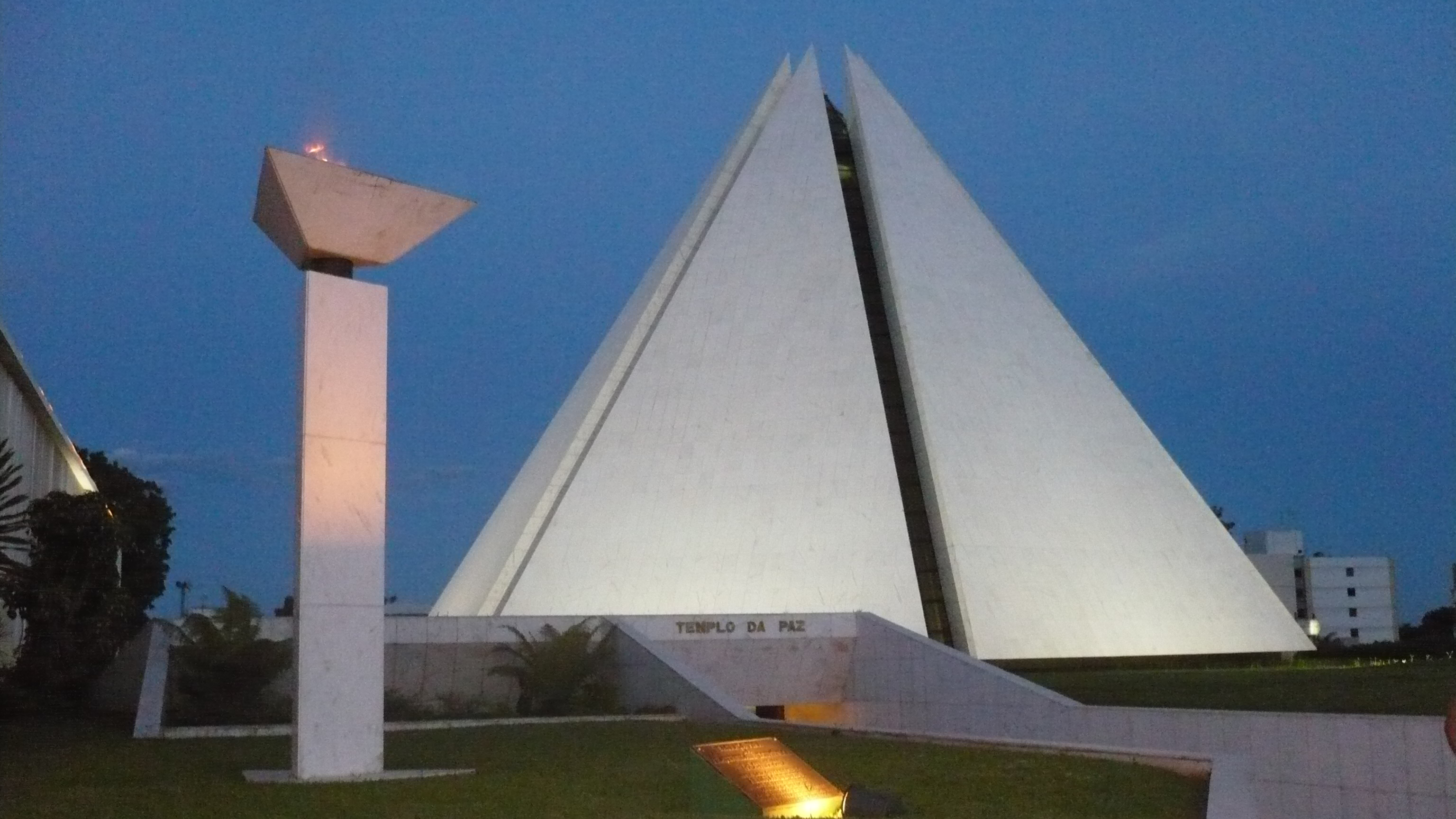
- Temple of Good Will, in Brasília
- Formation: January 1, 1950; 76 years ago
- Founder: Alziro Zarur
- Type: Non-governmental organization, nonprofit organization
- Purpose: Social work, promoting education, culture and ecumenical spirituality
- Headquarters: São Paulo, Brazil
- Director-President: José de Paiva Netto (1979–2025)
- Website: https://www.lgw.org/hunger

Legion of Good Will (LGW, Portuguese: Legião da Boa Vontade, LBV) is a Brazilian charitable, non-profit organization, whose purpose is the social work, promoting education, culture and ecumenism. Founded on January 1, 1950, by the radio personality Alziro Zarur, it was inspired by spiritism. The institution has autonomous units in Portugal, Argentina, Bolivia, Paraguay, the United States and Uruguay.

== History ==
On January 6, 1948, Alziro Zarur was at a meeting of the Brazilian Spiritist Federation when a medium told him that Saint Francis of Assisi, who would be accompanying him, had told him it was time to begin. This prompted the radio host to research the saint's life and discover his mission.

A year later, he started a program on Rádio Globo called Hora da Boa Vontade (Hour of Good Will), preaching the Apocalypse, which made the program a huge success. In 1950, on January 1, Brazil's Universal Brotherhood Day, he officially founded the organization. Zarur led the organization until his death in 1979, when he was replaced by radio presenter and writer José de Paiva Netto. Paiva Netto died on 7 October 2025 in Rio de Janeiro aged 84.

The organization became known for its Charity Rounds, which distributed soups, food and clothes, and offered minor nursing and barbering services to the homeless. In 1998, in partnership with the TV channel Rede Bandeirantes, it carried out one of the most massive solidarity mobilizations ever seen in Brazil on behalf of agricultural workers affected by the drought in northeastern Brazil. The organization distributed more than 4.1 million kilos of food to around a million people in more than 1,100 locations.

The LGW was the first Brazilian non-governmental organization to join the United Nations Department of Public Information (DPI) in 1994. In 1999, it also became the first Brazilian NGO to gain general consultative status at the United Nations Economic and Social Council (ECOSOC). In 2000, it joined the Conference of NGOs with Consultative Relations to the United Nations (CoNGO) in Vienna, Austria.

== Religious aspect ==
The LGW is an ecumenical association, with a tendency towards popular spiritism, but not linked to it. The Temple of Good Will (Portuguese: Templo da Boa Vontade) created and built with help from the institution, was inaugurated on October 21, 1989. Not long afterwards it became the most visited monument in western Brasília, receiving more than a million pilgrims every year, according to official information.

Next to the Temple of Good Will, possibly inspired by the Bahá’í Faith, is the World Parliament of the Ecumenical Brotherhood (ParlaMundi). This was established as forum for debate for all the people and institutions in Brazil and worldwide who work for the betterment of man and his eternal Spirit. It has the Students' Hall - a place that unites human knowledge with the lights of spiritual teachings for the formation of the Ecumenical Citizen - attended annually by more than 150,000 young people.

== Structure and actions ==
In Brazil, the organization runs 83 socio-educational units, including basic education schools, vocational training schools, shelters for the elderly, Community Social Assistance Centres and Humanitarian Assistance Centres.

In the United States, one of its educational initiatives is to offer free OSHA classes with cards to low-income workers in Newark who want to increase their wages by entering the construction labor market, in partnership with eNpower.
