= Spiritism =

Spiritism may refer to:

- Espiritismo, a Latin American and Caribbean belief system that evolved and less evolved spirits can affect health, luck and other aspects of human life
- Kardecist spiritism, a reincarnationist and spiritualistic doctrine established in France in the mid-19th century by Allan Kardec
- Spiritism (book), an 1885 book by Eduard von Hartmann

== See also ==
- Spiritist centre, the basic unit of organization in Kardecist spiritism
- Spiritualism (disambiguation)
- Spirituality, a religious process of re-formation that "aims to recover the original shape of man"
