= Callista (given name) =

Name list

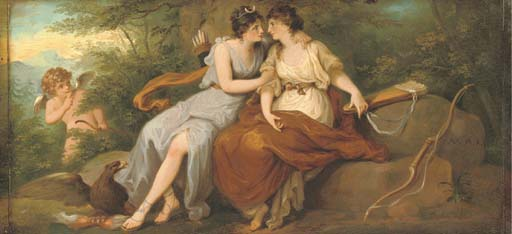
- Jupiter and Callisto by Angelica Kauffman, c. 1760s.
- Gender: Female
- Language: Greek, Late Latin

Origin
- Meaning: Greek "Most beautiful"; Late Latin: "Chalice”

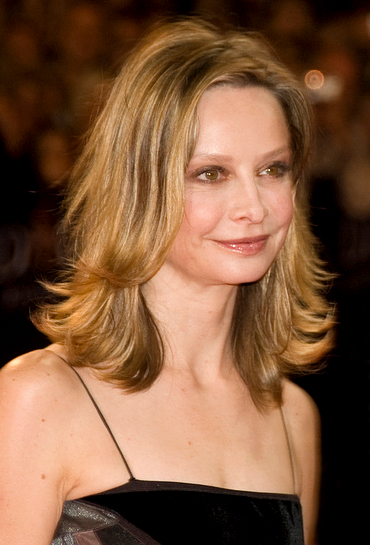
American actress Calista Flockhart in 2009.

Callista is a feminine given name derived from the Greek word καλλίστη or kallístē, meaning "fairest" or "most beautiful". In Greek mythology, Callisto was a huntress, who was loved by the god Zeus. Calista is a variant English spelling of the same Greek word. Calista is also a Late Latin name that evolved as a Spanish form of Calixta, the feminine version of the name Calixtus. Calixtus was derived from the Latin calix, meaning cup, taken from the Ancient Greek κύλιξ (kylix), meaning "chalice" and used by early Christians in reference to the cup used during the Eucharist.

Other English spellings of the name are Callistee, Callysta, Calysta, Kalista, Kallista, Kallistee, and Kalysta.

== Usage ==
The name was traditionally used most often in Bohemia, but has been in occasional use in the Anglosphere since the early 19th century. Both Callista and Calista became better known worldwide due to the fame of American actress Calista Flockhart, who portrayed the heroine of the popular American legal comedy drama television series Ally McBeal, which aired from 1997 to 2002. Flockhart was given her mother's middle name as a first name. The name Calista first appeared on popularity charts in the United States, France, and the United Kingdom in the late 1990s and early 2000s, but then declined again in use. Calista was among the top 1,000 names for girls in the United States between 1998 and 2004, was among the top 500 names for French girls between 2001 and 2005, and was among the top 1,000 names for British girls for one year, in 2001.

== Women named Callista ==
- Callista Balko (born 1986), American former college softball player
- Callista Chimombo (born 1959), Malawian politician and widow of President Bingu wa Mutharika
- Callista Clark (born 2003), American country music singer
- Callista Gingrich (née Bisek; born 1966), American diplomat, businesswoman, author, and documentary film producer
- Callista Roy (born 1939), American nun, nursing theorist, professor and author

== Women named Calista ==
- Calista Flockhart (born 1964), American actress
- Calista Cooper Hughes (1914–2004), American politician
- Calista Robinson Jones (1839-1913), nineteenth national president of the Woman's Relief Corps
- Calista V. Luther (1841–1924), American missionary and medical doctor, daughter of Calista Vinton
- Calista Halsey Patchin (1845–1920), American journalist and artist
- Calista Redmond, American business executive
- Calista Vinton (1807–1864), American Baptist missionary, mother of Calista V. Luther

== As middle name ==
- Harriet Calista Clark McCabe (1827–1919), American pioneer in women's work for temperance and home missions
- Lucy Calista Morgan (1889–1981), American weaver and teacher

== Women named Kalista ==
- Kalista Sy (born c. 1985), Senegalese screenwriter

== Women named Kallista ==
- Kallista Field (born 1978), New Zealand equestrian
- Kallista Kann (1895–1983), Estonian linguist and teacher
