= Callista =

Callista, also spelled Calista, Callistee, Kallista, Kalista and Kallistee, comes from the Greek for "most beautiful (feminine)" (καλλίστη – kallístē).

Callista may refer to:

== Nature ==
- Callista (bivalve), a genus of bivalves
- Callista Lour., a synonym of Dendrobium, an orchid genus
- Callista D.Don, a synonym of Erica, a heath or heather genus

== Entertainment ==
- A SWAT Kats: The Radical Squadron character, the presumed ancestor of Deputy Mayor Callie Briggs
- Callista (novel), 1855 novel by John Henry Newman
- Callista Ming, a character in the Star Wars Expanded Universe
- A main character from the video game The Last Story

== People ==
- Callista Balko, American athlete
- Callista Chimombo, Malawian politician
- Calista Flockhart, American actress
- Callista Gingrich, wife of Newt Gingrich
- Callista Roy, American nursing theorist

== Science ==
- 204 Kallisto, an S-type asteroid which was discovered in 1879
- Callisto (moon), one of the moons of Jupiter, discovered in 1610

== Places ==
- Kallista, Victoria, a town in Australia
- Kalista, a village in south-western Bulgaria
- Calista, Western Australia, a suburb of Perth, Australia

== Other ==
- Panther Kallista, a retro-style automobile manufactured by Panther Westwinds from 1982 to 1993
- Calista (steamboat), a small steamboat of the Puget Sound Mosquito Fleet
- RV Callista Southampton University research vessel

== See also ==
- Calista (disambiguation)
- Callisto (disambiguation)
- Calisto (disambiguation)
- Callistus (disambiguation)
