= Calista =

Calista may refer to:

- Calista, Western Australia, a suburb of Perth, Western Australia
- Calista, Kansas, a community in the United States
- Calista Corporation, an Alaska Native Regional Corporation
- Calista (group), a Filipino girl group

== People with the given name ==
- Calista Flockhart, American actress
- Calista Robinson Jones (1839-1913), nineteenth national president of the Woman's Relief Corps
- Calista Vinton (1807–1864), American Baptist missionary
- Calista Robertson, contestant on Big Brother: Celebrity Hijack

== See also ==
- Callista (disambiguation)
- Callista (given name)
