= Francis Mason (missionary) =

American missionary and naturalist

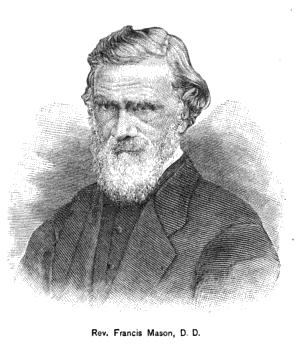
Francis Mason

Francis Mason (2 April 1799 – 3 March 1874), American missionary and a naturalist, was born in York, England. His grandfather, also Francis Mason, was the founder of the Baptist Society in York, and his father, a shoemaker by trade, was a Baptist lay preacher there.

== Early life ==
After working with his father as a shoemaker for several years, he emigrated in 1818 to the United States, and in Massachusetts was licensed to preach as a Baptist in 1827. In 1830 he was sent by the American Baptist Missionary Union to labor among the Karens in Burma.

== Burma ==
In Burma, besides conducting a training college for native preachers and teachers at Tavoy, he translated the Bible into the two principal dialects of the Karens, the Sgaw and the Pwo (his translation being published in 1853), and Matthew, Genesis, and the Psalms into the Bghai dialect. He also published A Pali Grammar on the Basis of Kachchayano, with Chrestomathy and Vocabulary (1868). In 1849, he described a new species of pine, Tenasserim Pine in the journal of the Asiatic Society. In 1850 he published a book of great value on the fauna and flora of British Burma titled The natural products of Burmah, or notes on the fauna, flora and minerals of the Tenasserim provinces, and the Burman empire. It was published by the American Mission Press at Moulmein. An improved edition appeared in 1860 under the title Burmah, its People and Natural Productions, and a third edition (2 vols.) revised and enlarged by William Theobald in 1882–1883.

== Personal life ==
He was a Freemason and briefly faced exclusion from his missionary work due to certain views held by his wife, Ellen Huntly Bullard Mason, one of them being that God's way of speaking to Adam was revealed in the designs of the Burmese women's dresses. He died at Rangoon.

See his autobiography, The Story of a Working Man's Life, with Sketches of Travel in Europe, Asia, Africa and America (New York, 1870).

== See also ==
- List of Protestant Missionaries to Southeast Asia
- Adoniram Judson
- Eugenio Kincaid
- Calista Vinton
