= Kallisto =

Kallisto may refer to:

- Kallisto (mythology), or Callisto, a nymph in Greek mythology
- 204 Kallisto, an asteroid
- HS Kallisto, a Greek warship
- kallisto, an RNA-Seq bioinformatics tool

== See also ==
- Kalisto (disambiguation)
- Callisto (disambiguation)
- Calisto (disambiguation)
