= Léon Denis =

French spiritist philosopher

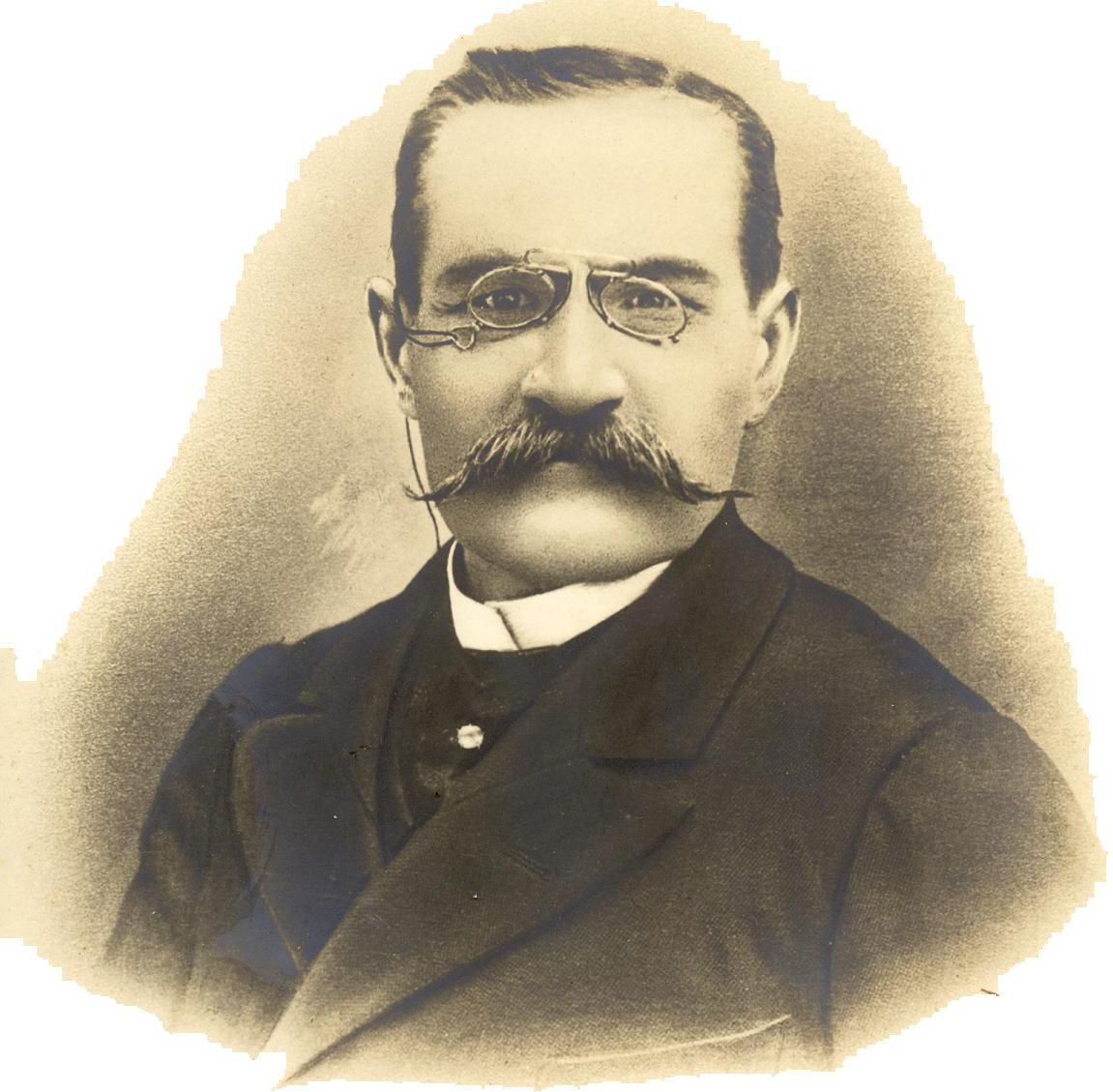
- Born: Léon Denis; January 1, 1846; Foug, Meurthe-et-Moselle, France
- Died: March 12, 1927 (aged 81)
- Known for: Léon Denis, spiritist philosopher and researcher, nominated the Apostle of Spiritism

Léon Denis (January 1, 1846 – March 12, 1927) was a notable French spiritist philosopher, and, with Gabriel Delanne and Camille Flammarion, one of the principal exponents of spiritism after the death of Allan Kardec. Denis lectured throughout Europe at international conferences of spiritism and spiritualism, promoting the idea of survival of the soul after death and the implications of this for human relations. He is known as the apostle of French spiritism.

== Biography ==
Léon Denis was born in Foug, Meurthe-et-Moselle, France, on January 1, 1846, of a humble family. Very early in life, out of necessity, he did manual work and had to bear heavy responsibilities for his family. From his first steps in the world, he sensed that invisible friends assisted him. Instead of participating in play appropriate to his youth, he tried to instruct himself as intensely as possible. He read serious works, thus striving through his own efforts, to develop his intelligence. He became a serious and competent self-didact.

At the age of 18, he commenced work as a sales representative, and so had to make frequent trips. This situation continued up to the time of his reformation and beyond. He adored music and, whenever he had a chance, attended operas or concerts. He played well-known arias at the piano and also some compositions of his own.

He did not smoke, and was almost exclusively a vegetarian, nor did he indulge in fermented drinks. He found water to be his ideal drink.

It was his habit to review books with interest, of those displayed in the bookstores, at the age of 18, by "chance" his eyes glanced at a work with an unusual title: The Spirits’ Book by Allan Kardec. Having with him the amount needed to purchase the book, he bought it and rushed to his home immediately surrendering eagerly to the reading.

Denis commented after reading it: "I found in this book the clear solution, complete and logical, to a universal problem. My conviction became strong and sound. The Spiritist Theory dissipated my indifference and my doubts."

Denis was not just a successor to Allan Kardec, as is generally supposed, but was an important figure in consolidating the spiritist movement. He undertook doctrinal studies, research into mediums, and propelled the Spiritist Movement in France, and all over the world. He deepened the moral aspects of the Doctrine and, above all, consolidated the Movement in the early decades of the 20th century.

In Spiritism, the role of Kardec is that of the sage; the role of Denis is that of the philosopher. Léon Denis was nominated the Apostle of Spiritism, due to his sustained work, and his words, written and spoken, on behalf of the new doctrine. Possessing great moral sensibility, he dedicated his entire existence to the defense of the postulates that Kardec had transmitted in the books of the spiritist Pentateuch.

Denis himself summarized his mission as follows: "I have consecrated this existence to the service of a Great cause, Spiritism or Modern Spiritualism that will certainly be the universal faith, and the religion of the future."

== See also ==
- Spiritism
- The Spirits Book
- The Book on Mediums
- The Gospel According to Spiritism
- The Genesis According to Spiritism
- Heaven and Hell

== Bibliography ==
By Denis:

- Le Pourquoi de la Vie (1885 & Librairie des Sciences Psychologiques, 1892).
- Christianisme et spiritisme (Leymarie, 1898).
- Après la mort (Librairie des sciences psychiques, 1905).
- Le probleme de l'etre et de la destinée
- Dans l'invisible, spiritisme et médiumnité (Librairie des Sciences Psychiques, 1911).
- Le Monde invisible et la guerre (Librairie des sciences psychiques, 1919).
- Jeanne d'Arc, médium.
- L'au-dela et la survivance de l'etre.
- La grande énigme, Dieu & l'univers (Librairie des sciences psychiques, 1921).
- Esprits et mediums: étude et pratique du spiritualisme experimental et de la médiumnité (1921)
- Le génie celtique et le monde invisible

Some of his works are also available in English translations.

Biography:

- Luce, Gaston. Léon Denis, l'apotre du spiritisme, sa vie, son oeuvre.
- Baumard, Claire. Léon Denis intime (J. Meyer, 1929). Preface by Arthur Conan Doyle.
