= Kalisto =

Kalisto may refer to:

- Kalisto (wrestler), the ring name of professional wrestler Emmanuel Alejandro Rodriguez
- Kalisto (warez group), a console warez group for PlayStation games
- Kalisto Entertainment, a defunct French video game development company

== See also ==
- Kallisto (disambiguation)
- Calisto (disambiguation)
- Callisto (disambiguation)
