= Marie K. Formad =

American physician (1860–1944)

- Born: October 30, 1860; Russia
- Died: February 21, 1944 (aged 83); Philadelphia, Pennsylvania, U.S.
- Resting place: West Laurel Hill Cemetery, Bala Cynwyd, Pennsylvania, U.S.
- Occupation: Physician

Marie K. Formad (October 30, 1860 – February 21, 1944) was a Russian-born, American physician who worked for 52 years at Woman's Hospital of Philadelphia as a teaching surgeon, gynecologist, and pathologist. She served as a surgeon in the French Army in World War I from 1918 to 1919 and received the Honour medal for courage and devotion from the French government for her wartime service.

== Early life and education ==
Formad was born October 30, 1860, in Russia. She moved to the United States in 1883. She graduated from the Woman's Medical College of Pennsylvania in 1886, with a thesis titled "Some Notes on Criminal Abortion".

== Career ==
Formad was elected to the post of vaccine physician for Philadelphia's Eleventh District in 1887. She worked for 52 years at Woman's Hospital of Philadelphia, as a teaching surgeon, gynecologist, and pathologist.

During World War I, Formad accepted a commission as a surgeon in the French army in 1917. She served fourteen months, from January 1918 to March 1919, in a Women's Overseas Hospital (WOH) unit in France. She directed and performed surgery at a 125-bed refugee hospital at Labouheyre, supported by the National Woman Suffrage Association, working alongside doctors Laura E. Hunt and Mabel Seagrave. The hospital grew under Formad's direction, and served about 10,000 refugees during its existence; two of the American nurses at Labouheyre, Winifred Warder and Eva Emmons, died from influenza there. After the armistice, Formad went to Nancy to work as a surgeon caring for repatriating French civilians. She received the Medaille d'honneur from the French government for her wartime service.

She was the first woman member of the Obstetrical Society of Philadelphia. With Calista V. Luther and two other women doctors, she ran an evening dispensary, the Medical Aid Society for Self-Supporting Women, to treat working women at a more convenient time than other clinics. She was a mentor to Catharine Macfarlane. She retired in 1938.

== Personal life ==
Her older brother Henry F. Formad, was a pathology professor on the faculty at the University of Pennsylvania, and served as Coroner's Physician in Philadelphia. Another brother, Robert Julius Formad, was also a pathologist, an expert on veterinary oncology.

Marie Formad cared for her older brother Henry in his last months; he died in 1892. She died February 21, 1944, in Philadelphia and was interred at West Laurel Hill Cemetery in Bala Cynwyd, Pennsylvania. She left her estate mainly to her two nieces, Marie and Charlotte.
