= Justus Vinton =

American Baptist missionary

Justus H. Vinton
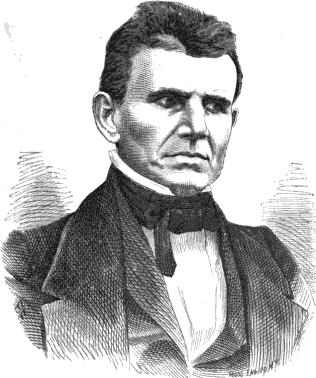
- Missionary to Burma
- Born: February 17, 1806; Willington, Connecticut, US
- Died: March 31, 1858 (aged 52); Rangoon, Burma

Justus H. Vinton (17 February 1806 – 31 March 1858) was an American Baptist missionary who worked for 25 years in Burma (now known as Myanmar) preaching the gospel amongst the Karen people.

== Early life ==
Justus Vinton was born on 17 February 1806 in Willington, Connecticut. He attended the Hamilton Literary and Theological Institution (later known as Madison University and finally as Colgate University). In 1833 the missionary to Burma, Jonathan Wade, on his medical furlough spent the year at the Institution giving instructions to the future missionaries. Among the future missionaries were Justus Vinton and Calista Holman. Jonathan Wade also brought with him two of his disciples, a Burmese named Maung Shwe Maung and a Karen named Saw Chet Thaing. Justus and Calista received Karen language lessons from Saw Chet Thaing.

Justus married Calista Holman in 1834, and three months later set sail to Burma in company with other missionaries: Mr. and Mrs. Wade, Mr. and Mrs. Howard, Mr and Mrs. Dean, and Mr. and Mrs. Osgood and the two disciples. The voyage took one hundred and sixty days, normal for the period. Justus and Calista studied the Karen language on the voyage. In addition the missionaries preached the gospel to the crew. During the voyage they converted the captain, the first officer, the steward, supercargo, and many sailors.

== Life in Moulmein ==
They disembarked in Moulmein (also known as Mawlamyine) in December 1834. Since Justus and Calista were sufficiently familiar with the language, they began their mission work at once. They took native canoes and visited many jungle Karen villages preaching the gospel and seeking to convert people to their religion.

During the monsoon (raining) season, when travelling was impossible, the Vintons were confined to the city. they learned Burmese language and Justus labored among the British soldiers in the garrison and preaching and distributing religious tracts among the Burmese. He also worked on the translation of the New Testament into Karen and wrote commentaries. Between 1834 and 1848, Justus labors were confined to Moulmein district with occasional visits to Rangoon (now known as Yangon) and Tavoy (now known as Dawei). On his frequent visits to Rangoon he baptized many people. Rangoon was still under Burmese rule at that time, but Adoniram Judson's disciple Saw Tha Byu and Rev. Abbott had converted many Karens around Rangoon and little churches had been set up. Many young Karen men travelled on foot to Moulmein through the forest to go to the school established by Calista Vinton. There they learned to read in the written form of their language that the missionaries had developed.

In 1841, 22-year-old Justus's sister Miranda joined them for mission work and worked as a teacher. The Vintons had a son, Brainerd, and a daughter, Calista. A third child, Harvey Howard, died before his first birthday.

== Sojourn in America ==
In 1847 Mrs. Vinton's health failed and she returned to America for treatment. Justus visited the Baptist churches in almost all the states and raised funds for the indebted Baptist Missionary Union. In July 1850 the Vintons returned by sea to Burma, accompanied by many missionaries, including Jonathan Wade and Eugenio Kincaid and their wives.

== Call to Rangoon ==
In 1852 a British frigate and four armed steamers arrived at the port of Rangoon to demand redress of grievances from the Burmese government. The local authorities prepared for resistance by erecting immense stockades and placing batteries at various points. Reinforcements called from surrounding areas maltreated the populace.

Rev. Eugenio Kincaid, who was in Rangoon at that time, asked Justus to come to Rangoon and help with relief work. The fellow missionaries at Moulmein also agreed that he should go. Justus went to Rangoon at once; waiting for a formal authorization of his transfer from the Baptist Mission Union would have required six to eight months. When he reached Rangoon five thousand refugee Karens were living in precarious conditions. Rangoon fell to the British on 12 April 1852 in the Second Anglo-Burmese War, but elements of the disbanded local army continued to harass the people. Six weeks after the capture of Rangoon, Justus Vinton's family joined him in Rangoon. They set up an emergency hospital in a vacant monastery. Calista also set up a school, and two hundred pupils attended.

Famine followed the war and pestilence. Justus Vinton bought provisions and fed thousands of refugees.

In 1854 Karen Home Mission Society was formed. At their first annual meeting, thirty pastors and three hundred lay delegates were in attendance. In 1855 a two-storey Karen Baptist church was built, and the Vinton's son Brainerd went to study at Hamilton, NY and the daughter Calista went to study at Suffolk. Miranda, who had married Rev. Norman Harris, died in 1856.

The Baptist Mission Union censured Justus Vinton for abandoning his post without authorization and going to Rangoon; he resigned from the Missionary Union and accepted, unpaid, the affiliation of American Baptist Free Mission Society. The Society acted as a financial agent in the collection and transmission of funds and in publication in the country of his reports and letters. Besides funds donated by friends in America, his mission was supported by native Christians and British residents in Rangoon.

In 1858 Justus went to Shwekyin to find appropriate locations for posting native preachers; he contracted a jungle fever there, and died on 31 March 1858. Calista carried on the mission work, assisted by her son Brainerd and daughter Calista and their spouses, who returned from America after their studies. By this time Brainerd had married Julia A. Haswell, daughter of Rev. James Madison Haswell of the Burmese Mission in Moulmein.

In 1872, long after the death of Justus Vinton, he was finally vindicated by the Baptist Missionary Union and Brainerd rejoined the church.

Several of his children and great-grandchildren continued missionary work in Burma, including the surgeon Gordon Seagrave.

== Gallery ==
List of Protestant Missionaries to Southeast Asia
