= Balko (disambiguation) =

Balko is a German TV detective series.

Balko may also refer to:

- Balko, Oklahoma, US
- Radley Balko (born 1975), American libertarian journalist
- Callista Balko (born 1986), softball player
