= Mabel Seagrave =

American physician, American suffragist

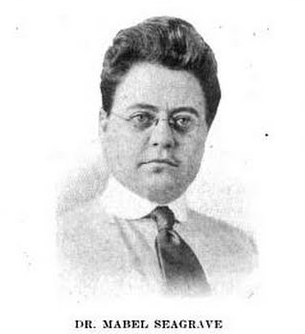
- Mabel Seagrave in 1919
- Born: Mabel Alexandria Seagrave; January 3, 1882; Cheyenne, Wyoming Territory
- Died: November 10, 1935 (aged 53); Seattle, Washington
- Education: Wellesley College; Johns Hopkins School of Medicine
- Occupation: Physician
- Parent(s): Arthur Amasa Seagrave; Selina Stone Glass Seagrave

Mabel Alexandria Seagrave (January 3, 1882 – November 10, 1935) was an American medical doctor who was sent to France by the National American Woman Suffrage Association to staff a refugee hospital during World War I. Dr. Seagrave stayed on after the end of the war to lead a Red Cross hospital as well as to perform operations at another hospital 40 miles away. France awarded Seagrave the silver Médaille d’honneur as a token of gratitude.

== Early life and education ==
Seagrave was born in Cheyenne, Wyoming Territory the daughter of Arthur Amasa Seagrave and Selina Stone Glass Seagrave. Selina Seagrave died at age 38 when Mabel was age 4. The next year, the family moved to Seattle, Washington Territory. While in Seattle, Mabel's father married a woman named Sarah Chatham. Her father built and operated hotels in Seattle where the Seagrave family lived. Seagrave graduated as valedictorian from Seattle High School in 1900.

Seagrave attended Wellesley College, graduating in 1905. At Wellesley, Seagrave excelled in math, biology, and chemistry. She was a literary editor of the College News, treasurer of the executive board of Student Government, and she helped secure the championship for her class in the college’s 1902 Field Day by winning the low-hurdles event.

After graduating from Wellesley, Seagrave taught math at a Seattle high school for two years. Seagrave enrolled in Johns Hopkins School of Medicine in 1907. She graduated as one of seven women in the 89 member Class of 1911.

== Career ==
After graduating from medical school, Seagrave spent 18 months as the house physician at the New York Infirmary for Women and Children before returning to Seattle. Back in Seattle, Seagrave focused on oral surgery, especially in children, at the Municipal Clinic of Seattle.

=== World War I ===
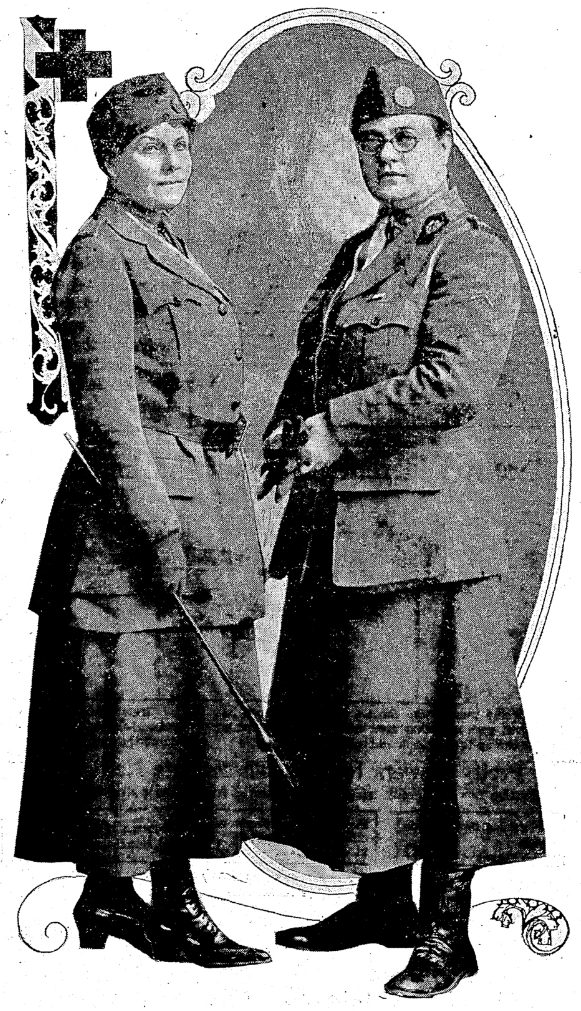
Dr Mabel Seagrave (right) and Florence Denny Heliker in World War I

In 1918, Seagrave and her Wellesley friend, Florence Denny Heliker, were sent to France by the National American Woman Suffrage Association. Both women were ardent suffragists. Seagrave joined the staff of Women's Oversea Hospitals and was first posted to a refugee hospital in the south of France.

The Women’s Oversea Hospitals, U.S.A., which sent 78 female physicians to Europe during the war, saved countless lives, Seagrave told The Seattle Daily Times when she arrived back home in 1919. “Not a man in the outfit,” she said of the hospital where she and Heliker worked 18-hour days. “Indeed, we scarcely saw men at all at first. All the French males were at war, save a few tottering graybeards. We had to do all our own heavy work … including making coffins. Our plumber was a former New York actress. Our carpenter was just out of a fashionable girls' school. Our chauffeurs were all girls.”

Seagrave jumped at the chance to enhance her skills in a battlefield setting. Surgeons would be confronted with “unusual wounds” and split-second decisions, she enthused, adding, "Just to see such cavities opened up will give the surgeon a chance to demonstrate things which heretofore have been more or less experimental. Experience gained now is going to make it possible to introduce great alleviations of suffering to the race. Military surgery in France today is of the greatest educational value, and an opportunity all surgeons must covet."

After the Armistice of 11 November 1918, Seagrave worked at a Red Cross hospital at Foug, in northeastern France—the Western Front during the war. In addition, Seagrave headed the Hopital Jeanne D'Arc at Nancy, France. Typhoid and dysentery were rampant and the flu was more deadly than war. More American Doughboys died from diseases, primarily the flu, than were killed in combat.

Seagrave was presented with a Médaille d’honneur from the French government in 1919.

=== After World War I ===
After the war, Seagrave concentrated on obstetric and gynecological surgery. She was elected to the American College of Surgeons in 1928. Her patients, especially children, loved her "gentle, reassuring smile." The King County Medical Bulletin reported "a little chat with her was to get a sunnier slant on life." At the time of her death in 1935, she was Chief of Staff at Seattle General Hospital.

== Personal life ==
Never married, Seagrave shared her home with her father, who died at the age 85 in 1927. “For a year I tried to go on living at my old home, but it was too lonesome,” she told the Johns Hopkins alumni bulletin. She rented out the house and moved in with a dear friend from Wellesley’s Class of 1909, Willye Anderson White, the widow of a prominent Seattle financier. Seagrave became an honorary aunt to her friend’s three children—Fred, 18, Horace, 16, and 9-year-old Willye Jr. She was active in the Women's Overseas Service League and the Women's University Club of Seattle.

Seagrave died suddenly from cerebral hemorrhage in 1935, aged 53 years, at her home in Seattle. In a letter to their Wellesley friends, Willye White wrote that Seagrave gave away more money than anyone knew. “She was always putting some youngster through college and I suppose never turned down anyone who asked for help. That’s who she was.” Seagrave's papers are archived at the University of Washington Libraries.
