= Callisto =

Callisto most commonly refers to:

- Callisto (mythology), a nymph
- Callisto (moon), a moon of Jupiter

Callisto may also refer to:

== Art and entertainment ==
- Callisto series, a sequence of novels by Lin Carter
- Callisto, a novel by Torsten Krol
- Callisto (comics), a fictional mutant in X-Men
- Callisto (Xena), a character on Xena: Warrior Princess
  - "Callisto" (Xena: Warrior Princess episode)
- Callisto family, a fictional family in the Miles from Tomorrowland TV series
- Callisto, a toy in the Mattel Major Matt Mason series
- Callisto (band), a band from Turku, Finland

== People with the name ==
- Callisto Cosulich (1922–2015), Italian film critic, author, journalist and screenwriter
- Callisto Pasuwa, Zimbabwean soccer coach
- Callisto Piazza (1500–1561), Italian painter

== Other uses ==
- Callisto (moth), a genus of moths in the family Gracillariidae
- CALLISTO, a reusable test rocket
- Callisto Corporation, a software development company
- Callisto, a release of version 3.2 of Eclipse
- Callisto, an AMD Phenom II processor core
- Callisto (organization), a non-profit organization

== See also ==
- Calisto (disambiguation)
- Kallisto (disambiguation)
- Callista (disambiguation)
- Callistus (disambiguation)
- Castillo (disambiguation)
