= Calixte =

Calixte is a surname and unisex given name of French-origin, from the Latin Callistus. People with the name include:

== Surname ==
- Démosthènes Pétrus Calixte, Haitian politician and military leader
- Marc Calixte, Canadian gridiron football player
- Orlando Calixte, Dominican baseball player
- Widlin Calixte, Haitian footballer

== Given name ==
- Calixthe Beyala, Cameroonian novelist
- Calixte Dakpogan, Beninese sculptor
- Calixte Delmas, French wrestler and rugby player
- Calixte Duguay, Canadian artist
- Joseph Arthur Calixte Éthier, Canadian politician
- Calixte Ganongo, Congolese politician
- Calixa Lavallée, Canadian-American composer best known for composing O Canada, the national anthem of Canada
- Pierre-Calixte Neault, Canadian politician
- Calixte "Charles" Payot, French ice hockey player
- Calixte Savoie, Canadian businessman and politician
- Henri Serrur, French painter who often signed his paintings Calixte
- Calixte Zagré, Burkinabè football manager and coach

== See also ==
- Callistus (disambiguation) (also includes Calistus, Callixtus, Calixtus and Kallistos)
