= Calista, Kansas =

Unincorporated community in Kingman County, Kansas

Coordinates: 37°38′23″N 98°16′57″W

Calista is an unincorporated community in Kingman County, Kansas, United States. It was named from the Greek Callista, meaning "most beautiful".

== History ==
Calista became a community in 1886 after the community of Maud (1881–1886) was moved there. This original community known as "Old Calista" lasted until 1896 when the community had to be moved to make way for the Atchison, Topeka and Santa Fe Railway. "New" Calista was founded about two miles west-southwest of "Old" Calista and was a town until 1955. Now Calista only has a few buildings remaining and a small grain elevator open for about two weeks a year during the wheat harvest.

== Geography ==
Calista is located in southern Kansas about nine miles west of the city of Kingman and is near the south bank of the Ninnescah River.

== Education ==
The community is served by Kingman–Norwich USD 331 public school district.

== Transportation ==
The Atchison, Topeka and Santa Fe Railway formerly provided passenger rail service to Calista on a line between Wichita and Pratt. Dedicated passenger service was provided until at least 1926, while mixed trains continued until at least 1961. As of 2025, the nearest passenger rail station is located in Hutchinson, where Amtrak's Southwest Chief stops once daily on a route from Chicago to Los Angeles.
