= List of Protestant missionaries to Southeast Asia =

This gallery is intended to facilitate searching for Protestant missionaries to Southeast Asia.

== Burma (Myanmar) ==
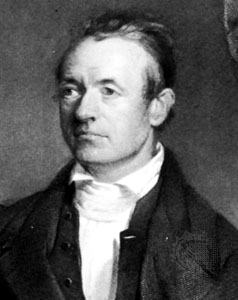
Adoniram Judson

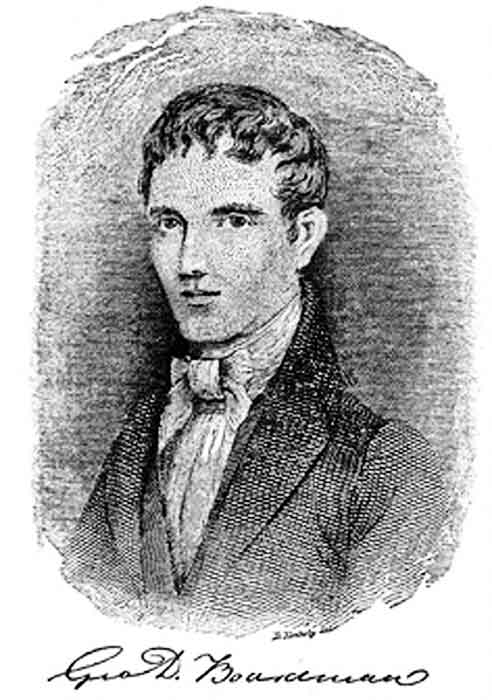
George Boardman

Ann Hasseltine Judson

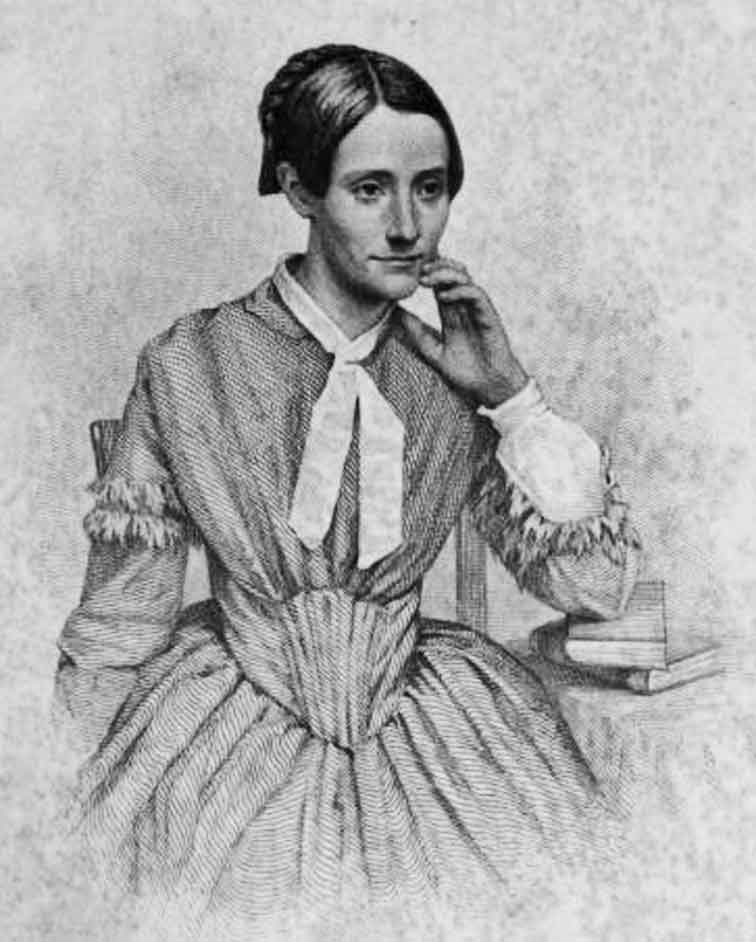
Emily Chubbuck

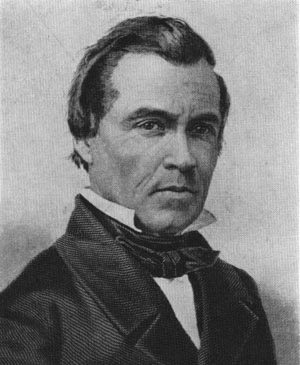
Eugenio Kincaid

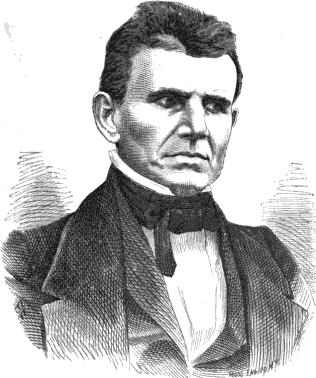
Justus Vinton

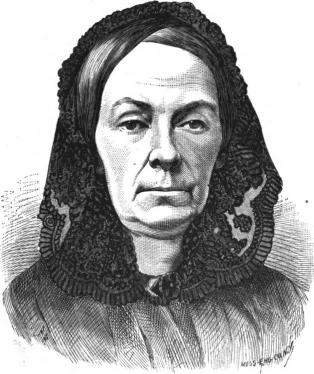
Calista Vinton

== Siam (Thailand) ==
Eliza Grew Jones

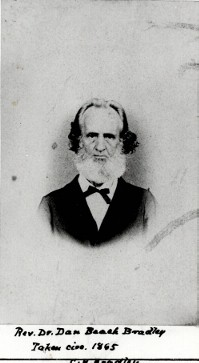
Dan Beach Bradley

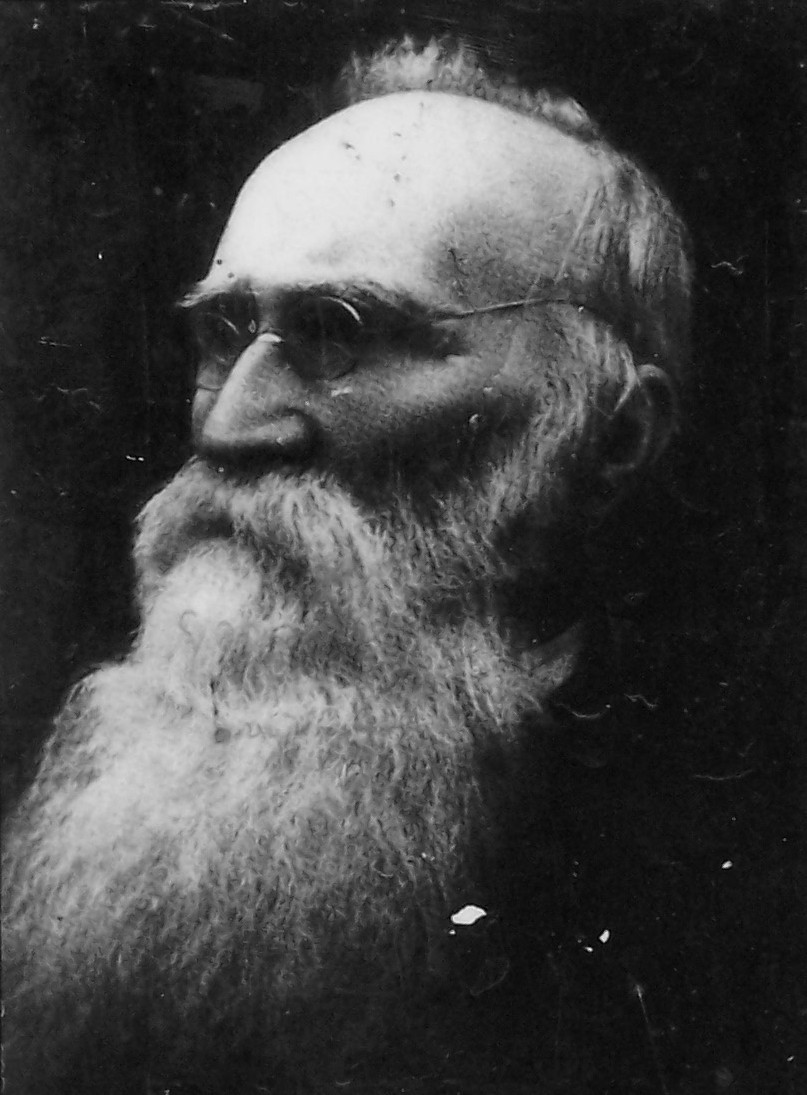
Daniel McGilvary

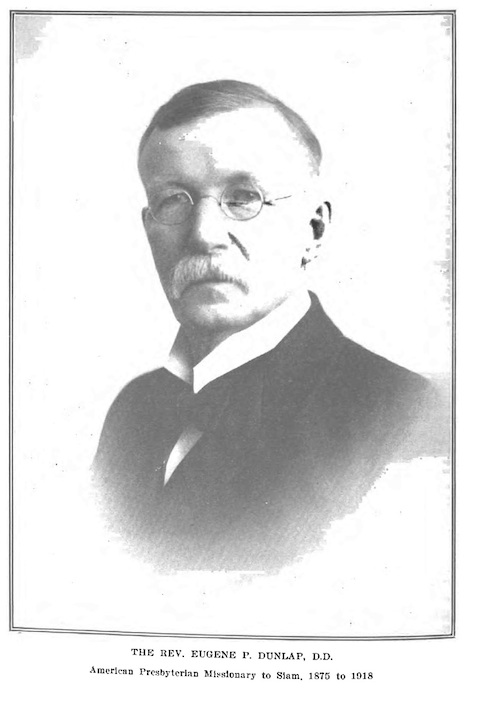
Eugene P. Dunlap

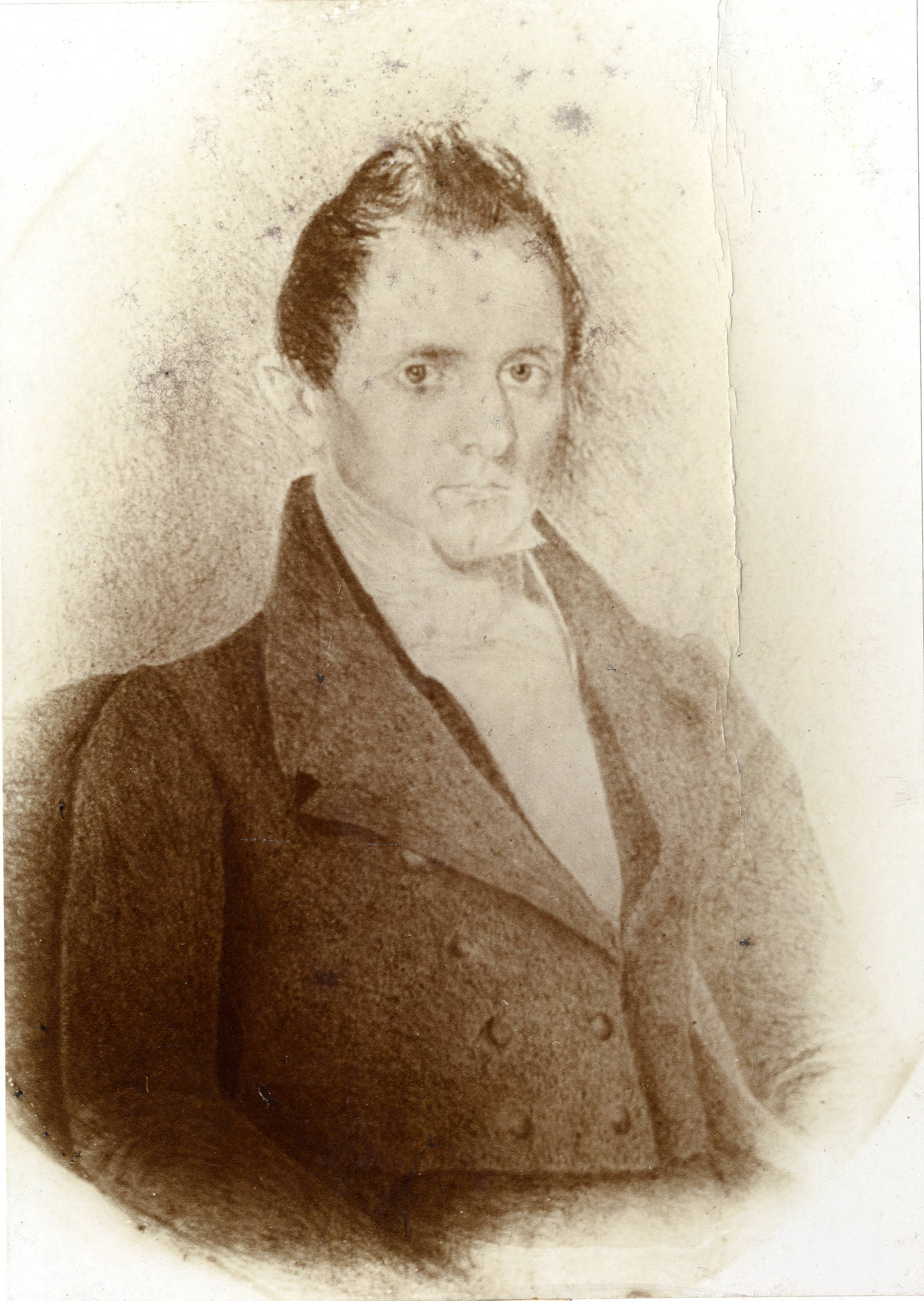
Jesse Caswell

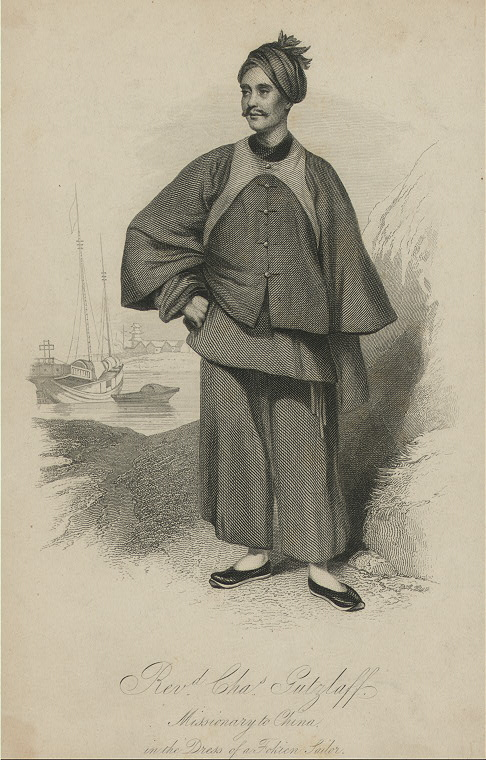
Karl Gützlaff

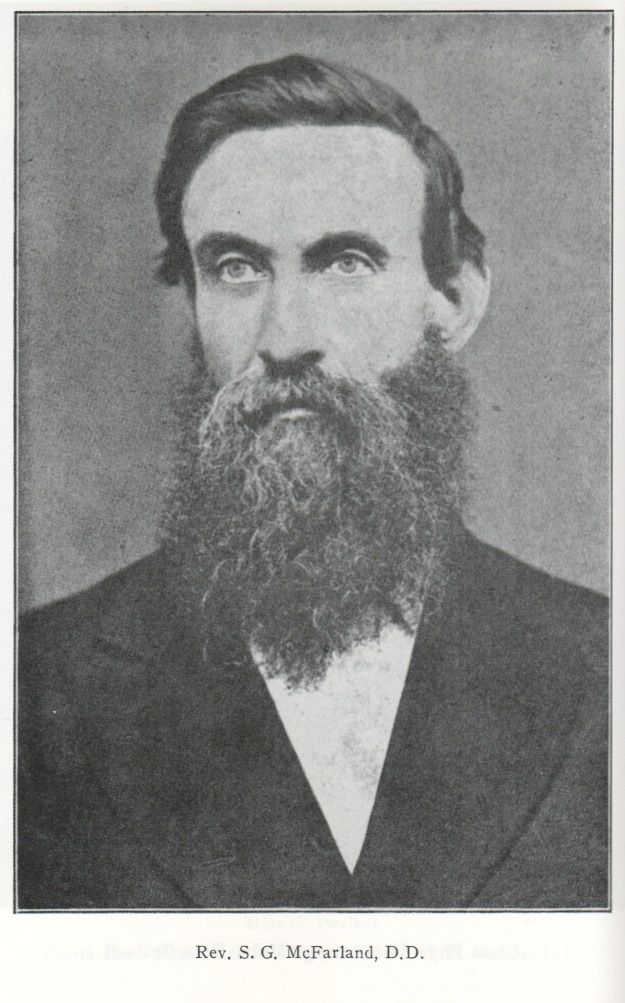
Samuel Gamble McFarland

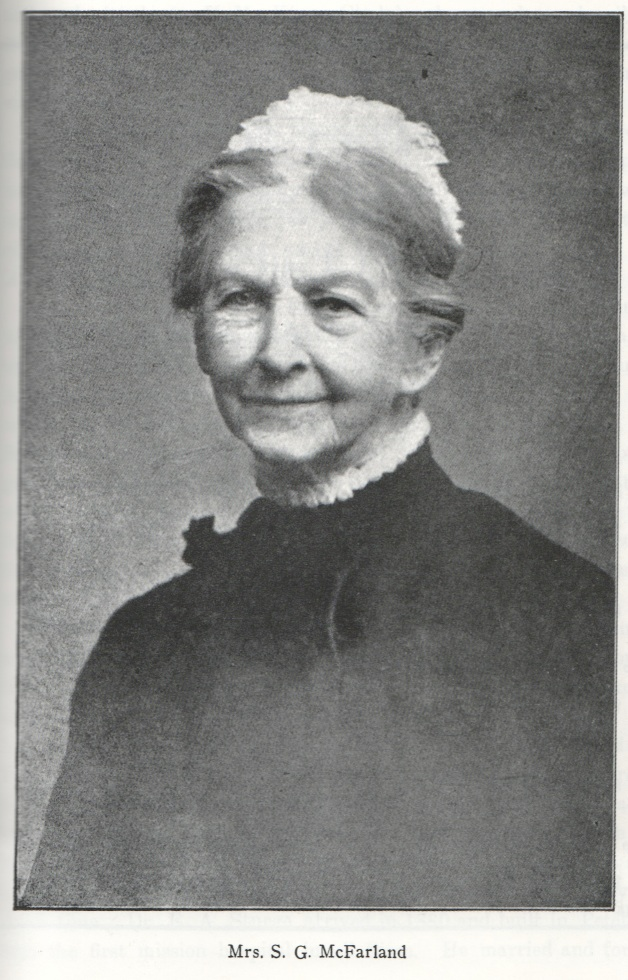
Mrs. Samuel Gamble McFarland

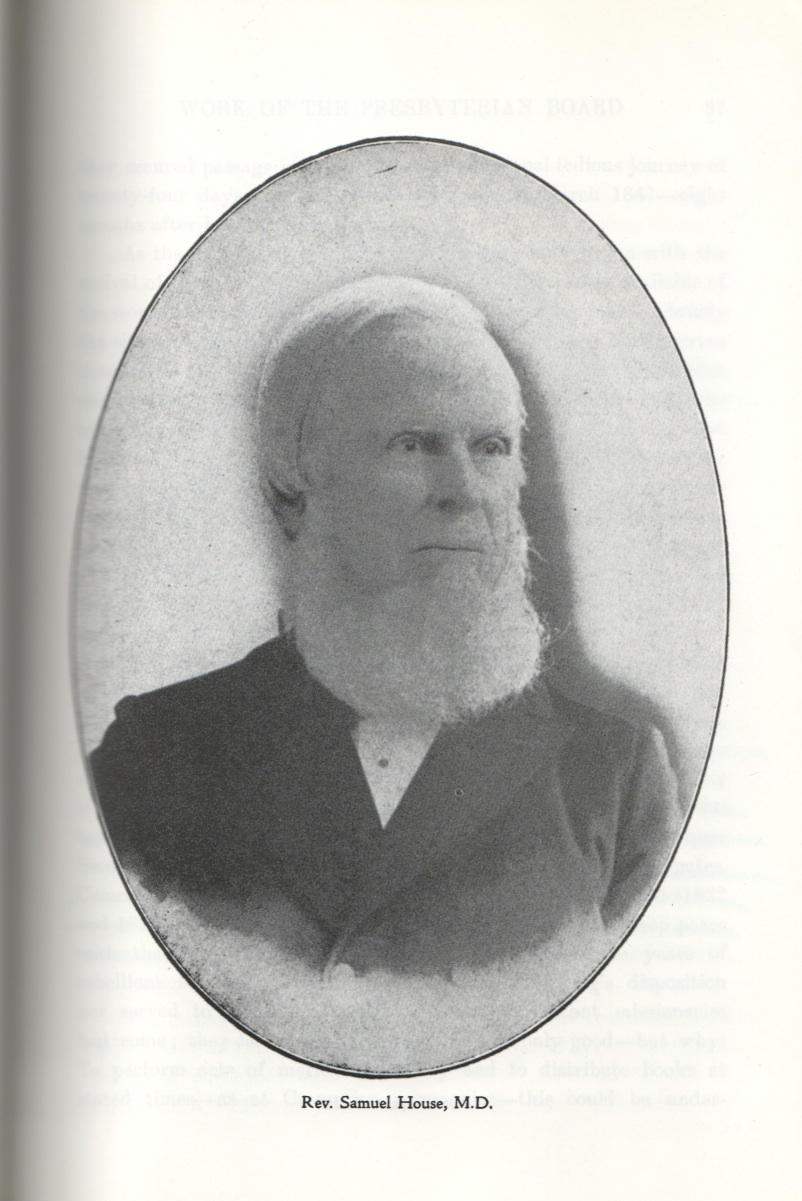
Samuel Reynolds House

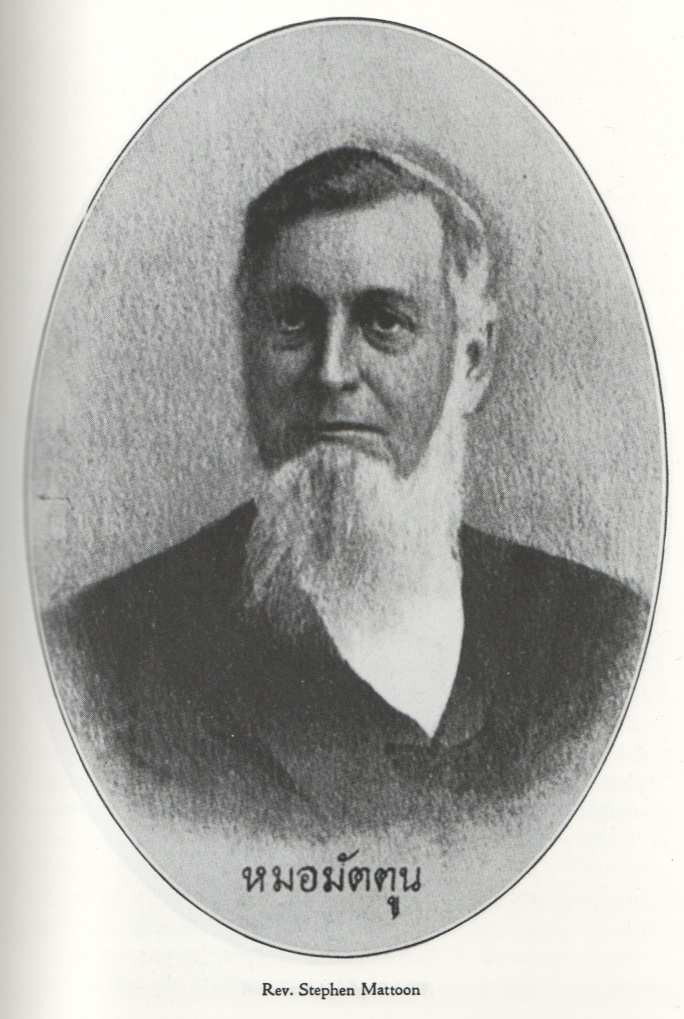
Stephen Mattoon

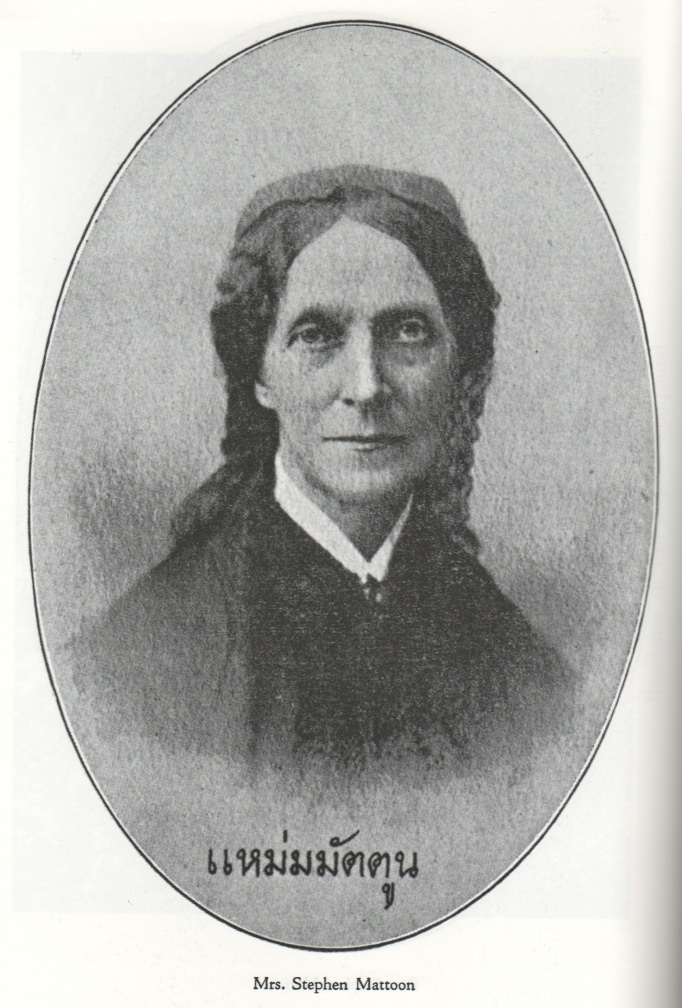
Mrs. Stephen Mattoon
