= Gordon Seagrave =

Gordon Stifler Seagrave (18 March 1897 – 28 March 1965) was a Burmese-born American missionary, physician and author.

== Life and career ==
Born in Rangoon, he was the son of American Baptist missionaries Rev. Albert Ernest Seagrave and Alice Vinton. As such he represented the fourth generation of a mission tradition begun when his great-grandparents Justus Vinton, Calista Holman, James Madison Haswell and Jane Mason, were sent to Moulmain, Burma in 1834 and 1835 to establish a Baptist mission, work continued in subsequent generations by several family members, including his great-aunt, missionary and physician Calista Vinton Luther. Seagrave's sisters followed in the family footsteps, with Rachel working as a teaching missionary in Pegu and Grace becoming a medical missionary in Moulmein. Seagrave also followed their path and became a missionary and medical doctor in Burma. He was sometimes referred to by the title of his book, "Burma Surgeon", or as Gordon Surgeon Seagrave. His first language as a boy was Karen.

Seagrave was married on 11 September 1920 to Marion Grace "Tiny" Morse. They had four children: Leslie Mae, b. 1921 in Baltimore, MD; Weston M.; John H.; and Sterling V., a journalist and author.

Seagrave graduated from Denison University in 1917 and Johns Hopkins University in 1921. He practiced medicine and surgery on the China border of Burma for nearly 20 years. He joined the US Army Medical Corps in 1942, worked with Gen. Joseph Stilwell and served with the Chinese New 6th Army through the Burma Campaign in the China-Burma-India Theater. He helped Stilwell's walking retreat into India in 1942. He walked back in to work in 1945. He served as chief medical officer for the Shan States of Burma with the British military government from 1945-46.

He was arrested and charged with treason by the newly independent Burmese government in 1950. He chose to stand trial rather than be perceived as fleeing. He was sentenced in January 1951 to six years at hard labor, on charges that he wrote a letter that helped Karen rebels arrest a government commissioner, and that he gave medical help to the Karen rebels. The sentence was later reduced to six months, and in November 1951 the verdict was overturned by Burma's three-man Supreme Court and he was declared not guilty. He suffered dysentery and malaria in part from his time in jail.

Seagrave wrote six books: Waste Basket Surgery, 1930; Tales of a Waste Basket Surgeon, 1939/1942; Burma Surgeon, 1943; Adventure in Burma told in pictures, 1944; Burma Surgeon Returns, 1946; and My Hospital in the Hills, 1955; and he co-authored The life of a Burma Surgeon with Chester Bowles, 1961.

Gordon Seagrave died at his hospital at Namhkam, Burma on 28 March 1965.
