= Laneuveville-derrière-Foug =

- Commune
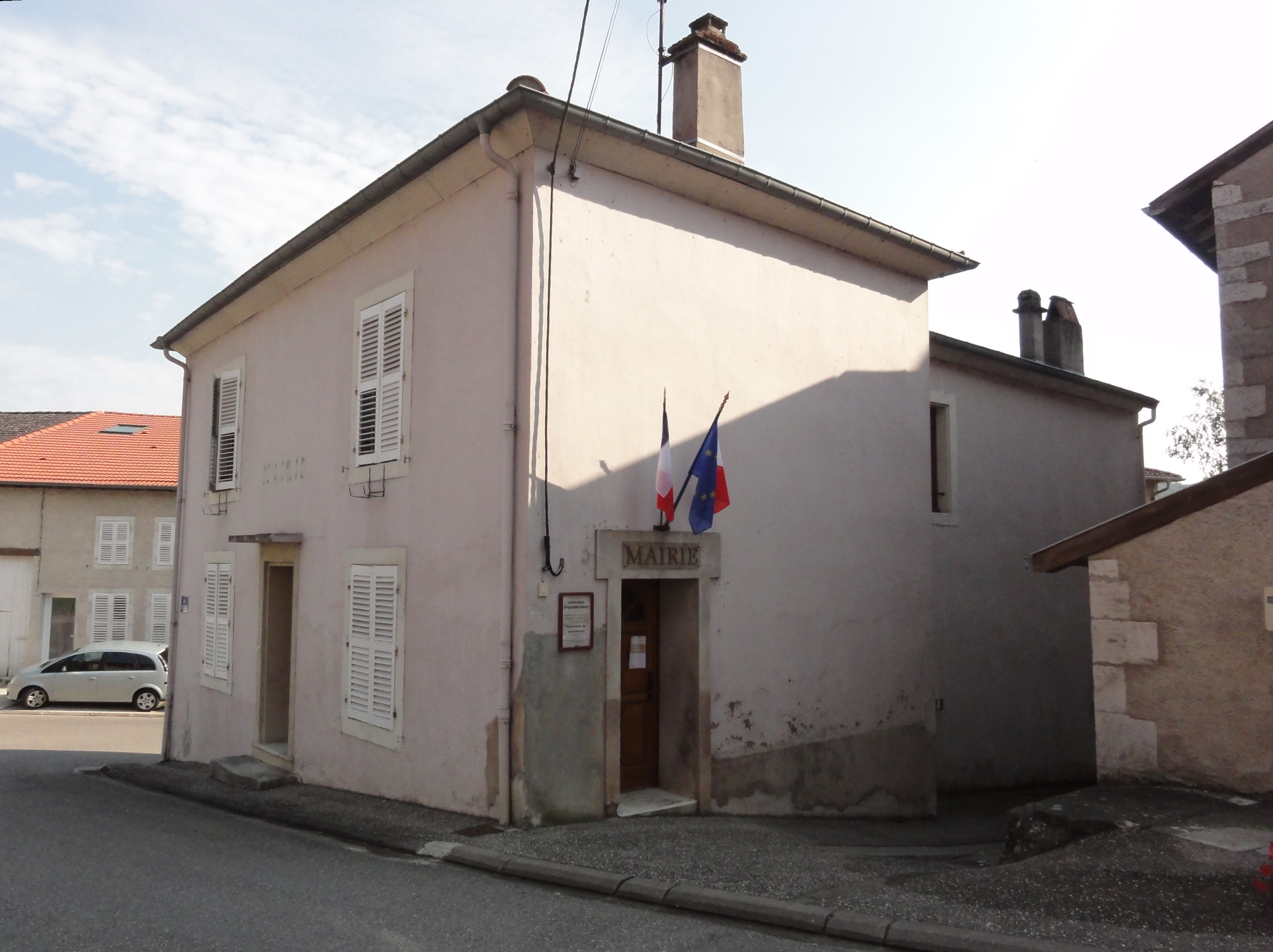
- The town hall in Laneuveville-derrière-Foug

- Coat of arms
- Location of Laneuveville-derrière-Foug
- Location within France Location within Grand Est
- Coordinates: 48°42′38″N 5°48′19″E
- Country: France
- Region: Grand Est
- Department: Meurthe-et-Moselle
- Arrondissement: Toul
- Canton: Toul

Government
  - Mayor (2020–2026): Roger Joubert
- Area^{1}: 1.13 km^{2} (0.44 sq mi)
- Elevation: 250 m (820 ft)
- Highest elevation: 366 m (1,201 ft)
- Lowest elevation: 267 m (876 ft)
- Population (2023): 155
  - Density: 137/km^{2} (355/sq mi)
- Time zone: UTC+01:00 (CET)
  - Summer (DST): UTC+02:00 (CEST)
- INSEE/Postal code: 54298 /54570
- ^{1} French Land Register data, which excludes lakes, ponds, glaciers > 1 km^{2} (0.386 sq mi or 247 acres) and river estuaries.

Laneuveville-derrière-Foug (French pronunciation: [lanœv.vil dɛʁjɛʁ fu], literally Laneuveville behind Foug) is a commune in the Meurthe-et-Moselle department in north-eastern France.

== See also ==
- Communes of the Meurthe-et-Moselle department
- Parc naturel régional de Lorraine
