= Burma Surgeon =

Biography by Gordon S. Seagrave

- Title page for Burma Surgeon (1944)
- Author: Gordon S. Seagrave
- Language: English
- Genre: Non-fiction
- Publisher: W. W. Norton & Company
- Publication date: 1943

Burma Surgeon is a biographical account by physician Gordon S. Seagrave who narrates his twenty years of experience in war-torn Burma. It was published by W. W. Norton & Company in 1943. Seagrave did not leave the country when he had a chance since he realized that the region was dependent on him for healthcare. He was later charged for treason when the rebel group by Kachin Lieutenant Naw Seng came into power. Burma Surgeons was his third book. He later also published another book Burma surgeon returns.

== Critical reception ==
Jean C. Sabine reviewed the book positively in Bulletin of the History of Medicine, calling it a "vigorous, chatty account" of Seagrave's decades-long experience.

== Sequel and adaptation ==
A sequel book, Burma Surgeon Returns, was published by W. W. Norton & Company in 1946. The book was also adapted to a podcast titled The Cavalcade of America: "Burma Surgeon" by Milton Wayne and Robert Richard in 2013.
