= Kalista =

Kalista may refer to:

- Kališta, village in the municipality of Struga, North Macedonia
- Kalista from a team of extraterrestrial superheroes Omega Men
- Kalista Sy, Senegalese screenwriter
- Zdeněk Kalista, Czech historian, poet, literary critic, editor and translator
