= Eugene P. Dunlap =

American Presbyterian missionary to Siam (1848 – 1918)

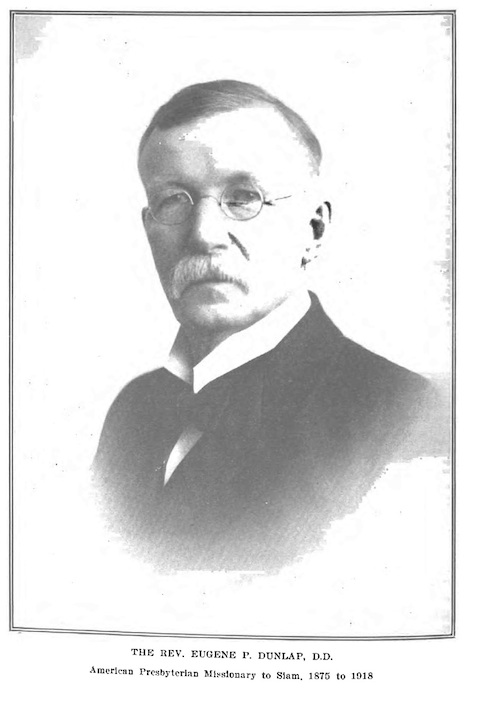
- Born: 8 June 1848; New Castle, Pennsylvania
- Died: 29 March 1918 (aged 69); Trang, Thailand
- Occupation: Missionary
- Years active: 1875 to 1918
- Organization: Presbyterian Board of Foreign Missions, U.S.A.
- Known for: Missionary work in Siam
- Spouse: Mrs. E. P. Dunlap
- Children: 6

Eugene P. Dunlap (8 June 1848 – 29 March 1918) was an American Presbyterian missionary who worked in Siam (now Thailand) from 1875 to 1918. He and his wife contributed to the spread of Protestantism in the country, and assisted in the implementation of reforms in health and education.

== Biography ==
Eugene P. Dunlap was born on 8 June 1848 in New Castle, Pennsylvania. He graduated from Westminster College in 1871 and from Western Theological Seminary in 1874, and was then appointed a missionary by the Presbyterian Board of Foreign Missions.

He and his wife arrived in Bangkok to commence missionary work in Siam on 19 October 1875. On 31 October, he was admitted as a member to the Presbytery of Siam, and was posted to Samray, Bangkok, taking over the work of Rev. McDonald.

Rather than work at the mission station, Dunlap and his wife preferred to spend most of their time travelling throughout the country meeting people and promoting the Christian faith, and offering care and medical treatment to the poor and sick, often spending 11 months of the year on their tours.

After establishing a mission in Phuket in 1910, he settled in Tap Teang (now Trang). There he formed a close relationship with Phya Rasada, the High Commissioner of Phuket, and worked with him on reforms to health and rural education in the area. When seriously ill, Dunlap saved his life and Phya Rasada responded by building a hospital. In education, he was appointed Special Commissioner of Public Schools and played an important role in the opening of new schools and improving the school system. Whilst visiting prisons he advised on the introduction of various measures to protect the health of inmates.

In 1913, he founded the first church in the region after the government donated land for the purpose, and was instrumental in obtaining official recognition for the first time that churches were legally permitted to purchase and hold land.

In 1916, his health began to deteriorate and he died at Trang on 29 March 1918 leaving a widow and five children.
