= Calisto =

Calisto may refer to:

- Calisto (butterfly), a genus of butterflies in the family Nymphalidae
- Calisto MT, an old style serif typeface
- La Calisto, an opera by Francesco Cavalli about the mythological character Callisto

== People ==
- Calisto Tanzi, an Italian businessman and embezzler
- Henrique Calisto, coach of the Vietnam national football team
- Calisto (footballer) (born 1975), Orlando Calisto de Souza, Brazilian footballer
- Zak Calisto (born 1966/1967), South African billionaire businessman

== See also ==
- Callisto (disambiguation)
- Kalisto (disambiguation)
