= Honour medal for courage and devotion =

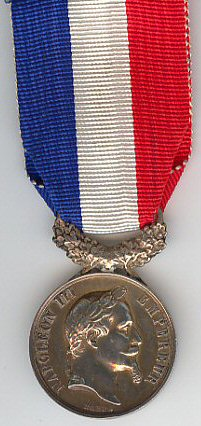
- Honour medal for courage and devotion in silver 2nd Empire (obverse)
- Type: Decoration
- Awarded for: Act of courage and devotion
- Presented by: France
- Eligibility: Military and civilians
- Status: Currently awarded
- Established: 2 March 1820

Precedence
- Next (higher): Médaille d'honneur des personnels civils relevant du ministère de la défense
- Next (lower): Médaille d'honneur du service de santé des armées

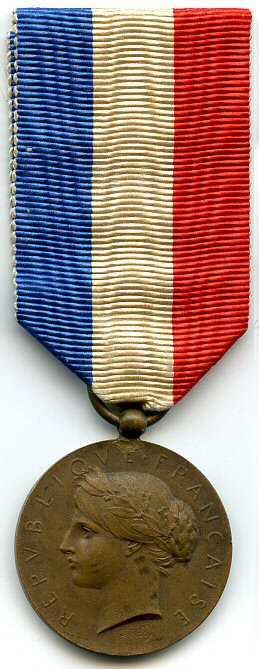
Bronze level 3rd Republic variant between 1871 and 1899

The Honour medal for courage and devotion (French: Médaille d’honneur pour acte de courage et de dévouement) is a French decoration than can be bestowed to individuals and whole units. It is awarded for acts of courage during a rescue. The Honour medal for courage and devotion was created on 2 March 1820 by King Louis XVIII. It has gone through several designs during its long history. The award was given its present name by a decree of 16 November 1901.

== Award statute ==
Any person who risks his or her life to come to the rescue of one or many persons in danger, may be recognized with the medal. When the act of rescue does not warrant award of the medal, a letter of congratulations for a successful rescue or an honorable mention for a recognized meritorious act in the form of an official certificate type scroll may be granted.

The Honour medal for courage and devotion is divided into five grades:

- Bronze (French: Bronze)
- Silver 2nd class (French: Argent de 2ème classe)
- Silver 1st class (French: Argent de 1ère classe)
- Silver-gilt (French: Vermeil)
- Gold (French: Or)

Bronze grade: awarded if the rescuer exposed himself or herself to a life-threatening condition, or to lesser risk if previously awarded a letter of congratulations and an honorable mention.

Silver grades 1st and 2nd class: awarded only if previously awarded the bronze grade following a new act of courage during a rescue. The two grades are awarded for successive acts of courage.

Silver-gilt grade: awarded only for the most intrepid acts to the bearer of two silver grade medals.

Gold grade: awarded as an outstanding testimony to a person having distinguished himself or herself through exceptional acts towards his or her fellow citizens.

The Honour medal for courage and devotion may also be collectively awarded to emergency and rescue units where the personnel present during the rewarded acts may wear a tricolour (blue-white-red) fourragère.

== Award description ==
The design of the Honour medal for courage and devotion changed many times through the decades. It is now a 27mm in diameter circular medal struck in bronze, silver, silver-gilt or gold. Its obverse bears the relief image of a standing woman holding palms and crowns surrounded by scenes of rescues under the relief inscription "DÉVOUEMENT" (English: "DEVOTION"). The reverse bears along its upper circumference, the relief inscription "RÉPUBLIQUE FRANÇAISE" (English: "FRENCH REPUBLIC"), at its center, the inscription "MINISTÈRE DE L'INTÉRIEUR" (English: "INTERIOR MINISTRY") over a framed rectangular area destined to receive the name of the recipient and year of the award.

The medal hangs from a 3 cm wide silk moiré tricolour ribbon of equal width blue, white and red vertical stripes. The 3 cm wide and 22mm high ribbon suspension loop is cast as an integral part of the medal in the form of oak leaves. The leaves of the suspension loop change colour depending on the grade of the award, bronze for the bronze grade, silver for the silver grade second class, silver-gilt for the silver grade first class and silver-gilt grade, and gold for the gold grade.

Different devices may be worn on the service ribbon to denote the grade of the award when only the ribbons are worn. A plain ribbon is worn for the bronze grade, the silver grade second class is denoted by the addition of a silver five pointed star, a silver and a silver-gilt star for the silver grade first class, a silver-gilt star for the silver-gilt grade and a rosette for the gold grade.

Gold grade obverse & ribbon	Silver-gilt grade obverse & ribbon	Silver grade 1st cl. obverse & ribbon	Silver grade 2nd cl. obverse & ribbon	Bronze grade obverse & ribbon	Common reverse to all grades

== Noteworthy recipients (partial list) ==
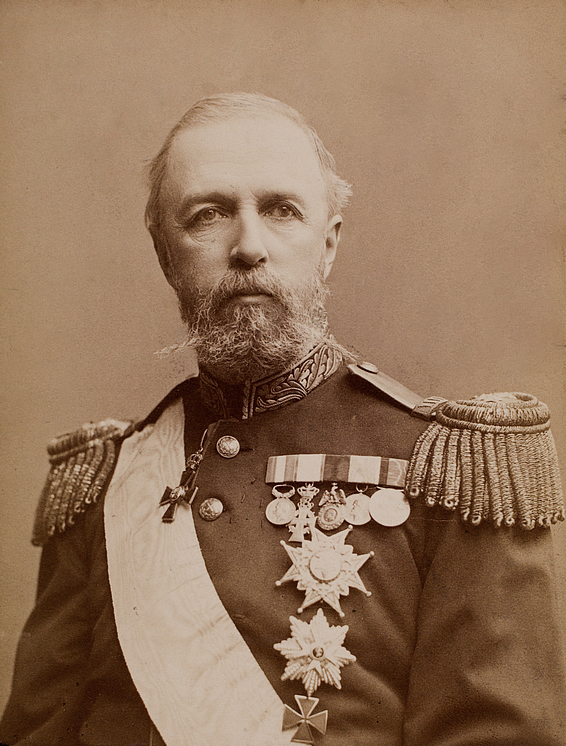
King Oscar II of Sweden-Norway with the medal on his breast.

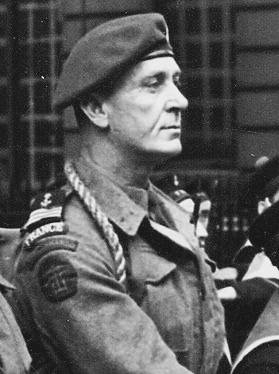
Philippe Kieffer, a recipient of the Honour medal for courage and devotion, bronze grade

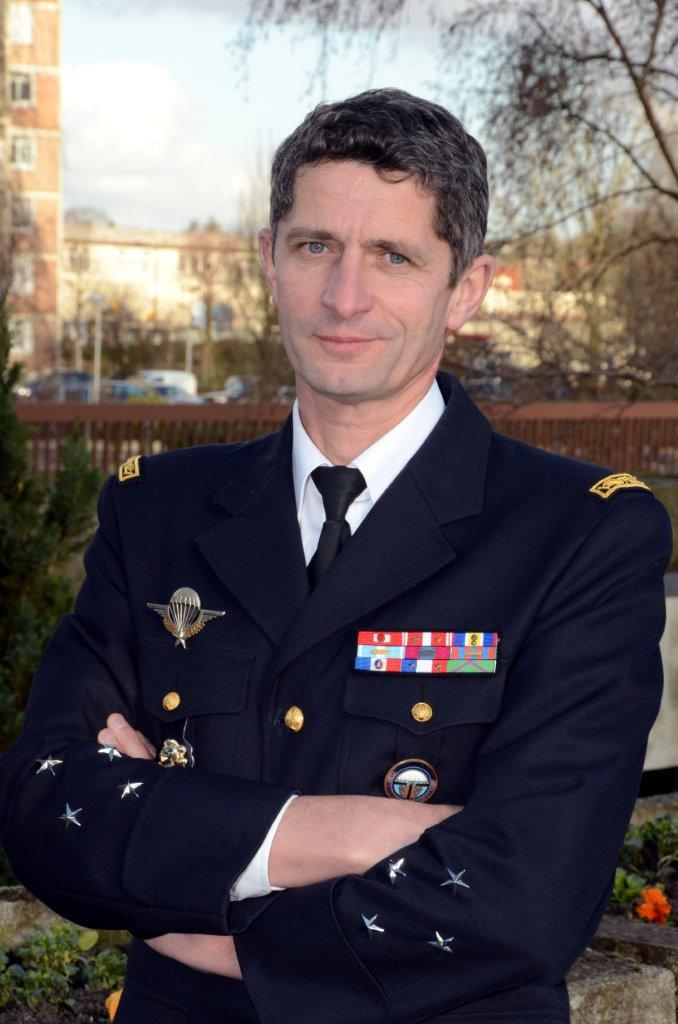
Gendarmerie general Denis Favier, a recipient of the Honour medal for courage and devotion, gold grade

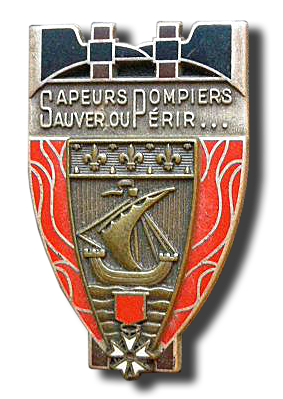
Insignia of the Paris Fire Brigade, a recipient unit of the Honour medal for courage and devotion

- Gendarmerie general Denis Favier
- Paris firefighter Joseph Maigrot
- Rescue helicopter pilot Jean Boulet
- General Jean Bouffet
- Rescue helicopter pilot René Romet
- Navy commander, doctor Éric Dumont
- Police commissioner Robert Blémant
- Paris firefighter lieutenant-colonel Frédéric Curie
- Gendarmerie colonel Olivier Kim
- Firefighter colonel Antoine Battesti
- Surgeon Marie K. Formad
- Military rabbi Paul Haguenauer
- Navy commander Philippe Kieffer
- Police detective Roger Borniche
- Writer and historian Olivier-Raoul-Hugues Chebrou de Lespinats
- Police commissioner Christophe Gavat
- Oscar II, King of Sweden
- Mamoudou Gassama, who climbed the outside of an apartment building to rescue a toddler hanging from a balcony
- Kenneth John Bellamy and Richard Jebbett of Lincolnshire, UK, who jumped into the River Seine in Paris and rescued a drowning woman.

== Recipient units (partial list) ==
- 17th Parachute Engineer Regiment
- Paris Fire Brigade

== See also ==
- Ribbons of the French military and civil awards
