= Callisto (project) =

US-based nonprofit

- Formation: 2011; 15 years ago
- Founders: Jess Ladd
- Type: Nonprofit organization
- Purpose: Technology to empower survivors of sexual assault
- Headquarters: San Francisco, California, U.S.
- Key people: Tracy DeTomasi (CEO)
- Website: projectcallisto.org

Callisto is an American nonprofit organization, created by Jess Ladd, aimed at supporting survivors of sexual assault and privately identifying repeat perpetrators. The organization has developed a series of tools, first "Callisto Campus", followed by "Callisto Expansion", and later "Callisto Vault." Callisto Vault includes two tools: the Incident Log to help survivors document their experience privately, and the Matching System, an encrypted tool that allows survivors to determine if someone else has been harmed by the same perpetrator.

== History ==
Jess Ladd incorporated the nonprofit Sexual Health Innovations (SHI) in 2011, which a mission to create technology to promote sexual health and well-being in the United States. Callisto was originally one of several products of SHI. The first iteration of the system, "Callisto Campus", launched in 2015. This original version contained a feature to send electronic reports to college campus Title IX Coordinators at partnering schools, and did not involve the pro bono legal network that Callisto started using in Callisto Expansion and Callisto Vault. In 2016, SHI was renamed to Callisto, and its organizational mission was changed to focus on sexual assault. In 2018, Callisto launched "Callisto Expansion", a pilot program focused on sexual harassment and assault in the tech industry. This new system connected survivors of serial offenders with free attorneys in event of a "match", rather than administrators at the institution where the violation took place. Since then, the technology and ideas from the tech-industry pilot have been incorporated into a new version of the product ("Callisto Vault") focused on college campuses. Callisto has stopped expanding its original "Callisto Campus" product, but still enables survivors who created timestamped records in the old system to access them. "Callisto Vault" is available to anyone with a .edu email address in the U.S. Currently, Tracy DeTomasi serves as the CEO.

== Incident Logs ==
If users create a private record of their assault, they have the opportunity to be in an environment they feel comfortable in (e.g. at home). The users are encouraged to take breaks so that they do not become overwhelmed. The record does not have to be in chronological order. No one will be able to access the record, unless the user grants access. Callisto's approach is sensitive to trauma when prompting survivors to create this timestamped record.

== Callisto's Matching System ==
If a user decides to enter their perpetrator into Callisto's Matching System, they are asked to enter unique identifying details of their assailant, such as a social media handle or phone number (encryption keeps the identities of the survivor and the perpetrator encrypted, not identifiable even if the database is hacked). If another survivor enters the same unique identifier(s) a match occurs. If a match occurs, each matched survivor is contacted separately to connect with a confidential advocate.

== Callisto's Security ==
Callisto uses modern techniques that allow data to be shared without those sharing revealing any personal information to each other; the same techniques permit two banks to find whether they are being defrauded by the same person, without either bank breaking data protection laws. Techniques of this sort are referred to as Privacy-enhancing technologies (PETs). Not even Callisto engineers can decrypt Callisto Vault's timestamped records or view information about the perpetrators entered into the Matching System.

== Callisto Vault ==
Callisto Vault allows users to save a private timestamped record of their assault, or enter into the Callisto Matching System, a secure and private serial offender detection system. Users of the Matching System enter information about their assailant, and if another user enters information about the same perpetrator, both users are connected to a confidential advocate to help them decide what to do next. According to a 2022 report, a match triggers only emails to two lawyers, each with the contact details of one survivor but not naming the alleged perpetrator; the lawyers then contact the survivors to inform them of the match and offer assistance for any action they wish to take. Callisto Vault is available to anyone over the age of 18 with an active .edu email address from a U.S. college or university.
