= Calista V. Luther =

American missionary

- Born: Calista Vinton; September 1841; Burma
- Died: July 1924 (aged 82); Brooklyn, New York
- Occupations: Baptist missionary, physician
- Parent(s): Justus Vinton, Calista Vinton
- Relatives: Gordon Seagrave (grand-nephew)

Calista Vinton Luther (September 1841 – July 1924) was an American missionary and medical doctor, born in Burma (Myanmar). She was a physician after completing her medical degree in 1885, and ran a small sanitarium in New Jersey.

== Early life ==
Calista Vinton was born in Burma, the daughter of American Baptist missionaries Justus Vinton and Calista Vinton. Her parents had been working in Burma for seven years when she was born. She was educated at Suffield Academy in Connecticut from 1854 to 1858.

== Career ==
From 1864 to 1872, she and her husband continued her parents' work and ran the Kemmerdine Mission school and clinic in Kyimyintaing, three miles from Rangoon (Yangon). Calista Luther wrote an algebra textbook in the Karen language.

Rev. Luther's health suffered, and they moved to the United States. In Philadelphia, Calista V. Luther trained as a physician at the Woman's Medical College of Pennsylvania, graduating in 1885, and practiced in that city. She, Marie K. Formad, and two other women doctors ran an evening dispensary for working women to receive medical care and advice at a convenient time. She ran a small summer sanitarium for women in South Orange, New Jersey and Old Saybrook, Connecticut. She spoke on women's medical education, and modern treatments for insanity. Among her patients was Viscountess de Suzannet, the former Margaret Knower. Luther retired from medical work in 1917.

Luther wrote a biography of her parents, The Vintons and the Karens (1880). She also contributed a chapter on Karen children to Child Life in Many Lands (1903). She was president of the Woman's Baptist Foreign Mission Society in Newark, New Jersey, and of the Alumnae Association of the Woman's Medical College of Pennsylvania. In 1903, she spoke at the annual meeting of the New Jersey Woman Suffrage Association.

== Personal life ==
In 1864, Calista Vinton married a fellow missionary, Robert Morris Luther, an ordained minister trained at Princeton Theological Seminary. They had two daughters, Edith and Agnes, both born in Burma. Calista Vinton Luther was widowed in 1903 and died in July 1924, in Brooklyn. Her brother's grandson was surgeon Gordon Seagrave. Gordon Seagrave was the father of historian Sterling Vinton Seagrave, and grandfather of actress Jocelyn Seagrave.
