= Zak Calisto =

South African billionaire businessman

- Born: 1966 or 1967 (age 59–60); Portugal
- Education: University of South Africa University of the Witwatersrand
- Occupation: Businessman
- Known for: Founder and CEO of Cartrack and Karooooo
- Website: https://karooooo.com/

Zak Calisto (born 1966 or 1967) is a South African billionaire businessman. He is the founder and CEO of Cartrack and Karooooo.

Calisto was born in Portugal, and grew up in the then Portuguese colony of Mozambique, where his father was a government official.

In 2001, Calisto founded Cartrack, a software as a service (SaaS) vehicle-tracking platform.

In 2014, Cartrack was listed on the JSE, and in 2021 the holding company was rebranded and relisted on the JSE as Karooooo.

In October 2025, it was reported that for the half year ended 31 August 2025, Karooooo's revenue had increased 20% to US$139 million, profits by 17.2% to $27.6 million, with subscription services making up 98% of revenue. Karooooo hit an estimated valuation of $1.74 billion as at October 2025 following this performance; with Calisto holding an estimated 58% stake, this meant that he became a USD billionaire.
