= Eugenio Kincaid =

American Baptist missionary

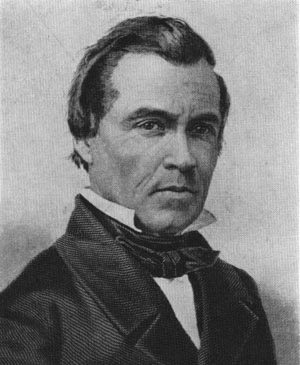
- Missionary to Burma
- Born: January 10, 1797; Wethersfield, Connecticut, United States
- Died: April 3, 1883 (aged 86); Girard, Kansas, United States

Eugenio Kincaid (10 January 1797 – 3 April 1883) was an American Baptist missionary who labored for two periods in Burma (now known as Myanmar).

In the first period, he served twelve years. In the second period, he served for another fifteen years. His mission work in Burma covered the whole range of the country, from the farthest north to the farthest south and from the farthest west to almost the farthest east. Between the two periods of his ministry, he had eight years of leave of absence during which he raised funds for the foreign missions, and in addition, helped in the foundation of the University of Lewisburg (later renamed Bucknell University). At the age of 33, Kincaid was sent by Baptist Board of Foreign Missions to preach the gospel in Burma.

His tombstone is found in Girard Kansas where he retired for his health and died.

== Early life ==
Eugenio Kincaid was born on 10 January 1797 in Wethersfield, Connecticut, to Noah Kincaid, a physician, and Lydia Hough Kincaid. He worked as a teacher in Pennsylvania before joining a Baptist Church and deciding to study theology. In 1822 he graduated from the Literary and Theological Institution (later renamed Madison and then Colgate University) at Hamilton New York. He and Jonathan Wade were the first students at the institution.

He was strongly inclined to preach for the salvation of the people in Burma after hearing a sermon from Luther Rice, a fellow missionary of Adoniram Judson. and applied to the Baptist Board of Missions for an appointment to serve in Burma, but was rejected. He then assumed the pastorate of the Baptist Church in Galway, New York. He was well liked by the congregation but he did not feel contented to remain there. After four years, he then went to Susquehanna valley, a more destitute place, and founded the First Baptist Church in Milton, Pennsylvania starting with nine members. He was also the editor of The Literary and Evangelical Register. He married Miss Almy Goff and had two sons, Eugenio Wade Kincaid and Judson Kincaid, as well as three children who died in childhood.

In 1828, he was appointed as a travelling preacher by the Board of the Baptist General Association of Pennsylvania for Missionary Purposes. After serving in that position for two years, he was appointed by the Executive Committee of the Baptist Mission Union to be posted to Burma together with Francis Mason. The assignment for Kincaid and Mason was to continue the pioneering mission work of Adoniram Judson that was started in 1813. Adoniram was pouring most of his labor towards completing the Burmese Bible. The Kincaids and the Masons sailed from Boston in 1830 and after four months they reached Moulmain (now known as Mawlamyaing) which was under British rule following the First Anglo-Burmese War.

== Mission to Burma ==
While learning to acquire the Burmese language, Rev. Kincaid engaged himself by preaching in Moulmain to the English congregation, consisting entirely of British soldiers. Within a year, one hundred soldiers were converted and baptized.

In December 1831, his wife Almy died of a tropical disease. In 1832, Kincaid moved to Rangoon (now known as Yangon) which was still under Burmese control. He took charge of the mission schools and with the help of native missionary assistants he maintained many of the public services of the mission. In 1833, the year of his stay in Rangoon, he married Barbara McBain, daughter of a Scottish officer of the East India Company. They had eight children.

== Mission to Ava ==
The following year, Rev. Kincaid took a river boat to the capital Ava, 700 miles up the Irrawaddy. Accompanying the Kincaids were Barbara's sister and two native missionary assistants. They encountered many robbers along the river but escaped without any harm. They distributed a large quantity of religious tracts and portions of the New Testament. The trip took fifty four days and they visited three hundred villages and towns preaching the gospel in most of them.

The reception at the capital was chilly mainly because the king had not forgiven Adoniram Judson for going over to the enemy after the war. Nevertheless, a church was planted by the end of a year and Rev. Kincaid was permitted to preach to hundreds of thousands of people during the three years he was there. Rev. Kincaid met many Shan merchants in Ava and he made a plan to visit and learn the habits and characters of these people and other ethnic nationalities. But the government was opposed to him to travel to the frontiers of Assam and China border. By his persistence, he obtained at length the permission from the government.

In January 1837, Rev. Kincaid and four of his native assistants went up the Irrawaddy with a boat provided by the British Resident. They stopped at many villages and distributed tracts and preached the gospel and they were warmly received. After 23 days and 350 miles from Ava, they arrived at Mogaung in Kachin state known for its jade mines. It was the northernmost town of the country beneath the shadows of the Himalaya mountains. Since it was impossible to procure men and provisions needed for further excursion, Kincaid decided to return to Ava. On the return trip, he was exposed to extreme perils and suffering because a civil war had broken out. Bands of robbers were overrunning the land, pillaging and burning the villages. Kincaid and his disciples were robbed repeatedly but miraculously he was able to escape on foot through the mountains of the Shan State. The disciples also managed to escape earlier.

On his arrival in Ava, he found out King Bagyidaw was dethroned by his brother Prince Tharawaddy and many had lost their lives. Rev. Kincaid requested for an audience with the new king and was received cordially. However, the king told him that as the defender of the faith, he had to forbid him from distributing any Christian literature in his realm. Under the threatening circumstances and fear of the approaching war, Rev. Kincaid decided to go to more promising fields of Tenasserim (now known as Tanintharyi). He made a long exploration trip through the mountains near Mergui (now known as Myeik). He saw countless number of tracks of rhinoceros, elephant, tiger, monkey, wild hog, and deer. He stopped in tribal villages and preach and baptized the converts.

He then turned towards the British controlled province of Arakan (now known as Rakhine State). Laboring in the city of Akyab (now known as Sittwe, he made many excursions to all the accessible points to preach the gospel. One day, a chief from the Khami-Chin tribe, named Chetza or "The Great Mountain Chief" paid him a visit. On his return, the Chief together with thirteen petty chiefs wrote a letter urging him to visit the mountains of Chin Hills and preach the gospel to them. Rev. Kincaid accompanied by Rev. L Stilson set off to Chetza's domain, seventy six miles away and Rev. Stilson established the Khami Mission station, learned their language and reduced it to writing. He converted and Baptized hundreds of them.

== Prolonged Sojourn in America ==
In 1843, the Kincaids made a long visit to America. They had been in Burma for twelve years and the health of Barbara Kincaid required a change of climate. They had two daughters. Their son Eugenio Wade Kincaid died before they could return to America. The main reason for returning home was the unsettled state of situation in the Burmese Empire. During that long leave of absence, Kincaid travelled to nearly every state of the union raising funds to support the missions and preaching very effective sermons. In addition, he was instrumental in the founding of the University of Lewisburg (later renamed Bucknell University) in Pennsylvania.

In 1846, King Tharrawaddy Min died and his son Pagan Min ascended the throne. Kincaid returned to Moulmein in the early part of 1851 and proceeded to Rangoon. The old disciples received him warmly and a few more Burmese and Karens were baptized.

The encouraging mission work was interrupted by the arrival of a British frigate and four armed steamers. They demanded redress of grievances on behalf of the East India Company. Barbara Kincaid took refuge on a British merchant ship as she was a British subject and Eugenio Kincaid was asked, because of his knowledge of Burmese, to accompany the British delegation to the provincial governor. Against Rev Kincaid strong objection, the leader of the British delegation insisted on riding their horses into the governor's compound, which was considered an insult according to Burmese custom. The governor refused to meet the delegation. British ships blockaded the port and the Second Anglo-Burmese War had begun. By the end of 1852, the whole of Lower Burma was in British hands.

In 1853, Pagan Min was deposed and his half-brother Mindon was invited by the Council of Ministers at Amarapura. Midon ascended the throne as Mindon Min. Rev. Kincaid went to Prome (now known as Pyay) and made many excursions to the surrounding area and many Burmese and Karens were baptized.

== Mission to Amarapura ==
The king Mindon Min invited Rev. Kincaid to the royal residence in Amarapura. After two visits to the court, where he was cordially received, the king persuaded him to visit the United States as an envoy from Burma. The king wanted to establish a friendly relation between the two governments. Rev. Kincaid accepted the proposal because Barbara Kincaid needed a change of climate for her feeble health and also there were some misunderstandings between the Baptist Board of Missions and a number of the missionaries in the field, with regard to policies and field of labor, etc., to be resolved.

In 1857, Kincaid carried the royal letter, enclosed in an ivory box lined with crimson velvet, and proceeded to Washington, DC to present it to President James Buchanan. In response, the president prepared a respectful and appropriate reply and entrusted Kincaid with a large number of valuable national publications as gifts. In 1857, Rev. Kincaid left his family in America and returned to Burma by way of England, the Mediterranean and overland route from Alexandria to Suez and oversea through Gulf of Suez to Ceylon, Calcutta and Burma. After finishing mission business in Prome, Rev. Kincaid proceeded to the royal city. The king extended to the missionaries freedom to preach. The king also ordered his ministers to build a house for Rev Kincaid within the palace ground in the new capital Mandalay but Rev. Kincaid declined and went back to Prome.

From 1857 to 1865, Kincaid served at Prome, primarily among the Karen and Shan peoples.

== Later life ==
In failing health, Kincaid returned to the United States in 1866, retiring first as a supply preacher in Philadelphia and later in Girard Kansas; he died there on April 3, 1883. Barbara Kincaid died a few weeks later on April 28 at the age of 65.<Gerald Anderson, Biographical Dictionary of Christian Missions, published by MacMillan, 1998>

== See also ==
- List of Protestant Missionaries to Southeast Asia
- Adoniram Judson
- Calista Vinton
