= Foug =

- Commune
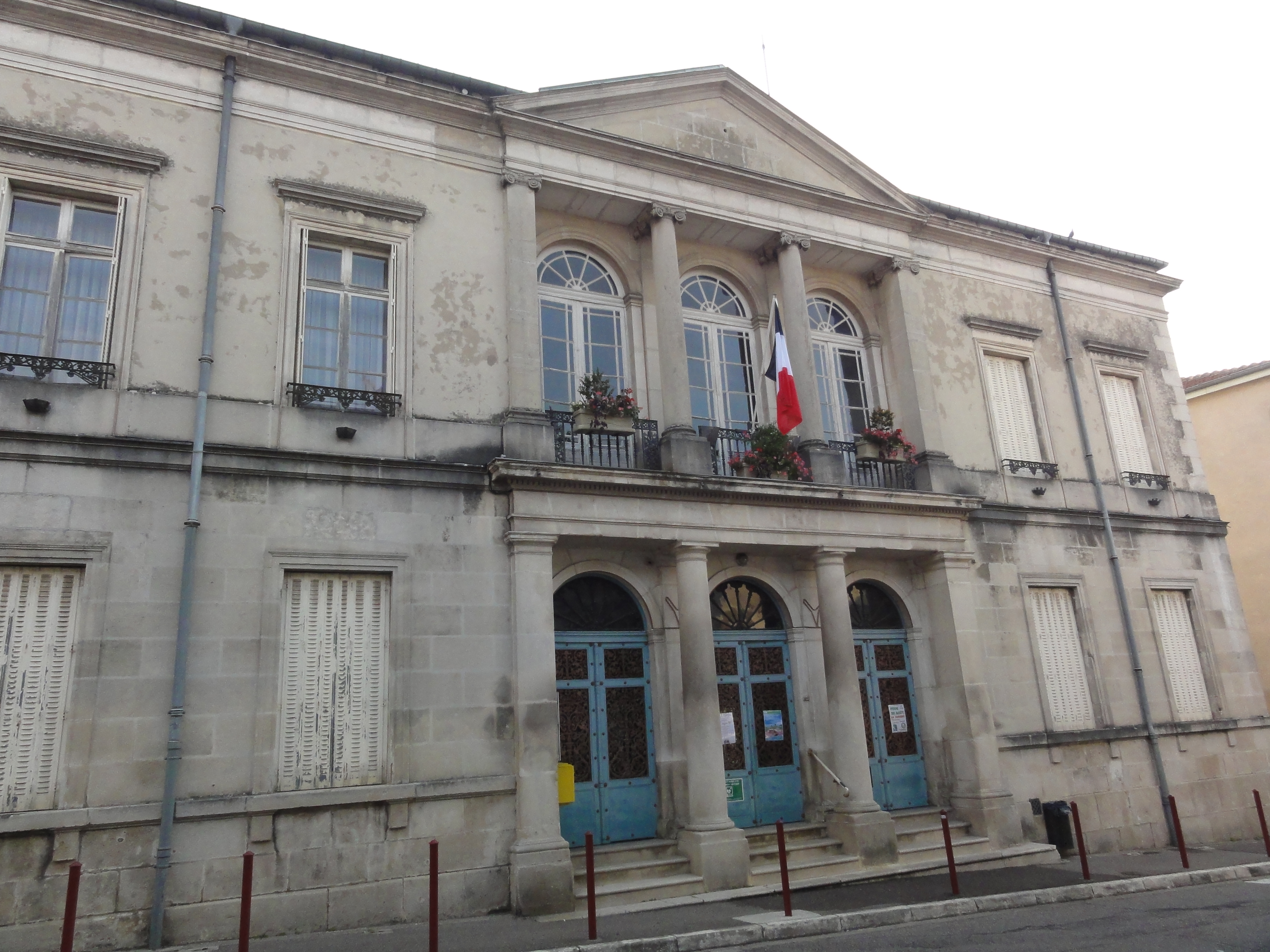
- The town hall in Foug

- Coat of arms
- Location of Foug
- Location within France Location within Grand Est
- Coordinates: 48°41′06″N 5°47′14″E
- Country: France
- Region: Grand Est
- Department: Meurthe-et-Moselle
- Arrondissement: Toul
- Canton: Toul

Government
  - Mayor (2020–2026): Philippe Monaldeschi
- Area^{1}: 25.49 km^{2} (9.84 sq mi)
- Elevation: 270 m (890 ft)
- Highest elevation: 396 m (1,299 ft)
- Lowest elevation: 231 m (758 ft)
- Population (2023): 2,628
  - Density: 103.1/km^{2} (267.0/sq mi)
- Time zone: UTC+01:00 (CET)
  - Summer (DST): UTC+02:00 (CEST)
- INSEE/Postal code: 54205 /54570
- ^{1} French Land Register data, which excludes lakes, ponds, glaciers > 1 km^{2} (0.386 sq mi or 247 acres) and river estuaries.

Foug (French pronunciation: [fu]) is a commune in the Meurthe-et-Moselle department in the grand Est region of France.

== History ==
=== Prehistory ===
No artefacts from this time period have been found near Foug.

=== Proto history ===
The historian Henri Lepage says in his book on the Meurthe: « In the forest atop the small hill traversed by the Marne-Rhine canal, not far from the Nasium Roman road of Toul, there exists walls placed like the ones of an amphitheatre with inner seats. It must go back to an early period, maybe the celtic period. » In 1897 various items dating back to the bronze age period are found on the Moncel hill.

=== Roman occupation ===
The Roman road going from Reims to Toul went through the location currently occupied by the Savonnière farm. On the side of this road near Savonniére, a terracotta medallion and an aureus depicting Roman emperor Caracalla were found in 1955. The aureus was dated to have been made in the year 198.

There is also various mentions of a Roman camp in the Raumont woods but to this day there have been no archeological proof of this camp's existence. However, on the territory of the Laneuveville-derrière-Foug, which used to be a part of Foug during the Ancien Régime, Olry Terquem state: "At Les Sarrazines, important Gallo-Roman substructions with tiles, clay pot fragments, sawn stone and grinding wheel fragments, etc. Around 1820 a clay pot containing various coins was extracted from this place." he also said: "The summit and the base of the Raumont woods must have been buried by buildings because the ground is covered by ceramic shards, and clay pots and other debris from that time period." Clues on the existence of a Gallo-Roman settlement have been found near Champigneul and the Savonniére farm in the year 1994 and the year 1998. Before that there was the discovery of various coins depicting various Roman emperors and their spouses including: Augustus, Nero, Hadrian, Faustina the Elder, Antoninus Pius and Marcus Aurelius.

== Population ==
Historical population
Year	Pop.	±% p.a.
1968	3,415	—
1975	3,373	−0.18%
1982	3,048	−1.44%
1990	2,873	−0.74%
1999	2,740	−0.53%
2007	2,765	+0.11%
2012	2,701	−0.47%
2017	2,663	−0.28%
2023	2,628	−0.22%
Source: INSEE

== See also ==
- Communes of the Meurthe-et-Moselle department
