= Kalista Sy =

Senegalese screenwriter

- Born: 1 January 1982 (age 44)
- Citizenship: Senegal
- Occupations: Screenwriter; Film director; Journalist

Kalista Sy (born about 1985) is a Senegalese screenwriter known for writing and producing the TV series Mistress of a Married Man (Maîtresse d'un homme marié, 2019–present). The series is set in Dakar and premiered on Marodi TV Sénégal in January 2019.

== Career ==
In January 2019 the first episode of Mistress of a Married Man aired on Marodi TV Sénégal and went viral in Africa on YouTube.

Sy's show focuses on the lives of everyday Senegalese women. The show's storylines, including sex, infidelity, domestic abuse, and polygamy, which are not usually covered in Senegalese media, have resulted in controversy. The series' frank discussion of female sexual freedom led to Islamic clerics calling for it to be banned.

Professor Marame Gueye wrote of Sy that, "Her female cast does not practice the widely accepted skin bleaching prominently featured in earlier series as the standard of beauty for Senegalese women. More importantly, the series puts women’s experiences at the center of its storyline. Marème and her cohort are ambitious women with jobs and their lives do not center exclusively on their relationships with men."

In 2019, she was listed among the BBC's 100 Women.

Sy is listed as a contributor to The Women Writers Handbook (2020).

== Personal life ==
Sy lives in Dakar, Sengal and is married to Medoune Diop, a computer scientist. She is a former television journalist.
