= Calista Robinson Jones =

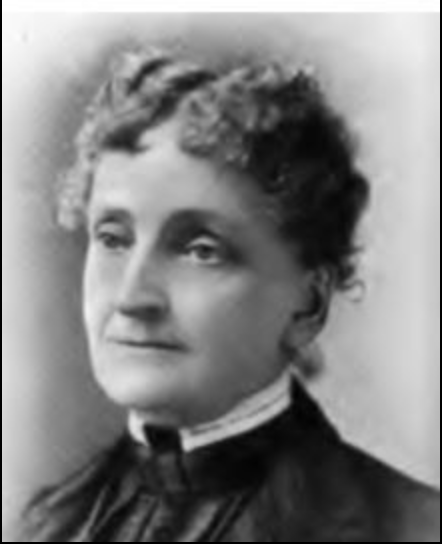
- Born: Calista Robinson; March 22, 1839; Chelsea, Vermont, U.S.
- Died: January 30, 1913 (aged 73); Bradford, Vermont
- Occupation: patriotic relief worker
- Known for: National President of the Woman's Relief Corps
- Spouse: Charles Jones (m. 1864–1902)
- Children: 1

Signature
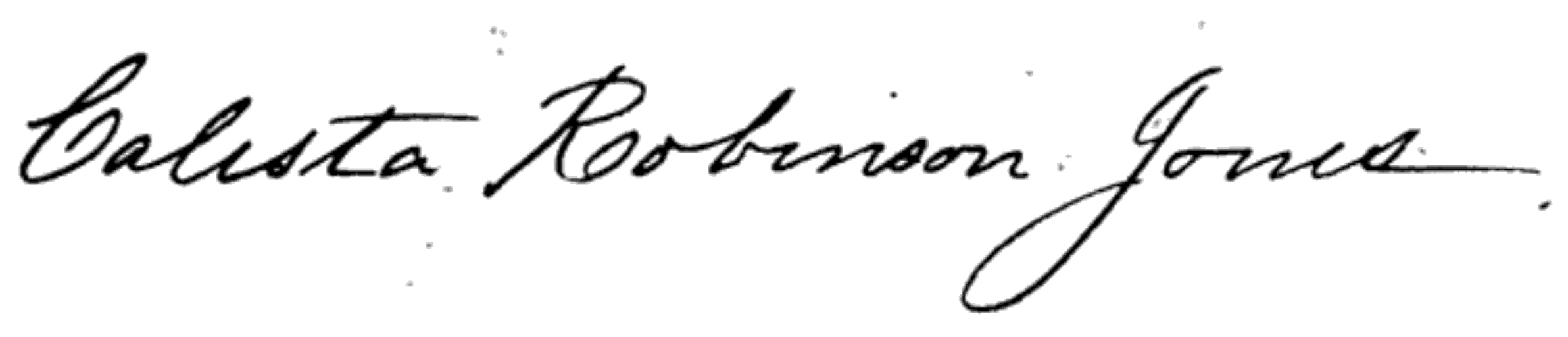

Calista Robinson Jones (1839–1913) was an American relief leader who served as the nineteenth national president of the Woman's Relief Corps (WRC) (1901–02). She is also remembered for her patriotism. When the Civil War broke out, Jones was teaching in Chicago. She, with two other teachers, sewed a flag which they raised over their school, and so far as was known in its day, it was the first flag to be raised over a schoolhouse in Chicago, and perhaps in the state of Illinois.

== Early life and education ==
Calista Robinson was born March 22, 1839, in Chelsea, Vermont, and during the greater part of her life, was a resident of that State, much of that time in Bradford, Vermont.

Her parents were Cornelius and Mary A. (Pike) Robinson. Her maternal grandmother, Sophia Lyman, wife of James Pike, was a daughter of Richard Lyman, of Lebanon, Connecticut, who marched with others from Connecticut "for the relief of Boston in the Lexington Alarm, April 1775," and in April 1777, enlisted for three years under Captain Benjamin Throop, having the rank of Sergeant in the 1st Connecticut Regiment, under Colonel Jedediah Huntington. Solomon Robinson, great-grandfather of Cornelius Robinson, was in the Battle of Bennington.

Jones was educated in the public schools and academy of Chelsea, and at Rutgers Female Institute, New York City.

== Career ==
For three years, she was a teacher in the Washington School in Chicago. A few days after the attack on Fort Sumter, with the assistance of three other teachers, she made a regulation 15 feet (4.6 m) bunting flag, every star of which was sewed on by hand. This was the first flag to float over a schoolhouse in Chicago. Also during the civil war, she assisted in distributing supplies to the thousands of troops who passed through that city en route for Washington, D.C..

Returning to Vermont in 1864, she married Charles Jones (July 18, 1837 - April 1901) in Chelsea. He was a native of Tunbridge, Vermont, and a graduate of Chelsea Academy.

When a Relief Corps auxiliary to Washburn Post, Grand Army of the Republic (GAR), was formed in Bradford, Jones became a charter member, serving as president two years and holding some office thereafter. The Department Convention of Vermont elected her successively junior vice-president, senior vice-president, and president. She served on important committees in the State and national organizations, and was active as a member of the Andersonville Prison Board of the National WRC. After doing effective work as Department Patriotic Instructor, she was appointed a member of the first National Committee on Patriotic Instruction. She was national junior vice-president in 1899.

In the year ending June 30, 1901, there were 3,106 corps and 144,387 members. At the convention held in Cleveland, Ohio, in September 1901, five months after becoming widowed, Jones was elected National President, receiving a unanimous vote. She was the first member from Vermont to be elected to the high office.

To Jones was primarily due the founding and establishment of the Bradford Public Library. She was one of the Trustees and chair of its Book Committee. Its beginning was in 1874, when Jones and Mrs. Albert Bailey went about from house to house, and procured subscriptions of US$1 each from sixty-three women to a fund for the purchase of books for a library. In addition to the annual subscriptions, money was obtained by entertainments and lectures conducted by the association. The books were kept at the house of Mrs. Jones, who acted as librarian three years. The building was dedicated in 1895.

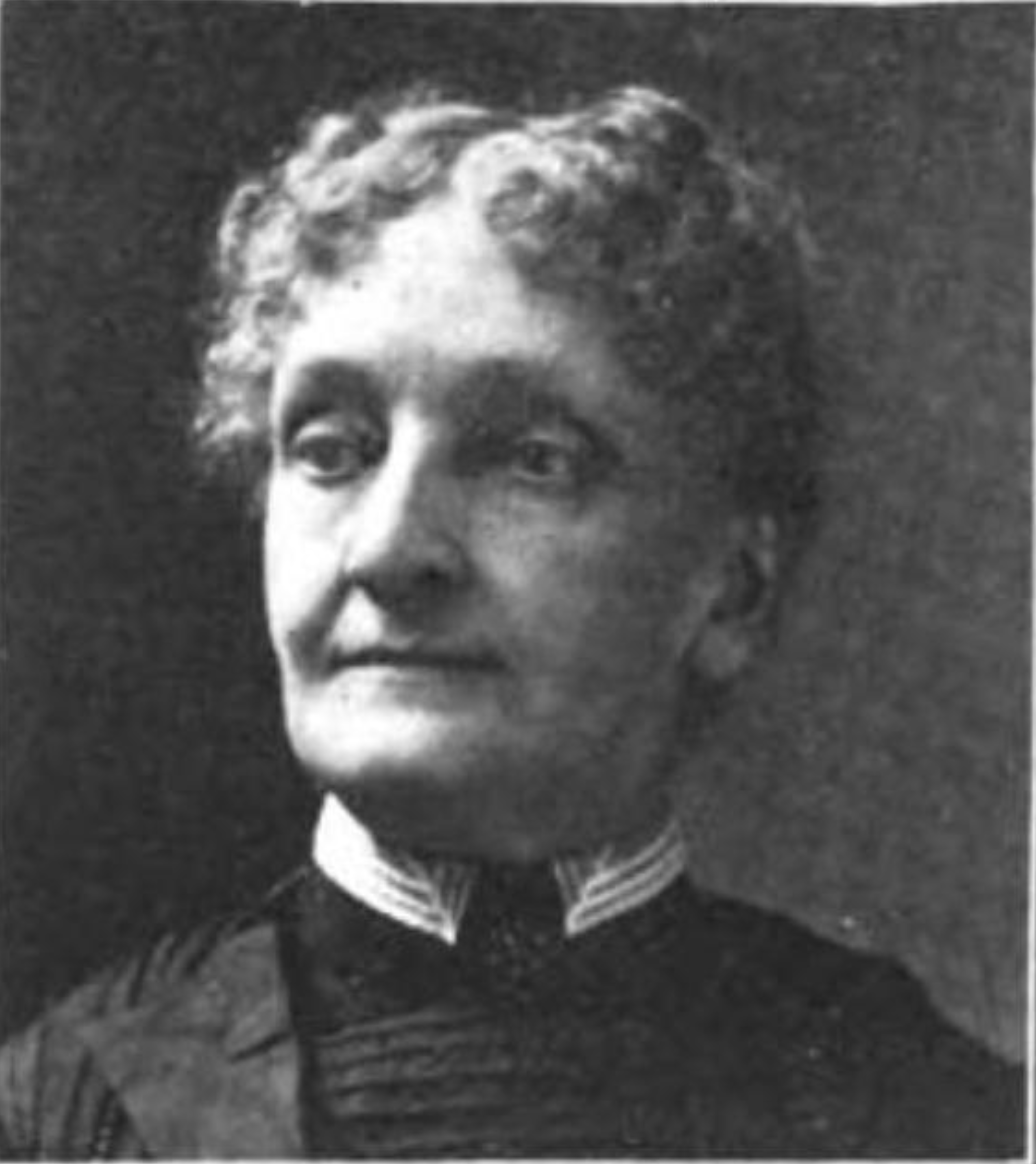
Jones in 1904

Jones was president of the Ladies' Congregational church society of Bradford. She was a member of the George Washington Memorial Association, and the Daughters of the American Revolution, having been a member of the first Chapter in Vermont. She also served as a delegate to the National Council of Women.

== Personal life ==
Calista's husband, Charles Jones, was engaged for many years in the insurance business in Bradford, in partnership with Colonel John C. Stearns. The firm became one of the best known in that section of Vermont. Mr. Jones held various positions of trust in Bradford, serving as president of the Village Corporation, Water Commissioner, School Trustee, and director and treasurer of the Bradford Electric Lighting Company. He died in April 1901. The couple had one daughter, Mary Ellen, who was born in Bradford, May 30, 1868.

Calista Robinson Jones died at her home in Bradford, Vermont on January 30, 1913.
