= Callistus =

Callistus, Calistus, Callixtus, and Calixtus (all four in Latin) and Kallistos (Greek: Κάλλιστος "the most beautiful one") may refer to:

== Patriarchs, popes and antipopes ==
- Patriarch Callistus I of Constantinople, patriarch from 1350 to 1353 and from 1354 to 1363
- Patriarch Callistus II of Constantinople, patriarch in 1397
- Saint Callixtus I, pope from c. 217 to 222
- Pope Callixtus II, pope from 1119 to 1124
- Antipope Callixtus III, antipope from 1168 to 1178
- Pope Callixtus III, pope from 1455 to 1458

== Other persons ==
- Callistus, a Roman general of the 3rd century more commonly known as Balista
- Callistus Caravario (1903–1930), Italian Roman Catholic priest and missionary
- Callistus Chukwu (born 1990), Nigerian footballer
- Callistus Ndlovu (1936–2019), Zimbabwean politician
- Callistus Valentine Onaga (born 1958), Nigerian Roman Catholic bishop
- Callistus Rubaramira (born 1950), Ugandan Roman Catholic bishop
- Gaius Julius Callistus, a Greek freedman of the Roman emperor Caligula
- Georg Calixtus (1586–1656), German Lutheran theologian
- Kallistos Ware (1934–2022), Metropolitan of Diokleia in Phrygia, an Orthodox assistant bishop in the UK
- Nikephoros Kallistos Xanthopoulos, last of the Greek ecclesiastical historians, flourished c. 1320

== See also ==
- Calixte, French-language variant
