= Calista Vinton =

American Baptist missionary

Calista H. Vinton
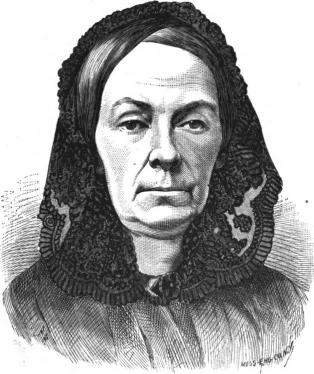
- Missionary to Burma
- Born: April 19, 1807; Willington, Connecticut, US
- Died: December 18, 1864 (aged 57); Rangoon, Burma

Calista H. Vinton (19 April 1807 – 18 December 1864) was an American Baptist missionary who labored for 30 years in Burma (now known as Myanmar) preaching, teaching and caring amongst the Karen people. Both Calista and her husband Justus Vinton were eminently successful in making conversions.

== Early life ==
Calista Vinton was born on 19 April 1807 to Thomas and Lavinia Holman in Union, Connecticut. When she was sixteen years old she had a severe illness. After two years, her family and doctors had given up hope. Being a pious girl, she requested baptism as her dying wish and was carried on a chair and helped by the pastor and a deacon into a brook and baptized in March 1822. She was received into the West Woodstock Baptist Church, and pastor Elder Grow, while administering the Lord's Supper to her, said "This is our sister's first communion, and it will probably be her last." However, she recovered her health and began to think her life was given to her for a special purpose. She completed her education by alternately teaching and studying.

She met Justus Vinton, who was studying at the Hamilton Literary and Theological Institute (now Colgate University). They chose Burma as their field of their future work and spent a year together at Hamilton studying the Karen language from Ko Chet Thaing, one of two native disciples brought along by Rev. Jonathan Wade on his furlough. Calista and Justus were married on April 9, 1834, and they sailed in July 1834 for Burma with other missionaries, including Rev. and Mrs. Wade and Ko Chet Thaing.

== Working in the jungles around Moulmein ==
Since Justus and Calista were sufficiently familiar with the Karen language, they immediately commenced their mission work to the Karens in the jungles around Moulmein (now known as Mawlamyine). They traveled in native canoes, on horseback, on elephants, on buffalo carts and on foot. At first they went together from village to village preaching. Afterward, they went separately because they received so many invitations from distant villages. The work of preaching was combined with the ministering to the sick. Calista held prayer meetings in villages. Jungle traveling was extremely dangerous because tigers and other wild animals were abundant, and she narrowly escaped them on many occasion.

Calista established many schools in mission stations and staffed them with native scholars she had trained. The British government offered "grant in aid", a sum of money equal to the amount expended by the school for educational purposes. The only restriction was for the school to be open to the government director of education for inspection.

In April 1840, Calista gave birth to a son Justus Brainerd, and in September 1841 a daughter Calista was born. Also in 1841, Justus's sister Miranda joined them for jungle mission work and later worked as a teacher in Normal Karen Mission School; she was known as Sister Miranda to the Karens. In 1846, a third child, Harvey Howard, was born to Mrs. Vinton; he died before his first birthday.

== Visit to America ==
In 1847, Mrs. Vinton's health failed and it was thought best to return to America to recover. Rev. Vinton also needed a rest after fourteen years of strenuous jungle work. They also felt the missionary spirit in the American churches needed to be rekindled. Rev. Vinton took two Karen disciples, Myah A and Kone Lowk, to assist him in his translation of the bible into Karen. While they were waiting for a transfer ship in Cape Town, their youngest child fell ill and died. The family landed in Boston in the early part of 1848.

Rev. Vinton spent most of his time in America visiting churches to reawaken the missionary spirit, often accompanied by Myah A and Kone Lowk.

== The five-franc piece that grew into a chapel ==
Mrs. Vinton, who was still very ill, rested at the home of Deacon Granger in Suffield, Connecticut. She held conversation gatherings in her sickroom. A poor lady named Mary Ann Bestor had been given a five-franc piece to buy a warm dress for the winter. She wanted to contribute something to the cause of mission but was fearful that people would blame her for "giving from the depth of her poverty". Consequently, she concealed the money in the toe of one of a pair of stockings she was knitting; she handed them to Myah A and told him to give them to Mrs. Vinton and tell her that the contents of the toe were for the mission to the Karens.

When Mrs. Vinton learned how poor Mary Ann was, she wanted to do something special with that holy money. She mentioned about it to a deacon from Hartford. The deacon said, "It is cold weather, Frankie should have a wrapper", and handed her a ten-dollar bill, which she wrapped around the five-franc piece "to keep him warm". The next day, another ten-dollar bill was given by another Hartford deacon, "to buy Frankie an overcoat, as the weather had grown colder". A lady from Suffield, hearing the story, said, "These are stinging nights to sleep alone: Frankie must have a bedfellow", and a five-dollar gold piece was laid by his side.

Mrs. Vinton thought if she could get some more wrappers, she would send Frankie to Boston to buy some bibles for the Karens. She wrote the "Frankie" story and sent it to the pastor of Suffield Church. The pastor keenly appreciated the wit and read the letter from the pulpit Thirty dollars were donated to "purchase Frankie suitable clothes for the journey". Mrs. Vinton sent off "Frankie and the wrappers" to a Boston publisher with a note about his story. The publisher returned "Frankie" with additional wrappers and the bibles. Next, Mrs. Vinton sent "Frankie" to a doctor in Philadelphia to buy a box of medicine for the Karens. The doctor returned "Frankie" with more wrappers and a box of medicine. "Frankie's" travel kept continuing from cities to cities, churches to churches. Rev. and Mrs. Vinton then decided they would build a house of the Lord for the Karens and it would be called Frank's Chapel. But unknown to them, war, pestilence, famine and censure awaited them and the Frank's Chapel would not be materialized for another five years.

== Relief mission to Rangoon ==
In 1850, the Vintons returned to Moulmein accompanied by a large contingent of missionaries, including Eugenio Kincaid and Jonathan Wade. They were immediately engaged in their respective mission works. The Vintons had a special affinity to the Karens in the vicinity of Rangoon. On his frequent visits to the then Burmese-controlled Rangoon District, he baptized many Karen converts won over from the seeds sown by Saw Tha Byu, a disciple of Adoniram Judson. The Karens were illiterate until their language was reduced by Jonathan Wade and Francis Mason into written form using the Burmese script. Some young Karen in the Rangoon district traveled on foot through the forests and mountain ranges from Rangoon to Moulmein to attend the Karen schools established by Mrs. Vinton. On their return, they brought back tracts and copies of the New Testament translated by Jonathan Wade into Sgaw Karen, risking the ire of the intolerant local authorities. They then read in secret to their fellow converts.

On the eve of the Second Anglo-Burmese War, lawlessness prevailed over the Rangoon district, and Karens, in particular, suffered heavily. Seventeen Karen churches in the district asked Rev. Vinton to come to their aid, and he went to Rangoon. Six weeks after the fall of Rangoon to the British, Mrs. Vinton and the family followed suit. They set up an emergency hospital in a vacant monastery, and soon it was overflowing with cases of smallpox, measles, whooping cough, dysentery, cholera, etc. The pestilence was followed by famine, and the Vintons fed multitudes of both Christians and non-Christians with provisions procured on credit from friendly merchants. When they were evicted from the monastery, the Vintons purchased land in Kemmendine (now known as Kyimyintaing), three miles from Rangoon. There they built the mission center, a hospital, and a school. The Baptist Mission Union censured Rev. Vinton for his insubordination and for abandoning his assigned post in Moulmein. The Vintons accepted the offer from Baptist Free Mission Society to act as their agent in collecting donations from friends in America and transmitting the funds.

== Kemmendine mission ==
Mrs. Vinton was completely responsible for running the mission school in Kemmendine, which had 200 to 250 pupils. Besides teaching, conducting prayer meetings, acting as physician and nurse to her own pupils and the sick in the neighborhood, making and translating textbooks and hymns, she traveled, in the dry season, to villages in the north and west of Rangoon, preaching the gospel. During the dry season, her older pupils usually went home to help their parents in harvesting. In addition, she educated her son Brainerd and daughter Calista. In 1854, Brainerd was sent to Hamilton, New York, and Calista to Suffield, Connecticut, to continue their studies.

In 1854, Sister Miranda went home to visit her aged parents, and on her return to Rangoon she married Rev, Norman Harris of the Karen Mission in Shwekyin, a very unhealthy place in those days. Less than four months after the marriage, Sister Miranda was taken ill with a high fever and died.

After the situation had stabilized in Rangoon, renewed efforts were made to build Frank's Chapel. More donations came in from the native Christians as well as the British residents in Rangoon. Many officers of the British army donated their architectural and engineering talents and their time to draw plans for the church. Lord Dalhousie, the Governor General of India, made the land in Kemmendine overlooking the Rangoon River a gift to the mission. On 20 May 1855, a cornerstone of the church was laid by Rev. Vinton in the presence of many native and British friends. It was a large two-story brick building with the upper story for church services and the lower story for schoolrooms. The Karen Home Mission Society was also housed in that building. It was called Frank's Church, and later came to be known as Reverend Vinton Memorial Church.

In 1858, Rev. Vinton went on an excursion to Shwekyin, to select locations to post his native preachers and came home with the jungle illness and died on 31 March. Mrs. Vinton continued the mission work of Rev. Vinton assisted ably by native preachers, Mao-yay, Nga-lay, and Yai-pau. She deputized two very able assistants, Fidelia and Eliza who were earlier trained by Sister Miranda in Karen Normal School in Moulmein. In 1858 Calista arrived back from Suffield and mother and daughter were reunited. Calista engaged in the mission work immediately teaching mathematics, vocal music and supervising the boarding school. As usual, Mrs Vinton traveled and spent time in jungle villages. Often, she found herself settling disputes between church members.

In 1861, Brainerd completed the course in Madison University (now Colgate University) and married Julia A. Haswell, eldest daughter of Rev. James Madison Haswell of the Burmese Mission in Moulmein. Brainerd and Julia were playmates in the mission compound in Moulmein. He found both his mother and sister to be in failing health. Nevertheless, Mrs. Vinton went on a tour with Brainerd, and the disciples in villages rejoiced at seeing the "son of his father". In 1862, Mrs. Vinton and Calista left Rangoon for Falmouth, England and visited many British friends, most of whom had retired from civil and military service in Burma. They spent one month as guests of their old friend Mrs. and General Bell, Commander-in-Chief of the British Forces during the Second Anglo-Burmese War. They then sailed for New York, where Mrs. Vinton attended the Free Mission Society meeting and met R. M. Luther, who had just completed his study at Princeton Theological Seminary. He was resolved to devote his life to mission work but had not decided on his field. Mrs. Vinton persuaded him to make the Karen mission his field. While in America, she was called upon to make many missionary addresses. She and Luther made a trip through Buffalo, Cleveland, Cincinnati, Chicago, and churches of northern Illinois and southern Wisconsin and part of Canada. She sailed to England in December 1863 and took the overland route through Egypt and Red Sea to Calcutta and Rangoon.

Mrs. Vinton engaged immediately in the work of the mission and started building a second mission house for the newly married Rev. R. M. Luther and her daughter Calista. On 1 November, Mrs. Vinton was attacked with an acute form of inflammation of the alimentary canal. On 6 December, Mr. and Mrs. Luther arrived and gave her some strength for a while, but she died peacefully on 18 December 1864.

== Legacy ==
In 1872, the Baptist Missionary Union vindicated Rev. Vinton of the "deputation" and Brainerd and Calista rejoined the Union.

Mr. and Mrs. Luther remained at the Kemmendine Mission until 1872, when Mr. Luther fell sick with jungle fever and they were compelled to return to America. He later became the district secretary of the Baptist Missionary Union and a pastor at Newark, New Jersey. Calista became a practicing physician. She wrote a memoir of her parents, The Vintons and the Karens, Memorials of Rev. Justus H. Vinton and Calista H. Vinton, and published it in 1880.

Dr. J. Brainerd Vinton and his sister Mrs Seagrave continued the mission work of their parents until his death on 23 June 1887.

Several of her great-grandchildren continued missionary work in Burma, including the surgeon Gordon Seagrave.

== See also ==
- List of Protestant Missionaries to Southeast Asia
