= Callista Balko =

American softball player

Callista Jo Balko (born April 4, 1986) is an American, former collegiate right-handed hitting pro softball catcher and additionally played second base during her collegiate career. She played for the Arizona Wildcats softball team from 2005 to 2008 and won back-to-back National Championships for the Wildcats. She is the Pac-12 Conference career leader in putouts. She is currently a college athletics administrator.

== Career ==
Born in Tucson, Arizona, Balko graduated from Canyon del Oro High School in nearby Oro Valley in 2004.

At the University of Arizona, Balko played at catcher for the Arizona Wildcats softball team from 2005 to 2008. Balko debuted on February 4, 2005, against the Tulsa Hurricanes, collecting a hit and walk in her first game. As part of the team that won the 2006 Women's College World Series, Balko helped the Wildcats into the finals by helping drive in a run off National Player of The Year Cat Osterman on June 2. In the championship finale on June 6, Balko had two hits including a double and drove in 2 RBIs for the school's sixth title. For the 2007 Women's College World Series finale, Balko tallied a hit against 2007 National Player of the Year Monica Abbott as the Wildcats defeated Tennessee 5–0 on June 6. Balko singled in her last appearance on May 31, 2008, in a loss to the Alabama Crimson Tide at that year's World Series.

In January 2008, Balko was named to the watchlist for USA Softball National Player of the Year.

Balko is also a World University Games member and an Olympic Camp Tryout Invitee. Balko was signed as an undrafted free agent by the National Pro Fastpitch team Washington Glory, and had her debut for the team in June 2008. After a few months on the term, she returned to Tucson.

In January 2012, Balko became Alumni Letterwinners Development Assistant with the University of Arizona athletics department. She later became Senior Director of Regional Development.

== Personal life ==
In 2015, Balko married Ricky Elmore, an NFL defensive end who played college football at Arizona.

== Statistics ==
|+Arizona Wildcats

YEAR	G	AB	R	H	BA	RBI	HR	3B	2B	TB	SLG	BB	SO	SB	SBA
2005	51	146	12	30	.205	23	5	1	7	54	.370%	18	50	0	0
2006	65	178	26	48	.269	44	13	0	7	94	.528%	34	65	3	4
2007	65	186	31	43	.231	32	10	0	3	76	.408%	22	55	4	5
2008	57	160	31	42	.262	39	15	1	10	99	.618%	29	53	0	2
TOTALS	238	670	100	163	.243	138	43	2	27	323	.482%	103	223	7	11
