= Doomsday cult =

Cult that believes in apocalypticism and millenarianism

A doomsday cult is a cult that believes in apocalypticism and millenarianism, including both those that predict disaster and those that attempt to destroy the entire universe. Sociologist John Lofland coined the term in his 1966 study Doomsday Cult: A Study of Conversion, Proselytization, and Maintenance of Faith, about a group of members belonging to the Unification Church of the United States. In 1958, Leon Festinger published a study of a group with cataclysmic predictions: When Prophecy Fails: A Social and Psychological Study of a Modern Group that Predicted the Destruction of the World.

The phenomenon of continued commitment to the "doomsday cult", even after the prophecy fails, has been attributed to the coping method of dissonance reduction, a form of rationalization. Members often dedicate themselves with renewed vigor to the group's cause after a failed prophecy, rationalizing with explanations such as a belief that their actions forestalled the disaster or a continued belief in the leader when the date for disaster is postponed. Some researchers believe that the use of the term by the government and the news media can lead to a self-fulfilling prophecy, in which actions by authorities reinforces the apocalyptic beliefs of the group, which in turn can inspire further controversial actions. Group leaders have themselves objected to comparisons between one group and another, and parallels have been drawn between the concept of a self-fulfilling prophecy and the theory of a deviancy amplification spiral.

== Etymology ==
The term "doomsday cult" was first used in the title of a 1966 scholarly study of a group of Unification Church members by John Lofland, entitled: Doomsday Cult: A Study of Conversion, Proselytization, and Maintenance of Faith. In 1958, Leon Festinger published a study of a group with cataclysmic predictions: When Prophecy Fails: A Social and Psychological Study of a Modern Group that Predicted the Destruction of the World.

Lofland published his findings in 1964 as a doctoral thesis entitled: "The World Savers: A Field Study of Cult Processes," and in 1966 in book form by Prentice-Hall. It is considered to be one of the most important and widely cited studies of the process of religious conversion, and one of the first modern sociological studies of a new religious movement. James Richardson writes in the Encyclopedia of Religion and Society that after the publication of Lofland's work, "The term doomsday cult has become a part of everyday parlance, used by the media to refer to apocalyptic religious groups."

== Psychological studies ==
A psychological research study by Festinger, Riecken, and Schachter found that people turned to a cataclysmic world view after they had repeatedly failed to find meaning in mainstream movements. Leon Festinger and his colleagues had observed members of the group for several months, and recorded their conversations both prior to and after a failed prophecy from their charismatic leader. The group had organized around a belief system which foretold that a majority of the Western Hemisphere would be destroyed by a cataclysmic flood on December 21, 1955. Their work was later published in the 1956 book When Prophecy Fails: A Social and Psychological Study of a Modern Group that Predicted the Destruction of the World.

Social scientists have found that while some group members will leave after the date for a doomsday prediction by the leader has passed uneventfully, others actually feel their belief and commitment to the group strengthened. Often when a group's doomsday prophecies or predictions fail to come true, the group leader will simply set a new date for impending doom, or predict a different type of catastrophe on a different date. Niederhoffer and Kenner say: "When you have gone far out on a limb and so many people have followed you, and there is much 'sunk cost,' as economists would say, it is difficult to admit you have been wrong."

Festinger and other researchers have attempted to explain the commitment of members to their doomsday cult after the leader's prophecies have proven false. Festinger attributed this phenomenon to the coping method of dissonance reduction, a form of rationalization. Members often dedicate themselves with renewed vigor to the group's cause after a failed prophecy, rationalizing with explanations such as a belief that their actions forestalled the disaster or a continued belief in the leader when the date for disaster is postponed.

In Experiments With People: Revelations from Social Psychology, Abelson, Frey and Gregg explain this further: "...continuing to proselytize on behalf of a doomsday cult whose prophecies have been disconfirmed, although it makes little logical sense, makes plenty of psychological sense if people have already spent months proselytizing on the cult's behalf. Persevering allows them to avoid the embarrassment of how wrong they were in the first place." The common-held belief in a catastrophic event occurring on a future date can have the effect of ingraining followers with a sense of uniqueness and purpose. In addition, after a failed prophecy members may attempt to explain the outcome through rationalization and dissonance reduction.

Explanations may include stating that the group members had misinterpreted the leader's original plan, that the cataclysmic event itself had been postponed to a later date by the leader, or that the activities of the group itself had forestalled disaster. In the case of the Festinger study, when the prophecy of a cataclysmic flood was proved false, the members pronounced that their faith in God had prevented the event. They then proceeded to attempt to convert new members with renewed strength.

In his book Politeia: Visions of the Just Society, Eric Carlton debates whether or not the term is appropriate to describe these types of groups. Carlton writes that the event is only seen as a "doomsday" for the "wicked and unrepentant," whereas members of the group itself often regard it as a "day of deliverance," or a "renewal of the world." He regards these groups as "the ultimate in exclusivity," and while the future will be bleak for nonbelievers due to an unforeseen cataclysm, members of the group are promised existence in a new utopia.

== Media coverage ==
In Globalisation and the Future of Terrorism, Brynjar Lia notes that "Doomsday cults are nothing new," but also states that they are "relatively few." In Mystics and Messiahs, Jenkins writes that as a result of events between 1993 and 1997 including the Waco Siege involving the Branch Davidians, violence involving the Order of the Solar Temple, Aum Shinrikyo's sarin gas attack on the Tokyo subway, and the Heaven's Gate incident, "Reporting on so-called doomsday cults became a mainstay of the media, just as satanic cults had been a decade before." Jenkins regards the Order of the Solar Temple as more of an example of organized crime than a doomsday cult.

In Yakuza: Japan's Criminal Underworld, the authors also make a comparison to organized crime, writing that Aum Shinrikyo "...often resembled a profit-hungry racketeering gang more than a fanatic doomsday cult." In James R. Lewis' The Order of the Solar Temple, Jean-François Mayer writes that the media made use of the term doomsday cult to characterize the movement, though former members and outsiders did not know what kind of event would occur. Some see the use of the term itself as a self-fulfilling prophecy, where the characterization of being called a doomsday cult may actually affect the outcome of violent events related to the group. The Canadian Security Intelligence Service Report on Doomsday Religious Cults reported:

Sanctions applied by authorities are often interpreted by a movement as hostile to its existence, which reinforces their apocalyptic beliefs and leads to further withdrawal, mobilization and deviant actions, and which in turn elicits heavier sanctions by authorities. This unleashes a spiral of amplification, as each action amplifies each action, and the use of violence is facilitated as the group believes this will ultimately actualize its doomsday scenario."

Eileen Barker has compared these concepts to the notion of a deviancy amplification spiral in the media and its effects on new religious movements, and James Richardson has also discussed this effect. In the case of the Concerned Christians, use of the term "doomsday cult" as a characterization of the group served as a justification for deportation of its members by the Israeli government.

In the book The Copycat Effect: How the Media and Popular Culture Trigger the Mayhem in Tomorrow's Headlines, author Loren Coleman discusses the effect the media can have on the seemingly innocuous intentions of a French doomsday cult, Néo-Phare. On September 5, 2002, Arnaud Mussy told his followers based in Nantes, France to look forward to voyagers from Venus who would collect them before the end of the world on October 24, 2002. Though Mussy denied any plans for a mass suicide, both police and the media drew parallels to the Order of the Solar Temple. In Apocalypse Observed, authors Hall and Schuyler discuss the effect the media had on the events surrounding the Order of the Solar Temple group.

== See also ==
- Cult
- Jehovah's Witnesses
- Iglesia ni Cristo
- Aum Shinrikyo
- Dami Mission
- Moral panic
- New religious movement
