= Internalization (sociology) =

Outside influences becoming a part of the self

In sociology and other social sciences, internalization (or internalisation) means an individual's acceptance of a set of norms and values (established by others) through socialisation.

John Finley Scott described internalization as a metaphor in which something (i.e. an idea, concept, action) moves from outside the mind or personality to a place inside of it. The structure and the happenings of society shapes one's inner self and it can also be reversed.

The process of internalization starts with learning what the norms are, and then the individual goes through a process of understanding why they are of value or why they make sense, until finally they accept the norm as their own viewpoint. Internalised norms are part of an individual's personality and may be exhibited by one's moral actions. However, internal commitment to a norm can also be distinct from what one exhibits externally. George Mead illustrates, through the constructs of mind and self, the manner in which an individual's internalizations are affected by external norms.

One thing that may affect what an individual internalises are role models. Role models often speed up the process of socialisation and encourage internalization: if an individual sees someone they respect endorse a particular set of norms, that individual is more likely to be prepared to accept, and so internalise, those norms. This is the process of identification. Internalization helps one define who they are and create their own identity and values within a society that has already created a norm set of values and practices for them.

According to the Oxford American Dictionary, to internalise is to "make (attitudes or behavior) part of one's nature by learning or unconscious assimilation: people learn gender stereotypes and internalize them". Through internalization individuals accept a set of norms and values that are established by other individuals, groups, or society as a whole.

In psychology, internalization is the outcome of a conscious mind reasoning about a specific subject; the subject is internalized, and the consideration of the subject is internal. Internalization of ideals might take place following religious conversion, or in the process of, more generally, moral conversion. Internalization is directly associated with learning within an organism (or business) and recalling what has been learned.

In psychology and sociology, internalization involves the integration of attitudes, values, standards and the opinions of others into one's own identity or sense of self. In psychoanalytic theory, internalization is a process involving the formation of the super ego. Many theorists believe that the internalized values of behavior implemented during early socialization are key factors in predicting a child's future moral character. The self-determination theory proposes a motivational continuum from the extrinsic to intrinsic motivation and autonomous self-regulation. Some research suggests a child's moral self starts to develop around age three. These early years of socialization may be the underpinnings of moral development in later childhood. Proponents of this theory suggest that children whose view of self is "good and moral" tend to have a developmental trajectory toward pro-social behavior and few signs of anti-social behavior.

In one child developmental study, researchers examined two key dimensions of early conscience – internalization of rules of conduct and empathic affects to others – as factors that may predict future social, adaptive and competent behavior. Data was collected from a longitudinal study of children, from two parent families, at age 25, 38, 52, 67 and 80 months. Children's internalization of each parent's rules and empathy toward each parent's simulated distress were observed at 25, 38 and 52 months. Parents and teachers rated their adaptive, competent, pro-social behavior and anti-social behavior at 80 months. The researchers found that first, both the history of the child's early internalization of parental rules and the history of their empathy predicted the children's competent and adaptive functioning at 80 months, as rated by parents and teachers. Second, children with stronger histories of internalization of parental rules from 25 to 52 months perceived themselves as more moral at 67 months. Third, the children that showed stronger internalization from 25 to 52 months came to see themselves as more moral and "good". These self-perceptions, in turn, predicted the way parents and teachers would rate their competent and adaptive functioning at 80 months.

Lev Vygotsky, a pioneer of psychological studies, introduced the idea of internalization in his extensive studies of child development research. Vygotsky provides an alternate definition for internalization, the internal reconstruction of an external operation. He explains three stages of internalization:

1. An operation that initially represents an external activity is reconstructed and begins to occur internally.
2. An interpersonal process is transformed into an intrapersonal one.
3. The transformation of an interpersonal process into an intrapersonal one is the result of a long series of developmental events.

== See also ==
- Externalization (psychology)
- Introjection
- Cultural homogenization
- Social influence
