= Há Dois Mil Anos =

- Author: Francisco Cândido Xavier / Emmanuel (spirit)
- Language: Brazilian Portuguese
- Series: Historical Novels of Emmanuel
- Subject: Episodes of the History of Christianity in the 1st Century
- Genre: Spiritist novel, Historical fiction
- Publisher: Federação Espírita Brasileira (FEB)
- Publication date: 1939
- Publication place: Brazil
- Media type: Print
- Pages: 441 (original edition)
- ISBN: 978-8573286977
- Followed by: Cinquenta Anos Depois

Há Dois Mil Anos (English: Two Thousand Years Ago) is a Spiritist novel psychographed by the Brazilian medium Francisco Cândido Xavier, with authorship attributed to the spirit Emmanuel, and originally published in 1939 by the Brazilian Spiritist Federation (FEB).

With the subtitle Episodes of the History of Christianity in the 1st Century, the work is a milestone in Brazilian mediumistic literature. The narrative details the main events in the life of the proud Roman senator Publius Lentulus (who, according to Spiritist doctrine, was one of the incarnations of the spiritual author himself, Emmanuel), covering his encounter with Jesus, the healing of his daughter who had contracted leprosy, and the conversion of his wife, Livia, to Early Christianity.

Considered a classic of Spiritist literature, Há Dois Mil Anos is included among the ten best Spiritist books published in the 20th century, according to a 1999 survey by the Candeia Spiritist Organization of Diffusion and Culture (Candeia Organização Espírita de Difusão e Cultura). It remains one of the most read novels of the genre in Brazil, with over one million copies sold and translations into several languages.

== Context and authorship ==
The narrative marks the debut of the spirit Emmanuel in the historical novel genre, inaugurating one of the most striking phases of Chico Xavier's psychography. In the work, dictated in the late 1930s while the medium lived in Pedro Leopoldo, Minas Gerais, Emmanuel presents himself detailing the events of his own existence in Ancient Rome as the senator Publius Lentulus.

The novel intertwines fictional characters with major historical figures and documented events, such as the government of Pontius Pilate in Judea, political persecutions in Rome, the destruction of Jerusalem by Titus's troops in 70 AD, and the devastating eruption of Mount Vesuvius that destroyed the city of Pompeii in 79 AD. For scholars of Spiritist literature, the wealth of historical details, Roman customs, and topographical precision presented by a medium who, at the time, only had a primary school education, is frequently cited as one of the great indications of the work's mediumistic authenticity.

== Theme and plot ==
As is structural to Spiritist novels, the story of Há Dois Mil Anos serves as a moral epic that deeply explores the law of cause and effect (or Karma). Starting from the protagonist's mistakes, the story demonstrates how negative human inclinations, exacerbated skepticism, and the abuse of power hinder spiritual evolution.

The beginning of the book portrays the luxurious daily life and relentless personality of Lentulus, his friendship with Flaminius Severus, and describes the intrigues of the Roman political scene. The plot's conflict intensifies through the arrogant way the senator interacts with slaves, underestimating the new ideas brought by nascent Christianity. The dramatic turning point occurs when his daughter, Flavia, contracts leprosy. In despair, Lentulus seeks the help of Jesus of Nazareth. However, even after witnessing the miraculous healing of his daughter by Christ, Publius allows his material ties and political pride to prevail.

His refusal to transform himself inwardly generates disastrous consequences: he becomes the target of criminal plots driven by the envy and lust of the antagonist Fulvia, resulting in irreversible damage to his marriage with the dedicated Livia. The work culminates in a climax of tragedy, suffering, and subsequent expiation, highlighting themes such as revenge, forgiveness, repentance, and the inevitability of divine justice.

== Main characters ==
- Publius Lentulus: A wealthy and proud Roman senator, protagonist of the work and identified as an incarnation of the text's dictating spirit himself, Emmanuel. He is a symbol of skepticism and attachment to power.
- Livia: Wife of Publius Lentulus. A woman of pure and compassionate heart, she converts to early Christianity, facing terrible calumnies and painful trials imposed by the conspirators of the Roman court.
- Flavia and Marcus: Children of the couple. Flavia is cured of leprosy through the direct intervention of Jesus, serving as the pivot for the encounter between the senator and Christ.
- Fulvia: The main antagonist, representing the peak of Roman vanity, malice, and moral corruption. Her schemes, driven by unrequited passions, aim to destroy Livia and Publius's marriage.
- Flaminius Severus: A Roman patrician and great friend of Publius Lentulus, whose loyalty is explored in the first act of the work.
- Ana and Simeão: Servants and followers of the Christian path who assist in Livia's conversion.

== Impact, translations, and legacy ==
Há Dois Mil Anos has consolidated itself as a true religious best-seller in Brazil. Over more than eight decades of continuous publication by FEB, the book has surpassed the mark of 1 million printed copies. The work's relevance has transcended Brazilian borders, earning translations into Spanish, English, French, and Esperanto, becoming an important vehicle for the international dissemination of Kardecist Spiritism.

The book is frequently used in Spiritist study groups due to its rich lessons on resignation and the early days of Christianity, in addition to laying the foundations for understanding the concept of successive lives and reincarnational planning from the Spiritist perspective.

=== The "Romances of Emmanuel" series ===
Há Dois Mil Anos was the inaugural volume of a renowned pentalogy psychographed by Chico Xavier—popularly called the "Historical Novels of Emmanuel" (Romances Históricos de Emmanuel)—which revisits the incarnations of the spiritual author and the development of Christianity in the first and subsequent centuries of the Christian era. The interconnected series continues in the following works:

1. Há Dois Mil Anos (1939) - Focus on the 1st century.
2. Cinquenta Anos Depois (1940) - Focus on the early 2nd century, following Emmanuel's incarnation as the slave Nestório.
3. Paulo e Estêvão (1941) - Focus on the beginnings of Christianity through the life of the Apostle Paul.
4. Renúncia (1944) - Set in the 17th century (the Inquisition and persecutions in Europe).
5. Ave, Cristo! (1953) - Set in the 3rd century.

== Adaptations ==
The dramatic depth and popular success of the narrative have yielded dozens of adaptations for the theater, being staged by various companies throughout Brazil for decades. Among the most notable and long-lasting productions are the one by Cia de Teatro Luz no Palco, adapted and directed by actor and director Rodrigo Ciambroni, and the acclaimed adaptation by the Projeto Teatral Gabriel Veiga Catellani, which has traveled across several states in the country, attracting thousands of spectators, including non-Spiritist audiences.

== Structure of the work ==
The work is divided into two parts, totaling twenty chapters that mark the temporal and geographical transitions of the plot:

Part One:

1. Two Friends (Dois amigos)
2. A Slave (Um escravo)
3. In Pilate's House (Em casa de Pilatos)
4. In Galilee (Na Galileia)
5. The Messiah of Nazareth (O Messias de Nazaré)
6. The Abduction (O rapto)
7. The Preachings of Tiberias (As pregações do Tiberíades)
8. On the Great Day of Calvary (No grande dia do Calvário)
9. The Victorious Calumny (A calúnia vitoriosa)
10. The Apostle of Samaria (O Apóstolo da Samaria)

Part Two:

1. The Death of Flaminius (A morte de Flamínio)
2. Shadows and Nuptials (Sombras e núpcias)
3. Plans of the Darkness (Planos da treva)
4. Tragedies and Hopes (Tragédias e esperanças)
5. In the Catacombs of Faith and in the Circus of Martyrdom (Nas catacumbas da fé e no circo do martírio)
6. Dawns of the Kingdom of the Lord (Alvoradas do Reino do Senhor)
7. Webs of Misfortune (Teias do infortúnio)
8. At the Destruction of Jerusalem (Na destruição de Jerusalém)
9. Bitter Memories (Lembranças amargas)
10. In the Last Minutes of Pompeii (Nos derradeiros minutos de Pompeia)

== See also ==
- Emmanuel (spirit)
- Kardecist spiritism
- Spiritist literature
