= Doomsday Cult: A Study of Conversion, Proselytization, and Maintenance of Faith =

1966 sociological book by John Lofland

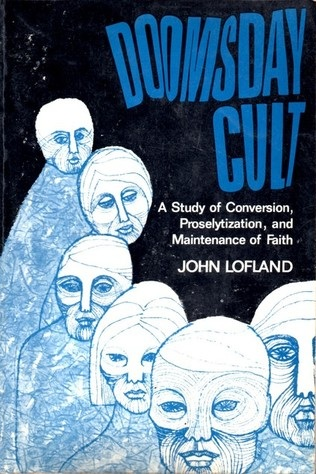
- Author: John Lofland
- Language: English
- Subject: Unification Church
- Publisher: Prentice-Hall
- Publication date: 1966
- Publication place: United States
- ISBN: 0-8290-0095-X
- OCLC: 372242

Doomsday Cult: A Study of Conversion, Proselytization, and Maintenance of Faith is a sociological book based on field study of a group of Unification Church members in California and Oregon. It was first published in 1966 and written by the sociologist John Lofland. It is considered one of the most important and widely cited studies of the process of religious conversion, and one of the first modern sociological studies of a new religious movement.

While a student at the University of California, Berkeley, Lofland lived with Unification Church missionary Young Oon Kim and a small group of American church members and studied their activities in trying to promote their beliefs and win new members for their church. Lofland noted that most of their efforts were ineffective and that most of the people who joined did so because of personal relationships with other members, often family relationships. Lofland published his findings in 1964 as a doctoral thesis titled The World Savers: A Field Study of Cult Processes, and in 1966 in book form by Prentice-Hall. The book introduced the expression "doomsday cult" into English, and since then the expression has been commonly used in various contexts.

== See also ==
- Unification Church of the United States
- Participant observation
- Young Oon Kim
