= Cinquenta Anos Depois =

- Author: Emmanuel (attributed)
- Language: Portuguese
- Series: Emmanuel's Historical Novels
- Subject: Early Christianity, Roman Empire, Spiritism
- Genre: Historical fiction, Spiritist literature
- Publisher: Brazilian Spiritist Federation (FEB)
- Publication date: 1940
- Publication place: Brazil
- Pages: 349
- ISBN: 978-8573286984
- Preceded by: Two Thousand Years Ago
- Followed by: Paul and Stephen

Cinquenta Anos Depois (English: Fifty Years Later) is a historical and spiritist novel psychographed by the Brazilian medium Chico Xavier, with authorship attributed to the spirit Emmanuel. It was first published in 1940 by the Brazilian Spiritist Federation (FEB).

The work is the second installment in Emmanuel's series of historical novels—preceded by Two Thousand Years Ago (1939) and followed by Paulo e Estêvão (1942), Renúncia (1944) e Ave, Cristo! (1953). The book portrays Roman society and the expansion of early Christianity during the 2nd century AD, during the reigns of Emperors Hadrian and Antoninus Pius.

== Historical and thematic context ==
The narrative is set in the mid-2nd century (approximately between 131 AD and 185 AD), a period marked by the consolidation of Roman provincial administration under the Nerva–Antonine dynasty and the underground expansion of Christian communities within the Catacombs of Rome and key urban centers such as Ephesus and Alexandria.

Through the lens of Spiritist doctrine, the novel addresses spiritual evolution and the principle of reincarnation governed by the law of cause and effect. The main characters reappear in social roles opposite to those in Two Thousand Years Ago, contrasting nobility and servitude within the Roman social hierarchy.

== Plot summary ==
=== Reincarnation of Nestorius ===
Fifty years after the events narrated in Two Thousand Years Ago, the spirit previously incarnated as the proud Roman senator Publius Lentulus reincarnates in 131 AD in Ephesus as Nestorius (Portuguese: Nestório), a Jewish man converted to Christianity who is reduced to slavery by Roman patricians.

Brought to Rome as a slave, Nestorius experiences manual labor, physical hardship, and social degradation, serving as a spiritual counterweight to the arbitrary power he exercised in his previous existence. Having been converted to Christianity since his youth, Nestorius becomes a preceptor and underground preacher in the Roman catacombs. Separated from his enslaved son Cyrus (Ciro), he reunites with him years later during a secret Christian gathering. Condemned to death for refusing to offer sacrifices to the pagan gods and the emperor, Nestorius suffers martyrdom. In the novel's spiritual depiction, he is reunited in the afterlife with his former wife, Livia.

=== The journey of Célia Lucius (Saint Marina) ===
Parallel to Nestorius's path, the principal storyline follows Célia Lucius, a young Roman patrician who embraces the Christian faith. Victim of slanders and family intrigues, Célia is unjustly cast out of her home by her father, Helvius Lucius.

To protect her physical and spiritual integrity while pursuing a dedicated religious life, Célia disguises herself in male attire and takes refuge in a monastery near Alexandria, Egypt, assuming the identity of "Brother Marinus" (Irmão Marinho). In the monastic community, she devotes herself to serving the sick and the destitute with complete selflessness.

Falsely accused of impregnating a local woman, Célia silently accepts excommunication and expulsion from the monastery, raising the child herself without disclosing her female sex. Only after her death do the monks discover her true gender and heroic sacrifice. The narrative attributes to Célia the historical origin of the hagiographical tradition of Saint Marina (or Marinos of Alexandria), preserved in both Catholic and Eastern Orthodox traditions.

== Main characters ==
- Nestorius (Nestório): A Jewish-Christian slave in Ephesus; the reincarnation of the Roman senator Publius Lentulus.
- Célia Lucius (Brother Marinus / Saint Marina): A Roman patrician and the moral protagonist of the novel, who lives disguised as a monk near Alexandria.
- Helvius Lucius (Hélvio Lucius): Célia's father, a Roman nobleman representing the imperial aristocracy.
- Cyrus (Ciro): Nestorius's son, separated from his father in childhood and later reunited through underground Christian meetings.
- Livia (Lívia): A spiritual figure present in Nestorius's visions at the end of his life, maintaining narrative continuity from Two Thousand Years Ago.

== Reception and critical analysis ==
In the historiography of Spiritist literature in Brazil, Emmanuel's historical novels are highlighted by scholars as foundational texts shaping the moral and doctrinal imagination of Brazilian Spiritism.

Sociologists and historians of religion note that the novel utilizes the structure of 19th-century romantic historical fiction to connect early Christian historiography with the theological principles of Allan Kardec's Spiritist codification. The work is also cited in comparative studies of Christian hagiography, examining how literary Spiritist works adapt medieval Alexandrian and Byzantine legends, such as the life of Saint Marina (or Saint Margaret of Antioch).

== See also ==
- Chico Xavier
- Spiritism
- Spiritist literature
- Saint Marina the Monk
- Early Christianity

== Bibliography ==
- Arribas, Célia da Graça (2010). Afonso e Chico: a construção da literatura espírita no Brasil (Ph.D. thesis). University of São Paulo.
- Farmer, David Hugh (2011). The Oxford Dictionary of Saints (5th ed.). Oxford: Oxford University Press. ISBN 978-0199596607.
- Souto, Rogério da Silva (2012). A narrativa espírita e a história: uma análise dos romances de Emmanuel psicografados por Chico Xavier (Master's thesis). Federal University of Juiz de Fora.
- Tavares, Flávio (2014). Célia Lucius, Santa Marina: estudo histórico-espírita. Belo Horizonte: Vinha de Luz. ISBN 978-8563467188.
- Xavier, Francisco Cândido (1940). Cinquenta Anos Depois: episódios da história do Cristianismo no século II. Rio de Janeiro: Federação Espírita Brasileira. ISBN 978-8573286984.
