= Paulo e Estêvão =

- Author: Chico Xavier (attributed to the spirit Emmanuel)
- Original title: Paulo e Estêvão: Episódios Históricos do Cristianismo Primitivo
- Language: Portuguese
- Series: Historical Novels of Emmanuel
- Subject: Early Christianity, lives of Paul of Tarsus and Stephen
- Genre: Historical novel, Spiritist literature
- Publisher: Brazilian Spiritist Federation
- Publication date: 1941
- Publication place: Brazil
- Pages: 576 (commemorative edition)
- ISBN: 978-8573288483
- Preceded by: Fifty Years Later
- Followed by: Renúncia

Paulo e Estêvão (English: Paul and Stephen; subtitled Historical Episodes from Early Christianity) is a historical novel and a work of Spiritist literature, psychographed by the Brazilian medium Chico Xavier. The spiritual authorship of the work is attributed to the spirit Emmanuel. It was originally published in 1941 by the Brazilian Spiritist Federation (Federação Espírita Brasileira - FEB).

Considered a classic of Spiritist literature and one of Xavier's works with the greatest literary and theological impact, the book narrates the trajectory of Paul of Tarsus (Saul) from 34 AD (approximately one year after the crucifixion of Jesus) until his martyrdom in Rome in 64 AD, intertwining his life with that of Stephen, the first Christian martyr.

With over 1.5 million copies sold in Brazil, the work has been translated into several languages, including Spanish, English, French, and Esperanto. Its historical relevance was ratified in 1999, when it was elected the second-best Spiritist book published in the 20th century in a national poll.

== Historical context and authorship ==
In the early 1940s, Chico Xavier was consolidating his position as a prominent medium in Brazil, having already published Parnaso de Além-Túmulo (1932) and the renowned historical novel Two Thousand Years Ago (1939). Paulo e Estêvão was psychographed in Pedro Leopoldo, Minas Gerais, and required an intense physical and mental effort from the medium, according to his biographers, due to the density of the historical information narrated.

Chronologically, the narrative is based on the biblical book of the Acts of the Apostles and the Pauline epistles. According to the preface signed by Emmanuel, the objective of the book is not to supplant the canonical texts, but to offer a "deeper meaning" and to fill biographical and psychological gaps, especially regarding the conversion of Saul of Tarsus and his spiritual relationship with Stephen.

== Plot ==
The work is structured into two main parts, tracing the protagonist's arc of redemption:

=== First part: The persecutions of Saul ===
The narrative begins in Corinth, Greece, around 34 AD. The plot introduces the siblings Jeziel and Abigail, young Jews whose family is destroyed after their father falls victim to cruel local financial and political conspiracies. Enslaved in the galleys after his family's ruin, Jeziel manages to be clandestinely freed and takes refuge in Jerusalem, where he adopts the name Stephen to avoid recapture. In the city, he joins the House of Neophytes (known as the Church of the Way), led by Simon Peter and dedicated to caring for the sick and needy.

Meanwhile, the strict Pharisee and doctor of the law, Saul of Tarsus, travels to Jerusalem with the intention of extirpating the nascent Christian movement, which he considers a dangerous heresy to Judaism. Destiny places Saul and Stephen on a course of intellectual and religious collision. Saul leads the process that culminates in the arrest and stoning of Stephen. The serene death of the martyr, who asks God to forgive his executioners, deeply shakes the Pharisee's convictions. The shock worsens when Saul discovers that Stephen was, in fact, the missing brother of Abigail, his fiancée. Overcome by profound suffering, Abigail falls ill and dies shortly after, reaffirming her Christian faith on her deathbed.

=== Second part: The mission of the Apostle ===
Driven by grief and still seeking to suppress his crisis of conscience, Saul travels to Damascus with letters of authorization to arrest the local Christians. On the road, the famous vision of Jesus occurs, leaving him temporarily blind. Welcomed by Ananias, whom he had previously intended to arrest, Saul regains his sight and converts definitively.

Adopting the name Paul (meaning "small" or "humble"), the protagonist relinquishes his social position and begins an arduous missionary journey. The narrative follows his travels across the Mediterranean, describing the founding of the first Gentile churches in Antioch, Ephesus, Athens, and Corinth. The novel details the complex debate at the Council of Jerusalem, where Paul defends the exemption of circumcision for non-Jews, universalizing Christianity.

During his missions, which are fraught with desertions, physical persecutions, and stonings, Paul is frequently supported by the spiritual inspiration of Stephen and Abigail. The book culminates with his imprisonment in Rome under the empire of Nero and his death by decapitation. Upon his death, the narrative describes his awakening in the spiritual realm, where he is warmly received by Abigail, Stephen, and finally, Jesus himself.

== Main characters ==
- Saul of Tarsus / Paul: The protagonist. A man of brilliant intellect and intense passions, whose journey goes from dogmatic arrogance to extreme humility and sacrifice in the name of the Gospel.
- Jeziel / Stephen: A young man of profound spiritual wisdom and oratory. The first Christian martyr and Paul's spiritual guide after his passing.
- Abigail: Jeziel's sister and the great love of Saul's youth. Her purity and tragic death serve as a spiritual link for Saul's redemption.
- Simon Peter: Presented as the paternal and cautious leader of the church in Jerusalem, frequently in diplomatic tension with Paul's missionary audacity.
- Ananias: The wise Christian shoemaker of Damascus who cures Saul's blindness and introduces him to the teachings of the Way.
- Barnabas, Luke, and Timothy: Main co-workers and friends of Paul in his evangelical travels to the Gentiles.

== Reception and cultural impact ==
At the end of 1999, an extensive poll promoted among Spiritist institutions and readers throughout Brazil was tasked with electing the "Ten Best Spiritist Books of the 20th Century" (excluding the works of Allan Kardec, which belong to the 19th century). In this renowned list, Paulo e Estêvão was elected the 2nd best book of the century, behind only Nosso Lar (also psychographed by Chico Xavier). The award solidified the importance of Emmanuel's literary work in Christian mediumistic theology.

In academic analyses of Spiritism in Brazil, Paulo e Estêvão is frequently cited as a fundamental work for the construction of the Spiritist imaginary. The anthropologist Bernardo Lewgoy points out that Emmanuel's work nationalized and popularized the original Christian message in Brazil through a perspective that unites the ethic of resignation with social work and continuous charity.

The central themes valued in the work include:

- Law of Cause and Effect (Karma): Paul's physical suffering (such as stonings) is portrayed not as an arbitrary punishment, but as a karmic reparation for his past actions as a persecutor.
- Mediumship and Intercession: The novel illustrates how "consoling spirits" act subtly to intuit and support incarnated individuals in their missions.
- Universalism: Paul is portrayed as the main figure responsible for freeing Christianity from regional and sectarian constraints.

== Adaptations ==
The density and popularity of Paulo e Estêvão have motivated several intermedial adaptations in Brazil:

- Theater: The work has been extensively adapted by theater companies. Notable productions include the large-scale musical Paulo e Estêvão - O Musical, as well as the dramatic play Uma Mulher, um Olhar: Abigail, Paulo e Estêvão, presented on stages across Brazil.
- Media and Audio: The book was adapted into radio soap operas and audio drama formats with the support of the Brazilian Spiritist Federation, reaching audiences with visual impairments.

== See also ==
- Chico Xavier
- Spiritism
- Spiritist literature
- Há Dois Mil Anos
- Cinquenta Anos Depois
