= Perispirit =

Spiritism concept

In Spiritism, perispirit or perisprit is the subtle body that is used by the spirit to connect with the perceptions created by the brain. The term is found among the extensive terminology originally devised by Allan Kardec in his books about Spiritism. Its first use was in a commentary (by Kardec) to the answer given by the spirits to the 93rd question of The Spirits Book:

Is the spirit, properly so called, without a covering, or is it, as some declare, surrounded by a substance of some kind?
"The spirit is enveloped in a substance which would appear to you as mere vapor, but which, nevertheless, appears very gross to us, thought it is sufficiently vaporous to allow the spirit to float in the atmosphere, and to transport himself through space at pleasure."

As the germ of a fruit is surrounded by the perisperm so the spirit, properly so called, is surrounded by an envelope which, by analogy, may be designated as the perispirit.

Kardec was compelled to develop further the notion, especially by given "scientific" fundamentation to his theory. He studied the properties of what was then called "fluids" (electricity, magnetism, heat) and broadened the research towards those he termed "psychic" or "spiritual fluids". Both terms, especially the previous have stuck and are still used (or abused) up to now.

== Properties ==
In Kardec's later conception, found in The Book on Mediums, he described the perispirit (then assumed as "technical term") in terms of a "fluidic body" with the following properties:

- It is made of the "Universal Cosmic Fluid", which in different densities and states, is the source of all matter;
- It enclosed the spirit proper;
- It gave the spirit an appearance drawn from his previous life and his current state, serving as a shape by which spirits saw each other;
- It sends forth "fluidic" emanations that can affect those around;
- Being "subtle" and semi-material, it was able to act as a bond between the physical body (material) and the spirit (immaterial);
- It allowed the spirit to act over matter other than that of its body, to some extent;
- It is constantly under change, as the spirit progresses and may eventually be harmed, even destroyed.
- It won't be necessary any more when all spirits attain perfection.

== Importance for mediumship ==
The perispirit plays a key role in the phenomenon of mediumship, which actually involves the interaction of the perispirit of the medium and that of a disembodied spirit. When invited to our plane of existence by a medium, "spirits who inhabit worlds of higher degree than ours ... are obliged to clothe themselves with" a garment composed of perispirit. "The most elevated spirits, when they come to visit us, assume a terrestrial perispirit, which they retain during their stay among us". "According to Kardec, it is through the perispirit that disincarnate spirits ... can move objects." (Thus, the perispirit is responsible for poltergeist manifestations.)

== New-Age conception ==
Due to syncretism, some variations of spiritism accept the perispirit as an actual "body" possessing power centres, defined more or less in the same way that Theosophy and Yoga define the Chakras, thus making the concept of perispirit similar to that of an astral body, a concept that was unknown to Kardec.

According to this orientalizing view, the perispirit had the function of modelling the physical body ("soma" [in Greek; "deha" in Sanskrit]) after the design determined by the karma, with each chakra linking itself to a gland and to the nervous system. This perispirit would use the chakras to command the body and to receive sensorial impressions from it.

== Garment of soul in Gnosticism ==
In Mandaic soteriology, the soul of the dead, upon entering the House of Life, "receives a garment and a wreath." (Here, the "garment" = perispirit; and the "wreath" = halo.)

The "metaphor of soul as garment" is a commonplace in Russian mysticism.
