= Religious conversion =

Adoption of religious beliefs

Religious conversion is the adoption of a set of beliefs identified with one particular religious denomination to the exclusion of others. Thus "religious conversion" would describe the abandoning of adherence to one denomination and affiliating with another. This might be from one to another denomination within the same religion, for example, from Protestant Christianity to Roman Catholicism or from Shi'a Islam to Sunni Islam. In some cases, religious conversion "marks a transformation of religious identity and is symbolized by special rituals".

People convert to a different religion for various reasons, including active conversion by free choice due to a change in beliefs, secondary conversion, deathbed conversion, conversion for convenience, marital conversion, and forced conversion. Religious conversion can also be driven by practical considerations. Historically, people have converted to evade taxes, to escape military service or to gain political representation.

Proselytism is the act of attempting to convert by persuasion another individual from a different religion or belief system. Apostate is a term used by members of a religion or denomination to refer to someone who has left that religion or denomination.

== Religion and proselytization ==
The religions of the world are divided into two groups: those that actively seek new followers (missionary religions) and those that do not (non-missionary religions). This classification dates back to a lecture given by Max Müller in 1873, and is based on whether or not a religion seeks to gain new converts. The three main religions classified as missionary religions are Buddhism, Christianity, and Islam, while the non-missionary religions include Judaism, Zoroastrianism, and Hinduism. Other religions, such as Primal Religions, Confucianism, and Taoism, may also be considered non-missionary religions.

== Abrahamic religions ==
=== Baháʼí Faith ===
In sharing their faith with others, Baháʼís are cautioned to "obtain a hearing" – meaning to make sure the person they are proposing to teach is open to hearing what they have to say. "Baháʼí pioneers", rather than attempting to supplant the cultural underpinnings of the people in their adopted communities, are encouraged to integrate into the society and apply Baháʼí principles in living and working with their neighbors.

Baháʼís recognize the divine origins of all revealed religion, and believe that these religions occurred sequentially as part of a divine plan (see Progressive revelation), with each new revelation superseding and fulfilling that of its predecessors. Baháʼís regard their own faith as the most recent (but not the last), and believe its teachings – which are centered around the principle of the oneness of humanity – are most suited to meeting the needs of a global community.

In most countries conversion is a simple matter of filling out a card stating a declaration of belief. This includes acknowledgement of Bahá'u'llah – the Founder of the Faith – as the Messenger of God for this age, awareness and acceptance of his teachings, and intention to be obedient to the institutions and laws he established.

Conversion to the Baháʼí Faith carries with it an explicit belief in the common foundation of all revealed religion, a commitment to the unity of mankind, and active service to the community at large, especially in areas that will foster unity and concord. Since the Baháʼí Faith has no clergy, converts are encouraged to be active in all aspects of community life. Even a recent convert may be elected to serve on a local Spiritual Assembly – the guiding Baháʼí institution at the community level.

=== Christianity ===
The Conversion of Saint Paul, a 1600 painting by Italian artist Caravaggio (1571–1610)

Within Christianity conversion refers variously to three different phenomena: a person becoming Christian who was previously not Christian; a Christian moving from one Christian denomination to another; a particular spiritual development, sometimes called the "second conversion", or "the conversion of the baptised".

Conversion to Christianity is the religious conversion of a previously non-Christian person to some form of Christianity. Some Christian sects require full conversion for new members regardless of any history in other Christian sects, or from certain other sects. The exact requirements vary between different churches and denominations. Baptism is traditionally seen as a sacrament of admission to Christianity. Christian baptism has some parallels with Jewish immersion by mikvah.

In the New Testament, Jesus commanded his disciples in the Great Commission to "go and make disciples of all nations". Evangelization – sharing the Gospel message or "Good News" in deed and word, is an expectation of Christians.

Conversions to Christianity have been widespread. Even Christian communities not known for proselytization, such as the Armenian Apostolic Church, are known to have accepted converts among Muslims, Yazidis, and Jews in the nineteenth century.

==== Comparison between Protestant denominations ====
While Calvinism is monergistic, like Lutherism, its monergism is through the inner calling of the Holy Spirit, which is irresistible according to the tradition. Lutherism, on the other hand, is monergistic through the means of grace, and holds the Word to be resistible. The Arminian view on salvation, unlike the other two, is synergistic, and considers salvation resistible due to the common grace of free will.

==== Latter Day Saint movement ====
Much of the theology of Latter Day Saint baptism was established during the early Latter Day Saint movement founded by Joseph Smith, Jr. According to this theology, baptism must be by immersion, for the remission of sins (meaning that through baptism, past sins are forgiven), and occurs after one has shown faith and repentance. Mormon baptism does not purport to remit any sins other than personal ones, as adherents do not believe in original sin. Latter Day Saints baptisms also occur only after an "age of accountability" which is defined as the age of eight years. The theology thus rejects infant baptism.

In addition, Latter Day Saint theology requires that baptism may only be performed with one who has been called and ordained by God with priesthood authority. Because the churches of the Latter Day Saint movement operate under a lay priesthood, children raised in a Mormon family are usually baptized by a father or close male friend or family member who has achieved the office of priest, which is conferred upon worthy male members at least 16 years old in the LDS Church.

Baptism is seen as symbolic both of Jesus' death, burial and resurrection and is also symbolic of the baptized individual putting off of the natural or sinful man and becoming spiritually reborn as a disciple of Jesus.

Membership into a Latter Day Saint church is granted only by baptism whether or not a person has been raised in the church. Latter Day Saint churches do not recognize baptisms of other faiths as valid because they believe baptisms must be performed under the church's unique authority. Thus, all who come into one of the Latter Day Saint faiths as converts are baptized, even if they have previously received baptism in another faith.

When performing a Baptism, Latter Day Saints say the following prayer before performing the ordinance:

Having been commissioned of Jesus Christ, I baptize you in the name of the Father, and of the Son, and of the Holy Ghost. Amen.

Baptisms inside and outside the temples are usually done in a baptistry, although they can be performed in any body of water in which the person may be completely immersed. The person administering the baptism must recite the prayer exactly, and immerse every part, limb, hair and clothing of the person being baptized. If there are any mistakes, or if any part of the person being baptized is not fully immersed, the baptism must be redone. In addition to the baptizer, two members of the church witness the baptism to ensure that it is performed properly.

Following baptism, Latter Day Saints receive the Gift of the Holy Ghost by the laying on of hands of a Melchizedek Priesthood holder.

Latter Day Saints hold that one may be baptized after death through the vicarious act of a living individual. Members of The Church of Jesus Christ of Latter-day Saints with a valid temple recommend (beginning in the year they turn twelve, and after being ordained to the Aaronic Priesthood for men and boys) have the opportunity to practice baptism for the dead as a missionary ritual. However, individuals for whom such baptisms are performed are not counted in figures regarding church membership statistics, such as total membership in the church, or the number of convert baptisms in a given year. Other churches of the Latter Day Saint movement also perform baptisms for the dead. This doctrine, in combination with others regarding the time between an individual's death and resurrection, also explains what happens to the righteous non-believer and the unevangelized by providing a post-mortem means of repentance and salvation.

=== Islam ===
The Shahada, or Islamic creed.

Converting to Islam requires one to declare the shahādah, the Muslim profession of faith ("There is no deity worthy of worship but Allah (Arabic word for the God); and Muhammad is the messenger of Allah"). According to Clinton Bennett, British–American scholar of Religious studies, one's declaration of the Muslim profession of faith does not imply faith in God alone, since the conversion to Islam includes other distinct Islamic beliefs as well as part of the Muslim creed (ʿaqīdah):

Technically, the Shahadah (first pillar) is the only obligatory statement of faith in Islam; however, over time a list of six items evolved, the essentials of faith (Iman Mufassal), namely: belief in God, in God's angels, scriptures, messengers, day of judgment, and God's divine decree (Al-Qadr).

In the Islamic religion, it is believed that everyone is Muslim at birth. Due to this, those who convert are typically referred to as reverts. In Islam, the practice of Islamic circumcision is considered a sunnah custom, not a requirement for conversion and there is a valid difference of opinion on whether it is fard (obligatory) or not. The majority of clerical opinions holds that circumcision is not required upon entering the Muslim faith. In the Sunnī branch of Islam, the Shāfiʿī and Ḥanbalī schools regard male circumcision obligatory for Muslims, while the Mālikī and Ḥanafī schools regard it as non-binding and only a recommendation.

=== Judaism ===
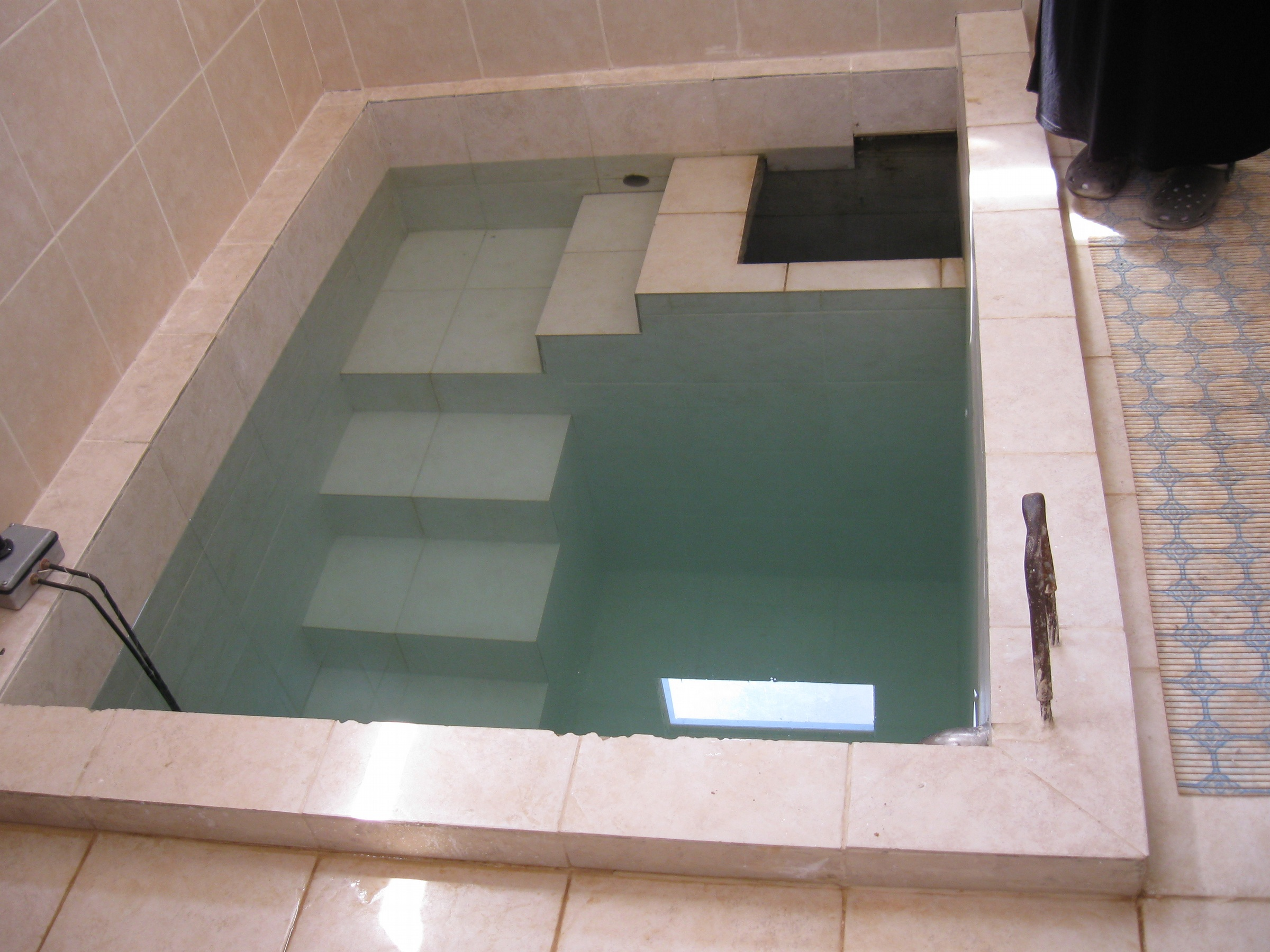
The traditional normative conversion process to Judaism (gijur) of one, two or more years is finalized with ritual immersion in a natural collection of water, e.g. a river, a lake, or a mikveh.

Conversion to Judaism is the religious conversion of non-Jews to become members of the Jewish religion and Jewish ethnoreligious community. The procedure and requirements for conversion depend on the sponsoring denomination. A conversion in accordance with the process of a denomination is not a guarantee of recognition by another denomination. A formal conversion is also sometimes undertaken by individuals whose Jewish ancestry is questioned, even if they were raised Jewish, but may not actually be considered Jews according to traditional Jewish law.

As late as the 6th century, the Eastern Roman empire and Caliph Umar ibn Khattab were issuing decrees against conversion to Judaism, implying that this was still occurring.

=== Spiritism ===
There are no rituals or dogmas, nor any sort of procedures in conversion to Spiritism. The doctrine is first considered as science, then philosophy and lastly as a religion. Allan Kardec's codification of Spiritism occurred between the years 1857 and 1868. Currently there are 25 to 60 million people studying Spiritism in various countries, mainly in Brazil, through its essential books, which include The Spirits Book, The Book on Mediums, The Gospel According to Spiritism, Heaven and Hell and The Genesis According to Spiritism.

Chico Xavier wrote over 490 additional books, which expand on the spiritualist doctrine.

As explained in the first of the 1,019 questions and answers in The Spirits Book:

1. What is God? Answer: "God is the Supreme Intelligence-First Cause of all things."

The consensus in Spiritism is that God, the Great Creator, is above everything, including all human things such as rituals, dogmas, denominations or any other thing.

== Dharmic religions ==
=== Buddhism ===
Persons newly adhering to Buddhism traditionally begin "Taking Three Refuge" (expressing faith in the Three Jewels – Buddha, Dharma, and Sangha) before a monk, nun, or similar representative, often with the sangha, the community of practitioners, also in ritual attendance.

Throughout the timeline of Buddhism, conversions of entire countries and regions to Buddhism were frequent, as Buddhism spread throughout Asia. For example, in the 11th century in Burma, king Anoratha converted his entire country to Theravada Buddhism. At the end of the 12th century, Jayavarman VII set the stage for conversion of the Khmer people to Theravada Buddhism. Mass conversions of areas and communities to Buddhism occur up to the present day, for example, in the Dalit Buddhist movement in India there have been organized mass conversions.

Exceptions to encouraging conversion may occur in some Buddhist movements. In Tibetan Buddhism, for example, the current Dalai Lama discourages active attempts to win converts.

=== Hinduism ===
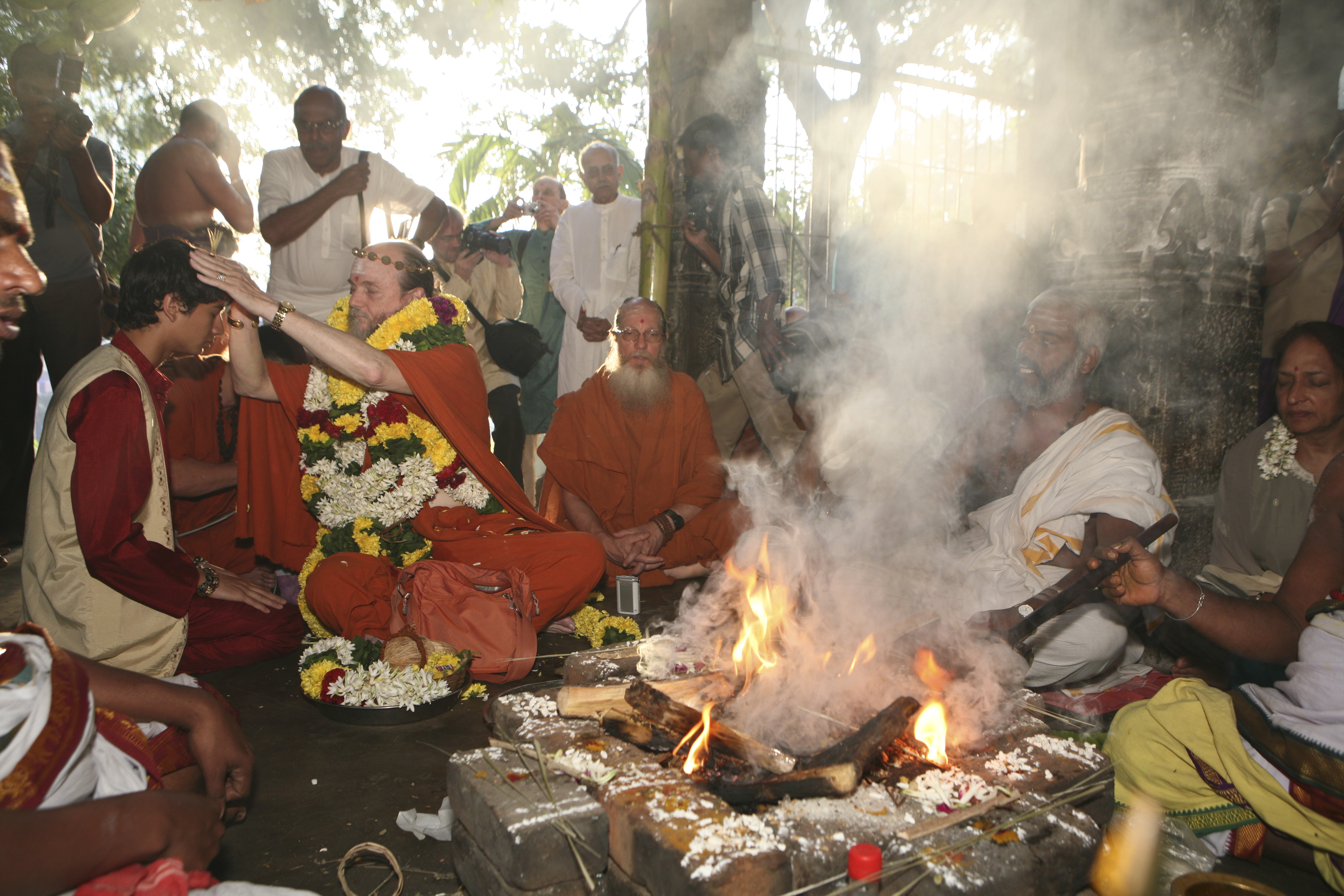
A yajna initiation to Hinduism ceremony in progress

Hinduism is a diverse system of thought with beliefs spanning monotheism, polytheism, panentheism, pantheism, pandeism, monism, and atheism among others. Hinduism has no traditional ecclesiastical order, no centralized religious authorities, no universally accepted governing body, no binding holy book nor any mandatory prayer attendance requirements. In its diffuse and open structure, numerous schools and sects of Hinduism have developed and spun off in India with help from its sannyasi (ascetic or hermetic) scholars, since the Vedic age. The six Astika and two Nastika schools of Hindu philosophy, in its history, did not develop a missionary or proselytization methodology, and they co-existed with each other. Most Hindu sub-schools and sects do not actively seek converts. Individuals have had a choice to enter, leave or change their god(s), spiritual convictions, accept or discard any rituals and practices, and pursue spiritual knowledge and liberation (moksha) in different ways. However, various schools of Hinduism do have some core common beliefs, such as the belief that all living beings have Atman (soul), a belief in karma theory, spirituality, ahimsa (non-violence) as the greatest dharma or virtue, and others.

Religious conversion to Hinduism has a long history outside India. Merchants and traders of India, particularly from the Indian peninsula, carried their religious ideas, which led to religious conversions to Hinduism in Indonesia, Champa, Cambodia and Burma. Some sects of Hindus, particularly of the Bhakti schools began seeking or accepting converts in early to mid 20th century. For example, groups like the International Society for Krishna Consciousness accept those who have a desire to follow their sects of Hinduism and have their own religious conversion procedure.

Since 1800 CE, religious conversion from and to Hinduism has been a controversial subject within Hinduism. Some have suggested that the concept of missionary conversion, either way, is contrary to the precepts of Hinduism. Religious leaders of some of Hinduism sects such as Brahmo Samaj have seen Hinduism as a non-missionary religion yet welcomed new members, while other leaders of Hinduism's diverse schools have stated that with the arrival of missionary Islam and Christianity in India, the view that "there is no such thing as proselytism in Hinduism" must be re-examined.

In recent decades, mainstream Hinduism schools have attempted to systematize ways to accept religious converts, with an increase in inter-religious mixed marriages. The steps involved in becoming a Hindu have variously included a period where the interested person gets an informal ardha-Hindu name and studies ancient literature on spiritual path and practices (English translations of Upanishads, Agama, Itihasa, ethics in Sutra, Hindu festivals, yoga). If after a period of study, the individual still wants to convert, a Namakarana Samskara ceremony is held, where the individual adopts a traditional Hindu name. The initiation ceremony may also include Yajna (i.e., fire ritual with Sanskrit hymns) under guidance of a local Hindu priest. Some of these places are mathas and asramas (hermitage, monastery), where one or more gurus (spiritual guide) conduct the conversion and offer spiritual discussions. Some schools encourage the new convert to learn and participate in community activities such as festivals (Diwali etc.), read and discuss ancient literature, learn and engage in rites of passages (ceremonies of birth, first feeding, first learning day, age of majority, wedding, cremation and others).

=== Jainism ===
Jainism accepts anyone who wants to embrace the religion. There is no specific ritual for becoming a Jain. One does not need to ask any authorities for admission. One becomes a Jain on one's own by observing the five vows (vratas). The five main vows, as mentioned in the ancient Jain texts like Tattvarthasutra, are:

1. Ahimsa - Not to injure any living being by actions and thoughts.
2. Satya - Not to lie or speak words that hurt others.
3. Asteya - Not to take anything if not given.
4. Brahmacharya - Chastity for householders / Celibacy in action, words and thoughts for monks and nuns.
5. Aparigraha (Non-possession) - non-attachment to possessions.

Following the five vows is the main requirement in Jainism. All other aspects such as visiting temples are secondary. Jain monks and nuns are required to observe these five vows strictly.

=== Sikhism ===
Sikhism is not known to openly proselytize conversions, however it is open and accepting to anyone wanting to take on the Sikh faith.

== Other religions and sects ==
In the second half of the 20th century, the rapid growth of new religious movements (NRMs) led some psychologists and other scholars to propose that these groups were using "brainwashing" or "mind control" techniques to gain converts. This theory was publicized by the popular news media but disputed by other scholars, including some sociologists of religion.

In the 1960s sociologist John Lofland lived with Unification Church missionary Young Oon Kim and a small group of American church members in California and studied their activities in trying to promote their beliefs and win converts to their church. Lofland noted that most of their efforts were ineffective and that most of the people who joined did so because of personal relationships – often family relationships – with existing members. Lofland summarised his findings in 1964 in a doctoral thesis entitled "The World Savers: A Field Study of Cult Processes", and in 1966 in book form (published by Prentice-Hall) as Doomsday Cult: A Study of Conversion, Proselytization, and Maintenance of Faith. It is considered to be one of the most important and widely cited studies of the process of religious conversion, and one of the first modern sociological studies of a new religious movement.

The Church of Scientology attempts to gain converts by offering "free stress tests". It has also used the celebrity status of some of its members (most notably that of the American actor Tom Cruise) to attract converts. The Church of Scientology requires that all converts sign a legal waiver which covers their relationship with the Church of Scientology before engaging in Scientology services.

Research in the United States and in the Netherlands has shown a positive correlation between areas lacking mainstream churches and the percentage of people who are members of a new religious movement. This applies also for the presence of New Age centres.

On the other end of the proselytising scale are religions that do not accept any converts. Often these are relatively small, close-knit minority religions that are ethnically based such as the Yazidis, Druze, and Mandaeans. The Parsis, a Zoroastrianism group based in India, classically does not accept converts, but this issue became controversial in the 20th century due to a rapid decline in membership. Chinese traditional religion lacks clear criteria for membership, and hence for conversion. However, Taoism does have its own religious conversion ceremony which seems to be adopted and modified from Chinese Buddhist refuge-taking ceremonies. The Shakers and some Indian eunuch brotherhoods do not allow procreation, so that every member is a convert.

== Fostering conversion ==
Different factors and circumstances may operate and interact to persuade individuals of groups to convert and adopt a new set of religious doctrines and habits.

Religious enthusiasm for proselytism can play a role. For example, the New Testament chronicles the personal activities of the Apostles and their followers in inspired preaching, miracle-working and the subsequent gathering of followers. Freshly-converted Irish and Anglo-Saxon priests spread their new-found faith among pagan British and Germanic peoples. Missions of the 19th century spread against a background of North Atlantic revivalism with its emotionalism and mass-meeting crowd psychological behaviours.

Messianism may prepare groups for the coming of a Messiah or of a saviour. Thus the 1st-century Levant, steeped in expectations of overturning the political situation, provided fertile ground for nascent Christianity and other Jewish messianic sects, such as the Zealots.

Some religious traditions, rather than stressing emotion in the conversion process, emphasise the importance of philosophical thought as a pathway to adopting a new religion. Saint Paul in Athens fits here, as do some of the Indic religions (such as Buddhism and Jainism). The historical God-fearers may represent a philosophical bridge between Hellenism and Abrahamic faith.

A religious creed which can capture the ear and support of secular power can become a prestige movement, encouraging the mass of a people to follow its tenets. Christianity grew after becoming the state religion in Armenia, in the Roman Empire, and in Ethiopia. Eastern Orthodoxy expanded when it gained official sanction in Kievan Rus'.

Some people convert under the influence of other social conditions. Early Christianity attracted followers by offering community material support and enhanced status for disadvantaged groups such as women and slaves. Islam allegedly spread in North Africa through just administration, and in the Balkans by integrating new believers with improved tax conditions and social prestige. Colonial missions since the 19th century have attracted people to an implied nexus of material well-being, civilisation, and European-style religion.

Force can – at least apparently – coerce people into adopting different ideas. Religious police in (for example) Iran and Saudi Arabia answer for the correct religious expression of those in their purview. The Inquisition in France and in Iberia worked to convert heretics – with varying success. Frankish armies spread Roman Catholicism eastwards in the Middle Ages. Religious wars and suppression shaped the histories of the Baltic tribes, the Hussites and the Huguenots.

On the other hand, persecution can drive religious faith and practice underground and strengthen the resolve of oppressed adherents – as in the cases of the Waldenses or the Baháʼí Faith.

== International law ==
The United Nations Universal Declaration of Human Rights defines religious conversion as a human right: "Everyone has the right to freedom of thought, conscience and religion; this right includes freedom to change his religion or belief" (Article 18). Despite this UN-declared human right, some groups forbid or restrict religious conversion (see below).

Based on the declaration the United Nations Commission on Human Rights (UNCHR) drafted the International Covenant on Civil and Political Rights, a legally binding treaty. It states that "Everyone shall have the right to freedom of thought, conscience and religion. This right shall include freedom to have or to adopt a religion or belief of his choice" (Article 18.1). "No one shall be subject to coercion which would impair his freedom to have or to adopt a religion or belief of his choice" (Article 18.2).

The UNCHR issued a General Comment on this Article in 1993: "The Committee observes that the freedom to 'have or to adopt' a religion or belief necessarily entails the freedom to choose a religion or belief, including the right to replace one's current religion or belief with another or to adopt atheistic views ... Article 18.2 bars coercion that would impair the right to have or adopt a religion or belief, including the use of threat of physical force or penal sanctions to compel believers or non-believers to adhere to their religious beliefs and congregations, to recant their religion or belief or to convert." (CCPR/C/21/Rev.1/Add.4, General Comment No. 22.; emphasis added)

Some countries distinguish voluntary, motivated conversion from organized proselytism, attempting to restrict the latter. The boundary between them is not easily defined: what one person considers legitimate evangelizing, or witness-bearing, another may consider intrusive and improper. Illustrating the problems that can arise from such subjective viewpoints is this extract from an article by C. Davis, published in Cleveland State University's Journal of Law and Health: "According to the Union of American Hebrew Congregations, Jews for Jesus and Hebrew Christians constitute two of the most dangerous cults, and its members are appropriate candidates for deprogramming. Anti-cult evangelicals ... protest that 'aggressiveness and proselytizing ... are basic to authentic Christianity,' and that Jews for Jesus and Campus Crusade for Christ are not to be labeled as cults. Furthermore, certain Hassidic groups who physically attacked a meeting of the Hebrew Christian 'cult' have themselves been labeled a 'cult' and equated with the followers of Reverend Moon, by none other than the President of the Central Conference of American Rabbis."

Since the collapse of the former Soviet Union the Russian Orthodox Church has enjoyed a revival. However, it takes exception to what it considers illegitimate proselytizing by the Roman Catholic Church, the Salvation Army, Jehovah's Witnesses, and other religious movements in what it refers to as its canonical territory.

Greece has a long history of conflict, mostly with Jehovah's Witnesses, but also with some Pentecostals, over its laws on proselytism. This situation stems from a law passed in the 1930s by the dictator Ioannis Metaxas. A Jehovah's Witness, Minos Kokkinakis, won the equivalent of $14,400 in damages from the Greek state after being arrested for trying to preach his faith from door to door. In another case, Larissis v. Greece, a member of the Pentecostal church also won a case in the European Court of Human Rights.

== See also ==
- Apostasy, or renunciation of religion
- Conversion to Islam in U.S. prisons
- Forced conversion of minority girls in Pakistan
- Inquisition
- Islamic Missionary Activity
- Kakure Kirishitan
- List of converts to Buddhism
- List of converts to Catholicism
- List of converts to Christianity
- List of converts to Hinduism
- List of converts to Islam
- List of converts to Judaism
- List of converts to Sikhism
- Love Jihad, a conspiracy theory that Muslims feign love to convert others
- Missionary
- Missionary (LDS Church)
- Moral conversion based on the internalist view of morality
- Rite of Christian Initiation of Adults
- Safavid conversion of Iran from Sunnism to Shiism
- The Rage Against God, 2010 book by Peter Hitchens
