= John Lofland (sociologist) =

American sociologist (1946–2026)

- Born: John Franklin Lofland; March 4, 1946; Milford, Delaware, U.S.
- Died: February 4, 2026 (aged 79)

Academic background
- Education: Swarthmore College; Columbia University; University of California, Berkeley
- Thesis: The World-Savers (1964)

Academic work
- Discipline: Sociology
- Sub-discipline: Social movement theory; sociology of deviance; sociology of religion
- Institutions: University of Michigan; California State University; University of California, Davis
- Notable works: Doomsday Cult (1966)

John Franklin Lofland (March 4, 1946 – February 4, 2026) was an American sociologist best known for his studies of the peace movement and for his first book, Doomsday Cult: A Study of Conversion, Proselytization, and Maintenance of Faith, which was based on field work among a group of Unification Church members in California in the 1960s. It is considered to be one of the most important and widely cited studies of the process of religious conversion, and one of the first modern sociological studies of a new religious movement.

== Life and career ==
Lofland was born in Milford, Delaware, and attended Swarthmore College, Columbia University, and the University of California, Berkeley, where he earned a PhD in sociology based on his Unification Church study. Since 1970, he has been a professor in the sociology department at the University of California, Davis, where he was emeritus Professor of Sociology.

In the 1970s, 1980s, and 1990s, Lofland did field work among peace demonstrators in the United States and in Europe. He has undertaken administrative roles in several social science associations and contributed as an editor or associate editor to sociological publications. He has also been active in community organizations in Davis, California.

Lofland's wife Lyn attended Stanford University and Antioch College, then completed a master's degree at the University of Michigan, followed by a doctorate at the University of California, San Francisco. She also taught at UC Davis. Lyn Lofland died on September 7, 2022.

In 1988, Lofland received the Distinguished Scholarship Award from the American Sociological Association's Section on Collective Behavior and Social Movements for his book Protest. In 1995, he was honored with the George Herbert Mead Award by the Society for the Study of Symbolic Interaction for his career contributions to the study of human behavior. To honor the couple's contributions to the department, the University of California, Davis established the John and Lyn Lofland Undergraduate Research Award.

Lofland died on February 4, 2026, at the age of 79.

== Writings ==
- 1966 Doomsday Cult: A Study of Conversion, Missionizing and Faith Maintenance, Prentice-Hall. 1977, Enlarged Edition, hardcover, Irvington; paperback edition, 1981.
- 1969 Deviance and Identity, with the assistance of Lyn Lofland, Prentice-Hall.
- 1971 Analyzing Social Settings: A Guide to Qualitative Observation and Analysis, Wadsworth. 1984, Second Edition, with Lyn H. Lofland. 1995, Third Edition, with Lyn H. Lofland. Japanese translation, 1997. 2006, Fourth Edition, with David A. Snow, Leon Anderson, and Lyn H. Lofland.
- 1976 Doing Social Life: The Qualitative Analysis of Human Interaction in Natural Settings, Wiley.
- 1977 State Executions Viewed Historically and Sociologically, with H. Bleackley, Patterson Smith.
- 1978 Interaction in Everyday Life: Social Strategies, editor, Sage.
- 1982 Crowd Lobbying: An Emerging Tactic of Interest Group Influence in California, Univ. of California, Davis, Institute on Governmental Affairs. Symbolic Sit-ins: Protest Occupations at the California Capitol, with M. Fink, University Press of America.
- 1985 Protest: Studies of Collective Behavior and Social Movements, Transaction. 1991, paperback edition.
- 1990 Peace Action in the Eighties: Social Science Perspectives, co-editor with Sam Marullo, Rutgers.
- 1991 Peace Movement Organizations and Activists: An Analytic Bibliography, co-edited with V.Johnson and P. Kato, Haworth.
- 1993 Polite Protesters: The American Peace Movement of the 1980s, Syracuse.
- 1996 Social Movement Organizations: Guide to Research on Insurgent Realities, Aldine de Gruyter.
- 1999 Old North Davis: Guide to Walking a Traditional Neighborhood. Yolo County Historical Society.
- 2000 Davis, California, 1910s–1940s, (with Phyllis Haig), Arcadia.J. Lofland, C. V. Winter, 2001 — 4
- 2001 Handbook of Ethnography, co-editor with P. Atkinsion, M. Couch, L. Lofland, Sage.
- In process, Demolishing a Historic Hotel: A Documentary Socioiology of Preservation Failures.

== See also ==
- Academic study of new religious movements
- Chicago school (sociology)
- New religious movement
- Unification Church of the United States
- Young Oon Kim
