= Psychophony =

Spirit talking via the voice of a medium

Psychophony (from the Greek psyke, soul and phone, sound, voice) is the name given by Spiritism and some other spiritualist traditions to the phenomenon where, according to them, a spirit talks using the voice of a medium.

Spiritist Doctrine as codified by Allan Kardec identifies two main classes of psychophony, to say, the "conscious" one and the "unconscious" one. The first one, as its name says, happens when the medium assures that he has mentally perceived or physically heard something that a spirit said, having only used his voice to reproduce it. The second one occurs when the medium assures that he ignores what was said, suggesting that a spirit used his phonetic organs while he was unconscious. As happens with all sorts of classification, this one is useful only for didactic purposes. Most psychophony occurrences are neither 100% conscious nor 100% unconscious, lying somewhere between the two classes.

In The Book on Mediums, Allan Kardec calls unconscious psychophonic mediums "speaking mediums".

In 1971, Konstantin Raudive wrote Breakthrough, detailing what he believed was the discovery of electronic voice phenomenon (EVP). EVP, however, has been described as auditory pareidolia.
