= Moral conversion =

Adoption of new moral standards

In philosophy, moral conversion is an existential change in the person, who is perceived as the moral agent adopting new moral standards (or mores) in a process of internal transformation. Moral conversion is a relatively rare event in a person's normal development. It involves a decision that is both conscious and existentialist (i.e. based on critical questioning). Moral conversion is based on the internalist view of morality.

== As an existential event ==
The process of moral conversion was described by Lawrence Kohlberg of the University of Chicago, who developed the so-called Lawrence Kohlberg's stages of moral development. Six classes of moral conversion were identified, based on progressively higher and higher levels of moral reasoning, beginning with the preconventional level of a child, and concluding with the postconventional (or autonomous) level of an adult aware of ethical principles guiding universally moral behaviour.

Notably, the notion of moral conversion has been distinguished from the theory of moral development per se, by Walter E. Conn (of Villanova University) and John C. Gibbs (of the Ohio State University). Moral conversion, according to Conn and Gibbs, involves critical questioning and therefore differs from any spontaneous moral development (Kohlberg). It results in the setting forth of the "self-chosen values" (Conn), which bring the existential dimension to the transforming process.

Alfredo J. Mac Laughlin of St. Ambrose University defines moral conversion by the frequent occurrence of the "sharp-turn conversions" resulting from the presence of free will, which differ from the natural/spontaneous development taking place in incremental stages (Kohlberg). The most significant aspect of moral conversion is the withdrawal from the moral convictions of the past, which is based on "critical self-appropriation" or the critical discovery of oneself. It depends on the sense of authenticity beyond the possibility of predictions.

== As self-transcendence ==
Bernard Lonergan explains that moral conversion is not moral perfection. It is the "withdrawal from self-enclosure" or the shift from personal satisfaction criterion to values that transcend oneself (or one's own group interests). Moral conversion, according to Lonergan, is one of three different types of conversion along with the intellectual and the religious conversion. From a causal point of view, it is the difference between varying levels of consciousness leading to a higher sense of responsibility for the world.

== See also ==
- Redemption
