= Spiritist literature =

Spiritist literature (Portuguese: literatura espírita) is the body of writing associated with Kardecist spiritism, the doctrine systematized by the French educator Hippolyte Léon Denizard Rivail, known as Allan Kardec, beginning with the publication of The Spirits' Book in 1857. The term covers Kardec's own works and the study and outreach texts written by adherents, as well as a large body of books that mediums and publishers attribute to the spirits of deceased people and present as received through psychography: novels, poems, chronicles, short stories, messages and books for children and young people.

Weakened in France after Kardec's death in 1869, Spiritism found its main center of diffusion in Brazil, where its literature reached its widest circulation. The work attributed to the medium Chico Xavier, published from 1932 onward by the Brazilian Spiritist Federation (FEB), became the core of this market. From the 1980s, publishers with no ties to the Spiritist federations multiplied, and mediums such as Zíbia Gasparetto rose to prominence. Books such as Nosso Lar ("Our Home", 1944) have been adapted for film.

Spiritist literature has been studied in anthropology, the history of books and reading, and literary studies. The most discussed topics are the authorship of psychographed works, an issue that reached the Brazilian courts in 1944; the organization of the publishing market; the profile of readers; and the social representations found in the texts, including those of slavery and of Black people.

== Definition and characteristics ==
According to the anthropologist Bernardo Lewgoy, Spiritist literature consists mainly of doctrinal treatises and narratives, and plays a central role in the conversion and socialization of adherents and in the reproduction of their identity. Kardec's works have a status of their own: they are not presented as psychographed, but as his compilation and systematization of communications obtained through various mediums. Five of them, known as the Spiritist basic works, are regarded by Spiritists as the foundation of the doctrine: The Spirits' Book (1857), The Mediums' Book (1861), The Gospel According to Spiritism (1864), Heaven and Hell, or Divine Justice According to Spiritism (1865) and Genesis: The Miracles and the Predictions According to Spiritism (1868).

Scholars describe Spiritism as a literate religion in whose ritual system books, reading and study hold an important place. For Lewgoy, Spiritism is more than a religion with an extensive written output: it is a literate religion anchored in references of nineteenth-century Western modernity, such as Enlightenment rationalism, scientism and the novel. The anthropologist David J. Hess has noted that, unlike Anglo-American Spiritualists, Brazilian Spiritists developed an institutionalized intellectual elite, which reinterpreted parapsychology and produced its own alternative medicine and sociology of religion. In Spiritist centers, the reading of Kardec's works is usually supplemented by recommended literary books, which study groups often cite as truthful accounts of life after death.

The term usually refers to a niche literature aimed at readers interested in Spiritism. The film scholar Laura Cánepa distinguishes this output from works of general literature that show the influence of spiritualist ideas without belonging to it, such as the novel Encarnação (1878) by José de Alencar and The Land of Mist (1926) by Arthur Conan Doyle. The boundaries of the genre are also contested within the religious field: some novels catalogued as Spiritist are written by authors linked to Umbanda, and some authors propose bringing entities typical of that religion, such as pretos-velhos and caboclos, into the work of Spiritist centers.

In psychographed books, authorship is usually presented on two levels: the medium, who signs as responsible for the writing, and the spirit to whom the text is attributed. A survey of readers found that many credit the work to the medium rather than to the spirit. In the arrangement upheld by Chico Xavier and his publishers, the medium is the empirical author but not the intellectual author of the texts. In a historical study, Deise Saraiva and Emanuela Ribeiro attribute authorship to the people who claim to psychograph, on the grounds that only living individuals can write and publish books.

== History ==
=== Kardec and the Revue Spirite (1857–1869) ===
The Spirits' Book was published in Paris on 18 April 1857. In January 1858, Kardec launched the Revue Spirite: Journal d'Études Psychologiques, a monthly periodical he edited until April 1869. It served as a forum for debate and a testing ground for ideas, and many of its articles were later incorporated into the basic books of the doctrine. The second edition of The Spirits' Book (1860), entirely recast, grew from just over 500 to 1,019 questions and answers and included several texts first published in the journal.

Spiritism emerged within the positivist current and the evolutionist optimism of nineteenth-century France, and from the outset faced opposition from the Catholic Church, which classified it as a new sect. The historian Lynn L. Sharp has interpreted Kardec's Spiritism as a "secular spirituality" rooted in progressive French traditions, which spread among urban popular groups as traditional Catholicism declined. The Revue Spirite also recorded internal disputes, such as the one caused by Les Quatre Évangiles (1866) by Jean-Baptiste Roustaing, whose thesis that Jesus had a fluidic body Kardec considered incompatible with Spiritist principles. Roustaing's ideas found acceptance among Brazilian groups; his works were published by the FEB, although many Spiritists regard them as contrary to the doctrine.

After Kardec's death, the French movement quickly fell apart. Marion Aubrée and François Laplantine, cited by Sandra Stoll, attribute this to accusations of fraud, new scientific discoveries, dissension in spiritualist circles and the deaths of the movement's main leaders in the 1920s and 1930s.

=== Arrival in Brazil and early mediumistic works ===
Kardec's texts began circulating in Brazil in the 1860s, initially among literate segments of the urban middle classes in cities such as Salvador and Rio de Janeiro. The Brazilian Spiritist Federation, founded in Rio de Janeiro in 1884, gradually became the institution that defined the discursive and politico-religious contours of Brazilian Spiritism. Until the late 1930s the FEB had no publishing house of its own: it commissioned printing from firms such as Garnier and Laemmert or from printers in Portugal and Paris, and distributed works by foreign and Brazilian authors nationwide through its bookshop. Reformador, a magazine founded in 1883, became the federation's official organ.

Even before Chico Xavier, mediumistic works attributed to dead writers circulated in Brazil. The Portuguese medium Fernando de Lacerda published the four volumes of Do País da Luz ("From the Land of Light"); Zilda Gama published novels attributed to Victor Hugo; and América Delgado, a medium from Pará described in the preface as illiterate, published Os Funerais da Santa Sé ("The Funeral of the Holy See"), attributed to Guerra Junqueiro. In 1935 the columnist Eloy Pontes of O Globo interpreted this output as a form of literary pastiche.

=== Chico Xavier and the Humberto de Campos case ===
Francisco Cândido Xavier, born in 1910 in the interior of Minas Gerais, said that in 1931 he had met his spirit guide, Emmanuel. In 1932 the FEB published his first book, Parnaso de Além-Túmulo ("Parnassus from Beyond the Grave"), with poems attributed to the spirits of deceased poets from Brazil and Portugal. A selection of the poems was published in English in 2013 as Poetry from Beyond the Grave. The chronicler Humberto de Campos, then one of the most widely read in the country, commented on the book in two columns published in the Diário Carioca on 10 and 12 July 1932: he noted that characteristic traits of each poet reappeared in the verses and ironically lamented that poets kept writing after death.

Humberto de Campos died in December 1934. In March 1935, Chico Xavier began attributing texts to him, published first in Reformador and later in books such as Crônicas de Além-Túmulo ("Chronicles from Beyond the Grave", 1937) and Brasil, Coração do Mundo, Pátria do Evangelho ("Brazil, Heart of the World, Homeland of the Gospel", 1938). Between 1937 and 1969, twelve books attributed to him or to the pseudonym Irmão X ("Brother X") were published.

Reception among intellectuals was divided. Eloy Pontes and Eduardo Frieiro saw the texts as pastiches; Osório Borba pointed out flaws in the mediumistic poems in the article "Os defuntos escrevem mal" ("The dead write badly", 1944); and Raimundo Magalhães Júnior argued that imitating so many authors would require a culture and talent unusual for someone with only a primary education. The critic Agrippino Grieco, who had known the writer, said in 1939 that a psychographed letter had given him the impression of reading an unpublished text by Humberto de Campos, though he could not explain it. The psychiatrist J. Melo Teixeira rejected the pastiche hypothesis, while the appellate judge Mário Matos attributed the texts to the devil. For Alexandre Caroli Rocha, these readings show that verdicts on authorship depended on each reader's convictions about communication with the dead.

In 1944 the writer's widow, Catarina Vergolino de Campos, filed a declaratory action against the FEB and Chico Xavier, asking the court to establish whether the works were in fact by the spirit of Humberto de Campos and, if authorship were recognized, claiming the copyright of the books. The writer's mother, Ana de Campos Veras, publicly stated that she recognized her son's style in the books. On 23 August 1944, Judge João Frederico Mourão Russell of the 8th Civil Court of the former Federal District ruled that the plaintiff lacked a cause of action (carência de ação), and the Court of Appeal upheld the decision. The ruling established that, for legal purposes, copyright cannot be attributed to a spirit; the question of authorship itself was not examined on its merits. Miguel Timponi, the lawyer who defended the FEB, recounted the case in the book A Psicografia ante os Tribunais ("Psychography before the Courts"). From Lázaro Redivivo ("Lazarus Revived", 1945) onward, the texts were signed "Irmão X", presented by Chico Xavier as Humberto de Campos's spirit pseudonym.

In 1949 the so-called Pacto Áureo ("Golden Pact") sought to reconcile Spiritist groups divided between strict followers of Kardec and sympathizers of Roustaing. According to the historians Deise Saraiva and Emanuela Ribeiro, the agreement redirected Brazilian Spiritism toward Chico Xavier's psychographed work, and Brasil, Coração do Mundo, Pátria do Evangelho came to function as the movement's founding myth in the country, presenting Brazil as a nation destined to spread the Spiritist message.

=== Publishing expansion of the FEB (1940s–1960s) ===
In May 1944, Raimundo Magalhães Júnior observed in the newspaper A Noite that Spiritist books had a large readership and went through successive editions, and that the poems psychographed by Chico Xavier found as many readers as Espumas Flutuantes by Castro Alves, or perhaps more. The FEB catalogue, organized since the 1930s into collections such as "Filosofia espiritualista e ciências psíquicas" (Spiritualist philosophy and psychic sciences), "Coleção romântica" (Romantic collection), "Biblioteca espírita infantil" (Spiritist children's library) and "Esperanto", gave increasing prominence to Chico Xavier's works, which were also grouped into series.

The main series, A Vida no Mundo Espiritual ("Life in the Spirit World"), comprises thirteen books attributed to the spirit André Luiz, published between Nosso Lar (1944) and E a Vida Continua... ("And Life Goes On...", 1968). By the end of 1969 the series had reached 57 editions and about 546,000 copies, with print runs of 5,000 to 20,000 copies and an average of about 10,000; by comparison, the Brasiliana collection of Companhia Editora Nacional had an average print run of 1,500. Nosso Lar became the FEB's best-selling book after Kardec's works and, by 1968, had been translated into Spanish, English, Japanese and Esperanto. It has since gone through more than sixty Brazilian editions and sold nearly two million copies.

In 1968 the FEB stated in Reformador that it had published some ten million copies of Spiritist books, including about 2.3 million copies of Kardec's works and 1.9 million of Chico Xavier's; the note, however, did not say when the count began. For Ana Lorym Soares, the volume is significant because Spiritist publications never received state subsidies, because the doctrine's legal existence was questioned more than once in the first half of the twentieth century, and because the declared number of adherents barely exceeded half a million. Spiritist practice had been criminalized in 1890. According to a former employee interviewed by Soares, the federation only began employing professional editors in the 1970s.

Chico Xavier published more than 450 books and, through a notarized declaration, donated his royalties to the FEB, to other publishers and to charitable institutions. At least 25 million copies of his books have been sold.

=== Diversification of the market (from 1980) ===
According to Lewgoy, until the 1970s the production of Spiritist books was largely controlled by the federations. From the 1980s onward, publishers with a Spiritist identity but no institutional ties to centers or federations multiplied, such as Petit in São Paulo, and the language of psychographed novels became lighter and more colloquial; many readers came to know Spiritism through these novels rather than through the works of Kardec or Chico Xavier. Petit reported selling one million copies in ten years of Violetas na Janela ("Violets at the Window"), attributed to the spirit Patrícia and psychographed by Vera Lúcia Marinzeck de Carvalho.

Zíbia Gasparetto, who ran her own publishing house and frequently appeared on bestseller lists, broke with the institutional Spiritist movement by defying the norm that a medium should not profit from what they psychograph. For Lewgoy, her work inaugurated a "neo-Spiritist" tendency, with a positive view of the market and of profit and increasingly close to the New Age and self-help movements. From the mid-1980s, the books of Zíbia and her son, Luiz Antonio Gasparetto, were published by a commercial publishing house owned by the family. Excluding Kardec's works, sales in the segment in the early 2000s were led by novels psychographed by Chico Xavier and Divaldo Franco and, more recently, by Zíbia Gasparetto and Vera Lúcia Marinzeck de Carvalho.

In 2000 the magazine Veja estimated the segment at 170 publishers, 250 new titles a year and about six million copies sold annually. In 2003 a report in the magazine Época treated Spiritist literature as a new publishing phenomenon and noted the interest of large secular publishers such as Siciliano, which released its first Spiritist book that year.

In the 1990s publishers invested in more elaborate graphic design, specialized distributors and online bookstores, abandoning the model of cheap, plainly presented books that had prevailed at the federations' publishing houses. More aggressive marketing caused discomfort in a milieu accustomed to associating the Spiritist book with charity and selflessness. Press estimates indicated sales of seven million copies in 2002 and annual revenue of around R$500 million in 2012. FEB publications retain greater legitimacy among Spiritists, but the federation's dominance has been weakened by the rise of new publishers. A later estimate put the number of Spiritist publishing houses in Brazil at more than 200, with over 10,000 titles in circulation.

== Genres and themes ==
The novel is the most sought-after literary genre. Two series psychographed by Chico Xavier stand out among readers: the André Luiz series, which narrates the experiences attributed to that spirit in the spirit world, and the novels of Emmanuel, five historical novels, four of them set in the first centuries of Christianity, such as Há Dois Mil Anos ("Two Thousand Years Ago") and Paulo e Estêvão ("Paul and Stephen"), and one in the seventeenth century. So-called historical Spiritist novels set their plots in a wide range of periods, from ancient Egypt to the Second World War, and present themselves as memories of past lives.

According to Lewgoy, the Spiritist novel became popular from the 1930s by combining the doctrinal message with themes of non-religious fiction, such as love, hatred, seduction and revenge, in colloquial language, and became a gateway for many adherents. The narratives are usually structured as a succession of expiations and choices that lead to the punishment of the characters and then to learning. The doctrine appears explicitly in the ending, and for its readers the genre serves as a synthesis of aspirations to self-cultivation and moral edification.

Spiritist literature also includes mediumistic poetry, such as that collected in Parnaso de Além-Túmulo; chronicles and short stories, as in the books attributed to Humberto de Campos and Irmão X or in Bate-Papo com o Além ("Chatting with the Beyond", 1982) by Zíbia Gasparetto, whose chronicles the medium presents as written in partnership with the spirit of Silveira Sampaio; children's and young adult books, which the FEB published in a dedicated collection from the 1930s; and biographies of mediums. Another genre is the letter attributed to a deceased person and addressed to the family: Chico Xavier recorded more than ten thousand such letters, for which he charged nothing, and they have been the subject of empirical research published in English. Sandra Stoll showed that the biographical narratives about Chico Xavier, built from stories he told and recorded in books by others, follow the model of Catholic hagiography, structured as a story of election marked by suffering, humility and renunciation.

Recurring themes include communication between the living and the dead, reincarnation governed by laws of moral and intellectual progress, the plurality of inhabited worlds and the continuous evolution of the spirit. Over the twentieth century, the depiction of a hierarchically organized spirit world, with institutions similar to earthly ones such as hospitals and schools, also spread. In Nosso Lar, for example, the narrator, André Luiz, describes his arrival at a "spiritual colony" after passing through the Umbral, a region that Spiritist belief presents as a zone of suffering comparable to purgatory.

== Readership ==
Data from the mid-1990s showed the Spiritist public to be the most educated among Brazil's major religions, with more than half having between secondary and higher education. Women from the urban middle classes predominate among readers, many of them of nominally Catholic background. Spiritist books also circulate among non-Spiritists and are sold in specialized and general bookstores, newsstands and Spiritist centers. In the early 2000s, according to a survey by a large online bookstore cited by Stoll, Spiritist readers accounted for more than half of the site's orders of religious books.

In 2019 Ana Claudia da Silva and Verônica Bemvenuto de Abreu e Silva of the University of Brasília published the results of a questionnaire answered by 15,619 people recruited through a messaging app, a non-probability sample of whom 92.7% were Spiritists. Most respondents were women (64.7%); the most frequent age groups were 51–60 and 41–50, and about 81% were attending or had completed higher education. Of the respondents, 90.9% bought their own books, and the main stated reason for reading was study of the doctrine.

In the year before the survey, Kardec's basic works and doctrinal studies were read more than novels, but among literary genres the novel outranked all the others combined. Chico Xavier, Emmanuel and Divaldo Franco were the most cited authors, and Paulo e Estêvão and Nosso Lar were among the most memorable works after the basic works. The authors noted the low presence of women among the authors mentioned: only Zíbia Gasparetto, the spirit Joanna de Ângelis and the medium Yvonne Pereira were named.

== Reception and controversies ==
=== Authorship and literary status ===
Psychographed literature long received little academic attention; in 2016, Denise Prata still noted the scarcity of studies on the subject and defended its legitimacy as an object of research. Saraiva and Ribeiro observe that the use of these novels as historical sources remains uncommon, partly because of prejudices about their literary value, truthfulness and authorship. Lewgoy analyzed the textual strategies of verisimilitude and of the construction of authorship in Spiritist texts. Rocha argues that textual factors alone are not enough to authenticate or refute claims of spirit authorship: categorical verdicts depend on prior acceptance of some theory about life after death or about mediumship.

=== Commercialization ===
The relationship between the Spiritist book and profit is a recurring source of tension. The norm that a medium should not profit from what they psychograph, exemplified by Chico Xavier's donation of his royalties, was challenged by the career of Zíbia Gasparetto, who distanced herself from the institutional movement. The professionalization of the sector in the 1990s also caused unease among readers and publishers used to seeing the Spiritist book as a work of charity.

=== Race and slavery ===
Kardec's writings on race have been criticized. In an 1862 article in the Revue Spirite on "spiritualist and Spiritist phrenology", he maintained that the Black race harbored inferior spirits, a position that, according to Saraiva and Ribeiro, still causes discomfort among the more orthodox Spiritists. Silva and Silva describe the text as an expression of the racism of nineteenth-century slaveholding society, written in dialogue with phrenology, a theory later discredited, and note that the claim is not reproduced in the doctrine's systematic study program.

Saraiva and Ribeiro identified a marked increase, from the 1990s onward, in Spiritist novels dealing with slavery and Black characters, and linked the trend to the national debate on racism and affirmative action. The earliest they found, Senzala ("Slave Quarters", 1976) by Salvador Gentile, contrasts a cruel slaveholder with a benevolent one without questioning slavery itself, portrays enslaved people as passive, and treats captivity as sacrifice and spiritual "redemption" (resgate). The authors also argue that Brasil, Coração do Mundo, Pátria do Evangelho offers an interpretation of slavery that suggests racial inferiority and associates being born with Black skin with a guilt to be redeemed through suffering, a reading that became controversial among Spiritists especially from the 1990s.

== Adaptations ==
Works of Spiritist literature have been adapted for film. Joelma 23º Andar (1980), directed by Clery Cunha, was based on Somos Seis ("We Are Six"), a book psychographed by Chico Xavier containing accounts attributed to young people who died in the Joelma Building fire in São Paulo, and officially drew nearly one million viewers. From 2008 a series of Spiritist-themed feature films appeared: Bezerra de Menezes: O Diário de um Espírito (2008), with more than 500,000 viewers; Chico Xavier (2010), directed by Daniel Filho, with 3.4 million; and Nosso Lar (2010), directed by Wagner de Assis and adapted from André Luiz's book, with more than four million. According to its distributor, Nosso Lar was the most expensive Brazilian production up to that time and the fastest local-language film in Brazil to reach one million admissions; it grossed about US$25 million in Brazil and was later acquired for release in the United States as Astral City: A Spiritual Journey. Other titles followed: As Mães de Chico Xavier (2011), O Filme dos Espíritos (2011), inspired by The Spirits' Book, and E a Vida Continua (2012), adapted from another book in the André Luiz series.

For Laura Cánepa, the main films of this wave resemble hagiographic narratives and retain links with fantasy cinema. She also notes the strength of Spiritist theater: the lead actor of Nosso Lar, Renato Prieto, headlined more than a dozen Spiritist stage productions seen by more than five million spectators.
