= Concerned Christians =

Christian terrorist group

The Concerned Christians are a New Religious Movement founded in the mid 1980s by Monte Kim Miller. Miller initially formed the group as an anti-cult organization aimed at combatting New Age religious movements and anti-Christian sentiment. In the mid 1990's, Miller claimed he was receiving direct revelations from God, and the group's focus shifted towards extreme, apocalyptic messaging. The group has been described as both a terrorist group and a cult.

== Foundation, Beliefs, and Values ==
The Concerned Christians were founded by Monte Kim Miller in the 1980s as a way to combat anti-Christian sentiment and New Age religiosity. Miller had previously worked as a marketing executive at Proctor and Gamble, and he also produced a radio program that broadcast the group's ideas. Miller claimed to have converted to Christianity in 1983. In 1996, Miller began to claim that God was speaking "through his mouth" in an interview with a local TV news station. In 2001, Miller opened a website for the group, which remains online as of September 2026. In 2002, Miller would claim that the end of the world had begun once more, and a holocaust would begin in the United States. The Concerned Christians believe that Miller is the "Lord's prophet of the last days", sent to save the souls of humanity before the apocalypse. Miller's beliefs are explained in 2900 'unsealings' and hundreds of 'prophecy tapes' on the groups website, which also includes 210 excerpts from the group's radio program, all of which have been written, recorded, and compiled by Miller. Some of the beliefs held by the group include the belief that the collapse of the Soviet Union in 1991 signaled "the time of the end", that the office of the U.S. President is the seat of the Antichrist, and the belief that the prophet Daniel predicted much of world history. Documents marked as 'unsealings' created after the 2008 United States Presidential Election exist on the site, although it is unknown if Miller was the direct author of these. In 2001, the group was estimated to have at least 60 remaining members in Greece and the Philadelphia area.

A 1999 article published by The Guardian described it as originally an anti-cult group which worked alongside the police and established churches "to preach against the dangers of mind control by extreme religious groups".

== Arrest and deportation by Israeli authorities ==
After Miller predicted a city-ending earthquake in October 1998, which did not occur, members of the cult began leaving Colorado and moving to Jerusalem. Later on, a section of Miller's website called "Mouth To Ears" would display a message stating that he did not make such a claim, and reiterating his claim to prophecy.

Between 60 and 80 members of the group disappeared from their homes and jobs in Colorado in October 1998 and were the subject of a search. On January 3, 1999, they gained notoriety when they were arrested and deported from Israel as part of an Israeli effort to protect the Al-Aqsa mosque from extremist Christian groups, codenamed "Operation Walk on Water". According to Israeli police, the Concerned Christians were one of several independent groups who believed it must be destroyed to facilitate the return of Jesus Christ. The group members said that they were law-abiding religious pilgrims there to await the return of Jesus but had no plans to participate in any illegal activity.
