= The Book on Mediums =

1861 book by Allan Kardec

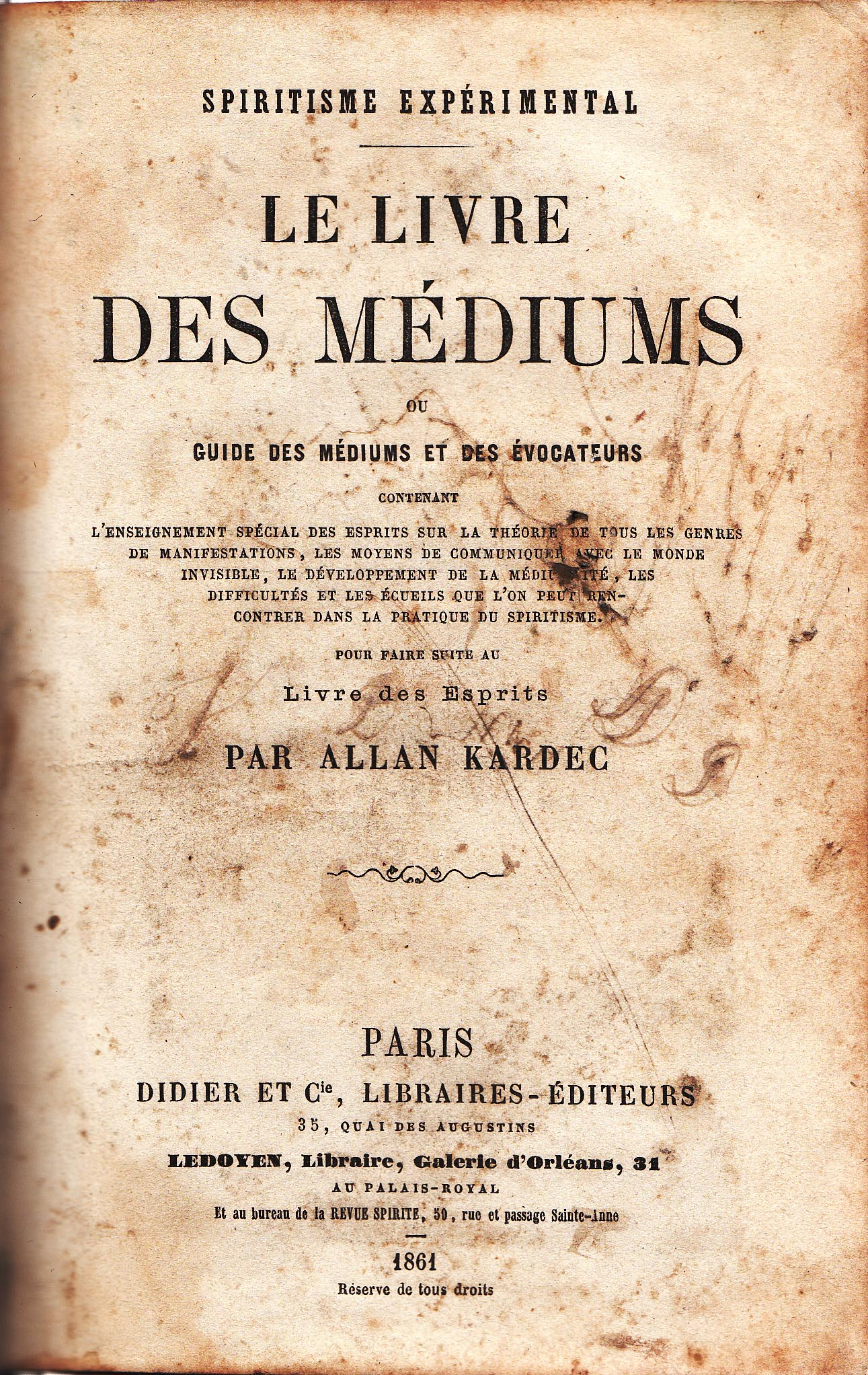
- Author: Allan Kardec
- Original title: Le Livre des Médiums
- Series: Fundamental Works of Spiritism
- Release number: 2
- Publication date: 1861

The Book on Mediums or Mediums and Evokers' Handbook (a.k.a. The Mediums' Book —Le Livre des Médiums, in French), is a book by Allan Kardec published in 1861, second of the five Fundamental Works of Spiritism — the philosophy Kardec had been publishing — being the tome in which the experimental and investigative features of the doctrine were presented, explained and taught.

== Scope ==
It is intended to be an actual handbook for would-be mediums, containing doctrine and practices that one must master in order to become a medium, an elementary course on theories and basic methods to assess the new light that had never been tried by rational inquiry before: the interaction of the physical and spiritual worlds.

The Book on Mediums set the bases and the terminology that guided Parapsychology and Paranormality for quite sometime. In its pages one will find a classification of paranormal phenomena, with a special focus on those capable of communicating messages, and thorough descriptions of the mechanisms that — according to Spiritism — were involved. It also contains serious warnings against unguided use of the gift of mediumship, especially without the necessary seriousness.

== Contents ==
The book's signature is its focus on theory instead of practice: not a single line of ritual is given (Spiritists believe all rituals are superfluous), unless one consider recommendations for prayer (without giving formulae) as "ritual". In its first part, there is an overall introduction to the fundamental points of Spiritism. The following topics are examined within the book:

=== First Part (Preliminary Topics) ===
This part appears to contain a defense of Spiritism on empiric and logical grounds.

- Are there spirits?
- The difference between the extraordinary and the supernatural (with the apt conclusion that most things seen as supernatural are only extraordinary but natural phenomena).
- How to reason against those who, for several types of reasons, will not believe Spiritism.
- Exposition of the fallacies of most explanations of Spiritism.
- Cautionary exposition of some views of Spiritism that bordered on fanaticism, Obscurantism, polytheism or charlatanism.

This last aspect shows that ever since the beginnings of Spiritism there were "deviant" groups with a different interpretation, some of which tried to identify themselves with the term Spiritism, which Kardec claimed to be an original term created by him to avoid such confusion.

=== Second Part (Manifestations of Spirits) ===
This part first describes and categorises the kinds of phenomena that are related to spirits, like:

- Production or modification of matter
- Table-turning
- Incorporation of spirits
- Haunted houses
- Transfiguration
- Apparition
- Psychography
- Psychophony
- Telekinesis, which Kardec knew as Poltergeist

Then it goes into explaining how to deal with the intelligent manifestations ("communications"). It is noteworthy that very little is "taught" on how to produce the spiritist phenomena, as in Kardec's view these were natural and spontaneous. Kardec regards as more important the correct understanding and the tight control of conditions during and after the phenomenon took place. He thought it was wiser that the would-be medium knew what to expect and how to behave before he was given any instructions on how to engage on evocation. There were, apparently, some cases of mania or personality disorder related to prolonged infatuation with Spiritism, which he was careful to advise how to avoid.

Among the main advice we find:

- Do not believe the spirit to be who he purports to be unless there is evidence supporting his claim, but even then, wait until others confirm what one has said.
- Do not judge the spirits by their purported names, but by the quality of the morals and the philosophy found in their communications.
- Do not let yourself too entertained with the evocation or incorporation of spirits enough to disregard what is more important, like living your own life and helping your neighbour.
- Do not live by the spirits' advice: the communications from the spirits are to be studied and revered — but they should not be taken as the word-by-word expression of the ultimate truth.
- Do not judge the quality of the communication by the culture or the social status of the medium by which it was brought.

In the final chapters Kardec present the rules and the statutes of the Spiritist Society he had helped found in Paris, which he hoped could be useful as models to other societies worldwide.

== Important concepts developed or introduced in this Book ==
The Book on Mediums repeats, develops and extends into detail some broad concepts about Spirits found in The Spirits' Book. It also introduces some new ones.

- Spirits: Spirits are the souls of humans who have left the physical body or have not yet reincarnated; they retain their moral and intellectual traits, so the imperfections of human life are also present in the spiritual realm.
- Perispirit: The Perispirit, a semi-material envelope (or body) which is the link between pure spirit and pure matter. Such envelope is called Perispirit (from Greek, meaning Outer Spirit or Around the Spirit) and is renewed each time a spirit reincarnates. The perispirit has roughly the same appearance of the spirits' last incarnation and is what we actually see in apparitions.
- Serfdom in the Spirit World: Lower spirits, especially those in penance are often hired by higher spirits as their apprentices or even serfs. Weak spirits of low morals may be even enslaved by strong, evil others, especially if they were enemies when incarnated.
- The cause of Poltergeists: The perturbation popularly named poltergeist is caused by an evil or clueless spirit taking advantage of an untrained natural medium. If the medium learns how to control his/her powers he will not be disturbed by it. Sometimes the medium loses his/her powers after puberty.
- Mind over matter: Spirits are capable of moving, transporting, dematerialising and rematerialising inanimate objects, with the help of mediums
- Instrument or Medium?: Throughout the book Kardec used both terms interchangeably, but he prefers to use instrument instead of medium when talking to spirits.
- Sleep is the emancipation of the mind: While we are asleep our spirit loosens its ties to matter and wanders the spiritual world. Because of it, it is theoretically possible—although uncommon—to see the spirit of a living person as an apparition.
- Sometimes it is just an illusion: Kardec admits that often people who report apparitions or poltergeist are victims of delusion, hallucination or are just lying.
- The spiritual world is a mirror of the material world, except for the lower spirits (for whom it is something not unlike hell) or the higher ones (for whom it is ideal, immaterial).
- Haunted houses are haunted all the time, not only at night: But it is much easier to hear and to see spirits when it is quiet and dark.
- Because spirits are of varied degrees of knowledge and morality, their communications are also diverse, ranging from inane, stupid, common-place, common sense, elevated but lacking originality to name a few. Only a small portion of the communications are worth keeping record of. Technically, nothing prevents a spirit from producing communications of pornographic nature, if he/she is so inclined. The only way to select the quality of communication is by sympathy: spirits are drawn by similar tastes, so each medium will attract spirits that share his interests or know his weaknesses.
- There are different types of mediums, as many as the different types of phenomena spirits can produce. A few mediums can produce more than one type of phenomenon, in that those who see/hear cannot produce physical effects, those who write cannot see, and so on. The most common types are: physical effects, seer, hearer, psychographer, sensitive, incorporative (talkative), sleepwalking, healer and intuitive.
- Mediumship can be tiring, painful or even downright dangerous to the health of the body or of the mind.
- Most mediums are under the risk of being overwhelmed by evil spirits and made their puppets. The only way to prevent this is to lead a moderate and ethical life.
- No medium can produce phenomena at will, but only when some spirit is willing to.
- Animals are mediums too: they can see spirits, hear them or even be haunted by them.
- A large amount of the evil that exists in the world is the work of lower evil spirits that obsess the minds of the weak of will.

== See also ==
- Spiritism
- Spiritism
- Spiritist Codification
- The Spirits Book
