= Spiritist basic works =

Religious canon of Spiritism

Denominated basic works of Spiritism (Portuguese: Obras básicas do Espiritismo), also referred to as Codificação Espírita, are five books published by the French educator Hippolyte Léon Denizard Rivail under the pseudonym Allan Kardec, between 1857 and 1868. The Basic Works are part of the Fundamental Works of Spiritist Doctrine, which comprise 11 publications by Allan Kardec.

== Overview ==
The Basic Works consist of five books, starting with The Spirits' Book, the most comprehensive one, composed of a lengthy introduction presenting Spiritism and 1019 questions addressed to the spirits, whose answers were codified (analyzed, summarized, and organized) by Allan Kardec. They address, from the spirits' point of view, topics related to the interaction with the spirit world (The Mediums' Book), Christian morality (The Gospel According to Spiritism), philosophy and justice (Heaven and Hell), and finally, science-related subjects (The Genesis).

- 1857 - The Spirits' Book - presents the principles of the Spiritist Doctrine;
- 1861 - The Mediums' Book - discusses the experimental and investigative aspects of Spiritism, seen as a theoretical and methodological tool to understand a "new order of phenomena" that had not been considered by scientific knowledge: the so-called spiritist phenomena or mediumship, believed to be caused by the intervention of spirits in the physical reality;
- 1864 - The Gospel According to Spiritism - essentially a moral work, in which Kardec selects the canonical Gospels of the Bible as a starting point for inferring moral principles common to all "great religious systems" and aims to demonstrate their harmony with Spiritism;
- 1865 - Heaven and Hell - composed of two parts: the first part critically examines the Catholic doctrine on transcendence, aiming to highlight philosophical contradictions and inconsistencies with scientific knowledge that, according to Kardec, could be overcome through the spiritist paradigm of reasoned faith. The second part contains dozens of dialogues that are said to have taken place between Kardec and various spirits, in which they recount their impressions of the transcendental existence;
- 1868 - The Genesis According to Spiritism - composed of three parts. The first part addresses the Genesis, that is, the formation of worlds and the creation of living and non-living beings. The second part deals with miracles, discussing what can be considered a miracle and explaining, from the perspective of Spiritist Doctrine, the many miracles performed by Jesus. The third part explains how and why predictions of future events, premonitions, and related phenomena can occur.

In addition to these basic works, Kardec wrote a series of booklets with the aim of popularizing the doctrine and making its dissemination easier and faster. These booklets were made available at affordable prices to all those interested. Some of them went through several editions and continued to be reprinted even after the Codifier's passing:

- 1858 - Practical Instructions on Spiritist Manifestations - initially published in limited quantities, instead of reprinting it, Kardec decided to incorporate its contents into new editions of The Spirits' Book and later into The Mediums' Book.

We had published a 'Practical Instruction' with the aim of guiding mediums. This work is now sold out, and although we created it with serious and important goals, we will not reprint it because we still do not consider it complete enough to clarify all the difficulties that may be encountered. We have replaced it with this book, in which we have gathered all the data that long experience and conscientious study have allowed us to gather.

— KARDEC, Allan. The Mediums' Book, Introduction.

- 1862 - Spiritism in Its Simplest Expression - according to Kardec himself in the January 1862 issue of the Revue Spirite, "the purpose of this publication is to provide a very concise overview of the history of Spiritism and sufficient knowledge of the Doctrine of Spirits to understand its moral and philosophical objectives. Through clarity and simplicity of style, we sought to make it accessible to all intelligences. We rely on the zeal of all true Spiritists to help with its dissemination";
- 1864 - Summary of the Spiritist Phenomena Law - a brochure consisting of numbered items, mostly short paragraphs summarizing the doctrinal principles and practical aspects of spiritist phenomena;
- 1868 - The Character of the Spiritist Revelation - a collection of excerpts taken from the Revue Spirite, later included in Chapter I of The Genesis;
- 1869 (May) - Rational Catalog of Works for Establishing a Spiritist Library - as the name suggests, it provides guidance for those who wish to establish a library for the study of spiritist doctrine. It lists not only the works published by Kardec himself (here referred to as "fundamental" works, with their respective prices and conditions of sale), but also other works that he considered important at the time, categorized as "Various Works on Spiritism (or complementary to the doctrine)" and "Works produced outside of Spiritism".

Finally, the following addition is made to this list:

- 1890 - Posthumous Works - unpublished writings and studies by Kardec, including annotations on the behind-the-scenes of the creation of the doctrine, which aid in its understanding.

In Brazil, other lesser-known works were published:

- The Spiritist Beginner (by O Pensamento publishing house);
- Obsession (by Casa Editora O Clarim).

== Rational Catalog of Works for Establishing a Spiritist Library ==
This small book by Allan Kardec lists the "Fundamental Works of Spiritist Doctrine" codified by himself, summarized as follows:

- The Spirits' Book (philosophical part) containing the principles of Spiritist Doctrine - 1 volume.
- The Mediums' Book (experimental part) - Guide for mediums and evokers, presenting the theory of all kinds of manifestations - 1 volume.
- The Gospel According to Spiritism (moral part) - explaining the moral maxims of Christ, their application, and their agreement with Spiritism - 1 volume.
- Heaven and Hell or The Divine Justice According to Spiritism - containing numerous examples of the situation of spirits in the spiritual world and on Earth - 1 volume.
- The Genesis, Miracles, and Predictions According to Spiritism - 1 volume.
- What Is Spiritism? - Introduction to the knowledge of the spirit world - 1 volume.
- Spiritism in Its Simplest Expression - Brochure.
- Summary of the Spiritist Phenomena Law - Brochure.
- The Character of the Spiritist Revelation - Brochure.
- Spiritist Trip in 1862 - Brochure.
- Spiritist Review - Journal of Psychological Studies. Founded by Allan Kardec. Published between the 1st and 5th of each month since January 1, 1858, on two sheets of minimal format... COLLECTION OF THE SPIRITIST REVIEW FROM 1858 ONWARD. Each year forms a large volume in brochure format.

== See also ==
- Allan Kardec
- Spiritist Doctrine
- Spiritism (term)
- Spirit of Truth (Spiritism)
