= Young Oon Kim =

South Korean theologian (1914–1989)

- Born: 1914
- Died: 1989 (aged 74–75)

Korean name
- Hangul: 김영운
- RR: Gim Yeongun
- MR: Kim Yŏngun

Young Oon Kim (Korean: 김영운; 1914–1989) was a leading theologian of the Unification Church and its first missionary to the United States.

== Career ==
Kim was a professor of religion at Ewha University in Seoul, South Korea. After she joined the Unification Church, church founder Sun Myung Moon sent her to the United States as a missionary in January 1959. In the 1960s, while a missionary in Oregon and California, she worked to promote Unification Church theology to mainstream Christian churches. She was also the first person to translate the Divine Principle, the basic textbook of Unification Church teaching, from Korean to English. From 1975 to 1988 she was a Professor of Systematic Theology at the Unification Theological Seminary in Barrytown, New York, and the first Unification Church member on the faculty there.

== Works ==
- A study of symbols and allegories in the Fourth Gospel, 1951, Victoria University, Toronto
- The Divine Principles, 1963, The Holy Spirit Association for the Unification of World Christianity (Unification Church)
- Divine Principle and its Application, 1980, The Holy Spirit Association for the Unification of World Christianity
- For God's Sake, 1972, The Holy Spirit Association for the Unification of World Christianity
- World Religions: Living religions of the Middle East, 1976, Golden Gate Publishing Company
- World Religions: India's religious quest, 1976, Golden Gate Publishing Company
- World Religions: Faiths of the Far East, 1976, Golden Gate Publishing Company
- Unification theology & Christian thought, 1976, Golden Gate Publishing Company
- Unification Theology, 1980, The Holy Spirit Association for the Unification of World Christianity
- New methods of group Bible study in Korea: with focus on the Korean Methodist Church, 1982, San Francisco Theological Seminary
- The Types of Modern Theology, 1983, The Holy Spirit Association for the Unification of World Christianity
- An introduction to theology, 1983, The Holy Spirit Association for the Unification of World Christianity
- Unification theology in comparative perspectives, 1988, Unification Theological Seminary

== See also ==
- List of Unification Church members
- Unification Church of the United States
